= Kent County, Ontario =

Former County in Ontario, Canada

Kent County
- Dissolved County
- Location of Kent County in Ontario
- Coordinates: 42°22′37″N 82°11′20″W
- Country: Canada
- Province: Ontario
- Settled: 1792
- Dissolved: 1998 - merged to form Chatham-Kent
- County seat: Chatham
- Municipalities: List: *Camden, Ontario; Chatham; Dover; Harwich; Howard; Orford; Raleigh; Romney; Tilbury East
- Time zone: UTC-5 (EST)
  - Summer (DST): UTC-4 (EDT)
- Area codes: 519/226

Kent County, area 2,458 km^{2} (949 sq mi) is a historic county in the Canadian province of Ontario.

The county was created in 1792 and named by John Graves Simcoe in honour of the English County. The county is in an alluvial plain between Lake St. Clair, and Lake Erie, watered by two navigable streams, the Thames River and the Sydenham River.

On January 1, 1998, the county, its townships, towns, and Chatham were amalgamated into the single-tier city of Chatham-Kent.

== Original townships ==
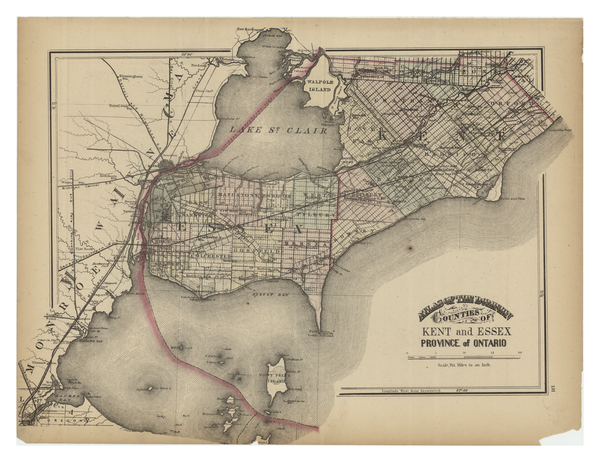
Historical map that includes Kent County (1875)

=== Camden ===
Area: 40,625 acres (164 km^{2}). Camden Township was conceded by treaty in 1790, and the Gore was surrendered by treaty in 1819. Surveyed in 1794 and named from the Earl of Camden. Also referred to earlier as Camden Township and Gore, and in the 1861 census as Camden & Gore Township. Containing some of the best farmland in Ontario, the township was originally parcelled as a grid with Concessions 1 to 7 running north-westward, Lots 1 to 18 running north-eastward and Concession A along the road to Thamesville. The Gore of Camden is a rectangular section of land in the north and northwest area of the township. The Camden Gore contains Concessions 1 to 14 running eastward and Lots 1 to 10 running northward. The Gore was variously administered by Lambton and Kent counties as the population changed and road improvements were made. Community centres: Dresden, Thamesville

=== Chatham ===
Area: 83,964 acres (340 km^{2}) Chatham Township was conceded by treaty in 1790, and the Gore was conceded by treaty in 1796. Surveyed in 1794. Also referred to earlier as Chatham Township and Gore. The township was originally parcelled as a grid with Concessions 1 to 19 running north-westward and Lots 1 to 25 running north-eastward. The Gore of Chatham is a rectangular piece of land in the north-northwest of the township. The Chatham Gore contains four Concessions running northward and 25 Lots running eastward. The Gore was variously administered by Lambton and Kent counties as the population changed and road improvements were made. Community centres: City of Chatham, the town of Wallaceburg

=== Dover ===
Area: 68,617 acres (278 km^{2}). Dover Township was named after Dover, England. It was surveyed in 1794 and incorporated in 1850. Within the boundaries of Dover along the Chenail Ecarté of the river St. Clair is the site of Lord Selkirk's Baldoon Settlement, established in 1803. Community centres: Mitchell's Bay, Grande Pointe, Dover Centre and Pain Court

=== Harwich ===
Area: 88,349 acres (358 km^{2}). Surveyed in 1794 and named from the English port at the mouth of the Thames. A resident of Harwich, Valintine Zimmer, co-founded with friends of the same nationality the German Concession of Harwich. Community centres: Blenheim, Erieau, Erie Beach, Shrewsbury

=== Howard ===
Area: 58,607 acres (237 km^{2}). Surveyed in 1794 and named after Thomas Howard, Earl of Effingham, father-in-law of Sir Guy Carleton. Community centres: Morpeth, Ridgetown

=== Orford ===
Area: 49,677 acres (201 km^{2}). Surveyed in 1794 and named from the English port of Orford, Suffolk. Community centres: Highgate

=== Raleigh ===
Area: 72,100 acres (292 km^{2}). Surveyed in 1794. Likely named for Walter Raleigh. Community centres: Charing Cross

=== Romney ===
Area: 26,193 acres (106 km^{2}), Surveyed in 1794. Named for the Kentish port in England. Community centres: Wheatley

=== Tilbury East ===
Area: 54,116 acres (219 km^{2}). Surveyed in 1794, named for the English Tilbury fort in Essex. Community centres: Merlin, Tilbury

=== Zone ===
Area: 27,154 acres (110 km^{2}). Separated from Orford in 1821 to provide a special organizational district, "the zone", for the Indians of the Moravian Mission on the Thames. Community centres: Bothwell

== Municipalities (as of 1997) ==
- Town of Chatham: County Seat, largest population centre in the county.
- Town of Blenheim: Incorporated in 1885.
- Town of Bothwell: Incorporated in 1867.
- Town of Dresden: Incorporated in 1882.
- Town of Ridgetown: Incorporated in 1875.
- Town of Tilbury: Incorporated as Village of Tilbury Centre in 1887 and Town of Tilbury in 1910.
- Town of Wallaceburg: Incorporated as a village in 1875 and a town in 1896.
- Village of Erie Beach
- Village of Erieau
- Village of Highgate
- Village of Thamesville
- Village of Wheatley
- Township of Camden
- Township of Chatham
- Township of Dover
- Township of Harwich
- Township of Howard
- Township of Orford
- Township of Raleigh
- Township of Romney
- Township of Tilbury East
- Township of Zone

== Former Municipalities ==
- Police Village of Merlin: annexed by Tilbury East before amalgamation into Chatham-Kent.

== Notable residents ==
- W. B. George (1899–1972), president of the Canadian Amateur Hockey Association and agriculturalist at Kemptville Agricultural School, was born in Highgate in Orford Township.

== See also ==
- List of Ontario census divisions
- List of townships in Ontario
- Chatham-Kent, Ontario
