= Charing Cross, Ontario =

Charing Cross
- Unincorporated community
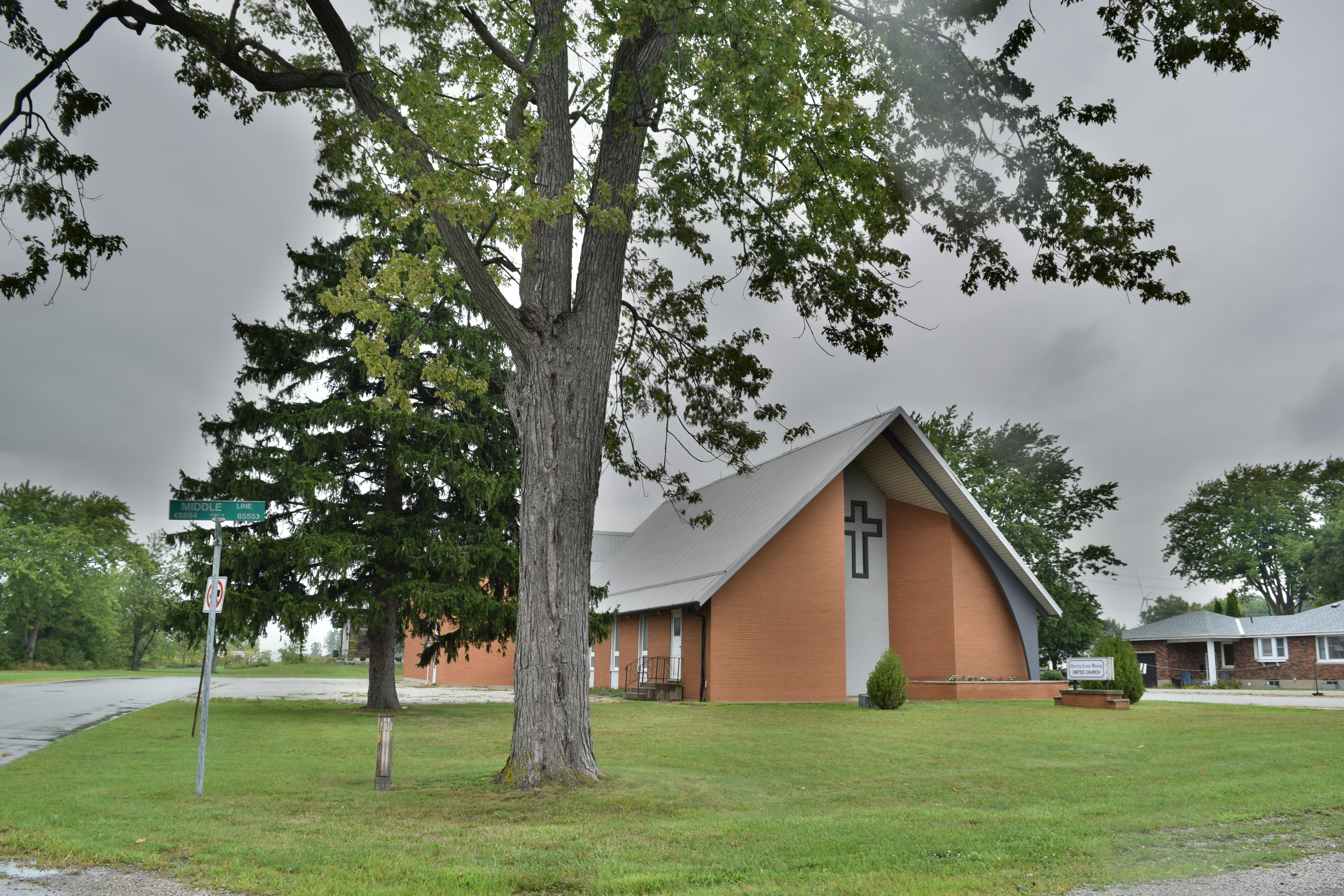
- Charing Cross United Church

- Location of Charing Cross in Chatham-Kent Charing Cross (Southern Ontario)
- Coordinates: 42°19′57″N 82°5′52″W
- Country: Canada
- Province: Ontario
- Municipality: Chatham-Kent
- Time zone: UTC-5 (EST)
  - Summer (DST): UTC-4 (EDT)
- Postal codes: N7L, 1G0
- Area code(s): 519, 226, 548, 382
- GNBC Code: FAPZF

Charing Cross is an unincorporated community in Chatham-Kent, Ontario, Canada. The settlement is located at the intersection of Charing Cross Road (Chatham-Kent Road 10) and Middle Line (Chatham-Kent Road 8).

== Etymology ==
Charing Cross was originally known as Cook's Corners, named after the first settler to establish himself there, an Englishman named Cook. Upon the opening of a station of the Canada Southern Railway in the early 1870s, the community was renamed Charing Cross, likely in reference to Charing Cross in London, England.

== History ==
The early settlement had two hotels, a steam saw mill, telegraph offices, and was located on a branch of the Canada Southern Railway. A post office was established in 1860. In 1869, the population was 100.

Charing Cross was also a stop on the southern branch of the Chatham, Wallaceburg, and Lake Erie Interurban Railway, which began operating in 1908 and ran between Chatham and Erie Beach. The railroad ceased operations in 1930.

== Infrastructure ==
Passenger bus service is provided by CK Transit.

== Notable people ==
- Ron Ritchie – Member of Parliament
