= Erie Beach, Ontario =

Erie Beach is the name of two communities in the Canadian province of Ontario:

- Erie Beach, Chatham-Kent and
- Erie Beach, Fort Erie.
