= Erieau, Ontario =

Erieau
- Unincorporated community
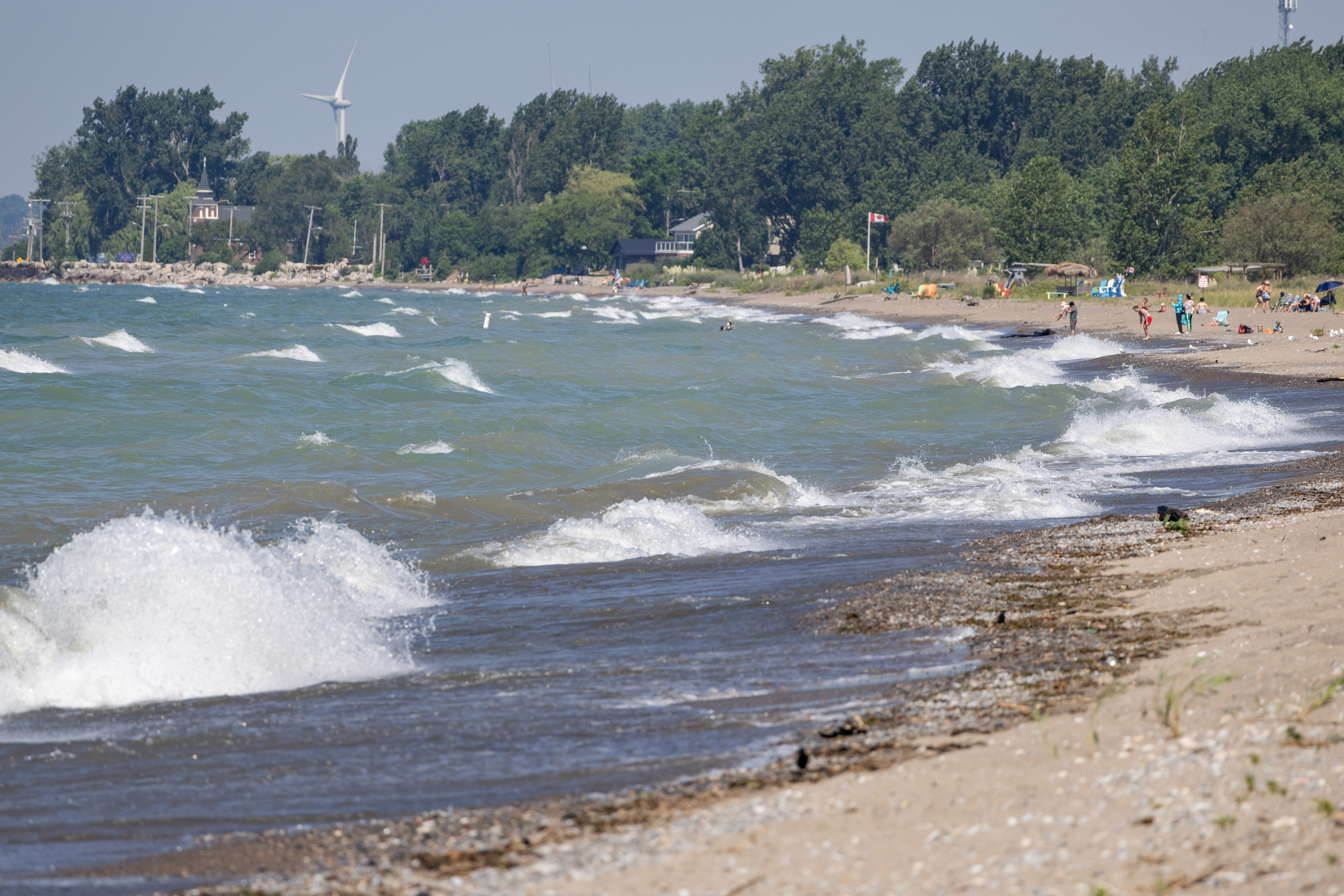
- Erieau Beach

- Location of Erieau in Chatham-Kent Erieau (Southern Ontario)
- Coordinates: 42°15′38.5″N 81°55′01.19″W
- Country: Canada
- Province: Ontario
- Municipality: Chatham-Kent
- Village (Incorp.): 1917
- Amalgamated: 1998

Area
  - Total: 0.69 km^{2} (0.27 sq mi)

Population (2021)
  - Total: 363
  - Density: 528.8/km^{2} (1,370/sq mi)
- Demonym: Erieauan
- Time zone: UTC-5 (EST)
  - Summer (DST): UTC-4 (EDT)
- Postal codes: N7L, 1N0
- Area code(s): 519, 226, 548, 382

Erieau is an unincorporated community in Chatham-Kent, Ontario, Canada. It is recognized as a designated place by Statistics Canada. Since its initial settlement in the late 19th century, Erieau has remained a popular local summer destination.

== Etymology ==
During its early history, Erieau was known by several names, including Rondeau Harbour, Rond Eau, The Eau, and the Piers. The name Erieau came into existence following the establishment of a post office in the community. As a post office named Rondeau already existed, postmaster Malcolm Sherman combined "Lake Erie" and "Rondeau" to form a new name, Erieau.

== History ==
John Graves Simcoe, the first governor of Upper Canada (1791–1796), had originally intended for the settlement of Shrewsbury, located on the north shore of Rondeau Bay, to become a major town and naval port. Although this vision never came to be, various efforts were made to realize the intent. Most significantly, as part of a series of national public works initiated by Lord Sydenham, a channel was dredged through the sand bar at the mouth of Rondeau Bay in 1844, allowing for large sailing ships to access the wharf at Shrewsbury from Lake Erie. As part of this £75,000 harbour program, piers and a lighthouse were also constructed at the mouth of the bay; these would the first structures to be established at Erieau.

Over the next few decades, the human presence at Erieau gradually increased, with Erieau becoming both a site of commercial fishing and an increasingly popular summer resort, popular for picnicking and home to a growing number of summer cottages and related businesses.

In 1894, the Erie and Huron Railway completed an extension from its previous terminus near Shrewsbury to the port at Erieau. The completed line, which ran from Sarnia in the north through Chatham to Erieau, allowed passenger and freight traffic traveling between Lake Erie and destinations further up the Great Lakes to bypass the Detroit River, Lake St. Clair, and the St. Clair River. This fueled Erieau's transformation from a summer colony to a permanent settlement as it became a regular port of entry for goods (particularly coal) coming in from the United States. Erieau continued to grow and, following its incorporation as a village in 1917, gained permanent representation on Kent County Council.

As economic conditions and transportation patterns changed, Erieau's industrial and trade functions declined over time. Its last coal hoist was sold for scrap in 1973, and the next year the section of railroad track connecting the community to Blenheim was abandoned. In 1980, a new marina was dug out on the site of the former coal yard. On January 1, 1998, Erieau was amalgamated into the new Municipality of Chatham-Kent.

== Geography ==
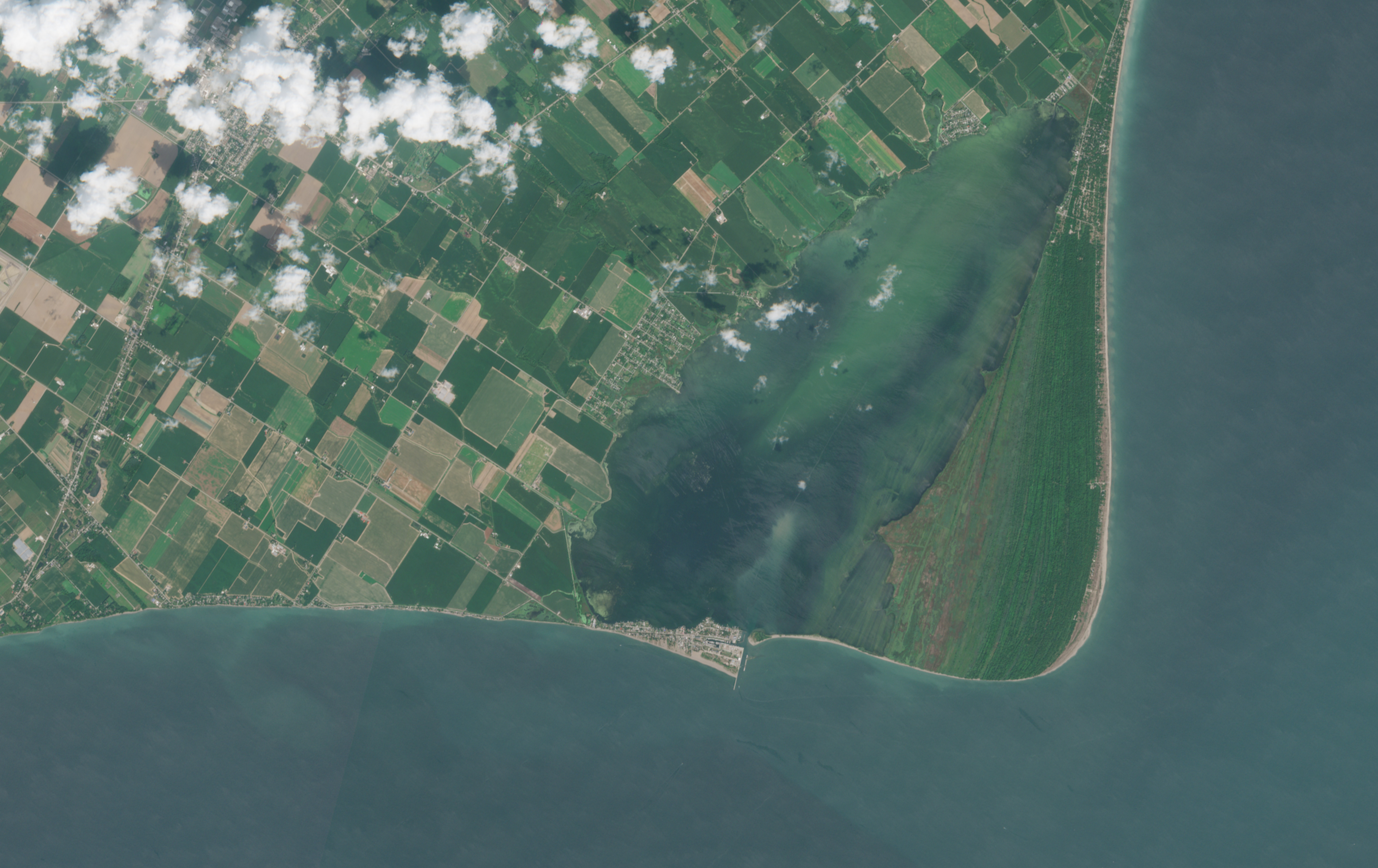
Satellite imagery of Erieau and Rondeau Bay in August 2026

Erieau is located along a narrow peninsula that forms the western mouth of Rondeau Bay. Erieau Beach stretches along most of the peninsula's southern coast along Lake Erie, while the northern coast along Rondeau Bay is largely fronted by single detached dwellings. The eastern edge of the peninsula features a dredged channel allowing passage between the two bodies of water. Erieau Marina, a man-made harbour, is accessed from this channel.

== Climate ==
Climate data for Erieau, Ontario (1991−2020 normals, extremes 1992–2020)
Month	Jan	Feb	Mar	Apr	May	Jun	Jul	Aug	Sep	Oct	Nov	Dec	Year
Record high °C (°F)	11.6 (52.9)	14.5 (58.1)	19.2 (66.6)	24.7 (76.5)	28.6 (83.5)	32.0 (89.6)	32.9 (91.2)	30.2 (86.4)	28.6 (83.5)	24.9 (76.8)	18.7 (65.7)	13.9 (57.0)	32.9 (91.2)
Mean daily maximum °C (°F)	−0.7 (30.7)	−0.6 (30.9)	3.2 (37.8)	9.3 (48.7)	15.3 (59.5)	21.3 (70.3)	24.5 (76.1)	24.4 (75.9)	21.1 (70.0)	14.9 (58.8)	8.6 (47.5)	2.8 (37.0)	12.0 (53.6)
Daily mean °C (°F)	−3.5 (25.7)	−3.4 (25.9)	0.5 (32.9)	6.4 (43.5)	12.5 (54.5)	18.6 (65.5)	21.7 (71.1)	21.7 (71.1)	18.4 (65.1)	12.1 (53.8)	6.0 (42.8)	0.3 (32.5)	9.3 (48.7)
Mean daily minimum °C (°F)	−6.3 (20.7)	−6.3 (20.7)	−2.2 (28.0)	3.5 (38.3)	9.7 (49.5)	15.9 (60.6)	18.8 (65.8)	18.8 (65.8)	15.6 (60.1)	9.2 (48.6)	3.3 (37.9)	−2.1 (28.2)	6.5 (43.7)
Record low °C (°F)	−22 (−8)	−25.1 (−13.2)	−20.6 (−5.1)	−7.7 (18.1)	−1.3 (29.7)	7.1 (44.8)	10.4 (50.7)	10.1 (50.2)	3.8 (38.8)	−0.4 (31.3)	−9.8 (14.4)	−18.5 (−1.3)	−25.1 (−13.2)
Average relative humidity (%) (at 15:00)	75.3	72.8	71.5	69.7	71.8	73.3	70.9	68.0	67.4	66.6	70.4	75.0	71.1
Source: Environment and Climate Change Canada

== Demographics ==
In the 2021 Census of Population conducted by Statistics Canada, Erieau had a population of 363 living in 187 of its 318 total private dwellings, a change of −6.7% from its 2016 population of 389. With a land area of 0.69 km^{2} (0.27 sq mi), it had a population density of 526.1/km^{2} (1,362.6/sq mi) in 2021.

== See also ==
- List of communities in Ontario
- List of designated places in Ontario
