= Chatham-Kent =

- Municipality (single-tier)
- Municipality of Chatham-Kent
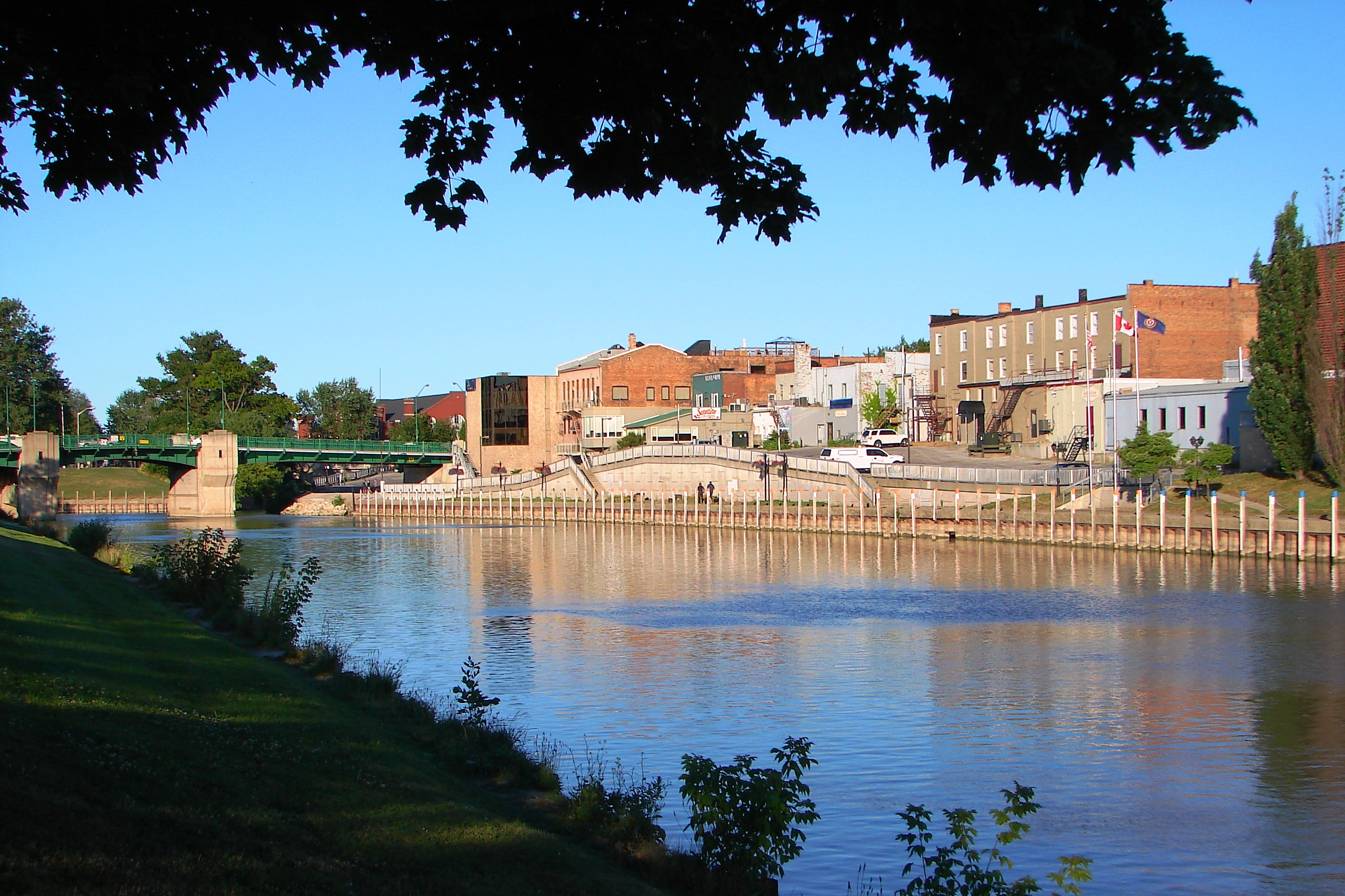
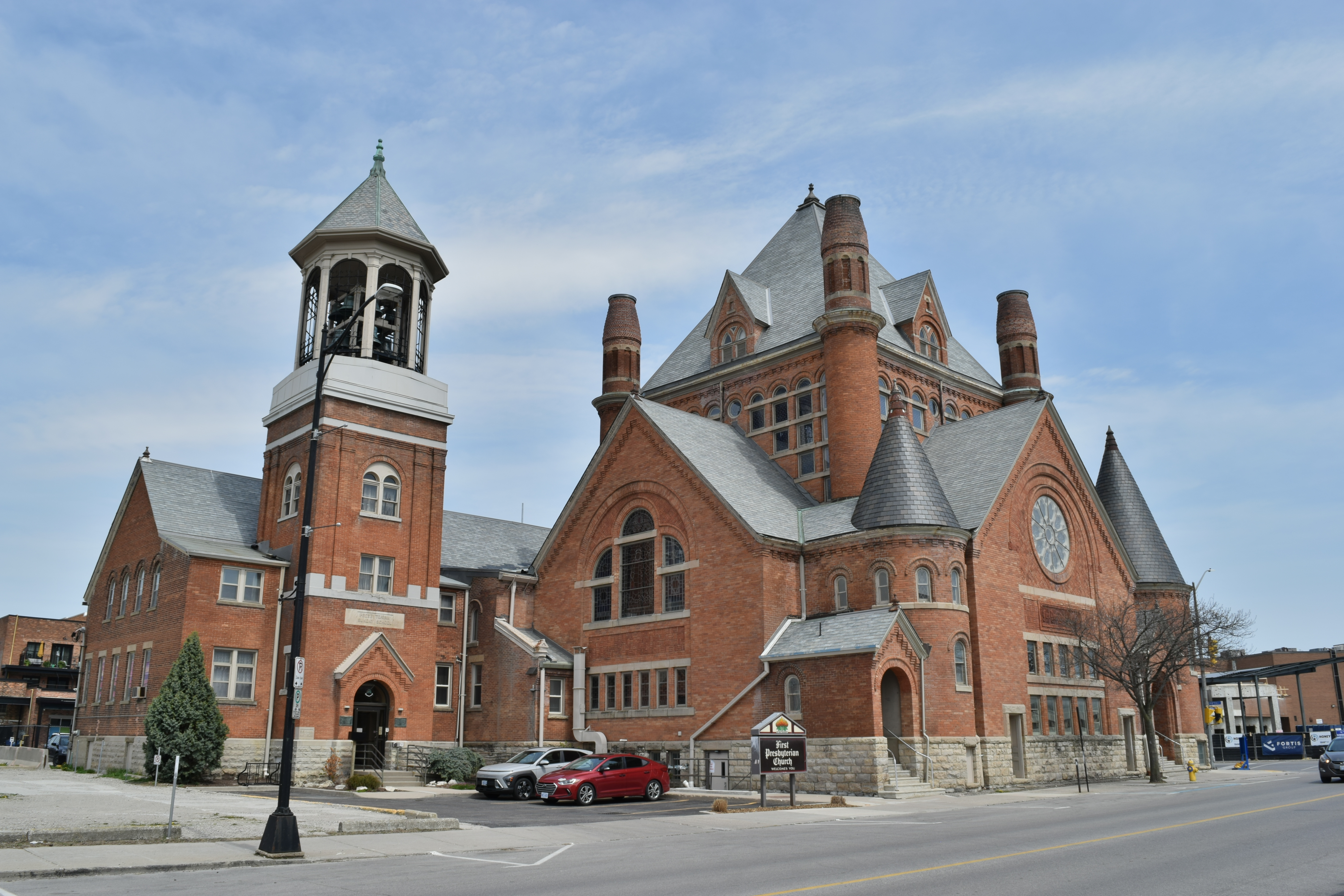
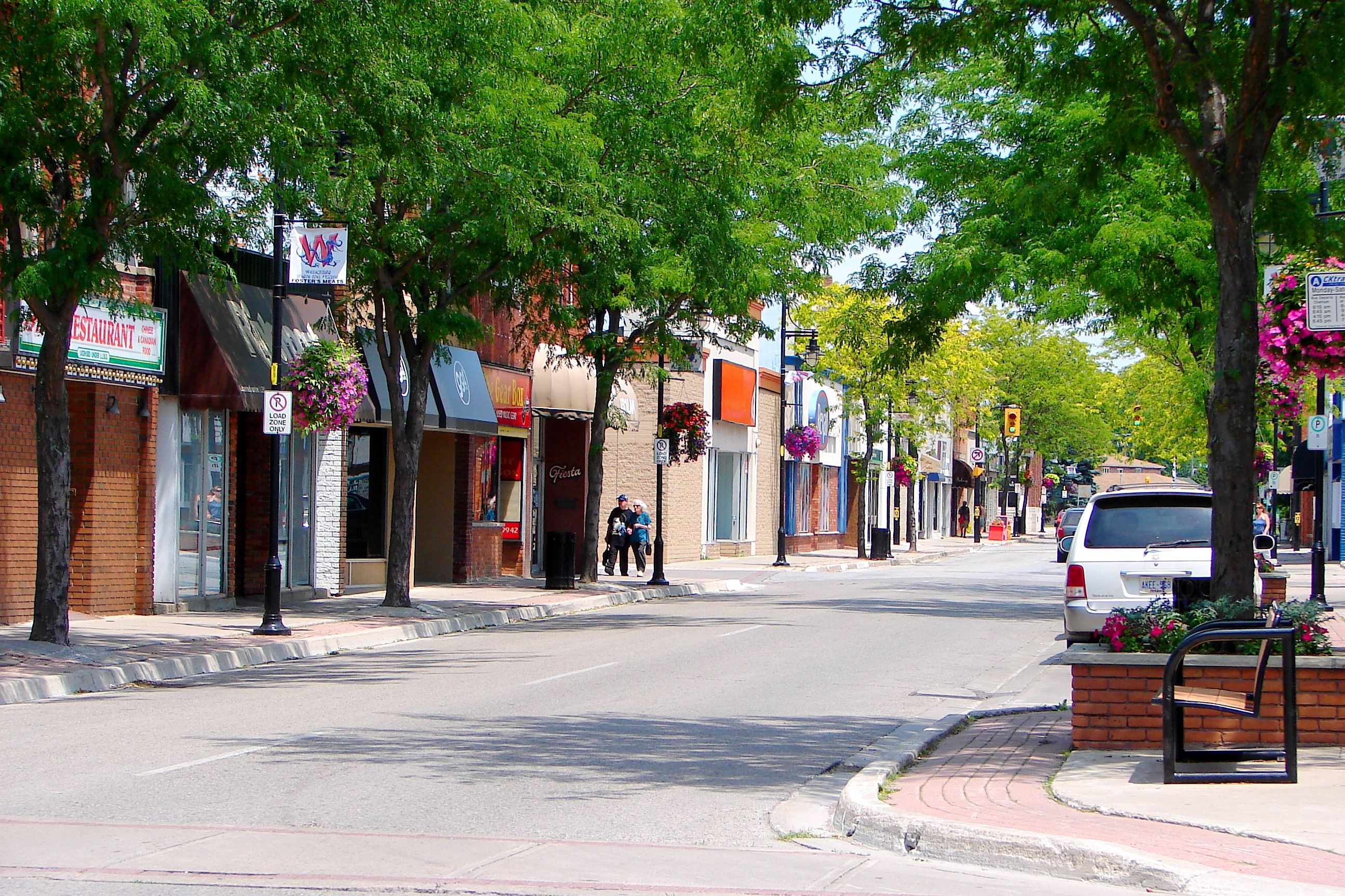
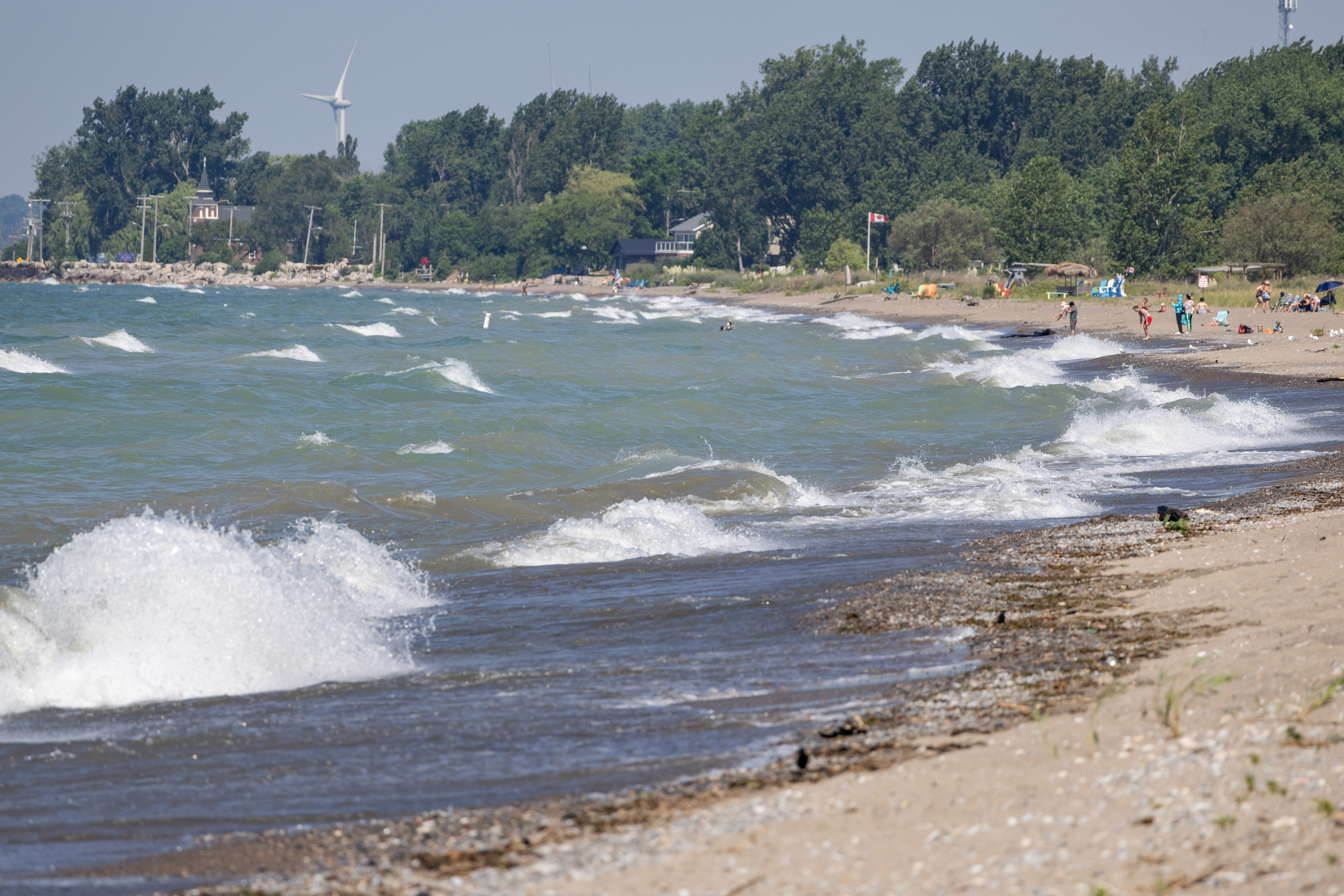
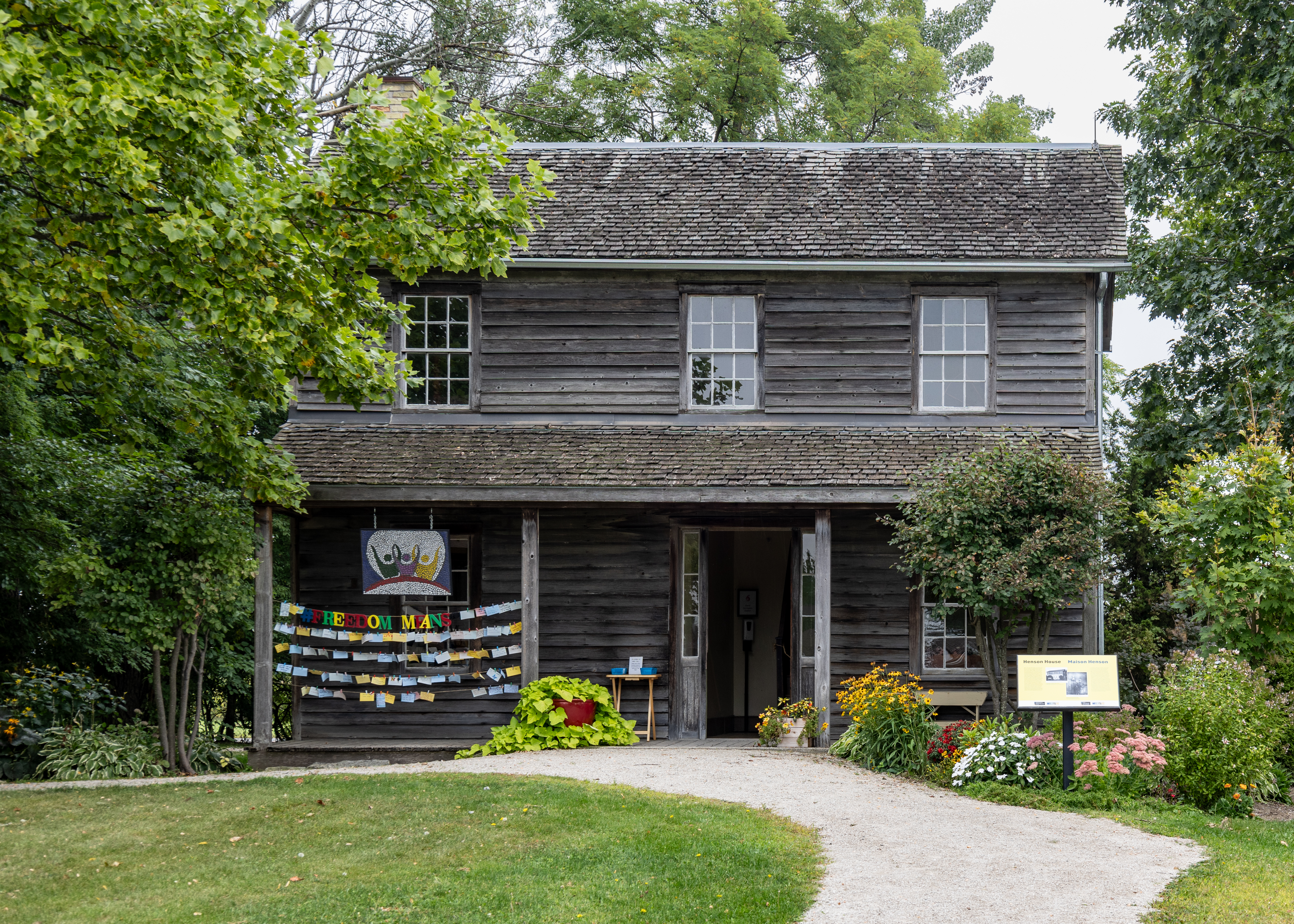
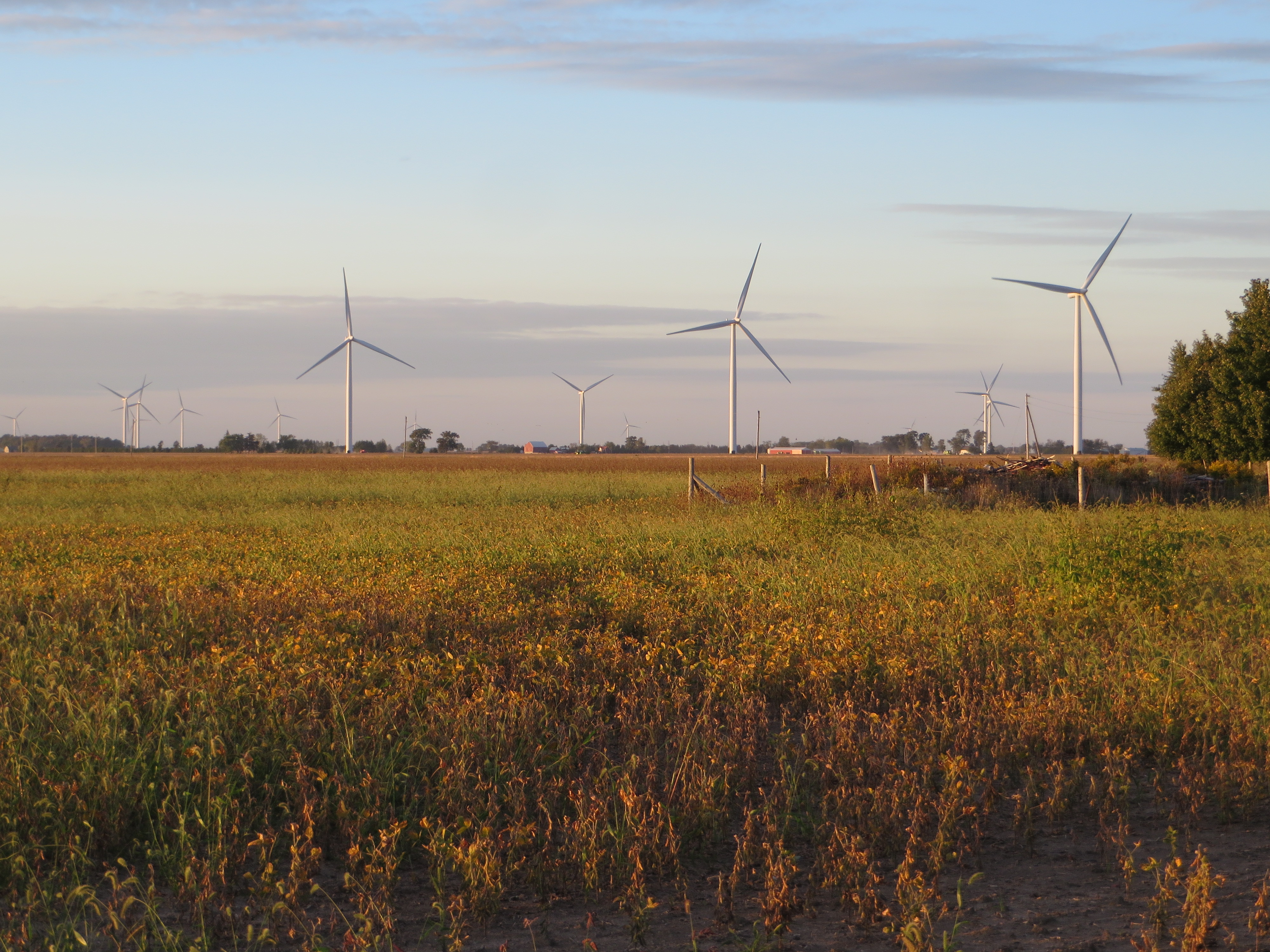
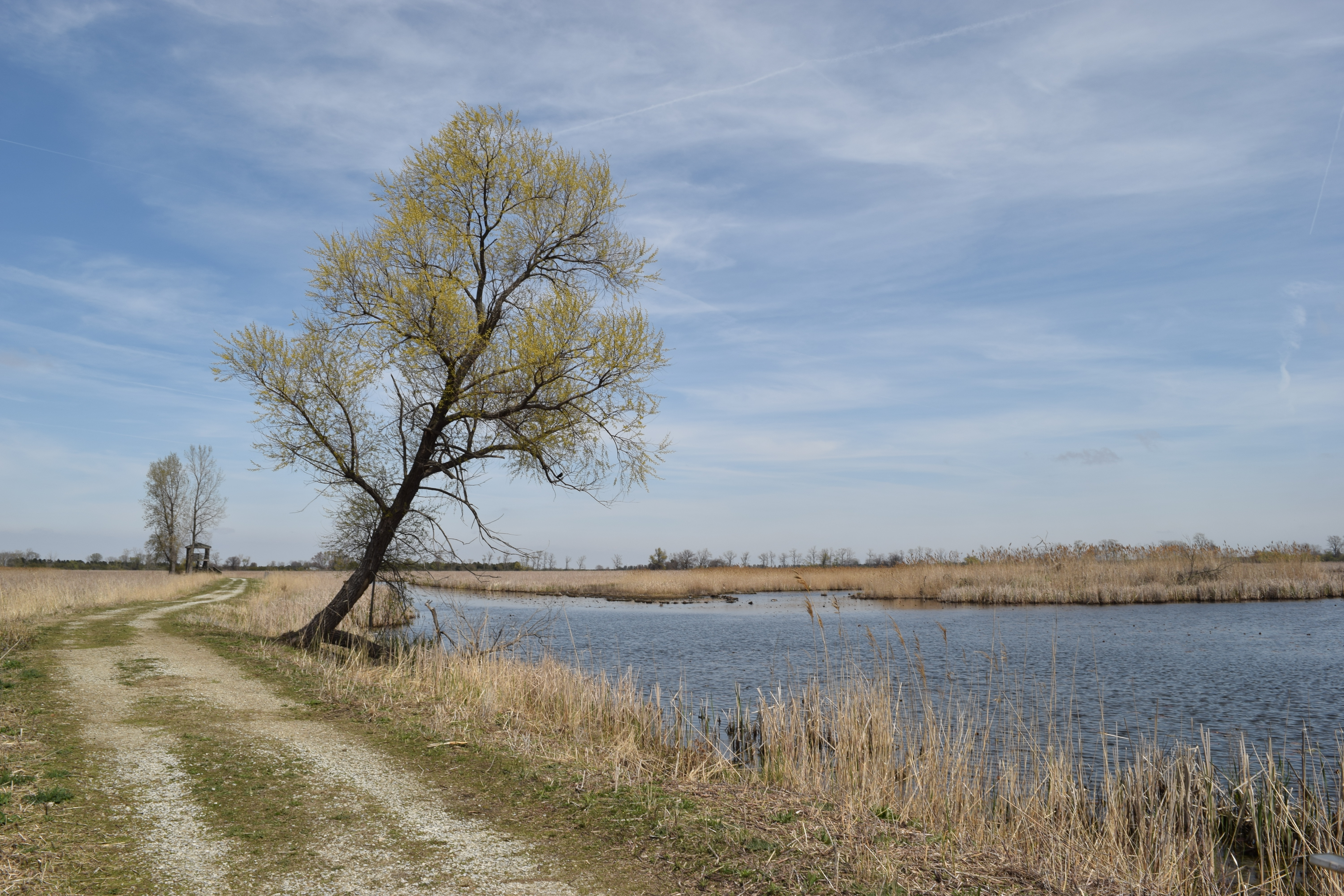
- Downtown Chatham across the Thames River First Presbyterian Church Downtown Wallaceburg Erieau Beach Josiah Henson House Wind Farm St. Clair Wildlife Reserve
- Nicknames: Classic Car Capital of Canada, The Maple City

- Coordinates: 42°24′0″N 82°11′0″W
- Country: Canada
- Province: Ontario
- County (historical): Kent
- Formed by political merger: 1998

Government
  - Mayor: Michael Bondy
  - Governing body: Chatham-Kent Municipal Council
  - MPs: Dave Epp (CPC)
  - MPPs: Trevor Jones (PC); Steve Pinsonneault (PC)

Area
  - Land: 2,457.90 km^{2} (949.00 sq mi)
- Elevation: 198 m (650 ft)

Population (2021)
  - Municipality: 103,988 (Ranked 53rd)
  - Density: 42.3/km^{2} (110/sq mi)
  - Urban: 45,171 (Chatham); 10,323 (Wallaceburg); 4,687 (Tilbury)
  - Census division: 104,316
- Demonym: Chathamite
- Time zone: UTC−5 (Eastern (EST))
  - Summer (DST): UTC−4 (EDT)
- Forward sortation area: N7L to N7M
- Area codes: 519, 226, 548
- Website: www.chatham-kent.ca

Chatham-Kent (2021 population: 103,988) is a single-tier municipality in Southwestern Ontario, Canada. It is mostly rural, and its population centres are Chatham, Wallaceburg, Tilbury, Blenheim, Ridgetown, Wheatley and Dresden. The current Municipality of Chatham-Kent was created in 1998 by the amalgamation of Blenheim, Bothwell, Camden, the City of Chatham, the Township of Chatham, Dover, Dresden, Erie Beach, Erieau, Harwich, Highgate, Howard, Oxford, Raleigh, Ridgetown, Romney, Thamesville, Tilbury East, Tilbury, Wallaceburg, Wheatley and Zone.

The Chatham-Kent census division, which includes the independent Delaware Nation at Moraviantown First Nation, had a population of 104,316 in the 2021 census.

== History ==
The area of Chatham-Kent is part of the traditional territory of the Odawa, Potawatomi, Ojibwe and Wyandot First Nations of Canada. After the Treaty of Paris in 1763 ceded control of the area from the French to the British, it became part of the Territory of Quebec. The title to the Chatham-Kent area was surrendered to the British as part of the 1790 McKee's Purchase, (named for Alexander McKee) to provide land for settlers. McKee's Purchase was designated an Event of National Historic Significance in Canada in 1931. A historical plaque for the purchase is located in Blenheim Park in Blenheim. Indigenous persons remain resident in the area today at the Delaware Nation at Moraviantown and Walpole Island First Nation.

European settlement of the former city of Chatham area began with a naval dockyard in 1792, at the fork of the Thames River with McGregor's Creek. The town was named after William Pitt, 1st Earl of Chatham. It was built as a naval dockyard, a characteristic shared by Chatham, Kent, England. In England, the name Chatham came from the British root ceto and the Old English ham thus meaning a forest settlement. Following the American Revolution and the Gnadenhutten massacre, a group of Christian Munsee settled in what is now the Moraviantown reserve. In the War of 1812, the Battle of the Thames took place between Moraviantown and Thamesville on October 5, 1813.

=== Black population ===
During the 19th century, the area was the northern terminus of the Underground Railroad, and several important local events and area landmarks were important to the abolitionist movement. By the 1850s, the city of Chatham was referred to as the "black mecca of Canada". A museum in the city, the Black Mecca Museum, still bears this name. The small village of North Buxton, a part of the African Canadian Heritage Tour, also played an important role in the Underground Railroad. Chatham-Kent is now part of the African-Canadian Heritage Tour.

Josiah Henson Museum for African-Canadian History, formally known as Uncle Tom's Cabin Historic Site is a museum of the Dawn Settlement, established in 1841 by Josiah Henson near Dresden as refuge for the many slaves who escaped to Canada from the United States.

Militant abolitionist John Brown was in Chatham in 1858 and held a Convention of Colored Men on May 8–10. Black activist Mary Ellen Pleasant, at the time Mrs. James Smith, was also in Chatham at that time. She met with John Brown, who was planning a raid on the Harpers Ferry Arsenal. Brown accepted her financial help and recruited several Chatham-area men to participate in the raid that he led a year later.

Chatham was home to a number of black churches and business, with Black Canadians making up one-third of the city's population and controlling a significant portion of the city's political power. Nearby Dresden and Buxton were also home to thousands of land-owning black residents. However, after the abolition of slavery in the United States, many black families left the area.

Today the city of Chatham is just 3.3% black, with Chatham-Kent as a whole being 2.1% black. Few of the black-owned institutions are still in operation.

=== After slavery ended in the United States ===
In 1846, the town of Chatham had a population of about 1,500, with part of the town being called Chatham North. There were four churches, a theatre, a weekly newspaper and a cricket club. The road between London and Amherstburg was open, and transportation by stagecoach was available. A fast boat also provided transportation to Detroit and Buffalo. Chatham had many tradesman, a foundry, two banks, three schools, a tavern and a library where one could read books and newspapers. By 1869, the population was 3,000 in this industrial area with several mills, foundries, and breweries; a great deal of wood was being produced. A steamboat offered transportation to Windsor and Detroit. There was one bank office.

Automobile manufacturers located in Chatham include Chatham Motor Car Company (1906 and 1909), Gray-Dort Motors (1915 to 1925), and Denby Motor Truck Company of Canada (1919 to 1921). It was also where the Hyslop and Ronald steam fire engine manufacturer was located; the factory would be taken over by Chatham Motor Car. In addition, it hosted meat packer O'Keefe and Drew.

=== Later History ===
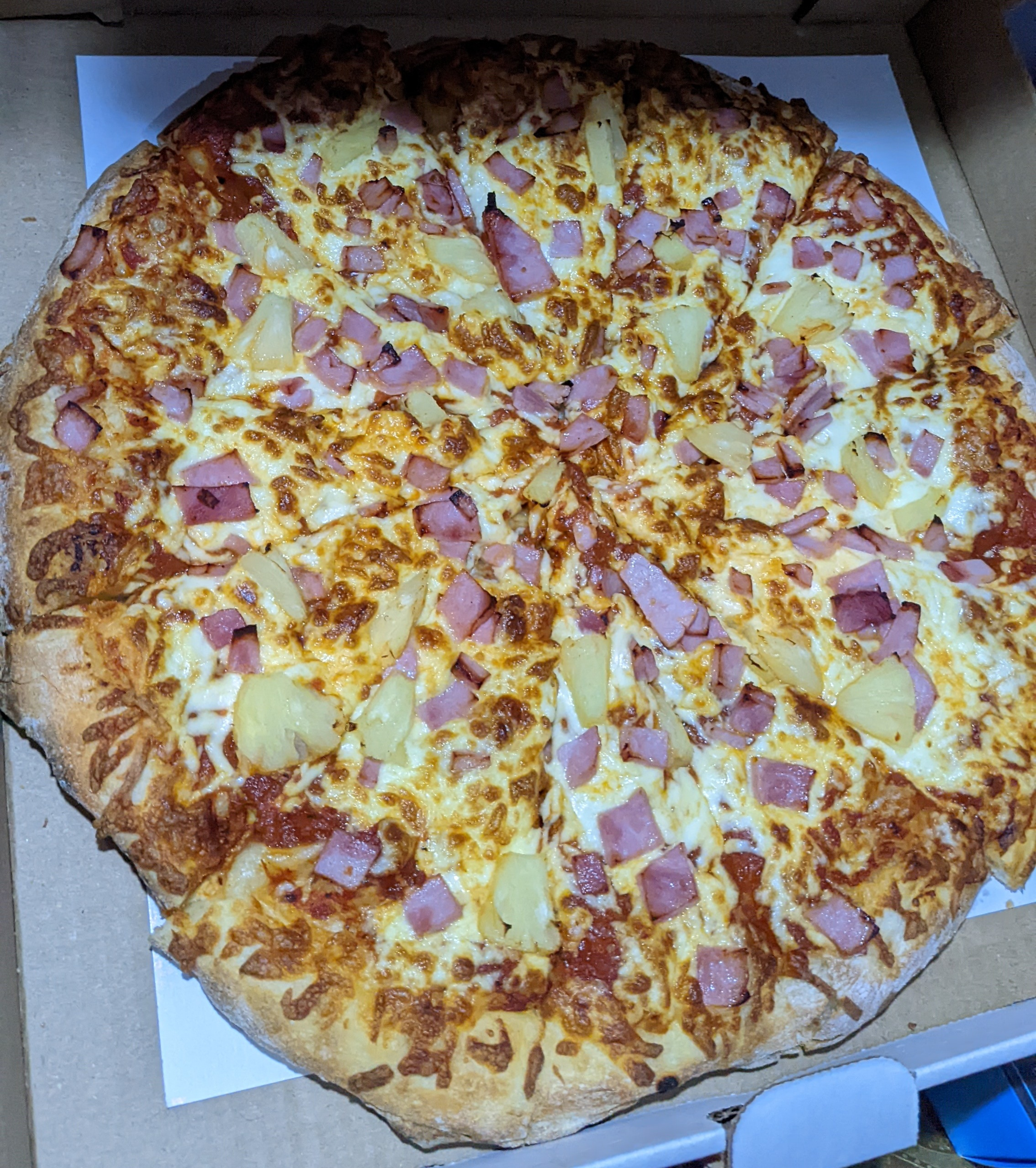
Hawaiian Pizza from Satellite Restaurant

The Hawaiian pizza is claimed to have been invented in Chatham in 1962 at the Satellite Restaurant by Sam Panopoulos.

In 1966, then-Ohio Governor Jim Rhodes proposed building a bridge across Lake Erie linking Cleveland to the southern coast of Kent County.

Early on, Kent County consisted of the townships of Camden, Chatham, Dover, Harwich, Howard, Orford, Raleigh, Romney, Tilbury East and Zone. In some of Canada's earliest post-Confederation censuses, some residences in Kent County were incorrectly reported as being in Bothwell "County", which was a separate electoral district comprising parts of Kent and Lambton counties but not a distinct county in its own right.

In 1998, the County of Kent and the city of Chatham were amalgamated by the Province of Ontario to form the Municipality of Chatham–Kent. Most services were also combined. Since then, bus service has begun to serve all of Chatham-Kent. Starting in 2007, routes were set up to include the former towns of Wallaceburg and Dresden. The Chatham-Kent Fire Department was created from earlier separate departments.

Likewise, the Chatham-Kent Police Service was formed consolidating the police services in the former municipalities of Chatham, Wallaceburg, Dresden, and Tilbury, each of which had had their own departments. Many residents opposed amalgamation, as 18 city councillors boycotted the official vote, and the final decision to amalgamate was imposed on the County by a provincial commissioner. In a study on amalgamations in Ontario from 2003, 48% of respondents in Chatham-Kent felt the value they received as taxpayers became worse after amalgamation, and 64% of respondents still did not think of the community as "the Municipality of Chatham-Kent."

Chatham-Kent has many historic festivals throughout the year, such as the Battle of Longwoods reenactment, which takes place on Labour Day weekend at Fairfield Museum on Longwoods Road. Chatham Kent is also home to many historic buildings which are part of an annual ghost tour offered each year at Halloween. The participants go on a guided walk of downtown while the guide informs them of various ghost stories tied to the local buildings in which they pass. Chatham-Kent was a major part of the Underground Railroad and as such hosts the Buxton Homecoming each September. This celebrates the area's black culture and the roots laid by early black settlers in the Buxton area.

== Communities ==
The Municipality of Chatham-Kent currently consists of the following communities, listed by the Townships of the former Kent County (pre-1998 amalgamation):

- Camden Township:
  - Dresden, Thamesville; Croton, Dawn Mills, North Thamesville; Wabash
- Chatham Township:
  - Chatham, Wallaceburg; Appledore, Arkwood, Darrell, Eberts, Kent Bridge, Louisville, Oldfield, Thornecliffe, Tupperville, Turnerville, Whitebread; Ennett, Riverside
- Dover Township:
  - Mitchell's Bay, Pain Court; Bagnall, Baldoon, Bear Line, Bradley, Dover Centre, Electric, Grande Pointe, Oungah; Bass Haven
- Harwich Township:
  - Blenheim, Erieau, Shrewsbury; Bates Subdivision, Eatonville, Erie Beach, Fargo Station, Guilds, Huffman Corners, Kent Centre, Lake Morningstar Estates, McKay's Corners, Mull, New Scotland, Northwood, Pinehurst, Raglan, Rondeau Bay Estates, Troy, Van Horne, Vosburg, Wilson's Bush; Blenheim Junction, Lynnwood Subdivision, Porkies Corners, Richardson Station, Rushton's Corners
- Howard Township:
  - Morpeth, Ridgetown; Beechwood, Botany, Selton; Slabtown, Trinity
- Oxford Township:
  - Highgate; Clearville, Duart, Muirkirk, Palmyra, Turin; Austen's, Clachan, Henderson's, Lee's
- Raleigh Township:
  - Charing Cross; Dealtown, Doyles, North Buxton, Ouvry, Pardoville, Prairie Siding, Rhodes, Ringold, Sleepy Hollow, South Buxton; Sandison, Southside Estates; Cedar Springs
- Romney Township:
  - Wheatley; Coatsworth, Port Alma, Renwick; Holiday Harbour
- Tilbury East Township:
  - Merlin, Tilbury; Fletcher, Glenwood, Jeannette, Jeannette's Creek, Port Crewe, Quinn, Stevenson, Stewart, Valetta
- Zone Township:
  - Bothwell; Bothwell Station, Briarwood Estates; Fairfield, Zone Centre

== Geography ==
At 2,458 square kilometres (949 mi^{2}), Chatham-Kent is the ninth largest municipality by area in Canada. Over 44,000 of the 107,000 residents live in the former City of Chatham. Other population centres in the municipality include Wallaceburg, Blenheim and Tilbury, Ridgetown and Dresden.

The Lower Thames River runs through Chatham–Kent to Lake St. Clair in the west, while the Sydenham River flows through Wallaceburg and Dresden. The municipality has approximately 88 kilometres of shoreline along lake Erie and 24 kilometres along lake St. Clair.

The Indian reserve of Bkejwanong (commonly referred to as Walpole Island) borders on Chatham–Kent, whereas the Indian reserve of Moravian 47 is an enclave within the city and is part of the Chatham–Kent census agglomeration and census division.

=== Climate ===
Chatham-Kent has a humid continental climate (Köppen climate classification Dfa), with cold, snowy winters and warm to hot, humid summers. A typical summer will feature heat waves with temperatures exceeding 30 °C (86 °F) often. Winters are cold, and feature occasional cold snaps bringing temperatures below −15 °C (5 °F), but also commonly include mild stretches of weather above freezing.

Climate data for Chatham-Kent, Ontario, Canada (1981–2010, extremes 1889–present (Note: Long term records have been recorded at various climate stations in or nearby Chatham-Kent since 1889))
Month	Jan	Feb	Mar	Apr	May	Jun	Jul	Aug	Sep	Oct	Nov	Dec	Year
Record high °C (°F)	17.8 (64.0)	19.0 (66.2)	26.7 (80.1)	32.8 (91.0)	36.1 (97.0)	38.5 (101.3)	40.0 (104.0)	41.1 (106.0)	36.7 (98.1)	32.2 (90.0)	25.6 (78.1)	19.0 (66.2)	41.1 (106.0)
Mean daily maximum °C (°F)	−0.3 (31.5)	1.2 (34.2)	6.0 (42.8)	13.5 (56.3)	19.9 (67.8)	25.5 (77.9)	27.7 (81.9)	26.5 (79.7)	22.7 (72.9)	15.5 (59.9)	8.5 (47.3)	2.1 (35.8)	14.1 (57.4)
Daily mean °C (°F)	−3.6 (25.5)	−2.4 (27.7)	1.9 (35.4)	8.5 (47.3)	14.6 (58.3)	20.3 (68.5)	22.6 (72.7)	21.6 (70.9)	17.8 (64.0)	11.3 (52.3)	5.2 (41.4)	−0.9 (30.4)	9.8 (49.6)
Mean daily minimum °C (°F)	−6.9 (19.6)	−5.9 (21.4)	−2.2 (28.0)	3.6 (38.5)	9.4 (48.9)	15.0 (59.0)	17.5 (63.5)	16.7 (62.1)	13.0 (55.4)	6.9 (44.4)	1.8 (35.2)	−3.9 (25.0)	5.4 (41.7)
Record low °C (°F)	−27.4 (−17.3)	−31.9 (−25.4)	−25.1 (−13.2)	−13.9 (7.0)	−4.5 (23.9)	−0.6 (30.9)	2.8 (37.0)	2.8 (37.0)	−1.7 (28.9)	−7.2 (19.0)	−18.5 (−1.3)	−27 (−17)	−31.9 (−25.4)
Average precipitation mm (inches)	62.7 (2.47)	54.1 (2.13)	59.9 (2.36)	79.7 (3.14)	79.7 (3.14)	77.9 (3.07)	85.4 (3.36)	79.3 (3.12)	89.1 (3.51)	70.7 (2.78)	76.8 (3.02)	67.0 (2.64)	882.3 (34.74)
Average rainfall mm (inches)	31.6 (1.24)	36.5 (1.44)	48.6 (1.91)	78.3 (3.08)	79.7 (3.14)	77.9 (3.07)	85.4 (3.36)	79.3 (3.12)	89.1 (3.51)	70.7 (2.78)	75.0 (2.95)	51.1 (2.01)	803.1 (31.62)
Average snowfall cm (inches)	31.1 (12.2)	17.6 (6.9)	11.3 (4.4)	1.4 (0.6)	0.0 (0.0)	0.0 (0.0)	0.0 (0.0)	0.0 (0.0)	0.0 (0.0)	0.0 (0.0)	1.7 (0.7)	15.9 (6.3)	79.2 (31.2)
Average precipitation days (≥ 0.2 mm)	12.5	9.3	11.0	13.5	13.3	10.9	9.7	9.6	10.2	11.9	12.6	12.7	137.1
Average rainy days (≥ 0.2 mm)	5.4	5.2	8.4	13.1	13.3	10.9	9.7	9.6	10.2	11.9	11.9	8.3	118.0
Average snowy days (≥ 0.2 cm)	7.5	4.7	3.5	0.83	0.0	0.0	0.0	0.0	0.0	0.04	0.88	5.0	22.4
Source: Environment Canada

=== Adjacent townships and municipalities ===
- St Clair and Dawn-Euphemia (north and northwest)
- Southwest Middlesex (northeast)
- West Elgin (northeast and east)
- Across Lake Erie: the City of Cleveland and Cuyahoga, Lorain and Erie Counties, Ohio, US (south)
- Lakeshore, Ontario and Leamington, Ontario (southwest and west)
- Across Lake St. Clair: Macomb and St. Clair Counties, Michigan, US (west)

== Demographics ==
In the 2021 Census of Population conducted by Statistics Canada, Chatham-Kent had a population of 103,988 living in 44,028 of its 46,752 total private dwellings, a change of 2.3% from its 2016 population of 101,647. With a land area of 2,451.9 km^{2} (946.7 sq mi), it had a population density of 42.4/km^{2} (109.8/sq mi) in 2021.

Canada census – Chatham-Kent community profile

	2021	2016	2011
Population	103,988 (+2.3% from 2016)	101,647 (-2.0% from 2011)	103,671 (-4.2% from 2006)
Land area	2,451.90 km^{2} (946.68 sq mi)	2,457.90 km^{2} (949.00 sq mi)	2,458.09 km^{2} (949.07 sq mi)
Population density	42.4/km^{2} (110/sq mi)	41.4/km^{2} (107/sq mi)	42.2/km^{2} (109/sq mi)
Median age	46.4 (M: 44.8, F: 47.6)	45.9 (M: 44.6, F: 47.0)	43.9 (M: 42.6, F: 45.1)
Private dwellings	46,752 (total) 44,028 (occupied)	46,103 (total)	46,209 (total)
Median household income	$72,000	$58,264

References: 2021 2016 2011

=== Ethnicity ===
Panethnic groups in the Municipality of Chatham-Kent (2001−2021)
Panethnic group	2021		2016		2011		2006		2001	
Panethnic group	Pop.	%	Pop.	%	Pop.	%	Pop.	%	Pop.	%
European (Note: Statistic includes all persons that did not make up part of a visible minority or an indigenous identity.)	90,830	89.25%	91,175	91.74%	94,760	93.19%	99,860	93.56%	99,720	94.54%
Indigenous	4,245	4.17%	3,680	3.7%	2,910	2.86%	2,320	2.17%	1,725	1.64%
African	2,600	2.55%	2,125	2.14%	1,890	1.86%	2,190	2.05%	2,130	2.02%
South Asian	1,315	1.29%	630	0.63%	485	0.48%	610	0.57%	315	0.3%
Southeast Asian (Note: Statistic includes total responses of "Filipino" and "Southeast Asian" under visible minority section on census.)	895	0.88%	535	0.54%	485	0.48%	550	0.52%	465	0.44%
East Asian (Note: Statistic includes total responses of "Chinese", "Korean", and "Japanese" under visible minority section on census.)	590	0.58%	595	0.6%	560	0.55%	610	0.57%	680	0.64%
Latin American	485	0.48%	200	0.2%	350	0.34%	235	0.22%	125	0.12%
Middle Eastern (Note: Statistic includes total responses of "West Asian" and "Arab" under visible minority section on census.)	380	0.37%	195	0.2%	115	0.11%	175	0.16%	190	0.18%
Other (Note: Statistic includes total responses of "Visible minority, n.i.e." and "Multiple visible minorities" under visible minority section on census.)	425	0.42%	260	0.26%	130	0.13%	175	0.16%	125	0.12%
Total responses	101,765	97.86%	99,385	97.77%	101,680	98.08%	106,735	98.67%	105,480	98.27%
Total population	103,988	100%	101,647	100%	103,671	100%	108,177	100%	107,341	100%

- Note: Totals greater than 100% due to multiple origin responses.

2006 census
For all groups that comprise at least 1% of the population. Note that a person can report more than one ethnic origin.

- "Canadian": 34.7%
- English: 32.9%
- French: 21.9%
- Scottish: 20.2%
- Irish: 19.1%
- German: 12.2%
- Dutch: 11.1%
- Belgian: 5.9%
- First Nations: 3.1%
- Italian: 2.1%
- African descent: 2.1%
- Polish: 2.1%
- Ukrainian: 2.0%
- Welsh: 1.5%
- Czech: 1.4%
- Metis: 1.2%
- American (modern immigrant): 1.2%
- Hungarian: 1.2%
- Portuguese: 1.2%
- Mexican: 1.0%

=== Language ===
Although most of the population of Chatham-Kent is English-speaking, a few of its communities and Catholic parishes were settled by francophone (French-speaking) farmers in the mid-nineteenth century. These include Pain Court, Tilbury and Grande Pointe, where French is still spoken by a significant percentage of the population. These communities are designated French language service areas under Ontario's French Language Services Act.

Approximately 8,500 residents of Chatham-Kent have French as a mother tongue and 1,500 have French as their home language. Essex County also has a relatively large francophone population, especially in the municipality of Lakeshore. Together, Chatham–Kent and Essex Counties make up one of the concentrations of Franco-Ontarians in the province of Ontario.

Both elementary and secondary francophone schools exist across the municipality. A French socio-cultural organization, La Girouette, which is based in Chatham, promotes French-Canadian culture and language in the area.

Knowledge of official language statistics:

- English only: 92.2%
- French only: <0.1%
- English and French: 7.2%
- Neither English nor French: 0.5%

== Economy and industry ==
A breakdown of the total labour force in Chatham-Kent shows the leading industries (NAICS) are manufacturing, health care, and retail:

- Manufacturing: 12.9%
- Health care and social assistance: 12.3%
- Retail trade: 11.2%
- Agriculture, forestry, fishing and hunting: 7.5%
- Accommodation and food services: 6.7%
- Construction: 6.5%
- Educational services: 5.9%
- Transportation and warehousing: 5.0%
- Administrative and support, waste management and remediation services: 5.0%
- Public administration: 4.4%

=== Agribusiness and chemical ===
At the outskirts of Chatham is the headquarters for Corteva Agriscience (Formerly Pioneer ), a major agricultural seed breeding and biotechnology company.

GreenField Specialty Alcohols Inc.'s Commercial Alcohols division, Canada's largest ethanol plant and one of the world's largest, opened in Chatham in 1996. The plant produces ethanol for industrial, medical, and beverage uses.

There are a number of vineyards in the municipality.

=== Automotive ===
Chatham's roots in the automotive sector go back to Gray-Dort Motors Ltd., one of Canada's earliest automobile manufacturers. In the 21st century, auto industry plants in the municipality include Autoliv Canada in Tilbury (airbags), Mahle in Tilbury (emissions controls and plastics), in Ridgetown (automotive electronic pedal assembly and sensors), Dana Canada in Chatham (heat shields for thermal and acoustic management of exhaust manifolds, catalytic converters, and turbochargers), and Vitesco Technologies (Powertrain Canada ULC) in Chatham (design, development, and testing of Actuators for clean, efficient vehicles).

Chatham-Kent also is home to RM Auctions, a vintage automobile auction house, and RM Restorations, a vintage automobile restoration company. The nickname "The Classic Car Capital of Canada" comes from the abundance of classic car events in the community.

=== Energy ===
Chatham is home to a major corporate office of Enbridge Gas Inc., a natural gas utility and Enbridge company. Other energy related companies include wind farms near the shores of Lake Erie.

=== Public sector ===
The Canadian Federal government is one of the largest employers in the Chatham-Kent area with over 450 employees in several departments in the area. The Canada Pension Plan (CPP) Disability Unit is housed in the Judy Lamarsh (see Notable Residents) Building in downtown Chatham. This federal office is the single largest disability processing centre in Canada, processing 50% of all CPP Disability benefits. The office also processes Old Age Security benefit claims.

=== Retail hub ===
Chatham serves as a retail centre for the municipality and surrounding area. This includes the large big-box stores in Super Centre on St. Clair Street. Wallaceburg also houses a number of big box stores and fast food locations.

== Attractions ==
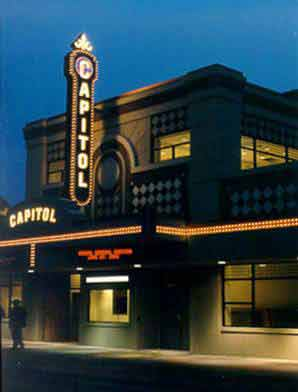
Capitol Theatre

The long, white sandy beaches, fishing, hiking trails and conservation areas make Erieau a popular vacation spot.

There are two Provincial Parks in Chatham-Kent: Rondeau Provincial Park and Wheatley Provincial Park, There are also numerous local conservation areas.

Downtown Chatham is home to the annual "Retrofest" organized by the Historic Downtown Chatham BIA, in partnership with the Kent Historic Auto Club. Hundreds of classic car enthusiasts travel to downtown Chatham to showcase their classic cars and vintage vehicles.

Chatham was home to the Wheels Inn, a family resort for four decades until its closure in 2010. In 2011, the Chatham-Kent John D. Bradley Convention Centre was constructed on the site of the Wheels Inn. In July 2019, a new Cascades casino was opened in Chatham, close to the Convention Centre on Richmond Street.

== Arts and culture ==
Downtown Chatham is home to the Capitol Theatre opened in 1930 as the largest in the region, and extensively restored from 1995 to 2010. The theatre is run by the Municipality of Chatham-Kent and hosts shows and entertainers.

The Thames Art Gallery and ARTspace, located in the historic downtown, feature exhibitions showcasing local artists from the Chatham-Kent area, while also housing other Canadian and international works.

Numerous car shows are hosted annually throughout the year in downtown Chatham earning it the name Canada's Classic Car Capitol.

== Health care ==
Chatham-Kent is served by the Chatham-Kent Health Alliance. The Public General Hospital and St. Joseph Hospital are a single campus in Chatham, while the former Sydenham District Hospital remains in Wallaceburg. The eastern portion of the municipality is served by the Four Counties Health Services in Newbury in nearby Middlesex County.

Chatham is a location within the Ontario Health atHome network, providing health care services, supported living programs for people at home, and long-term care throughout the Chatham-Kent community.

== Media ==
=== Television stations ===
OTA virtual channel (PSIP)	OTA actual channel	Call sign	Network	Notes
16.1	16 (UHF)	CHWI-DT	CTV 2	
33.1	33 (UHF)	CICO-DT-59	TVOntario	Rebroadcaster of CICA-DT (Toronto)

Chatham-Kent is also served by stations coming from Windsor, London, Detroit, Toledo, and Cleveland.

=== Radio broadcast stations ===
Frequency	Call sign	Branding	Format	Owner	Notes
FM 88.1	CBEE-FM	CBC Radio One	Talk radio, public radio	Canadian Broadcasting Corporation	Rebroadcaster of CBEW-FM (Windsor)
FM 89.3	CKGW-FM	UCB Canada	Christian radio	United Christian Broadcasters Canada	
FM 91.3	CFCO-FM	Big Country 91.3	Country music	Blackburn Radio	AM 630 and 92.9 FM CFCO moved to 91.3 FM on April 25, 2026.
FM 94.3	CKSY-FM	94–3 CKSY	Adult contemporary	Blackburn Radio	
FM 95.1	CKUE-FM	Canada's Cool FM	Classic rock	Blackburn Radio	
FM 99.1	CKXS-FM	99.1	Hot adult contemporary	Five Amigos Broadcasting	

=== Print media ===
The Chatham Daily News is the only daily newspaper in Chatham-Kent. There are several weeklies located in Chatham and the various communities in the municipality, including the Chatham Voice, Wallaceburg Courier Press, the Blenheim News Tribune, Chatham-Kent This Week, Ridgetown Independent News, Tilbury Times, and the Wheatley Journal.

The Chatham Daily News, Chatham-Kent This Week, and Wallaceburg Courier Press are all owned by Postmedia.

=== Online media ===
The Chatham Daily News, Chatham-Kent This Week, Wallaceburg Courier Press, Chatham Voice and CKReview are daily online news media in Chatham-Kent with coverage of local news, sports, entertainment, and cultural events as well as a number of regular contributing columnists. The Chatham-Kent Sports Network is an online source covering local sports news, scores, and highlights from each of Chatham-Kent's communities. CKSN also follows Chatham-Kent athletes who have progressed to the Junior, College, International, or Professional ranks.

== Education ==
=== Elementary and secondary ===
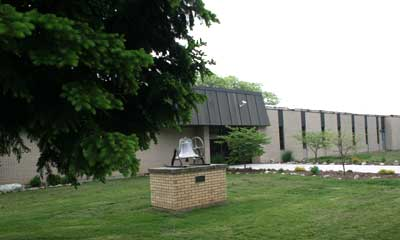
Chatham Regional Education Centre of the Lambton Kent District School Board

There are two anglophone school boards and one francophone school board in Chatham–Kent. These are the Lambton Kent District School Board (headquartered in both Chatham and Sarnia), the St. Clair Catholic District School Board (headquartered in Wallaceburg) and the Conseil scolaire catholique Providence (CSC Providence). The LKDSB is a public school board, and consists of 13 secondary and 53 elementary schools. Chatham-Kent Secondary School is the largest public high school in Lambton-Kent. The St. Clair Catholic board consists of two secondary schools (one in Chatham and one in Sarnia) and 26 elementary schools. There are also independent schools, such as Wallaceburg Christian School and Chatham Christian Schools—an elementary and secondary school in the same building.

The French Catholic board, headquartered in Windsor, has its Chatham-Kent regional office in Pain Court and consists of four elementary schools and one high school.

=== Post-secondary ===
Chatham–Kent is the home of two colleges – St. Clair College and University of Guelph Ridgetown Campus, popularly known as Ridgetown College.

St. Clair College is a satellite of St. Clair College of Windsor. There are two campuses located in the municipality – Thames Campus (located in Chatham) and the Wallaceburg Campus (located in Wallaceburg). More than 5,000 full-time and 12,000 part-time students attend the college each year.

The Ridgetown Campus of the University of Guelph offers diplomas in agriculture, horticulture, and veterinary technology. It is part of the University of Guelph's Ontario Agricultural College, and formerly known as Ridgetown College of Agricultural Technology.

== Sports ==
=== Baseball ===
The Chatham-Kent Barnstormers are a professional baseball team that plays in the Canadian Baseball League.

=== Hockey ===
The Chatham Maroons are a team in the Greater Ontario Junior Hockey League.

There are also four teams in the Great Lakes Junior C Hockey League

- Blenheim Blades
- Dresden Jr. Kings
- Wheatley Sharks
- Wallaceburg Lakers

Other teams in Chatham-Kent include CK CRUSH (Chatham Girls Minor Hockey Association), the Chatham AAA Cyclones and the A Kent Cobras.

=== Rugby Union football ===
Founded in 2001, the Chatham-Kent Havoc rugby team plays in the Southwest Rugby Union.

== Transportation ==
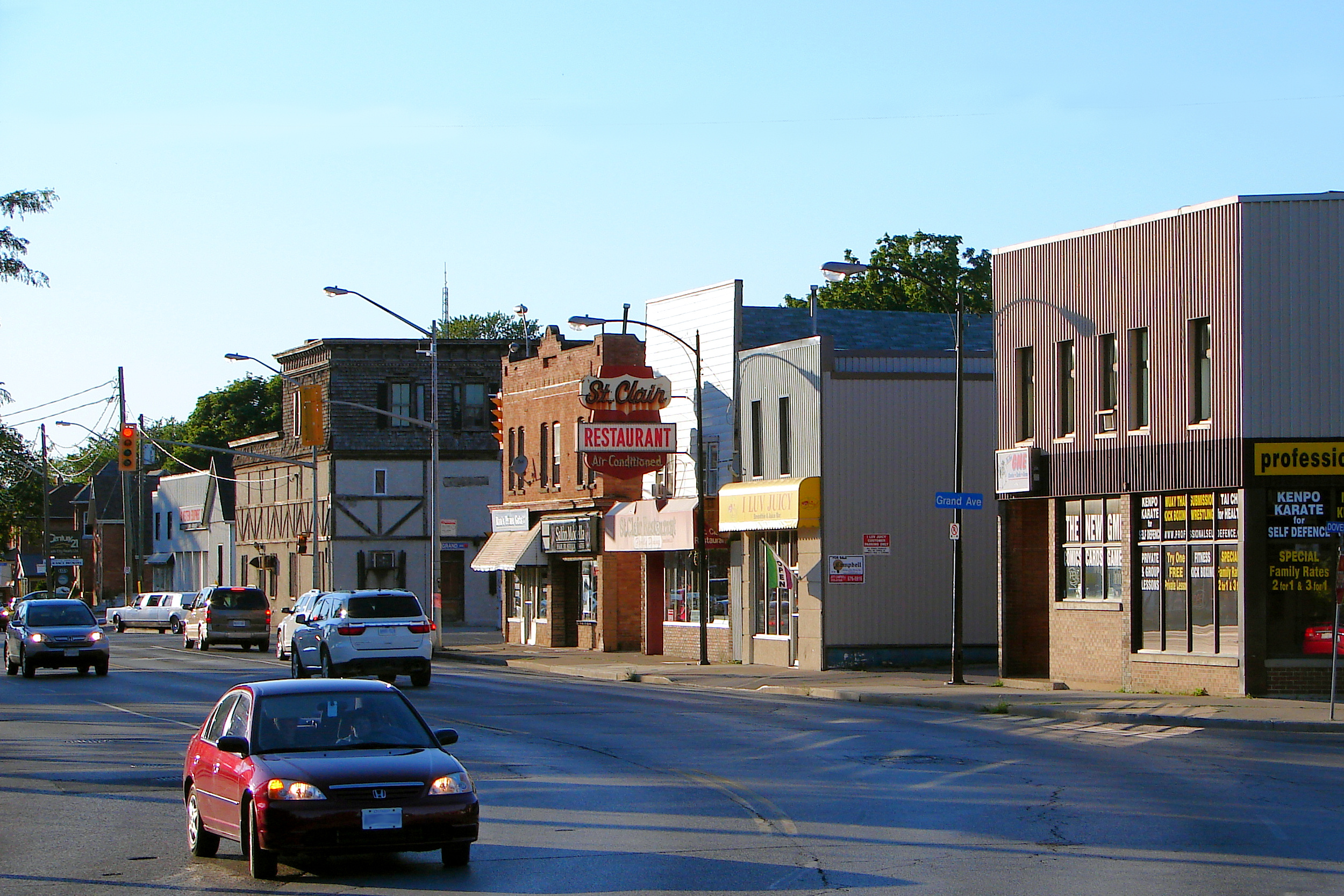
St. Clair Street (Hwy 40) in Chatham, 2012

=== Road ===
Chatham-Kent is situated just off Highway 401, connecting Montreal, Toronto, Kitchener-Waterloo, London, and Windsor, Ontario; and Detroit, Michigan via the Ambassador Bridge. Blenheim, Chatham and Wallaceburg are linked with Sarnia, Ontario and the Blue Water Bridge to the United States by Highway 40.

The sections of Highway 2 and Highway 3 (the Talbot Trail) in Chatham–Kent were downloaded by the province in 1998, becoming local roads 2 and 3, but they remain significant through routes and are still locally known by their old names.

The first gas station in Canada to sell E85 fuel to the public is located on Park Avenue East in Chatham.

=== Rail ===
Chatham station is served by Via Rail passenger services between Toronto and Windsor, part of the Quebec City – Windsor Corridor with four trips in each direction daily, and the community is served by both the Canadian National Railway and the Canadian Pacific Railway for freight transportation.

=== Bus ===
Within Chatham public bus services are provided by CK Transit. Chatham-Kent has an intercity bus service, also provided by CK Transit, between all communities in the municipality except Wheatley.

=== Air ===
There is a municipal airport located 14 km south east of Chatham featuring a 1500m paved, lighted runway, with refuelling facilities, tie-down services, pilot training and chartered flights. The nearest airports served by regional carriers are Windsor and London.

== Notable people ==
- Sally Ainse – Oneida diplomat and fur trader
- Chris Allen – former NHL player with the Florida Panthers
- Doug Anakin – won a gold medal at the 1964 Olympics in the bobsled
- Bill Atkinson – former Major League Baseball relief pitcher
- Courtney Babcock – Olympic distance runner
- Shae-Lynn Bourne – championship figure skater
- T. J. Brodie – Former NHL hockey player, currently a free agent
- Ernest Burgess – 24th President of the American Sociological Association, author and urban sociologist who is known for his groundbreaking social ecology research
- June Callwood – prominent magazine writer in the 1950s who became an Officer in the Order of Canada in 1986
- Joseph Caron – former High Commissioner to India and former Canadian ambassador to China and Japan
- Bridget Carleton – WNBA player for the Portland Fire
- Chandra K. Clarke – entrepreneur, published author, and humour columnist
- James Couzens – U.S. Senator, Mayor of Detroit, industrialist, philanthropist, and vice president and general manager of the Ford Motor Company
- Robertson Davies – novelist, playwright
- Kenne Duncan – western/action movie actor
- Andy Fantuz – former CIS offensive MVP, former slotback for the Saskatchewan Roughriders and Hamilton Tiger Cats of the CFL
- Wally Floody – the "Tunnel King" from The Great Escape
- Dave Gagner – retired NHL hockey player; brother-in-law of Diane Gagner; former Chatham–Kent mayor
- W. B. George (1899–1972), president of the Canadian Amateur Hockey Association and agriculturalist at Kemptville Agricultural School, was born in Highgate
- Ashley Goure – Paralympic sledge hockey player
- Lee Giffin – professional ice hockey player
- Frank Gross, philanthropist; awarded the Ontario Medal for Good Citizenship in 2006
- Ken Houston (born September 15, 1953) – former NHL player
- Tracey Hoyt – actress, Aurora Farqueson on the CBC Television series The Tournament
- Jeff Jackson – NHL hockey player
- Ferguson Jenkins – Baseball Hall of Famer
- Anna H. Jones – teacher, speaker at the First Pan-African Conference in 1900
- Ryan Jones – former finalist of 2008 Hobey Baker Award and former member of the Edmonton Oilers; currently playing in the DEL for the Cologne Sharks
- Judy LaMarsh – former Canadian Minister of Health
- Archibald Lampman – one of Canada's finest 19th-century Romantic poets, born Morpeth, Kent County, 1861
- Bobbi Lancaster, a medical doctor and trans woman noted for playing in the LPGA Qualifying Tournament in 2013
- Lori Lansens – author of Rush Home Road and The Girls
- Chad Laprise – UFC fighter
- John B. Lee – author, poet and current Poet Laureate of Brantford, Ontario
- Jessie McPherson - professional ice hockey goaltender for the Toronto Sceptres
- Doug Melvin – general manager of the Milwaukee Brewers
- Harry Garnet Bedford Miner – Victoria Cross winner during World War I, born in Cedar Springs
- Dave Nichol – award-winning product marketing expert and former president of Loblaw's
- Geoffrey O'Hara – early 20th-century composer, singer and music professor who was the writer of such popular songs as the 1918 hit "K-K-K-Katy"
- Sam Panopoulos – inventor of the Hawaiian pizza
- Ron Pardo – comic-impressionist; actor for History Bites and voice actor on animated shows like PAW Patrol and World of Quest; from Pardoville
- Ray Robertson – novelist
- Brooklyn Roebuck – 2012 The Next Star; under licence with Sony Music Canada
- Doug Shedden – professional ice hockey coach and former player
- Glen Skov – National Hockey League (NHL) hockey player
- Ron Sparks – award-winning comedian, actor, writer and producer (Video on Trial)
- Joseph Storey – architect, designer of many local landmarks in the 1950s and 1960s
- Shaun Suisham – Pittsburgh Steelers kicker (formerly with Dallas Cowboys and Washington Redskins)
- Sylvia Tyson – singer-songwriter, broadcaster, and guitarist who found early fame with her then-husband Ian Tyson in their folk duo Ian and Sylvia
- Todd Warriner – former NHL hockey player picked 4th overall in the 1992 NHL entry draft by the Quebec Nordiques
- Derek Whitson – Paralympic sledge hockey player
- Brian Wiseman – 1999 IHL MVP Houston Aeros
- Michelle Wright – country music singer

== See also ==
- List of townships in Ontario
- List of municipalities in Ontario
