= Merlin, Ontario =

Merlin
- Unincorporated community
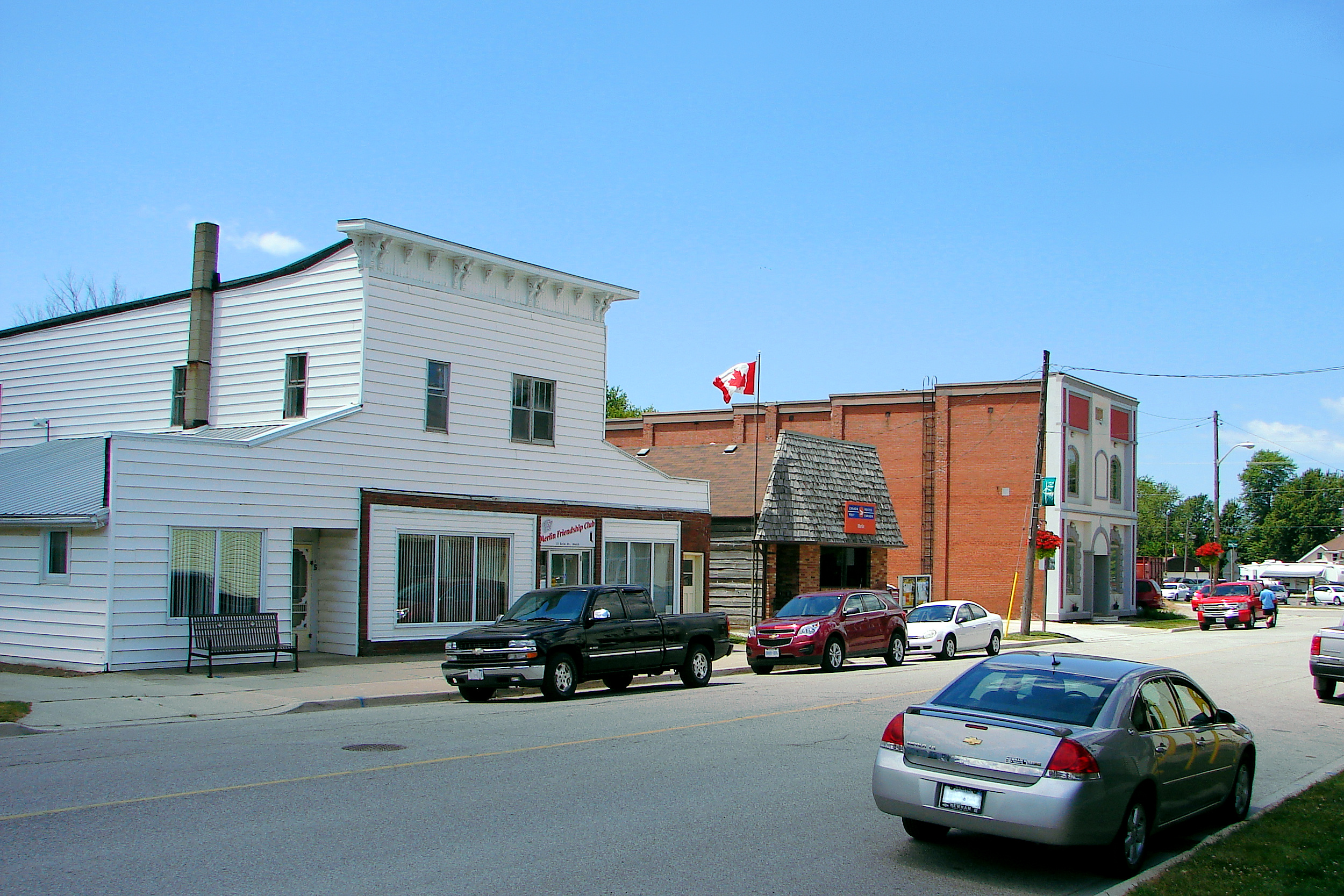

- Location within Municipality of Chatham-Kent Location within Southern Ontario
- Coordinates: 42°14′28″N 82°13′50″W
- Country: Canada
- Province: Ontario
- Municipality: Chatham-Kent
- Time zone: UTC-5 (EST)
  - Summer (DST): UTC-4 (EDT)
- Forward sortation area: N0P 1W0
- Area codes: 519 and 226
- NTS Map: 040J01
- GNBC Code: FEBSL

Merlin is a small farming community inhabited by 750 residents located in Southwestern Ontario, Canada. It lies five kilometres due north off the shores of Lake Erie in the municipality of Chatham-Kent. The town has three main streets branching out from the main intersection. Erie Street (Merlin Town Line) runs north and south through the centre of town. William Street begins at the main intersection and travels west toward the town of Tilbury while Aberdeen Street travels east from the main intersection toward the hamlet of South Buxton. Merlin is the hometown of country music singer Michelle Wright.

Originally an independent Police Village, Merlin merged into the Township of Tilbury East before becoming part of Chatham-Kent in 1998.

== Name ==
Merlin's name was bestowed upon it by Post Office Department in 1868 after a village near Edinburgh, Scotland.

== Facilities ==
Merlin had an Ontario Provincial Police detachment located at Blake and Erie Street South (now Merlin Road) but the police station was closed in the 1990s. The building is now occupied by the Chatham-Kent Fire Department.

The Kinsmen, who have a charter in Merlin, maintain the Merlin Kinsmen Park, which has a playground, splash pad, shelters and two baseball diamonds. A community centre and another baseball diamond are located on the east side of the town and are maintained by the municipality of Chatham-Kent. The Merlin Conservation area is located in the east part of the town, and has hiking trails. In 2013, the Lower Thames Valley Conservation Authority received roughly CA$25,000 to fund the creation of a new trail. The funding was announced by then Member of Parliament for Chatham-Kent—Essex, Dave Van Kestere. Merlin is also home to the Royal Canadian Legion, Branch 465.

For local amenities, Merlin has three eateries—Erie Café & Variety, The Garage, and Flame & Frostbite—A general store, and a branch of Canada Post. Merlin is also Home to the Summer's Gold Honey Company, Chatham-Kent's only CFIA registered Honey packing facility. Summer's Gold Honey Company offers both wholesale and retail honey and hive products including but not limited to Honey, beeswax, candles, soap and lip balm. Tours of the facility are available upon advance request.

There is a reputedly haunted house in Merlin. The residence is featured in a yearly local "Ghost Walks of Chatham".

== Education ==
The town was once home to both a high school and elementary school. However, after enrolment fell below 100 students, Merlin District High School, located on William Street and home to the Merlin Mavericks , closed around 1980 and was subsequently torn down. Merlin Area Public School, home of the Merlin Colts, still operates at the northern edge of town, on Erie Street. The school opened in 1968 and has a present enrolment of approximately 250 students. The Merlin Library is located on Aberdeen Street, and has books, internet access, and resource sharing agreements with other public libraries throughout Chatham-Kent.

== Industries ==
The town of Merlin, and the adjacent townships of Tilbury East on its west side, and Raleigh to its east (no longer officially townships since the formation of the municipality of Chatham-Kent in 1998) maintain farming as the primary industry. A significant alteration to the local landscape started in 2007 with the construction of 44 wind turbines by Kruger Energy. The wind turbines were constructed in Denmark and are each capable of generating 2.3 megawatts (MW) (total 101.2 MW) of electricity.

Natural gas wells were once part of the area to the west, in the former Tilbury East township, with the raw gas going to a Union Gas pumping station at Port Alma. With the capping of the wells and the closing of the pumping station in the 1980s, Union Gas sold the facilities and the main pumping building is no longer in Port Alma, but some maintenance sheds and an office building still remain.
