= Chandra K. Clarke =

Canadian writer and businesswoman

- Born: 1972 (age 53–54)
- Citizenship: Canadian
- Education: Athabasca University (BA); University of North Dakota (MS)
- Occupations: Author, columnist, businesswoman
- Years active: 1990s–present
- Known for: Founder of Scribendi.com
- Notable work: Women of Space: Cool Careers on the Final Frontier
- Awards: Interactive Media Awards (2009); International Business Award (2010); W100 (multiple years)

Chandra K. Clarke is a Canadian author, columnist, and businesswoman.

== Career ==
Chandra Clarke began her career as a freelance journalist, working for several small weeklies and community newspapers in Southwestern Ontario, specializing in municipal affairs and agribusiness reporting, while completing a Bachelor of Arts degree at Athabasca University. In 1997, she founded Scribendi.com, an editorial services company located in Chatham-Kent, Ontario that employs 200 people.

Clarke is involved with several Canadian space organizations, including the Canadian Space Society, the Royal Astronomical Society of Canada and Mars Society Canada. She received her Master of Science in space studies in 2003 from the University of North Dakota. She is a subject in the book Women of Space: Cool Careers on the Final Frontier (ISBN 1-894959-03-5). Her website to promote citizen science projects was a 2013 Webby Honoree.

She writes a weekly humour column published in several publications. Formerly known as In My Humble Opinion, it is now simply published under her name. The column covers topics including family, parenthood, and modern life, as well as the latest science and technology news.

Clarke also presents at conferences and panels on technology issues and women in business.

== Awards and honors ==
In 2009, Scribendi won Best in Class at the Interactive Media Awards, and was a finalist for Best Canadian Entrepreneur, Best Overall Company of the Year, and Most Innovative Company of the Year at the Stevie Awards for Women in Business, at ceremonies held in New York. In 2010, Scribendi.com won an International Business Award for Best Writing/Web Content, other finalists included Accenture. In 2010 she was an Enterprising Woman of the Year finalist in Enterprising Women magazine,also Stiletto Woman magazine included her on its "top 25" list. In 2011 she was awarded the Woman Exporter Year award by the Organization of Women in International Trade Toronto chapter.

In 2010, 2011, and 2012, she was listed on Profit magazine's W100, an annual ranking of Canada's top 100 women entrepreneurs.
