= John B. Lee =

Canadian author and poet (born 1951)

- Born: John Busteed Lee; 1951 (age 74–75); Highgate, Ontario, Canada
- Occupations: Author, poet

John Busteed Lee (born 1951) is a Canadian author and poet who is Poet Laureate of Brantford, Ontario.

== Biography ==
=== Early life ===
Born in Highgate, Ontario, Lee was raised on a farm near the village of Highgate. He went to Ridgetown District High School, where he wrote some of his earliest poems and has been named to the RDHS Hall of Excellence along with other distinguished alumni. He attended the University of Western Ontario where he received an Honours B.A. in English, and a BEd and M.A.T. in English. In 2010 he was received the UWO Alumni Award of Merit for Professional Achievement in recognition for his career as a poet/author/editor/performer/mentor.

=== Career ===
Lee is the author of thirty-seven published books and ten published chapbooks and he is the editor of nearly ten published anthologies. A popular performer of children's poems and songs, he has been a writer-in-residence at the University of Windsor, Kitchener Public Library, and Hillfield Strathallen private school. Lee has also been a visiting professor at University of Western Ontario, University of Windsor, Canador College, and a guest speaker at the University of the Witwatersrand in South Africa, and many universities throughout Canada and the United States. In 2005 John B. Lee was named Poet Laureate of the City of Brantford in perpetuity. He was named Member of the President's Circle of McMaster University and his personal collection of Canadian Poetry was donated to the City Library where it is available for circulation under the title "The Poet Laureate Collection".

Lee is the recipient of the following awards:

- Twice Winner of The People's Poetry Award;
- Twice recipient of the Canadian Literary Award (CBC Radio);
- Twice Winner of the Eric Hill Award of Excellence in Poetry (2004 and 2005); and
- Recipient of over 70 prestigious international awards for poetry.
- Appointed Poet Laureate of the City of Brantford in perpetuity in 2005
- Appointed Poet Laureate of Norfolk County, 2010–2014

He is also an honorary life member of the following associations:

- Canadian Poetry Association;
- The Ontario Poetry Society.

== Publications ==
- Poems Only A Dog Could Love, Applegarth Follies, 1976
- Love Among the Tombstones, Dogwood Press, 1980
- Fossils of the Twentieth Century, Vesta Publications, 1983
- Hired Hands, Brick Books, 1986 (Runner-up for the People's Poetry Award)
- Small Worlds, Vesta Publications, 1986
- Rediscovered Sheep, Brick Books, 1989
- The Bad Philosophy of Good Cows, Black Moss Press, 1989
- The Pig Dance Dreams, Black Moss Press, 1991 (Winner of the People's Poetry Award)
- The Hockey Player Sonnets, Penumbra Press, 1991
- When Shaving Seems Like Suicide, Goose Lane Editions, 1991
- Variations on Herb, Brick Books, 1993 (winner of the People's Poetry Award)
- The Art of Walking Backwards, Black Moss Press, 1993
- All the Cats Are Gone, Penumbra Press, 1993
- These Are the Days of Dogs and Horses, Black Moss Press, 1994
- The Beatles Landed Laughing in New York, Black Moss Press, 1995
- Tongues of the Children, Black Moss Press, 1996 (winner of the Tilden Award for poetry, 1995)
- Never Hand Me Anything if I Am Walking or Standing, Black Moss Press, 1997
- Soldier's Heart, Black Moss Press, 1998
- Stella's Journey, Black Moss Press, 1999
- Don't Be So Persnickety: The Runaway Sneezing Poems, Songs and Riddles, of John B. Lee, Black Moss Press, 2000
- The Half-Way Tree: Poems Selected and New, Black Moss Press, 2001
- In the Terrible Weather of Guns, Mansfield Press, 2002
- Totally Unused Heart, Black Moss Press, 2003
- Poems for the Pornographer's Daughter, Black Moss Press, 2005
- Godspeed, Black Moss Press, 2006
- But Where Were the Horses of Evening, Serengeti Press, 2007
- The Place That We Keep After Leaving, Black Moss Press, 2008
- "Island on the Wind-Breathed Edge of the Sea", Hidden Brook Press, 2009
- "Being Human" Sunbun Press, 2010
- "Dressed in Dead Uncles", Black Moss Press, 2010
- "Sweet Cuba: Cuban poetry in Spanish and English translation" Translations by John B. Lee and Manuel de Leon, Hidden Brook Press, 2010
- "In the Muddy Shoes of Morning," Hidden Brook Press, 2010
- "Let Us Be Silent Here," Sanbun Publishing, 2012
- You Can Always Eat the Dogs: The Hockeyness of Ordinary Men, Black Moss Press, 2012

"In This We Hear the Light," Hidden Brook Press, 2014 "Burning My Father," Black Moss Press, 2014

== Chapbooks Broadsides and flyers ==
- Broken Glass, League of Canadian Poets, 1983 (poetry flyer)
- To Kill a White Dog, Brick Books, 1982 (chapbook)
- Broadside HMS Press (Toronto)
- The Day Jane Fonda Came to Guelph, Plowman Press, 1989 (chapbook)
- In a Language with No Word for Horses, Above/Ground Press, 1997
- The Echo of Your Words Has Reached Me, Mekler and Deahl, 1998 (chapbook)
- An Almost Silent Drumming: The South Africa Poems, Cranberry Tree Press, 2001
- Though Their Joined Hearts Drummed Like Larks, Passion Among the Cacti Press, 2004
- Thirty-Three Thousand Shades of Green, Leaf Press, fall 2004
- The Bright Red Apples of the Dead, Pooka Press, 2004
- "One Leaf in the Breath of the World", The Ontario Poetry Society, 2009
- "Let Light Try All the Doors," Rubicon Press, 2009

== Non-fiction ==
- What's in a Name?, Dogwood Press, 1994, 1998 (essay in chapbook form)
- Head Heart Hands Health: A History of 4-H in Ontario, Comri Productions, 1995 (history)
- Building Bicycles in the Dark: A Practical Guide to Writing, Black Moss Press, 2001
- The Farm on the Hill He Calls Home: A Memoir, Black Moss Press, 2004
- Left Hand Horses: a meditation on Influence and the imagination, Black Moss Press, 2007
- King Joe: A Matter of Treason—The Life and Times of Joseph Willcocks, Heronwood Productions, 2010

== Editor ==
- "That Sign of Perfection: From Bandy Legs to Beer Legs – Poems and Stories on the Game of Hockey", Black Moss Press, 1995 (edited by John B. Lee)
- "Losers First: Poems and Stories on Game and Sport", Black Moss Press, 1999 (edited by John B. Lee)
- "I Want to Be the Poet of Your Kneecaps: Poems of Quirky Romance", Black Moss Press, 1999 (edited by John B. Lee)
- "Henry's Creature: Poems and Stories on the Automobile", Black Moss Press, 2000 (edited by Roger Bell and John B. Lee)
- "Following the Plough: Recovering the Rural – Poems and Stories on the Land", Black Moss Press, 2000 (edited by John B. Lee)
- "Smaller Than God: Words of Spiritual Longing", Black Moss Press, 2001 (edited by Brother Paul Quenon and John B. Lee)
- "Body Language: A Head-to-Toe Anthology", Black Moss Press, 2003
- Bonjour Burgundy: writing from La Roche D'Hys, Mosaic Press, 2007
- Under the Weight of Heaven: writing from Gethsemani, Black Moss Press, 2008
- Tough Times:when the money doesn't love us, Black Moss Press, 2010
- "Sweet Cuba: The Building of a poetic tradition 1608–1958," co-translated in Spanish with English translations by John B. Lee and Manuel Leon, Hidden Brook Press, 2011
- "An Unfinished War: poetry and prose on the War of 1812," Black Moss Press, 2012

"Window Fishing: the Night We Caught Beatlemania," Hidden Brook Press, 2014
