= Mitchell's Bay, Ontario =

Mitchell's Bay
- Unincorporated community
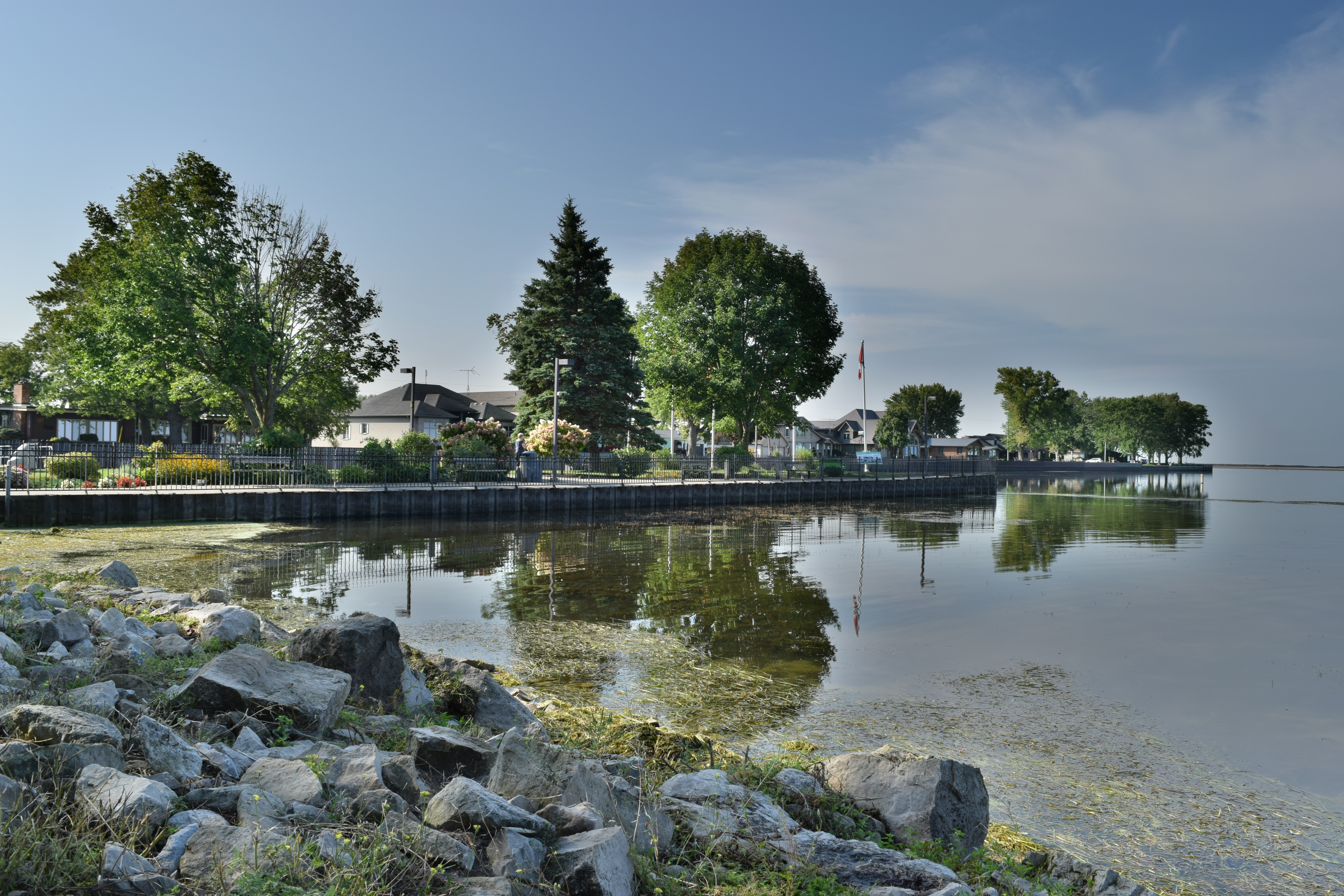
- Mitchell's Bay Wharf in September 2026

- Location of Mitchell's Bay in Chatham-Kent Mitchell's Bay (Southern Ontario)
- Coordinates: 42°28′21.786″N 82°24′20.984″W
- Country: Canada
- Province: Ontario
- Municipality: Chatham-Kent
- Time zone: UTC-5 (EST)
  - Summer (DST): UTC-4 (EDT)
- Postal codes: 1L0
- Area code(s): 519, 226, 548

Mitchell's Bay is an unincorporated community in the Municipality of Chatham-Kent, Ontario located on the eastern shore of Lake St. Clair and in the former Township of Dover.

== Etymology ==
Mitchell's Bay is named after Robert Mitchell, a prominent settler who arrived in the area sometime in the early 1800s. A record from 1846 shows Mitchell served as district Councillor before going on to serve on the Township of Dover's first municipal council in 1850.

== History ==
European settlement of the Township of Dover began in the early 1800s, and the area was settled principally by families descended from the north of Ireland. Early on, Mitchell's Bay became well known for fishing and duck hunting, for which the marsh areas along the lake were well suited. This reputation attracted further settlement. In 1849, a sportsman's camp and boat docks were established here, and the Mitchell's Bay Yachting Club dredged a section of the waterfront to provide boat wells and cottages for its members. In 1850, self-government came to the area as Dover Township was incorporated.

Commercial fishing was Mitchell's Bay's primary industry throughout most of its history, with pickerel and perch among the main species harvested. Although hard work, the industry provided a good livelihood for many local families. This more-than-century-long practice of commercial fishing in Mitchell's Bay began to come to a close in 1970, when the Canadian and American governments closed the fishery in response to the discovery of high levels of mercury contamination in its fish, for which Dow Chemical's Sarnia Chlor-Alkali Plant, further up the watershed, was responsible.

Mercury cell plants had been operated at this facility since 1949, and toxic mercury waste was regularly discharged into the St. Clair River. Over time, this mercury spread around the watershed, entered the food chain and accumulated in fish and other aquatic organisms. The plant only began monitoring this mercury discharge in July 1969, measuring average daily losses of 70 pounds of mercury at that time. Prior to that, it was estimated that between 1950 and 1969, an average of 30 pounds was lost per day. Ten years after it was closed in 1970, the commercial fishery was reopened under strict restrictions, as mercury levels in the fish had declined to safe levels. While some fishers resumed their practice, by 1995 all had given up, and the industry was effectively dead.

In 1998, Mitchell's Bay, as part of Dover Township, was amalgamated into the new Municipality of Chatham-Kent.

In 2018, a plaque and sakura tree were installed in Mitchell's Bay park as part of a broader initiative in Chatham-Kent to commemorate the Japanese Canadians who were forcefully migrated and interned in Kent County during the Second World War.
