= Ron Ritchie =

Canadian politician (1918–2007)

Ronald Stuart Ritchie
- Ron Ritchie at the ceremony at which he was inducted to the Order of Canada, June 2005

Member of Parliament for York East
- In office May 22, 1979 – February 18, 1980
- Preceded by: David Collenette
- Succeeded by: David Collenette

Personal details
- Born: July 4, 1918 Charing Cross, Ontario
- Died: August 18, 2007 (aged 89)
- Party: Progressive Conservative Party of Canada
- Profession: Economist, business leader, public servant, writer, politician

Ronald Stuart Ritchie, CM (July 4, 1918 - August 18, 2007) was a Canadian economist, business leader, public servant, writer, and politician. He is best known for his role in founding the Institute for Research on Public Policy, but also served as a member of the House of Commons of Canada during the Joe Clark government.

== Early life ==
Ritchie was born July 4, 1918, in Charing Cross, Ontario. He graduated from the Central Collegiate High School in London, Ontario, before earning a Bachelor of Arts in Economics and Political Science from the University of Western Ontario. He then earned a Master of Arts from Queen's University.

Ritchie served on the Canadian Wartime Prices and Trade Board during the Second World War. In 1947, he joined Imperial Oil, where he remained into the 1970s, eventually reaching the level of senior vice president and member of the board of directors. During his time with Imperial Oil, he continued to publish papers on subjects ranging from petroleum economics to military policy and higher education.

From 1960 until 1962, he was the executive director of the Royal Commission on Government Organization (the Glassco Commission), which recommended a decentralized organizational model for the federal government. He was on the University of Guelph board of governors from 1965 until 1971, and chair for the last three years.

== The Institute for Research on Public Policy ==
In his first Speech from the Throne, Pierre Trudeau committed to conducting a feasibility study into establishing a new public affairs research institute in Canada. He asked Ritchie to prepare a report on the subject.

=== The Ritchie Report ===
Ritchie's report, delivered in December 1969 and published in 1971, called for the creation of such an institute. He recommended that the body be autonomous from the government, and suggested that the Prime Minister "ask a small number of distinguished citizens... to seek incorporation of the proposed institute under the Canada Corporations Act." He further proposed a $10 million endowment from the federal government, supplemented by funds from the provincial governments and private sector, to serve as a source of base revenue for the institute, with half of its annual revenue coming from government contracts, grants from foundations and corporations, and sale of publications. Finally, he emphasized that the target audience for the institute's research should be politicians and public servants rather than academics.

Trudeau sat on the report for several years, during which time Ritchie said that he was considering acting on it himself until he was dissuaded by Clerk of the Privy Council Gordon Robertson, who assured him that the report was receiving consideration. Trudeau later authorized the body's creation and asked Ritchie to lead the group of "distinguished citizens" who would apply for incorporation. The Institute for Research on Public Policy was established.

=== Chair of the Board of Directors ===
Ritchie selected J.V. Clyne (a Vancouver businessman), Louis Armand Desrochers (an Edmonton lawyer), Louis Lorrain (a Montreal labour organizer), Joseph MacNeil (Bishop of Saint John, New Brunswick), former Ontario premier John Robarts, and journalist (and later Governor General) Jeanne Sauvé as members. Ritchie was elected chair, and took an active role in fundraising for the institute (the federal government had agreed to the $10 million endowment, but only on a matching basis). Ritchie later remarked that he did so "wearing [his] Imperial Oil hat, because that carried more weight in some of the circles where money was to be had." He also participated in selecting the site for the institute's headquarters (Montreal, to the consternation of the prairie premiers) and in hiring the first president, University of Calgary president Fred Carrothers, who took office in June 1974. By that time, however, Ritchie had decided to leave the institute and enter politics.

== Political career ==
Ritchie ran in the 1974 election as the Progressive Conative candidate in the riding of Algoma, finishing third of four candidates (Liberal Maurice Foster took more than half the vote, while New Democrat Hughene MacDonald finished a hundred votes ahead of Ritchie). He was elected in the 1979 federal election from a field of seven candidates in York East, unseating incumbent Liberal David Collenette.

During his time in the House of Commons of Canada, Ritchie was Parliamentary Secretary to Minister of Finance John Crosbie. He also ed on the standing committees on Finance, Trade, and Economic Affairs and on Public Accounts.

He was defeated by Collenette in the 1980 election. Besides a failed attempt to win the Progressive Conative nomination in Broadview—Greenwood for a 1982 by-election, his political career was over.

== Later life ==
After leaving politics, Ritchie was chief executive officer of the Canadian Depository for Securities from 1983 until 1986 and as a member of the Atlantic Council of Canada during the 1980s. He also was a member of the Canadian Ditchley Foundation. He remained active in the Club of Rome (he had co-founded its Canadian association in 1973—and was its chair from 1980 until 1983—after a long history with the international body).

In 1990, Ritchie published Canadian Pacific's Montreal Lakeshore Commuter Service, Volume One (ISBN 0919487335), a history of commuter trains used on Montreal.

In 2002 he received the first Roland Lutes Memorial Award for extraordinary service to the Institute for Research on Public Policy.

He was admitted as a member of the Order of Canada on June 10, 2005.

Ritchie died on August 18, 2007.

== Selected writings ==
- Oil in World affairs. Toronto, 1951.
- NATO, the Economics of an Alliance, Toronto, Ontario: Ryerson Press, 1956.
- Problems of a Defence Policy for Canada. International Journal, Vol. XIV, No. 3 (Summer, 1959)
- Viewpoint: The Need for Continuing Education, Canadian Personnel & Industrial Relations Journal. August, 1961.
- An Institute for Research on Public Policy. Toronto: Information Canada, 1971.
- Public Policies Affecting Petroleum Development in Canada, Canadian Journal of Economics, 1(1), Winter 1975, pp. 66–75
- Oil Self-Sufficiency for Canada?, Canadian Journal of Economics, 6(3), Summer 1980, pp. 463–471.
- Canadian Pacific's Montreal Lakeshore Commuter Service, Volume One, British Railway Modellers of North America, 1990, (ISBN 0919487335)
