= Ride CK =

Bus transportation for Chatham-Kent, Ontario

- Founded: 1998
- Headquarters: Chatham, Ontario, Canada
- Service area: Chatham-Kent, Ontario
- Service type: Urban area, interurban
- Routes: 5 urban, 3 interurban
- Operator: CitiLinx Transit
- Website: Ride CK

Ride CK (formerly known as CK Transit) provides the conventional bus transportation in Chatham-Kent, Ontario, Canada.

There are five local bus routes within the urban boundaries of the old City of Chatham. Routes 1 through 4 provide services every 30 minutes Monday through Saturday, while route 5 runs on a 45-minute basis. For rail passengers, bus route 3 stops nearest Via Rail Chatham station, at the intersection of Park Avenue West and Pine Street.

Ride CK also provides bus service to outlying communities in Chatham-Kent. In October 2007, Route A, linking Chatham, Wallaceburg and Dresden, with four trips Monday through Saturday, was introduced.

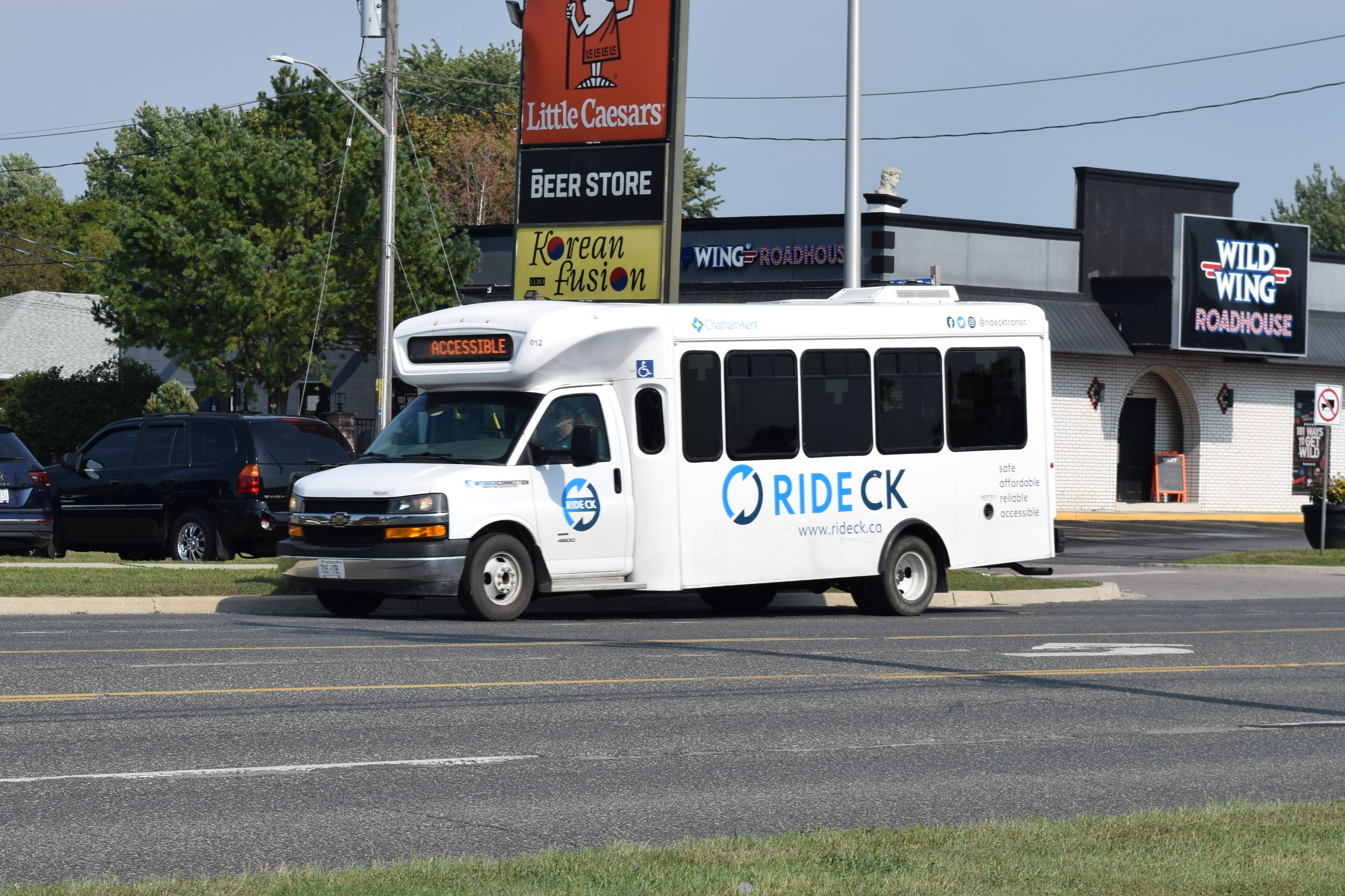
Ride CK bus on route

Interurban service was expanded to include Route D, linking Chatham to Tilbury and Wheatley in January 2009, and Route C, serving Blenheim and Ridgetown in January 2010.

All urban and inter-urban routes stop at the Downtown Transfer Terminal at 100 Wellington Street West in Chatham.

Chatham Specialized Transit Service is a personalized curb-to-curb transportation service for persons who are unable to board the Chatham Conventional public transit system.

In March 2020, Ride CK launched a pilot project in which it offers on-demand transit in the urban area. A dedicated app for this service was launched in December 2021. As of 2024, CK OnRequest is offered on evenings and Sundays in Chatham and all week in Wallaceburg.

== Urban routes ==
#	Route Description	Service
1	Northwest Chatham: St. Clair College via Grand Avenue, McNaughton Avenue, and Sheldon Avenue	Monday to Saturday: 6:15 am to 7:15 pm, every 30 minutes
2	Northeast Chatham: North Maple Mall via St. Clair Street, McHenry Road, and Grand Avenue	Monday to Saturday: 6:15 am to 7:15 pm, every 30 minutes
3	Southeast Chatham: Indian Creek Road via Sass Road, John Street, and Tweedsmuir Avenue	Monday to Saturday: 6:15 am to 7:15 pm, every 30 minutes
4	Southwest Chatham: Park Avenue via King Street, Richmond Street, and Lacroix Street	Monday to Saturday: 6:15 am to 7:15 pm, every 30 minutes
5	Round the River: both sides of the Thames River from Princess Street in the east to Bloomfield Rd in the southwest	Monday to Saturday: 6:15 am to 7:15 pm, every 45 minutes

== Inter-urban routes ==
#	Route Description	Service
A	Chatham - Wallaceburg - Dresden	Monday to Friday: 2 morning departures; 1 midday departure; 2 afternoon departures; Saturday: 2 morning departures; 2 afternoon departures
C	Chatham - Charing Cross - Blenheim - Ridgetown	Monday to Friday: 2 morning departures; 1 midday departure; 2 afternoon departures; Saturday: 2 morning departures; 2 afternoon departures
D	Chatham - Charing Cross - Cedar Springs - Dealtown - North and South Buxton - Merlin - Tilbury	Monday to Friday: 2 morning departures; 1 midday departure; 2 afternoon departures; Saturday: 2 morning departures; 2 afternoon departures

== See also ==
- Public transport in Canada
