= Tilbury, Ontario =

Tilbury
- Unincorporated community
- Business district

- Location within Municipality of Chatham-Kent Location within Southern Ontario
- Coordinates: 42°15′30″N 82°25′55″W
- Country: Canada
- Province: Ontario
- Municipality: Chatham-Kent

Government
  - Mayor: Darrin Canniff
  - Councillors - Ward 1 - West Kent: Lauren Anderson Melissa Harrigan

Area
  - Total: 5.80 km^{2} (2.24 sq mi)
- Elevation: 198 m (650 ft)

Population (2021)
  - Total: 4,687
  - Density: 1,131.1/km^{2} (2,930/sq mi)
- Time zone: UTC-5 (EST)
  - Summer (DST): UTC-4 (EDT)
- Forward sortation area: N0P 2L0
- Area codes: 519 and 226 and 548
- NTS Map: 040J08
- GNBC Code: FCWJJ
- Website: tilburyontario.com

Tilbury is a community within the municipality of Chatham-Kent, Ontario, Canada. It is located 26.5 kilometres (16.5 mi) southwest of Chatham-Kent and 57.3 kilometres (35.6 mi) east of Windsor on Highway 401.

== History ==
The nearby townships of Tilbury West and Tilbury East were named for the port of Tilbury in the English county of Essex. A settlement, called Henderson (after the local postmaster), was established with the construction of the Canada Southern Railway in 1875. The name of the post office was changed to Tilbury Centre after the adjoining townships and the community was incorporated as a village in 1887. The name changed again to Tilbury a few years later, in 1895, and incorporated as a town in 1910. Tilbury is also home to the largest antique mall in its part of Southern Ontario. Tilbury is also famous for its murals which depict part of its history. In 1998, the town was amalgamated with the City of Chatham, the township of Chatham, Blenheim, Bothwell, Camden, Dover, Dresden, Erie Beach, Erieau, Harwich, Highgate, Howard, Orford, Raleigh, Ridgetown, Romney, Thamesville, Tilbury East, Wallaceburg, Wheatley and Zone to form the municipality of Chatham-Kent. The former town hall at 17 Superior Street is now Tilbury Municipal Centre and Chatham-Kent Police station.

Tilbury's post office

== Transportation ==
Tilbury is served by Highway 401 and Ontario Highway 2.

Public transit is provided by CK Transit's interurban Route D Chatham-Tilbury-Merlin.

The closest airports are Chatham-Kent Airport and Windsor International Airport.

There are no trains servicing Tilbury directly; the closest is VIA Rail's Chatham station.

== Community ==
Tilbury is also home of the Titans of Tilbury District High School, with an attendance of around 300 students. There is also a French elementary school (École élémentaire Saint-Francis), a public elementary school (Tilbury Area Public School) as well as a Catholic elementary school (St. Joseph Catholic School with 120 students).

Along with the former townships of Tilbury East and Dover, Tilbury is a designated French language service area under Ontario's French Language Services Act. Tilbury has an arena which provides free skating in the wintertime. Tilbury also has a splash pad near Tilbury Arena and Memorial Park has a skateboard park, a tennis court, an outdoor swimming pool, and a baseball field. Near the end of June, the organizers host a Canada Day fireworks event around dusk at the park. Organizers host the Tibury Santa Claus Parade in late November or early December and the Canada Day Parade in late June. It also holds many pizza places.

== Media ==
Tilbury has a weekly newspaper, the Tilbury Times. The Tilbury Times had been publishing since 1884. It features local news, sports, and highlights. In some instances, news from Tilbury may be heard on CKSY-FM, CFCO and CKUE-FM on radio, as well as television stations CBC News Windsor CBET-DT and CHWI-DT.

== Downtown renovations ==
In 2014, sidewalks in Tilbury were replaced, and new streetlights installed. In 2017, streetlights got new types of bulbs as LEDs are used for night illumination.
