= Raglan, Chatham-Kent, Ontario =

Raglan
- Unincorporated community
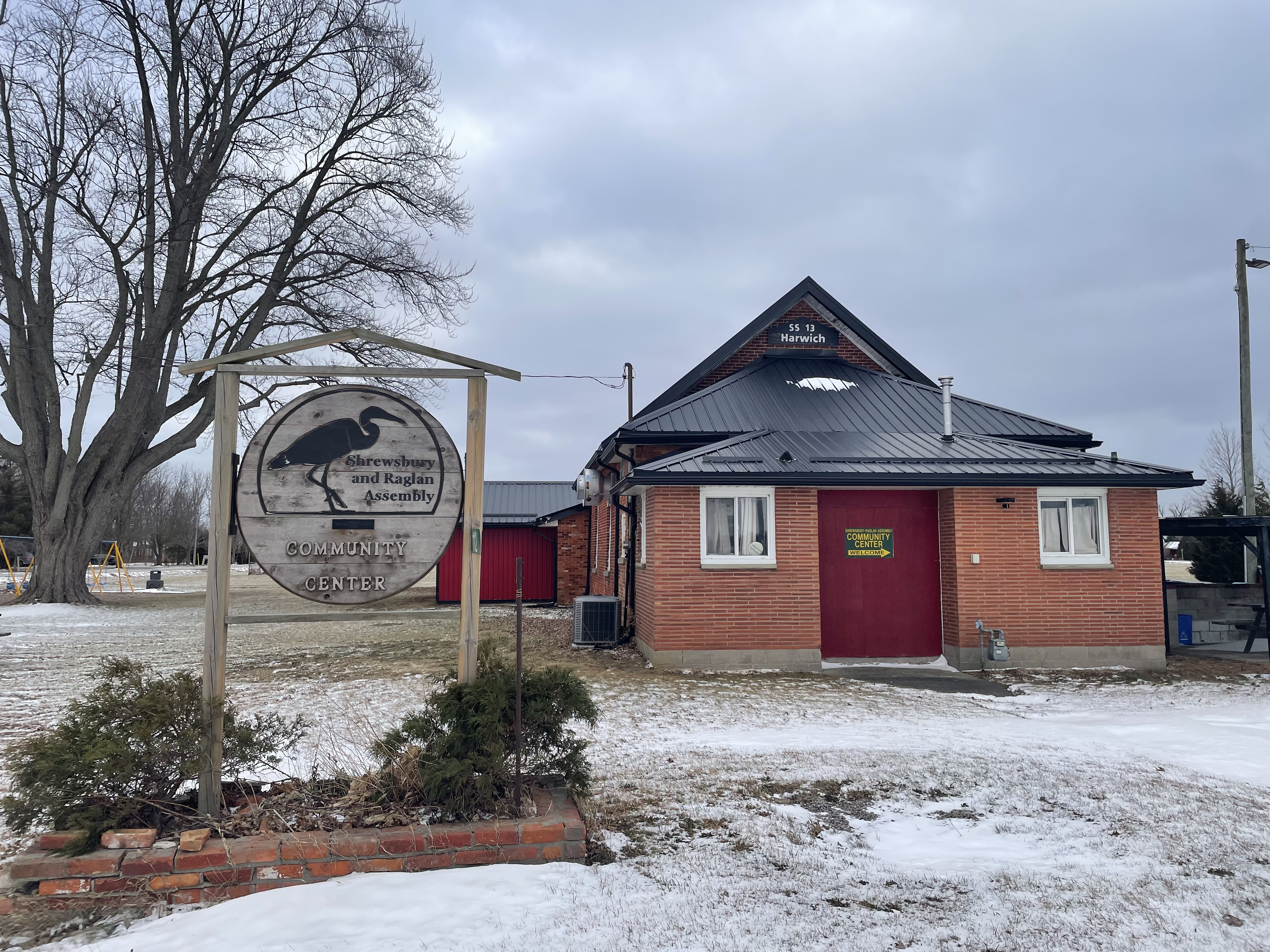
- The Shrewsbury and Raglan Community Centre in December 2025

- Location of Shrewsbury and Raglan in Chatham-Kent Shrewsbury and Raglan (Southern Ontario)
- Coordinates: 42°17′59.1504″N 81°55′28.9488″W
- Country: Canada
- Province: Ontario
- Municipality: Chatham-Kent
- Time zone: UTC-5 (EST)
  - Summer (DST): UTC-4 (EDT)
- Postal codes: 1C0
- Area code(s): 519, 226, 548

Raglan is a community in Ontario. In 1792, Governor Simcoe declared all of Rondeau Bay as "ordnance land" which reserved the waters and peninsula for naval and military purposes. Shrewsbury was surveyed as a future naval base and prospective capital of the "Western District". A channel to the lake was dredged through the bay and through the sandy islands where the present village of Erieau now stands. A long wharf was constructed along the Shrewsbury shoreline to accommodate large sailing vessels. It was to have been a port and, indeed, did have a dock in Rondeau Bay.

Rondeau Bay had a post office from 1882 to 1948. Shrewsbury's first school, School Section #13, was built on the new Scotland Line in 1860–61, by Mr. Addison Smith. It was an integrated school and its first teacher was Mrs. Emeline Shadd. However, during the 1860s Raglan was a thriving harbour and community of its own.

Because a common school could be started where there were at least 20 students, the Raglan community petitioned for its own schoolhouse, to be known as S.S. No. 13 1/2 Raglan. The original school was wood framed and built on School Street (Hunter Sideroad). When the new school was built in 1895, on the corner of School Street and New Scotland Line, the original framed schoolhouse was moved across from the Methodist Cemetery on the Eau Road. The Community Centre building in Shrewsbury is the original school from 1860. It closed in 1967 and was remodelled. (This was S.S. #13½ Raglan).

The other school in Shrewsbury, S.S. #13 Harwich was founded by a former black slave Charles Ramsey. As noted above, it opened in 1861 with Emeline Shadd as teacher. For many years, S.S. #13½ Raglan was the "whites" school while S.S. #13 Harwich was the "blacks" school. Both schools closed when Harwich-Raleigh Public School opened in Blenheim in 1967. The Shadd family had escaped from the United States and became established in the Buxton Settlement.

Shrewsbury and Raglan are closely linked historically.

Raglan may have been named in honor of Lord Raglan and his infamous role in the Charge of the Light Brigade. There is also a Raglan Castle in Wales.
