= Erie Beach, Chatham-Kent, Ontario =

Unincorporated community in Ontario, Canada

Erie Beach
- Unincorporated community
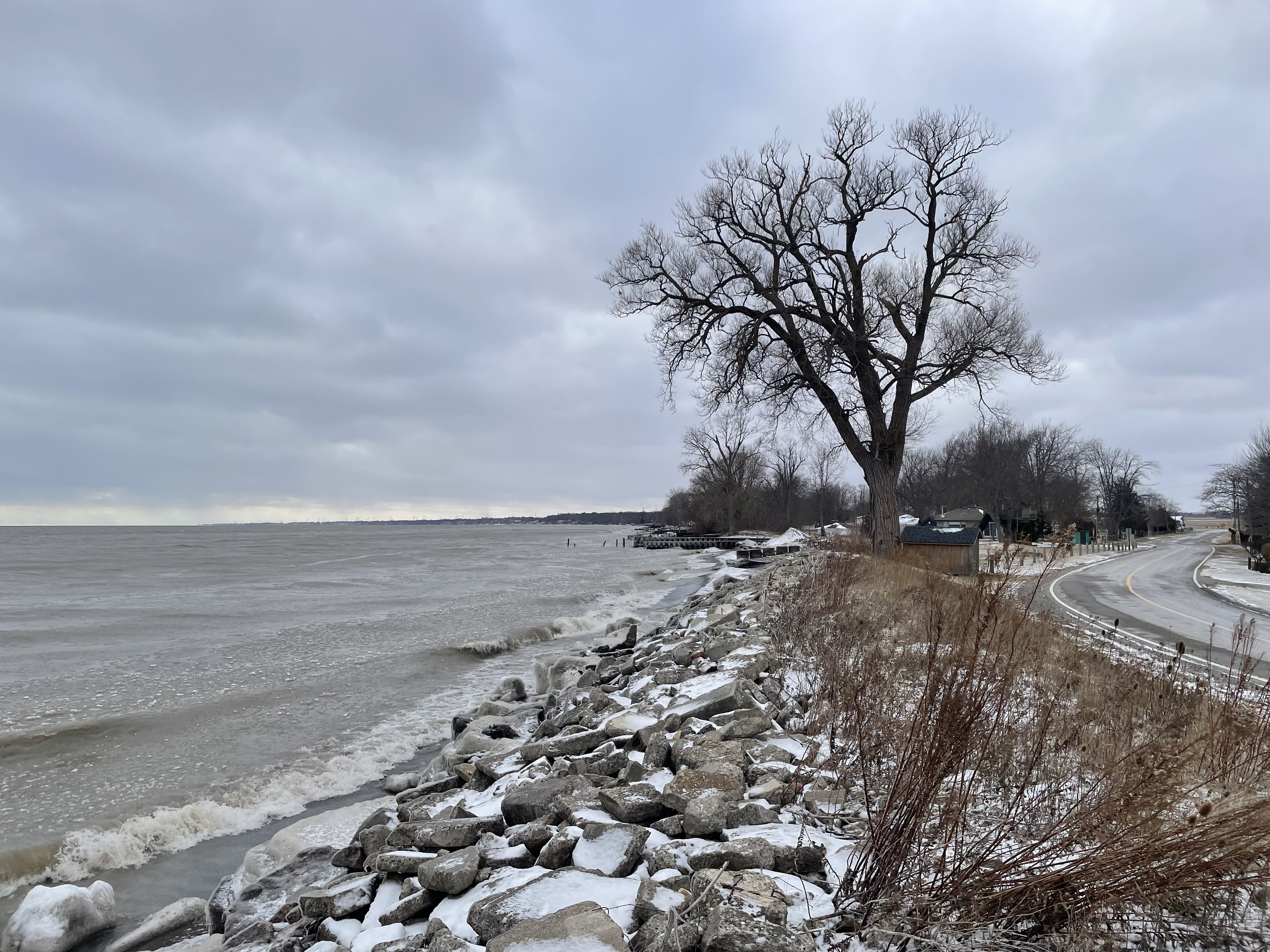
- Scene at Erie Beach's Lake Erie Lookout in December 2025

- Location of Erie Beach in Chatham-Kent Erie Beach (Southern Ontario)
- Coordinates: 42°15′56.7612″N 82°0′5.8752″W
- Country: Canada
- Province: Ontario
- Municipality: Chatham-Kent

Population (2021)
  - Total: 153
  - Density: 630.9/km^{2} (1,634/sq mi)
- Demonym: Erie Beacher
- Time zone: UTC-5 (EST)
  - Summer (DST): UTC-4 (EDT)
- Postal codes: 1C0
- Area code(s): 519, 226, 548

Erie Beach is an unincorporated community in Ontario, Canada that previously held village status. It is recognized as a designated place by Statistics Canada.

== Demographics ==
In the 2021 Census of Population conducted by Statistics Canada, Erie Beach had a population of 153 living in 78 of its 117 total private dwellings, a change of 2% from its 2016 population of 150. With a land area of 0.24 km^{2} (0.093 sq mi), it had a population density of 637.5/km^{2} (1,651.1/sq mi) in 2021.

== See also ==
- List of communities in Ontario
- List of designated places in Ontario
