= Highgate, Ontario =

Highgate
- Unincorporated community
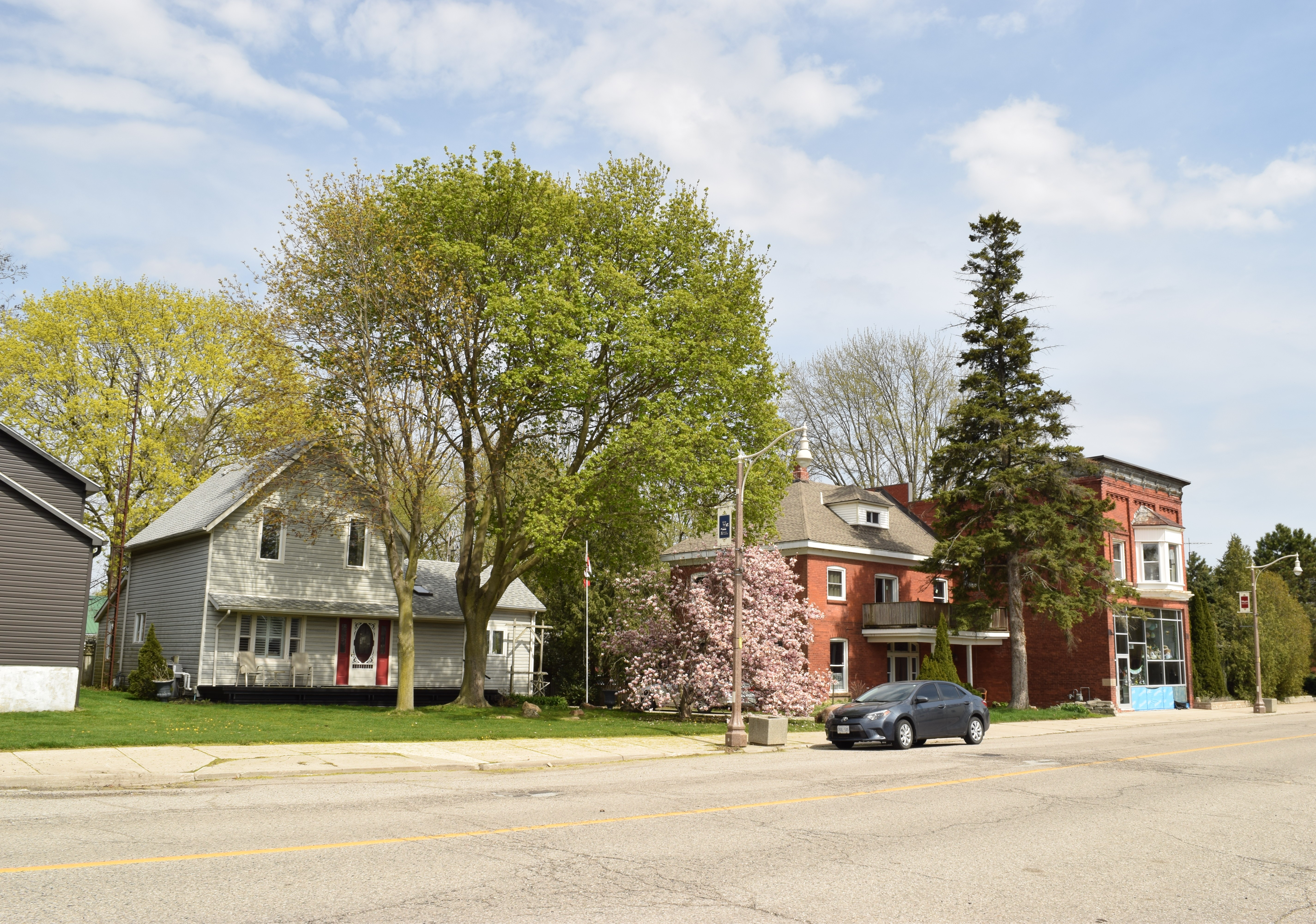
- Scene on King Street in April 2026

- Location of Highgate in Chatham-Kent Highgate (Southern Ontario)
- Coordinates: 42°30′6.588″N 81°48′57.024″W
- Country: Canada
- Province: Ontario
- Municipality: Chatham-Kent

Population (2021)
  - Total: 299
  - Density: 103.8/km^{2} (269/sq mi)
- Time zone: UTC-5 (EST)
  - Summer (DST): UTC-4 (EDT)
- Postal codes: 1T0
- Area code(s): 519, 226, 548

Highgate is an unincorporated community and former municipality in Chatham-Kent, Ontario, Canada. It is recognized as a designated place by Statistics Canada.

== History ==
Highgate was located along a branch of the former Canada Southern Railway. In 1880, Highgate had a school, two churches, a saw mill, an oatmeal and flouring mill, and a population of approximately 300.

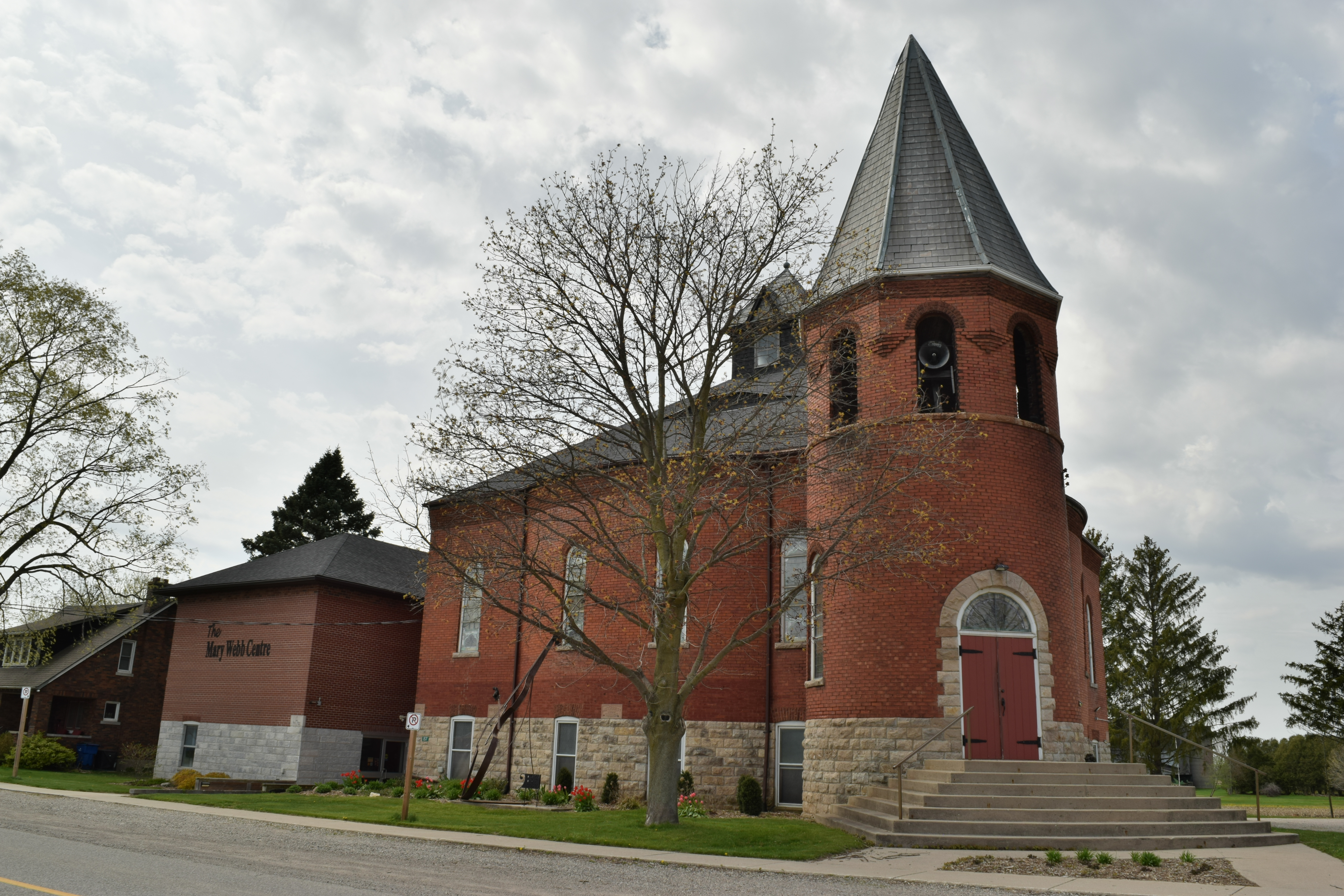
The Mary Webb Centre - Highgate

== Demographics ==
In the 2021 Census of Population conducted by Statistics Canada, Highgate had a population of 299 living in 145 of its 153 total private dwellings, a change of −11.5% from its 2016 population of 338. With a land area of 2.88 km^{2} (1.11 sq mi), it had a population density of 103.8/km^{2} (268.9/sq mi) in 2021.

== See also ==
- List of communities in Ontario
- List of designated places in Ontario
