= Chatham, Ontario =

Chatham
- Unincorporated community
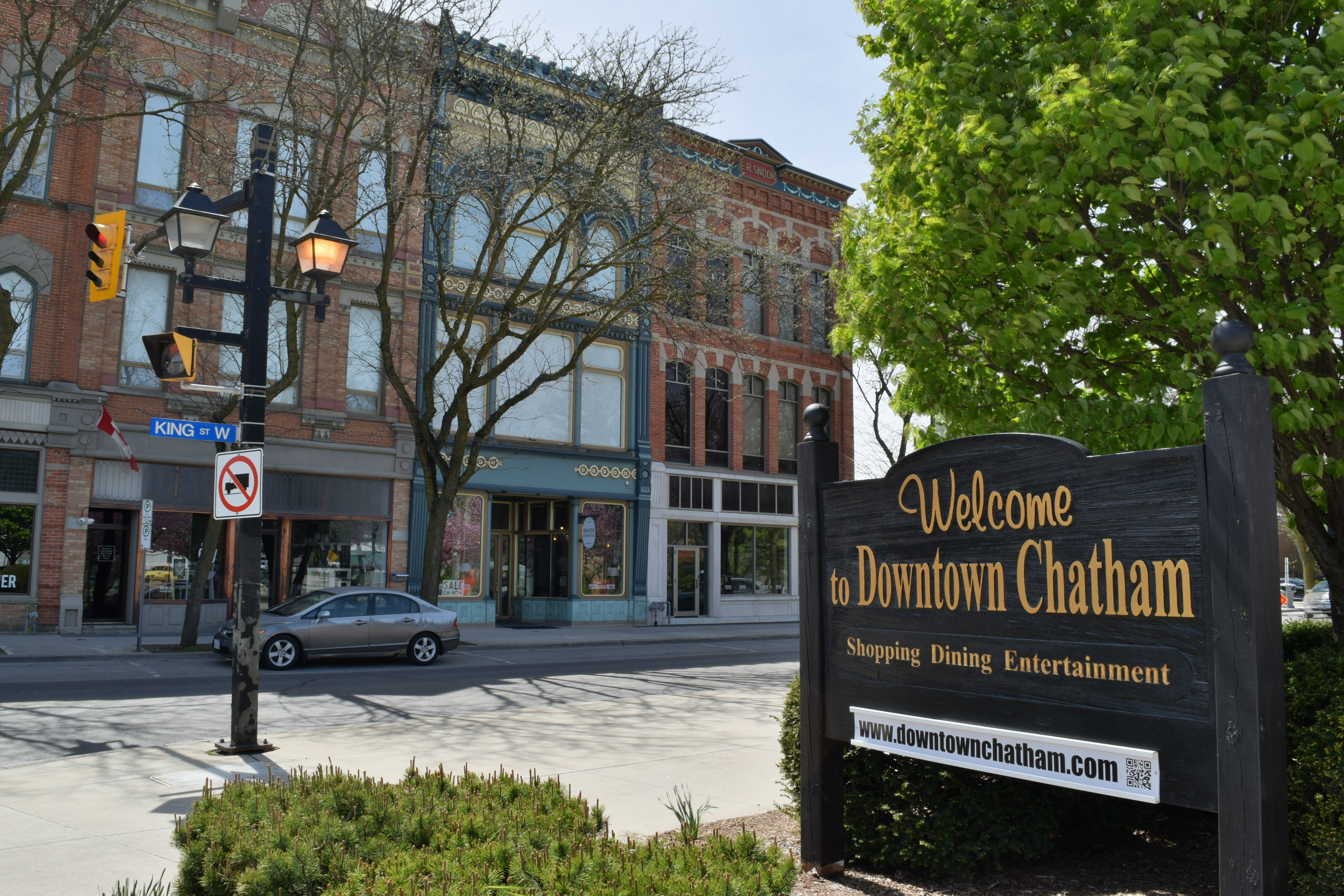
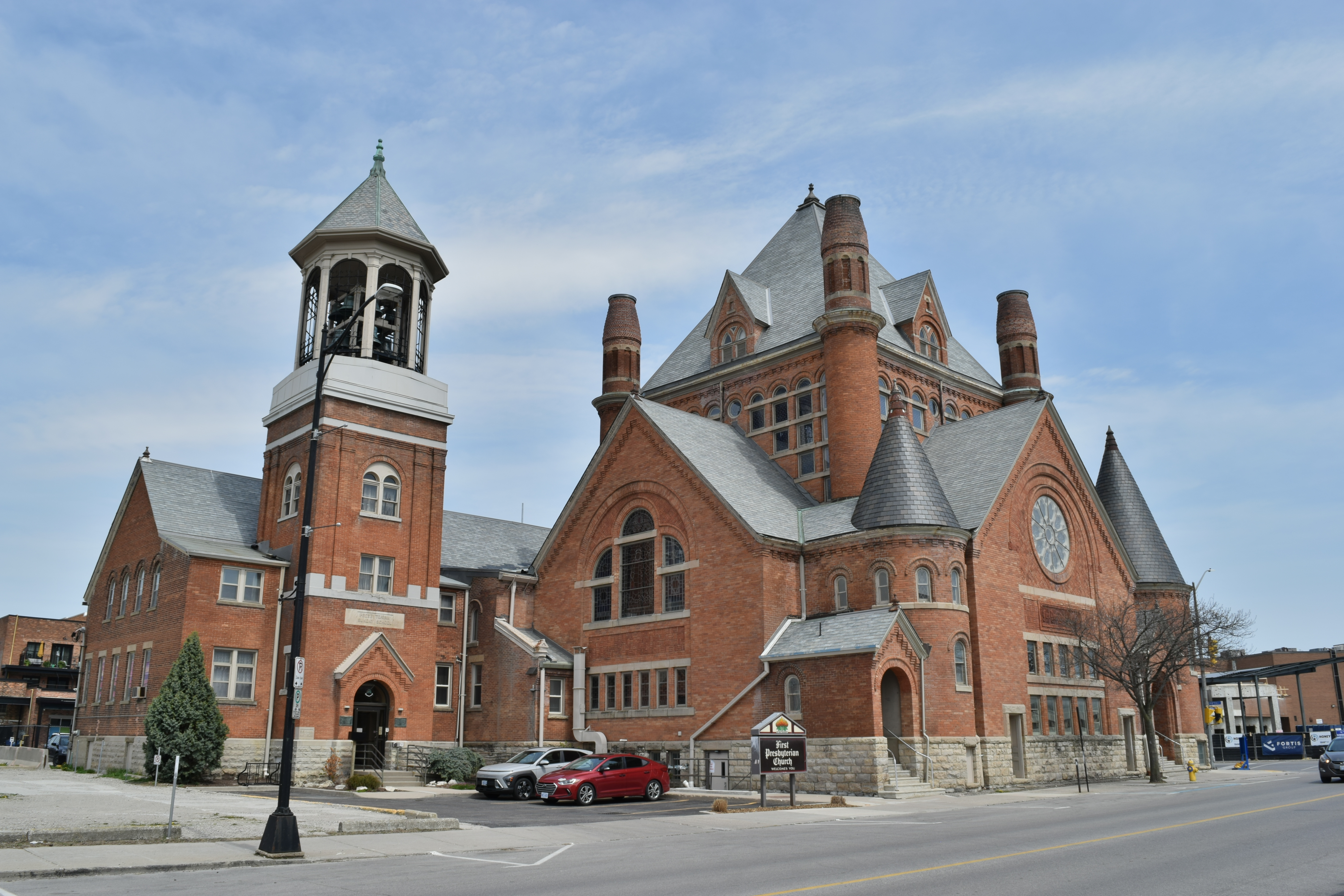
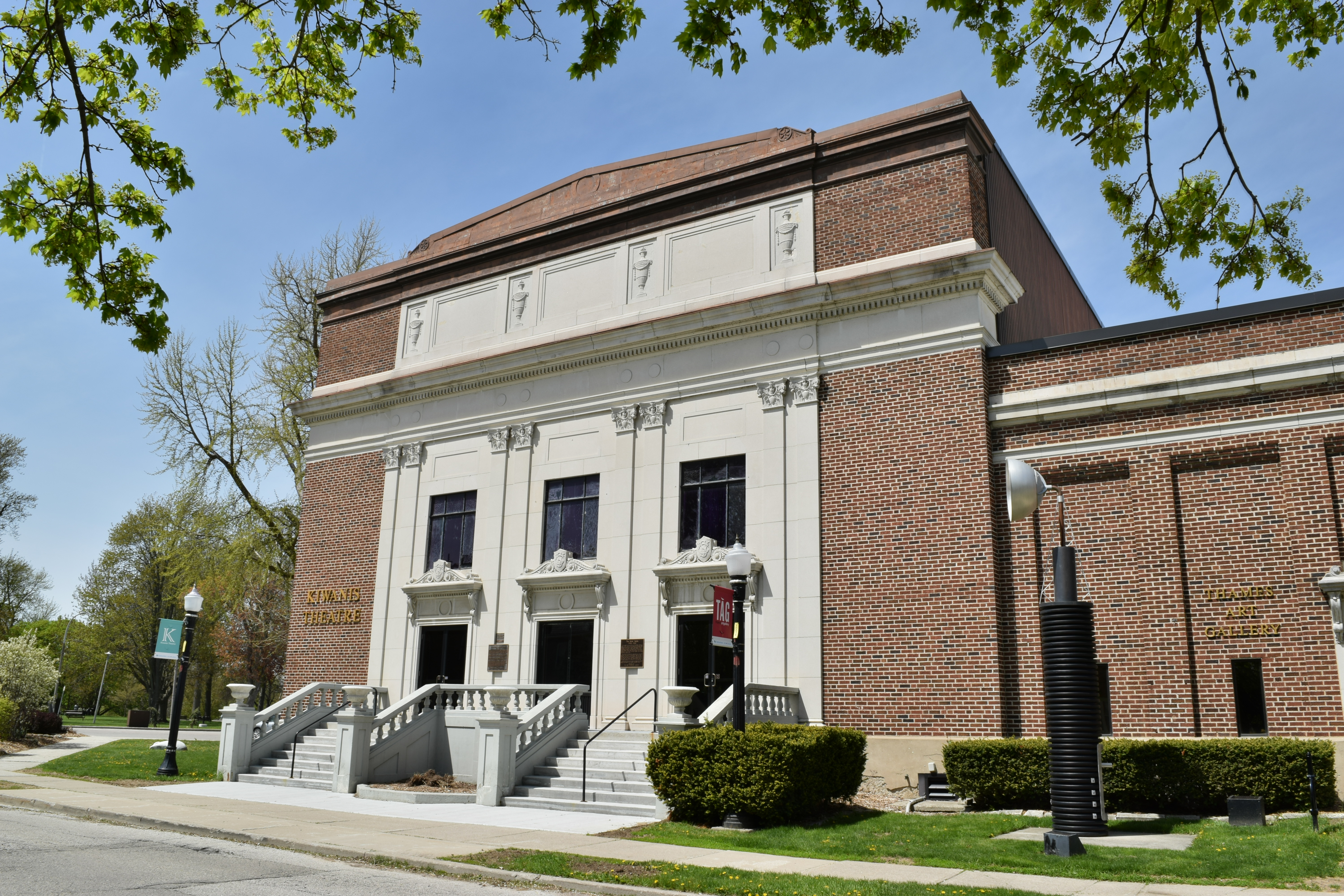
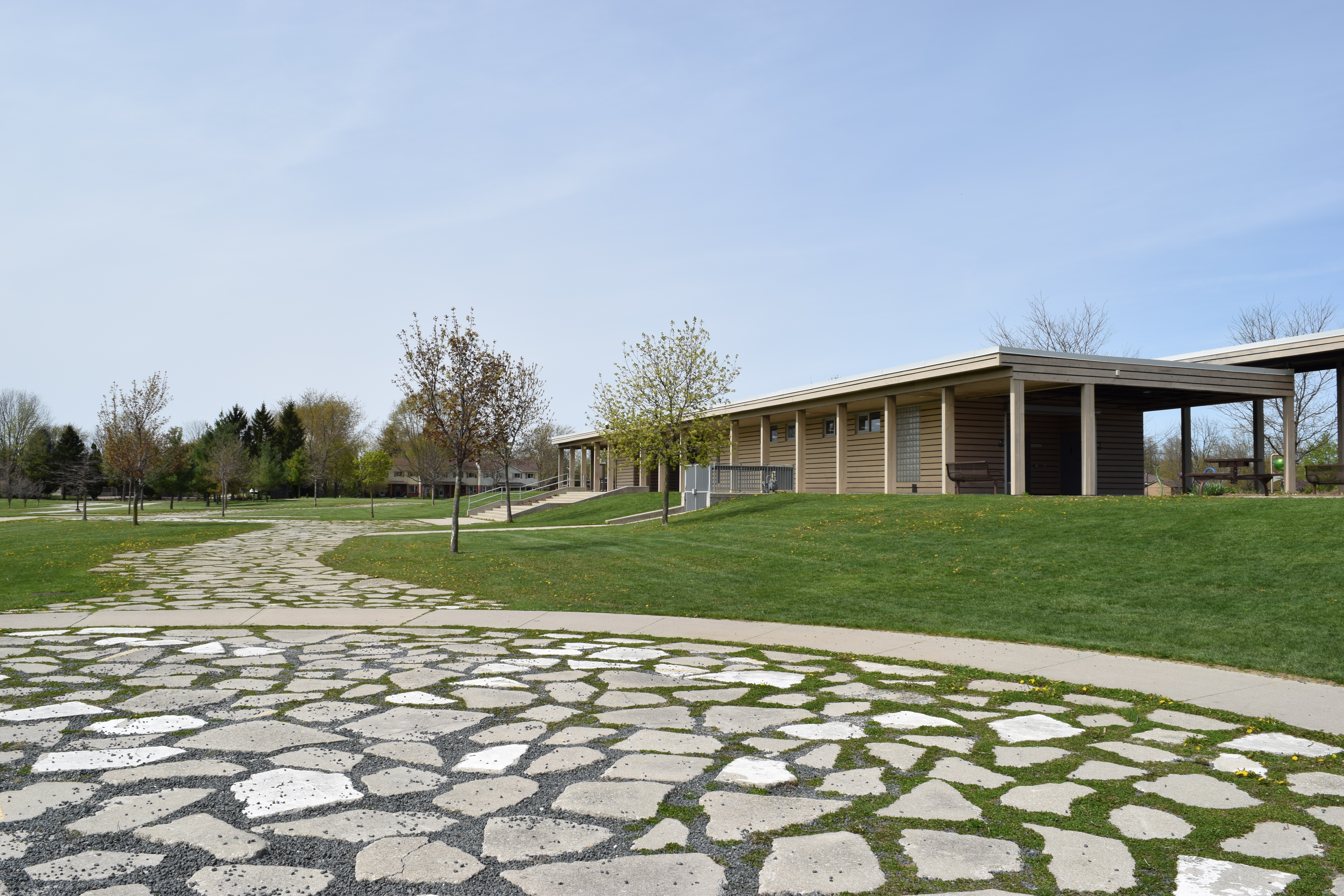
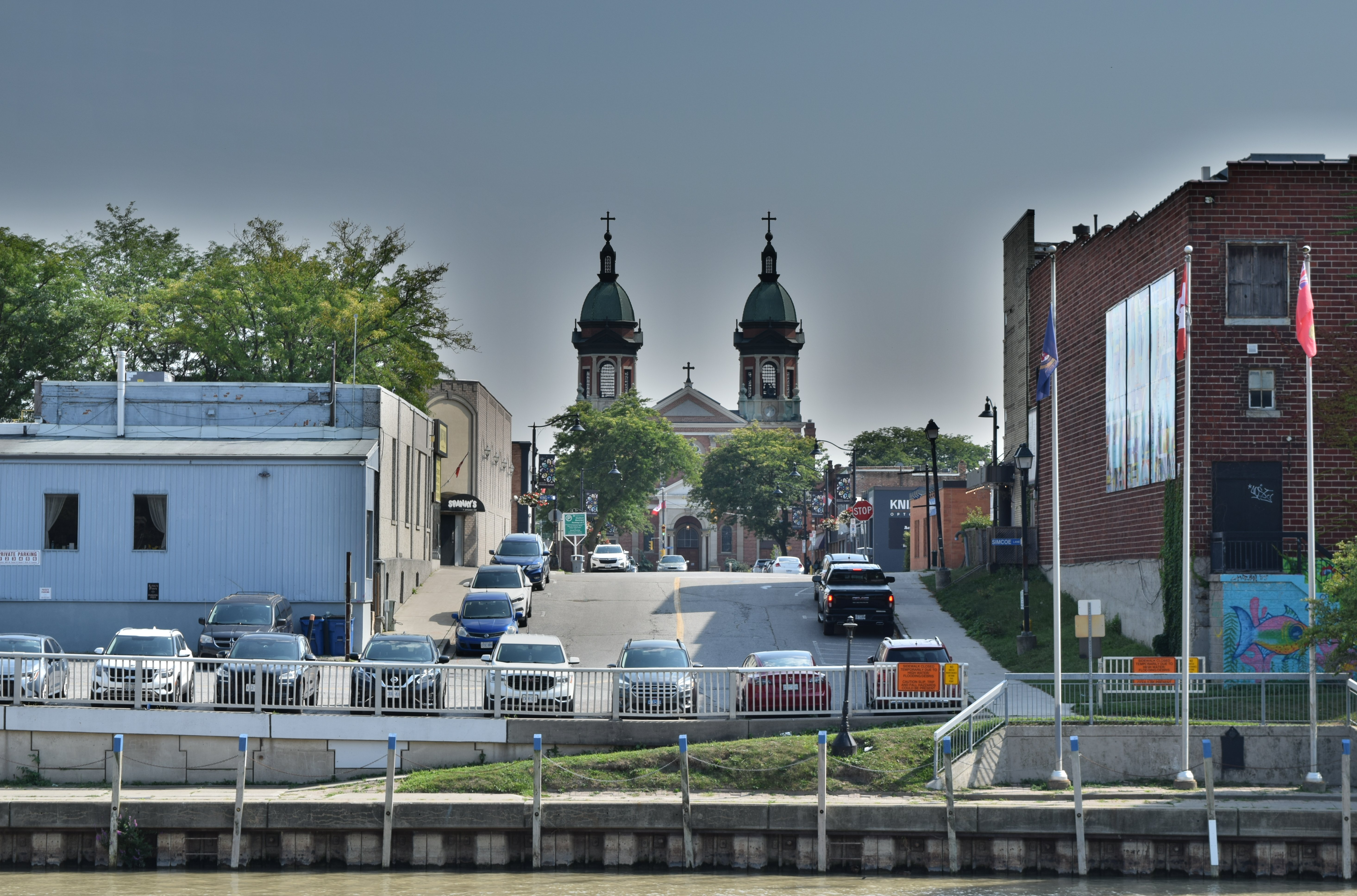
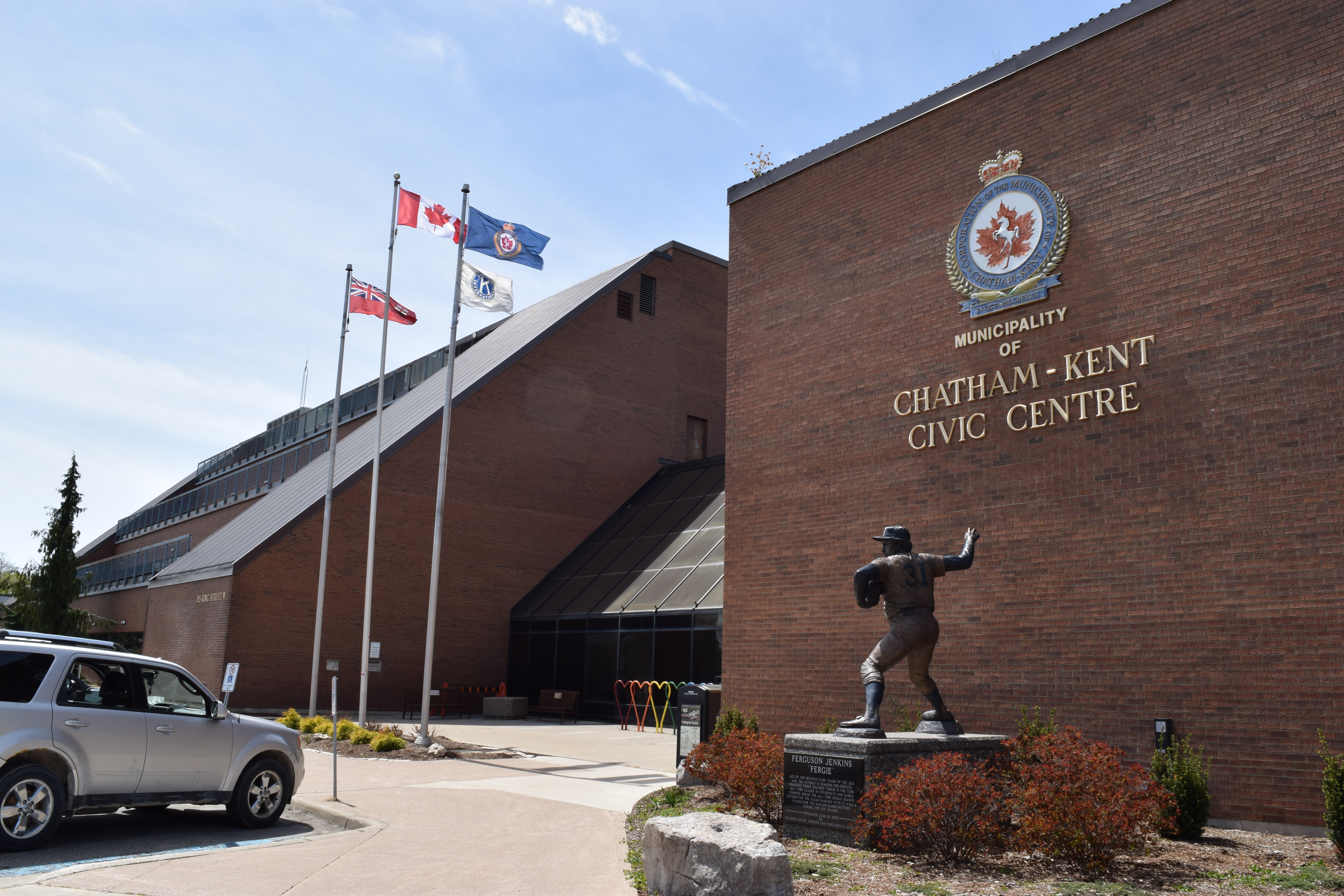
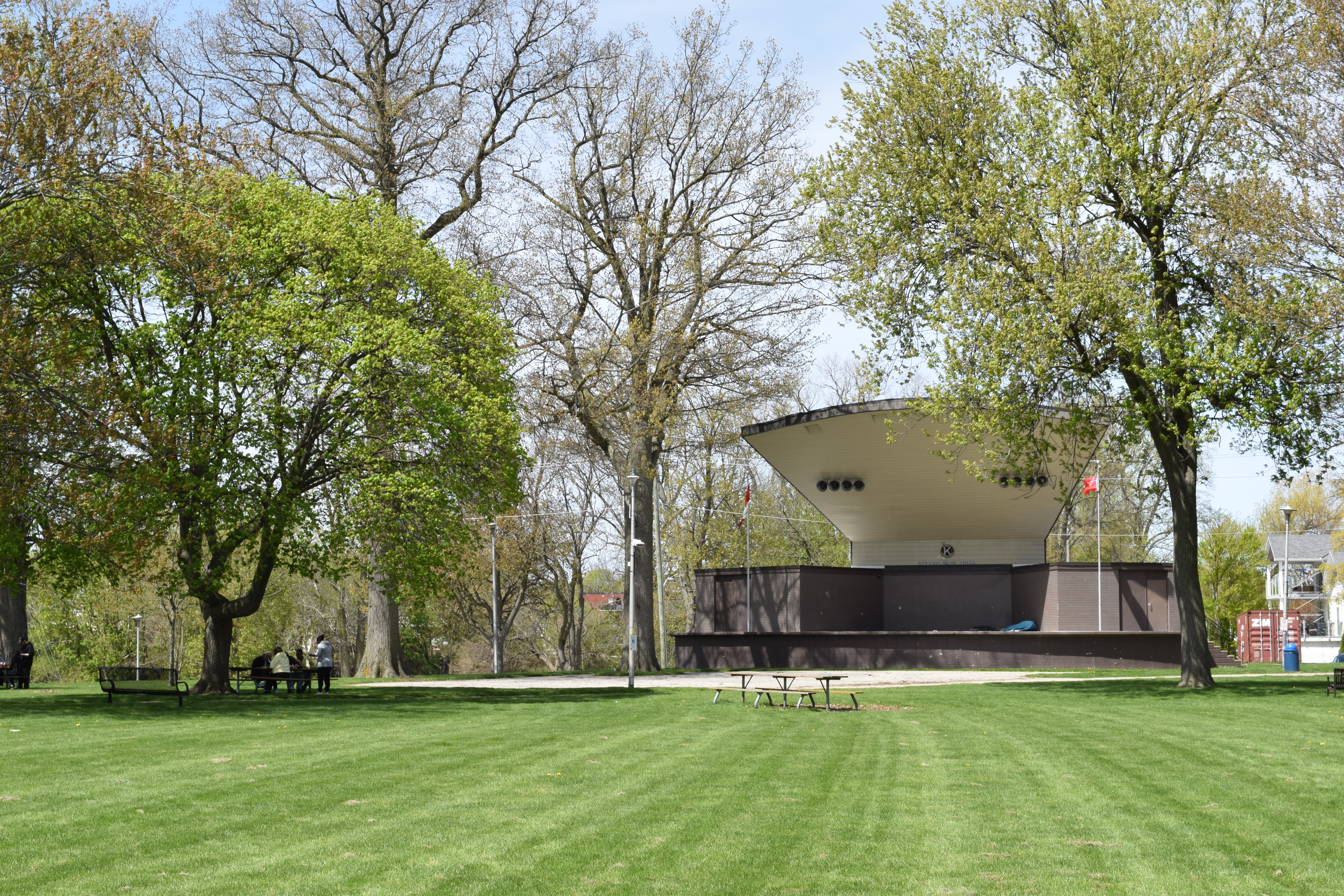
- Downtown Chatham First Presbyterian Church Kiwanis Theatre Kingston Park St. Joseph’s Church Chatham-Kent Civic Centre Bandshell at Tecumseh Park
- Nickname: The Maple City
- Location of Chatham in Chatham-Kent Chatham (Southern Ontario)
- Coordinates: 42°24′20.606″N 82°11′7.535″W
- Country: Canada
- Province: Ontario
- Municipality: Chatham-Kent
- County (Historical): Kent
- Founded: 1794
- Town (Incorp.): 1853
- City (Incorp.): 1895
- Amalgamated: 1998

Area
  - Total: 31.21 km^{2} (12.05 sq mi)

Population (2021)
  - Total: 45,171
  - Density: 1,447.4/km^{2} (3,749/sq mi)
- Demonym: Chathamite
- Time zone: UTC-5 (EST)
  - Summer (DST): UTC-4 (EDT)
- Postal codes: N7L, N7M
- Area code(s): 519, 226, 548, 382

Chatham is an unincorporated community and the most populous settlement in the municipality of Chatham-Kent in Southwestern Ontario, Canada. Formerly an independent city within Kent County, Chatham was amalgamated with its neighbouring municipalities in 1998 to create the current Municipality of Chatham-Kent. It is recognized as a population centre by Statistics Canada.

Historically noteworthy for its role as a terminus of the Underground Railroad in the mid-19th century and characterized throughout much of the 20th century as a centre of automotive manufacturing, Chatham today has a largely suburban, post-industrial character.

== Etymology ==
Chatham was named by John Graves Simcoe after William Pitt, 1st Earl of Chatham. It was established as a naval dockyard town, a characteristic it shares with Chatham, Kent, England. The site of the original dockyard, at the confluence of the Thames River and McGregor's Creek, is reported to have been known as Auch-Kaw Mah'tah (roughly, "rippling forks") to local Indigenous peoples. Prior to the founding of Chatham, this site was known simply as The Forks to European settlers.

== History ==
=== Indigenous History and Early Settlement ===
Long predating the arrival of Europeans, the lands now encompassing Chatham are and have been part of the traditional territories of various Indigenous peoples, including the Odawa, Potawatomi, Ojibwe, and Attawandaron, and by the time of the written treaties, the Lunaapeew.

Prior to European settlement, the site where Chatham is presently located is known to have been a popular gathering spot for local Indigenous communities. Several Indigenous villages are known to have been located in close proximity to modern Chatham, with at least two along McGregor's Creek.

The first Europeans to arrive in the region were likely French explorers and missionaries. Although the land was claimed as part of New France, no permanent settlements or forts were established here, the closest being Fort Detroit, founded in 1701. Following the Seven Years' War, the Treaty of Paris (1763) transferred France's North American territories to Britain. The American Revolution, which followed several years later, subsequently helped catalyze the first significant permanent European settlements in what would become Kent County as United Empire Loyalists fled to settle Upper Canada.

Negotiations for the transfer of lands from Indigenous peoples to the British Crown in the region began around this time, starting with tracts of land south of the Detroit River in 1784 and in 1786 under Treaty 116. The signing of Treaty 2, or the McKee Purchase, on May 19, 1790 by representatives of the Crown and various First Nations formalized these previous agreements and saw the Crown acquire large swaths of land encompassing most of the southern tip of Ontario.

In 1790, pioneer surveyor Patrick McNiff departed from Lake St. Clair and travelled upstream along the Thames River to survey the lands that would, in 1792, become Kent County. During this voyage, McNiff found that some 28 families had already established themselves in the region, suggesting the date of the first permanent European settlement occurred some time between 1775 and 1780. Upon arrival at the fork of the Thames River and McGregor's Creek, McNiff identified the site as a desirable location for a village due to its strategic location and favourable topography. Over the next few years, he conducted the work of laying out the lots fronting on the Thames River in the Townships of Dover East, Chatham, Raleigh, Harwich, and parts of Howard and Camden.

John Graves Simcoe, the then-governor of Upper Canada, travelled through the district in 1793 during a voyage to Detroit. Like McNiff, he recognized the advantageous geography of the fork (from which the Thames was navigable all the way to Lake St. Clair) and selected it as the site to locate a riverine naval station and shipyard, which began operations the next year. Abraham Iredell, who had taken over the task of surveying the area, began to lay out the townsite of Chatham in 1795 where 600 acres had been set aside for a town plot and military reserve. Iredell's house, constructed in 1800, would be the first built in what would become the town of Chatham.

=== 19th Century ===
==== War of 1812 ====
In 1813, following the British retreat from Sandwich and Amherstburg, Shawnee leader Tecumseh advocated that the forks at Chatham (now the site of Tecumseh Park) be the location where his and General Procter's forces would make their stand against the American invasion. Having received Procter's agreement, Tecumseh arrived at the forks expecting fortifications to have been prepared for a full-scale confrontation. Instead, Procter had continued his retreat northward, leaving the site in a near-defenseless state.

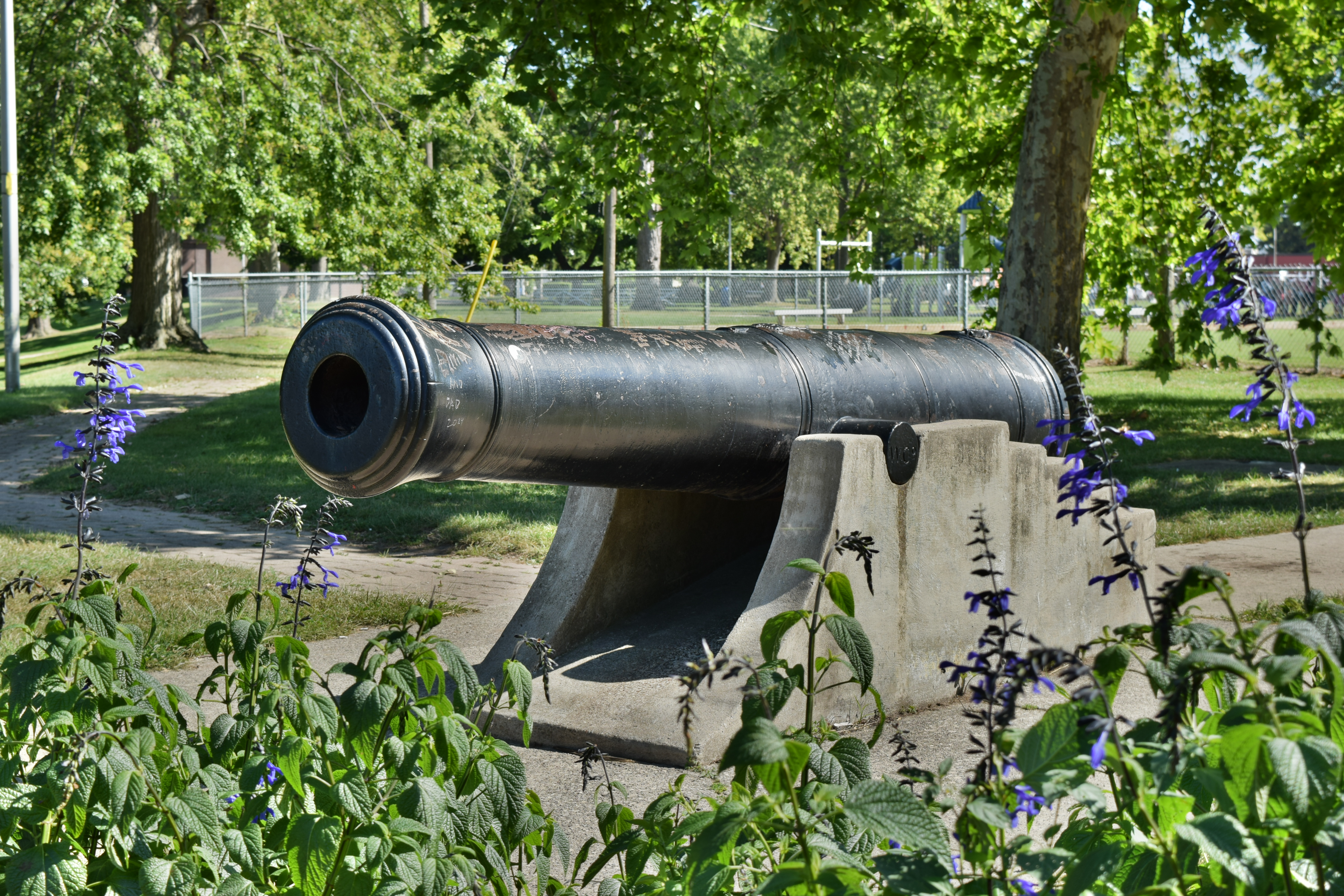
Cannon overlooking the forks at Tecumseh Park

Nevertheless, Tecumseh and his warriors remained to fight a small-scale rearguard action against General Harrison's army on October 4. The battle, which came to be known as the Skirmish at the Forks, was fought across McGregor's Creek and lasted approximately two hours before Tecumseh's warriors were driven off by artillery fire. During the skirmish, two Americans were killed, as were several warriors, and Tecumseh was struck in the arm by a musket ball. Following the defeat, Tecumseh retreated northward, stopping overnight at Arnold's Mill before joining Procter and his forces at the Battle of the Thames near Moraviantown, where he was slain.

Some months later, on the morning of December 15, 1813, Canadian militiamen launched a surprise attack on the 26th U.S. Infantry Regiment, which had established a post at the house of local farmer Thomas McCrae, just outside Chatham. The skirmish resulted in the surrender of the American unit and stands as the only instance during the war in which a force composed entirely of Canadian militia defeated a unit of U.S. Army regulars.

==== Growth into a Town ====
Chatham's shipbuilding and military function had failed to develop as Simcoe had intended, and the settlement failed to grow substantially until after 1820. A contributing factor to this slow growth was Chatham's geography. At the time, the region was heavily timbered and covered in wetlands, which slowed the development of agriculture and deterred settlers. Nevertheless, by the early 1840s, the town's growth had stabilized, and Chatham had surpassed a population of 1,000. Among Chatham's early settlers during this period was William Chrysler, a prominent local blacksmith and farmer and eventual grandfather to Walter Chrysler, founder and namesake of the American Chrysler Corporation.

Bird's Eye View of Chatham (1870)

Up until this point in Chatham's history, travel along the Thames River was the primary means by which the town was connected to the outside world. This changed in 1854 with the southwestern expansion of the Great Western Railway. Chatham, now a stop along the main line from Windsor to Toronto, benefited immensely from its access to the rest of the rapidly expanding rail network across soon-to-be Ontario. The railway not only enabled population growth through increased ease of access but also catalyzed the region's development into an agricultural centre. A local lumber industry, supported by the access the railroad provided to nearby markets and by the trains' own demand for hardwood fuel, contributed to the clearing and conversion of the lands around Chatham to agricultural use.

=== Abolition History ===
Chatham played an important role during the abolitionist period, serving as one of the major termini of the Underground Railroad and as a site of intense abolitionist activity—a role for which it has sometimes been called the "Black Mecca of Canada".

Following the abolition of slavery in the British Empire in 1834, Britain's colonies in Canada became a safe haven for Black people fleeing slavery in the United States, a role that became even more important after the passage of the Fugitive Slave Act of 1850. Located close to the American border and possessing a surplus of undeveloped land, Kent County was well positioned to receive and resettle former slaves. Black and white abolitionists of the era, such as Josiah Henson and William King, worked to facilitate this resettlement, negotiating with Canadian authorities to obtain the necessary land and organizing Black settlements in the countryside.

Situated centrally between the prominent Dawn and Elgin settlements, Chatham absorbed a large number of the Black settlers who arrived in the region, offering an urban alternative to the rural life the settlements provided. By the 1850s, the town's Black population had swelled to nearly one-third of the total, and Black life was flourishing. Black Chathamites were not merely refugees; by this time, the town had seen the formation of an educated and growing Black middle class that included lawyers, doctors, and other businessmen and women, and the town had become home to numerous Black-run shops, businesses, and churches.

During this period, several significant abolitionist, African American, and African Canadian figures crossed paths in Chatham:

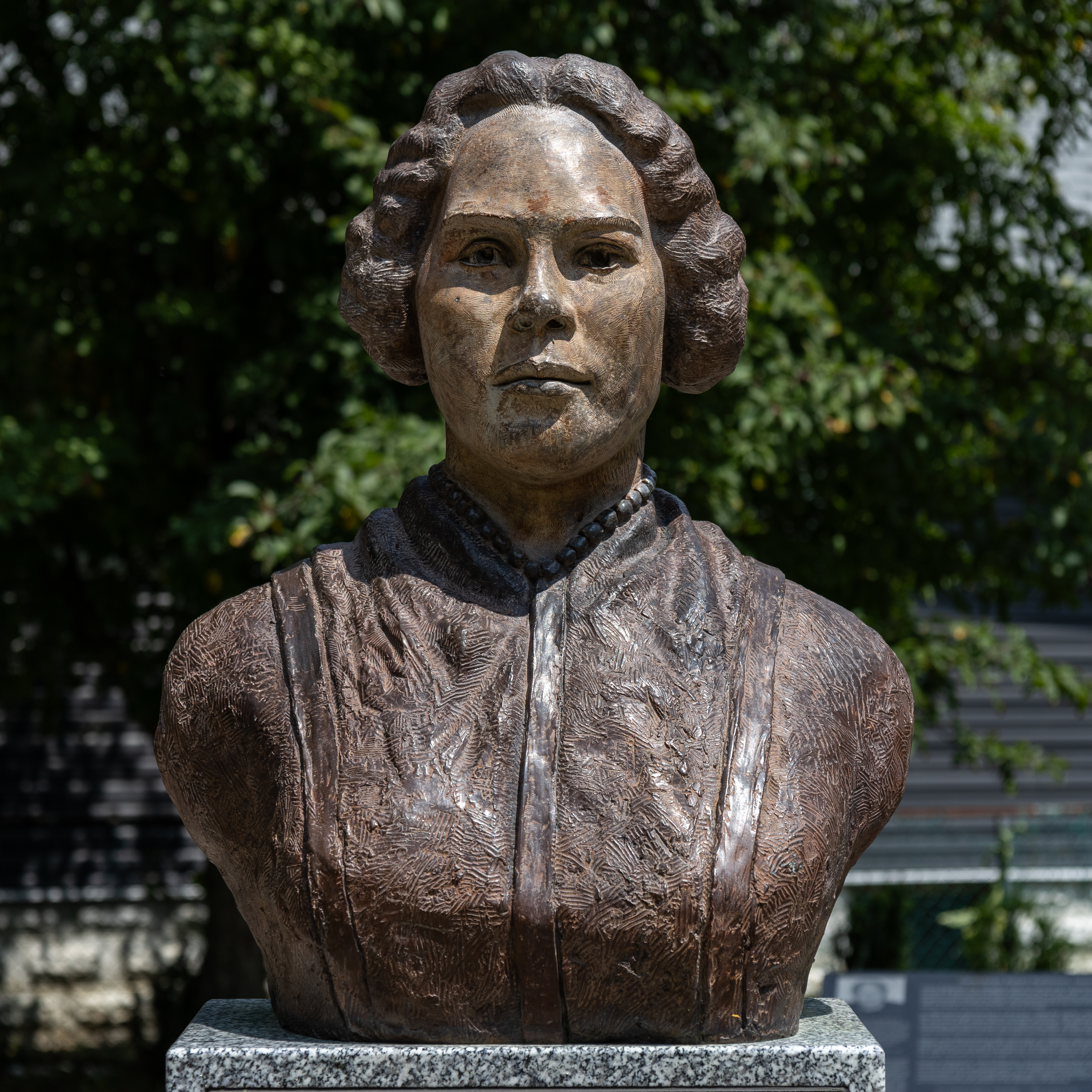
Bust of Mary Ann Shadd, BME Freedom Park, Chatham

- African American-Canadian educator, publisher, lawyer, and abolitionist Mary Ann Shadd moved to Chatham in 1855, along with siblings Isaac and Amelia. First printed in 1853, her newspaper, The Provincial Freeman, is noted for being the first published and edited by a Black woman. Dedicated to the abolitionist cause and arguing for Black self-reliance and emigration to Canada, the paper would be based out of Chatham for the remainder of its print run.
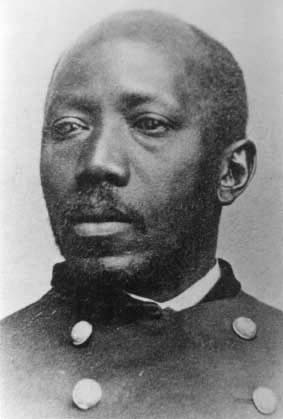
  Martin Delany
- African-American abolitionist, physician, and author Martin Delany lived in Chatham for several years in the 1850s, where he worked as a journalist and physician until the outbreak of the American Civil War. It was during his time in Chatham that he wrote Blake, which, in this respect, might be considered the first African-Canadian novel.
- Irish-born abolitionist William King moved to Chatham before founding the nearby Elgin Settlement in 1849. Established as a model Black community for former slaves, the settlement at its height was home to over 300 families and had achieved some international acclaim.
- African-American printer Osborn Perry Anderson moved to Chatham sometime in the early 1850s. An employee of The Provincial Freeman, Anderson later served as one of John Brown's compatriots during his raid on Harpers Ferry. The raid's only surviving black member, Anderson escaped back to Canada through the Underground Railroad and returned to Chatham to write and publish an account of the incident, A Voice from Harpers Ferry.
- African-American journalist and minister Samuel Ringgold Ward spent time in Chatham while he lived in Canada in the early 1850s and played a role as a founding editor of the The Provincial Freeman.

==== Chatham Vigilance Committee ====
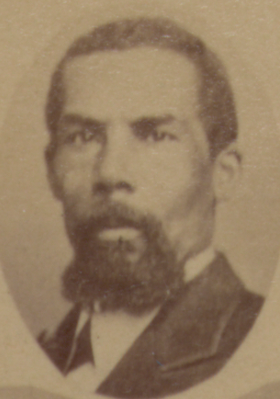
Issac Shadd

The Chatham Vigilance Committee was an organization founded by local abolitionists following the passage of the Fugitive Slave Act of 1850. The committee worked to protect people from being returned or sold into slavery and is best known for the 1858 rescue of Sylvanus Demarest, a kidnapped Black youth being taken to Detroit aboard a southbound train. Upon receiving news of his presence on the train, Isaac Shadd led a group of 100 men aboard during its stop in Chatham and freed Demarest. Seven committee members, including Shadd, were arrested and tried for the incident.

==== John Brown’s Chatham Convention ====
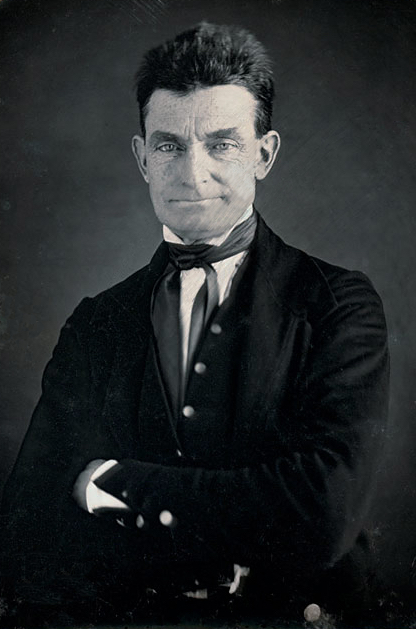
John Brown

Militant abolitionist John Brown arrived in Kent County in April 1858. Seeing the success of the Black communities in and around Chatham—all the product of extra-legal activity and struggle—reinforced Brown's belief that slavery could not be eliminated through lawful means, and he sought to recruit volunteers here to help organize the fight to destroy it.

To this end, Brown met with some of the leading Black men of the community, gave public speeches, and held various meetings and conferences regarding the abolitionist cause. These meetings culminated on May 10, 1858, when Brown convened a secret convention at which he disclosed his plans to launch an open rebellion against the institution of slavery. This Chatham Convention drew 46 attendees—11 white and 35 Black. Martin Delany, Isaac Shadd, Osborn Perry Anderson, John Henry Kagi, Aaron Dwight Stevens, Owen Brown, Richard Realf, Jeremiah Anderson, and John Edwin Cook were among those in attendance.

Brown's rebellion, to be based in the Appalachians, was to wage a guerrilla campaign: freeing and arming slaves, disrupting the Southern economy, inspiring further slave uprisings, and serving, it was hoped, as a death blow against American slavery. To organize this, the Convention adopted a Provisional Constitution written by Brown and elected members to a provisional government and congress. Brown left Chatham on May 29, 1858, returning only once in the summer of 1859 before his raid on Harpers Ferry, Virginia, where his rebellion failed; he was captured, tried, and later executed.

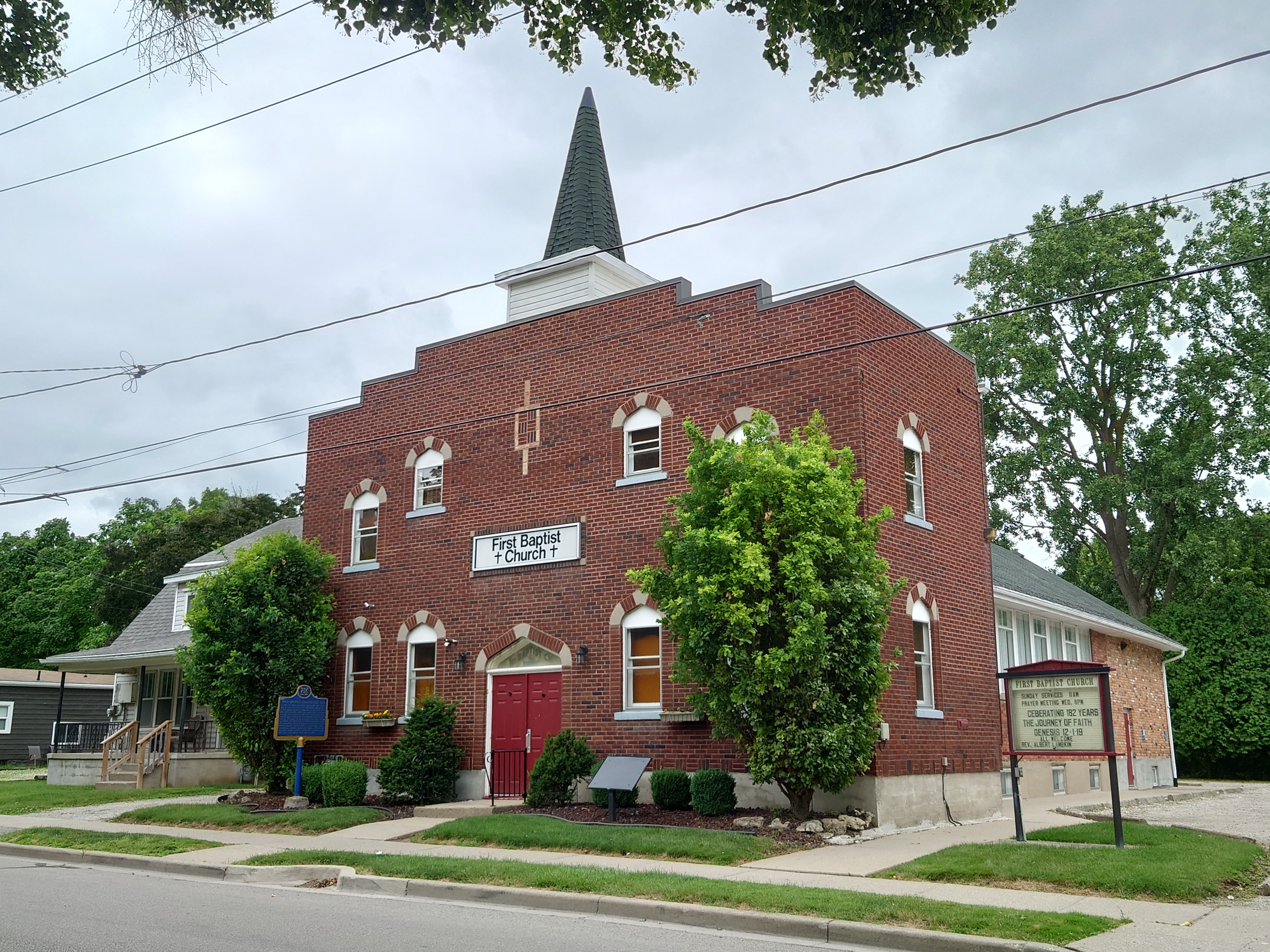
First Baptist Church in 2024

The support Brown ultimately received from Chatham was limited. Although his cause had strong local advocates such as Isaac Shadd, other abolitionist leaders, including William King and Archibald McKellar, advised the freedmen of Chatham not to participate in Brown’s endeavours. Ultimately, Osborn Perry Anderson was the only known Chathamite (and Canadian figure) to have participated in the raid on Harpers Ferry. First Baptist Church, the building where Brown's constitutional convention was held, still exists and is among the few remaining landmarks of Brown’s time in Chatham.

==== Legacy ====
Chatham's role in the Underground Railroad has contributed to Canada's broader national self-perception as a bastion of racial equality and human rights. In contrast to this mythologization, freedmen who had settled in Chatham continued to endure significant racism and discrimination. Despite a popularly held belief in abolitionism, strong anti-Black sentiments persisted among white Chathamites and coloured their treatment of their Black counterparts. In an interview documented by Samuel Gridley Howe in an 1864 report to the Freedmen's Inquiry Commission, a local school principal named Sinclair spoke on the subject:

Our laws know nothing about creed, color, or nationality. If foreign-born, when they take the oath of allegiance, they are the same as natives. But in regard to social prejudice, that is something we cannot help. The colored people are considered inferior, and must remain so for many years, perhaps forever, because their color distinguishes them. [...] Many of the colored people, even in this town, say that if they could have the same privileges in the States that they have here, they would not remain a moment.

— Mr. Sinclair, The Refugees from Slavery in Canada West: The Report to the Freedmen’s Inquiry Commission.

Similarly, in his 1855 autobiography, Samuel Ringgold Ward noted simply:

And yet, there is not a town in Canada, in which the feeling against Negroes is stronger than in Chatham.

— Samuel Ringgold Ward, Autobiography of a Fugitive Negro.

Social life in Chatham remained generally segregated along racial lines. The town was divided between White and Black neighbourhoods, and Black and White Chathamites generally frequented separate schools, shops, and churches. Interracial marriage was extremely taboo, and instances of it often resulted in the white partner being shunned from white society. Racism also manifested in white resistance to further expansion of the town's Black population and to the formation of any new Black settlements nearby.

Following the American Civil War and the abolition of slavery in the United States, large-scale immigration of Black Americans to Canada died down significantly, and many who had resettled in Canada chose to return to the States. Although this effectively ended Chatham's role as a "Black Mecca", Black Chathamites remained and continued to form an important part of the city's social fabric, as well as to make significant cultural contributions to broader Canadian and American society. The proportion of Chatham's black population to the total population would mostly decline over time, from a peak of approximately 33% in the 1850s to just 4.1% in 2021.

The Chatham-Kent Black Historical Society and Black Mecca Museum were established in 1994. Located east of downtown, the museum contains a collection of displays, artifacts and archives dedicated to the history of Chatham-Kent’s Black community. BME Freedom Park was established in 2009. Located on the site of the first British Methodist Episcopal Church in Canada, the park is dedicated to the memory of that local institution, which served as an important religious and community space for over a century. The park prominently features a bust of Mary Ann Shadd.

=== 20th Century ===
==== Early Automotive History ====
At the turn of the century, Chatham was undergoing a surge of industrial activity as new enterprises sprang up rapidly, while older ones continued to expand. It was in this climate that automotive history in Chatham began, with 1900 marking the year horseless carriages first appeared on the city’s streets.

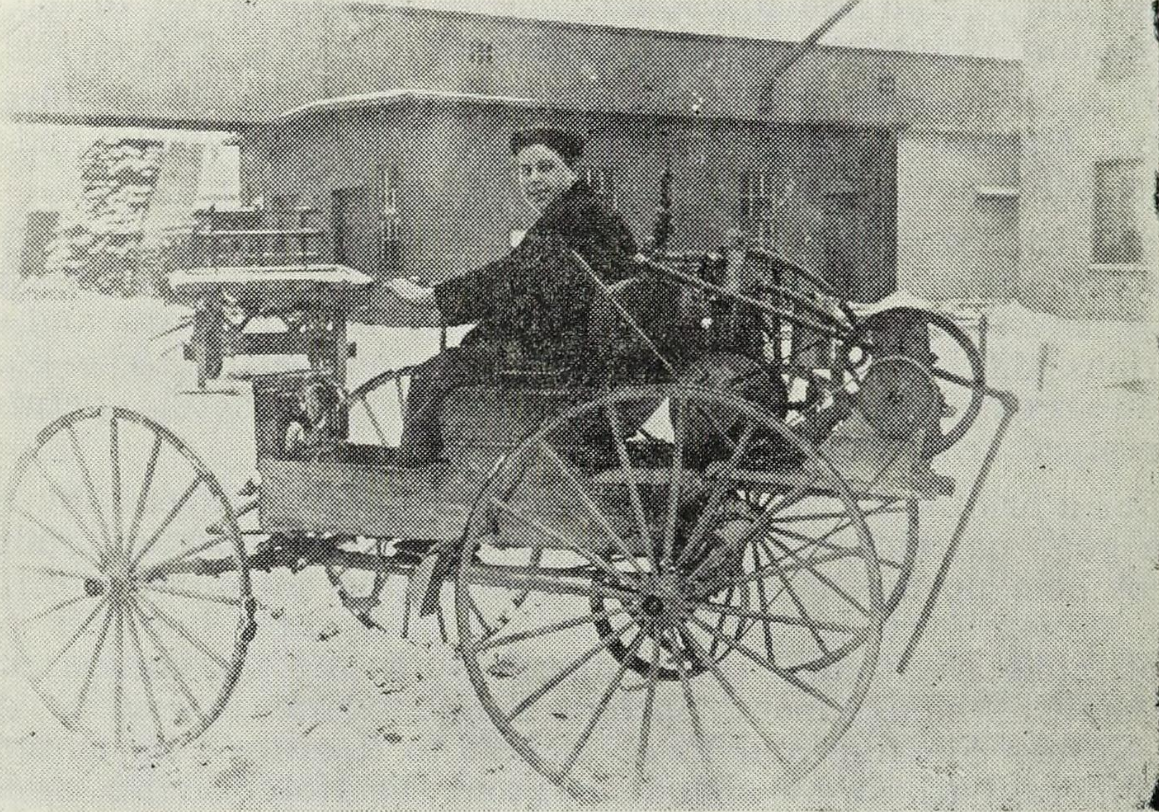
W. M. Gray's 1905 Horseless Carriage

The growing fervour surrounding early commercially built automobiles inspired many local ventures. William Murray Gray of the William Gray & Sons carriage company (established 1855) was an early enthusiast and adopter of the technology. In 1905, he built his own horseless carriage (the first car to be both designed and built in Chatham) before steering his whole company into the burgeoning motor car industry. In 1911, William Gray & Sons merged with another local manufacturer, the Manson Campbell Fanning Mill Company, to form Gray-Campbell. The new company soon began producing car bodies for Ford Canada’s Walkerville plant, starting in 1912. Then, in 1915, William Gray secured a license agreement with the Dort Motors Company of Flint, Michigan, and the newly formed Gray-Dort Motors Ltd. took over the existing Gray and Campbell plants.

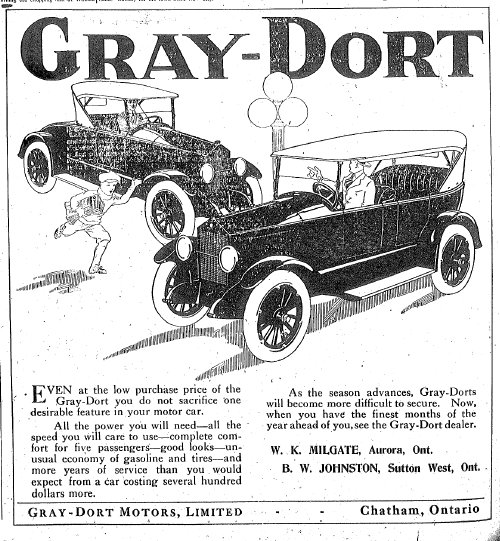
Gray-Dort Newspaper Ad

The domestically manufactured Gray-Dort cars proved popular in Canada and the company, buoyed by strong sales, was in good financial health. However, its success was short-lived, as Dort Motors abruptly ended its license agreement in 1923. Cut off from easy access to U.S.-made mechanical parts, the company’s financial position deteriorated quickly. Unable to secure a new American affiliate, Gray-Dort ceased operations in 1925. In its 10 years of operation, the company had produced roughly 26,600 cars and at its peak employed over 800 men.

Several other automobile manufacturers also established themselves in Chatham during this period:

- The Chatham Carriage Company (1907-1908/09) built car bodies under designs licensed from the REO Motor Car Company.
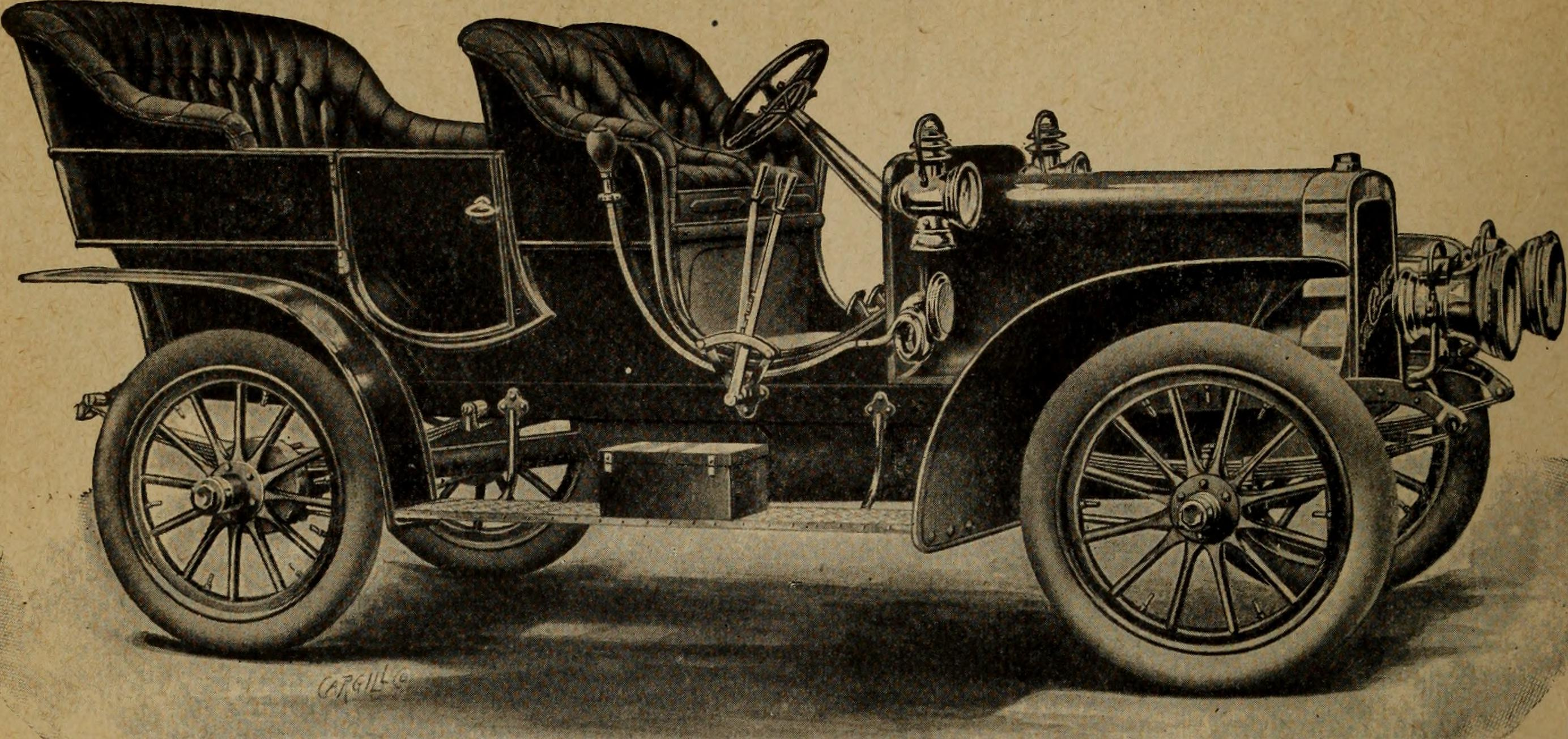
  1907 illustration of a "Chatham"
- The Chatham Motor Car Company (1906–1909) produced its own domestic design, the “Chatham,” for several years before going bankrupt; its factory was sold in 1910 to Detroit’s Anhut Motor Car Company, which briefly continued producing badge-engineered Chathams before it too went bankrupt that same year.
- The International Harvester Company arrived in Chatham in 1910 after purchasing the Chatham Wagon Works. Later known as Navistar and now as International Motors, the company remained one of Chatham’s largest employers until its plant finally closed in 2011.

==== The World Wars ====
At the beginning of the First World War, the military presence in Chatham at the time consisted of the 24th Kent Regiment of the Canadian Militia, formed in 1901. Upon the outbreak of the war, the regiment was enlarged and mobilized. Though the 24th Kent never saw front-line service itself, it recruited companies for numerous overseas battalions, which went on to serve in several significant battles during the war, including Hill 70, St. Eloi, Ypres, Passchendaele, Vimy Ridge, and the Somme. Noteworthy among these volunteers was Cpl. Harry G. Bethune Miner of Chatham, who was awarded the British Victoria Cross and the French Croix de Guerre for his actions in battle against the Germans near Demuin on August 8, 1918. Immediately after the outbreak of war, the Chatham Citizens Relief Fund was formed to support the families of local soldiers. The organization operated independently before being absorbed into the Canadian Patriotic Fund in 1915.

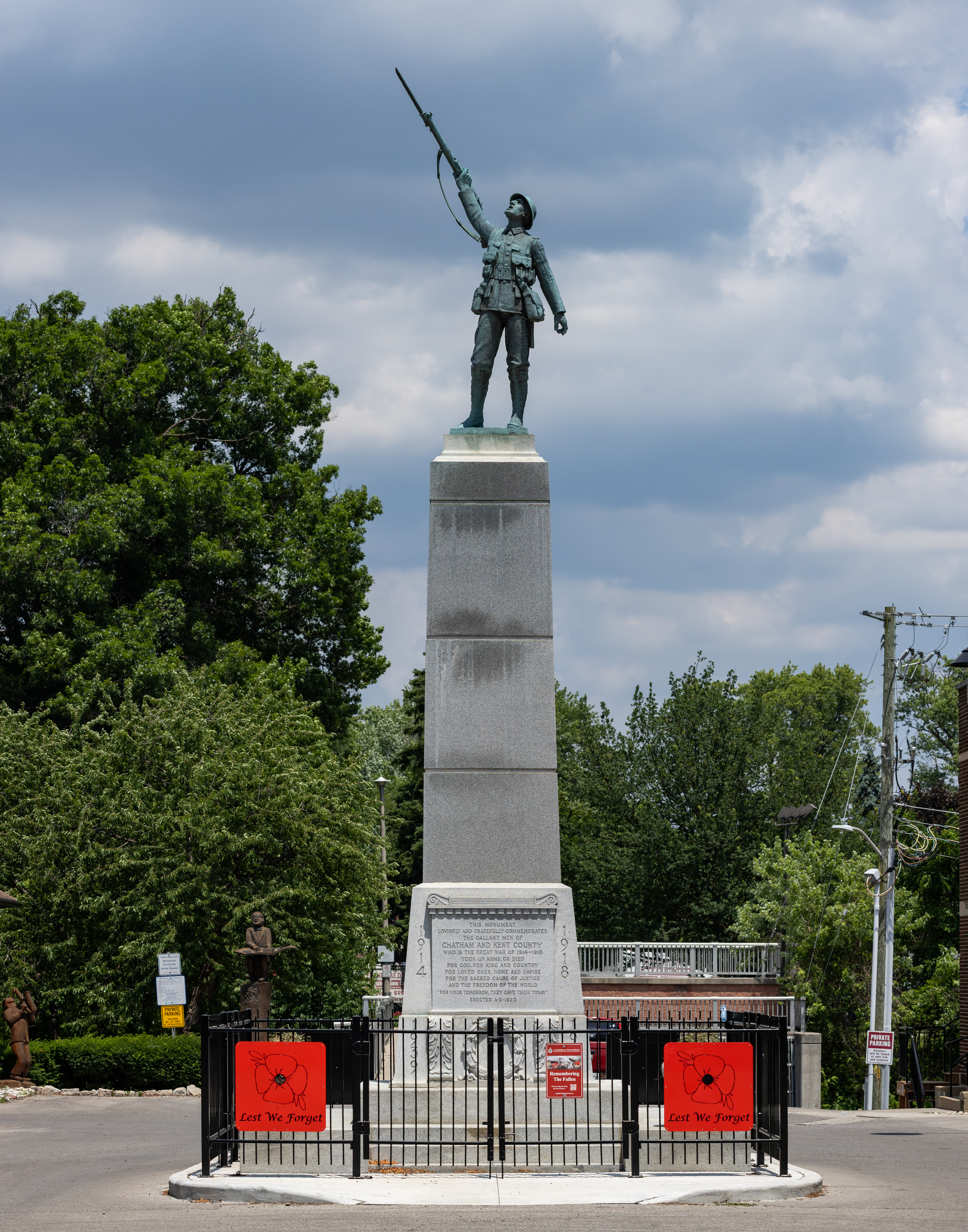
The Chatham Cenotaph

The Kent Regiment was mobilized again during the Second World War. Once more, the unit itself was never sent overseas, and was instead deployed for domestic garrison and coastal defence duties, including in Niagara, the Maritimes, and British Columbia. It did, however, provide reinforcements to units fighting overseas — particularly the Essex Scottish, which contained a large number of Kent Regiment men during the war and took part in the Dieppe Raid and the liberation of France and the Netherlands. Several years after the war, the two units were merged into the Essex and Kent Scottish.

In 1923, the Chatham Cenotaph was erected in downtown Chatham in remembrance of local soldiers who served in the First World War. The names of those who served in the Second World War, the Korean War, and the War in Afghanistan were later added to the memorial. In November 2025, a plaque commemorating the Skirmish at the Forks, fought near the site where the statue stands, was erected nearby.

==== Amalgamation ====
The amalgamation of Chatham into Chatham-Kent occurred in 1998 under the direction of Mike Harris’s Progressive Conservative provincial government, in line with the rollout of his government’s “Common Sense Revolution”.

The political process that ultimately resulted in the creation of Chatham-Kent began several years earlier in 1996, when several Kent County municipalities, driven in part by frustrations with the County’s governance and tax structure, began local restructuring talks. The prospect of amalgamation was highly controversial, and the form that restructuring would take, if it was to happen at all, was subject to intense debate between municipal representatives, with no position able to achieve majority support.

Eventually, a plan was advanced to create five new municipal entities in Kent County, which would surround a separate City of Chatham. In advance of a January 1997 deadline imposed by the Province, this solution was scheduled to be put to a vote at County Council on January 22, 1997. However, before the vote could be called, anti-amalgamation council member Claude Johnson of Orford Township suddenly collapsed and died of a heart attack on the council floor. The vote was rescheduled for the following week but again failed to be held, as, following Johnson’s death, 18 councillors boycotted the meeting, leaving council unable to achieve quorum.

Frustrated by the lack of progress, Al Leach, the provincial Minister of Municipal Affairs and Housing, appointed Dr. Peter Meyboom to oversee the restructuring on February 6, 1997, taking control of the reform process out of municipal hands. Following limited local consultation, Meyboom produced a draft proposal in which local councils were left with a choice of two options: a streamlined two-tier county system, or the complete amalgamation of all lower-tier governments, including Chatham, and the dissolution of the county government. Twenty-one of the 22 existing municipalities voted against complete amalgamation; nevertheless, this was the option Meyboom chose to force through. The decision, announced in April 1997, was binding, with no avenue for appeal, despite significant local opposition.

=== Post-Amalgamation ===
In February 2018, the Thames River watershed experienced a historic flood event resulting from a short period of heavy rainfall coinciding with a heat event where temperatures briefly rose above 10 °C. While the snowpack melted, the ground underneath remained frozen and unable to absorb water from rain or melting snow, exacerbating conditions. In response, the Municipality of Chatham-Kent declared a state of emergency as evacuation and rescue operations were conducted across the municipality, including in Chatham, where the downtown was severely affected. No fatalities or injuries were reported; however, the flood resulted in significant damage to private property and municipal infrastructure.

== Geography ==
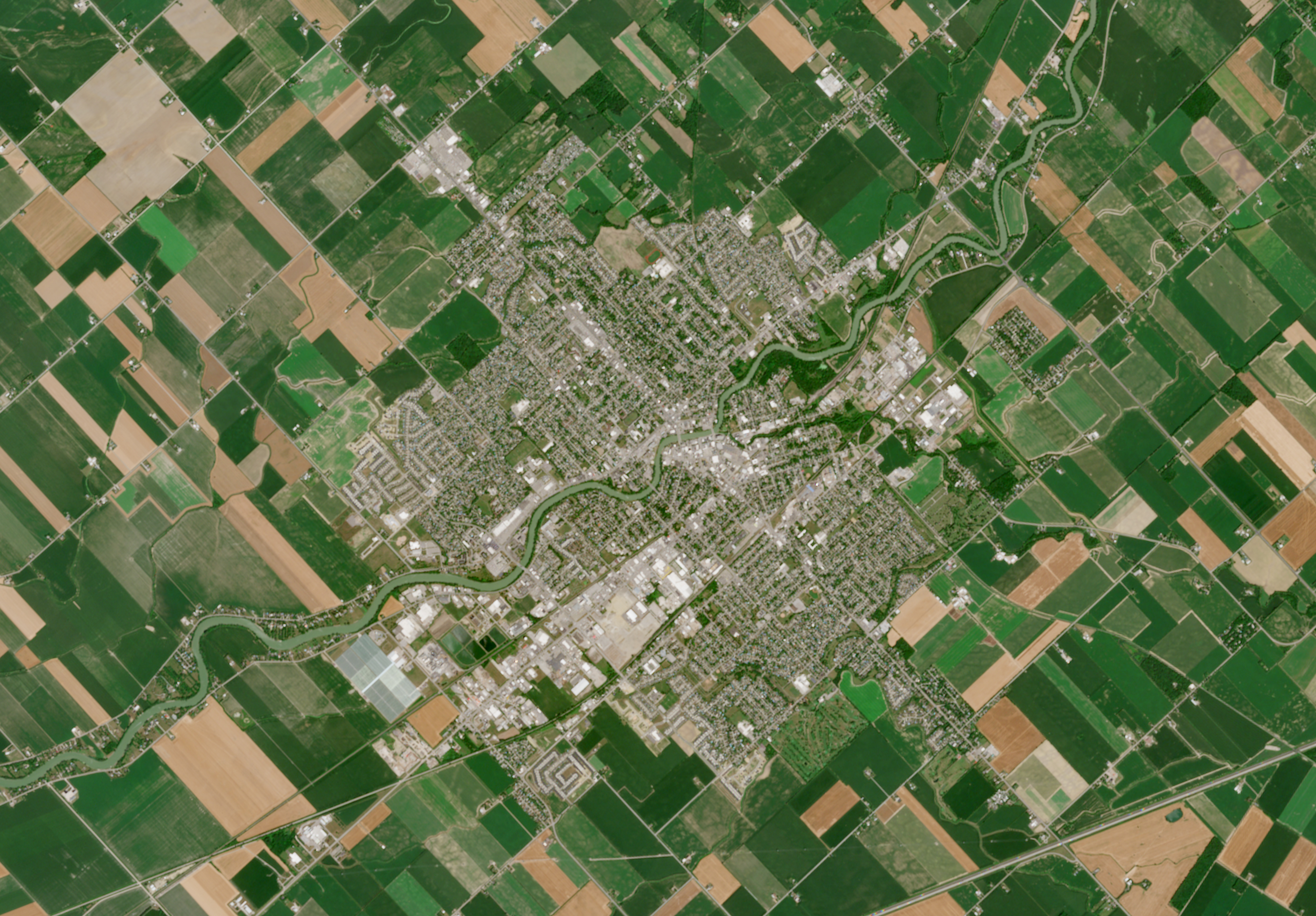
Satellite imagery of Chatham in July 2025

The population centre of Chatham covers an area of 31.21 square kilometres (12.05 sq mi). It is centrally located within the Municipality of Chatham-Kent, lying at a roughly equal distance from both Lake St. Clair and Lake Erie. The city is divided into two roughly equal halves by the Thames River, which flows southwesterly through the city. Downtown Chatham is located along the southern bank of the river, near the fork with McGregor's Creek. Whereas historically much of the land in and around Chatham consisted of forests and wetlands (upwards of 53.7% of Chatham was once wetland), following European colonization the vast majority of Kent County was drained, clear-cut, and cultivated for agriculture. As a result, the urban area of Chatham now lies surrounded by a vast expanse of farmland and fields, a characteristic that has come to shape the community's rural cultural self-perception.

== Climate ==
Chatham has a humid continental climate (Köppen climate classification Dfa), with cold, snowy winters and warm to hot, humid summers. A typical summer will feature heat waves with temperatures exceeding 30 °C (86 °F) often. Winters are cold, and feature occasional cold snaps bringing temperatures below −15 °C (5 °F), but also commonly include mild stretches of weather above freezing.

Climate data for Chatham, Ontario, Canada (1991–2020 normals, extremes 1886–2026) WMO ID: 71307; coordinates 42°27′N 81°53′W; elevation: 205.7 m (675 ft)
Month	Jan	Feb	Mar	Apr	May	Jun	Jul	Aug	Sep	Oct	Nov	Dec	Year
Record high °C (°F)	17.2 (63.0)	19.4 (66.9)	25.6 (78.1)	31.1 (88.0)	33.9 (93.0)	40.0 (104.0)	40.6 (105.1)	37.5 (99.5)	37.2 (99.0)	31.9 (89.4)	23.9 (75.0)	18.5 (65.3)	40.6 (105.1)
Mean daily maximum °C (°F)	12.4 (54.3)	13.7 (56.7)	20.2 (68.4)	21.6 (70.9)	26.2 (79.2)	29.0 (84.2)	30.0 (86.0)	28.9 (84.0)	28.9 (84.0)	24.7 (76.5)	19.3 (66.7)	15.1 (59.2)	22.5 (72.5)
Daily mean °C (°F)	−4.5 (23.9)	−3.6 (25.5)	1.2 (34.2)	7.4 (45.3)	13.7 (56.7)	19.3 (66.7)	21.4 (70.5)	20.3 (68.5)	16.9 (62.4)	10.8 (51.4)	4.5 (40.1)	−0.8 (30.6)	8.9 (48.0)
Mean daily minimum °C (°F)	−24.3 (−11.7)	−22.9 (−9.2)	−18.1 (−0.6)	−5.5 (22.1)	1.4 (34.5)	8.1 (46.6)	12.6 (54.7)	11.7 (53.1)	5.0 (41.0)	0.6 (33.1)	−10.2 (13.6)	−19.4 (−2.9)	−5.1 (22.8)
Record low °C (°F)	−29.4 (−20.9)	−31.9 (−25.4)	−25.1 (−13.2)	−12.2 (10.0)	−6.7 (19.9)	−2.2 (28.0)	2.8 (37.0)	0.6 (33.1)	−4.5 (23.9)	−10.0 (14.0)	−20.0 (−4.0)	−27.0 (−16.6)	−31.9 (−25.4)
Average precipitation mm (inches)	83.4 (3.28)	60.8 (2.39)	64.4 (2.54)	86.5 (3.41)	83.1 (3.27)	77.8 (3.06)	75.0 (2.95)	74.2 (2.92)	81.3 (3.20)	72.2 (2.84)	73.9 (2.91)	70.1 (2.76)	902.8 (35.54)
Average precipitation days (≥ 0.2 mm)	16.7	14.3	13.7	14.6	14.3	13.1	11.3	10.7	11.5	12.7	14.0	15.5	162.4
Average relative humidity (%) (at 15:00 LST)	78.4	75.1	68.9	59.2	59.8	58.9	60.3	63.1	61.9	63.1	70.5	79.0	66.5
Source: Environment and Climate Change Canada

== Demographics ==
Historical Population
Year	Pop.	±%
1851	2,070	—
1861	4,466	+115.7%
1871	5,873	+31.5%
1881	7,873	+34.1%
1891	9,052	+15.0%
1901	9,068	+0.2%
1911	10,770	+18.8%
1921	13,256	+23.1%
1931	14,569	+9.9%
1941	17,369	+19.2%
1951	21,218	+22.2%
1961	29,826	+40.6%
1971	35,317	+18.4%
1981	40,190	+13.8%
1986	42,210	+5.0%
1991	42,515	+0.7%
1996	43,409	+2.1%
2001	43,690	+0.6%
2016	43,550	−0.3%
2021	45,171	+3.7%

In the 2021 Census of Population conducted by Statistics Canada, Chatham had a population of 45,171 living in 19,735 of its 20,559 total private dwellings, a change of 3.7% from its 2016 population of 43,550. With a land area of 31.21 km^{2} (12.05 sq mi), it had a population density of 1,447.4/km^{2} (558.8/sq mi) in 2021.

=== Ethnicity ===
Approximately 85.6% of residents were European Canadians in 2021, whereas 8.21% were visible minorities and 3.96% were Indigenous. The largest visible minority groups in Chatham were Black (4.13%), South Asian (2.33%), Latin American (0.72%), Southeast Asian (0.70%), Chinese (0.52%), Arab (0.50%), and Filipino (0.42%).

=== Language ===
The most common mother tongue in 2021 was English; spoken by 87.7% of the population, followed by French (2.1%), Dutch (0.9%), Portuguese (0.7%), Polish (0.6%), Italian (0.6%), Vietnamese (0.4%), Spanish (0.4%), and Arabic (0.4%). 1.2% of residents claimed both English and a non-official language as their first language.

=== Religion ===
In 2021, 61.5% of Chathamites identified as Christian, with Catholics (29.1%) making up the largest denomination, followed by the United Church (6.1%), Anglicans (4.4%), Baptists (2.8%), and Presbyterians (2.0%), among others. 34.7% of the population stated no religion. All other religions and spiritual traditions combined accounted for 3.8% of the population. The largest non-Christian religions were Islam (1.6%), Hinduism (0.8%), Sikhism (0.4%), Buddhism (0.4%), and Judaism (0.1%).

== Culture ==
=== Architecture ===
Queen Anne-style home near Tecumseh Park

Many of the oldest standing buildings in Chatham date from the mid-19th to early 20th century and were often built in or influenced by the then-popular Gothic Revival, Queen Anne, Edwardian Classicist, and Romanesque Revival styles. Concentrated in Chatham's downtown and inner neighbourhoods, these buildings contribute significantly to the character of the local built environment. The neoclassical Kent County Courthouse and Jail (1850), located northeast of downtown, was designed by architect William Thomas; Alexander Mackenzie, who worked on the building as a stonemason, would later become the first Liberal Prime Minister of Canada.

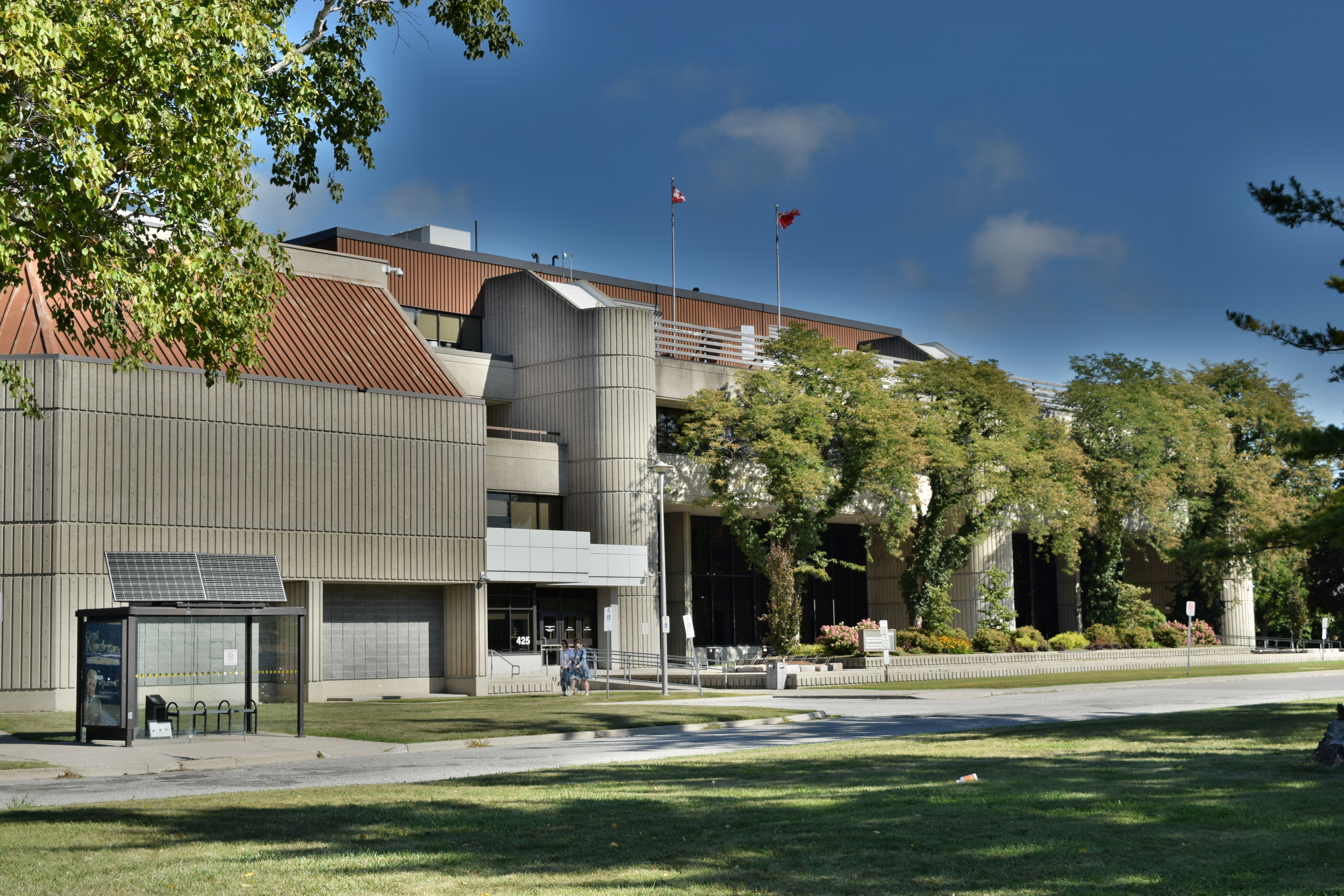
Former Kent County Municipal Building, designed by Joseph Storey

Notably, internationally renowned modernist architect Joseph Storey (1923-1975) was based in Chatham during the city’s period of growth in the mid-20th century. Over the decades, Storey and his practice were responsible for the design of over one thousand buildings across Ontario spanning a wide variety of uses, from single-family homes to industrial and institutional buildings. Storey’s practice contributed many of Chatham’s landmark buildings, including the Federal Post Office Building (now the Government of Canada Building) (1957), Ursuline Convent, Ursuline Motherhouse Chapel, and Ursuline College (1958–1962), the Kent County Municipal Building (now host to various uses including the Ontario Court of Justice) (1967), and the Chatham (now Chatham-Kent) Civic Centre (1975), among others.

=== Classic Cars ===
Rooted in its history as a centre of automotive manufacturing, Chatham (and Chatham-Kent at large) has developed a strong automotive culture and a particular fascination with vintage cars. The area has come to be well known as the "Classic Car Capital of Canada," owing to the many classic car shows and auctions held there each spring and summer. The largest and best known of these is RetroFest, held annually since 2001, typically in late May. RM Sotheby's, among the world's largest international classic car auction companies, began its life as a small restoration shop in Chatham in the 1970s and remains headquartered in Chatham-Kent to this day.

== Sports ==
Chatham is currently home to the following youth, minor league, and post-secondary sports teams:

Team	Sport	League	Founded	Main venue
Chatham Maroons	Ice Hockey	Greater Ontario Hockey League	1959	Chatham Memorial Arena
Chatham-Kent Cyclones	Ice Hockey	Ontario Minor Hockey Association	1993	Chatham Memorial Arena
Chatham-Kent Barnstormers	Baseball	Canadian Baseball League	2024	Fergie Jenkins Field
Chatham-Kent Cougars	Canadian Football	Ontario Summer Football League (OSFL)	2008	Chatham-Kent Secondary School (CKSS) Main Field
Kent Havoc	Rugby Union	Niagara Rugby Union	2001	Kent Havoc Field

== Transportation ==
=== Road ===
Chatham lies a few kilometres north of provincial Highway 401, which runs across Southern Ontario from Windsor in the west, through the Greater Toronto Area, to the Ontario–Quebec border in the east.

=== Public Transport ===
==== History ====
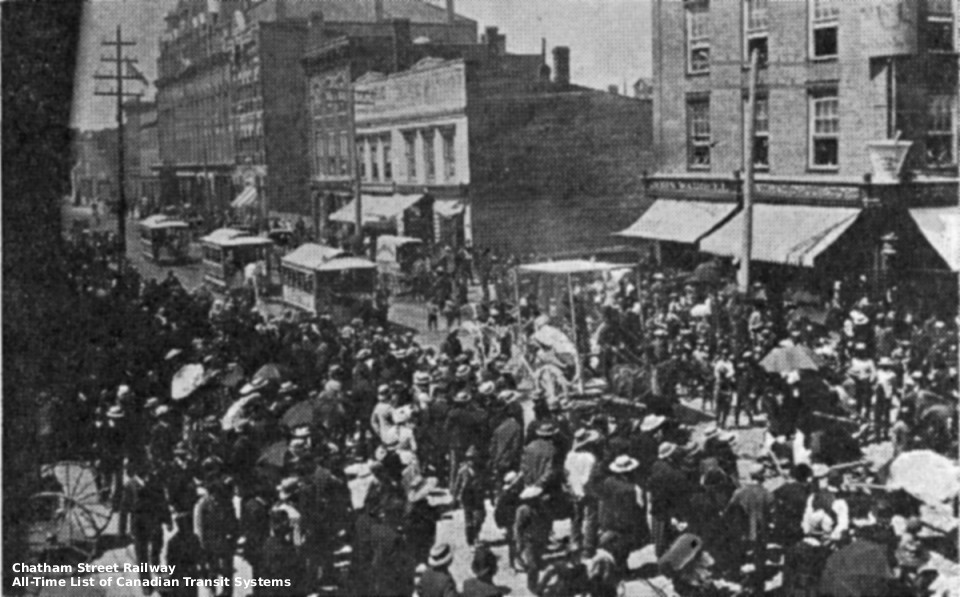
Three Chatham Street Railway horsecars in operation

The history of modern public transport in Chatham began with an animal-powered street railway system operated by the private Chatham Street Railway Company from 1885 to 1890. While most horsecar systems were eventually converted to electric operation, the Chatham Street Railway Company collapsed due to financial and legal troubles before this could occur. This failure to transition from an existing animal-powered system to an electric one is unique in the Canadian context.

The first implementation of a proper municipal public transit service in Chatham followed nearly 60 years later in 1946. Conventional bus service was provided by several operators over the decades, including Chatham Bus Limited (1946–1947), Chatham Bus Service (1947–1948), Chatham Coach Lines (1948–1977), and finally Chatham Transit (1977–2002).

Following amalgamation in 1998, responsibilities for local transit services across the former County were eventually taken over and consolidated by the newly established Municipality of Chatham-Kent. The municipality’s newly unified provider, which operated as “Chatham-Kent Transit” from 2003–2021, gradually expanded its offerings over time, introducing fixed-route inter-urban services beginning in 2007, a smart card payment system in 2014, an affordable pass for low-income riders in 2017, and on-demand services in 2020. A new official transit master plan, “Driving Forward,” was adopted by the municipality in 2020, outlining several policy and operational reforms and recommendations aimed at improving and expanding services. As part of the implementation of “Driving Forward,” the service was rebranded “Ride CK” in 2021, coinciding with a major expansion of the bus fleet.

==== Ride CK ====
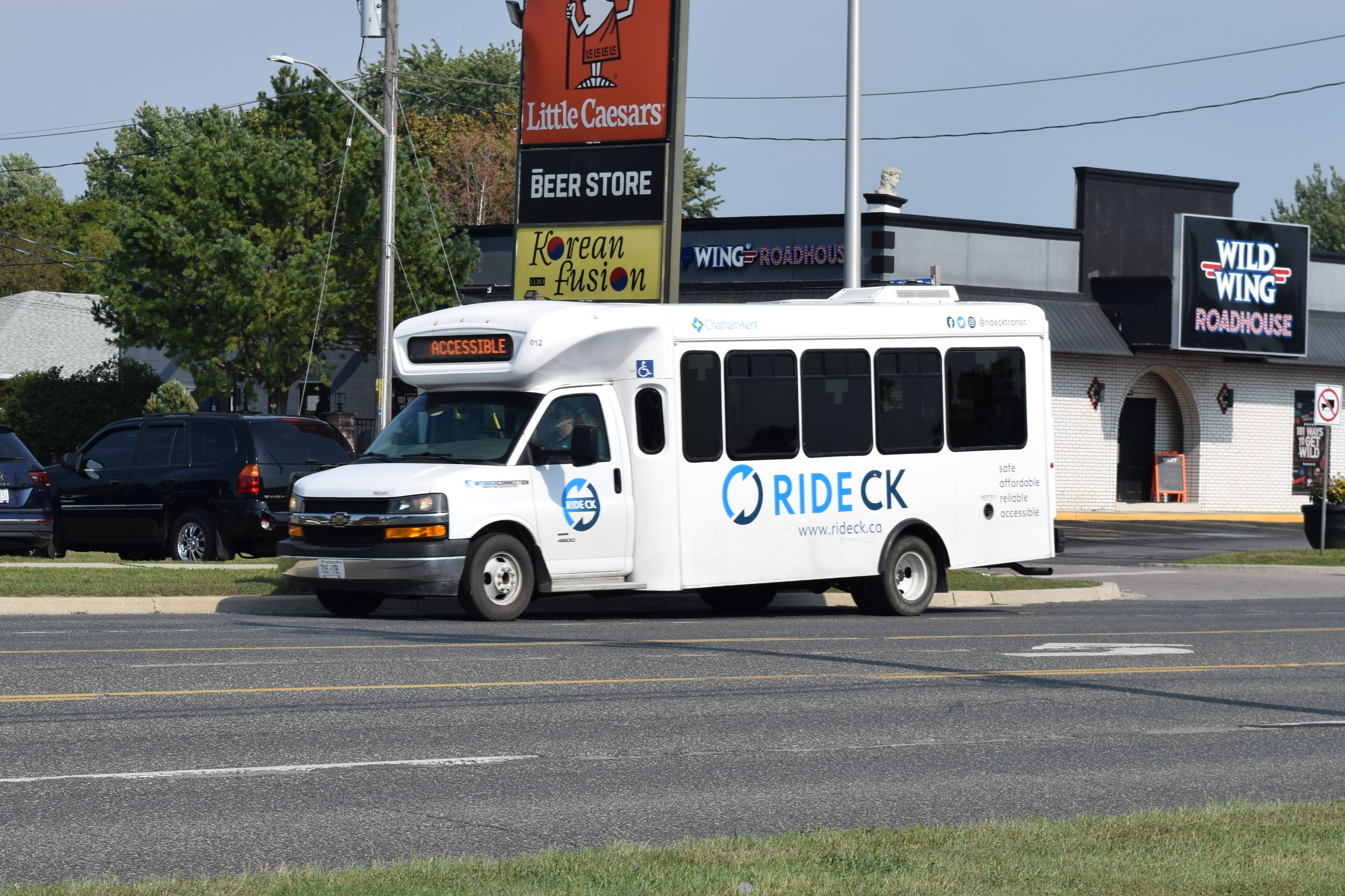
Ride CK bus on route

Chatham is currently served by all of Ride CK’s fixed bus routes. Of them, five operate entirely within Chatham, while the city serves as the hub linking the municipality’s three inter-urban routes, which connect it to Dresden, Wallaceburg, Ridgetown, Blenheim, and Tilbury, among other smaller outlying communities. Ride CK’s fixed routes are served by a fleet consisting mostly of Chevrolet Arboc Specialty Vehicles, as well as more recently acquired full-size Alexander Dennis Enviro200 buses. Ram ProMaster vans are used for the accessible on-demand services.

=== Railways ===
==== Canadian National ====
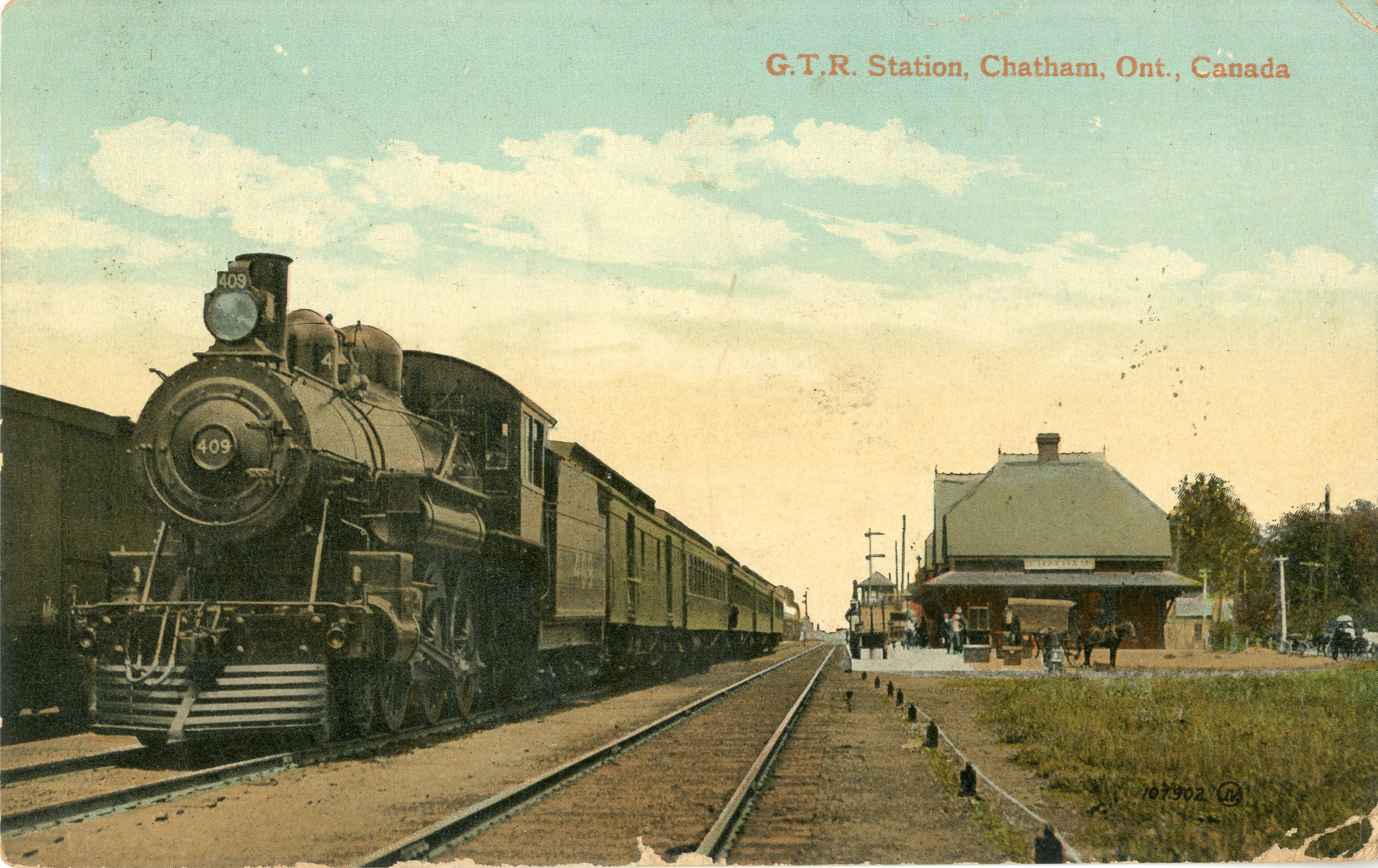
Postcard of the Chatham Grand Trunk Railway station, circa 1912. The building continues to serve as Chatham's VIA Rail station.

The Chatham Subdivision, operated by CN as part of its Windsor–Toronto main line, passes through southern Chatham and carries both freight and passenger traffic. This corridor was part of the historic Great Western/Grand Trunk route running between Windsor and Toronto, which originally opened in 1854. Passenger service is currently provided by VIA Rail, and the Chatham VIA Rail station receives four trains in each direction per day as part of the Quebec City–Windsor Corridor service. The existing station building, originally constructed in 1879, is built in the Gothic Revival style and is a designated Heritage Railway Station of Canada.

Also operated by CN is the Sarnia Spur, which it acquired from CSX in 2006. The route, which runs on a north–south alignment between eastern Chatham and Blenheim, is a remnant of the Erie and Huron Railroad. The full route, originally completed in 1886, ran from Sarnia through Chatham to Erieau.

==== Canadian Pacific Kansas City ====
Running roughly parallel to CN's main line, several hundred metres to the northeast, are tracks belonging to CPKC's Windsor Subdivision. Originally built by the Ontario and Quebec Railway Company, the line was acquired by Canadian Pacific in 1889 and runs between London and Windsor. While Canadian Pacific historically provided passenger service along this line, serving Chatham at a station on William Street, this service has long since been discontinued, and the track is now used exclusively for freight.

=== Air ===
Chatham-Kent operates a municipal airport located 12.5 km southeast of Chatham, featuring a 1,500-metre paved, lighted runway, refuelling facilities, tie-down services, pilot training, and chartered flights. The nearest airports served by regional carriers are in Windsor and London.

== Notable people ==
- Andy Fantuz, former professional football player
- Anna H. Jones, Canadian-born American suffragette
- Bill Atkinson, former professional baseball pitcher
- Bridget Carleton, professional basketball player
- Chatham Coloured All-Stars, 1930s amateur baseball team noted for breaking colour barriers in Canadian/American sports
- Derek Whitson, ice sledge hockey player
- Doug Melvin, Major League Baseball front-office executive, former general manager, and minor-league pitcher
- Elyse Weinberg, singer-songwriter
- Ferguson “Fergie” Jenkins, former professional baseball pitcher and coach
- Geoff O'Hara, composer, singer, and music professor
- James Couzen, Chatham-born American businessman, politician, and philanthropist
- Jessie McPherson, professional ice hockey player
- Joseph Storey, modernist architect
- Judy LaMarsh, Canadian Minister of Health, Secretary of State, lawyer, author, and broadcaster
- June Callwood, journalist, author, and activist
- Richard Doyle, Canadian Senator, journalist, and editor
- Ron Pardo, actor and comedian
- Ron Sparks, comedian, actor, writer, and producer
- Ryan Jones, former professional ice hockey player
- Sam Panopoulos, Greek-Canadian credited with the invention of the Hawaiian Pizza in while living and working in Chatham
- Sophia B. Jones, Chatham-born physician and first black female graduate of the University of Michigan Medical School
- Shae-Lynn Bourne, Olympic ice dancer and choreographer
- Sylvia Tyson, singer-songwriter, musician, and broadcaster
