= McGregor's Creek (Ontario) =

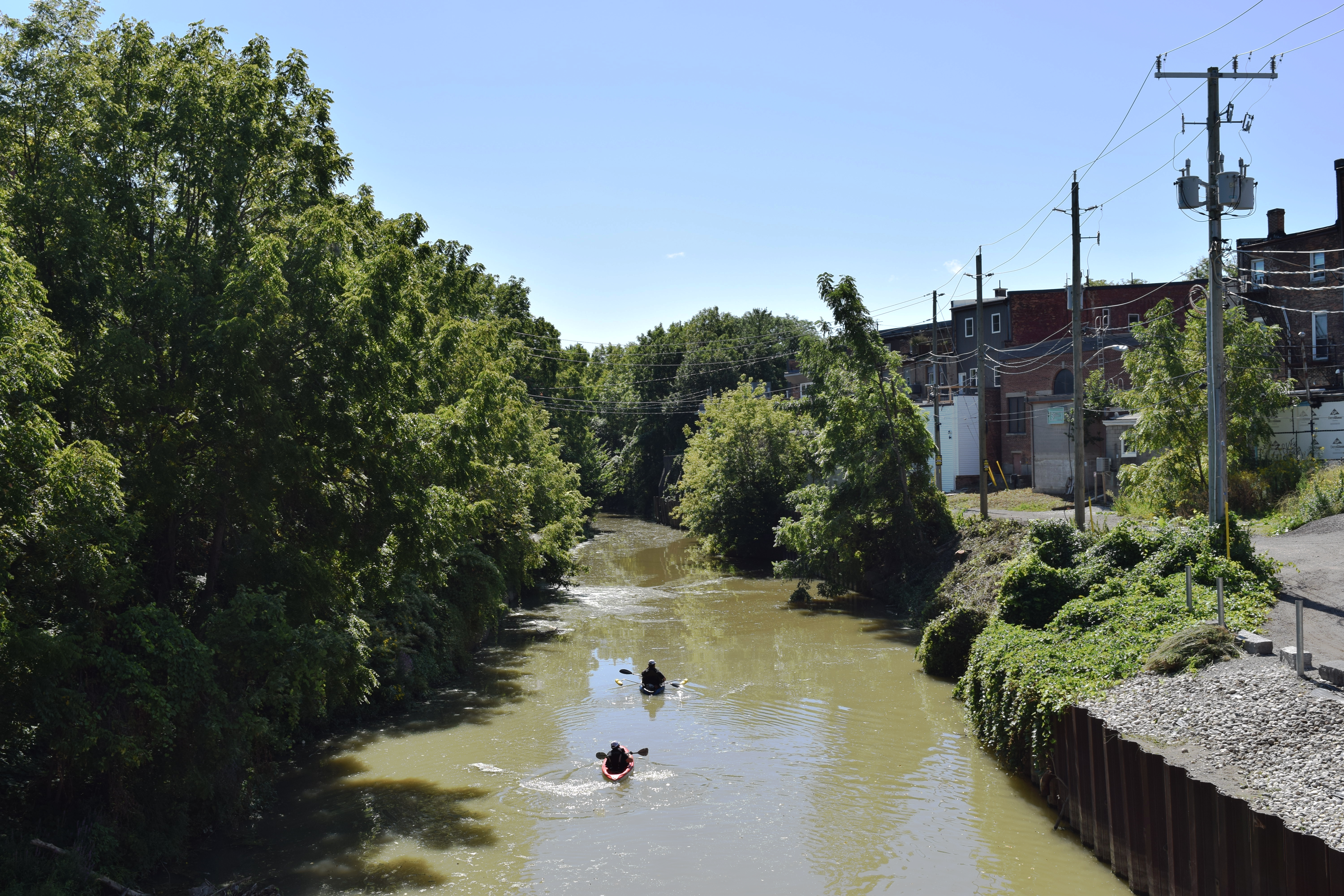
- McGregor's Creek looking southwest from the footbridge in downtown Chatham

- Location of the mouth of McGregor's Creek in Southern Ontario

Location
- Country: Canada
- Province: Ontario
- Region: Southwestern Ontario
- Municipality: Chatham-Kent

Physical characteristics
- Source: Unnamed field
  - coordinates: 42°26′18.6″N 81°55′38.2″W
  - elevation: 195 m (640 ft)
- Mouth: Thames River
  - location: Chatham
  - coordinates: 42°24′23.2″N 82°11′06.6″W
  - elevation: 177 m (581 ft)

Basin features
- River system: Great Lakes Basin

McGregor's Creek, officially McGregor Creek, is a stream in the municipality of Chatham-Kent in Southwestern Ontario, Canada. It is a tributary of the Thames River and is part of the Great Lakes Basin.

== Etymology ==
McGregor's Creek is likely named after one of two prominent local historical figures often conflated by local historians and both named John McGregor. The first, a merchant, was involved in the erection of a mill on the creek in 1801, which he later rented to the second, who served as a military captain and leader of the Kent Volunteers during the War of 1812. Both McGregor families remained prominent throughout Kent County's early history.

== Course ==
The creek begins in an unnamed field at an elevation of 195 metres (640 ft), approximately 3 kilometers west of the community of Ridgetown. It flows west, passes under Highway 401, turns southwest, then west again near the rural community of Kent Centre before flowing through Chatham and reaching its mouth at the Thames River in downtown Chatham. The Thames River flows via Lake St. Clair and the Detroit River to Lake Erie.
