= Joseph Storey =

Joseph William Storey
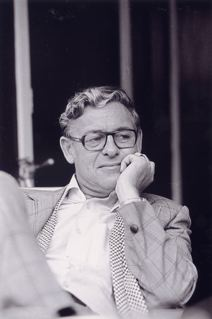
- Joseph William Storey
- Born: July 5, 1923; Windsor, Ontario, Canada
- Died: August 12, 1975 (aged 52); Rondeau Provincial Park, Ontario, Canada
- Education: University of Toronto School of Architecture
- Occupation: Architect
- Practice: Joseph W. Storey, Architect

Joseph William Storey (Note: Sometimes given as Joseph Wilfrid Storey) (July 5, 1923 – August 12, 1975) was an internationally renowned architect based in Chatham, Ontario, Canada. He graduated from the University of Toronto School of Architecture in 1947. He designed hundreds of unique homes, stores, offices, and public buildings, and many of his designs from the 1950s and 1960s are still strikingly modern today. His working career spanned three decades, in which time he was also a member of Chatham city council. His dedication to his community made the profession of architecture synonymous with that of civic leadership and public service. Storey died suddenly on his way to work in 1975 at the age of 52. The Joseph Storey Architectural Conservancy celebrates his many contributions to his home town every summer with a walking tour of homes he designed.

== Building a career ==
After graduation from the University of Toronto in 1946, (Note: CBC News article gives his year of graduation as 1947, and the year he founded his practice as 1948.) Storey worked for one year in Toronto in the office of John Lang Architect. (Note: some sources give the name of the firm as John Land Architect) After winning $750 in a Canada Mortgage and Housing Corporation competition, he returned to his hometown of Chatham, and at the age of twenty-four he established the practice of Joseph W. Storey, Architect in the fall of 1947. The reputation of the office was quickly established by Storey’s skilled translation of the functional clarity, simplicity, and elegant forms of modernism to the urban form of the then small town of Chatham.

As Chatham doubled in size over the next twenty-five years, many of its new buildings found their origins in the office of Joe Storey. Landmark buildings of Chatham such as the Ursuline Convent, Ursuline Motherhouse Chapel and Ursuline College (1958–1962) the head office of Union Gas (1965, major addition in 1973), the Kent County Courthouse (1949), the Chatham YMCA (1962), Kent County Municipal Building (1967), the Federal Post Office Building (1955), and the Chatham Civic Centre (1975) came from a close-knit dedicated core of talented people brought together by Storey. Bob Tyndall, Wally Stewart and Roger Duchene worked with Storey's firm from the early 1950s until Storey’s untimely passing in 1975. This team was joined by many other talented people through 1950s, 1960s and 1970s, such as architects and Ontario Association of Architecture members Douglas Hanley, Robert Steele, and James H. Jorden.

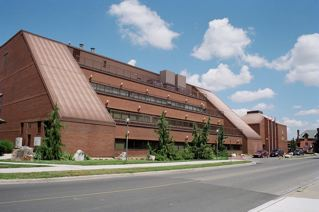
Chatham City Hall, 1975

Joe Storey worked on landmark buildings, but also to elementary and secondary schools, churches, band shells, senior citizen residences, industrial buildings, and to Storey’s favourite challenge, single family home. Scores of residences dot the neighbourhoods of Chatham. Examples of his work can also be found in Windsor (The Energy Conversion Plant, University of Windsor), London (Brescia University College), Sarnia (YMCA) and in many other small towns in southwestern Ontario.

Although Storey practiced architecture out of the spotlight of Toronto. His design for the Federal Post Office building (1955) featured the first use of curtain wall in Ontario. One of Storey’s more notable unbuilt projects of his career is his design for the conversion of four abandoned sugar beet silos on industrial lands into apartments. This idea and the search for investors carried over a number of years, but the search was unsuccessful and the silos were destroyed after Storey’s death.

== Ursuline College Chapel ==
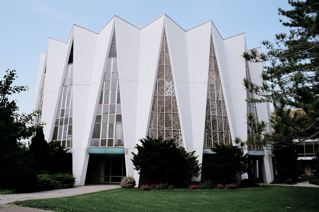
Ursuline Chapel, Chatham Ont.

The Ursuline Convent project began when Storey was thirty-two years old. It encompassed the designs for a major chapel, motherhouse, elementary and high school classrooms, and nursery school. Storey established a model here of translating the language of modernism to the traditional public and urban landscape of the small town. The architecture of the convent, known as The Pines integrated major works of art into the siting, the building, and their expressions. Storey maintained an excellent working relationship with the sisters of the Ursuline convent who were encouraging and adventurous clients, and subsequently recommended him highly to become the architect for a similar project for the Ursuline Religious Order in Lima, Peru. This project was prominently featured in both in the RAIC Journal and Progressive Architecture Magazine. The new buildings of the Pines in Chatham were sensitively sited with the nineteenth-century convent structures by making a series of connecting cloisters formed by both buildings and graceful covered walkways. This project has recently been identified by the Ontario branch of the international group for the Documentation and Conservation of the Modern Movement, to be included on a list of twenty-five examples of significant modern architecture in Ontario.

== Civic contribution ==
In addition to the very full schedule of his professional life, Storey was an active member of the local Rotary Club, and also served as member of the Chatham City Council in the years 1955-1958. During that tenure, he brought the Planning Act to Chatham and instituted the first Chatham Area Planning Board. Storey also served on the Ontario Association of Architects Council representing the St. Clair Region of several years. In the latter years of his practice, he turned his artistic talents to photography, and pioneered innovative photographic techniques in presentation and design stages of his work that is commonplace today.

== Death and descendants ==
Joseph Storey died suddenly on his way in to work from his summer cottage in Rondeau Provincial Park in 1975 at the age of 52. His career, although filled with uncountable achievements, was only in its middle stage, and the most mature years of his work were yet to come. The sudden loss of his professional skills and civic leadership was felt keenly. Joe Storey was married to Marjorie Sunnen Storey of Chatham (d. 2004) and is survived by his sons Tom Storey, principal of the planning firm of Storey Samways Planning Ltd., of Chatham, and Mark Storey, an environmental engineer in Vancouver, B.C., and daughters Charlotte Storey DuChene, a magazine editor and writer in the Kingston area, and architect Kim Storey, a partner in Brown and Storey Architects (Toronto) since 1981.
