= Economics of slavery in the United States =

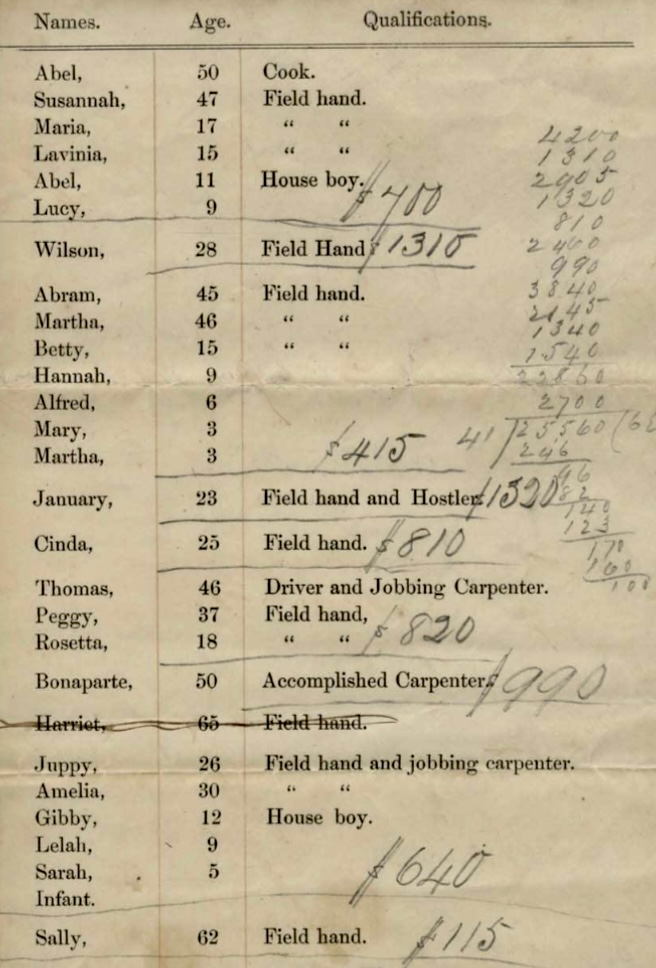
Prices noted in pencil on slave sale broadside with listing of names, ages and special skills; a note was made on an outer page "average $623.45"(Hutson Lee papers, South Carolina Historical Society via Lowcountry Digital Library)

Robert Fogel and Stanley Engerman, in their 1974 book Time on the Cross, argued that the rate of return of slavery at the market price was close to ten percent, a number close to investment in other assets. The transition from indentured servants to slaves is cited to show that slaves offered greater profits to their owners. A qualified consensus among economic historians and economists is that "Slave agriculture was efficient compared with free agriculture. Economies of scale, effective management, and intensive utilization of labor and capital made southern slave agriculture considerably more efficient than nonslave southern farming", and it is the near-universal consensus among economic historians and economists that slavery was not "a system irrationally kept in existence by plantation owners who failed to perceive or were indifferent to their best economic interests".

The relative price of slaves and indentured servants in the antebellum period did decrease. Indentured servants became more costly with the increase in the demand of skilled labor in England. At the same time, slaves were mostly supplied from within the United States and thus language was not a barrier, and the cost of transporting slaves from one state to another was relatively low. However, as in Brazil and Europe, slavery at its end in the United States tended to be concentrated in the poorest regions of the United States, with a qualified consensus among economists and economic historians concluding that the "modern period of the South's economic convergence to the level of the North only began in earnest when the institutional foundations of the southern regional labor market were undermined, largely by federal farm and labor legislation dating from the 1930s."

In the decades preceding the Civil War, the black population of the United States experienced a rapid natural increase. Unlike the trans-Saharan slave trade with Africa, the slave population transported by the Atlantic slave trade to the United States was sex-balanced. The slave population multiplied nearly fourfold between 1810 and 1860, despite the passage of the Act Prohibiting Importation of Slaves signed into law by President Thomas Jefferson in 1807 banning the international slave trade. Thus, it is also the universal consensus among modern economic historians and economists that slavery in the United States was not "economically moribund on the eve of the Civil War".

In the 2010s, several historians and sociologists, among them Edward E. Baptist, Sven Beckert, Walter Johnson, Calvin Schermerhorn, and Matthew Desmond have posited that slavery was integral in the development of American capitalism. Johnson wrote in River of Dark Dreams (2013): "The cords of credit and debt—of advance and obligation—that cinched the Atlantic economy together were anchored with the mutually defining values of land and slaves: without land and slaves, there was no credit, and without slaves, land itself was valueless. Promises made in the Mississippi Valley were backed by the value of slaves and fulfilled in their labor." Other economic historians have rejected that thesis. A 2023 study estimates that prior to the onset of the US Civil War, the enslaved population produced 12.6% of US national product.

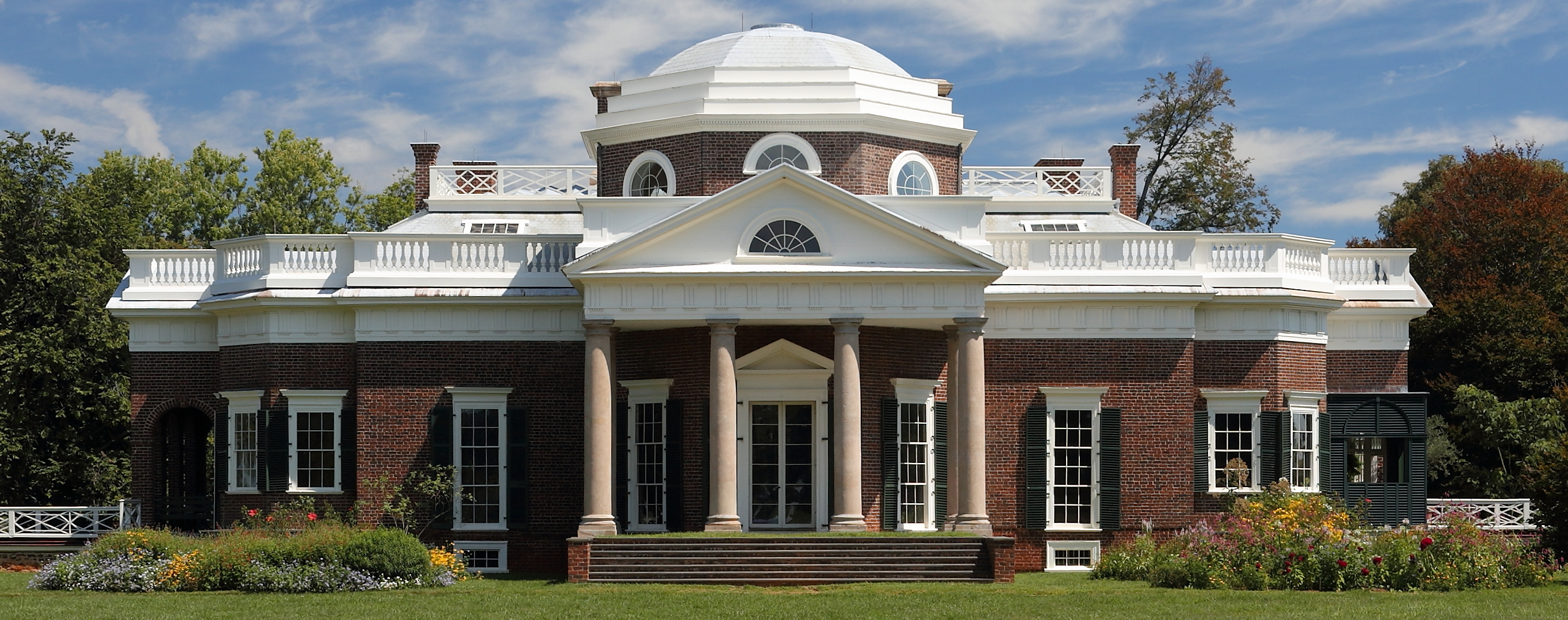
Plantations featuring the forced labor of large numbers of black slaves, such as Monticello owned by Thomas Jefferson, produced wealth for the white elite, the planter class.

Slavery had a long-lasting impact on wealth and racial inequality in the United States. Black families whose ancestors were freed before the start of the Civil War have had better socio-economic outcomes than families who were freed in the Civil War. The end of slavery has seen marginal change in the racial wealth gap. In 1863, two years prior to emancipation, black people owned 0.5 percent of the national wealth, while in 2019 it is just over 1.5 percent.

Those who economically gained the most from slavery were the planter class, owners of large-scale agricultural estates, plantations, where large numbers of enslaved Africans were held captive and forced to produce crops to create wealth for a white elite. Having a prominent role in politics with eight of the 15 presidents prior to Lincoln owning slaves while in office, upon the end of the Civil War the planter class kept control of their land and remained politically influential, with the London School of Economics stating, "this persistence in "de facto power" in turn allowed them to block economic reforms, disenfranchise black voters, and restrict the mobility of workers."

== Efficiency of slaves ==
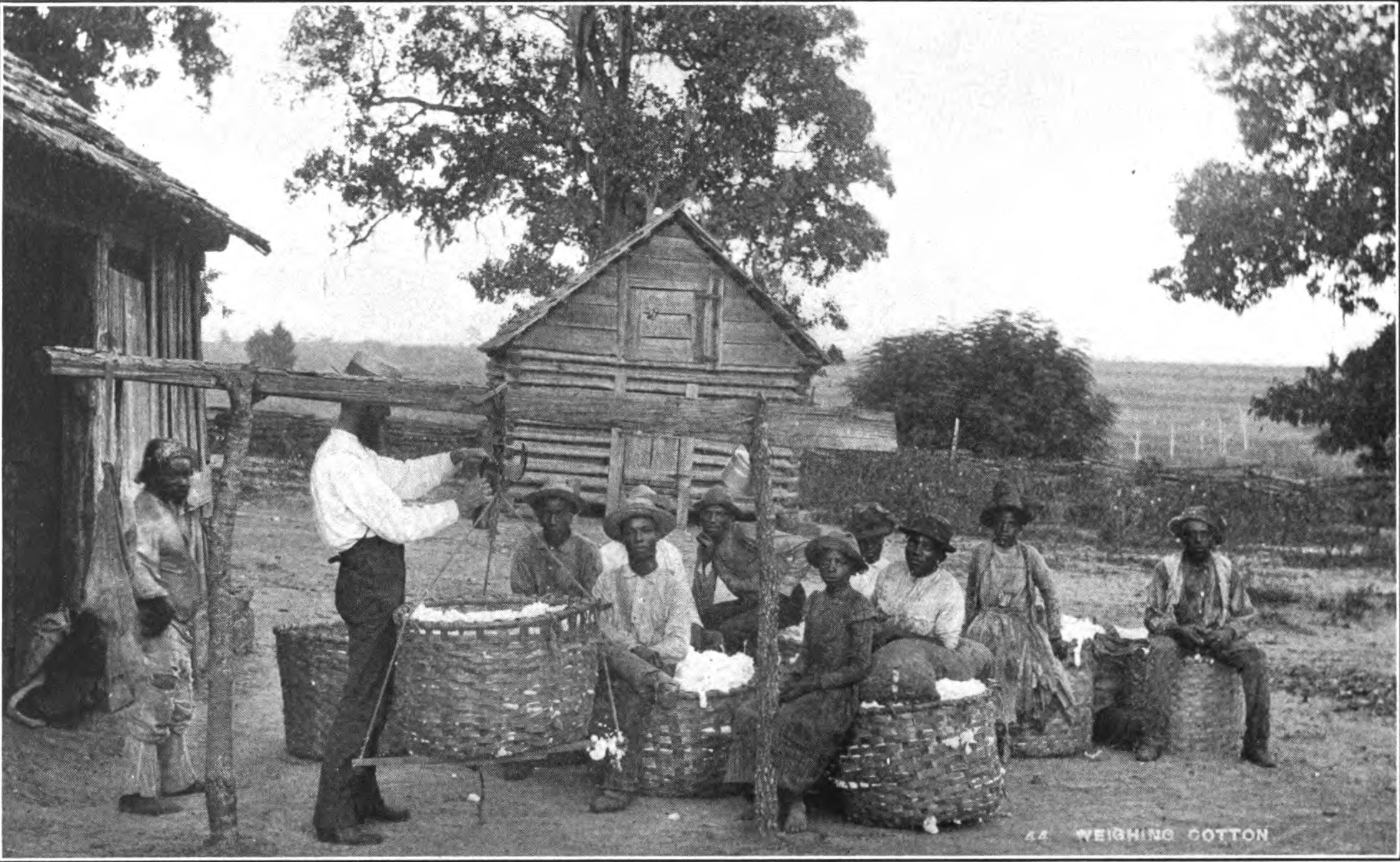
"Weighing cotton after the day's picking" c. 1908 in Monticello, Florida, with a black man in a sack used as the counterweight; when a New York reporter visited a cotton gin in South Carolina in 1851, the managers reported that it cost an average of $75 a year to staff the gin with black slaves, whereas it would have cost $116 to use free whites

Scholars disagree on how to quantify the efficiency of slavery. In Time on the Cross Fogel and Engerman equate efficiency to total factor productivity (TFP), the output per average unit of input on a farm. Using this measurement, Southern farms that enslaved black people using the gang system were 35% more efficient than Northern farms, which used free labor. Under the gang system, groups of slaves perform synchronized tasks under the constant vigilance of an overseer. Each group was like a part of a machine. If perceived to be working below his capacity, a slave could be punished. Fogel argues that this kind of negative enforcement was not frequent and that slaves and free laborers had a similar quality of life; however, there is controversy on this last point. A critique of Fogel and Engerman's view was published by Paul A. David in 1976.

In 1995, a random survey of 178 members of the Economic History Association sought to study the views of economists and economic historians on the debate. The study found that 72 percent of economists and 65 percent of economic historians would generally agree that "Slave agriculture was efficient compared with free agriculture. Economies of scale, effective management, and intensive utilization of labor and capital made southern slave agriculture considerably more efficient than nonslave southern farming." On the other hand, 58 percent of economic historians and 42 percent of economists disagreed with Fogel and Engerman's "proposition that the material (not psychological) conditions of the lives of slaves compared favorably with those of free industrial workers in the decades before the Civil War".

Eric Hilt noted that, while some historians have suggested slavery was necessary for the Industrial Revolution (on the grounds that American slave plantations produced most of the raw cotton for the British textiles market and the British textiles market was the vanguard of the Industrial Revolution), it is not clear if this is actually true; there is no evidence that cotton could not have been mass-produced by yeoman farmers rather than slave plantations if the latter had not existed (as their existence tended to force yeoman farmers into subsistence farming) and there is some evidence that they certainly could have. The soil and climate of the American South were excellent for growing cotton, so it is not unreasonable to postulate that farms without slaves could have produced substantial amounts of cotton; even if they did not produce as much as the plantations did, it could still have been enough to serve the demand of British producers. Similar arguments have been made by other historians.

== Prices of slaves ==
The U.S. has a capitalist economy so the price of slaves was determined by the law of supply and demand. For example, following bans on the import of slaves after the UK's Slave Trade Act 1807 and the American 1807 Act Prohibiting Importation of Slaves, the prices for slaves increased. The markets for the products produced by slaves also affected the price of slaves (e.g. the price of slaves fell when the price of cotton fell in 1840). Anticipation of slavery's abolition also influenced prices. During the Civil War the price for slave men in New Orleans dropped from $1,381 in 1861 to $1,116 by 1862 (the city was captured by U.S. forces in the Spring of 1862).

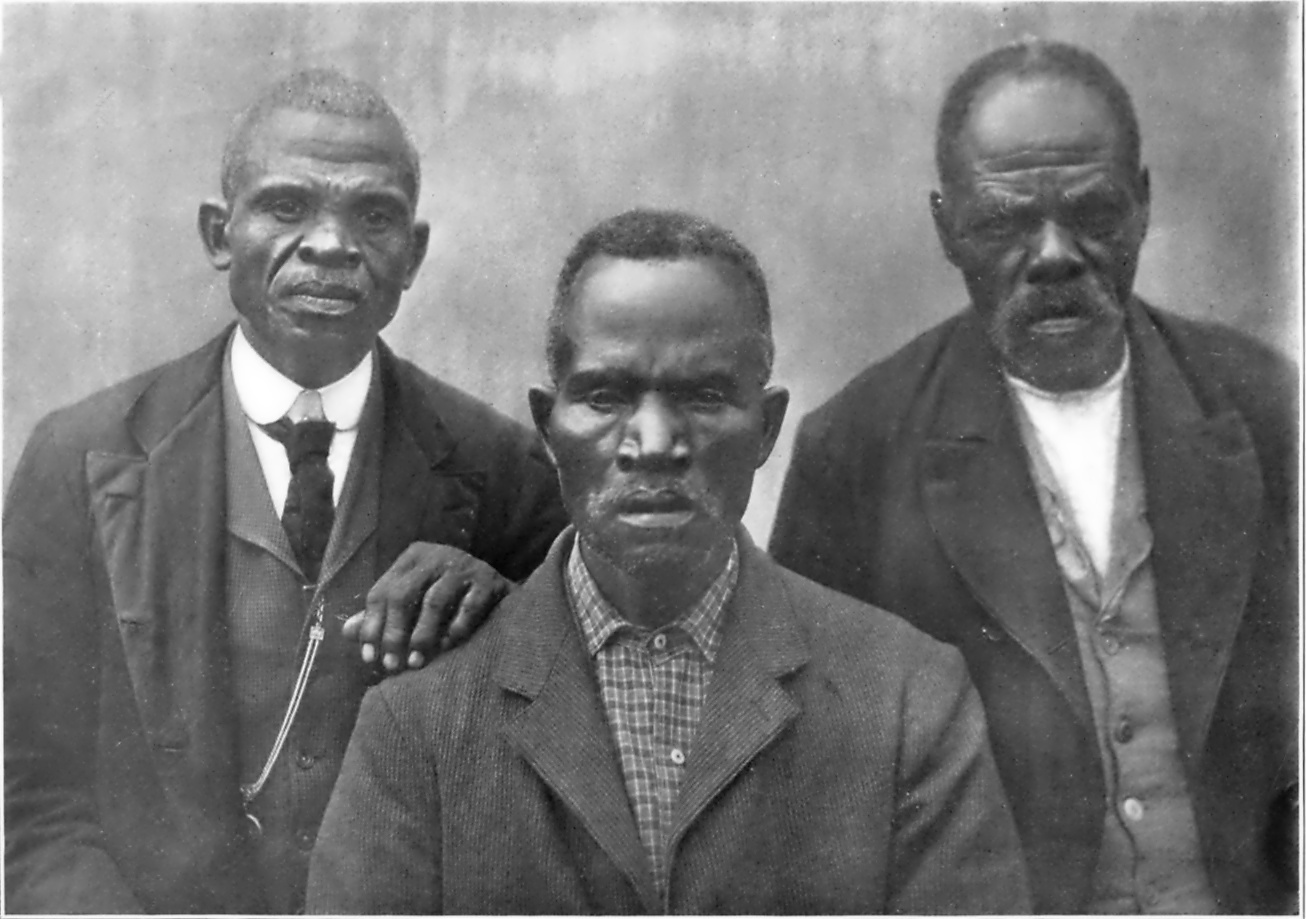
Survivors of the Wanderer: Ward Lee, Tucker Henderson, and Romeo—born Cilucängy, Pucka Gaeta, and Tahro in the Congo River basin—were purchased at a Portuguese-run African slave market in 1858 for an estimated US$50 (equivalent to $1,861 in 2025) each, and resold in the United States where the fair-market price for a healthy young enslaved male was easily US$1,000 (equivalent to $37,212 in 2025) (Charles J. Montgomery, American Anthropologist, 1908)

Controlling for inflation, prices of slaves rose dramatically in the six decades prior to the Civil War, reflecting demand due to commodity cotton, as well as use of slaves in shipping and manufacturing. Although the prices of slaves relative to indentured servants declined, both got more expensive. Cotton production was rising and relied on the use of slaves to yield high profits. Fogel and Engeman initially argued that if the Civil War had not happened, the slave prices would have increased even more, an average of more than fifty percent by 1890.

Prices reflected the characteristics of the slave; such factors as sex, age, nature, and height were all taken into account to determine the price of a slave. Over the life-cycle, the price of enslaved women was higher than their male counterparts up to puberty age, as they would likely bear children who their masters could sell as slaves and could be used as slave laborers. If slaves had a history of fights or escapes, their price was lowered reflecting what planters believed was risk of repeating such behavior. Slave traders and buyers would examine a slave's back for whipping scars; a large number of injuries would be seen as evidence of laziness or rebelliousness, rather than the previous master's brutality, and would lower the slave's price. Taller male slaves were priced at a higher level, as height was viewed as a proxy for fitness and productivity.

== Effects on Southern economic development ==
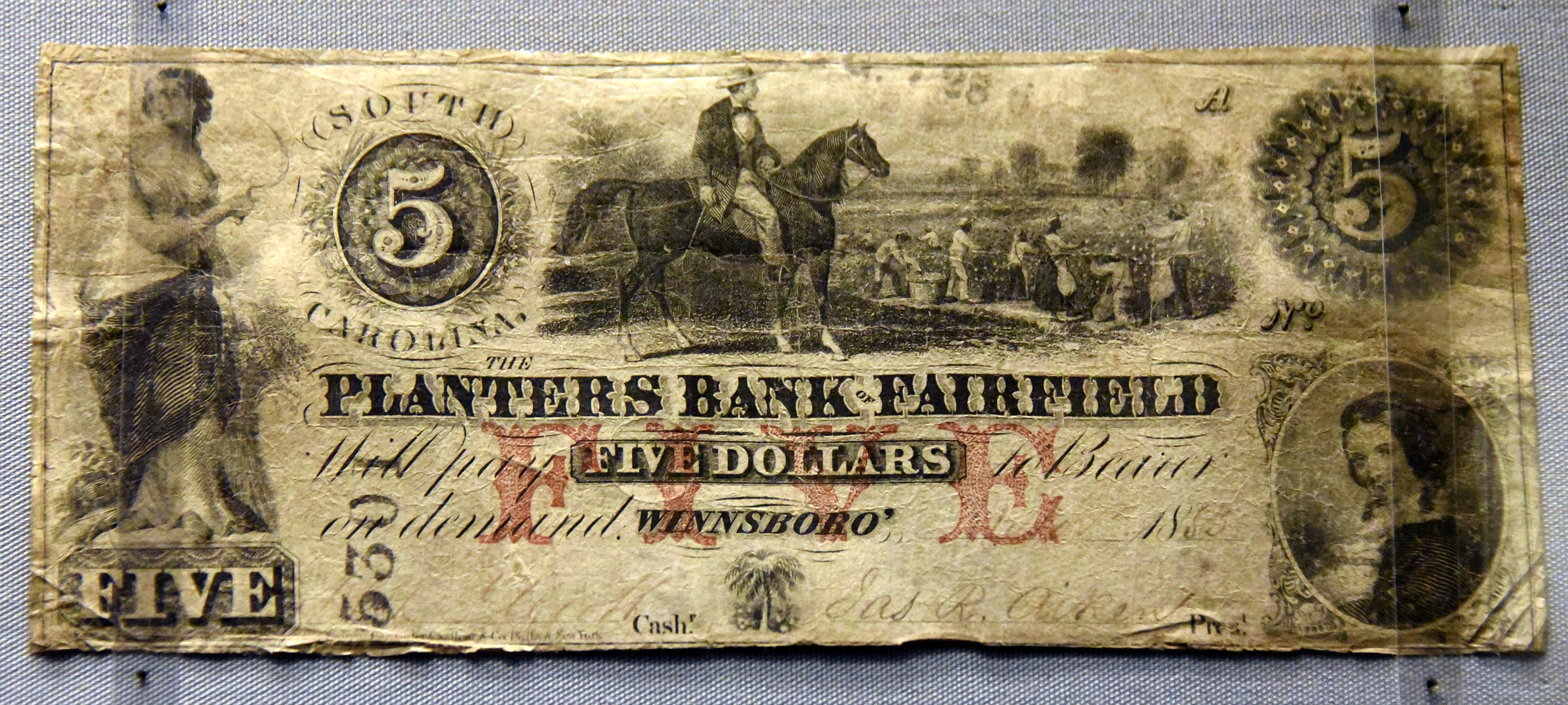
Five-dollar banknote showing a plantation scene with enslaved people in South Carolina. Issued by the Planters Bank, Winnsboro, 1853. On display at the British Museum in London.

While slavery brought profits in the short run, discussion continues on the economic benefits of slavery in the long run. In 1995, a random anonymous survey of 178 members of the Economic History Association found that out of the forty propositions about American economic history that were surveyed, the group of propositions most disputed by economic historians and economists were those about the postbellum economy of the American South (along with the Great Depression). The only exception was the proposition initially put forward by historian Gavin Wright that the "modern period of the South's economic convergence to the level of the North only began in earnest when the institutional foundations of the southern regional labor market were undermined, largely by federal farm and labor legislation dating from the 1930s." 62 percent of economists (24 percent with and 38 percent without provisos) and 73 percent of historians (23 percent with and 50 percent without provisos) agreed with this statement. Wright has also argued that the private investment of monetary resources in the cotton industry, among others, delayed development in the South of commercial and industrial institutions. There was little public investment in railroads or other infrastructure. Wright argues that agricultural technology was far more developed in the South, representing an economic advantage of the South over the North of the United States.

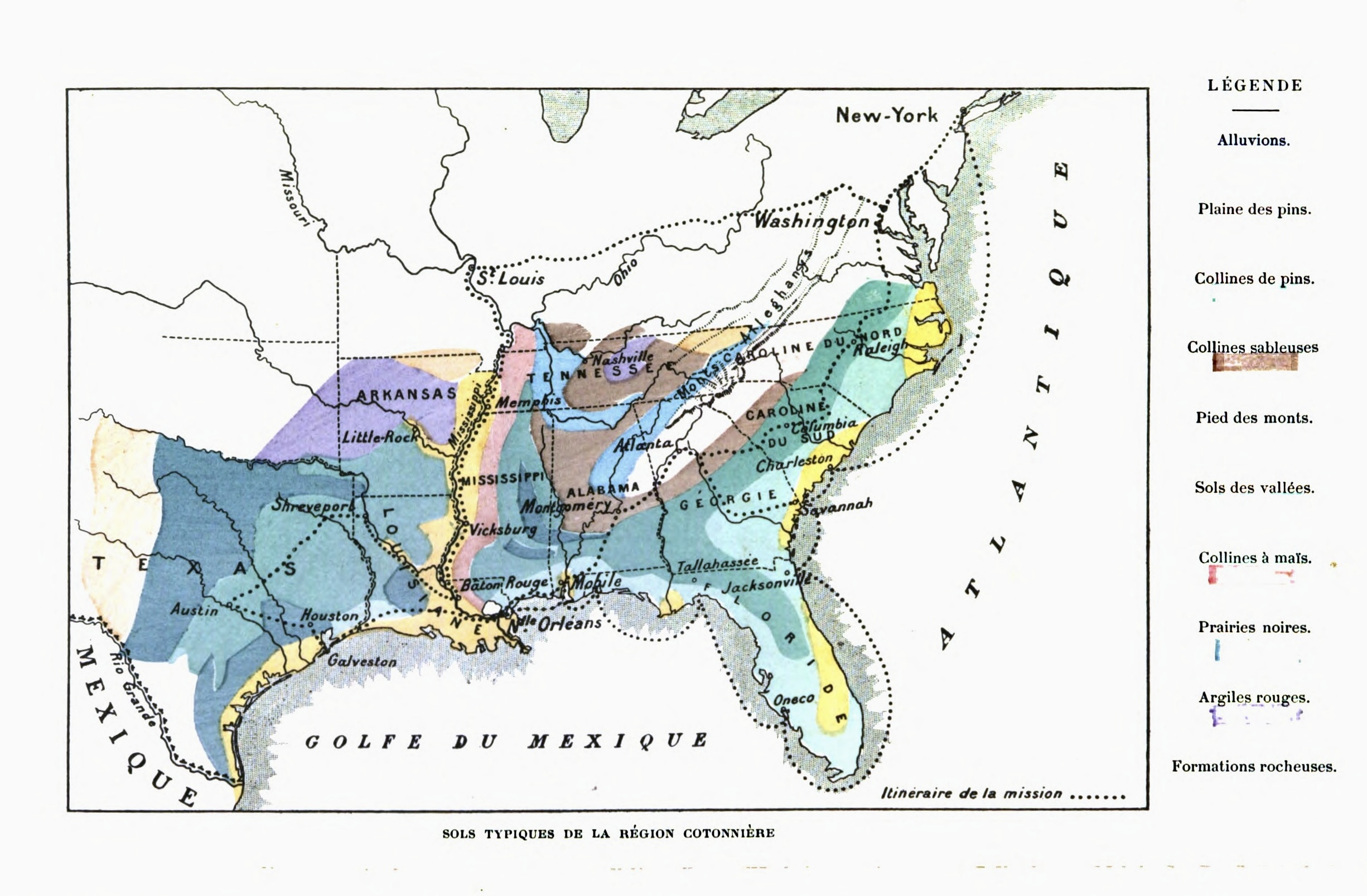
Soils of the cotton-growing regions of the United States

In Democracy in America, Alexis de Tocqueville noted that "the colonies in which there were no slaves became more populous and more rich than those in which slavery flourished". In 1857, in The Impending Crisis of the South: How to Meet It, Hinton Rowan Helper made the same point. Economists Peter H. Lindert and Jeffrey G. Williamson, in a pair of articles published in 2012 and 2013, found that, despite the American South initially having per capita income roughly double that of the North in 1774, incomes in the South had declined 27% by 1800 and continued to decline over the next four decades, while the economies in New England and the Mid-Atlantic states vastly expanded. By 1840, per capita income in the South was well behind the Northeast and the national average (Note: this is also true in the early 21st century).

Lindert and Williamson argue that this antebellum period is an example of what economists Daron Acemoglu, Simon Johnson, and James A. Robinson call "a reversal of fortune". In his essay "The Real History of Slavery", economist Thomas Sowell reiterated and augmented the observation made by de Tocqueville by comparing slavery in the United States to slavery in Brazil. He notes that slave societies reflected similar economic trends in those and other parts of the world, suggesting that the trend Lindert and Williamson identify may have continued until the American Civil War:

Both in Brazil and in the United States – the countries with the two largest slave populations in the Western Hemisphere – the end of slavery found the regions in which slaves had been concentrated poorer than other regions of these same countries. For the United States, a case could be made that this was due to the Civil War, which did so much damage to the South, but no such explanation would apply to Brazil, which fought no Civil War over this issue. Moreover, even in the United States, the South lagged behind the North in many ways even before the Civil War. Although slavery in Europe died out before it was abolished in the Western Hemisphere, as late as 1776 slavery had not yet died out all across the continent when Adam Smith wrote in The Wealth of Nations that it still existed in some eastern regions. But, even then, Eastern Europe was much poorer than Western Europe. The slavery of North Africa and the Middle East, over the centuries, took more slaves from sub-Saharan Africa than the Western Hemisphere did ... But these remained largely poor countries until the discovery and extraction of their vast oil deposits.

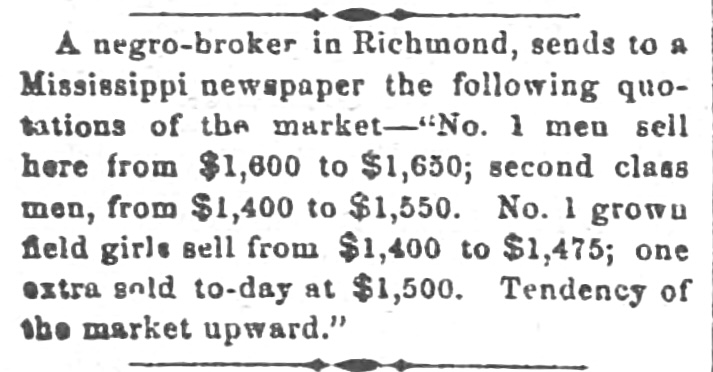
Market update, published on the eve of the American Civil War: Here the sell-side (Virginia) prepares the buy-side (Mississippi) for expected prices in the 1860–61 slave-trading season (The Wheeling Daily Intelligencer, August 11, 1860).

Sowell also notes in Ethnic America: A History, citing historians Clement Eaton and Eugene Genovese, that three-quarters of Southern white families owned no slaves at all. Most slaveholders lived on farms rather than plantations, and few plantations were as large as the fictional ones depicted in Gone with the Wind. In "The Real History of Slavery", Sowell also notes in comparison to slavery in the Arab world and the Middle East (where slaves were seldom used for productive purposes) and China (where the slaves consumed the entire output they created), Sowell observes that many commercial slaveowners in the antebellum South tended to be spendthrift and many lost their plantations due to creditor foreclosures, and in Britain, profits by British slave traders only amounted to two percent of British domestic investment at the height of the Atlantic slave trade in the 18th century. Sowell draws the following conclusion regarding the macroeconomic value of slavery:

In short, even though some individual slaveowners grew rich and some family fortunes were founded on the exploitation of slaves, that is very different from saying that the whole society, or even its non-slave population as a whole, was more economically advanced than it would have been in the absence of slavery. What this means is that, whether employed as domestic servants or producing crops or other goods, millions suffered exploitation and dehumanization for no higher purpose than the ... aggrandizement of slaveowners.

== Sexual economy of American slavery ==
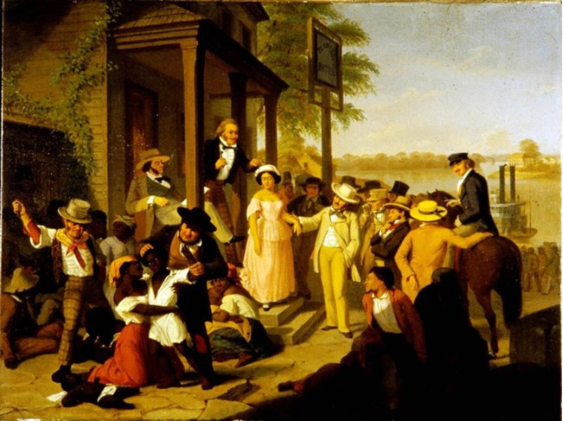
Slave Market, artist unknown, date unknown (Carnegie Museum of Art, Pittsburgh)

Scholar Adrienne Davis articulates how the economics of slavery also can be defined as a sexual economy, specifically focusing on how black women were expected to perform physical, sexual and reproductive labor to provide a consistent enslaved workforce and increase the profits of white slavers. Davis writes that black women were needed for their "sexual and reproductive labor to satisfy the economic, political, and personal interest of white men of the elite class" articulating that black women's reproductive capacity was important in the maintenance of the system of slavery due to its ability to perpetuate an enslaved workforce. She is also drawing attention to black women's labor being needed to maintain the aristocracy of a white ruling class, due to the intimate nature of reproduction and its potential for producing more enslaved peoples.

Due to the institution of partus sequitur ventrem, black women's wombs became the site where slavery was developed and transferred, meaning that black women were not only used for their physical labor, but for their sexual and reproductive labor as well.

"The rule that the children's status follows their mothers' was a foundational one for our economy. It converted enslaved women's reproductive capacity into market capital"

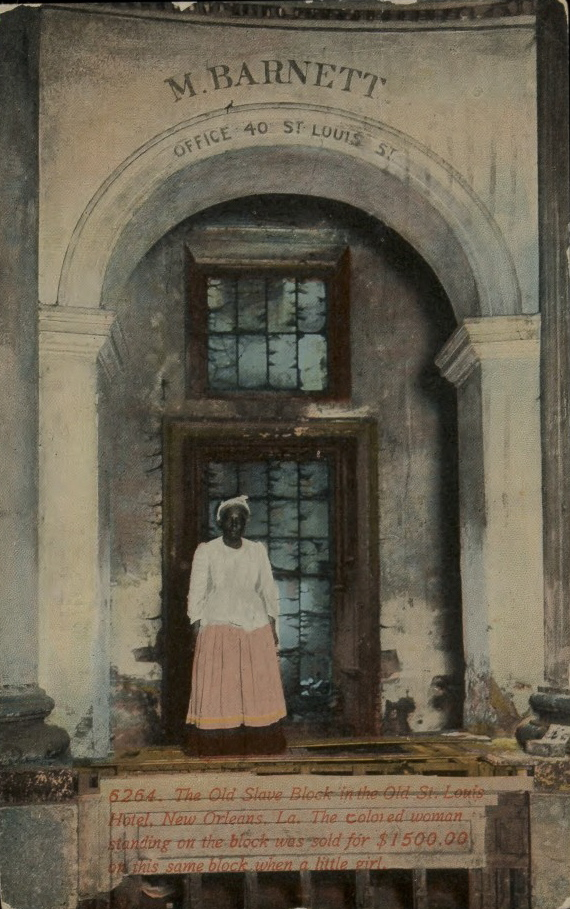
Divided-back era postcard: "The Old Slave Block in the Old St. Louis Hotel, New Orleans, La. The colored woman standing on the block was sold for $1500.00 on this same block when a little girl."

This articulation by Davis illustrates how black women's reproductive capacity was commodified under slavery, and that an analysis of the economic structures of slavery requires an acknowledgment of how pivotal black women's sexuality was in maintaining slavery's economic power. Davis writes how black women performed labor under slavery, writing: "[black women were] male when convenient and horrifically female when needed". The fluctuating expectations of black women's gendered labor under slavery disrupted the white normative roles that were assigned to white men and white women. This ungendering black women received under slavery contributed to the systemic dehumanization experienced by enslaved black women, as they were unable to receive the expectations or experiences of either gender within the white binary.

Davis's arguments address the fact that, under slavery, black women's sexuality became linked to the economic and public sphere, making their intimate lives into public institutions. Black women's physical labor was gendered as masculine under slavery when they were needed to yield more profit, but their reproductive capacities and sexual labor were equally as important in maintaining white power over black communities and perpetuating an enslaved workforce.
