= Alfred Schmitz Shadd =

Canadian educator, doctor, journalist, farmer, politician (1869-1915)

- Born: Alfred Schmitz Shadd c. 1869; Raleigh Township, Ontario, Canada
- Died: March 9, 1915; Winnipeg, Manitoba, Canada
- Resting place: Mount Pleasant Cemetery
- Education: University of Toronto (School of Medicine)
- Occupations: Educator; doctor; journalist; farmer; politician
- Spouse: Janet Stevenson Simpson (m. 1907)
- Children: 2
- Parent(s): Garrison William Shadd (father); Harriet Poindexter Shadd (mother)
- Relatives: Abraham Doras Shadd (grandfather); Mary Ann Shadd (aunt)

Alfred Schmitz Shadd (c. 1869 – March 9, 1915) was a Canadian educator, doctor, journalist, and politician. Born into a family of black abolitionists and activists, he is best known for being the first black doctor in the Prairies. He was the owner and editor of The Carrot River Journal, a weekly newspaper in Melfort, Saskatchewan, which he ran from 1908 to 1912. He died in 1915 of appendicitis.

== Early life ==
Alfred Schmitz Shadd was born in Raleigh Township, Ontario to his mother Harriet Poindexter Shadd in 1869 or 1870. His father, Garrison William Shadd, was a farmer. Shadd's grandfather was the African-American abolitionist Abraham Doras Shadd. His aunt, Mary Ann Shadd, was a lawyer, publisher, and anti-slavery activist. He was educated at a racially segregated school in Chatham.

== Education ==
Shadd enrolled into the University of Toronto to pursue a medical degree. While at the University of Toronto, he was a member of Trinity College. Within that duration of time, he had financial constraints which prevented him from completing his degree in 1896. Following that, he took up a role as a teacher at Carrot River Settlement in the Northwest Territories (present-day Kinistino, Saskatchewan) to gather funds. He made his way back to the University of Toronto medical school to complete his degree after a year spent teaching. In 1898, he graduated with honors in his medical degree.

== Career ==
Shadd became a teacher at the North Buxton School and Shreve School by 1891. By 1893, he had become the principal of the King Street School in Chatham. He returned to Carrot River Settlement after graduating in 1898, becoming the first black doctor in the Prairies. He would later move to Melfort, Saskatchewan. As a farmer, he was the pioneer of growing crab apple trees and mixed farming practices in his vicinity. In 1908, he purchased a newspaper in Prince Albert and moved it to Melfort, renaming it to The Carrot River Journal. Shadd served as the owner and editor until selling it in 1912.

== Family ==
On December 13, 1907 he married Jeanette Simpson, with whom he had two children, named Garrison and Louena.

== Politics ==
Shadd was a Conservative who contested and lost for the position of a territorial candidate in Kinistino in 1902. He contested again for Saskatchewan's first legislature under the Provincial Rights Party in 1905. He lost that contest as well by 52 votes. He would serve on the town council of Melfort.

== Electoral results ==
=== 1902 election ===
May 21, 1902 election
Name	Vote	%
William Frederick Meyers	425	62.32%
Alfred Schmitz Shadd	257	37.68%
Total Votes	682	100%

== Death ==
Shadd died on March 9, 1915 at the age of 45 following a surgery due to appendicitis. He is buried in the Mount Pleasant Cemetery in Melfort.

== Legacy ==
Shadd Drive and Shadd Street in Melfort are named for him.
