= Mount Pleasant Cemetery =

Mount Pleasant Cemetery may refer to:

== Canada ==
- Mount Pleasant Cemetery, Toronto, Ontario
- Mount Pleasant Group of Cemeteries, Ontario - operating 10 cemeteries in the Greater Toronto Area
- Mount Pleasant Cemetery, Melfort, Saskatchewan

== United States ==
- Mt. Pleasant Cemetery (Pine Rock, Illinois), one of Ogle County's cemeteries
- Mount Pleasant Cemetery (Bangor, Maine), Bangor, Maine
- Mount Pleasant Cemetery (Taunton, Massachusetts), listed on the National Register of Historic Places (NRHP)
- Mount Pleasant Cemetery (Newark, New Jersey), NRHP-listed
- Mount Pleasant Cemetery (Seattle)
- Mount Pleasant Cemetery (Sioux Falls, South Dakota), location of NRHP-listed Josephine Martin Glidden Memorial Chapel

== Elsewhere ==
- Mount Pleasant Cemetery, Singapore, cemetery in Novena, Singapore
