= AMT Theater =

Off-Broadway theatre building in New York City

- 45th Street Theatre, Davenport Theatre
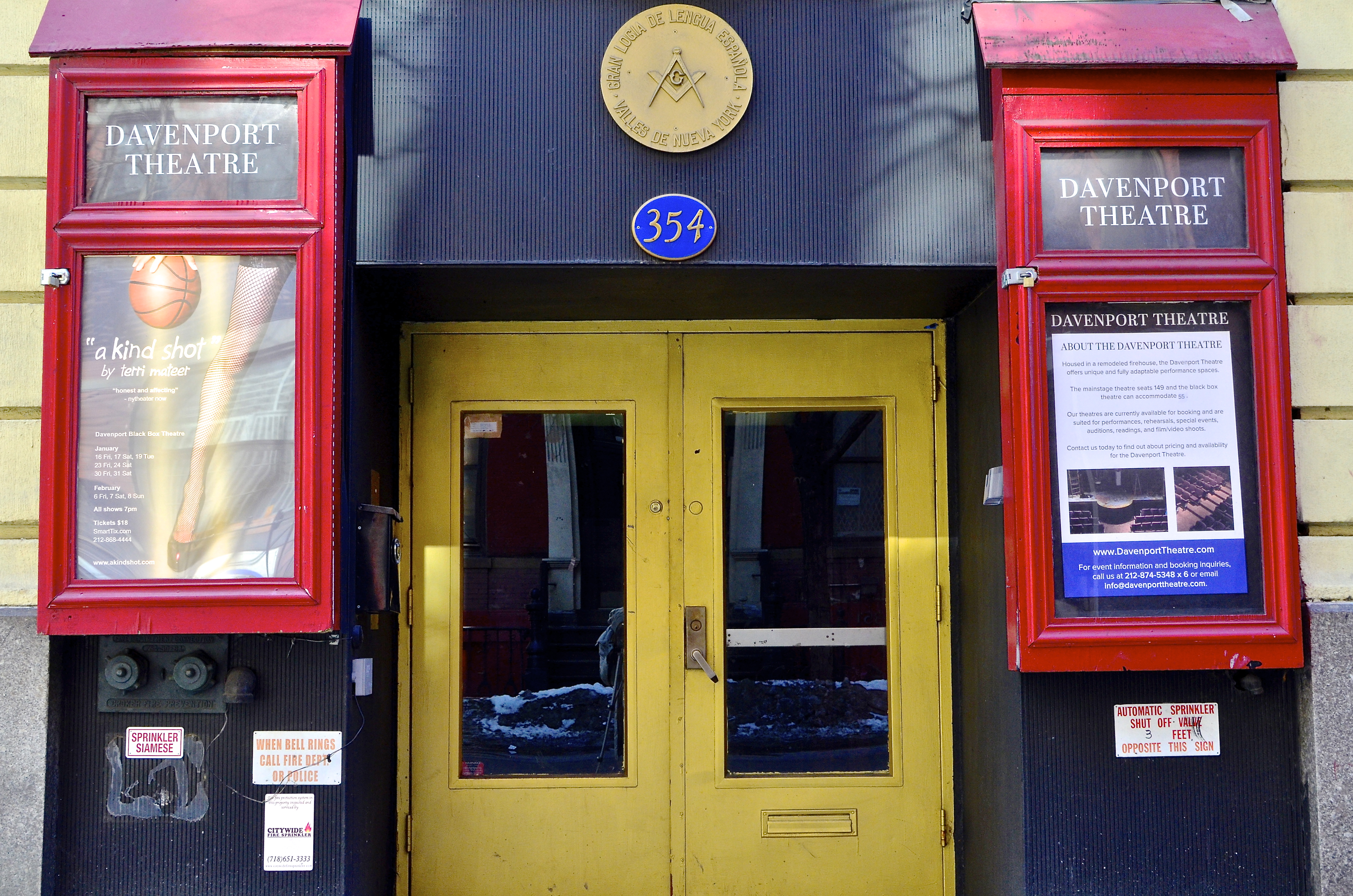
- Interactive map of AMT Theater
- Address: 354 West 45th Street; New York City; United States
- Coordinates: 40.760065°N 73.990536°W
- Type: Off-Broadway

Website
- https://www.amttheater.org/

The AMT Theater is an Off-Broadway theater venue located at 354 West 45th Street between Eighth and Ninth Avenues in the Hell's Kitchen neighborhood of Manhattan, New York City. It was previously called the 45th Street Theatre from 2007 to 2012 and the Davenport Theatre from 2014 to 2018, during which time it was leased by producer Ken Davenport renamed after his great-grandfather, Delbert Essex Davenport, a producer, publicist, and author in the early 1900s.

In 2019, the theater was converted to NYC Tango, a dance hall. Following the COVID-19 pandemic shutdown, the building reopened in 2022 as AMT Theater, named in honor of founding producer Al Tapper, with An Unbalanced Mind.

== Theatre history ==
- 1974–1985 – No Smoking Playhouse
- 1984–2004 – Primary Stages
- 2007–2012 – 45th Street Theatre (some overlap with Primary Stages)
- 2013 – New Theatre at 45th Street
- 2014–2018 – Davenport Theatre
- 2019–2022 – New York City Tango
- 2022–Present – AMT Theater (renovated and funded by Al Tapper)

== Building history ==
The five-story building was built in 1915 as an electric substation by the United Electric Light & Power Company which promoted alternating current in the war of the currents while New York Edison was promoting direct current. Although the direct current standard lost to AC in the war, Edison had continued to electrify lower Manhattan with direct current and accounted for 90 percent of the electric power at the time against United's 10 percent. The substation in particular was aimed at providing reliable power to Broadway theatres and Times Square signs at a time when most theatres had direct current. In 1928, New York Edison began the process to adopt the AC standard and by 1935 had totally acquired United.

After the building was decommissioned as a substation it became a Masonic Lodge. The masonic emblem with the inscription "Gran Logia de Lengua Española Vales De Nueva York" still hangs over the entrance and the abbreviation ALGDGADU is also above the entrance. The abbreviation is interpreted from Spanish "A La Gloria Del Gran Arquitecto Del Universo" to say "to the Glory of the Great Architect of the Universe."

According to the building's certificate of occupancy from 1959, the space was intended to be used as offices and a recording studio and had been used illegally as a theater space for several decades.

During its period as the Davenport Theatre from 2014 to 2018 there were two performances spaces, a 149-seat main stage on the ground floor and a 99-seat black box, which was renovated and renamed, The Loft at the Davenport Theatre on the third floor.

In 2019, the theater was converted to NYC Tango, a dance hall. Following the COVID-19 pandemic shutdown, the building reopened in 2022 as AMT Theater with An Unbalanced Mind.

== Productions ==
Selected productions at the theater.

Production	Opened	Closed
Popcorn Falls	October 8, 2019	Nov 25, 2018
Operation Crucible	October 31, 2018	
Once a Year on Blackpool Sands	September 4, 2018	September 10, 2018
Afterglow	July 24, 2017	TBD
Endangered!	July 10, 2017	TBD
Money Talks	July 10, 2017	September 30, 2017
Shear Madness	July 15, 2016	April 23, 2017
Daddy Long Legs	September 28, 2015	June 6, 2016
Release the Kraken! (aka The RATCHET Play) - The Remix	April 16, 2015	April 26, 2015
Men and Women Talking Love and Sex	December 5, 2014	February 14, 2015
Pageant	July 14, 2014	October 26, 2014
Forbidden Broadway Comes Out Swinging!	May 4, 2014	July 20, 2014
Around the World in 80 Days (as the New Theater)	June 4, 2013	October 13, 2013
Wanda's World (as the 45th Street Theatre)	January 23, 2008	February 10, 2008
Idol: The Musical (as the 45th Street Theatre)	August 12, 2007	August 12, 2007
Jayson (as the 45th Street Theatre)	July 10, 1998	August 16, 1998
Golden Boy (as the 45th Street Theatre)	November 19, 1995	December 16, 1995
We'll Meet Again (as the 45th Street Theatre)	July 27, 1995	October 1, 1995
Awake and Sing! (as the 45th Street Theatre)	July 6, 1993	July 25, 1993
The Brooklyn Trojan Women (as the 45th Street Theatre)	June 1, 1993	June 30, 1993
