= Isaac Shadd =

American newspaper publisher and politician

Isaac D. Shadd
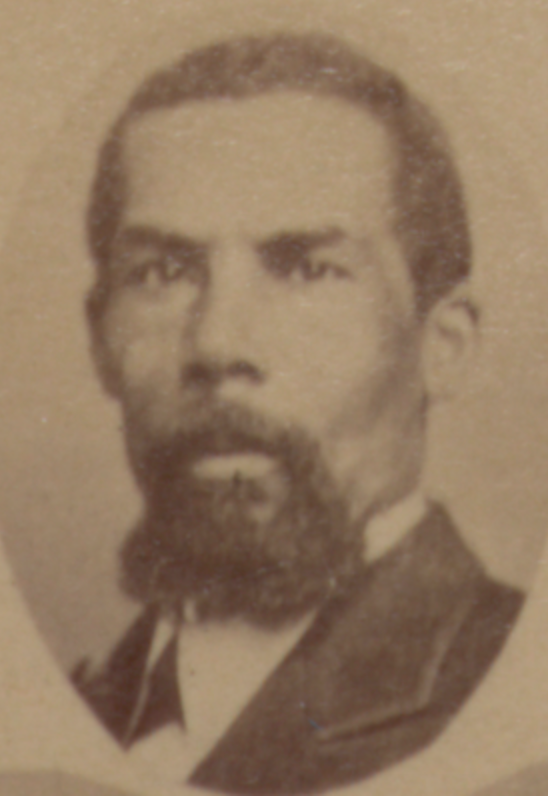
- Born: 1829; Delaware
- Died: March 15, 1896 (aged 66–67); Greenville, Mississippi
- Occupations: Publisher and politician
- Spouse: Amelia Freeman Shadd
- Parent(s): Abraham D. Shadd (father); Harriet Burton Parnell Shadd (mother)
- Relatives: Mary Ann Shadd Cary (sister); Eunice P. Shadd (sister)

Isaac D. Shadd (1829 – March 15, 1896) was a newspaper publisher, printer, politician, and bookkeeper. Before the American Civil War, he and his sister Mary Ann Shadd moved to Chatham, Ontario, and published the anti-slavery newspaper, The Provincial Freeman. He and his wife taught at the Chatham Mission School. He was involved in the planning of the John Brown's raid on Harpers Ferry and led the Chatham Vigilance Committee to rescue Sylvanus Demarest in 1858. He returned to the United States and served as a member of the Mississippi House of Representatives during the Reconstruction era from 1871 until 1876. From 1874 to 1875, he was the Speaker of the House.

== Early life ==
Shadd was born in Delaware in 1829. (Note: His obituary erroneously states that he was born in Pennsylvania in 1835. He was born in Delaware and raised in Pennsylvania. From the 1850 census, Isaac was born in 1829 or 1830. He was the oldest of the siblings at home. Both Isaac and Amelia were born in Delaware. The rest of the children – Joseph, Sinclair, Emeline, Garrison, Sarah, Ada, Abraham, Eunice, and Sarah – were born in Pennsylvania. Harriet (49) was born in North Carolina, as was a woman old enough to be her mother, Mary Burton (70).) He was raised Catholic as one of thirteen children of Harriet Burton Parnell and Abraham D. Shadd, both of whom were abolitionists. His father was born in Wilmington, Delaware, the paternal great-grandson of a Hessian soldier and a free black woman, Mrs. Elizabeth Jackson. (Note: Isaac was the paternal great-grandson of Hans Schad, a Hessian military officer who fought for the British during the American Revolutionary War. Mrs. Elizabeth Jackson, a free black woman, cared for him after he was seriously injured at Chad's Ford in Pennsylvania. The British promised to pay her for caring for him, but he had fallen in love and married, Mrs. Jackson's daughter, also named Elizabeth, so the British did not pay her. Their son, Shadd's paternal grandparents, were Jeremiah and Amelia Shadd, who had twelve children. The tenth was Abraham D. Shadd.) Abraham was a board member of the American Anti-Slavery Society and an agent for The Emancipator that was produced by the society. He was the president of the society at the Third Annual Convention of the Negro People held from June 3 to June 13, 1833.

Black children were not allowed to attend school in Delaware, so in 1833 Abraham moved the family five miles over the border to West Chester, Pennsylvania, in 1833. The children studied in a Quaker school. Both Abraham and Harriet Shadd's houses in Delaware and Pennsylvania were stations on the Underground Railroad. Shadd lived at his parents' house in West Chester in 1850.

Shadd and his sister Mary Ann moved to Ontario, Canada, around the time that the Fugitive Slave Act of 1850 (September 18, 1850) was enacted that made it easier for slave takers to take runaway and free people into slavery from northern states. Mary Ann had written a pamphlet, A Plea for Emigration, or Notes on Canada West in Its Moral, Social and Political Aspect, that informed free and enslaved blacks of the benefits of moving to Canada for freedom. Abraham moved his family in 1853 to Canada West (Ontario after confederation in 1867). Abraham was a landowner, politician, activist, and a farmer. Abraham died on February 11, 1882, and was buried in Maple Leaf Cemetery.

== Marriage and child ==
Shadd married Amelia Freeman, who was born free in Pittsburgh, Pennsylvania, around 1833. (Note: Some sources state that she was born in Ohio, but her Oberlin records state that she was from Pittsburg.) She went to Ohio to study in the Ladies' Preparatory department of Oberlin College by 1849. (Note: It is not clear if she graduated or not. One of her instructors was Rev. Charles Avery.) In the 1850s, she taught art and music at Avery College in Pittsburg and the Allegheny Institute. She attended the National Emigration Convention in Cleveland, Ohio, in 1854.

Familiar with her teaching skills, Freeman was encouraged to move to Chatham by William Still, William King, and Martin R. Delany to establish the Chatham Mission School. She arrived in Chatham in 1856 and the school opened in 1859. It offered classic courses, including philosophy and music. The school received donations and held fundraisers, but it was difficult to keep the school solvent. Sometimes, Amelia taught in public schools to earn enough money to keep the school open. She provided private music, art, and embroidery classes. She also organized a number of religious, lecture and literary events for the community and contributed to The Provincial Freeman. In 1857, she was a temporary editor for the paper.

Shadd met Amelia in Ontario between 1854 and 1857 and they were married by 1861. Shadd had a son, Charlton, who is believed to have been Isaac's son from an earlier relationship or was adopted; He was born about 1854, before Shadd and Amelia met. Charlton entered politics in Greenville, Mississippi.

== Career ==
=== Ontario, Canada ===
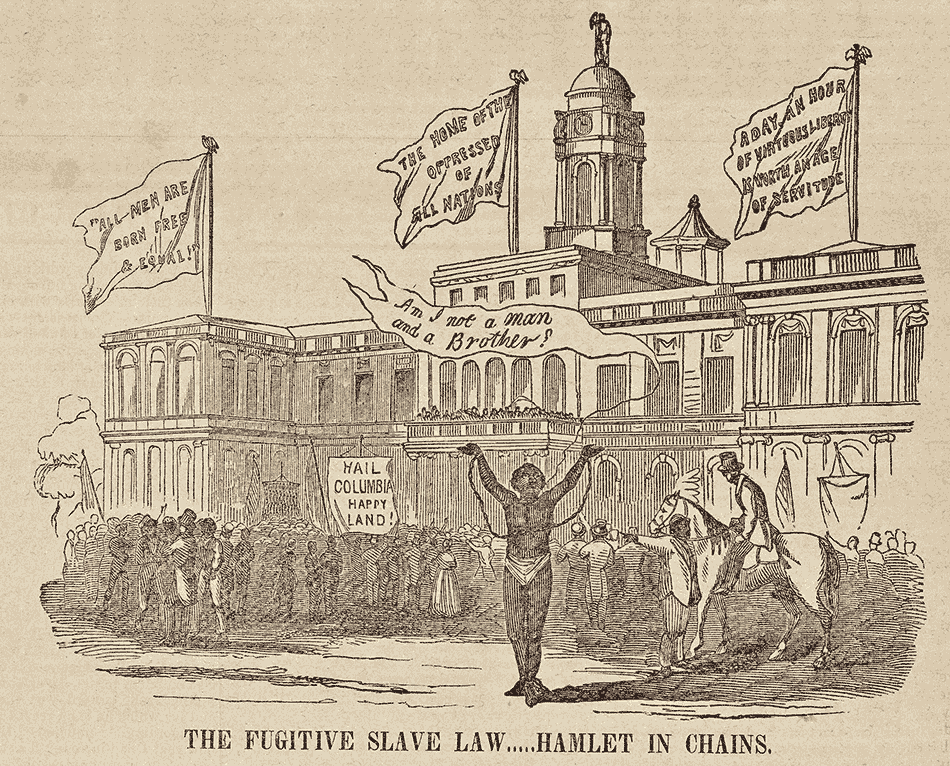
James Hamlet, captured under Fugitive Slave Act of 1850

Isaac and Mary Ann Shadd ran The Provincial Freeman in Chatham, Ontario. (Note: Mary Ann Shadd taught school in windsor, Ontario, before moving to Chatham.) He and his wife worked at the Chatham Mission School, which was established in 1859. By 1864, there were 259 day and evening students at the school by 1864. Amelia was assisted by Mary Ann Shad Carr, her stepdaughter Ann Cary, and Sarah M. Shadd.

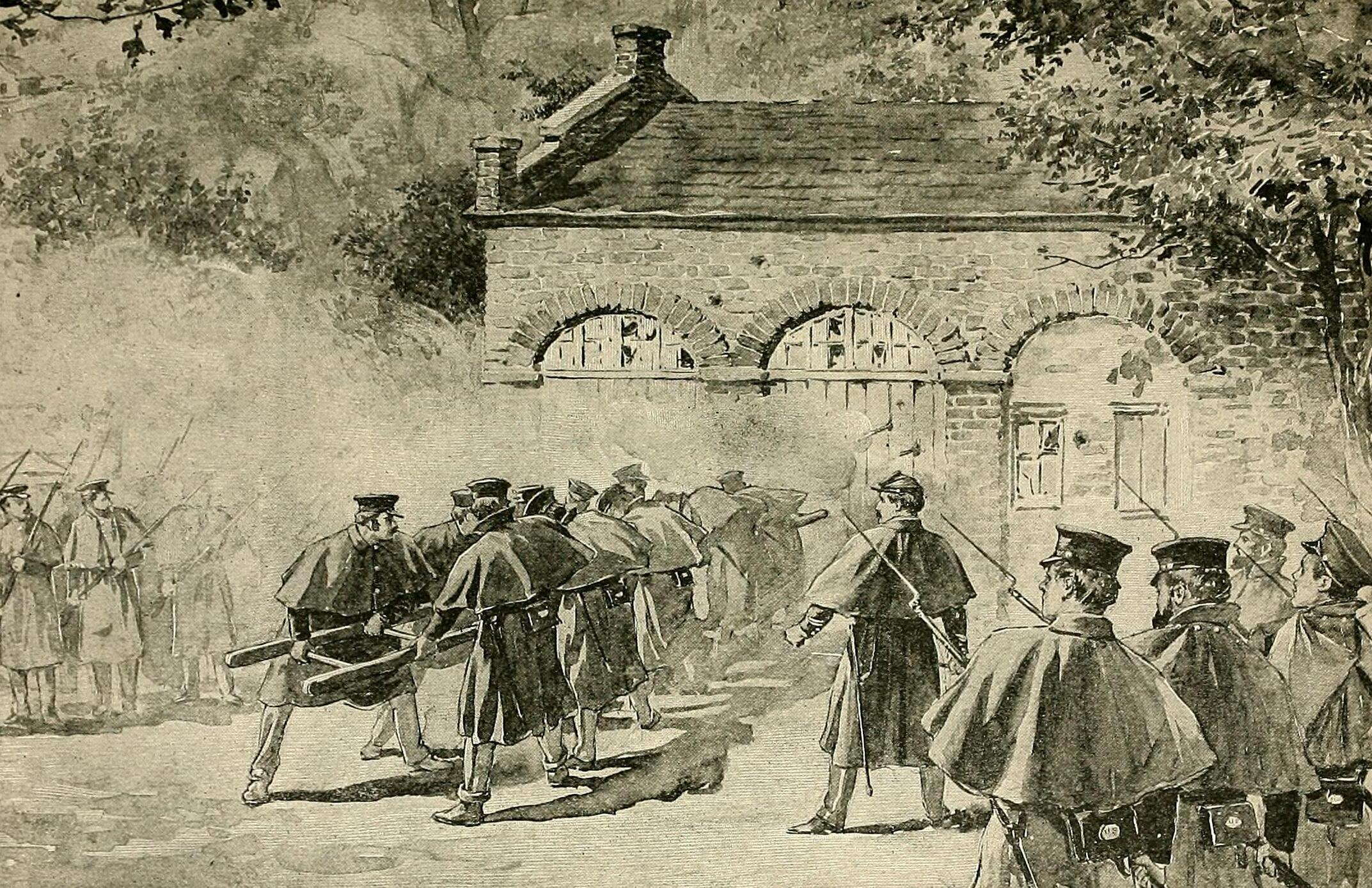
U.S. Marines attacking John Brown's makeshift fort during his raid on Harper's Ferry

Shadd hosted a convention for John Brown in 1858 and he became the secretary of Brown's League of Liberty. There were a series of secret meetings held at the First Baptist Church in Chatham. He planned an insurrection that would do away with slavery. Brown came to Canada to recruit blacks who would participate in John Brown's raid on Harpers Ferry in 1859, an incident that led to Brown's execution and was part of the build up to the American Civil War.

Shadd and his sister Mary were both members of the Chatham Vigilance Committee that sought to prevent former slaves from being returned to the United States and brought back into slavery, such as the case of Sylvanus Demarest.

=== Back to the United States ===
In the late 1850s, Shadd considered emigrating to the Niger Valley in Africa. Shadd moved his family back to the United States and they lived in Davis Bend, Mississippi by 1870. He worked as a bookkeeper for Benjamin T. Montgomery. He moved to Vicksburg, Mississippi, where in 1871 he was elected to the Mississippi House of Representatives. He served until 1876. From 1874 to 1875, he was the Speaker of the House, the seat previously held by John R. Lynch. He founded and was president of the Shadd Training College beginning in 1875. It was a training and industrial school for more than a hundred black students.

He and Amelia moved to Greenville, Mississippi by 1879 and he was on the board of alderman for the city of Greenville. He was appointed route agent for the United States Postal Service between Vicksburg and Memphis in 1883, a position that he held until 1885. Between 1886 and 1889, Shadd edited the Greenville Herald.

When the Shadds lived in Mississippi, Amelia taught with support from the Board of Missions to the Freedmen and then in public schools. She was a principal in two schools in Vicksburg.

He was a Grand Master of a masonic order. (Note: Order of F. and A. A. Y. for the state, which according to the List of Masonic abbreviations may mean: Order of the Free and Ancient Accepted, for all but the Y.) Shadd died on March 15, 1896, in Greenville, Mississippi. It is not known when Amelia died, she was last known to be alive in 1886.
