= Chatham Vigilance Committee =

Canadian abolitionist organization

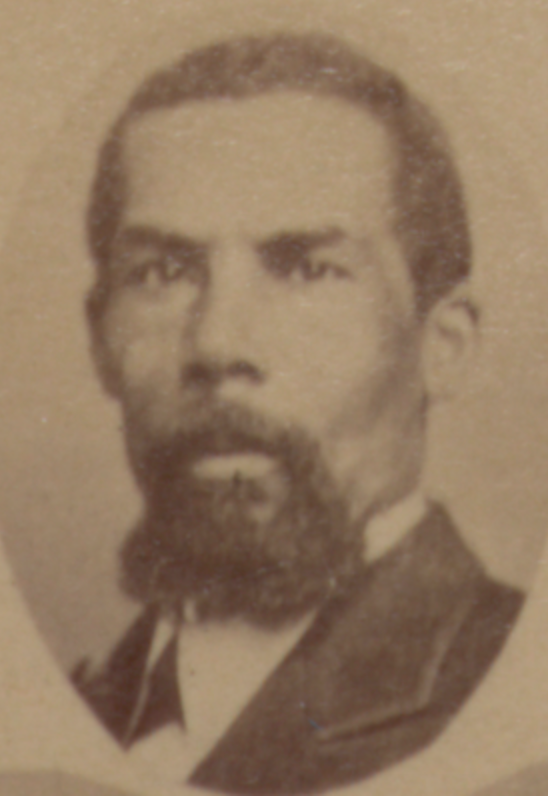
Isaac D. Shadd, a notable member of

The Chatham Vigilance Committee was formulated before the American Civil War by black abolitionists in the Chatham, Ontario area to save people from being sold into slavery. Some of the members of the group were graduates of Oberlin College in Ohio. It is most well known for its rescue of Sylvanus Demarest, but the Committee rescued other people.

== Background ==
The largest waves of African Americans seeking freedom in Canada began in 1841 and continued through to 1865. Thousands came to and through Chatham. Emancipation Day, enacted in 1833, was a day when people could celebrate their freedom. A deep community spirit, called "True Bands", meant that people would look after each other and build up schools, churches, and other resources to support one another. Chatham had become the center for black activism in Canada, partly due to The Provincial Freeman newspaper.

The group was founded following the passage of the Fugitive Slave Act of 1850, which made it easier for former slaves living in Free states to be returned to slavery. As a result, as many as 20,000 blacks moved to Canada between 1850 and 1860, making a total of 60,000 black citizens in the country. Between 1850 and 1865, there were 25,000 black residents in Chatham, Ontario.

American slave-hunters came into Canada to find fugitive enslaved people. At times, they took blacks to sell into slavery, such as if they could not find the person that they were looking for. Vigilance committees were organized by black men and women in southwestern Ontario to counter American slave catchers.

== Members ==
Members of the organization included Lucy Stanton Day, James Henry Harris, G. W. Brodie, Ann Shadd Cary, Thomas Cary, Isaac Shadd, William Howard Day, Martin Delany, Osborne Perry Anderson, John James Pleasant, and Mary Ellen Pleasant.

== Sylvanus Demarest ==
Members of the Chatham community were notified in September 1858 that a white man was traveling with a black boy through Canada and to Detroit, Michigan. W. R. Merwin transported a 10-year-old boy Sylvanus Demarest on a train from London, Ontario, to Detroit, Michigan, in the United States. He was also known as Venus.

The fear was that Demarest was being kidnapped from Canada and into slavery in the United States. When they initially boarded the train, Merwin stated that Demarest was his slave. Elijah Leonard, who had been the mayor of London, Ontario, spotted the two travelers and had a telegraph sent ahead to Chatham. The train, making its scheduled stop for water in Chatham, was met by 100 people (Note: Contemporary newspapers stated that there were 300 to 400 people who came to the train station for Demarest and that Demarest did not want to leave the train.) who entered the train and removed Demarest. Some of the people were armed.

Isaac Shadd, publisher of The Provincial Freeman and leader of the Chatham Vigilance Committee, led the rescue and was arrested in 1858 for his role. Another four blacks and two whites, who were also members of the committee, were arrested as well. They were charged by railroad officials for having caused a riot and "(indirectly) abduction". They were found guilty of rioting. Some of the people were able to pay assigned fines, and others were unable to do so and remained in jail for some time. It is also said that the case was dismissed when it was learned that Demarest was not a fugitive slave.

The Chicago Tribune reported that Merwin was his slaveholder from St. Louis, but it was found that Merwin had intended on selling Demarest, and he had never owned him. Demarest was found to have been born free. Even so, there were some white Canadians that were outraged about how the train was stormed to find Demarest.

After the event, he met up with his mother in Chatham and lived with the Isaac and Amelia Shadd before moving to Windsor.

== John Price ==
At about the same time, slave catchers had taken John Price, a former slave and resident of Oberlin, Ohio. Residents of his community, including Oberlin College faculty and students, liberated him in what was called the Oberlin–Wellington Rescue.

== Popular culture ==
- The Journey of Little Charlie (2018), from the Buxton Chronicles series, volume 3 by Christopher Paul Curtis is a historical fiction set in 1858 with Sylvanus Demarest as one of the characters.
