= Sattira Douglas =

19th-century American abolitionist

Sattira 'Sattie' Douglas (c. 1840 – ?) was an American abolitionist and educator. An African American organizer, she helped form and lead multiple committees and clubs in Chicago and the West. Douglas traveled to Kansas near the end of the American Civil War, where she took up teaching freedmen and women, who had recently escaped slavery.

== Early and personal life ==
Douglas was born in 1840 to free African Americans Alfred and Maria Steele, whose middle-class status enabled them to give her a good education. teenager Douglas showed early interest in abolitionism and would collect the Canadian newspaper, The Provincial Freeman, which was edited by Mary Ann Shadd and abolitionist H. Ford Douglas, who she eventually married in 1857. The two would remain married until his death in 1865 from malaria.

== Civil War ==
Douglas was a staunch supporter of black participation for the North in the Civil War and her husband H. Ford served in the 95th Illinois Regiment. She frequently wrote to newspapers such as the Christian Recorder and Weekly Anglo-African, arguing that the Civil War could advance equal rights and that a lack of participation would "prove the correctness of the aspersion indulged in by our enemies, that we are unworthy of those rights which they have so long withheld from us." Douglas also traveled with fellow abolitionists and Civil War proponents Mary Ann Shadd and Frances Harper, among others, to encourage enlistment and to also raise funds for black Canadian settlements.

Douglas was a key organizer and founder of the Colored Soldier's Aid Society of Chicago and was the secretary of the Colored Ladies Freedmen's Aid Society of Chicago. Douglas was noted as being treasurer and helping to secure financial aid for the CFLAS. With the help of the CFLAS, she was able to depart to teach in Kansas in 1864.

== Life In Kansas ==
In Kansas, Douglas was a school teacher, teaching freed slaves of the area, who were referred to as "contrabands". She would send back reports of her work to the Weekly Anglo-African and continued to work closely with the CFLAS to provide aid to the freed people.

== See also ==
- Charles Henry Langston
