= Provincial Freeman (newspaper) =

African-Canadian anti-slavery newspaper

- Devoted to anti-slavery, temperance and general literature.
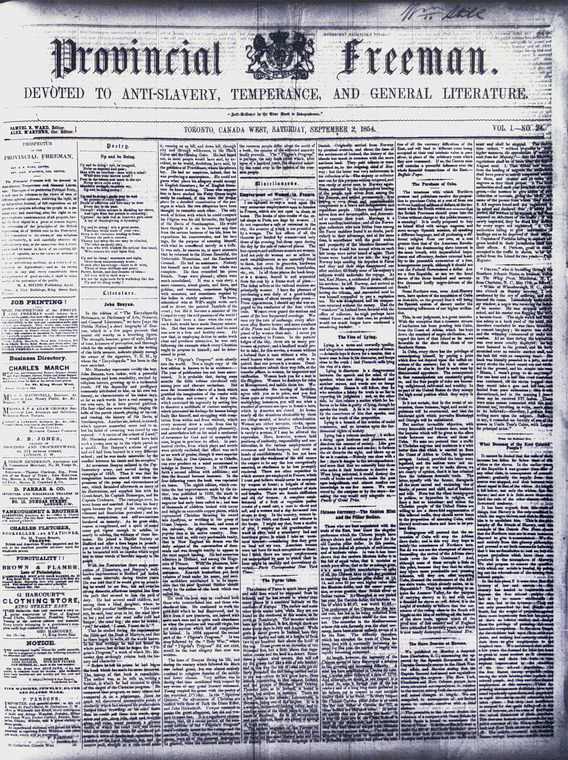
- The front page of the Provincial Freeman, September 2, 1854.
- Founder: Mary Ann Shadd Cary
- Publisher: Mary Ann Shadd Cary; Samuel Ringgold Ward; Isaac Shadd
- Founded: March 24, 1853
- Ceased publication: September 20, 1857
- Political alignment: Abolitionist
- City: Windsor, Ontario (1853-1854); Toronto, Ontario (1854-1855); Chatham, Ontario (1855-1957)

The Provincial Freeman was a Canadian weekly newspaper founded in 1853 by Mary Ann Shadd, a Black activist and writer. The newspaper was created to help raise awareness within the Black community for issues including anti-slavery efforts, civil rights movements and to advocate for black independence, with an emphasis on Black emigration to Canada. The Provincial Freeman was the first newspaper published by an African American woman, as well as the first Canadian newspaper. The Provincial Freeman has been recognized by scholars as an early example of Black journalism. The Provincial Freeman featured the work of many abolitionists, including the Shadd family, who helped the paper circulate in Canada and the northern United States until it ceased publication in 1857.

After the passing of the Fugitive Slave Act of 1850, which mandated the capture and return of Black people who had escaped slavery, Shadd saw an opportunity to start a newspaper representing the voices of free Black individuals. At the time, Black communities faced systemic racism in various ways including the many who were still enslaved, denied basic rights, or struggled to build fulfilling lives in the United States. She used the newspaper to advocate for emigration to Canada, which she saw promoted due to its better social conditions compared to the United States.

The Provincial Freeman was created to promote Black independence, and its mission was to advocate for the ending of slavery. The Provincial Freeman is a stepping stone for black journalists. The newspaper circulated across Canada, allowing others to be involved. The Provincial Freeman ceased publication in 1857.

== History ==
Shadd began her career teaching in African American schools along the East Coast and writing for various abolitionist papers. After the Fugitive Slave Act of 1850 was passed, she and her brother, Isaac Shadd, emigrated to Canada in 1851. At the North American Convention of Colored People, fellow activist Henry Bibb encouraged her to establish a school in Windsor Canada. Shadd opposed separate Black schools, causing a public disagreement. The mention of these differing perspectives was put in Bibb's newspaper, The Voice of the Fugitive. This debate highlighted a shared tension within the abolitionists and has been cited as playing a part in motivating Shadd to create The Provincial Freeman.

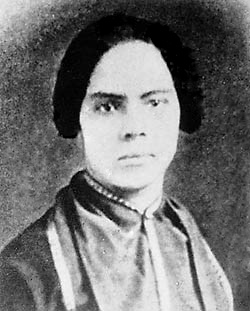
Mary Ann Shadd, circa 1850s

Aware that the 19th-century gender expectations might discourage readership, Shadd sought the support of Samuel Ringgold Ward, a prominent Black anti-slavery activist and newspaper publisher, to help lend credibility to the Provincial Freeman. She also enlisted Rev. Alexander McArthur, a white clergyman. Both Ward and McArthur were named on the masthead, while Shadd initially concealed her full involvement, listing herself only as a "publishing agent" and using her initials. Despite this, she managed and contributed to nearly every aspect of the publication.

In 1854, the newspaper moved to Chatham-Kent. There were many black influencers that were also editors like Shadd's brother Issac Shadd who was the publishing agent and also was the editor, like his sister. Mary Ann Shadd went on tours in Canada and the U.S to sell her newspaper. Where she advocated for anti-slavery and the emigration to Canada. The newspaper showed the accolades of many African Americans. It talked about education in Canada and also provided the readers with information of enslaved people who escaped. It was a way for many black people to show their own thoughts and talents; all of the editors and directors were African American allowing them to share creativity in a safe space. She wrote the articles and distributed the paper.

In 1854, she finally dropped the men's names from the masthead, revealed herself, and hired her sister, Amelia, to help edit The Freeman, the public outrage was so great she had to resign the following year. Before leaving, she made this parting opinion on June 30, 1855: "To Colored women, we have a word—we have 'broken the Editorial ice,' whether willingly or not, for your class in America; so go to Editing, as many of you as are willing, and as soon as you may, if you think you are ready." The paper's last publication was September 20, 1857. She pushed for many African Americans to escape the place where they were mistreated and fight for their beliefs. She wanted women to be at the fore front but because of society and how people viewed women it was a challenge, but she was up for it.

== Purpose ==
"The Provincial Freeman will be devoted to the elevation of the Colored People; and in seeking to effect this object, it will advocate the cause of temperance, in the strictest and most radical acceptation of that term. Partly, because such are the well-known sentiments of its editor, and, partly, because there is no such thing as the elevation of any people without it. For like reasons, the Freeman must be a straightforward, out outspoken anti-slavery paper." – The Provincial Freeman (24 March 1853)

Provincial Freeman was an anti-slavery newspaper, to promote emigration to Canada. Shadd wanted to offer Black Americans, who were often devalued in society the opportunity to build fuller, freer lives in Canada, where they could benefit from greater rights and social mobility. The newspaper's purpose was to reach the audience of both fugitives and free individuals from different economic backgrounds. Shadd envisioned Canada as a place where Black people could participate fully in civic life without enduring the weight of slavery's legacy. Through her own writings and those of other Black authors, she advocated for a society in which Black individuals could flourish free from racial inequality. Shadd advocated for African Americans to settle in Canada specifically in the West. The newspaper charged at racism and also condemned the operation of people begging for money, going door to door trying to exaggerate the condition of the fugitives. The newspaper's motto was “Self-reliance is the true road to independence.” Meaning that freedom isn’t something that you award to others, it is something that is earned based on your efforts and responsibilities. The newspaper pushed African Americans to insist that they were treated fairly. If they were not, they should take legal action. The newspaper also advocated for women's rights.

== Contributors ==
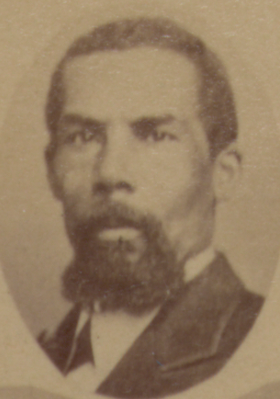
Isaac Shadd, 1874

Isaac Shadd managed the daily business affairs of the newspaper. Isaac's wife, Amelia Freeman Shadd, also contributed to editing the paper, highlighting the family involvement behind the publication.

Other than family, many well-known abolitionists also contributed to the Provincial Freeman like Martin Delany, William P. Newman, Samuel Ringgold Ward, and H. Ford Douglass. Delany, who later served as a major in the Union during the Civil War, supported Black emigration from the United States due to his belief that racism in America was deeply entrenched. However, he disagreed with Shadd on Canada's viability; he believed that a white-majority country like Canada would not support a Black nation and instead advocated for resettlement in Africa.

Mary Ann Shadd was the primary contributor to the paper. Although she initially wrote under her initials to conceal her identity, she later publicly claimed her role, declaring herself as the first woman to edit a newspaper and stating that she had “[broke] the Editorial Ice.” She also traveled extensively across Canada and the United States, giving lectures to raise subscriptions and funds to support formerly enslaved individuals.

In addition to formal contributors, the newspaper actively welcomed letters to the editor, encouraging public engagement and discourse on community issues. The paper became a vital platform for voicing concerns and ideas within the Black community, helping to shape a shared conversation around freedom, justice, and opportunity.

== Legacy ==
The impact of African American newspapers between 1850 and 1860 substantially fueled the abolitionist movement. Yet, sustaining publication during this period was extremely difficult. Publishers like Shadd pursued their work out of deep commitments to education, advocacy, and justice, using newspapers as tools to influence public opinion. Financial constraints, political resistance, and social barriers made it a constant struggle to keep these papers in circulation.

In Racial Uplift: The Nineteenth Century Thought of Black Newspaper Publisher Mary Ann Shadd Cary, Carol B. Conway notes that these newspapers empowered Black communities by shifting focus away from white-centered narratives. Conway mentions white readers engaged with Black papers to explore the public opinions circulating the Black community, especially regarding issues on slavery.

A testament to The Provincial Freeman's influence is its widespread circulation in Canada and among many northern states in the U.S., including New York, Chicago, Ohio, and Michigan. This added to ongoing public discourse on topics concerning civil right movements and emigration in decade preceding the American Civil War. Black newspapers often modeled their newspapers on mainstream white publications. According to media historian William David Sloan, early newspapers typically consisted of four pages, one of which was intentionally left blank so readers could add their own notes before passing them along to friends and family. These publications quickly became essential to shaping community awareness and dialogue.

In 1855, she served as a delegate to the National Convention of Colored People, highlighting her dedication to advancing the abolitionist and early women's suffrage movements. In recent news, her contributions to the convention have been gaining more attention within scholarly circles. At first, her impact was overlooked as she was not noted in Howard Bell’s book, Minutes and Proceedings of the National Negro Convention. Scholars were able to find her contributions in an article published in The British Banner, which is part of the Black Abolitionist Papers collection. During this time, it was a foreign concept for women to serve as delegates, sparking debates within the national convention. The matter was put to a vote and the majority, including Fredrick Douglass, voted in her favor.

Shadd's participation in the convention marked a historic turning point for women, particularly Black women, in political life. Her participation in the convention has been interpreted by historians as an early example to Black women's participation in politics.

=== Memorial ===
Today, a statue of Mary Ann Shadd Cary and a historic plaque stand in her honor at BME Freedom Park in Chatham-Kent, commemorating her lasting impact on Canadian and American history.

== See also ==
- Abolitionist publications
