= Mary Ann Shadd Cary House =

Historic house in Washington, D.C., United States

- U.S. National Register of Historic Places
- U.S. National Historic Landmark
- U.S. Historic district – Contributing property
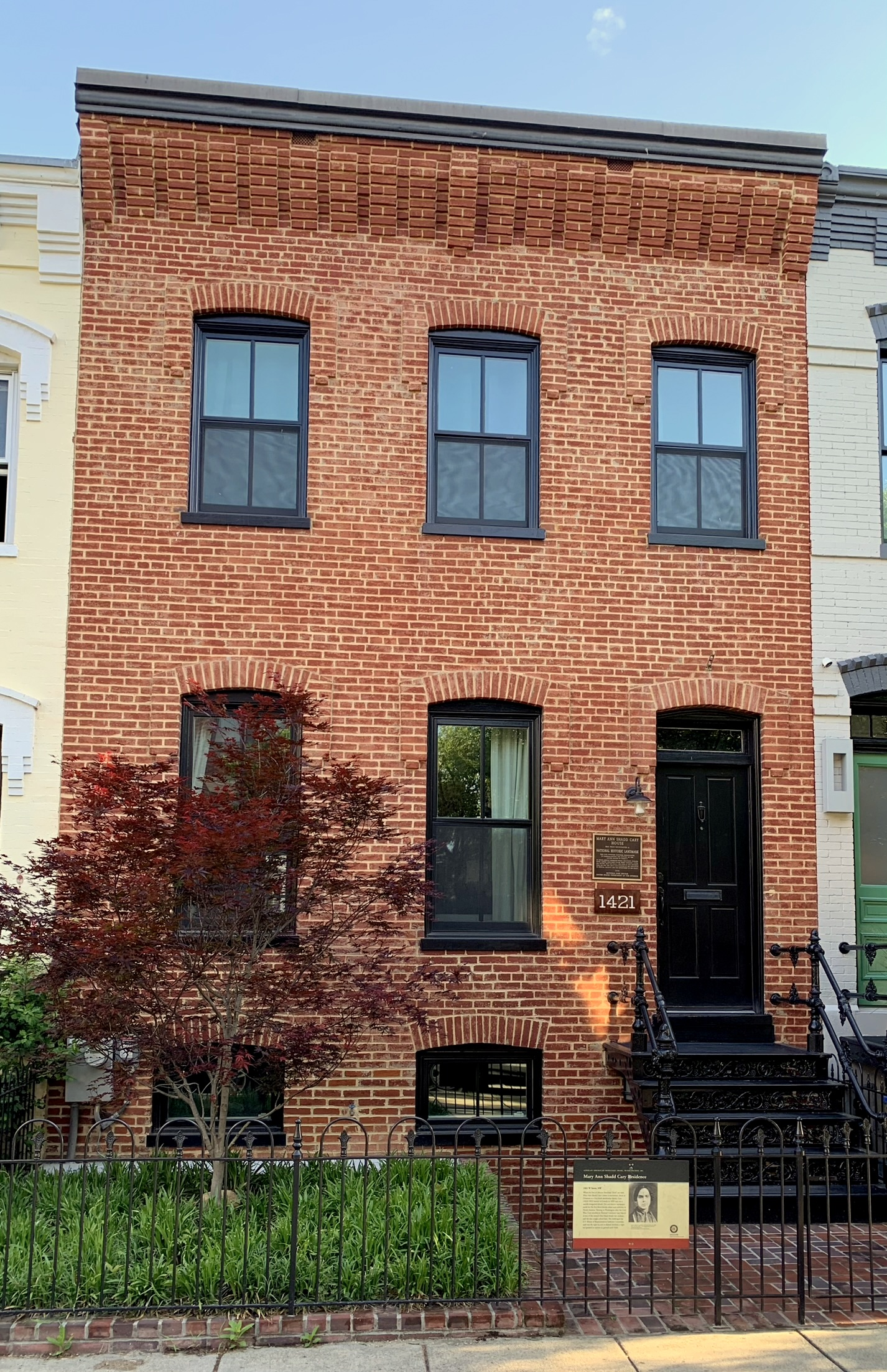
- Mary Ann Shadd Cary House in 2023

- Location within Washington, D.C. Location within the United States
- Location: 1421 W Street, NW; Washington, D.C. United States
- Coordinates: 38°55′9″N 77°1′58″W
- Built: 1881
- Architectural style: Italianate
- Part of: Greater U Street Historic District (ID93001129)
- NRHP reference No.: 76002128

Significant dates
- Added to NRHP: December 8, 1976
- Designated NHL: December 8, 1976
- Designated CP: December 31, 1998

The Mary Ann Shadd Cary House is a historic residence located at 1421 W Street, Northwest in Washington, D.C. From 1881 to 1893, it was the home of Mary Ann Shadd Cary (1823–93), a writer and abolitionist who was one of the first African American female journalists in North America, and who became one of the first black female lawyers after the American Civil War. As part of a national effort by the Afro-American Bicentennial Corporation, the house was declared a National Historic Landmark on December 8, 1976, and was listed on the National Register of Historic Places. It also is a contributing property to the Greater U Street Historic District and the African American Heritage Trail in Washington, D.C.

== Description and history ==
The Mary Ann Shadd Cary House is located on the southern fringe of Washington's Columbia Heights, on the north side of W Street between 14th Street and Florida Avenue. It is one of a series of brick row houses, probably built in the 1890s. It is a three-story home and is three bays wide, with a corbelled cornice, and projecting brick hoods around its windows. It was from 1881 to 1893 the home of Mary Ann Shadd Cary. Shadd Cary's children Sarah Cary and Linton Cary also lived here with their mother from 1881 to 1886 before moving out together to a house on 17th St. N.W. Shadd Cary was the first owner of the home and resided there until her death in 1893.

Mary Ann Shadd was born a free black person in the slave state of Delaware, and was educated in Pennsylvania. Her father was active in anti-slavery circles, sheltering fugitive slaves in the family home. At first a school teacher for African American children, she and other family members left for Canada following passage of the Fugitive Slave Act of 1850. Settling in Ontario, she began publishing works to inform American blacks about conditions in Canada, so that they could judge whether migration there was in their interests. This effort resulted in the founding of the Provincial Freeman, the first newspaper published by a black woman in North America, and the first by a woman in what is now Canada. After the American Civil War, she returned to the United States, where she returned to teaching and continued to be active in civil rights. She acquired a law degree in 1883.

== See also ==
- U-Street Corridor
- African American history
- List of National Historic Landmarks in Washington, D.C.
