= Colored Women's Progressive Franchise =

The Colored Women's Progressive Franchise was an organization advocating for equal rights of African American women organized by Mary Ann Shadd Cary in 1880. Also referred to as the Colored Women's Progressive Franchise Association or the Colored Women's Progressive Association, the organization paved the path for a movement of Black women's organizations and institutions that articulated feminist concerns and agendas, which followed the end of Reconstruction. Among the features of the significance of the Colored Women's Progressive Franchise is that it preceded the women's club movement in Washington, D.C., by more than a decade. It is speculated that this historical precocity (being ahead of its time) as well as Shadd Cary's confrontational style are among the reasons that the organization did not last for very long.

== Meeting and agenda ==
The first meeting of the Women's Progressive Franchise committee was held at Mt. Pisgah Chapel on R Street in Washington, D.C., the evening of February 9, 1880. The church's pastor Rev. J. Nichols presided over the meeting and Mrs. M. Jennings was appointed Secretary. The goals of the organization as articulated in the Statement of Purpose were for advancing equal rights of women through access to work, to conduct business, banking, newspapers "unbiased by sex restrictions and jealousies" and the right to vote (Black women's suffrage). Black women's suffrage was a key point in discussion and debate during the meeting.

Among those listed as present in the first meeting are:

- M. A. S. Cary (Mary Ann Shadd Cary)
- Mrs. Nichols
- Anna Montgomery
- Miss Jennings
- Mrs. Robinson
- Mrs. Ferris
- Mrs. Monroe

Prayer at the meeting was led by Mr. Williams. Mr. Wright and Mr. Washington were also listed among those present in meeting proceedings.

== Significance ==
The Colored Women's Progressive Franchise was ahead of its time and a forerunner of Black all-women's clubs that were to come in the 1890s, such as the Colored Women's League of Washington. The organization emphasized work parity and financial autonomy as well as suffrage for Black women, and thus showed a paradigm shift away from the maternal and family-centered rhetoric of women's reform movements at the time, putting pressure on gender ideologies in post-Reconstruction America.

== Press and Records ==
On February 20, 1880, the African-American newspaper People's Advocate reported a meeting of the Colored Women's Progressive Franchise at the Mt. Pisgah Chapel, indicating that there were about forty "ladies and gentlemen" present. However, the newspaper didn't cast a particularly favorable light on the organization.

The minutes and statement of purpose for the Colored Women's Progressive Franchise are held at the Moorland-Spingarn Research Center at Howard University's Library in Washington, D.C., among the Mary Ann Shadd Cary papers.

== See also ==
- National Association of Colored Women's Clubs
- National Council of Negro Women
- The National Era
- African-American women's suffrage movement
