= Operation Crucible (play) =

Operation Crucible is a play by Kieran Knowles about the Sheffield Blitz, the German Luftwaffe bombing of Sheffield, England, during the Second World War. The drama focuses on a group of four (fictional) steelworkers trapped inside the cellar of the Marples Hotel, in the city's Fitzalan Square, which was destroyed during bombing on 12 December 1940.

== History ==
The first play by actor Kieran Knowles. Operation Crucible, directed by Bryony Shanahan, opened for a run of nine performances at the small Finborough Theatre in Chelsea, London in December 2013. It had a second run at the venue in July 2015 as the theatre's main production, It transferred to the Crucible Theatre studio, Sheffield, again directed by Shanahan, where it opened in October 2016 for a seventeen-day run. John Murphy in The Stage, reviewing the play at the Sheffield theatre, commented on the "gorgeously poetic quality to Knowles’ dialogue, especially in the cast's rapid-fire, rhythmic delivery".

Operation Crucible transferred to 59E59 theaters in New York City in May 2018 as part of the theatre's Brits Off Broadway Festival and was Ben Brantley's New York Times Critics Pick It was adapted for BBC Radio Four and aired in July 2018 directed by Toby Swift.

Operation Crucible started an Off-Broadway run at the Davenport Theatre in October 2018. Salvatore D’Aquila, Christopher McCurry, James Wallwork, and playwright Kieran Knowles play the four men trapped by the bombing.
