= Eunice P. Shadd =

Canadian-American physician

- Born: 1846; West Chester, Pennsylvania
- Died: January 4, 1888 (aged 41–42); Xenia, Ohio
- Other name: Eunice Lindsay
- Education: M.D., Howard University College of Medicine, 1877
- Occupation: Physician
- Spouse: Frank T. Lindsay (m. 1877)
- Parent(s): Abraham D. Shadd; Harriet Burton Parnell
- Relatives: Mary Ann Shadd (sister); Isaac Shadd (brother)

Eunice P. Shadd, also known as Eunice Lindsay (1846 – January 4, 1888), was an American-Canadian medical doctor born in Pennsylvania and raised in Chatham, Ontario. She was the first black woman to graduate from Howard University College of Medicine.

== Early life ==
Eunice Shadd was born in 1846 in West Chester, Pennsylvania. (Note: From the 1850 census, Isaac was born in 1829 or 1830. He was the oldest of the siblings at home. Both Isaac and Amelia were born in Delaware. The rest of the children - Joseph, Sinclair, Emeline, Garrison, Sarah, Ada, Abraham, Eunice, and Sarah - were born in Pennsylvania. Harriet (49) was born in North Carolina, as was a woman old enough to be her mother, Mary Burton (70).) She was raised Catholic as one of 13 children born to Abraham D. Shadd and Harriet Burton Parnell, who were free African-Americans. Her father was a conductor on the Underground Railroad and known throughout anti-slavery activists.

Abraham moved his family in 1853 to Canada West (Ontario after Canadian confederation in 1867). Abraham was a landowner, politician, activist, and a farmer. (Note: Her siblings, Isaac Shadd and Mary Ann Shadd, moved to Ontario, Canada about the time that the Fugitive Slave Act of 1850 (September 18, 1850) was enacted that made it easier for slave takers to take runaway and free people into slavery from northern states. Mary Ann had written a pamphlet, "A Plea for Emigration, or Notes on Canada West in Its Moral, Social and Political Aspect" that informed free and enslaved blacks of the benefits of moving to Canada for freedom.) He continued his efforts to aid people escape slavery in Canada. Her siblings were well-educated, many of her sisters were teachers. Her oldest sister, Mary Ann Shadd, became a prominent journalist. Her brother Isaac Shadd (also known as I.D. Shadd) was a prominent and influential newspaper publisher, printer, and bookkeeper before he became Speaker of the Mississippi House of Representatives. (Note: A newspaper said that her brother J.D. Shadd was a Speaker of the Mississippi House of Representatives, which may be confused with her brother Isaac (I.D.) Shadd.)

== Adulthood ==
Eunice Shadd left Canada and moved to Washington, D.C. to be with her siblings Mary Ann and Abraham. She enrolled in the Howard University Normal School in 1870 and graduated in 1872. Shadd taught public school, and then enrolled in Howard's medical program in 1875. At Howard, Shadd studied with Charles Purvis.

Shadd graduated from Howard University College of Medicine in 1877. That same year, she married Dr. Frank T. Lindsay, who had graduated from the Howard medical program in 1875. The couple then moved to Xenia, Ohio, where both practiced medicine.

== Personal life ==
Shadd married Frank T. Lindsay, who was born in Jamestown, North Carolina, on December 28, 1849. He attended Oberlin College, Santhale Seminary, and Howard University College of Medicine, graduating in 1875 with a medical degree.

Eunice Shadd died on January 4, 1888, in Xenia. She is buried in Chatham Kent, Ontario Lindsay remarried after Shadd's death.
