= Sheffield Blitz =

German bombing of Sheffield during the Second World War

- Part of the Strategic bombing campaign of the Second World War
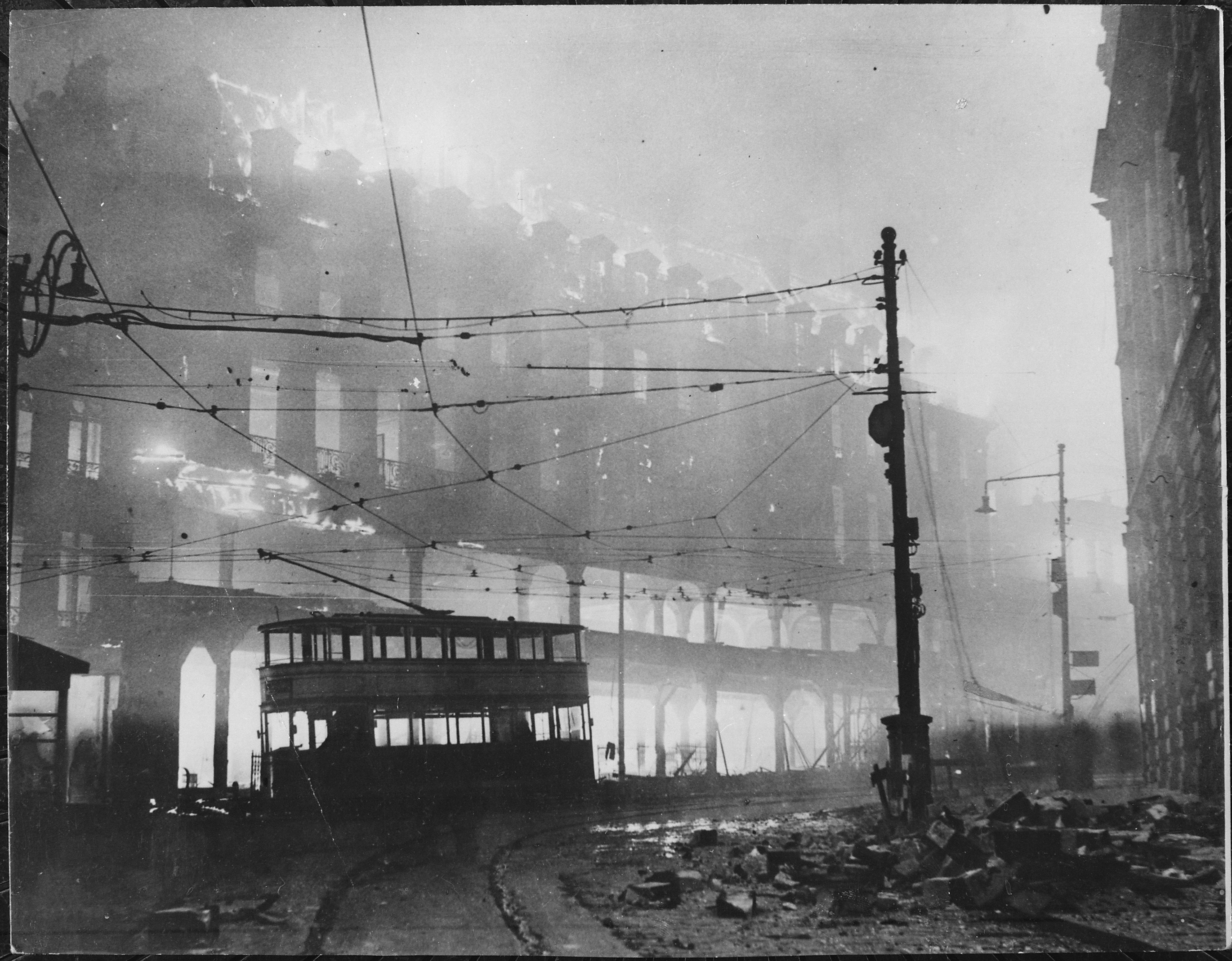
- Devastation in Sheffield city centre after the Blitz
Date	18 August 1940 – 8 May 1941 (264 days)
Location	Sheffield, England 53°23′N 1°28′W
Result	German strategic failure: Steel factories in Sheffield continued to operate and provide essential supplies for the war effort.; Widespread damage and civilian casualties, Sheffield in extensive structural ruins.

Belligerents
United Kingdom	Germany

Commanders and leaders
(United Kingdom) Winston Churchill; (United Kingdom) Hugh Dowding; (United Kingdom) Frederick Pile; (United Kingdom) Owen Tudor Boyd; (United Kingdom) Sir Leslie Gossage	(Nazi Germany) Adolf Hitler; (Nazi Germany) Hermann Göring; (Nazi Germany) Hugo Sperrle; (Nazi Germany) Albert Kesselring; (Nazi Germany) Hans Jeschonnek

Casualties and losses
660+ dead; 1,500+ injured; 40,000+ homeless; 3,000+ houses destroyed	Unknown

The Sheffield Blitz is the name given to the German Luftwaffe bombing campaign against Sheffield, England, during the Second World War. The first raid took place on 18 August 1940, with the final attack occurring on 8 May 1941. By far the heaviest bombardment occurred between 12–15 December, during which more than 660 civilians in the city were killed.

In 1940, Sheffield was a city of about 560,000 people and contained industries primarily centred on steel and armaments. Hadfields steelworks was also the only place in the UK at that time where 18-inch armour-piercing shells were made. Most factories were located in the East End of the city beside the River Don. Documents captured at the end of the war showed the targets for the raids included the Atlas Steelworks, Brown Bayley Steelworks, Meadowhall Iron Works, River Don Works, Darnall Wagon Works, Tinsley Park Collieries, East Hecla Works and Orgreave Coke Ovens.

There was a full moon on 14 December 1940, and both blitz nights were cold and clear, although some fog obscured the industrial East End of the city on the first night. The German code name for the operation was Operation Schmelztiegel ("Crucible").

== Summer raids ==
The first German air raid against Sheffield took place on 18 August 1940. An unknown number of aircraft were launched against the city, dropping bombs on Blackbrook Road in Lodge Moor in the western suburbs; there were no casualties. This was followed on 23 August by a raid against the Siemens steelworks in Stocksbridge, during which one person was injured and minor damage was caused to the factory but the majority of bombs fell on farmland to the north. A third, more substantial bombing raid took place on 29 August, affecting the south side of the city centre and the light-industrial suburbs of Highfield and Lowfield; four people were killed in a bomb explosion on Sheaf Street, close to Sheffield Midland railway station. A further bombing raid took place against the city on 10–11 September.

== 12 December raid ==
On the afternoon of Thursday, 12 December, British monitoring stations detected X Verfahren (sometimes called X-Gerät) radio beams being laid across northern England and calculated that the likely target of the coming raid would be Sheffield.

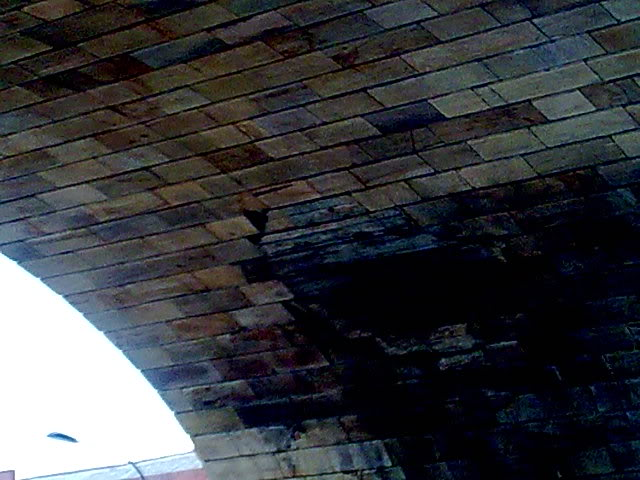
Patchwork on the Wicker Arches covering an unexploded bomb hole.

The yellow alert was received at 6:15 pm, followed by the purple alert at 6:45 pm. The red alert was sounded at 7:00 pm. The attack was made by three main groups of aircraft flying from airfields in northern France, including Cambrai. 13 Heinkel 111s from Kampfgruppe 100, the German Pathfinder unit arrived over the city at 7:41 pm and dropped 16 SC50 high-explosive bombs, 1,009 B1 E1 ZA incendiaries and 10,080 B1 E1 incendiaries. The first incendiaries were dropped over the suburbs of Norton Lees and Gleadless.

The first main group was made up of three waves of 36 Junkers Ju 88s and 29 Heinkel He 111s. The second group was made up of 23 Junkers 88s, 74 Heinkel 111s and 7 Dornier Do 17s. The last group was made up of 63 Junkers 88s and 35 Heinkel 111s, a total of 280 aircraft. At about 9:30 pm, a line of bombs fell on Campo Lane and Vicar Lane, demolishing the West end of the Cathedral. At about 10:50 pm a 500 kg bomb fell on and destroyed the C&A and Burtons buildings opposite the Marples Hotel in Fitzalan Square. At 11:44 pm, The Marples Hotel itself received a direct hit. The death toll of this incident was 78, the single biggest loss of life in the attacks. Full details of the identities of the victims and the extensive police efforts made to ensure everyone was identified can be found in the Sheffield City Archives. The deceased were later found in the cellar, a large concrete box with deep encasing floors and walls beneath the carriageway outside the Marples building. The majority of the bombs on this night fell on the city centre or residential districts, with the last bombs falling at 4:00 am.

== 15 December raid ==
The second night of the Blitz saw the first use of a new German policy for their pathfinders. High-explosive bombs were no longer carried and were replaced by incendiaries. On this night the pathfinder force was made up of 16 Heinkel 111s, which dropped 11,520 B1 E1 incendiaries between 7:00 pm and 7:50 pm. The 15 large fires and the numerous small fires started were visible from 150 km away.

The main raid was carried out by 50 Heinkel 111s and 11 Dornier 17s, and finished at 10:15 pm. Many steelworks received hits, including Hadfields, Brown Bayleys and Steel, Peech and Tozer Ltd, although the damage was not serious enough to affect production.

== Later raids ==
December 1940 marked the end of the primary bombing campaign against Sheffield, as the Luftwaffe continued to be weakened and targets switched to cities and industrial sites within closer proximity of the European mainland. Some lighter bombing raids did continue against Sheffield for several more months however, whenever weather conditions permitted. Further bombing raids against the city were recorded on 15–16 January 1941, on 4–5 February 1941, and on 15 February 1941.

The largest raid against Sheffield since the previous winter took place on 14 March 1941, when 117 aircraft attacked the city, dropping more than 83 tonnes of high explosives and 328 incendiary canisters. The final attack on Sheffield took place on 8 May 1941, when a fleet of 34 aircraft dropped more than 53 tonnes of high explosives and 802 incendiary canisters over the city.

== Aftermath ==
In total over 660 people were killed, 1,500 injured and 40,000 made homeless. 3,000 homes were demolished, with a further 3,000 badly damaged. A total of 78,000 homes received damage. Six George Medals were awarded to citizens of Sheffield for their bravery during the raids. 134 victims of the raids were buried in a communal grave in City Road Cemetery.

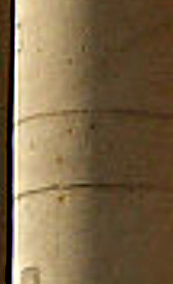
Shrapnel damage left on the pillars of the Sheffield City Hall

King George VI and Queen Elizabeth toured the city soon after the raids to inspect the damage and boost morale amongst survivors. Prime Minister Winston Churchill also toured the blitzed city, speaking through loudspeakers to a 20,000-strong crowd in Town Hall Square and giving his signature 'V' for 'Victory' V sign.

== Stage play ==
Operation Crucible, a play about the Sheffield Blitz by Kieran Knowles, has been performed in London, Sheffield and New York.
