= Mary Ann Shadd =

American-Canadian anti-slavery activist, journalist, publisher, teacher, lawyer

Mary Ann Shadd Cary
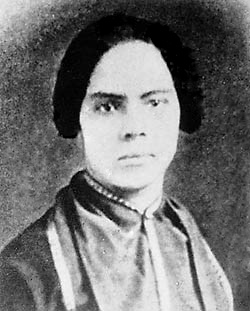
- Born: Mary Ann Shadd; October 9, 1823; Wilmington, Delaware, U.S.
- Died: June 5, 1893 (aged 69); Washington, D.C., U.S.
- Resting place: Columbian Harmony Cemetery
- Education: Howard University (School of Law)
- Occupations: Anti-slavery activist, journalist, publisher, teacher, lawyer
- Spouse: Thomas F. Cary (m. 1856; died 1860)
- Children: 2
- Parent(s): Abraham D. Shadd; Harriet Burton Parnell
- Relatives: Eunice P. Shadd (sister), Isaac Shadd (brother), Garrison W. Shadd (brother)

Signature
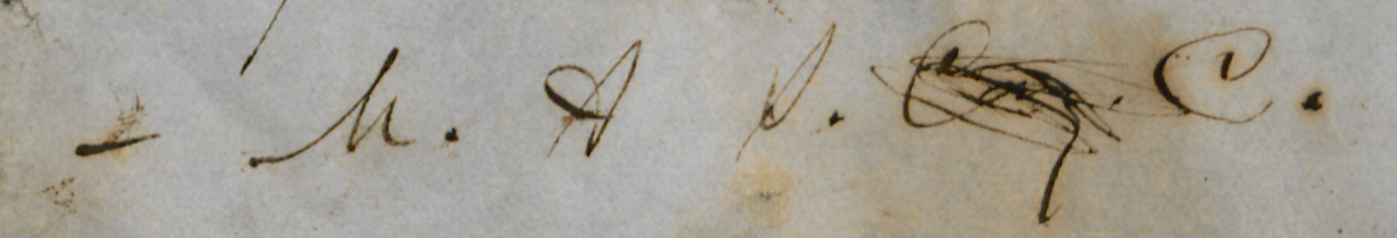

Mary Ann Camberton Shadd Cary (October 9, 1823 – June 5, 1893) was an American-Canadian anti-slavery activist, journalist, publisher, teacher, and lawyer. She was the first black woman publisher in North America and the first woman publisher in Canada. She was also the second black woman to attend law school in the United States. Mary Shadd established the newspaper Provincial Freeman in 1853, which was published weekly in southern Ontario. It advocated equality, integration, and self-education for black people in Canada and the United States.

Mary's family was involved in the Underground Railroad, assisting those fleeing slavery in the United States. After the passage of the Fugitive Slave Act of 1850, her family relocated to what is today southern Ontario, Canada (then the western part of the United Canadas). She returned to the United States during the American Civil War, where she recruited soldiers for the Union. Self-taught, Mary went to Howard University Law School, and continued advocacy for civil rights for African Americans and women for the rest of her life.

== Early life ==
Mary Ann Camberton Shadd was born on October 9, 1823, in Wilmington, Delaware, the eldest of thirteen children of Abraham Doras Shadd and Harriet Parnell Shadd. Her parents were free African Americans active in abolitionist circles, and the family home often served as a refuge for freedom seekers traveling on the Underground Railroad. The family was Catholic.

Because Delaware law restricted the education of Black children, the Shadd family moved to West Chester, Pennsylvania, where Shadd attended a Quaker school and began teaching while still young. She later taught in Delaware, Pennsylvania, New York, and New Jersey.

=== Family ===
Shadd Cary was one of thirteen children in a family engaged in abolitionist organizing in the United States and later in Canada West. Several of her siblings went on to notable public careers:

- Isaac D. Shadd served in the Mississippi Legislature during Reconstruction from 1871 to 1874.
- Eunice P. Shadd graduated from Howard University College of Medicine in 1877 and became a physician.
- Abraham W. Shadd trained in law at Harvard University and practiced in North Buxton, Ontario.
- Emeline Shadd joined the faculty of Howard University in Washington, D.C., among the earliest women appointed there.

== Educational work and integrated schooling ==
Education was central to Shadd's approach to racial equality. Raised in a family committed to abolition and literacy, she began teaching as a teenager. In 1840, at the age of sixteen, she established a school for Black children in Wilmington, Delaware, at a time when Delaware law restricted or prohibited the education of African Americans. Teaching under such conditions required organization and resolve. She later taught in Norristown, Pennsylvania, New York City, and other northern communities, gaining experience within networks of Black and abolitionist educators.

After the passage of the Fugitive Slave Act of 1850, Shadd emigrated to Canada West (now Ontario). In 1851 she opened a school in Windsor, Ontario, and soon after established another in Chatham, Ontario, serving the children of formerly enslaved families and free Black settlers who had migrated north.

The Windsor school offered day classes for children and evening instruction for adults, many of whom had been denied literacy under slavery. The schools welcomed both boys and girls. At a time when separate schools for Black students were common in parts of Canada West and the United States, Shadd resisted segregation as a permanent solution to discrimination. She argued that Black children should attend common schools alongside white students whenever possible. This position placed her at odds with some Black leaders who supported separate institutions as a pragmatic response to inequality.

For Shadd, education was not charity but preparation for citizenship. She emphasized literacy, discipline, and economic independence, arguing that progress required "self-reliance rather than dependence." In her speeches and later in the pages of the Provincial Freeman, she framed schooling as both practical training and political assertion.

After returning to the United States during the American Civil War, Shadd continued teaching. She worked in Black schools in Wilmington before relocating to Washington, D.C., where she taught for approximately fifteen years in the city's public schools and later at Howard University.

== Social activism ==
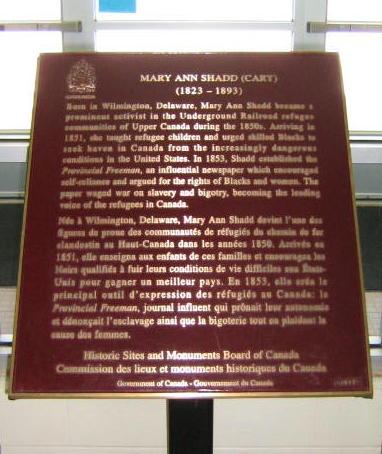
Plaque to Shadd (Cary) in Chatham, Ontario, from the national Historic Sites and Monuments Board. Photo: OntarioPlaques.com

In 1848, Frederick Douglass asked readers in his newspaper, The North Star, to offer their suggestions on what could be done to improve life for African Americans. Shadd, then 25 years of age, wrote to him to say, "We should do more and talk less." She expressed her frustration with the many conventions that had been held to that date, such as those attended by her father, where speeches were made and resolutions passed about the evils of slavery and the need for justice for African Americans. Yet little tangible improvement had resulted. Douglass published her letter in his paper.

When the Fugitive Slave Law of 1850 in the United States threatened to return free Northern blacks and escaped slaves into bondage, Shadd and her brother Isaac Shadd moved to Canada, and settled in Windsor, Ontario, across the border from Detroit, where Shadd's efforts to create free black settlements in Canada first began.

An advocate for emigration, in 1852, Shadd published a pamphlet entitled A Plea for Emigration; or Notes of Canada West, in Its Moral, Social and Political Aspect: with Suggestions respecting Mexico, West Indies and Vancouver's Island for the Information of Colored Emigrants. The pamphlet discussed the benefits of emigration, as well as the opportunities for blacks in the area.

== The Provincial Freeman ==
In 1853, Shadd founded an anti-slavery newspaper, called the Provincial Freeman. The paper's slogan was "Devoted to antislavery, temperance and general literature." It was published weekly and the first issue was published in Toronto, Ontario, on March 24, 1853. It ran for four years before financial challenges ended its publication.

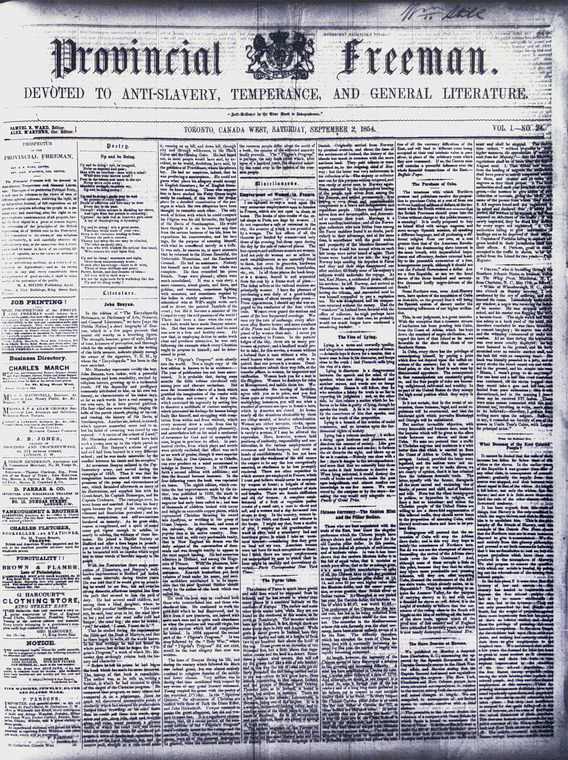
The front page of the Provincial Freeman, September 2, 1854.

Shadd was aware that her female name would repel some readers, because of the gender expectations of 19th-century society. Therefore, she persuaded Samuel Ringgold Ward, a black abolitionist who published several abolitionist newspapers, including Impartial Citizen, to help her publish it. She also enlisted the help of Rev. Alexander McArthur, a white clergyman. Their names were featured on the masthead, but Shadd was involved in all aspects of the paper.

Her brother Isaac Shadd managed the daily business affairs of the newspaper. Isaac was also a committed abolitionist, and would later host gatherings to plan the raid on Harper's Ferry at his home.

Shadd traveled widely in Canada and the United States to increase subscription to the paper, and to publicly solicit aid for runaway slaves. Because of the Fugitive Slave Act, these trips included significant risk to Shadd's safety; free blacks could be captured by bounty hunters seeking escaped slaves.

As was typical in the black press, the Provincial Freeman played an important role by giving voice to the opinions of black Canadian anti-slavery activists.

The impact of African-American newspapers from 1850 to 1860 was significant in the abolitionist movement. However, it was challenging to sustain publication. Publishers like Shadd undertook their work because of a commitment to education and advocacy and used their newspapers as a means to influence opinion. They had to overcome financial, political, and social challenges to keep their papers afloat.

Carol B. Conaway writes in "Racial Uplift: The Nineteenth Century Thought of Black Newspaper Publisher Mary Ann Shadd Cary" that these newspapers shifted the focus from whites to blacks in an empowering way. She writes that whites read these newspapers to monitor the level of dissatisfaction among African Americans and to measure their tolerance for continued slavery in America.

Black newspapers often modeled their newspapers on mainstream white publications. According to research conducted by William David Sloan in his various historical textbooks, the first newspapers were about four pages and had one blank page to provide a place for people to write their own information before passing it along to friends and relatives. He also discussed how the newspapers during these early days were the center of information for society and culture.

In 1854, Shadd changed the masthead to feature her own name, rather than those of McArthur and Ward. She also hired her sister to help edit the paper. There was intense criticism of the change, and Shadd was forced to resign the following year.

== Civil War and postbellum activism ==
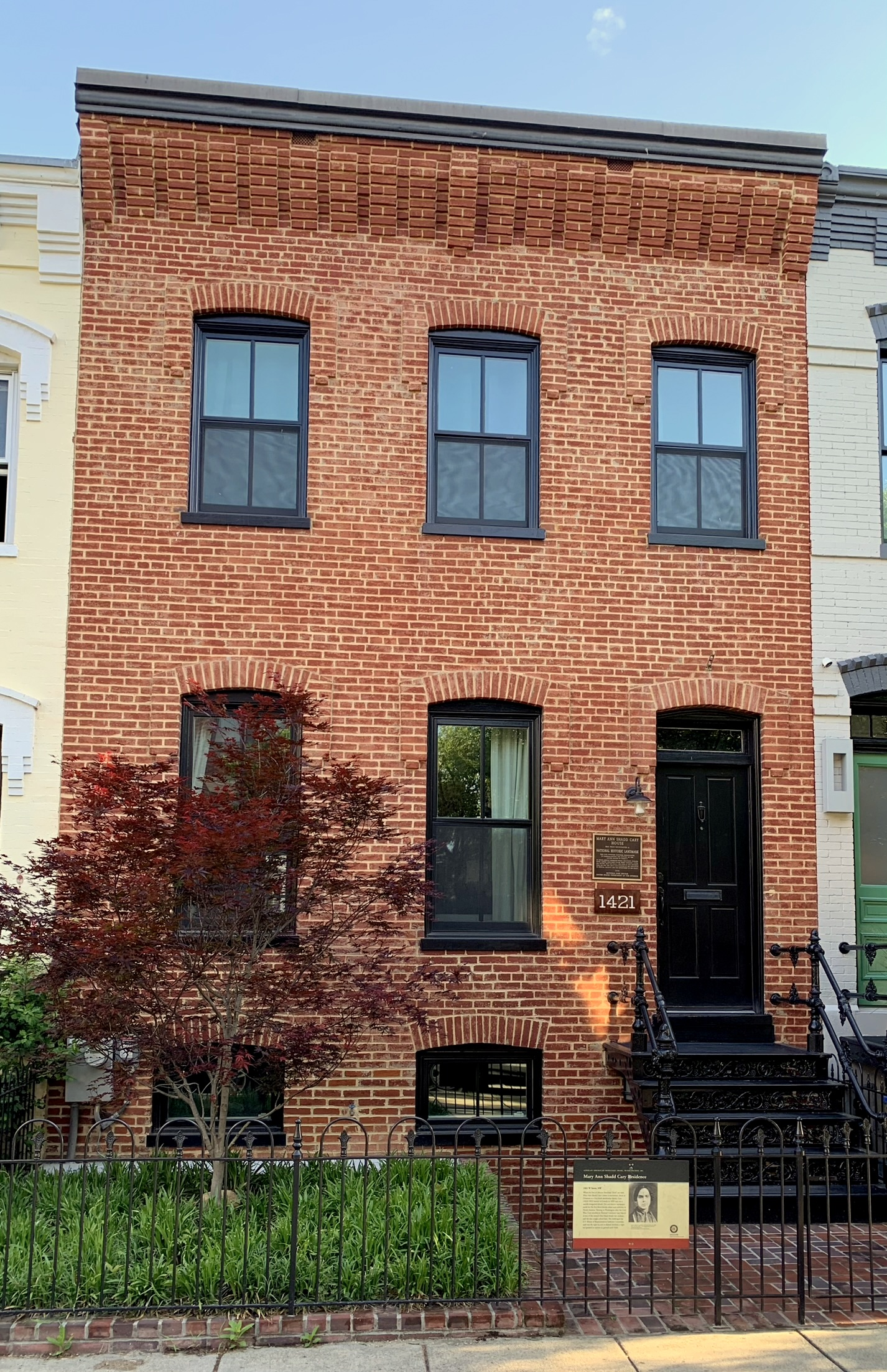
Mary Ann Shadd Cary House in Washington, D.C.

Between 1855 and 1856, Shadd traveled in the United States as an anti-slavery speaker, advocating for full racial integration through education and self-reliance. In her speeches, she advised all blacks to insist on fair treatment, and to take legal action if necessary.

Shadd sought to participate in the 1855 Philadelphia Colored Convention, but women had never been permitted to attend, and the assembly had to debate whether to let her sit as a delegate. Her advocacy of emigration made her a controversial figure and she was only admitted by a slim margin of 15 votes. According to Frederick Douglass's Paper, although she gave a speech at the Convention advocating for emigration, she was so well-received that the delegates voted to give her ten more minutes to speak. However, her presence at the convention was largely elided from the minutes, likely because she was a woman.

In 1856, she married Thomas F. Cary, a Toronto barber who was also involved with the Provincial Freeman. They had a daughter named Sarah and a son named Linton.

In 1858, Shadd was a member of the Chatham Vigilance Committee that sought to prevent former slaves from being returned to the United States and brought back into slavery, such as in the case of Sylvanus Demarest.

After her husband died in 1860, Shadd Cary and her children returned to the United States. During the American Civil War, at the behest of the abolitionist Martin Delany, she served as a recruiting officer to enlist black volunteers for the Union Army in the state of Indiana.

Shadd attended Howard University School of Law and graduated at the age of 60 in 1883, becoming the second black woman in the United States to earn a law degree.

She wrote for the newspapers The National Era and The People's Advocate, and in 1880, organized the Colored Women's Progressive Franchise.

Shadd Cary joined the National Woman Suffrage Association, working alongside Susan B. Anthony and Elizabeth Cady Stanton to advocate for women's suffrage, testifying before the Judiciary Committee of the House of Representatives.

== Death ==
Shadd died in Washington, D.C., on June 5, 1893, from stomach cancer at the age of 69. She was interred at Columbian Harmony Cemetery. Despite her incredible legacy, Shadd was buried in an unmarked grave in Washington, D.C.. It wasn’t until the late 20th century that her contributions were formally recognized and her grave marked.

== Commemoration & public recognition ==
=== Historic designations ===
- In the United States, Shadd Cary's former residence in the U Street Corridor of Washington, DC, was declared a National Historic Landmark in 1976.
- In Canada, she was designated a Person of National Historic Significance, with a plaque from the National Historic Sites and Monuments Board placed in Chatham, Ontario.

=== Institutional honors & inductions ===
- In 1987, she was designated a Women's History Month Honoree by the National Women's History Project.
- In 1998, Shadd Cary was inducted into the National Women's Hall of Fame.

=== Educational & civic inclusion ===
- Shadd Cary is featured in Canada's citizenship test study guide, released in 2009.
- The Mary Ann Shadd Cary Post Office, named that in 2021, is at 500 Delaware Avenue, Suite 1, in Wilmington, Delaware.

=== Public monuments & visual commemoration ===
- At BME Freedom Park, Ontario provincial plaques also honor her and her newspaper, the Provincial Freeman. In Toronto, a Heritage Toronto plaque marks where she published the Provincial Freeman while living in the city from 1854 to 1855.
- Shadd's 197th birthday was observed with a Google Doodle on October 9, 2020, appearing across Canada, the United States, Latvia, Senegal, Ghana, Nigeria, Kenya, Tanzania, and South Africa.
- Shadd is featured on a Canadian postal stamp issued January 29, 2024. The stamp is part of Canada's Black Heritage Month stamp series.
- On May 12, 2022, the University of Windsor in Ontario, Canada, unveiled a bronze statue of Mary Ann Shadd Cary created by local artist Donna Mayne. Members of the Shadd family and descendants attended the unveiling.

== Archives ==
The Mary Ann Shadd Cary fonds (F 1409) at the Archives of Ontario is one of the few surviving collections created by Mary Ann Shadd Cary that is held by an archival institution. It is the most comprehensive set of records available. It provides a unique and substantive viewpoint of Shadd Cary's work on the international anti-slavery movement. The materials offer insight into the years she lived in Canada West (now Ontario) between 1851 and 1863. The fonds consists of letters received by and written by Mary Ann Shadd Cary during her time living in present-day Ontario. It also includes business records and lecture notes, as well as copies of articles written by Shadd Cary on topics such as supporting integrated schools, fighting segregation, and the political stance taken by Provincial Freeman editorial staff. Included is correspondence between members of Shadd Cary's family, including her husband Thomas Cary and her brother Isaac Shadd, as well as correspondence with prominent African-American abolitionists William Still, H. Ford Douglas, and Rev. Samuel Ringgold Ward, among others.

The records were acquired from Ed and Maxine Robbins. In 1974, they discovered the records following the demolition of an old building on their property that had once served as Shadd Cary's home in Chatham, Ontario. The materials were saved from the resulting rubble. The records were left in the home when Shadd Cary returned to the United States. After the discovery, the material was loaned to the Archives of Ontario in 1986 for microfilming. The records were also cleaned and treated to repair damage. The original records were returned to the Robbins family and remained in their custody until 2022 when they were donated to the archives. This material is available on self-serve microfilm MS 483.

These records were transcribed on February 14, 2023, as part of Douglass Day. Initiated by the Colored Conventions Project, Douglass Day is an annual celebration that commemorates Frederick Douglass' birthday and Black History Month with a transcribe-a-thon. Douglass Day 2023 was launched with the Archives of Ontario as a primary partner. The focus of Douglas Day 2023 was the transcription and enrichment of newly-digitized collections from Mary Ann Shadd Cary.

The Library and Archives Canada holds the Mary Ann Shadd Cary collection. The archival reference number is R4182-0-X-E, former archival reference number MG24-K22. The collection covers the date range 1852 to 1889. It comprises 1.6 centimetres of textual records, which consists of personal and professional correspondence, various notes about her life, and copies of her works as an abolitionist. The collection also includes Shadd Cary's original passport and Naturalization Certificate as well as a black and white portrait photograph of her, the only known one of Shadd Cary that exists.

== See also ==
- African American history
- African American literature
- List of African-American abolitionists
- List of African American writers
- Eunice P. Shadd
- Isaac Shadd
- Black women in American law
