= Mount Pleasant Cemetery, Melfort =

Cemetery in Melfort, Canada

Mount Pleasant Cemetery
- Interactive map of Mount Pleasant Cemetery

Details
- Established: 1890
- Location: Melfort Street West, Melfort, Saskatchewan, Canada
- Coordinates: 52.857110°N 104.642110°W
- Style: Rural
- Website: www.melfort.ca/p/mount-pleasant-cemetery
- Find a Grave: Mount Pleasant Cemetery

Mount Pleasant Cemetery is a cemetery located in Melfort, Saskatchewan, Canada. Its first burial was recorded in 1890.

== Notable interments ==
=== Medical personalities ===
- Alfred Schmitz Shadd (1869–1915), Saskatchewan's first black doctor

=== Politicians ===
- George Dyer Weaver (1908–1986), Member of Parliament for Churchill, metallurgical engineer
