= Abraham D. Shadd =

Abraham Doras Shadd
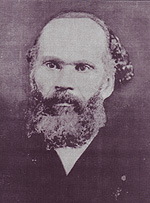
- Abraham Doras Shadd
- Born: March 2, 1801; Wilmington, Delaware, U.S.
- Died: February 11, 1882 (aged 80); Ontario, Canada
- Resting place: Maple Leaf Cemetery, Kent County, Ontario
- Occupations: Abolitionist, civil rights activist, shoemaker
- Known for: Underground Railroad activity; early Black elected official in Canada
- Spouse: Harriet Parnell
- Children: 13, including Mary Ann Shadd, Eunice P. Shadd, Isaac Shadd

Abraham Doras Shadd (March 2, 1801 – February 11, 1882) was an African-American abolitionist and civil rights activist who emigrated to Ontario, Canada, and became one of Canada's first black elected officials. He was the father of prominent activist and publisher Mary Ann Shadd and her siblings Eunice P. Shadd and Isaac Shadd.

== Personal life ==
The Shadd family held a visible place in Wilmington’s community life. Amelia, his mother, operated a tea room that became a gathering place for both free Black residents and white patrons in the early years of the nineteenth century.

Through his father, he was a grandson of Hans Schad, also known as John Shadd. Hans was a soldier from Hesse-Cassel, a German state whose troops, commonly called Hessians, were hired by Britain during eighteenth-century wars in North America. Hans later settled in Delaware and married Elizabeth Jackson, a free Black woman, establishing the Shadd family’s multiracial lineage in the late eighteenth century.

Shadd learned the trade of shoemaking from his father and established himself as a shoemaker in Wilmington. As a skilled artisan, he earned a stable livelihood, acquired property, and supported a large household through his trade.

Shadd married Harriet Parnell in the early 1820s and together they had thirteen children, including Mary Ann, Isaac, Abraham, Emeline, Eunice, Elizabeth, Harriet, Joseph Lewis, Garrison, Sarah Matilda, Ada Theresa, Amelia and Gerrit.

Several of Shadd’s children went on to notable careers. Mary Ann Shadd became a teacher, publisher, lawyer, and the first Black woman in North America to publish a newspaper. Isaac D. Shadd served in the Mississippi Legislature during Reconstruction from 1871 to 1874. Abraham W. Shadd, trained in law at Harvard, practiced in North Buxton, Ontario. Emeline Shadd joined the faculty of Howard University in Washington, D.C., among the earliest women appointed there. Eunice P. Shadd graduated from Howard University College of Medicine in 1877 and became a physician.

The Shadd homes in Wilmington and later West Chester functioned as stations on the Underground Railroad. Freedom seekers were sheltered, provided with food and clothing, and guided northward as they continued toward safety in Canada.

In 1850, following the passage of the Fugitive Slave Act of 1850, which increased penalties for assisting escaped enslaved people and heightened legal risks for free Black communities, the Shadd family relocated to Canada West, settling in the North Buxton area of present-day Ontario.

== Civil rights and abolitionist movements ==
By the 1830s, Abraham Shadd started to become more prominent in the abolitionist movement. He used both his homes in West Chester, Pennsylvania, and Wilmington, Delaware, to provide lodging for fugitive slaves fleeing southern states. He was a prominent voice in the anti-colonization movement. Shadd was one of five black men at the founding of the Board of Managers of the American Anti-Slavery Society in 1833, as well as a prominent member of the Colored Conventions Movement, serving as a leading delegate in both the 1841 and 1848 black national conventions, both held in Philadelphia.

== Life in Canada ==
While being a vocal critic of black colonization for most of his life, Abraham Shadd was prompted to move his family north to Canada West (Ontario, Canada) with the passing of the Fugitive Slave Act of 1850. Less than a decade later he would become one of the first black elected officials in Canada, being elected in 1859 to a seat on the Raleigh Township Council. Shadd became a very prominent member of his new Canadian community, creating a school within the Raleigh Township, as well as creating a loan system with his farm tools and equipment, in order to assist other farmers in the community. He also was a member and early trustee of the Prince Hall Masonic Lodge, which assisted former black slaves and freed men in their immigration to Canada West.

== Death ==
Shadd died on February 11, 1882. He was a very prominent and well-known man within Canada West and the abolitionist and civil rights movements of the 1800s. His prominence fostered a large funeral ceremony attended at Maple Leaf Cemetery by residents of Kent County, where he would be buried.

== Legacy ==
In February 2009, Shadd was commemorated with a stamp by Canada Post.

In 1994, a central roadway running through North Buxton was officially renamed A.D. Shadd Road in recognition of his contributions.
