= List of Masonic abbreviations =

Abbreviations used by Freemasons

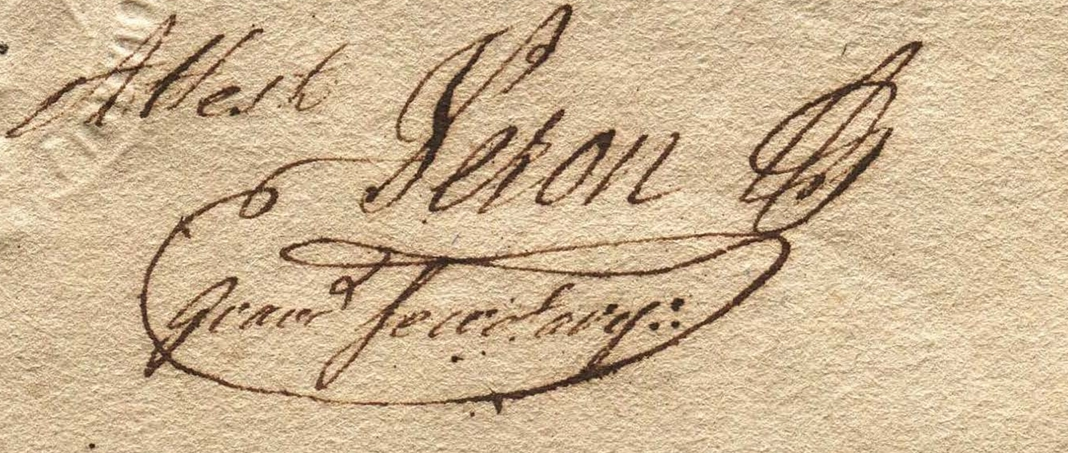
1812: Official document bearing the signature of the Grand Secretary of the Louisiana Grand Lodge, marked with the traditional three dots in triangle (∴), a Masonic symbol.

Masonic abbreviations of technical terms or official titles are very extensively used in Freemasonry traditionally using the Masonic three dots. They serve to abbreviate long or commonly-referenced titles in the fraternity.

These abbreviations were rarely employed in the earlier Masonic publications. There are no abbreviations, for example, found in Anderson's Constitutions. These came into use particularly by French authors during the 19th century.

== Typography ==
The Three dots symbol, ⸫ – also known as "tripunctual abbreviation" or "triple dot" – is used all over the world in Freemasonry for abbreviations, signatures, and symbolic representation. The dots are typically arranged in a triangular pattern and carry multiple layers of meaning within Masonic tradition. The three dots symbol is used only for Masonic abbreviations, any non-masonic abbreviations must be written with a simple dot, as an example a date on a Masonic document could be written 6024 A⸫L⸫/2024 A.D. The symbol has a Unicode codepoint, the U+2234 ∴ THEREFORE sign used in mathematics.

== History ==
The symbol has been used in Freemasonry since its earliest speculative days, at least as early as 1764, where it is found in the registers of La Sincerité Lodge in Besançon, France which strongly indicates an earlier use. While some attribute its widespread adoption to a circular issued by the Grand Orient de France on August 12, 1774, evidence shows earlier usage.

The symbol predates Freemasonry, appearing in various contexts:

- Mathematical notation (as the "therefore" symbol)
- Christian religious texts (representing the Trinity)

The doubling of a letter is intended to express the plural of that word of which the single letter is the abbreviation. For example, B∴ signifies "Brother," and BB∴ " "Brothers." L∴ is used to denote "Lodge", and LL∴ to denote "Lodges". However exceptions exist; for example, Sovereign Grand Inspectors General is abbreviated as S∴G∴I∴G∴, and not S∴G∴II∴G∴.

Sometimes the same abbreviation can be used for different words, in this case the context matters, for example; F∴M∴ can mean both Free-Masonry or Free Mason, FF∴MM∴ would be its plural form.

== List ==
Some examples of Masonic abbreviations are:

=== A ===
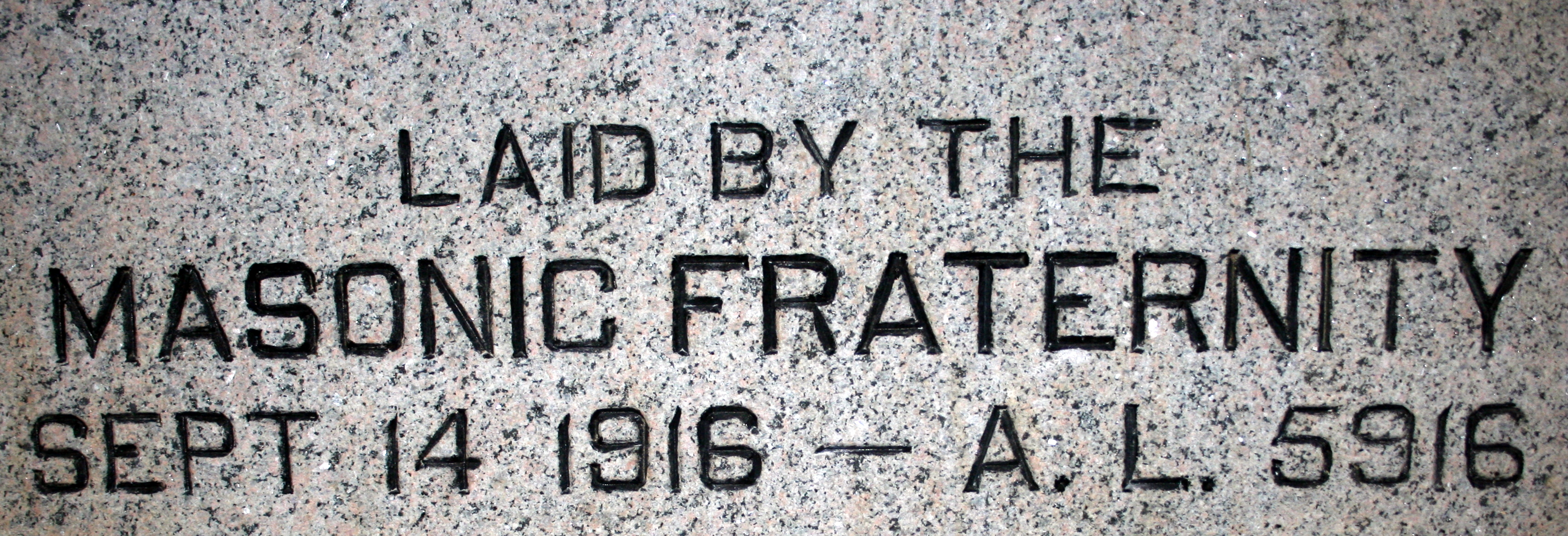
Detail of a cornerstone in a Masonic lodge in Rochester, Minnesota with the date given in both Common Era year and Anno Lucis.

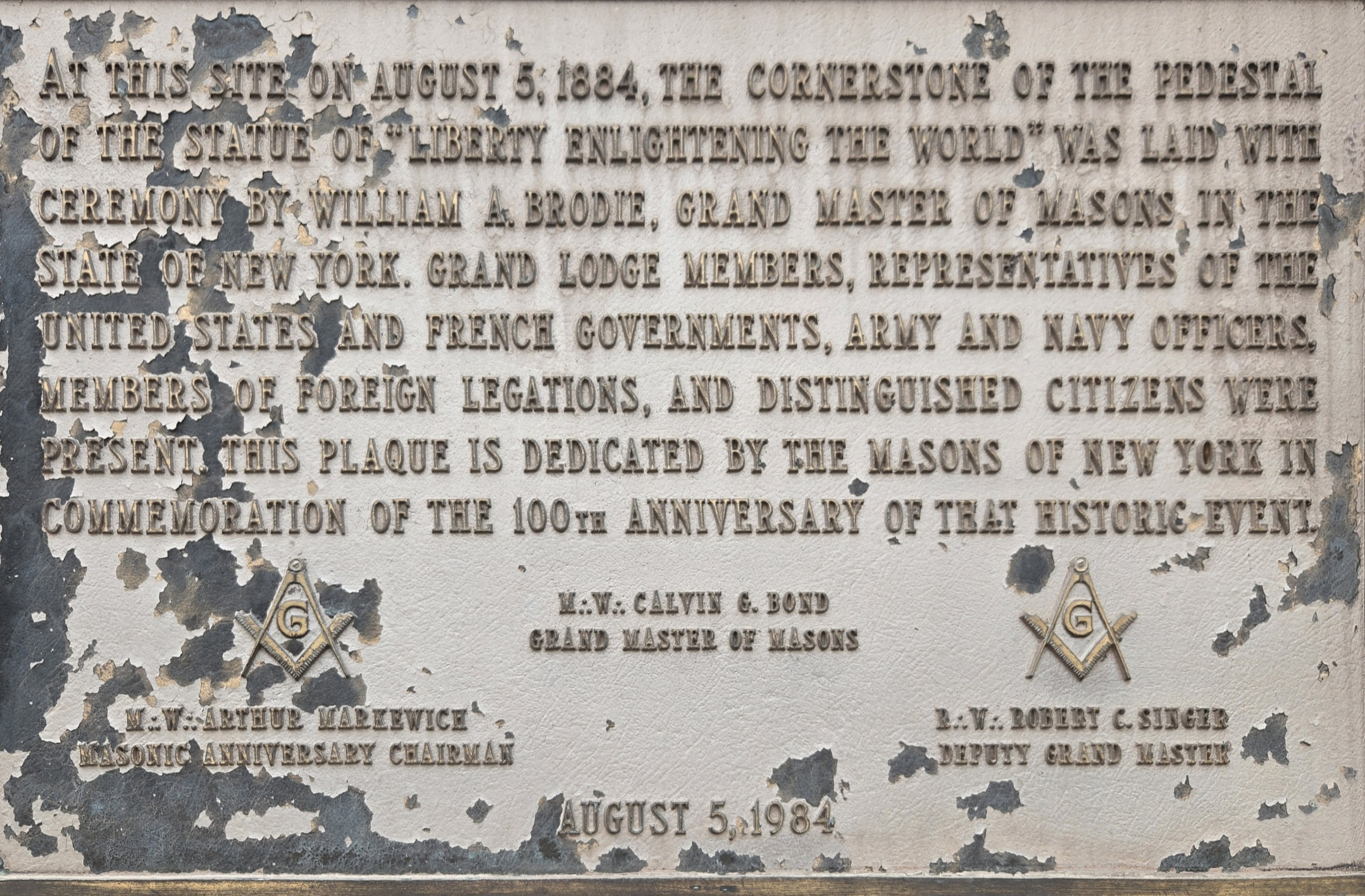
Statue of Liberty plaque with M∴W∴ (Most Worshipful) and R∴W∴ (Right Worshipful).

- A.Dep. – Anno Depositionis ("In the Year of the Deposite"), the date used by Royal and Select Masters
- A∴&A∴ – Ancient and Accepted
- A∴A∴S∴R∴ (sometimes A∴ and A∴ S∴ R∴) - Ancient and Accepted Scottish Rite
- A∴ C∴ - Anno Coadio. Latin, meaning the Year of Destruction; referring to the year 1314 in Knights Templar history.
- A∴F∴M∴ – Ancient Freemasons
- A∴F∴&A∴M∴ – Ancient Free and Accepted Masons
- A∴Inv∴ – Anno Inventionis. "In the Year of the Discovery", the date used by Royal Arch Masons
- A∴L∴ – Anno Lucis, "In the Year of light" the date used by Ancient Craft Masons
- A∴ L∴ G∴ D∴ G∴ A∴ D∴ L'U∴ – À la Gloire du Grand Architecte de L'Univers. "To the Glory of the Grand Architect of the Universe" (French) The usual caption of French Masonic documents.
- A∴ L∴ G∴ D∴ G∴ A∴ D∴ U∴ – A la Gloria del Gran Arquitecto del Universo. "To the Glory of the Grand Architect of the Universe" (Spanish) The usual caption of Spanish Masonic documents.
- A∴ L'O∴ – À L'Orient, "At the East" (French) The seat of the Lodge
- A.M. – Anno Mundi, "In The Year of the World". The date used in the Ancient and Accepted Scottish Rite
- A∴O∴ – Anno Ordinis, "In the Year of the Order". The date allegedly used by Knights Templars
- A∴Y∴M∴ – Ancient York Mason

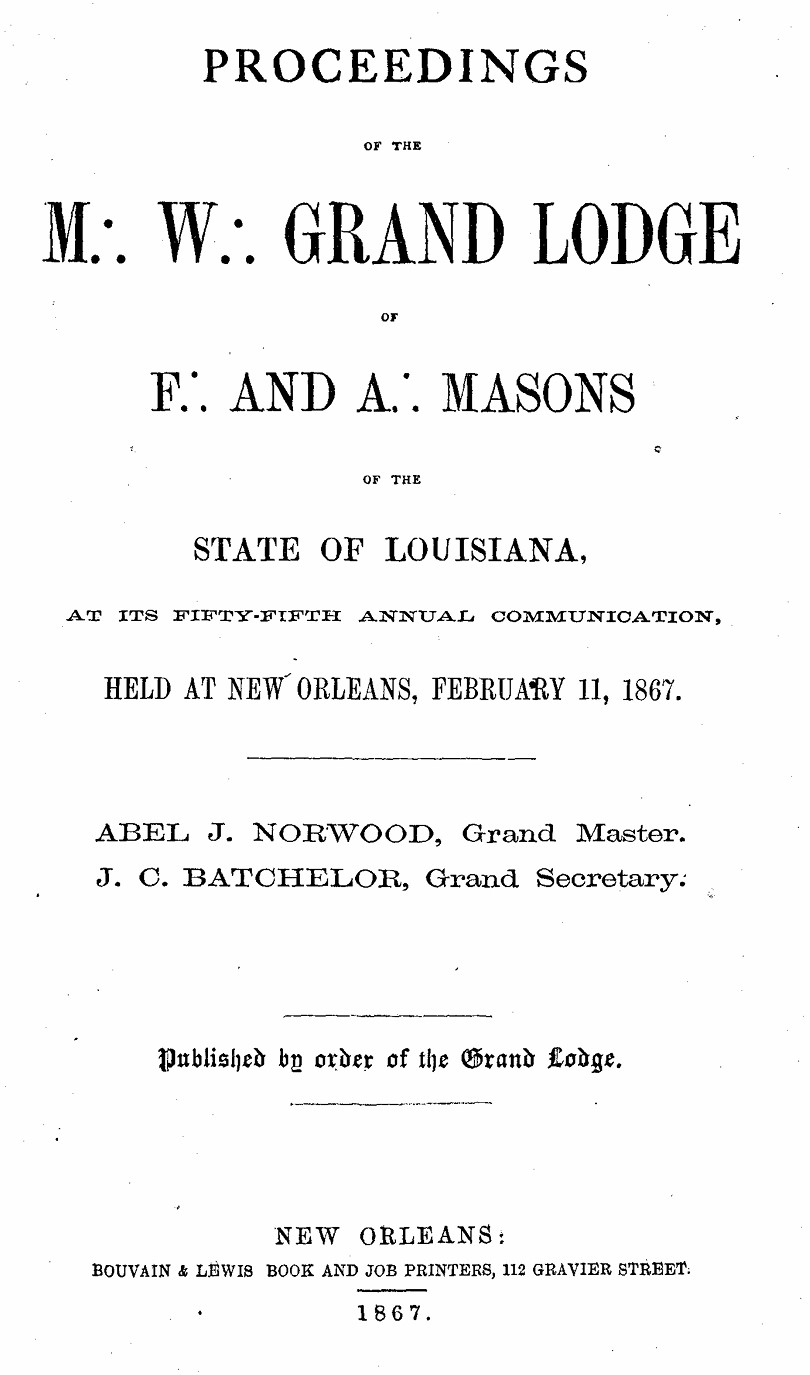
M∴W∴Grand Lodge of F∴ and A∴ Masons of the State of Louisiana, at its Fifty-fifth Annual Communication, held at New Orleans, February 11, 1867. Using the three dots.

=== B ===
- B∴ – Brother in English (sometimes Bro∴) or Bruder. German, meaning Brother.
- BB∴ - Brothers (Plural)
- B∴A∴ - Buisson Ardent. French, meaning Burning Bush.
- B∴ B∴ – Burning Bush.
- Bn∴ – Brudern. German, meaning Brethren.
- B∴L∴ - Blue Lodge.
- B∴ D∴ W∴ P∴ H∴ G∴ S∴ - Beauty, Divinity, Wisdom, Power, Honour, Glory, Strength.
- B∴ L∴ R∴ T∴ - Brotherly Love, Relief and Truth.

=== C ===
- Comp∴ – Companion. Used by Brethren of the Royal Arch.
- C∴C∴ – Celestial Canopy.
- C∴H∴ – Captain of the Host.

=== D ===
- D∴ – Deputy.
- D. and A.F.– Due and Ancient Form.
- D∴ G∴ C∴ - District Grand Chapter
- D∴ D∴ G∴ H∴ P∴ – District Deputy Grand High Priest.
- D∴ D∴ G∴ M∴ – District Deputy Grand Master
- D∴ G∴ M∴ – Deputy Grand Master.
- D∴ G∴ B∴ A∴ W∴ – Der Grosse Baumeister aller Welten, "The Grand Architect of All Worlds" (German)
- D∴ G∴ G∴ H∴ P∴ – Deputy General Grand High Priest.
- D∴ G∴ H∴ P∴ – Deputy Grand High Priest.
- D∴ G∴ M∴ – Deputy Grand Master.
- D∴ M∴ J∴ – Deus Meumque Jus, "God and My Right" (Latin)
- D∴ Prov∴ G∴ M∴ – Deputy Provincial Grand Master.
- Deg. – Degree or Degrees. Another way is as in 33, meaning Thirty-Third Degree. (Although this is more commonly denoted with a degree sign)
- Dist. – District.

=== E ===
- E∴ – Eminent; Excellent; also East.
- E∴A∴ – Entered Apprentice. Sometimes abbreviated E∴ A∴ P∴
- E∴ C∴ – Excellent Companion.
- Ec∴ – Écossais, "Scottish", or belonging to the Scottish Rite (French)
- E∴ G∴ C∴ – Eminent Grand Commander.
- E∴ G∴ M∴ – Early Grand Master.
- E∴ O∴ L∴ – Ex Oriente Lux, "Out of the East comes Light" (Latin).

=== F ===
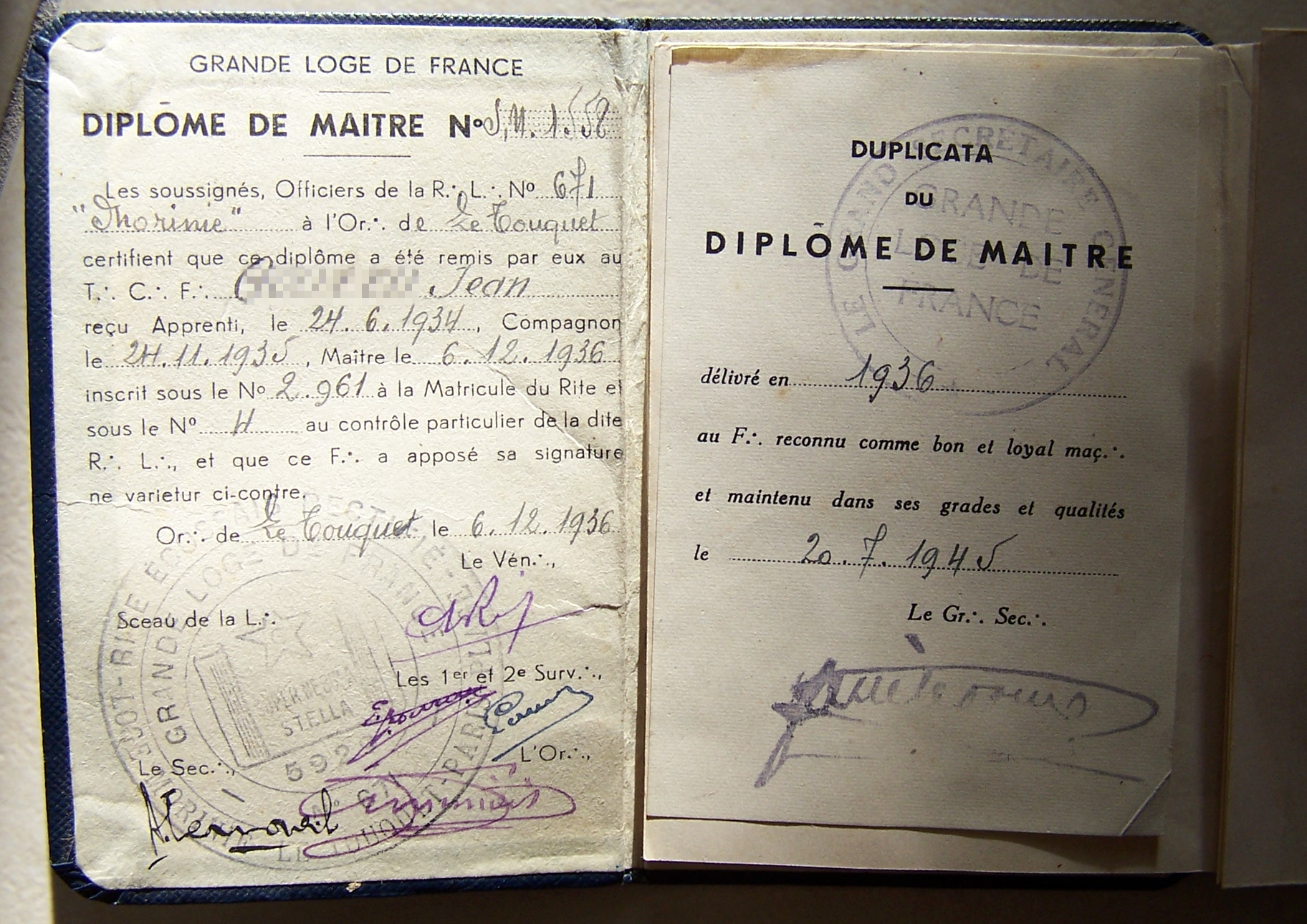
A Masonic document in French using several abbreviations.

- F∴ – Frère, "Brother" (French)
- F.&A.M. – Free and Accepted Masons.
- F∴C∴ – Fellow Craft.
- F∴M∴ – Freemason or Freemasonry.

=== G ===
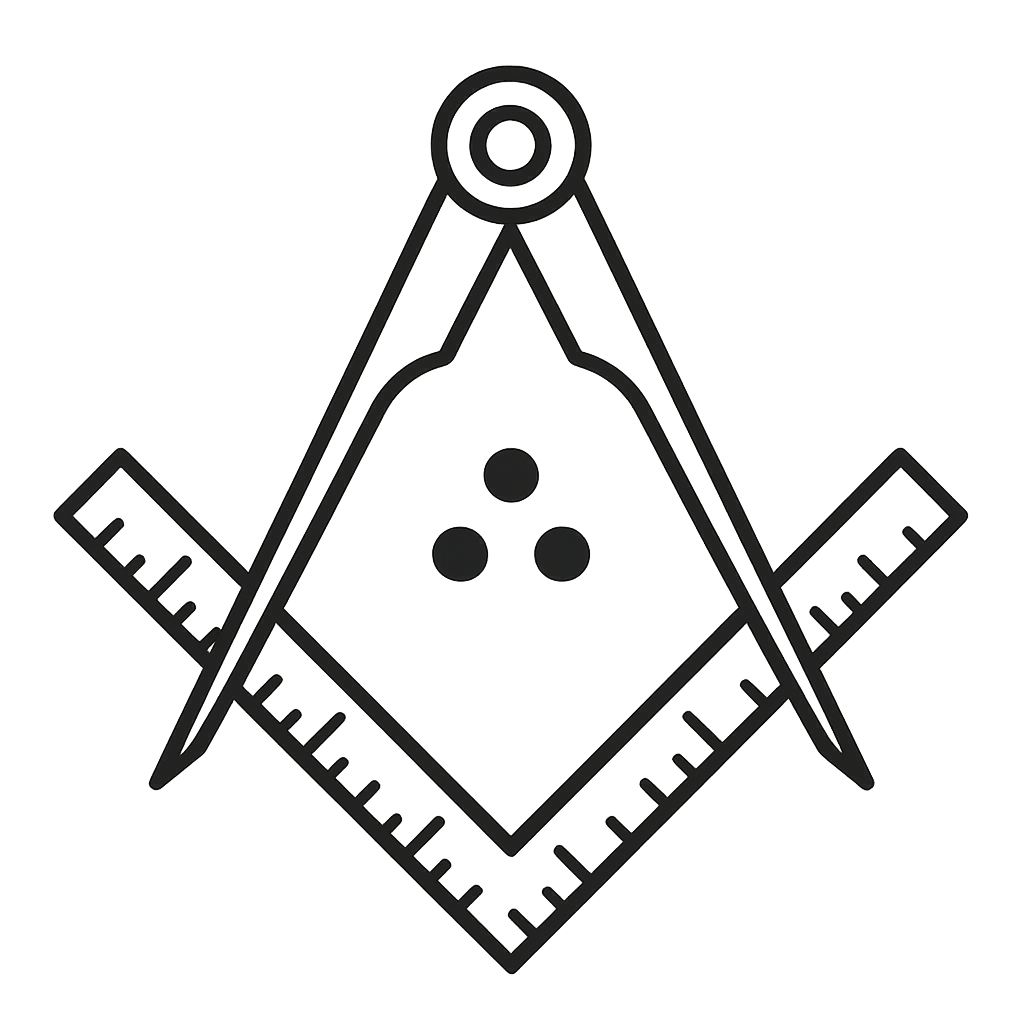
The square and compass with the three dots (∴) at its center. In some variations of the symbol, the three dots are seen at the center of the Square and Compasses.

- G. and G∴ – Depending on the context, refers to God, Great (as in “Great Architect of the Universe”), Grand (as in “Grand Master”), Geometry, Gravitation, Gold, Generation, Genius and Gnosis
- G∴ A∴ O∴ T∴ U∴ – Grand Architect of the Universe.
- G∴ A∴ S∴ – Grand Annual Sojourn.
- G.C.– Grand Chapter; Grand Council; Grand Cross; Grand Commander; Grand Chaplain; Grand Conclave; Grand Conductor; Grand Chancellor.
- G∴ C∴ G∴ – Grand Captain General; Grand Captain of the Guard.
- G ∴ C∴ H∴ – Grand Captain of the Host; Grand Chapter of Heredom.
- G∴ Com∴ – Grand Commandery; Grand Commander.
- G∴ D∴ – Grand Deacon.
- G∴ D∴ C∴ – Grand Director of Ceremonies.
- G∴ E∴ – Grand Encampment; Grand Bast; Grand Ezra.
- G∴ J∴ W∴ – Grand Junior Warden.
- G∴ G∴ C∴ – General Grand Chapter.
- G∴ G∴ H∴ P∴ – General Grand High Priest.
- G∴ G∴ K∴ – General Grand King.
- G∴ G∴ M∴ F∴ V∴ – General Grand Master of the First Veil.
- G∴ G∴ S∴ – General Grand Scribe.
- G∴ G∴ T∴ – General Grand Treasurer.
- G∴ H∴ P∴ – Grand High Priest.
- G∴ K∴ – Grand King.
- G∴ L∴ - Grand Lodge. Grande Loge (French). Grosse Loge (German).
- GG∴ LL∴ Grand Lodges - (Rarely the letter can be tripled for Grand Lodges. GGG∴ LLL∴.)
- G∴ L∴ A∴ – Grand Lodge Above, the afterlife.
- G∴ M∴ – Grand Master; Grand Marshal; Grand Monarch.
- G∴ N∴ – Grand Nehemiah.
- G∴O∴ – Grand Orient; Grand Organist.
- G∴ P∴ – Grand Pursuivant; Grand Prior; Grand Prelate; Grand Preceptor; Grand Preceptory; Grand Patron; Grand Priory; Grand Patriarch; Grand Principal.
- G∴ P∴ S∴ – Grand Principal Sojourner
- G∴ R∴ – Grand Registrar; Grand Recorder.
- G∴ R∴ A∴ C∴ – Grand Royal Arch Chapter.
- G∴ R∴ C∴ – Grand Registry of Canada.
- G∴ S∴ – Grand Scribe; Grand Secretary; Grand Steward.
- G∴ S∴ B∴ – Grand Sword Bearer; Grand Sword Bearer.
- G∴ S∴ E∴ – Grand Scribe Ezra.
- G∴ S∴ N∴ – Grand Scribe Nehemiah.
- G∴ S∴ W∴ – Grand Senior Warden.
- G∴ T∴ – Grand Treasurer; Grand Tyler.

=== H ===
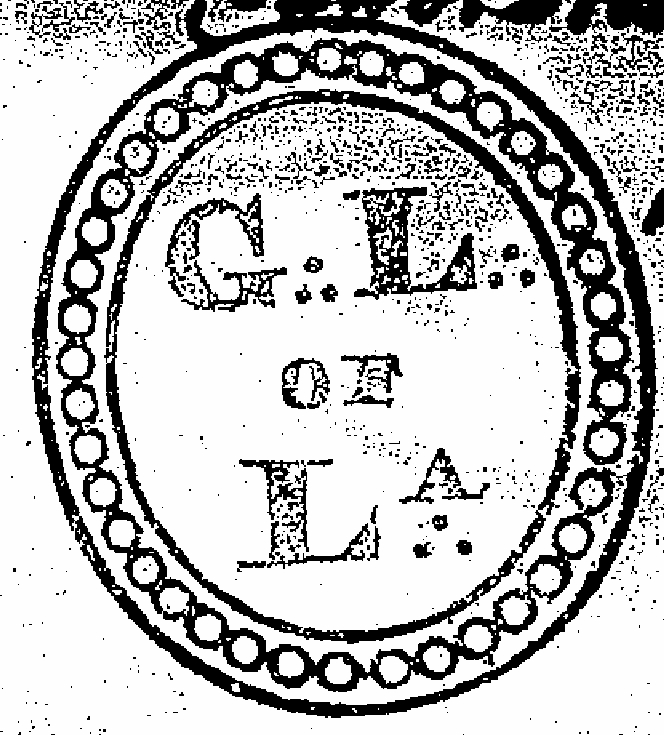
1840: Early Seal of the Grand Lodge of Louisiana

- H∴ A∴ or H∴ A∴ B∴ - Hiram Abif.
- H∴ E∴ – Holy Empire.
- H∴ J∴ – Heilige Johannes, "Holy Saints John" (German - referring jointly to John the Baptist and John the Evangelist)
- H∴ K∴ T∴ – Hiram, King of Tyre.
- H∴ R∴ D∴ M∴ – Heredom.

=== I ===
- Ill∴ – Illustrious.
- I∴ N∴ R∴ I∴ – Iesus Nazarenus, Rex Iudoeorum. Latin, meaning "Jesus of Nazareth, King of the Jews". The Letters are also the initials of a significant sentence in Latin, namely, Igne Natura Renovatur Integra, meaning "By fire nature is perfectly renewed".
- I∴ P∴ M∴ – Immediate Past Master. English title of an official last promoted from the chair.
- I∴ T∴ N∴ O∴ T∴ G∴ A∴ O∴ T∴ U∴ – In the Name of the Grand Architect of the Universe. Often forming the caption of Masonic documents.
- I∴ G∴ - Inner Guard

=== J ===
- J∴ W∴ – Junior Warden.
- J∴ D∴ - Junior Deacon.
- J∴ S∴ - Junior Steward.
- J∴ G∴ W∴ - Junior Grand Warden.

=== K ===
- K∴ – King.
- K∴ E∴ P∴ – Knight of the Eagle and Pelican
- K∴ H∴ – Kadash, Knight of Kadosh.
- K∴ H∴ S∴ – Knight of the Holy Sepulcher
- K∴ M∴ – Knight of Malta
- K∴ S∴ – King Salomon (Suleiman)
- K∴ T∴ – Knights Templar; Knight Templar.
- K∴ R∴ C∴ - Knight of the Rose+Croix

=== L ===
- L∴ – Lodge. Also Lehrling meaning "Apprentice" (German).
- L∴ R∴ – Lonon Rank. A distinction was introduced in England in 1908.
- L∴ V∴ X∴ – Lux. Latin, meaning Light.

=== M ===
- M∴ – Mason; Masonry; Marshal; Mark; Minister; Master. Meister, in German. Maître, in French.
- M∴ C∴ – Middle Chamber.
- M∴ E∴ – Most Eminent; Most Excellent.
- M∴ E∴ G∴ H∴ P∴ – Most Excellent Grand High Priest.
- M∴ E∴ G∴ M∴ – Most Eminent Grand Master (of Knights Templar).
- M∴ E∴ M∴ – Most Excellent Master.
- M∴ E∴ Z∴ – Most Excellent Zerubbabel.
- M∴ K∴ G∴ – Maurer Kunst Geselle. German, meaning Fellow Craft.
- M∴ L∴ – Maurer Lehrling. German, meaning Entered Apprentice.
- M∴ L∴ – Mère Loge. French, meaning Mother Lodge.
- M∴ M∴ – Master Mason. Mois Maçonnique, "Masonic Month" (French): March 18 the first Masonic month among French Freemasons. Also Meister Maurer, "Master Mason" (German)
- M∴ P∴ S∴ – Most Puissant Sovereign.
- M∴ W∴ – Most Worshipful.
- M∴ W∴ G∴ M∴ – Most Worshipful Grand Master; Most Worthy Grand Matron.
- M∴ W∴ G∴ P∴ – Most Worthy Grand Patron.
- M∴ W∴ M∴ – Most Wise Master
- M∴ W∴ S∴ – Most Wise Sovereign

=== N ===
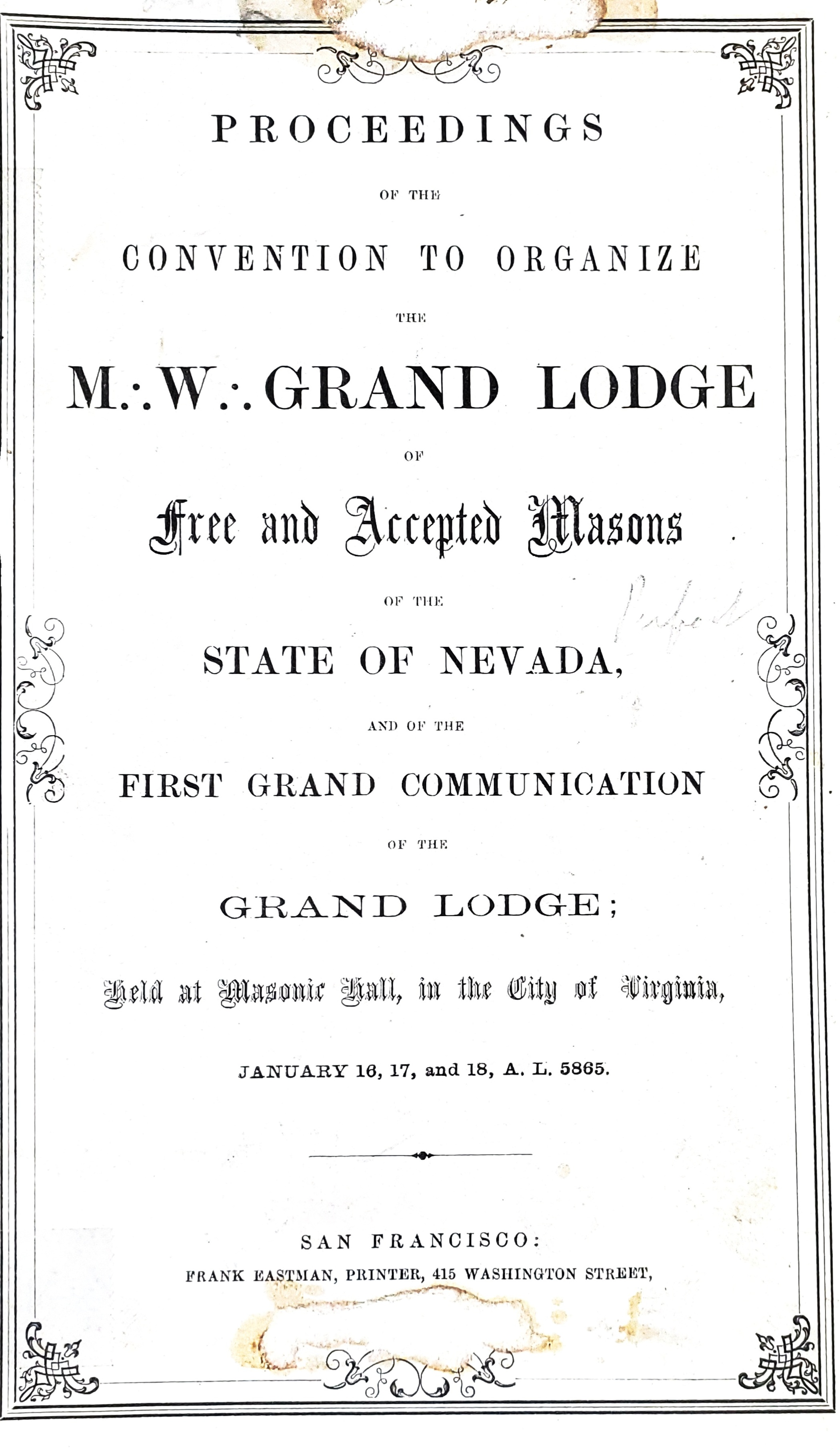
Front cover of the first Grand Lodge proceedings of the Grand Lodge of Nevada in the year 1865 or 5865

- N∴ E∴ C∴ – North-east Corner.
- N'o∴ P∴ V∴ D∴ M∴ – N'oubliez pas vos décorations Maçonniques, "Do not forget your Masonic regalia" (French), a phrase used in France on the corner of a summons.

=== O ===
- O∴ – Orient.
- O∴A∴C∴ – Ordo ab Chao, "Order Out of Chaos" (Latin)
- Ob∴ – Obligation.
- Of∴ – Officer.
- Or∴ - Orator.

=== P ===
- P∴ – Past; Prelate; Prefect; Prior.
- P∴ C∴ W∴ – Principal Conductor of the Work.
- P∴ G∴ M∴ – Past Grand Master; Past Grand Matron.
- P∴ J∴ – Prince of Jerusalem.
- P∴ K∴ – Past King.
- P∴ M∴ – Past Master.
- PPLM - Prepaid (or Paid) Perpetual Life Membership
- P∴ S∴ – Principal Sojourner.
- Pro∴ G∴ M∴ – Pro-Grand Master.
- Prov∴ – Provincial.
- Prov∴ G∴ M∴ – Provincial Grand Master.

=== R ===
- R∴ A∴ – Royal Arch; Royal Art.
- R∴ A∴ C∴ – Royal Arch Captain; Royal Arch Chapter.
- R∴ A∴ M∴ – Royal Arch Mason; Royal Arch Masonry; Royal Ark Mariner. R∴ C∴ or R∴ t∴ Rose Croix. Appended to the signature of one having that degree
- R∴ E∴ – Right Eminent.
- R∴ E∴ A∴ et A∴ – Rite Écossais Ancien et Accepté, "Ancient and Accepted Scottish Rite" (French).
- R∴ L∴ or R∴ []∴ – Respectable Loge (French), or Respectable Logia (Spanish) meaning "Worshipful Lodge"
- R∴ S∴ Y∴ C∴ S∴ – Rosy Cross (in the Royal Order of Scotland).
- R∴ W∴ – Right Worshipful.
- R∴ W∴ M∴ – Right Worshipful Master.

=== S ===
- S∴ – Scribe, Sentinel, Seneschal, Sponsor.
- S∴ D∴ - Senior Deacon.
- S∴ W∴ – Senior Warden.
- S∴ S∴ – Senior Steward.
- Sec∴ – Secretary.
- S∴ C∴ – Supreme Council.
- S∴ F∴ U∴ – Initials for "Salud, Fuerza, y Union", meaning health, strength and union. A valediction used in Spanish speaking jurisdictions.
- S∴ G∴ D∴ – Senior Grand Deacon.
- S∴ G∴ I∴ G∴ – Sovereign Grand Inspector General
- S∴ G∴ W∴ – Senior Grand Warden.
- S∴ M∴ – Secret Master; Substitute Master
- S∴ O∴ – Senior Overseer.
- S∴ P∴ R∴ S∴ – Sublime Prince of the Royal Secret.
- S∴ S∴ – Sanctum Sanctorum, "Holy of Holies" (Latin)
- S∴ S∴ M∴ – Senior Substitute Magus.
- S∴ S∴ S∴ – The initials of the Latin word Salutem, meaning Greeting, repeated thrice and also found similarly in the French, Trois Fois Salut, meaning "Thrice Greeting". A common caption for French Masonic circulars or letters. Similarly found in Spanish Triple Abrazo Fraternal, meaning "Triple Fraternal Hug or Embrace".
- Soc∴ Ros∴ – Societas Rosicruciana
- Soc∴ Ros∴ Civ∴ Fœd∴ - Societas Rosicruciana in Civitatibus Fœderatis
- Sur∴ – Surveillant. French, meaning Warden.

=== T ===
- T∴ A∴ F∴ – Triple Abrazo Fraternal. Spanish, meaning triple fraternal hug or embrace. Similar to S∴ S∴ S∴
- T∴ F∴ A∴ - Triplo Fraterno Abbraccio.

Italian, meaning triple fraternal hug or embrace.

- T∴ C∴ F∴ – Très Cher Frère. French, meaning Very Dear Brother.
- T∴ G∴ A∴ O∴ T∴ U∴ – The Grand Architect of the Universe.
- T∴ S∴ – Tres Sage. Meaning Very Wise, addressed to the presiding officer of French Rite.

=== U ===
- U∴ D∴ – Under Dispensation.

=== V ===
- V∴ or Vén∴ – Vénérable. French, meaning Worshipful.
- V∴ M∴ Venerable Master. Can also be Venerable Maestro (Spanish) the title used for Worshipful Master in Spanish speaking jurisdictions.
- V∴ D∴ B∴ – Very Dear Brother.
- V∴ D∴ S∴ A∴ – Veut Dieu Saint Amour, or Vult Dei Sanctus Animus. A formula used by the Knights Templar. The expression Veut Dieu Saint Amour means "Wishes God Holy Love". Vult Dei Sanctus Animus is the Latin Version of the same phrase.
- V∴ E∴ – Viceroy Eusebius; Very Eminent.
- V∴ F∴ – Vénérable Frère, "Worshipful Brother" (French)
- V∴ L∴ – Vraie Lumière, "True Light" (French)
- V∴ S∴ L∴ – Volume of the sacred Law.
- V∴ W∴ – Very Worshipful

=== W ===
- W∴ – Worshipful
- W∴ M∴ – Worshipful Master or Ehrwürdiger Meister (German)
