= Hezekiah Ford Douglas =

American abolitionist (1831–1865)

Hezekiah Ford Douglas (c. 1831 – 11 November 1865), commonly known as H. Ford Douglas (often spelled "Douglass" on government documents and in newspapers), was an abolitionist who promoted African-American emigration. He was a traveling speaker, political organizer, and newspaper proprietor. He later became the only black officer to command his own unit during the Civil War.

== Biography ==
=== Early life ===
H. Ford Douglas was born into slavery in Virginia, likely to a white father and black mother. He escaped at age 15 to Cleveland, Ohio, making a career as a barber. While he never received any formal education, Douglas was self-educated in classical studies.

=== 1850s: Abolitionism and emigrationism ===
The Fugitive Slave Act passed in 1850, encouraging Douglas to join the growing ranks of black abolitionists who demanded immediate emancipation and complete equality in every sphere of life. He became heavily involved in black state conventions and gained fame as an abolitionist speaker. His positive view of black emigration developed from his increasing conviction that white Americans would never be persuaded to end slavery, let alone recognize blacks as their equals. In 1856, he became a proprietor of The Provincial Freeman, a newspaper published in Canada that served the substantial black community there, including many fugitive slaves who had escaped the U.S. via the Underground Railroad. Although Douglas stayed in Canada for brief periods between 1854 and 1858, he spent most of his time traveling across the U.S. lecturing on the anti-slavery circuit. In 1857, he married Sattira "Sattie" Douglas (née Steele) in Racine, Wisconsin, and the couple made their home in Chicago for the next several years.

=== Civil War and death ===
In 1862, Douglas defied racial restrictions by enrolling in Company G of the 95th Regiment of Illinois Infantry Volunteers before blacks were permitted to serve. After the Emancipation Proclamation allowed blacks to join the regular army, he left his regiment and went to Louisiana to await his new assignment. He devoted his time to lecturing and recruiting black soldiers during a long delay. Finally, in 1865, he was promoted to captain and placed in charge of the Independent Battery, U.S. Colored Light Artillery, at Fort Leavenworth, becoming the only African American to command his own unit during the Civil War.

He died from complications of malaria on November 11, 1865.

== Political views ==
Douglas was a prominent supporter of the emigration movement, which encouraged blacks to move out of the United States to places like West Africa, Canada, and Central America. He was also a critic of the U.S. Constitution, believing support for slavery had been written into it from the beginning. He was a critic of Abraham Lincoln and the Republican Party's inactivity on the issue of slavery.
