= List of numbered roads in Chatham-Kent =

List of numbered municipal roads

This article lists all of the numbered roads in Chatham-Kent, Ontario. Some older road signs (before 1998) still exist on roadsides that still say "Kent County", while newer ones say "C-K Road" instead. Since 2014, Chatham-Kent has re-rehabilitated its busier, former King's Highways to a better standard, and upgraded their speed limits in rural areas to 90 km/h from 80 km/h.

Number	Names	Western/Southern Terminus	Eastern/Northern Terminus	Major Communities	Comments
1	Wheatley Road, Queen Street, Baptiste Road	Dead end at a factory plant just south of Wheatley, Ontario	CR 2	Wheatley, Tilbury	Forms most of the border with Essex County (aside from a small diversion south of Essex County Road 8).
2	Queen's Line, Richmond Street, Keil Drive, Grand Avenue, Longwoods, Road	CR 1 in Tilbury, Ontario (CK-Essex County Line)	CR 121/Elgin County Road 7, just southeast of Bothwell, Ontario at the County Line	Tilbury, Ontario, Chatham, Ontario, Thamesville, Ontario, Bothwell, Ontario	Formerly Highway 2
3	Talbot Trail, Chatham Street	CR 1 in Wheatley, Ontario at the Essex County Line	Elgin County Line	Wheatley, Ontario, Blenheim, Ontario Morpeth, Ontario	Formerly part of Highway 3
4	Coatsworth Road	CR 3, just south of Coatsworth	CR 1, south of Tilbury	Coatsworth, Ontario	
5	King & Whittle Road, Goodreau Line, Stevenson Road	CR 3	CR 1 in Tilbury, Ontario	Stevenson, Ontario	
6	A.D. Shadd Road	CR 3 in Ouvry, Ontario	CR 14 in North Buxton, Ontario	North Buxton, Ontario, South Buxton, Ontario	
7	Merlin Road	CR 3, just east of Port Crewe, Ontario	CR 36 in Prairie Siding, Ontario	Merlin, Ontario	
8	Middle Line, Marlborough Street	CR 1, just south of Tilbury	Intersection with CR 3 and CR 11 in Blenheim, Ontario	Tilbury, Ontario, Merlin, Ontario, Charing Cross, Ontario, Blenheim, Ontario	Formerly Highway 98, turned back in 1970 after Highway 401 was completed.
9	Scane Road	CR 19 just southwest of Ridgetown, Ontario	CR 18		
10	Charing Cross Road, Queen Street	Erie Beach, Ontario, just south of CR 3	CR 45 (Indian Creek Road), Chatham, Ontario	Chatham, Ontario, Charing Cross, Ontario, Erie Beach, Ontario	
11	Communication Road, Chatham Street, New Scotland Line	CR 15 in New Scotland, Ontario	Interchange of Highway 40/Highway 401 (Exit 90)	Blenheim, Ontario, Shrewsbury, Ontario, New Scotland, Ontario	Formerly southern part of Highway 40 (From Highway 401 to Highway 3/CR 3), turned back in 1998.
12	Erieau Road, Mariner's Road	CR 3, 5 km south of Blenheim	Erieau, Ontario	Erieau, Ontario	
14	Port Road, 8th Line, Doyle Line, CReek Road, Garden Road, Pinehurst Line, McKay's Line	CR 3 at Port Alma, Ontario	CR 21	North Buxton, Ontario, Chatham, Ontario	A spur, also named CR 14 leads north along Garden Road to Indian Creek Road (CR 45), continuing north on Creek Road before terminating at Park Avenue (CR 18). This may be an unsigned alternate route (which would normally be signed as 14A), but this is unknown.
15	Base Line, Kent Bridge Road	Highway 40 in Wallaceburg, Ontario	Rondeau Provincial Park Entrance (Concurrent with CR 17)	Wallaceburg, Ontario, Dresden, Ontario, Kent Bridge, Ontario, Rondeau Provincial Park	One of the longest County Roads in Chatham-Kent, Ontario. From Highway 3 (CR 3) to Rondeau Prov. Park, it was also Highway 51, until it was turned back in 1998. Also has a spur of the same name (CR 15) leading along Dawn Mills Road (through Dawn Mills, Ontario), continuing in Lambton County as Lambton CR 15
16	Cairo Road, Tower Road, Main Line, West Bothwell Road	CR 2 (Longwoods Road)	Chatham-Kent/Lambton County Line (Continues as Lambton CR 79)	Bothwell, Ontario	Formerly a part of Highway 79
17	Victoria Road, Main Street, Erie Street, Hill Road, Rose Beach Line	Rondeau Provincial Park Entrance (Concurrent with CR 15)	Intersection of CR 21-17 and Highway 401 (Exit 109) (Continues as C-K CR 21)	Ridgetown, Ontario, Morpeth, Ontario, Rondeau Provincial Park	Formerly part of Highway 21, turned back in 1998 south of Highway 402
18	Park Avenue, Fairview Line, Fysh Line, Selton Line, Littlejohn Road	CR 27 (Bloomfield Road)	CR 2 (Longwoods Road), 3 km south of Bothwell, Ontario	Chatham, Ontario, Thamesville, Ontario, Bothwell, Ontario	Not signed west of Highway 40, but signed as part of the EDR (Emergency Detour Route) for Highway 401, in the event that freeway is closed for any reason.
19	Talbot Street, Ridge Line, Main Street	Intersection with CR 3 and CR 11 in Blenheim	MacPherson Road (Elgin County Line (Continues as Elgin CR 104)	Blenheim, Ontario, Ridgetown, Ontario, Highgate, Ontario	Also had a spur until the late 1990s, CR 19A
19A	Front Line	Intersection of CR 19 and CR 17 in Ridgetown, Ontario (Continues as C-K CR 19)	Kenesserie Road (Continues as C-K CR 19.	Ridgetown, Ontario	Now part of CR 19.
20	Orford Road, King Street, Bury Road	CR 3	CR 18	Highgate, Ontario	
21	Irish School Road, North Street, Community Road, Base Line, Industrial Road, Victoria Street, Victoria Road	Intersection of CR 21-17 and Highway 401 (Exit 109) (Continues as C-K CR 17)	Chatham-Kent/Lambton County Line (Continues as Lambton CR 21)	Dresden, Ontario, Thamesville, Ontario	Formerly part of Highway 21. Parts south of Highway 402 were turned back in 1998
22	Lambton Line, Cairo Road, Tower Road, Main Line, Main Street, Peter Street, Peter Road	CR 26/Lambton County Line in Florence, Ontario	CR 2 (Longwoods Road), just south of Bothwell	Florence, Ontario, Bothwell, Ontario	Continues in Lambton County as Lambton CR 22 (Before looping back into Kent County, as CR 25). Has Dual-designation as C-K Road 22 and Lambton Road 22.
23	Jane Road, Jane Street	CR 21 (Industrial Road)	CR 22 (Lambton Line)	Thamesville, Ontario	
24	Zone Center Line, Elm Street	CR 23	CR 22 in Bothwell, Ontario	Bothwell, Ontario	
25	Oakdale Road	CR 21	Kent Line (road acting as Chatham-Kent/Lambton County Line)	Croton, Ontario	Continues as Lambton CR 22, looping back towards Florence, Ontario as C-K CR 22
26	Florence Road	CR 21	CR 22	Florence, Ontario	Continues in Lambton County as Lambton CR 22
27	Bloomfield Road	CR 3 (Talbot Trail)	CR 36 (River View Line)	Chatham, Ontario	Signed as part of EDR (Emergency Detour Route)
28	Tupperville Road, Center Side Road	CR 2 (Longwoods Road)	CR 78 (McCreary Line), halfway between Dresden, Ontario and Wallaceburg, Ontario	Tupperville, Ontario	
29	Countryview Line, Lindsay Road, Cedar Hedge Line, North Street, Croton Line	Highway 40 at Oungah, Ontario	CR 25 at Croton, Ontario	Dresden, Ontario, Croton, Ontario	Has a spur, CR 29A
29A	Countryview Line	Intersection of CR 28 and CR 29	CR 15	Dresden, Ontario, Dawn Mills, Ontario	Spur of CR 29
30	Prince Albert Road	Intersection of Communication Road / Grand Avenue (Highway 40) and CR 2 (Longwoods Road)	CR 29 (Countryview Line)	Basically an extension of Communication Road	
31	Kimball Road	CR 78, just east of Wallaceburg	Kent Line (Chatham-Kent/Lambton County Boundary)	Wallaceburg, Ontario	Continues in Lambton County as CR 31
32	Techumseh Road	Walpole Island/Walpole Island Indian Reservation	CR 33 (Payne Road)	Walpole Island	Main access into Walpole Island
33	Dufferin Avenue, Payne Road, St. Clair Parkway	Whitebread Line (Chatham-Kent/Lambton County Boundary)	Highway 40 in Wallaceburg	Walpole Island, Wallaceburg, Ontario	Continues in Lambton County as the St. Clair Parkway (Lambton CR 33). Former alignment of Highway 40, turned back in sections: From Sombra to Walpole Island in 1980, and from Walpole Island to Wallaceburg in 1984.
34	Grande River Line, Grand Avenue	CR 35 (Jacob Road)	CR 2 (Keil Drive)	Chatham, Ontario, Prairie Siding, Ontario	Also has a spur along Winter Line Road, travelling north-west through Paincourt, Ontario ("Pain Court, Ontario" on signs), terminating at CR 42 (Bay Line) east of Mitchell's Bay, Ontario.
35	Jacob Road, Pain Court Line, St. Andrew's Line	CR 36 (River View Line/Techumseh Line) in Prairie Siding, Ontario	CR 28 in Eberts, Ontario	Prairie Siding, Ontario, Paincourt, Ontario	Has an operational signalized drawbridge across the Thames River
36	Tecumseh Line, River View Line	CR 1 (Baptiste Road) in Jeannette's Creek, Ontario	CR 2 (Keil Drive)	Jeannette's Creek, Ontario, Prairie Siding, Ontario, Chatham, Ontario	Continues as Essex CR 2
37	Rivard Line	Town Line Road	CR 43		
38	Mull Road	CR 19	CR 18		
39	Colborne Street, River Line	Highway 40 (Communication Road)	CR 15 (Kent Bridge Road)	Chatham, Ontario, Kent Bridge, Ontario	
40	Freedom Road, Park Street	CR 15	CR 21	Dresden, Ontario	Freedom Road was called Uncle Tom's Road until mid-2022.
42	Bay Line, Electric Line, Oldfield Line	Mitchell's Bay, Ontario	CR 15 just south of Tupperville, Ontario	Mitchell's Bay, Ontario, Electric, Ontario, Oldfield, Ontario	Main road to Mitchell's Bay
43	Bear Line Road	CR 34 (Grande River Line)	CR 42 (Bay Line/Electric Line)	Bearline, Ontario, Chatham, Ontario	
44	Mandaumin Road	CR 78 (McCreary Line)	Kent Line (Chatham-Kent/Lambton County Boundary)		Continues as Lambton CR 26
45	Indian Creek Road	CR 10 (Charing Cross Road)	CR 14 (Creek Road/Garden Road)	Chatham, Ontario	
78	McCreary Line	Highway 40	CR 21	Wallaceburg, Ontario, Dresden, Ontario	Formerly Highway 78, turned back in 1998.
121	MacEwen Street, MacEwen Line, Clachan Road, Turin Line, Duart Road	CR 3 in Clearville, Ontario	Bothwell, Ontario, Clachan, Ontario, Duart, Ontario, Clearville, Ontario	Straddles the Chatham-Kent/Middlesex County and Elgin County Boundaries. Dual Designation of Elgin CR 7, and of Middlesex CR 14. Formerly numbered as CR 21 until Highway 21 was turned back.	
