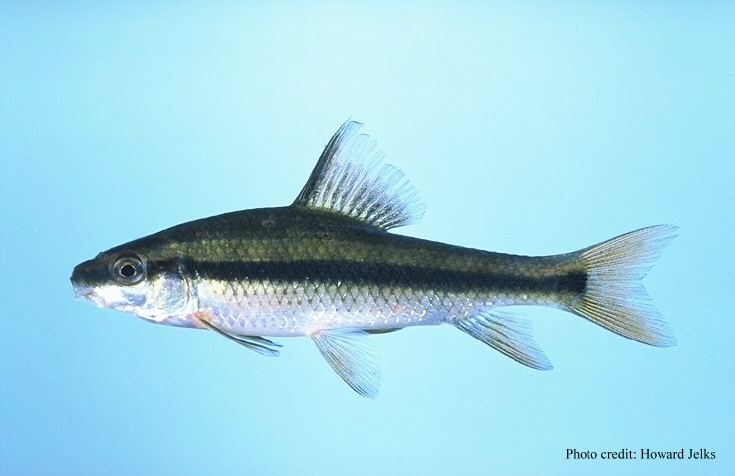

Conservation status
- Least Concern (IUCN 3.1)

Scientific classification
- Kingdom: Animalia
- Phylum: Chordata
- Class: Actinopterygii
- Division: Teleostei
- Order: Cypriniformes
- Family: Catostomidae
- Genus: Erimyzon
- Species: E. sucetta

Binomial name
- Erimyzon sucetta (Lacépède, 1803)

Synonyms
- Cyprinus sucetta Lacepède, 1803

= Lake chubsucker =

Species of fish

The lake chubsucker (Erimyzon sucetta) is a species of freshwater fish endemic to North America, found in the Great Lakes and the Mississippi River basin, as far north as Ontario, Canada, extending south to the Gulf of Mexico. It is mainly found in lakes, ponds, and swamps, rarely in streams.

The fish is an intermediate level consumer that feeds on benthic detritus, specifically on microcrustacea and midge larvae. Its average length is 25.8 cm. E. sucetta reportedly scatters its eggs randomly over aquatic vegetation and submerged grass in ponds or over gravelly areas cleared by males.

While not in acute danger, the chubsucker faces habitat disturbance due to siltation caused by agricultural practices as well as coal ash spills. Its range has declined in Missouri, Arkansas, Ohio, and possibly Tennessee.

== Geographic distribution ==
The lake chubsucker is found in North America in the Great Lakes and Mississippi River basin lowlands. Its range extends from southern Ontario to the Gulf of Mexico, west to Wisconsin and Texas, and east to Southern Virginia and South Florida. In the US it has been extirpated from areas of Southern Illinois, Iowa, and Pennsylvania. It is also declining in abundance in Missouri, Arkansas, Tennessee, and Ohio.

This decline in abundance is largely due to habitat modification or destruction, such as changing the level of turbidity of the water, changing sedimentation levels, introducing exotic, invasive species, altering nutrient levels, and introducing toxins. In some of these areas, it is possible that the fish is still around in small numbers, but it is very difficult to collect and therefore hard to establish extirpation conclusively.

In Canada the fish is thought to have been extirpated from Jeanette's Creek and areas of Big Creek and Tea Creek.

== Ecology ==
The lake chubsucker is found in warmer waters, approximately 28°- 34 °C. Other specifications include clear, still water, with low turbidity. A high level of vegetative cover is also often present, often more than 70% coverage. Wetlands, ponds, and floodplain lakes are areas where the chubsucker is typically found. It is a benthic fish, preferring shallow, freshwater. They are found where the lakes have sand or silt mixed with organic debris.

The chubsucker is an omnivore, eating both vegetation and invertebrates, such as small crustaceans, chironomid larvae, and algae. Vegetation can make up to 70% of its diet. When chubsuckers are small (83–103mm) filamentous algae had a 100% occurrence, cladocerans and chironomid larvae had a 25%, and copepods a 13% occurrence. However, when they are larger, (127–152mm) copepods becomes more important with a 50% occurrence, followed by algae with a 25% occurrence, and cladocera, ostracods, and chironomid larvae all had 13% occurrences.

The fish's predators include largemouth bass (Micropterus salmoides), and other basses. Humans have the power to interfere with the chubsucker, particularly when it comes to coal combustion. Studies performed by Snodgrass et al. showed that although mortality rates did not necessarily significantly increase in the presence of coal combustion by-products, altered swimming performance, as well as increased toxin levels given less food availability, were both side effects of living in contaminated waters. Other activities, such as building dams, which dramatically changes the siltation levels of the chubsucker habitat, also negatively affect the abundance of the fish.

== Life history ==
This fish breeds in late March and continues until early July, and in individual areas the breeding period lasts about two weeks. The eggs are spread either over vegetation or in gravelly areas, which have been previously cleared by the male. The number of eggs varies between 3000 and 20,000. Its eggs hatch after one week and the juveniles become sexually mature at three, while its lifespan generally ranges five to six years.

Juveniles and first-time breeders are most sensitive to changes in the environment, as are often caused by humans, such as diverting rivers, and thereby changing turbidity of the water. Increased siltation also hit these two stages the hardest as such activity changes the substrates on which the fish breeds, as well as where the small juveniles are trying to survive.

== Management ==
This fish species is not currently listed as threatened or endangered, and the populations in the southern United States are thought to be secure. Because of this, it is somewhat difficult to find management plans for this species. There has been research done to determine its usefulness in improving the growth of largemouth bass, a popular sporting fish, though it does not seem to be able to sustain the predator by itself. Since the fish is secure throughout 50% of its range, states like Alabama have listed it as a fish species of lowest concern. There are some areas where the chubsucker has been extirpated, or is at least thought to be, such as in New York. According to their website, New York management includes trying to find extant populations if they are still present.

The most important cause of the fish's decline in abundance would appear to be siltation due to human practices of agriculture. There do not appear to be any refuges or conservation easements specific to the lake chubsucker as it is not considered endangered. In Canada some research was conducted to determine how the lake chubsucker was faring, since it has been extirpated in several areas. With no further harm and no recovery efforts, it was suggested that the extant lake chubsucker populations would reach minimum viable population standards in about 12 years.

Populations of E. sucetta in Louisiana, Mississippi, Alabama, and Georgia, are listed as secure; Michigan's is ranked as apparently secure, Texas, Oklahoma, Tennessee, North Carolina, Indiana, and Wisconsin are listed as vulnerable, and the populations of Arkansas, Missouri, Illinois, Kentucky, Ohio, Virginia, and Ontario are imperiled. The fish is presumed extirpated in Iowa and Pennsylvania.
