= Maxwell Creek (Chatham-Kent) =

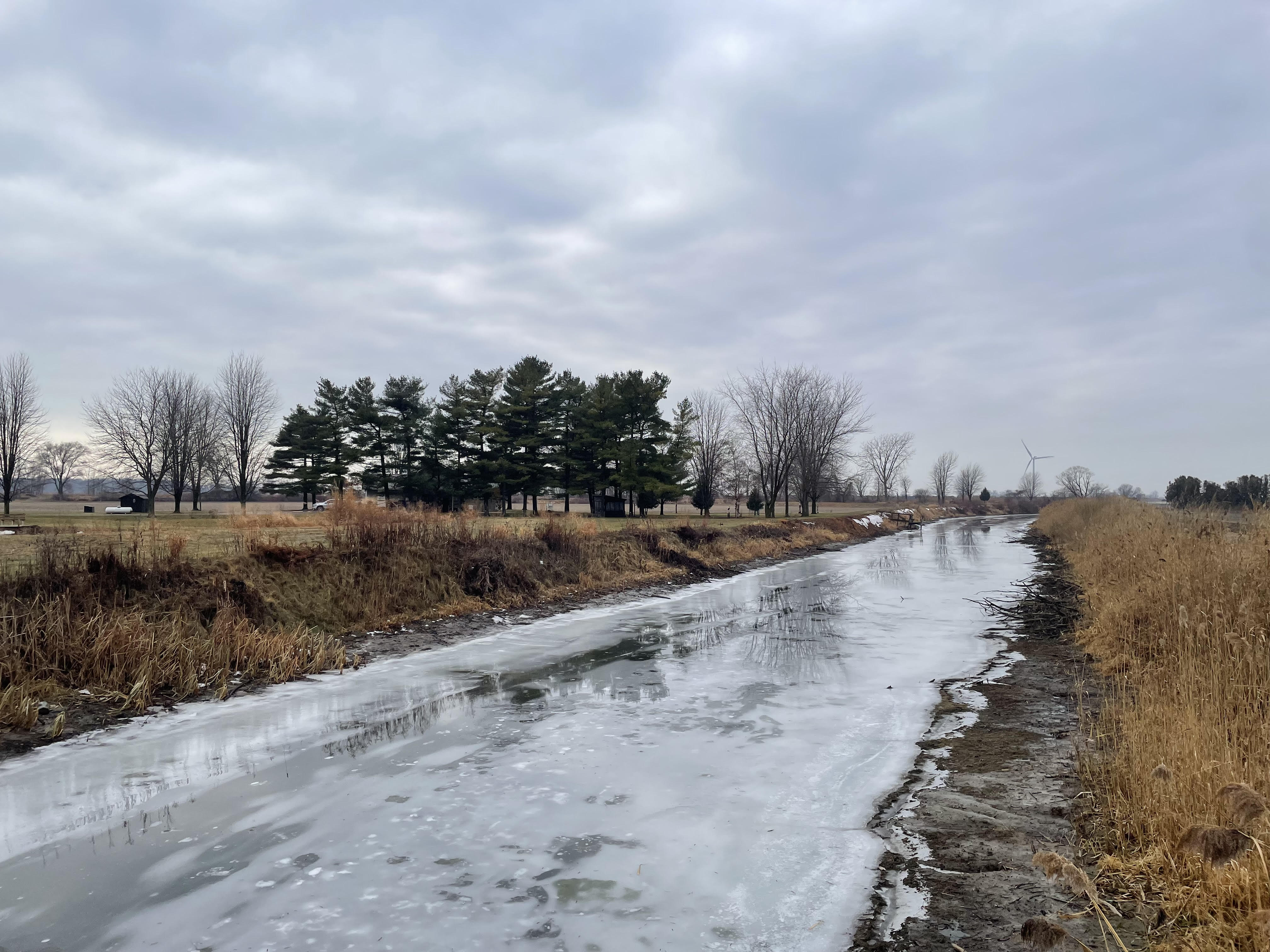
- Maxwell Creek running southwest from Baldoon Road

- Location of the mouth of Maxwell Creek in Southern Ontario

Location
- Country: Canada
- Province: Ontario
- Region: Southwestern Ontario
- Municipality: Chatham-Kent

Physical characteristics
- Source: Unnamed field
  - coordinates: 42°34′48″N 82°15′44″W
  - elevation: 179 m (587 ft)
- Mouth: Chenail Ecarté (The Snye)
  - coordinates: 42°31′53″N 82°24′07″W
  - elevation: 177 m (581 ft)

Basin features
- River system: Great Lakes Basin

Maxwell Creek is a stream in the municipality of Chatham-Kent in Southwestern Ontario, Canada. It is part of the Great Lakes Basin and is a left tributary of the Chenail Ecarté (The Snye).

The creek begins in an unnamed field at an elevation of 179 metres (587 ft), southeast of the community of Tupperville. It flows southwest, then turns west near the community of Oldfield, passes under Ontario Highway 40, and reaches its mouth at the Chenail Ecarté (The Snye), a distributary of the St. Clair River that flows to Lake St. Clair, at an elevation of 177 metres (581 ft). The Chenail Ecarté (The Skye) flows via Lake St. Clair and the Detroit River to Lake Erie.
