= North Sydenham River =

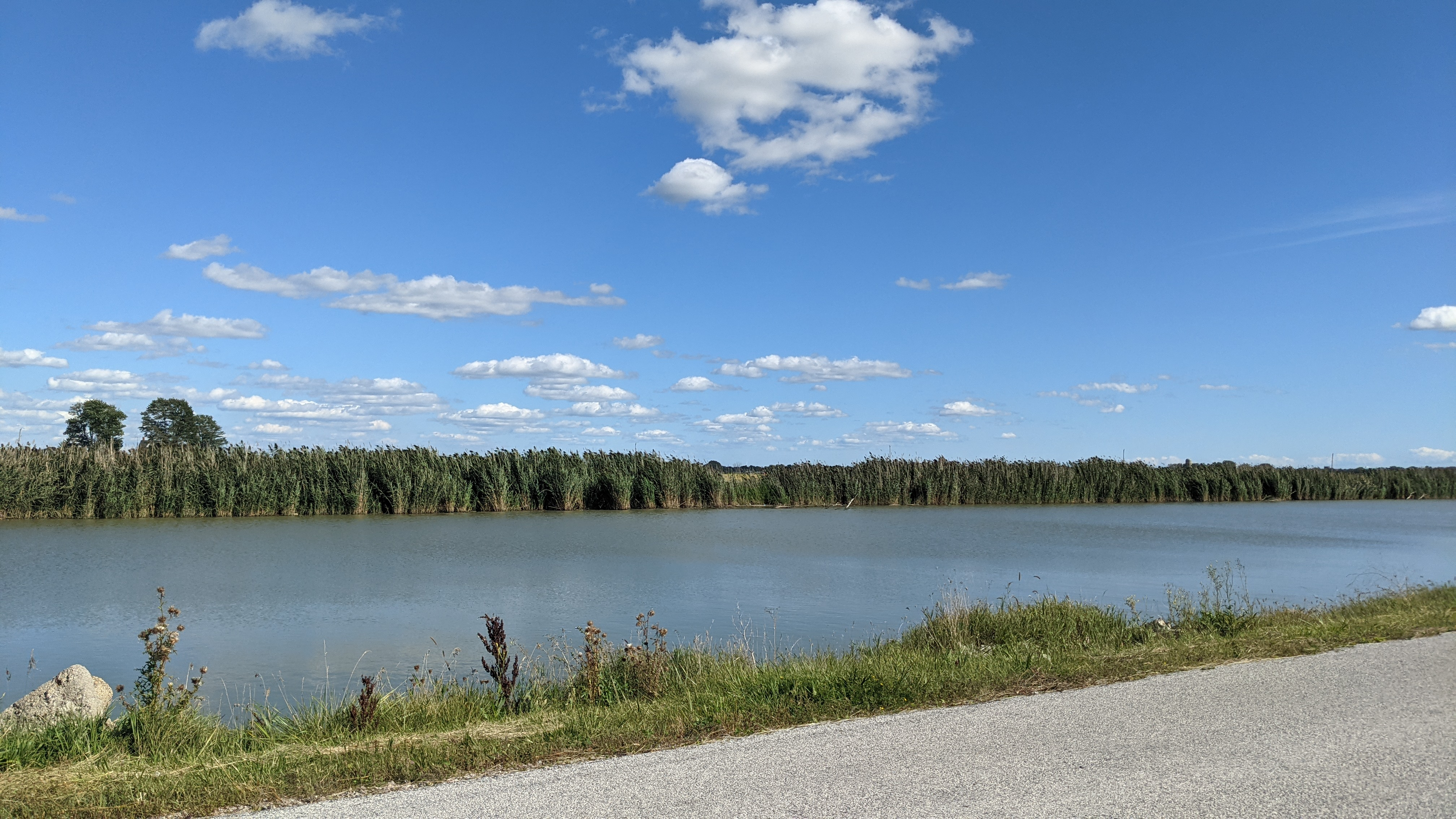

- Location of the mouth of the North Sydenham River in Southern Ontario

Location
- Country: Canada
- Province: Ontario
- Region: Southwestern Ontario
- Municipalities: Chatham-Kent; Saint Clair

Physical characteristics
- Source: confluence of Bear Creek and Black Creek
  - coordinates: 42°43′42″N 82°21′04″W
  - elevation: 177 m (581 ft)
- Mouth: Sydenham River
  - coordinates: 42°35′41″N 82°22′53″W
  - elevation: 175 m (574 ft)

Basin features
- River system: Great Lakes Basin
- Tributaries
  - right: Running Creek

The North Sydenham River is a river in the municipalities of Saint Clair (Lambton County) and Chatham-Kent (formerly in Kent County) in Southwestern Ontario, Canada. It is a tributary of the Sydenham River, and is part of the Great Lakes Basin.

The creek begins in St. Clair at the confluence of Bear Creek (right) and Black Creek (left), at an elevation of 177 metres (581 ft), east of the community of Wilkesport. It flows first southwest, then southeast, then heads south. The river enters Chatham-Kent, takes in the right tributary Running Creek, and reaches its mouth at the Sydenham River, at an elevation of 175 metres (574 ft), at the community of Wallaceburg. The Sydenham River flows via the Chenail Ecarté (The Snye), Lake St. Clair and the Detroit River to Lake Erie.

== Tributaries ==
- Source confluence
  - Bear Creek (right)
  - Black Creek (left)
- Indian Creek (right)
- Goodens Creek (right)
- Ryans Creek (left)
- Running Creek (right)
- Otter Creek (left)
