= Ontario Highway 51 =

Former Ontario provincial highway

King's Highway 51
- Kent Bridge Road, Wildwood Line; Chatham–Kent Road 15

Route information
- Maintained by the City of Chatham–Kent
- Length: 5.8 km (3.6 mi)
- Existed: April 9, 1970–April 1, 1997

Major junctions
- South end: Rondeau Provincial Park (Evangeline Street)
- North end: Municipal Road 3 (Talbot Road)

Location
- Country: Canada
- Province: Ontario
- Divisions: Chatham–Kent
- Towns: New Scotland, Rondeau Park

Highway system
- Ontario provincial highways; Current; Former; 400-series
← Highway 49	→ Highway 58
Former provincial highways
← Highway 50	Highway 52 →

King's Highway 51, commonly referred to as Highway 51, was a provincially maintained highway in the Canadian province of Ontario that connected Highway 3 in Eatonville with Rondeau Provincial Park. An earlier designation existed south of Orangeville, connecting Highway 24 with Highway 10 in Caledon Village. This iteration was assumed in 1938, but later renumbered as Highway 24 In 1961. The more recent incarnation of the route number was assumed in 1970, but then decommissioned in 1997 and transferred to what is now the city of Chatham-Kent.

== Route description ==
Highway 51 was a short connector road that served to link Highway 3 to Rondeau Provincial Park. At its southern terminus, the highway began at the entrance gates to the provincial park, proceeding northeast through a small community of recreational cottages. The highway exited the park and turned north onto what is now Chatham–Kent Road 15. From here the highway progressed straight north to Highway 3, passing through the community of New Scotland along the way. Trees continue to line both sides of this section of the highway, with farmland sprawling out beyond that.

== History ==
In 1961, the section of Highway 24 between Highway 51 and Orangeville was renumbered as Highway 136; Highway 51 was renumbered as Highway 24 and the latter signed concurrently with Highway 10 north to Orangeville. On April 9, 1970, the road from Eatonville to Rondeau Provincial Park was designated as Highway 51. This iteration of the route remained unaltered until April 1, 1997, when it was transferred to Kent County, now the City of Chatham–Kent. It was subsequently designated as Chatham–Kent Road 15.

== Major intersections ==
The following table lists the major junctions along Highway 51, as noted by the Ministry of Transportation of Ontario. The entire route is located in Chatham–Kent.

Location	km	mi	Destinations	Notes
Rondeau Park	0.0	0.0	Evangeline Street	Entrance gates to Rondeau Provincial Park
Rondeau Park	1.0	0.62	Municipal Road 17 (Rose Beach Line)	
New Scotland	3.7	2.3	Municipal Road 11 (New Scotland Line)	
Eatonville	5.8	3.6	Municipal Road 3 (Talbot Trail)	Formerly Highway 3
1.000 mi = 1.609 km; 1.000 km = 0.621 mi
