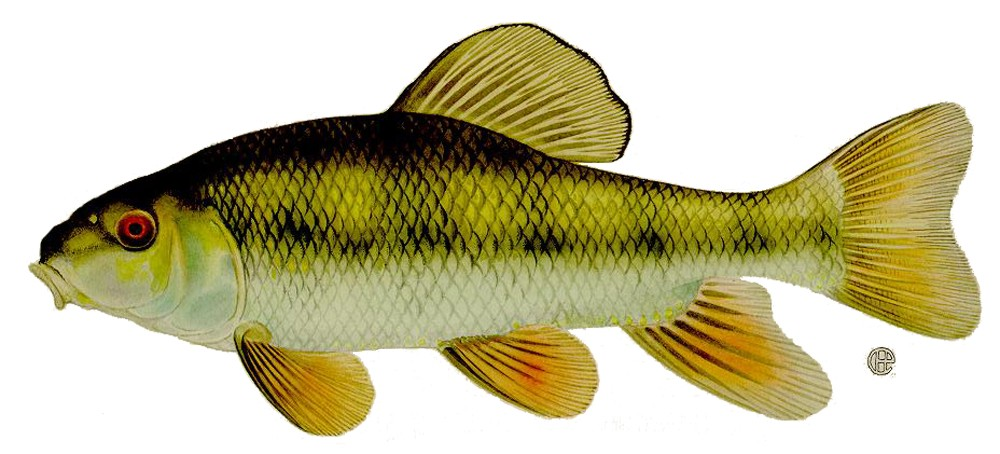

Conservation status
- Least Concern (IUCN 3.1)

Scientific classification
- Kingdom: Animalia
- Phylum: Chordata
- Class: Actinopterygii
- Order: Cypriniformes
- Family: Catostomidae
- Genus: Erimyzon
- Species: E. oblongus

Binomial name
- Erimyzon oblongus (Mitchill, 1814)

Synonyms
- Cyprinus oblongus (Mitchill, 1814); Catostomus gibbosus (Lesueur, 1817); Catostomus tuberculatus (Lesueur, 1817); Catostomus vittatus (Lesueur, 1817); Erimyzon sucetta subsp. oblongus (Mitchill, 1814); Labeo elegans (DeKay, 1842); Labeo elongatus (DeKay, 1842); Labeo esopus (DeKay, 1842)

= Creek chubsucker =

Species of freshwater fish

The creek chubsucker (Erimyzon oblongus) is a freshwater fish of the sucker family (Catostomidae).

== Description ==
The creek chubsucker is one of three species in the genus Erimyzon from the family Catostomidae present in eastern North America, and is found primarily in one of two disjunct populations; either in the eastern Coastal Plain streams or in the mid-western streams east of the Central Plains. The creek chubsucker is typically found in vegetated rocky riffle areas, runs, and pools of clear freshwater.

The creek chubsucker is small in size, typically measuring less than 10 inches (25 cm) and weighing slightly under a pound. There is generally no sexual dimorphism exhibited between males and females and lifespan is typically from five to seven years. However, dimorphism does exist between juveniles and adults, with juveniles displaying a uniform, dark lateral stripe down the sides.

Both sexes exhibit longitudinal scale rows, 4–18 dorsal fin rays, an air bladder with two chambers, dorsal fin base less than one-fourth standard length, and lateral line absent. During breeding, the males grow horn-like tubercles, become more brightly colored, and are territorial of gravel substrates in shallow water areas. The fish are bottom feeders and often turn over rocks when foraging on microcrustacea, aquatic insects, and some algae.

It is believed that the creek chubsucker and other members of the family Catostomidae diverged from carps (Cyprinidae) at least fifty million years ago. The creek chubsucker is not considered a game fish, and is not commercially important to humans. Creek chubsucker young and eggs are considered important forage for piscivorous game fishes and are therefore important to the sustainability of these game fishes for recreational and sporting enthusiasts. As of 2004, the conservation status of creek chubsucker was of least concern, but the species is still adversely affected by anthropogenic factors such as dams, pollution, and over siltation.

== Geographic distribution ==
Creek chubsuckers are one of about sixty-two species of in the family Catostomidae. All but two species are endemic to North America, and creek chubsuckers can be found in many of the freshwater tributaries of the Atlantic slope streams from Maine to Altamaha drainage of Georgia; Gulf slope streams east to Escambia River drainage, Alabama (single population), west to San Jacinto system Texas, Mississippi Valley in Louisiana, Arkansas, southeast Oklahoma, upland Missouri, Mississippi, west Tennessee, West Kentucky, and south of the Great Lakes drainage in southern tributaries to lakes Michigan, Erie, and Ontario.

There is a disjunction between the eastern and western populations with no records of the species being present in the waterways from Florida northward along the Appalachian Mountain corridor. The creek chubsucker adults occur commonly in pools in sluggish streams, spring pools, and backwater areas, while juveniles can be found in head water rivulets. During the breeding season, congregations of breeding males and females migrate upstream and, can be found on clean rubble or gravel beds and less commonly on sandy or vegetated shallow water beds. Some populations are in decline where siltation pollution is evident.

== Taxonomy ==
Three subspecies have been described:

- Erimyzon oblongus oblongus (Mitchill) - northeastern subspecies, typically with 11–12 dorsal rays
- Erimyzon oblongus claviformis (Girard) - formerly regarded as the western subspecies, typically with 10–11 dorsal rays, but now recognized as a separate species, Erimyzon claviformis (Girard, 1856)
- Erimyzon oblongus connectens Hubbs, 1930 - endemic to the Altamaha River system in Georgia, although later authors do not recognize this subspecies and regard it as a population that intergrades the northeastern and western subspecies

== Ecology ==
The creek chubsucker is a bottom feeding forager in freshwater streams. The adults are generally solitary, and can be found near the substrate of slowly flowing streams where they forage for food. Most of the prey items making up the creek chubsucker's diet include microcrustacea (Copepod, Cladocera, etc.), organic detritus, algae, diatoms, small clams, Chironomidae larvae and Diptera larvae.

A majority of juvenile life is spent in mixed schools with other Cyprinidae in midwater areas. Creek chubsucker juveniles are thought to be an important forage species for game fish like Esox and Centrarchidae, but their rapid growth rate usually ensures escape from predatory fish and assures an annual recruitment of young.

The creek chubsucker shares habitat with and requires similar spawning sites as white suckers (Catostomus commersoni) and northern hogsuckers (Hypentelium nigracans). This inadvertently leads to competition of space and resources.

== Life history ==
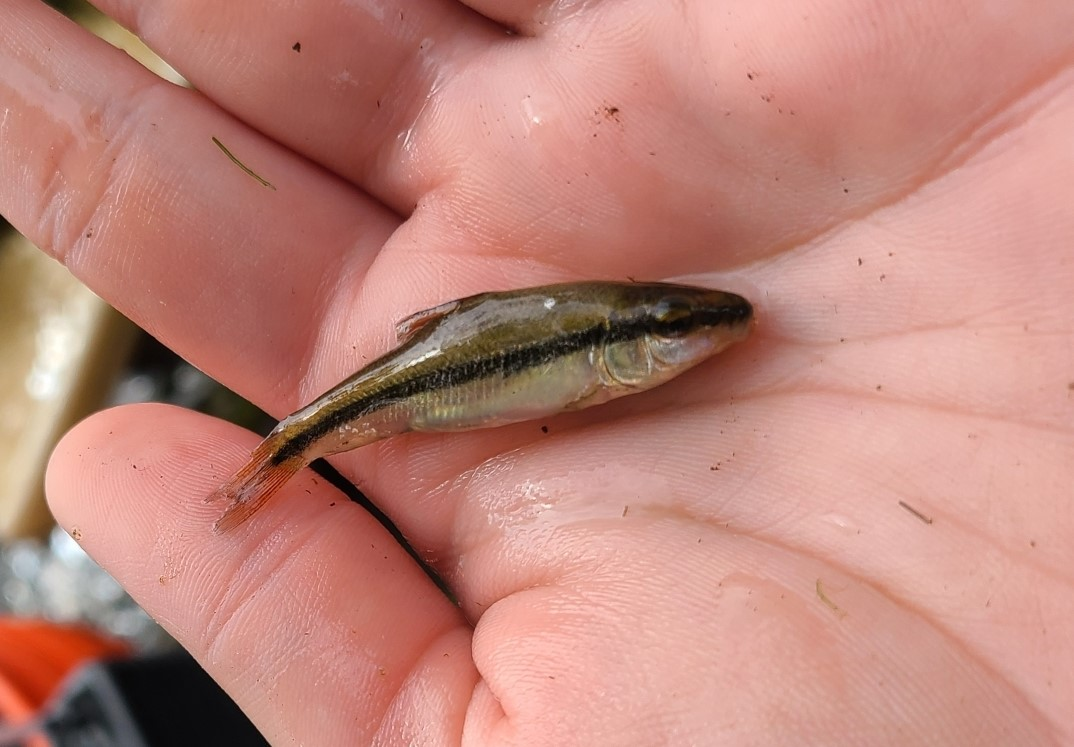
Eastern Creek Chubsucker, Erimyzon oblongus juvenile

The spawning season for the creek chubsucker runs from March to May, with the eastern subspecies spawning at a water temperature of 11 °C (52 °F), with most activity at night. The western subspecies spawns at water temperatures of 12–24 °C (54–75 °F), spawning in the afternoon. Habitat suitable for spawning is usually in small creeks with small cleared depressions on clear, gravel bottoms of pools just above riffles.

Prior to spawning, males and females migrate upstream where possible. Males defend territories in moderately swift water over beds of gravel or near pits constructed by various minnow species. Males do not initiate the digging of nest pits, but will modify existing pits by pushing stones around with their snouts. Females congregate upstream of males in quiet water, periodically drifting tail first into male territories. Once in a male's territory, the female digs in the gravel with her snout, apparently signaling to the male that she is ready to spawn. In contrast to most species of suckers, creek chubsuckers frequently engage in trio spawning involving two males on either side of one female.

Actual spawning lasts three to five seconds as the males press against the female. Both release gametes while quivering and stirring the substratum with their caudal and anal fins. The fertilized eggs are demersal and semi adhesive. Color varies from light to deep golden yellow, and yolk occupies most of egg with no oil drops in the yolk mass. Egg production has been extremely variable with anywhere between 8,500 and over 80,000 eggs being produced by a single female.

Regardless of high fecundity this species is not found in high numbers. Females may live for 6 or 7 years, though males only live for 5 years.

== Current management ==
Currently, the creek chubsucker is of least concern according to the International Union for Conservation of Nature. The presence of creek chubsuckers usually indicates the presence of other, more desirable game species. There is currently no management plan to control or monitor the fish. Because of its wide range, the creek chubsucker is native to many areas that fall inside the boundaries of protected national and state parks, and this will hopefully ensure its existence for future generations.

Several anthropogenic factors have been noted as leading to the decline of the creek chubsucker like areas where siltation pollution occurs. Siltation pollution is produced from a variety of sources including but not limited to construction, logging, and agricultural practices. Dams may also be of concern for the species however most areas inhabited by creek chubsuckers are small order streams and may not be suitable for dam construction.

== Management recommendations ==
The creek chubsucker is an important species in lotic water systems. It is a fish that turns over energy by consuming vegetation detritus. The creek chubsucker also regulates population levels of macro-invertebrates and algae, and it serves as an important prey fish for many desirable game fish species. It is important to survey and monitor the population of this species in order to get an estimation of the health of the immediate ecosystem. More measures like water and sediment sampling as well as mark and recapture techniques should be put into place to compile data on creek chubsucker population levels and health. Periodic, random electroshocking and seining would be ideal for conducting mark and recapture surveys in low order streams.

The eggs of the creek chubsuckers are a valuable source of energy for many creatures of the lotic stream system. Special emphasis should be placed on promoting high levels of breeding individuals to ensure breeding adult recruitment, therefore continuing a viable food source for other organisms. Buffer zones should be implemented around all streams in the vicinity of disturbances that could cause sediment pollution. Excessive siltation fills the gravel beds used for egg laying during spawning and deprives eggs of oxygen. Dams may also pose a problem by not allowing the fish to access areas used for breeding, but little information exists on their effects on the creek chubsucker.
