= Running Creek (Ontario) =

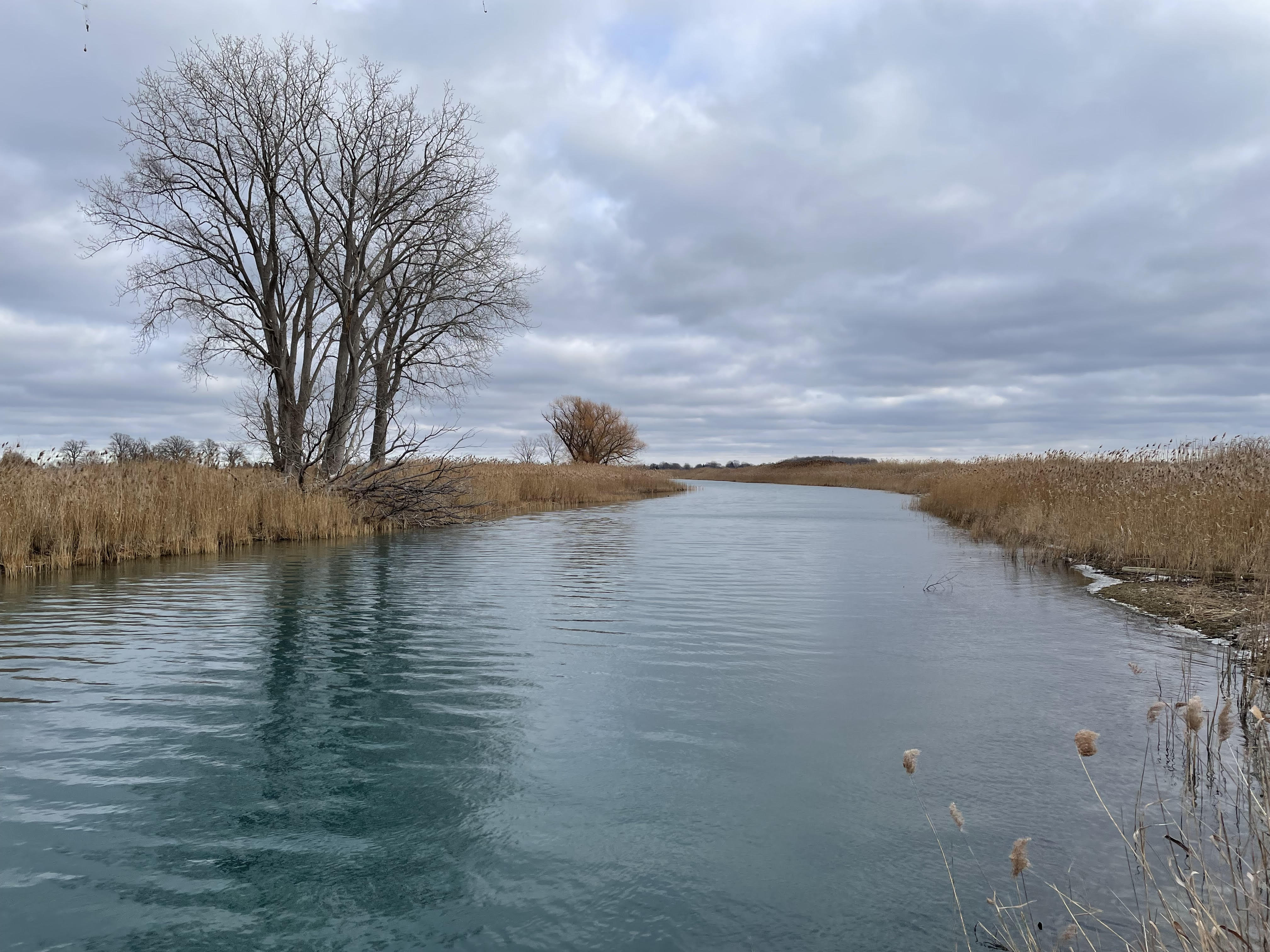
- Running Creek looking east from Arnold Road

- Location of the mouth of Running Creek in Southern Ontario

Location
- Country: Canada
- Province: Ontario
- Region: Southwestern Ontario
- Municipality: Chatham-Kent

Physical characteristics
- Source: Chenail Ecarté (The Snye)
  - coordinates: 42°36′11″N 82°28′41″W
  - elevation: 175 m (574 ft)
- Mouth: North Sydenham River
  - location: Wallaceburg
  - coordinates: 42°36′14″N 82°23′19″W
  - elevation: 175 m (574 ft)

Basin features
- River system: Great Lakes Basin

Running Creek is a stream in the municipality of Chatham-Kent in Southwestern Ontario, Canada. It is a left distributary of the Chenail Ecarté (The Snye), is a tributary of the North Sydenham River, and is part of the Great Lakes Basin.

The creek begins at the Chenail Ecarté (The Snye) at an elevation of 175 metres (574 ft), and flows east to its mouth at the North Sydenham River, at an elevation of 175 metres (574 ft), on the north side of the community of Wallaceburg. The North Sydenham River flows via the Sydenham River, Lake St. Clair and the Detroit River to Lake Erie.
