= Ontario Highway 78 =

Former Ontario provincial highway

Highway 78
- A map of Highway 78 (as of December 31, 1997); Highway 78 Bypassed segments

Route information
- Maintained by Ministry of Transportation of Ontario
- Length: 17.60 km (10.94 mi)
- Existed: May 13, 1938 – January 1, 1998

Major junctions
- West end: Highway 40 (McNaughton Avenue) in Wallaceburg
- East end: Highway 21 (St. George Street) in Dresden

Location
- Country: Canada
- Province: Ontario
- Counties: Chatham-Kent
- Towns: Wallaceburg, Dresden

Highway system
- Ontario provincial highways; Current; Former; 400-series
← Highway 77	→ Highway 85
Former provincial highways
Highway 79 →

King's Highway 78, commonly referred to as Highway 78, was a provincially maintained highway in the Canadian province of Ontario. The 17.60-kilometre (10.94 mi) route connected Highway 40 (McNaughton Avenue) in downtown Wallaceburg with Highway 21 (St. George Street) in Dresden.

Highway 78 was established in May 1938, and generally followed the same route throughout its existence; the majority of changes occurred within Wallaceburg. In 1962 the route was almost moved to follow Kent County Road 15 (Baseline Road), but local opposition cancelled the proposal. During the mid-to-late 1960s it was signed concurrently with Highway 21 between Dresden and Thamesville. Responsibility for maintenance of the entire route was transferred to the municipality of Chatham-Kent on January 1, 1998. Since then, it has been known as Chatham-Kent Road 78.

== Route description ==
Highway 78 was a 17.60 km (10.94 mi) route that connected Highway 40 in Wallaceburg with Highway 21 in Dresden. The highway began at the intersection of Dufferin Street, McNaughton Avenue and Wellington Street, immediately north of the Sydenham River. It travelled northeast alongside the river along a one-way pairing, with eastbound traffic following Dufferin Avenue and James Street, and westbound traffic following Wellington Street. The pairing bisected downtown Wallaceburg before reconvening prior to crossing the North Sydenham River on the Dundas Bridge.

Curving east, James Street became Margaret Avenue. Highway 78 continued to generally parallel the Sydenham River until exiting Wallaceburg at Highland Drive. It travelled northeast into farmland and diverged north from the river before curving east and becoming McCreary Line. The remainder of the route was entirely straight, with only a minor swerve at the boundary between Chatham Township and Camden Township. The highway ended immediately north of Dresden at Highway 21, east of which the roadway continued as Kent County Road 29.

== History ==
=== Early history ===
The roads that became part of Highway 78 predated it by almost a century. The majority of the route followed the McCreary Line, the third concession of the Chatham and Camden Township gore, while a portion near Wallaceburg followed the riverfront road. Originally, a ferry connected the opposite shores of the North Branch of the Sydenham River. In 1872, (Note: A local newspaper article from 1960 notes that older residents recall the bridge being purchased as late as 1884.) Wallaceburg purchased an old railway bridge from Ohio and built the North Branch Bridge. The roadway was paved c. 1920.

=== Designation ===
Highway 78 was first designated as a provincial route by the Department of Highways (DHO), predecessor to the modern Ministry of Transportation of Ontario (MTO), in 1938. The 10.25-mile (16.50 km) route, connecting Highway 40 with Highway 21, was assumed on April 13, 1938. While the highway was already paved when it was established, it featured narrow pavement. Highway 78 was extended 20.1 kilometres (12.5 mi) concurrently with Highway 21 between Dresden and Thamesville in 1963. This concurrency remained in place until 1969, after which Highway 78 once again ended north of Dresden.

Two projects were completed in the mid-1940s to straighten the route east of Wallaceburg. Originally, Highway 78 followed North River Line to Kimball Road, onto which it turned 90 degrees north before turning east onto Abraham Line. A similar pair of 90 degree turns existed at Mandaumin Road. A straighter route was built at both locations in 1945.

In 1962, a proposal was raised by the Wallaceburg Chamber of Commerce to have the DHO exchange Highway 78 with Kent County Road 15 (Base Line), which ran parallel to the highway but south of both Wallaceburg and Dresden. Base Line bypassed the downtown areas of both towns and already received a greater portion of large truck traffic than Highway 78. The concept was met with approval from Wallaceburg, Chatham Township, and Kent County officials, and surveying work was undertaken that summer. Wallaceburg later rescinded its support in September after the proposal was met with disapproval from local farmers, residents and businesses alike. While the DHO agreed to the swap, it set out the condition that it must be approved by a majority of local residents, effectively killing the proposal. Several months later, an agreement between all parties was reached whereby the DHO rebuilt Base Line to provincial highway standards but Kent County retained ownership of the road.

As part of a series of budget cuts initiated by premier Mike Harris under his Common Sense Revolution platform in 1995, numerous highways deemed to no longer be of significance to the provincial network were decommissioned and responsibility for the routes transferred to a lower level of government, a process referred to as downloading. As it generally served a regional function, Highway 78 was downloaded in its entirety on January 1, 1998, and transferred to the newly formed municipality of Chatham-Kent. Since then, it has been known as Chatham-Kent Road 78.

=== Wallaceburg ===
Within Wallaceburg, Highway 78 originally began at the intersection of James Street and Duncan / McDougal Streets, where Highway 40 turned from south to west. When the Lord Selkirk Bridge was opened by the Minister of Highways, George Doucett, on November 23, 1950, Highway 40 was redirected across the Sydenham River along McNaughton Avenue instead of McDougal Street via Murray Street and King Street. As a result, Highway 78 was extended by 0.43 kilometres (0.27 mi) along James Street and Dufferin Avenue to the McNaughton Avenue / Wellington Street intersection.

In January 1953, Wallaceburg mayor William Collins suggested converting James and Wellington Streets into a one-way pairing, following a similar experiment begun in Chatham in August 1951. This was approved at the next town council meeting on February 3. However, local businesses on James Street protested the proposal, and it was ultimately shelved in August. The concept resurfaced in April 1961, and this time was approved by the town council in a 5–3 vote on April 18. The conversion took place on July 27, in tandem with the opening of the Dundas Bridge.

The Dundas Bridge, named after former Wallaceburg mayor Thomas B. Dundas, was built to replace the North Branch Bridge, a two lane Pratt truss swing bridge built in 1872. The old steel structure, itself a previously used railroad bridge from Ohio, was outdated and in a state of disrepair when surveying work to replace it began in late January 1958. A temporary Bailey bridge was erected upstream, connecting Elizabeth Street with Park Street. This was done to avoid the lengthy detour via Becher or Tupperville. Construction began on October 20, 1959, and it was unofficially opened to traffic on March 18, 1960. Just seventeen days later, a girder failure caused the North Branch Bridge to collapse partially, and it was permanently closed. Demolition of the old structure took place throughout the remainder of April and May, with construction of the new bridge beginning on May 31. Kent County council voted to name the new bridge on January 20, 1961. Unlike other places and roads in Ontario, the bridge was not named after the controversial anti-abolitionist Henry Dundas. It was ceremoniously opened to traffic seven months later by Highway Minister Fred Cass on July 27, with the temporary Bailey bridge removed the following week.

The one-way system instituted in 1961 failed to alleviate traffic issues in downtown Wallaceburg, which led the town to commission a traffic study in the summer of 1964. The resulting study, released in August 1967, recommended a realignment and widening of Wellington Street to serve as a thoroughfare around the historic downtown area along James Street, as well as removing a pair of 90 degree turns at Fork Street. It took over a decade before the proposal was acted upon, and several more years before the provincial government approved and funded the project. Construction to replace Fork Street with an S-curve began August 4, 1980, and was completed by the end of the year. The realignment of Wellington Street north by 27 metres (89 ft), including widening it to four lanes, was completed in late 1987.

=== Downloading ===
As part of a series of budget cuts initiated by premier Mike Harris under his Common Sense Revolution platform in 1995, numerous highways deemed to no longer be of significance to the provincial network were decommissioned and responsibility for the routes transferred to a lower level of government, a process referred to as downloading. Highway 78 was downloaded in its entirety and transferred to Kent County on January 1, 1998.

== Major intersections ==
The following table lists the major junctions along Highway 78, as noted by the Ministry of Transportation of Ontario in the 1997 Provincial Highways Distance Table. The entire route was located in Kent County.

Location	km	mi	Destinations	Notes
Wallaceburg	0.00	0.00	Highway 40 (McNaughton Avenue / Dufferin Avenue)	Eastbound Highway 78 followed James Street, westbound Highway 78 followed Wellington Street; beginning of Wallaceburg Connecting Link
Wallaceburg	0.70	0.43	Fork Street / Wellington Street	One-way pairing ends
Wallaceburg	0.90	0.56	Murray Street	
Wallaceburg	2.20	1.37	Highland Crescent	End of Wallaceburg Connecting Link
Chatham Township	2.80	1.74	Municipal Road 31 north (Kimball Road)	
Chatham Township	3.60	2.24	Municipal Road 31 west (Abraham Line)	
Chatham Township	10.20	6.34	Municipal Road 28 south (Tupperville Road) – Tupperville	
Dresden	17.60	10.94	Highway 21 – Thamesville, Petrolia; Municipal Road 29 east (Croton Line)	
1.000 mi = 1.609 km; 1.000 km = 0.621 mi
