= Oldfield, Ontario =

Oldfield
- dispersed rural community
- Location within Municipality of Chatham-Kent Location within Southern Ontario
- Coordinates: 42°32′37″N 82°18′49″W
- Country: Canada
- Province: Ontario
- Region: Southwestern Ontario
- Municipality: Chatham-Kent
- Elevation: 177 m (581 ft)
- Time zone: UTC-5 (Eastern Time Zone)
  - Summer (DST): UTC-4 (Eastern Time Zone)
- Postal code: N0P 2M0
- Area codes: 519, 226, 548

Oldfield is a dispersed rural community in the municipality of Chatham-Kent in Southwestern Ontario, Canada. It is 8 kilometres (5.0 mi) southeast of Wallaceburg, and is on Chatham-Kent Road 42 (signed there as the Oldfield Line), 2.7 kilometres (1.7 mi) east of Ontario Highway 40. Maxwell Creek flows along the north side of the community.
