= Pointe aux Pins =

- Nearest city: Blenheim, Ontario
- Coordinates: 42°16′33.22″N 81°51′26.31″W

Pointe aux Pins is a peninsula running south into Lake Erie at about 82 degrees west longitude. The majority of land which comprises the peninsula is owned by the province of Ontario and is designated as Rondeau Provincial Park. A navigational warning light is located near the tip of the peninsula at about 42 degrees, 15 minutes and 23.3 seconds North latitude, 81 degrees, 51 minutes and 6.5 seconds West longitude. The peninsula is designated as the Pointe aux Pins in the Atlas of Canada.
