= Johnston Channel (Canada) =

- Location of the mouth of the Johnston Channel in Southern Ontario

Location
- Country: Canada
- Province: Ontario
- Region: Southwestern Ontario
- County: Lambton

Physical characteristics
- Source: Chenail Ecarté (The Snye)
  - coordinates: 42°34′54″N 82°26′46″W
  - elevation: 175 m (574 ft)
- Mouth: Lake St. Clair
  - coordinates: 42°29′51.1″N 82°29′47.3″W
  - elevation: 175 m (574 ft)

Basin features
- River system: Great Lakes Basin

The Johnston Channel is a river geographically in Lambton County and on the territory of the Walpole Island 46 reserve of the Walpole Island First Nation, in Southwestern Ontario, Canada. It is a right distributary of the Chenail Ecarté (The Snye), and like that river also flows to Lake St. Clair; thus, it is part of the Great Lakes Basin. The river also separates Walpole Island to the west (right bank) from St. Anne Island to the east (left bank), which both are part of the Walpole Island 46 reserve of the Walpole Island First Nation.

The creek begins at the right bank of the Chenail Ecarté (The Snye) at an elevation of 175 metres (574 ft), west of the community of Wallaceburg. It meanders south, then turns southwest, and reaches its mouth at Johnston Bay on Lake St. Clair, at an elevation of 175 metres (574 ft). Lake St. Clair flows via the Detroit River to Lake Erie.
