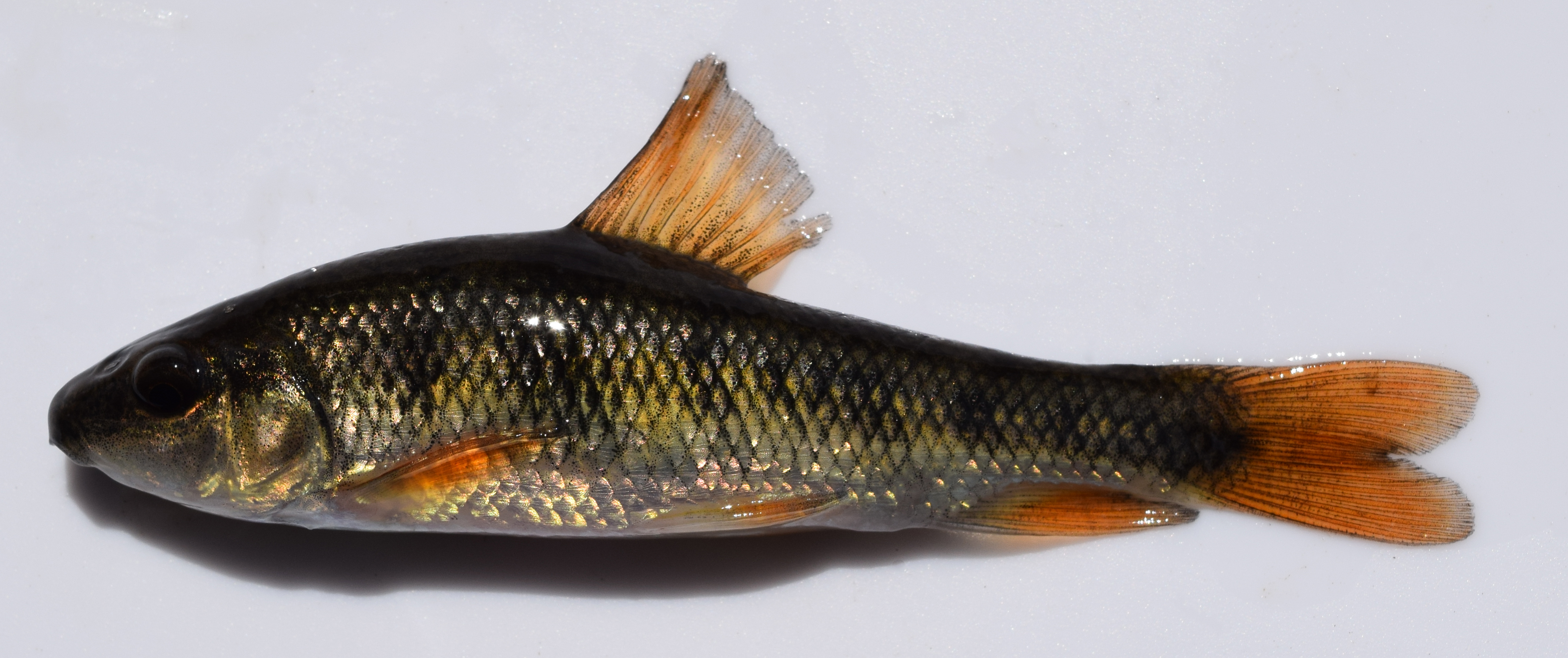
- Erimyzon claviformis

Scientific classification
- Domain: Eukaryota
- Kingdom: Animalia
- Phylum: Chordata
- Class: Actinopterygii
- Order: Cypriniformes
- Family: Catostomidae
- Subfamily: Catostominae
- Genus: Erimyzon; D. S. Jordan, 1876

Type species
- Cyprinus oblongus Mitchill, 1814

= Erimyzon =

Genus of fishes

Erimyzon is a genus of suckers native to North America. There are currently four recognized species in this genus.

== Species ==
- Erimyzon claviformis (Girard, 1856) (Western creek chubsucker)
- Erimyzon oblongus (Mitchill, 1814) (Eastern creek chubsucker)
- Erimyzon sucetta (Lacépède, 1803) (Lake chubsucker)
- Erimyzon tenuis (Agassiz, 1855) (Sharpfin chubsucker)

== Biology ==
Chubsuckers live in creeks, lakes, ponds, rivers, and streams. They are commonly found near thick vegetation.

== Diet ==
Chubsucker species mainly consume aquatic insect larva. They can be seen "sucking" on the substrate of their watershed searching for a meal.
