= Jeannette's Creek train wreck =

1854 train wreck in Canada

Coordinates: 42°18′48″N 82°26′12″W

Details
- Date: October 27, 1854; 5 am
- Location: Baptiste Creek, Canada West
- Country: Canada
- Operator: Great Western Railway
- Incident type: Rear-end collision

Statistics
- Trains: 2
- Deaths: 52
- Injured: 48

The Jeannette's Creek train wreck, also known as the Baptiste Creek train wreck, was a fatal railroad accident on October 27, 1854, at Baptiste Creek near present-day Jeannettes Creek in Chatham-Kent, Ontario. It was Canada's first major train wreck, leaving 52 people dead and indeed the worst rail disaster in North America at that time.

The train involved left Niagara Falls the previous afternoon; it comprised eight cars altogether: four first-class, two second-class and two baggage cars. As was commonplace during that early time of rail travel, it was subject to several delays; these were caused by dense fog, a derailed gravel train, a burst cylinder head and a slow freight train ahead of it. By the time it left London at 1 a.m. bound for Windsor it was at least four hours late.

At Baptiste Creek, a gravel train consisting of fifteen cars loaded with wet gravel was on a siding employed in repairing the trackbed. Its engineer had been told by the night watchman at Baptiste Creek station that it was safe to venture onto the mainline as the passenger train had already passed; at 5 a.m. as the train backed along the main railway line at between 10 and 12 mph (16–19 km/h) the passenger train emerged from the fog at 20 mph (32 km/h).

The collision was described as "absolutely dreadful", the second-class cars were described as being "smashed into bits and pieces" with "nearly every person of them killed or dreadfully injured". The people in the front of one of the first-class cars suffered a similar fate.

Witnesses described several of the bodies, which included eleven women and ten children, as being "crushed out of all human shape". Six hours later, many of the bodies still had to be recovered. The second-class cars carried many German emigrants on their way to the United States. The 48 (some sources 60) injured were taken to Chatham where their moans and cries could be "heard throughout the town", with blood literally dripping from the cars.

A grand jury found that Twitchell, conductor of the gravel train, and Kettlewell, engineer of the train, were criminally responsible for the death of 52 persons, and they were charged with manslaughter. According to the jury, the gravel train had entered onto the track in contravention of the rules of the Great Western, and in any case, should not have proceeded onto the track in the dense fog.

== See also ==
- List of rail accidents in Canada
- List of rail accidents (before 1880)
