= Kent Bridge, Ontario =

Kent Bridge
- Unincorporated community
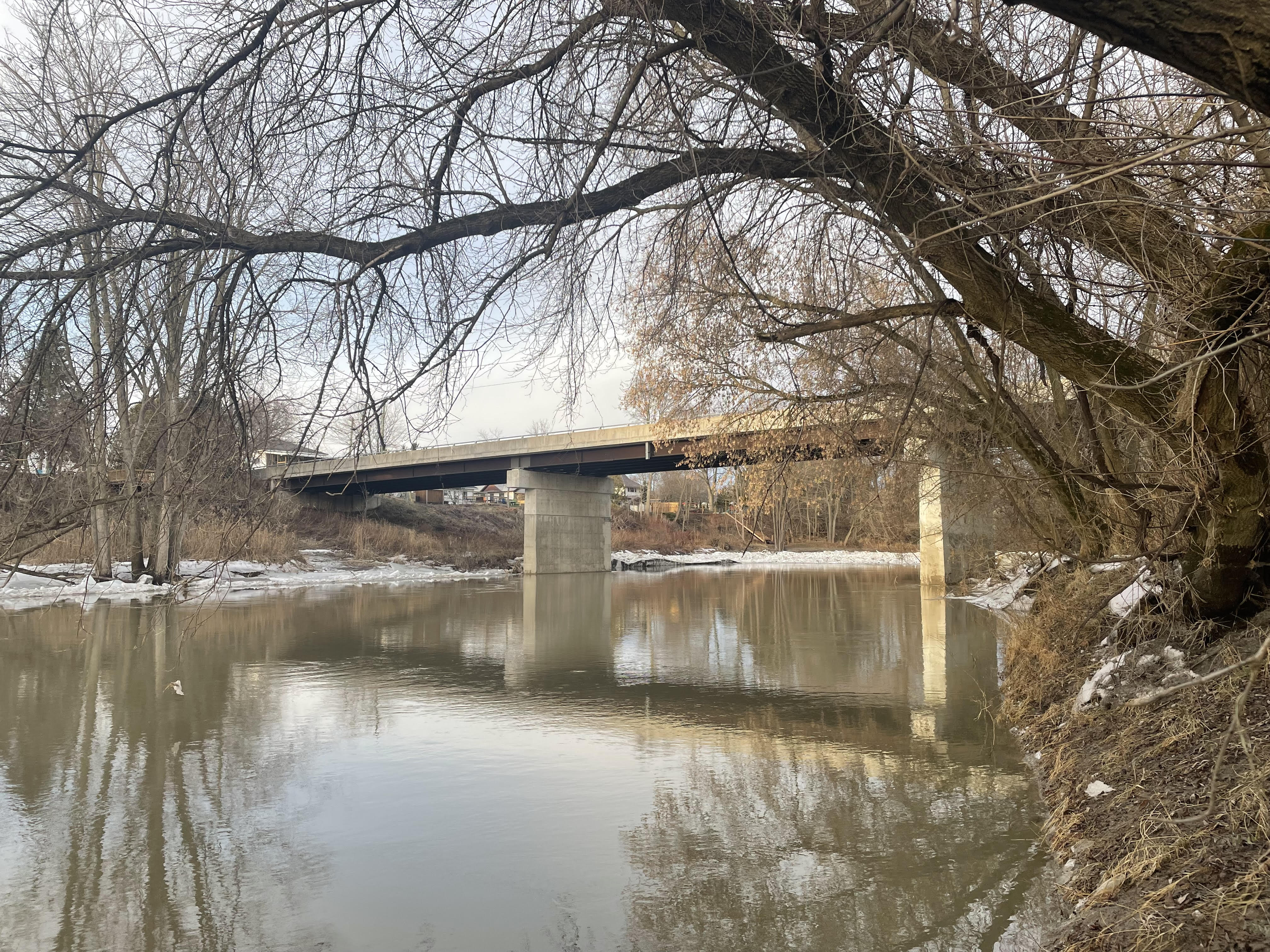
- The eponymous Kent Bridge seen from the banks of the Thames River

- Location of Kent Bridge in Chatham-Kent Kent Bridge (Southern Ontario)
- Coordinates: 42°30′52.7268″N 82°4′21.273″W
- Country: Canada
- Province: Ontario
- Municipality: Chatham-Kent
- Time zone: UTC-5 (EST)
  - Summer (DST): UTC-4 (EDT)
- Postal codes: 1V0
- Area code(s): 519, 226, 548

Kent Bridge is an unincorporated community in the municipality of Chatham-Kent, Ontario, Canada. It is located on the Thames River between Chatham and Thamesville and is centred around the intersection of Longwoods Road and Kent Bridge Road.

== History ==
Long predating the arrival of Europeans, the lands now encompassing the settlement of Kent Bridge are and have been the traditional territories of various Indigenous peoples, including the Potawatomi and Ojibwe. Attawandarons were also known to frequent this area, using it as a location for hunting and fishing.

By the early 1800s, settlers began to settle in and around the vicinity of Kent Bridge. Notably, one such settler, Frederick Arnold, established a mill upriver of modern Kent Bridge, which in 1813 would become the site where Shawnee leader Tecumseh last ate and slept before his death at the Battle of the Thames during the War of 1812.

Over the next few decades, a settlement began to form, with various churches, schools, and businesses establishing themselves near the intersection of Longwoods Roads and Town-line. In 1854, an enclosed wooden bridge would be built near the settlement over the Thames River and was called "Kent Bridge", which soon became the name of the growing hamlet. Prior to this, the area was known by several names, including Kelley’s Corners, Gee’s Ferry, Arnold’s Mill, and Howard Bridge, in reference to various local people and families. This original bridge would be replaced in 1861 by a double-arched wooden bridge and then again in 1875 by an iron one, supported by stone abutments. A second span would be added in 1901. At some point, this structure was replaced by the modern Kent Bridge.

In 1880, Kent Bridge had a school, general store, church, hotel, blacksmith shop, and a population of approximately 50.
