= Bothwell, Ontario =

Unincorporated community in Ontario, Canada

Bothwell
- Unincorporated community
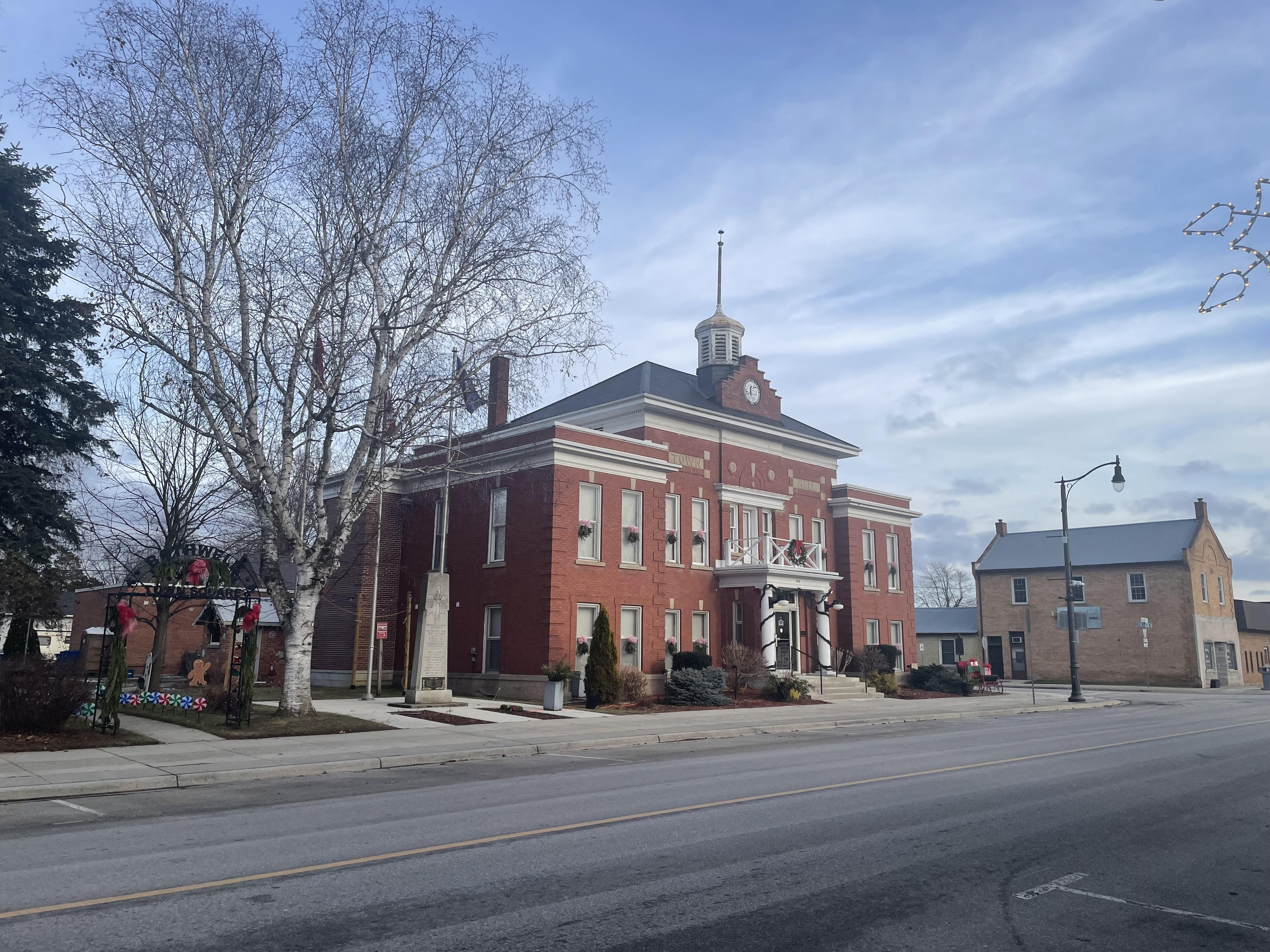
- The historic Bothwell Town Hall building seen in December 2025

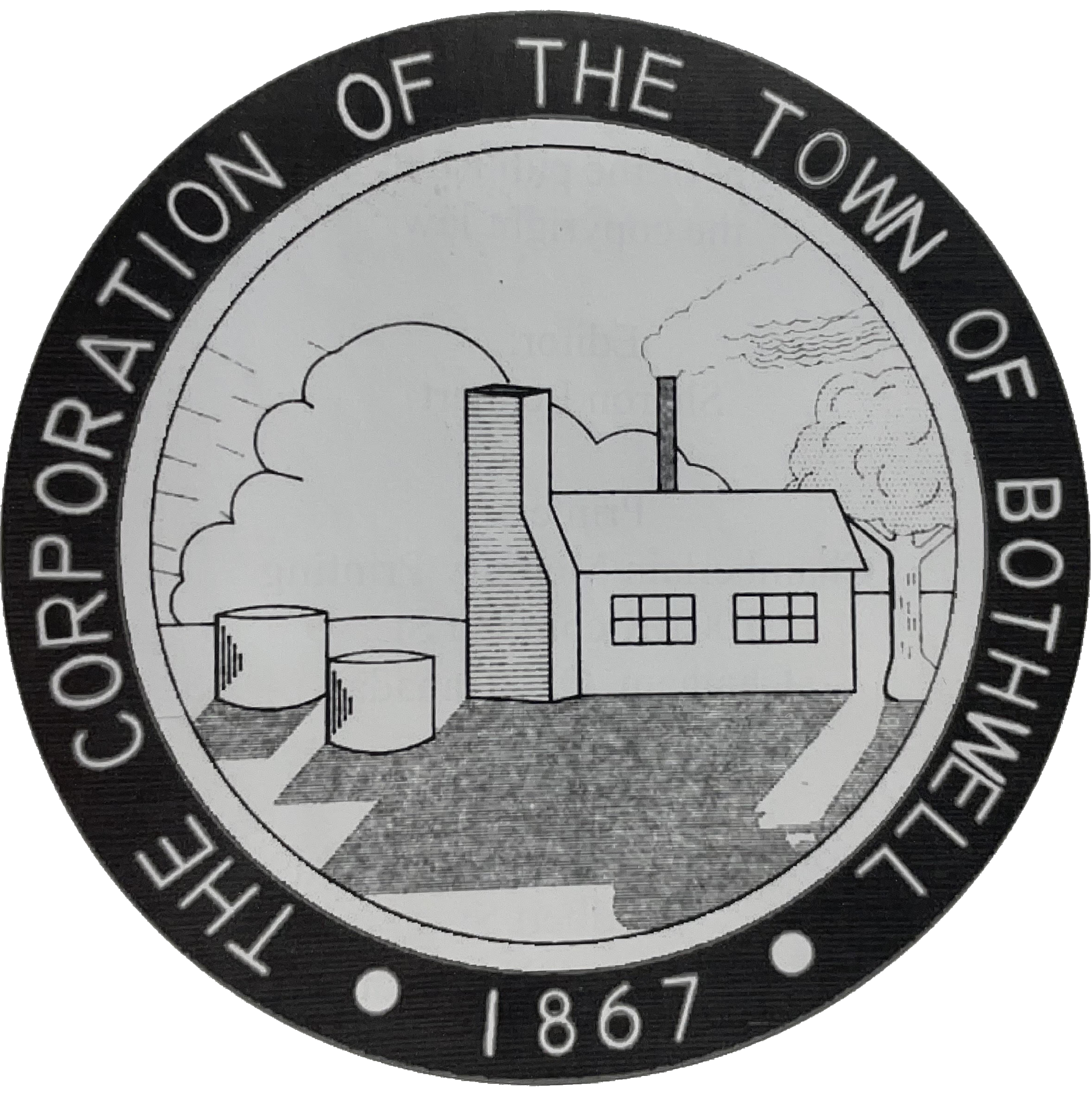
- Historic Seal

- Location of Bothwell in Chatham-Kent Bothwell (Southern Ontario)
- Coordinates: 42°37′53.6364″N 81°52′17.9592″W
- Country: Canada
- Province: Ontario
- Municipality: Chatham-Kent
- Founded: 1852
- Incorporated: 1867
- Founder: George Brown

Population (2021)
  - Total: 908
  - Density: 451.3/km^{2} (1,169/sq mi)
- Demonym: Bothwellian
- Time zone: UTC-5 (EST)
  - Summer (DST): UTC-4 (EDT)
- Postal codes: 1C0
- Area code(s): 519, 226, 548

Bothwell is an unincorporated community in Ontario, Canada located within the municipality of Chatham-Kent and in close proximity to the Thames River and the Delaware Nation at Moraviantown. It is recognized as a designated place by Statistics Canada.

Bothwell was part of the geographic Township of Zone before its incorporation by a special act of Parliament in 1867 following a local oil boom. It existed as an independent municipality within Kent County for approximately 130 years until its controversial amalgamation into Chatham-Kent in 1998. The local economy is predominantly agricultural.

== Etymology ==
Bothwell may have been named after the Earl of Bothwell, third husband of Mary, Queen of Scots, or simply after Bothwell, Scotland.

== History ==
Long predating the arrival of Europeans, the lands now encompassing Bothwell are and have been the traditional territories of various Indigenous peoples, including the Odawa, Potawatomi, and Ojibwe, and by the time of the written treaties, the Lunaapeew (Lenape).

=== Founding ===
Although some settlers arrived between 1837 and 1842, the land remained largely undeveloped until the arrival of the Great Western Railway in the 1850s. The route through the future township was surveyed in 1852, and the railway was completed in 1854.

Prior to the railway's completion, George Brown, founder of the Toronto Globe and future Father of Confederation, had conceived the idea of establishing a town in the area, identifying a business opportunity to sell locally sourced hardwood as lumber and fuel to the railroad and afterwards cultivating the cleared land for farming. To this end, Brown purchased 4000 acres of land north of the Delaware Nation at Moraviantown in 1852 and had the area north of the planned railroad surveyed and plotted. Under Brown's direction, a town plan was created, drafted by J.N. Charnoch of Hamilton.

Settlers gradually arrived in the burgeoning settlement, and by the establishment of Zone Township in 1857, a number of local businesses had established themselves. For his part, Brown had cultivated a farm of several hundred acres, erected sawmills, and established a furniture factory. Although the community was growing, actual money was scarce to come by, and early settlers initially relied on barter. Soon, IOUs to and from Brown, who had established himself as the employer of a majority of the workmen in and around the settlement, became the circulating medium of exchange, accepted by merchants in exchange for goods or in payment of debts, a condition which persisted for many years. Following a short-lived real estate boom brought on by the initial growth of the settlement and auctioning of its lots, the community settled into an economic slump by the early 1860s.

=== Oil Boom ===
Contemporaneous to discoveries in nearby Oil Springs, and later, Petrolia, oil was found near the Thames River in 1863 by American John Lick. News of the discovery triggered an oil boom, fuelling the rapid growth and expansion of the town as speculators from across the United States and Canada arrived to take part in the drilling or to cater to the influx of new population. New wells, as well as an oil exchange, banks, billiard halls, hotels, and stores (among other businesses) sprang up rapidly as wealth and people poured into the community. Soon, Bothwell's population exceeded 7000 people, surpassing that of Chatham and making Bothwell the largest community in Kent County. By 1864, despite significantly increased production, oil was selling at $10-$12 a barrel compared to just $1 per barrel for Lick's first shipment. By the time of its demise due to an engineering accident, Lick's first productive venture had shipped more than 30,000 barrels of oil.

The boom would be incredibly short-lived. Most of the speculators were American, as was much of the demand for oil. This demand was in large part due to the American Civil War. Consequently, when the war ended in 1865, the price of local oil dropped precipitously from its $12 a barrel peak to $2 a barrel, leading to the collapse of the industry. The situation was further exacerbated in 1866 by the Fenian Raids, which caused an exodus of Americans from the town as they fled the anticipated hostilities. Oil wells and pumps were left abandoned as they stood, lands nearly entirely paid for were returned to their original owners to save on the remaining costs, and the great hotels and business houses built only years or months earlier were left empty. Following the town's official incorporation in 1867, Bothwell's decline was cemented by a disastrous fire, which claimed much of the town centre. This and subsequent fires would see the destruction of most of the landmark buildings constructed during the oil boom. In the decades that followed the collapse of the boom, Bothwell gradually recovered and its population would stabilize, though it never returned to the levels reached during the boom.

=== Post-Boom ===
The Bothwell Town Hall building was constructed in 1915 and was the town's second town hall. An Edwardian-style structure designed by architect William Murray, Town Hall served both as a centre of local government and as a core social space in the community. It featured council chambers, a jail, a fire hall, a library, and a theatre. While no longer the seat of local council, the building continues to function in both municipal and community capacities.

Bothwell Arena was opened in 1972. The planning and financing of the sports complex was largely the result of local organizing and a successful community fundraising campaign, which occurred despite some initial government doubt as to the viability of the project.

In 1998, along with Zone Township and the other independent municipalities of Kent County, Bothwell was amalgamated into the single-tier Municipality of Chatham-Kent under the tenure of Mike Harris's Progressive Conservative provincial government. In January 2025, a fire destroyed a significant portion of the town's main commercial strip, resulting in approximately $3 million worth of damage.

== Demographics ==
In the 2021 Census of Population conducted by Statistics Canada, Bothwell had a population of 908 living in 403 of its 422 total private dwellings, a change of 6.1% from its 2016 population of 856. With a land area of 2.01 km^{2} (0.78 sq mi), it had a population density of 451.7/km^{2} (1,170.0/sq mi) in 2021.

=== Ethnicity ===
The most common ethnic or cultural origins reported in Bothwell in 2021 were Scottish (30.5%), English (29.9%), Irish (23.7%), German (16.4%), Canadian (15.8%), French (10.2%), Dutch (9.6%), First Nations (6.8%), Belgian (3.4%), and Welsh (2.8%).

=== Religion ===
In 2021, 65.5% of the population identified as Christian, with Catholics (12.4%) making up the largest denomination, followed by the United Church (11.3%), Anglicans (10.2%), Baptists (8.5%), and other denominations. 34.5% of the population reported no religious affiliation.

=== Language ===
English was the mother tongue of 93.9% of the population in 2021. This was followed by Spanish (1.1%), Plautdietsch (1.1%), German (0.6%), Dutch (0.6%), French (0.6%), and Maltese (0.6%). Of the official languages, 100% of the population reported knowing English and 1.1% French.

== Notable people ==
- George Brown, Scottish Canadian journalist, politician, Father of Confederation, and founder of Bothwell
- Brian Wiseman, former professional NHL ice hockey player and current NHL assistant coach whose career began with Bothwell Minor Hockey from 1975-1979

== See also ==
- George Brown
- Kent County
- Municipality of Chatham-Kent
- Oil Boom
- Oil Springs, Ontario
- Petrolia, Ontario
- List of communities in Ontario
- List of designated places in Ontario
