= Chenail Ecarté (The Snye) =

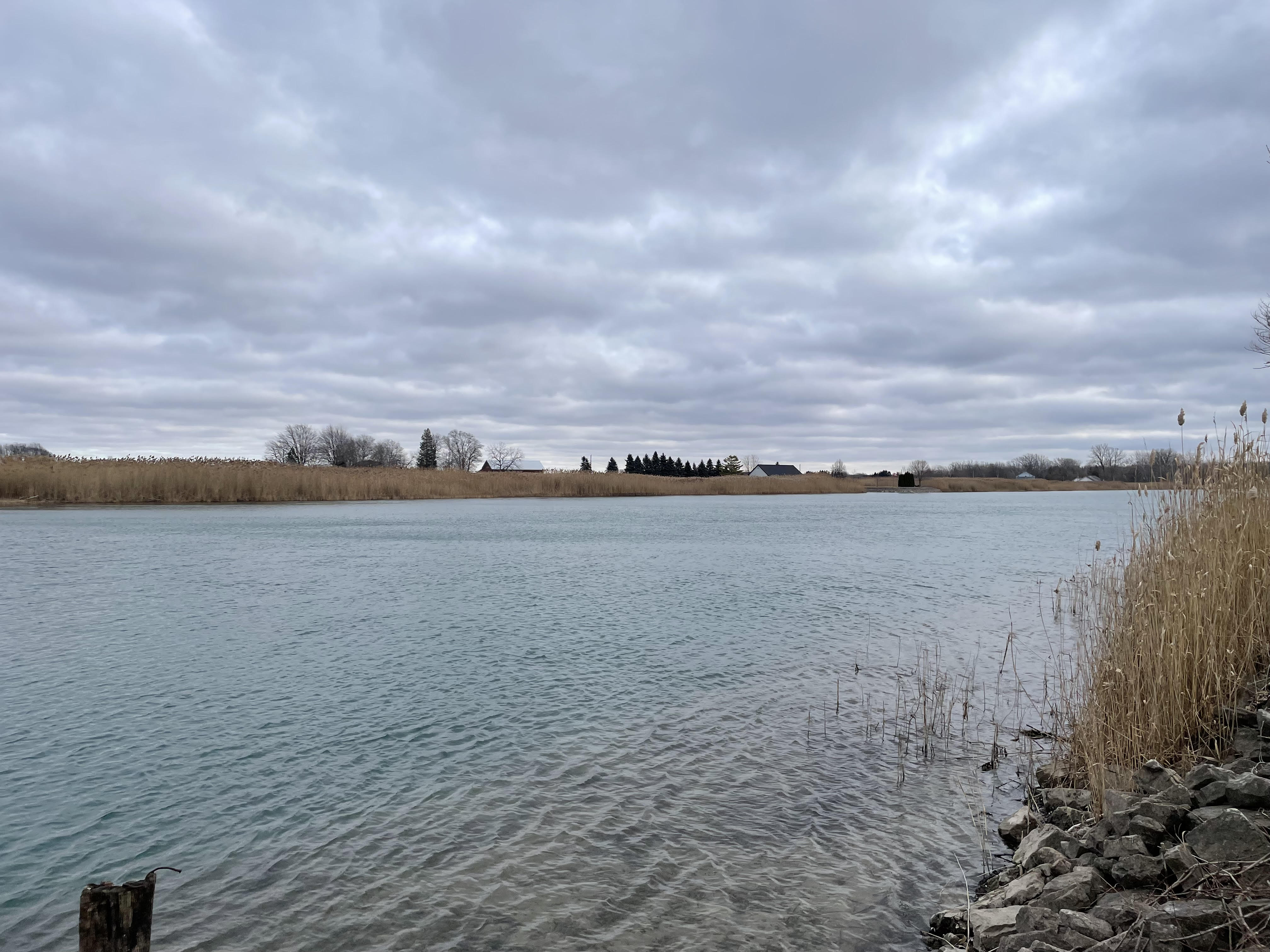
- Chenail Ecarté (The Snye) just south of Walpole Island Bridge

- Location of the mouth of the Chenail Ecarté (The Snye) in Southern Ontario

Location
- Country: Canada
- Province: Ontario
- Region: Southwestern Ontario
- Municipalities: Chatham-Kent; Saint Clair

Physical characteristics
- Source: St. Clair River
  - location: Saint Clair
  - coordinates: 42°38′17″N 82°30′15″W
  - elevation: 175 m (574 ft)
- Mouth: Lake St. Clair
  - location: Chatham-Kent
  - coordinates: 42°29′06.5″N 82°26′48.7″W
  - elevation: 175 m (574 ft)

Basin features
- River system: Great Lakes Basin
- Tributaries
  - left: Sydenham River

The Chenail Ecarté (The Snye) is a river in the municipalities of Saint Clair (Lambton County) and Chatham-Kent (formerly in Kent County) in Southwestern Ontario, Canada. It is a left distributary of the St. Clair River that flows to Lake St. Clair, and thus is part of the Great Lakes Basin. The river also separates mainland Ontario from the northeast edge of Walpole Island, and the entire eastern edge of St. Anne Island, which both are part of the Walpole Island 46 reserve of the Walpole Island First Nation.

The creek begins at the St. Clair River in the municipality of Saint Clair at an elevation of 175 metres (574 ft), south of the community of Port Lambton. It flows southeast into Chatham-Kent, then turns south. The distributary Johnston Channel exits from the right bank towards Lake St. Clair. The river then turns south, sees the exit of the distributary Running Creek, then takes in the Sydenham River, turns southwest, and reaches its mouth at Lake St. Clair, at an elevation of 175 metres (574 ft). Lake St. Clair flows via the Detroit River to Lake Erie.

== Tributaries ==
(in downstream order; all are left tributaries)

- Marshy Creek
- Grape Run
- Sydenham River
- Maxwell Creek
- Little Bear Creek

== Distributaries ==
- Johnston Channel (right)
- Running Creek (left)
