= Prairie Siding, Ontario =

Prairie Siding
- Unincorporated community
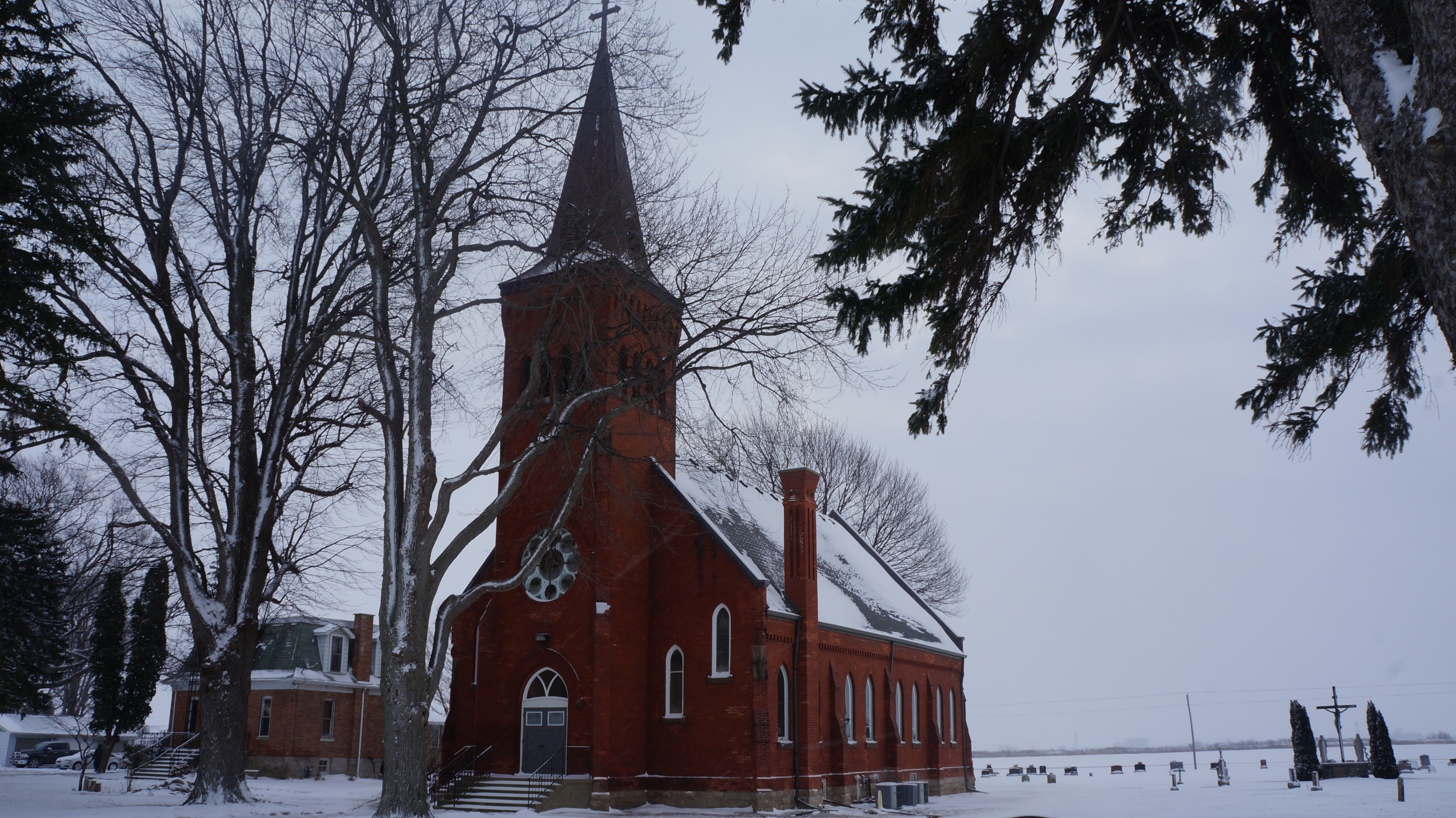
- St. Peter's Church on the Thames River
- Interactive map of Prairie Siding
- Coordinates: 42°20′48″N 82°19′27″W
- Country: Canada
- Province: Ontario
- Municipality: Chatham-Kent
- Time zone: UTC-5 (EST)
  - Summer (DST): UTC-4 (EDT)
- Forward sortation area: N0P 2L0
- Area codes: 519 and 226
- NTS Map: 040J08
- GNBC Code: FEMQN

Prairie Siding is a small farming community located in Southwestern Ontario. It lies north of the shores of Lake Erie. It supports one of the bridges across the Thames River for Southwestern Ontario.
