= Jeannettes Creek, Ontario =

Jeannettes Creek
- Unincorporated community
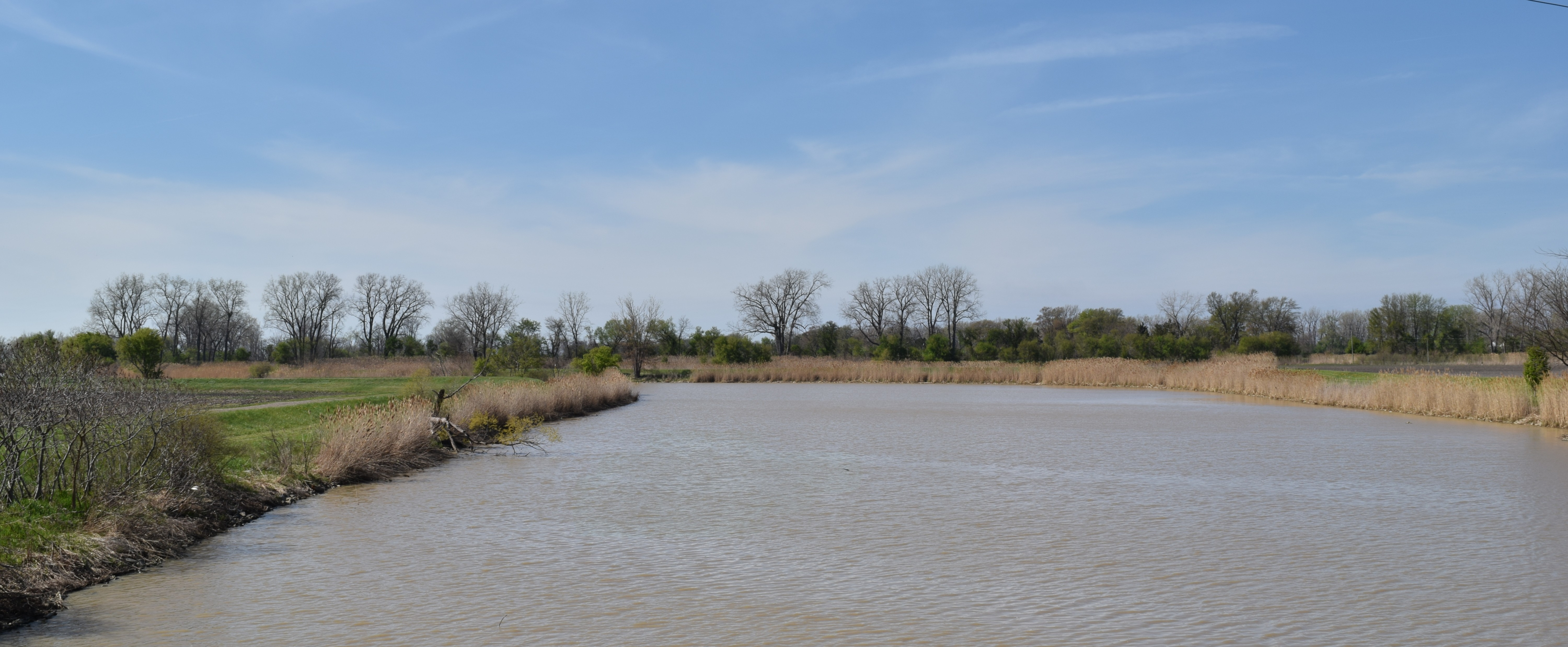
- The eponymous Jeannettes Creek

- Location Jeannettes Creek in Chatham-Kent Jeannettes Creek (Southern Ontario)
- Coordinates: 42°18′54.7812″N 82°25′16.7988″W
- Country: Canada
- Province: Ontario
- Municipality: Chatham-Kent
- Time zone: UTC-5 (EST)
  - Summer (DST): UTC-4 (EDT)
- Postal codes: N0P
- Area code(s): 519, 226, 548, 382

Jeannette's Creek is a community in Chatham-Kent, Ontario, Canada. As late as 1881, it was called Baptiste's Creek. It is located along the River Road in Tilbury East township.

A train wreck near Jeannette's Creek in 1854 killed 52 people, and continues to rank as one of the worst disasters in Canadian history.
