= Rondeau Provincial Park =

Provincial park in Ontario

- IUCN category II (national park)
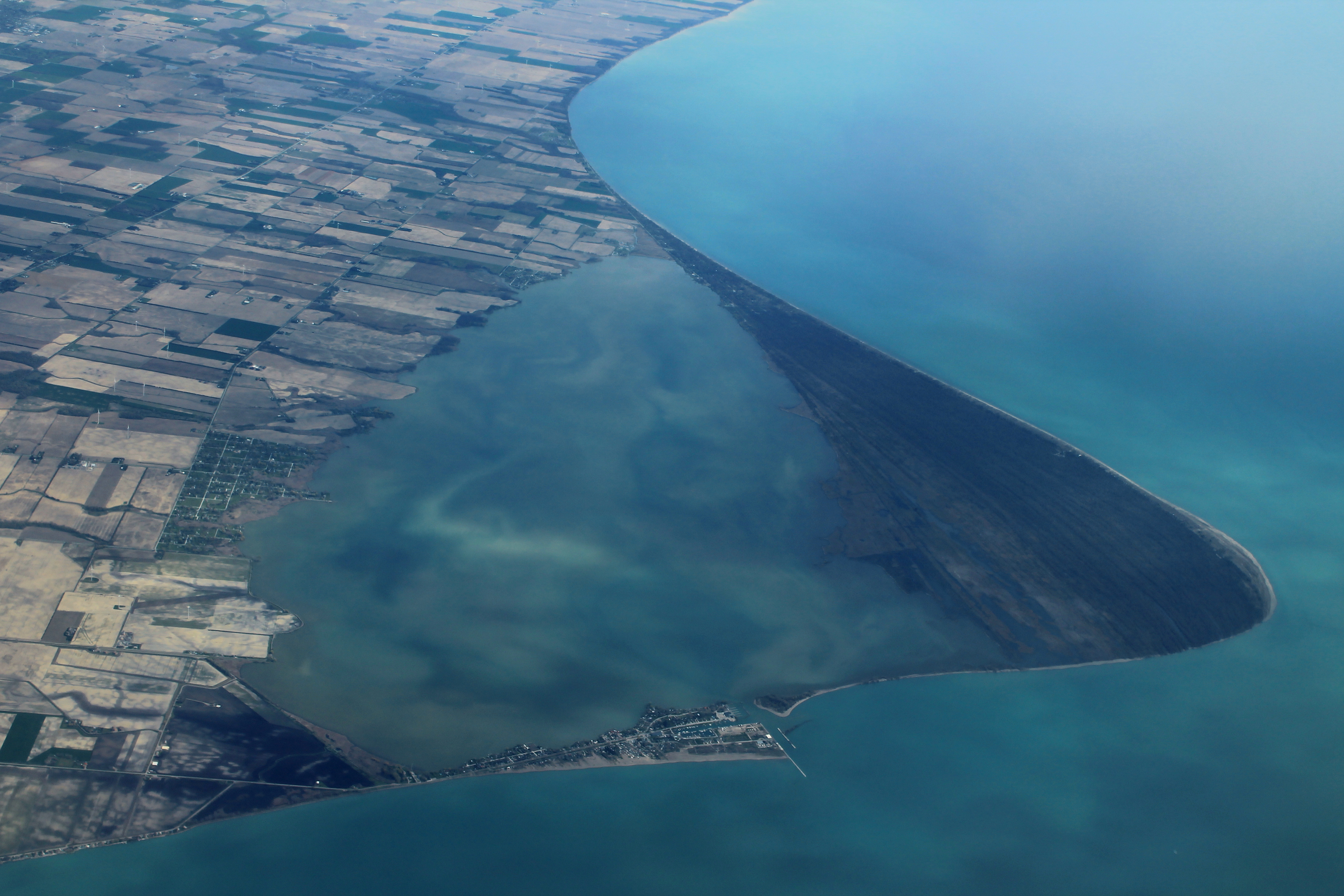
- Aerial view of the park

- Location within Southern Ontario
- Interactive map of Rondeau Provincial Park
- Location: Chatham-Kent, Ontario, Canada
- Nearest city: Chatham, Ontario
- Coordinates: 42°17′N 81°52′W
- Area: 32.54 km^{2} (12.56 sq mi)
- Established: 1894
- Visitors: 210,839 (in 2022)
- Governing body: Ontario Parks
- Website: https://www.ontarioparks.ca/park/rondeau

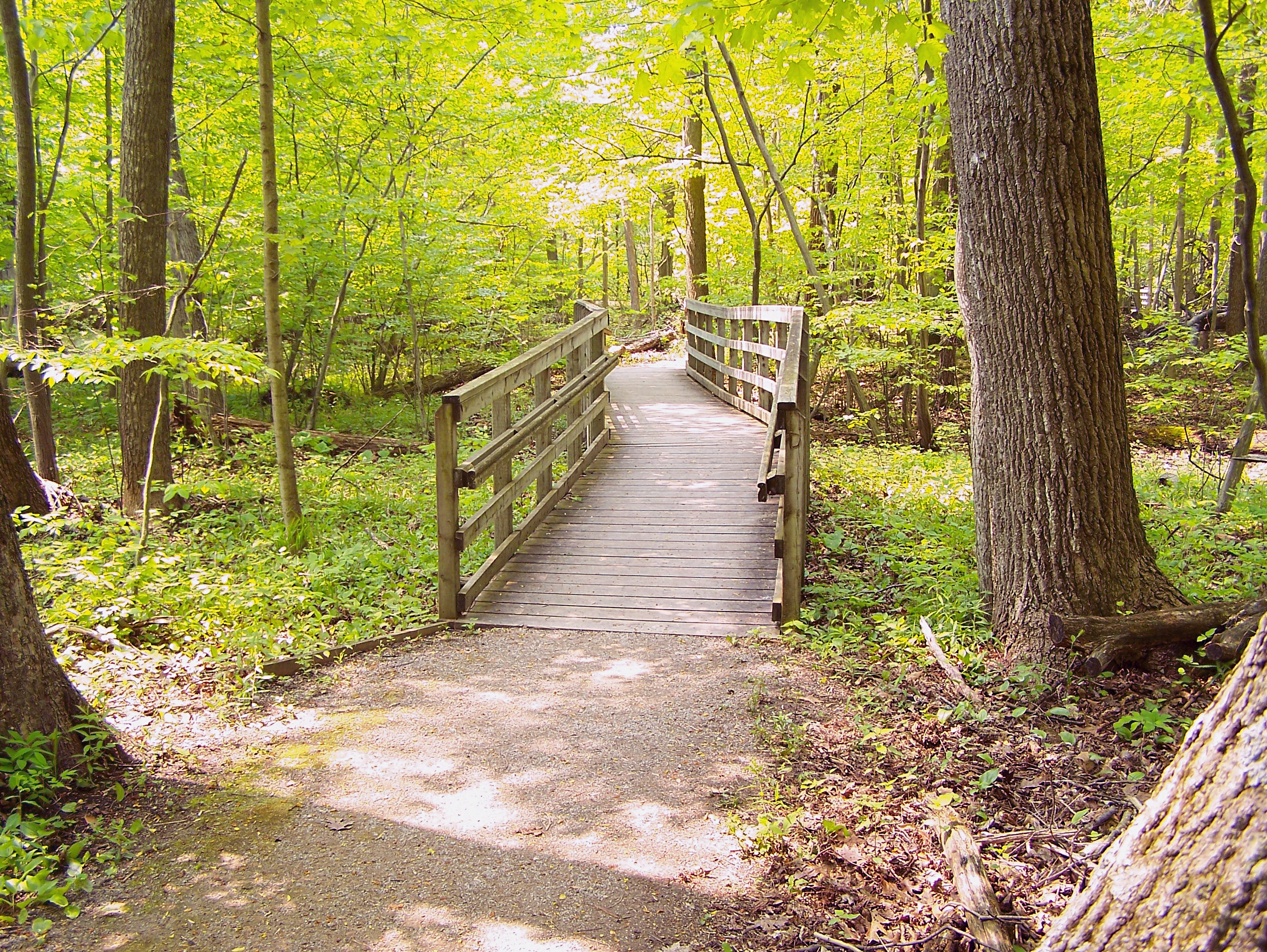
Rondeau in spring

Rondeau Provincial Park is the second oldest provincial park in Ontario, Canada, having been established with an order in council on 8 September 1894. The park is located in Southwestern Ontario, on an 8 km long crescentic sand spit extending into Lake Erie. Rondeau is home to the largest area of Carolinian forest in Canada, a long sand beach, a large marsh, approximately half of Rondeau Bay, campgrounds and a cottage community. The name of the park comes from the French words "ronde eau" or "round water" which describes the shape of the harbour sheltered by the peninsula.

The park is an important stopover for birds during migration and has been identified as a Canadian Important Bird Area. Its Carolinian woods also provide nesting habitat for the prothonotary warbler and many other rare or endangered species. The park is a popular recreation area. The presence of private cottages in the park has been controversial, as have been efforts to control white-tailed deer populations.

== Geography ==
The park is located on Pointe aux Pins, a peninsula extending into Lake Erie. The sandspit has formed in the last 12,000 years as currents in the lake deposit sandbars. The shape of the peninsula continues to evolve. For instance, the barrier beach has receded 650 metres (2,130 ft) in the past 150 years. In a 1930 soil survey most of the spit was mapped as Berrien sand, which is imperfectly drained.

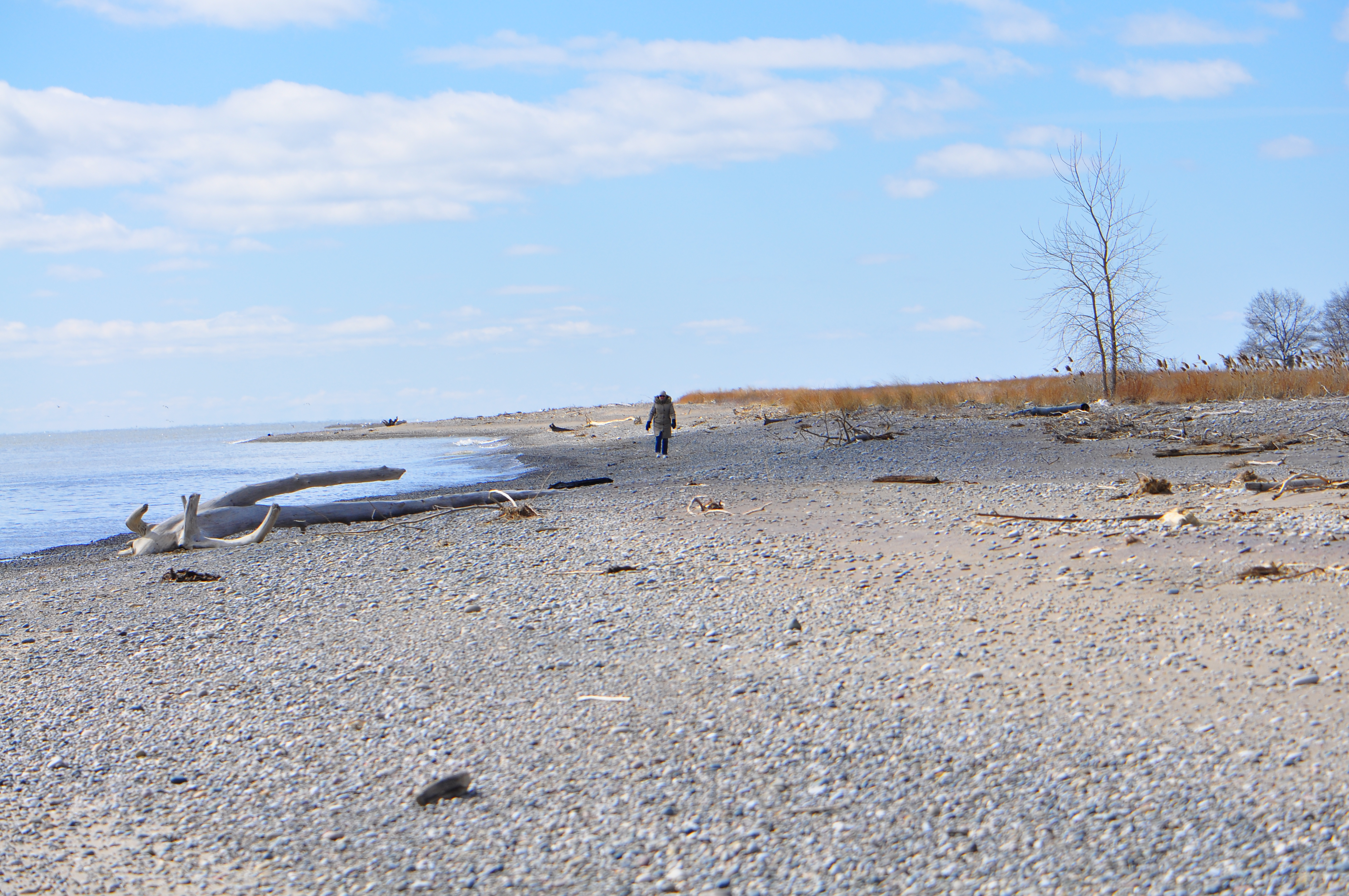
The Rondeau beach towards the southern end of the park

Rondeau Provincial Park includes most of the peninsula (excepting the very base), and much of Rondeau Bay. The peninsula is occupied by a series of low ridges and sloughs. A narrow sand spit extends west, sheltering the marshes and bay, and nearly reaching the town of Erieau.

== History ==
Prior to European Settlement, the area was used by the Neutral Nation. The peninsula was largely bypassed by settlers given the infertile, sandy soil. However, the forests of Point aux Pins were valuable, and heavy logging was underway as early as 1844. Through the 1870s and 1880s, the area became increasingly popular for recreation, and although only very limited use of the peninsula was permitted, pressures from fishing, grazing, forestry and other uses became increasingly important. Shortly following the establishment of Ontario's first Provincial Park in 1893 (Algonquin), pressure from local councils led to the establishment of Rondeau Provincial Park in 1894.

The initial regulations governing Rondeau prohibited settlement, grazing, and most logging, and allowed for camping under permit and a renewable lease policy for cottages. In a general sense, all these regulations remain in place today.

Rondeau is one of only two Ontario provincial parks with private cottage leases on publicly owned land. Several other parks, such as Presqu'ile Provincial Park, do have cottages on private land surrounded by the publicly owned park. At Rondeau, the cottage leases were first created between 1894 and 1950. As of 2022 there are 278 private cottages within Rondeau Provincial Park.

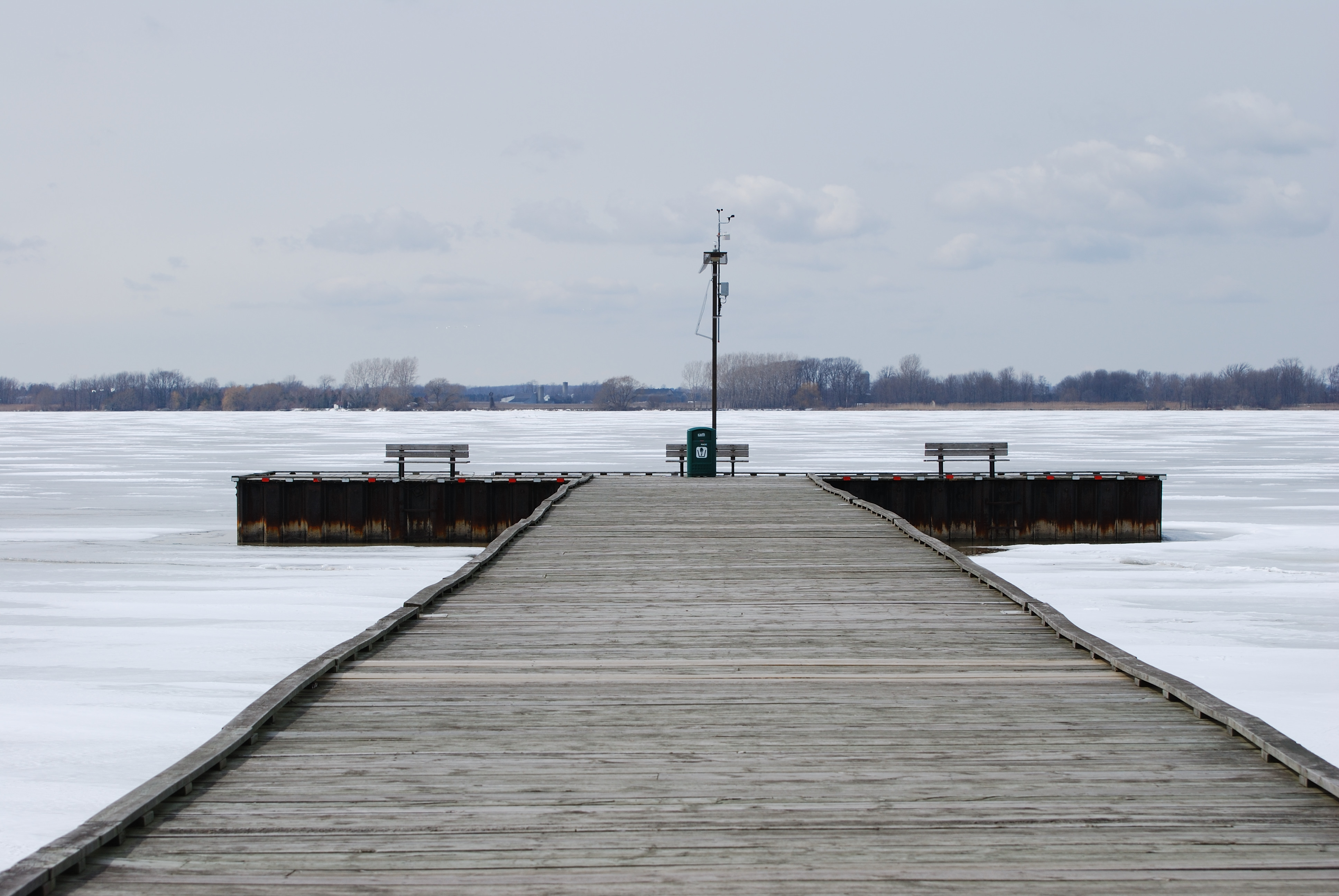
The former government pier in 2008

The future of cottages at Rondeau has been controversial. In 1986, the Provincial Parks Council recommended the extension of all cottage leases to 2017 after which they would be terminated, and in 2017, the leases were extended for a further two years to December 31, 2019. Since 1954, the Rondeau Cottagers Association has been lobbying for recognition and preservation of the Rondeau cottage community. In 2014, Chatham-Kent Council voted to have Rondeau's cottage community placed on the municipality's Heritage Register and be designated as a heritage district; the designation was later repealed by an order from the Ontario Municipal Board but the community remains on the Heritage Register.

A formerly popular site in the park was the government pier on Rondeau Bay. In 2014, the pier was severely damaged by thick ice on Rondeau Bay and later removed. Despite community pressure, the pier has not been replaced.

The Rondeau Yacht Club, located within the park, was founded in 1932. The club continues to operate during July and August teaching sailing, windsurfing, canoeing, and swimming to area children.

== Natural environment ==
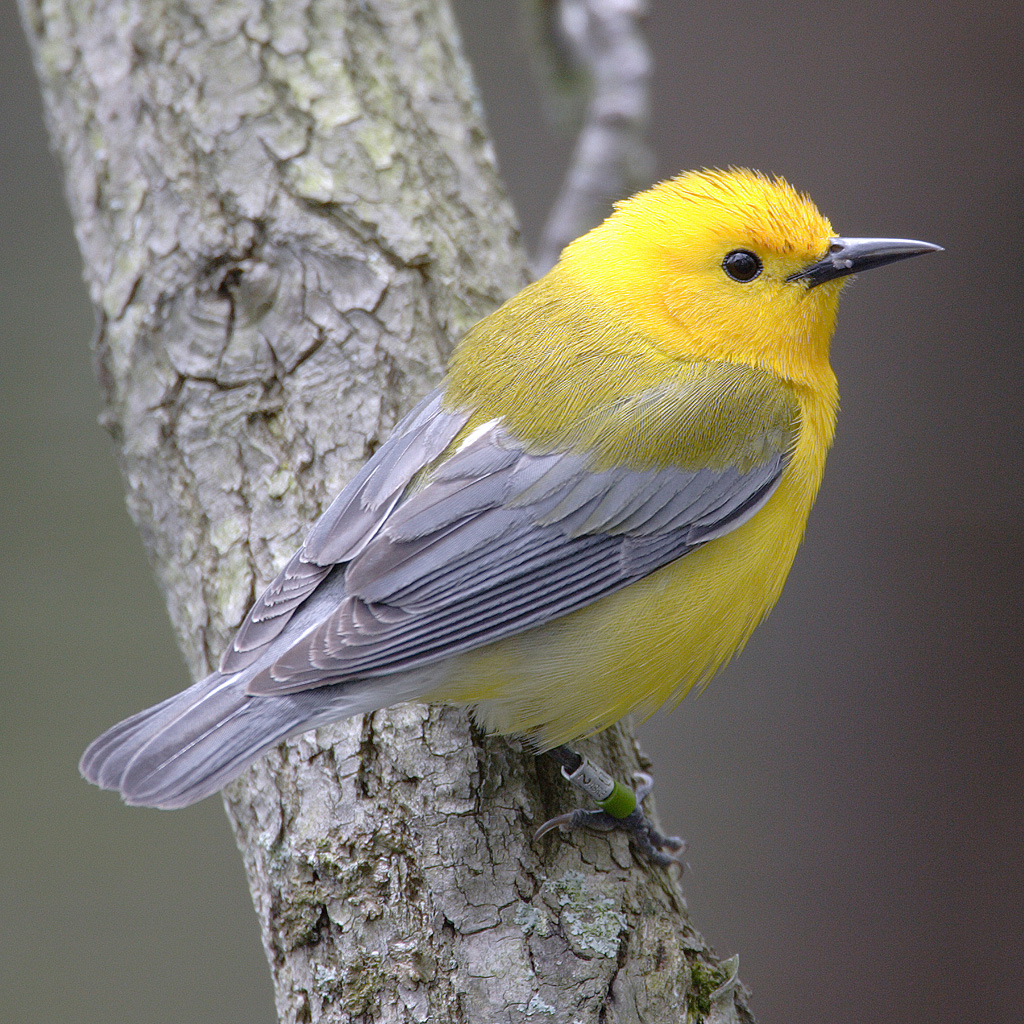
Prothonotary warbler, a specialty nesting bird of the park

Rondeau has a variety of habitats, including sandy beach, dunes, prairie, oak savannah, Carolinian forest, woodlands sloughs, a large marsh, and productive shallow bay. The park is recognised as one of Ontario's most important natural areas. Many of the plant species found here are typical of areas further south. Prominent among them is tuliptree, whose leaf forms the basis for the Friends of Rondeau Provincial Park logo. A variety of nationally and provincially threatened or endangered species are found in the park, such as eastern spiny softshell and nodding pogonia. The park is home to the largest population of breeding prothonotary warblers in Canada. Other endangered birds nesting in the park include king rail and Acadian flycatcher. The park is also an important stopover for migrating birds in spring and fall. During the first Atlas of Breeding Birds of Ontario, the Rondeau Area had the highest breeding bird diversity in the province.

Overpopulation of white-tailed deer, and their effect on forest vegetation, has been an ongoing concern. Although controversial, culls to control deer numbers are held on a regular basis, in recent years involving members of the Delaware Nation at Moraviantown.

== Recreation ==
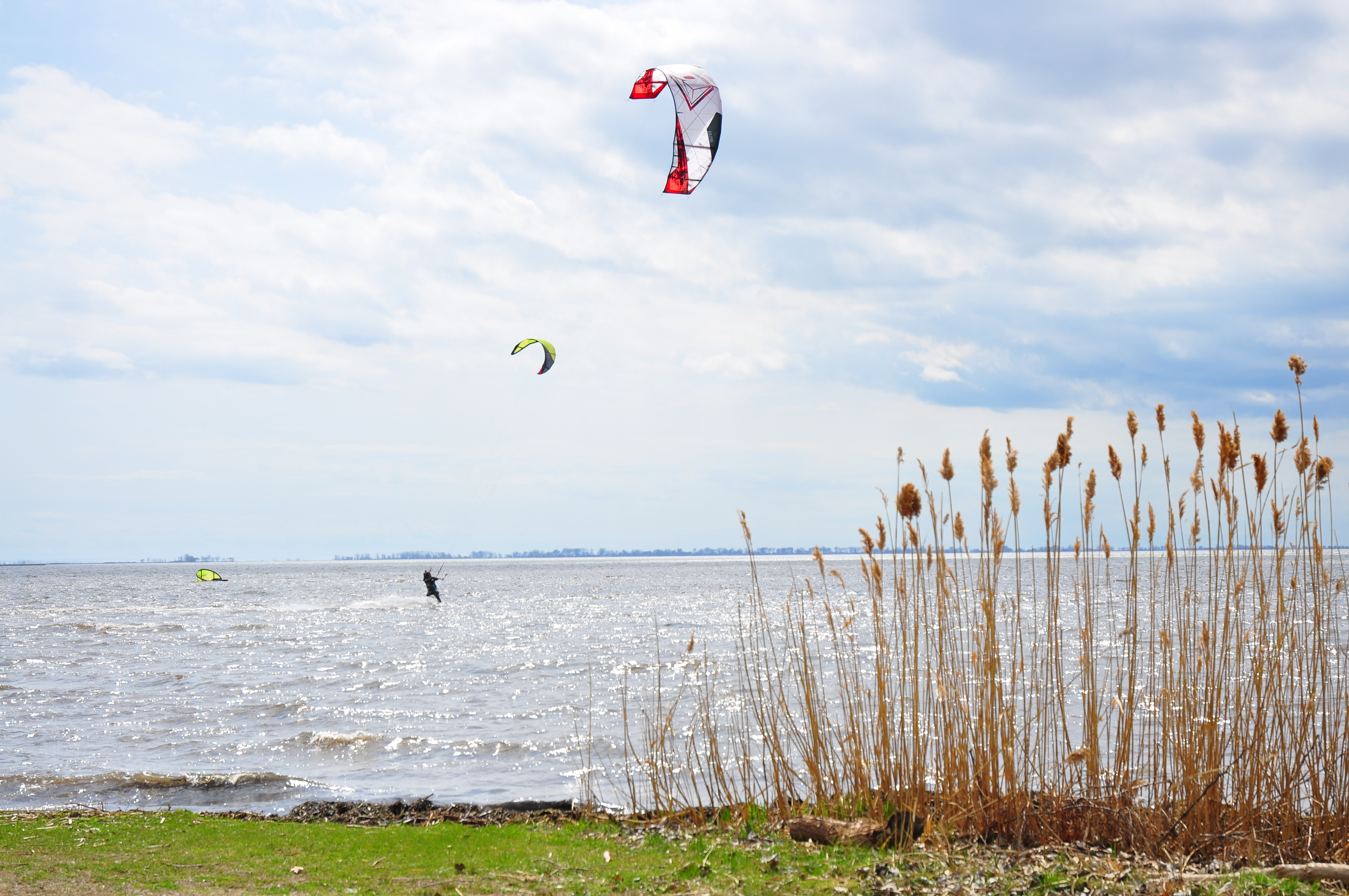
Windsurfing on Rondeau Bay

In 2011, Rondeau received nearly 160,000 visitors. Park facilities include 262 developed campsites, six hiking trails, picnic areas, a boat launch, and a visitor centre with interpretive displays and programming. Popular recreational activities include hiking, cycling, fishing, hunting, birding, windsurfing. Birding is especially popular in May as migrant songbirds heading north stopover in the park. Windsurfing is popular on Rondeau Bay on days with strong southwest winds. Waterfowl hunting is popular in the marsh in fall; recreational hunting is otherwise prohibited.
