= Tupperville, Ontario =

Tupperville
- Unincorporated community
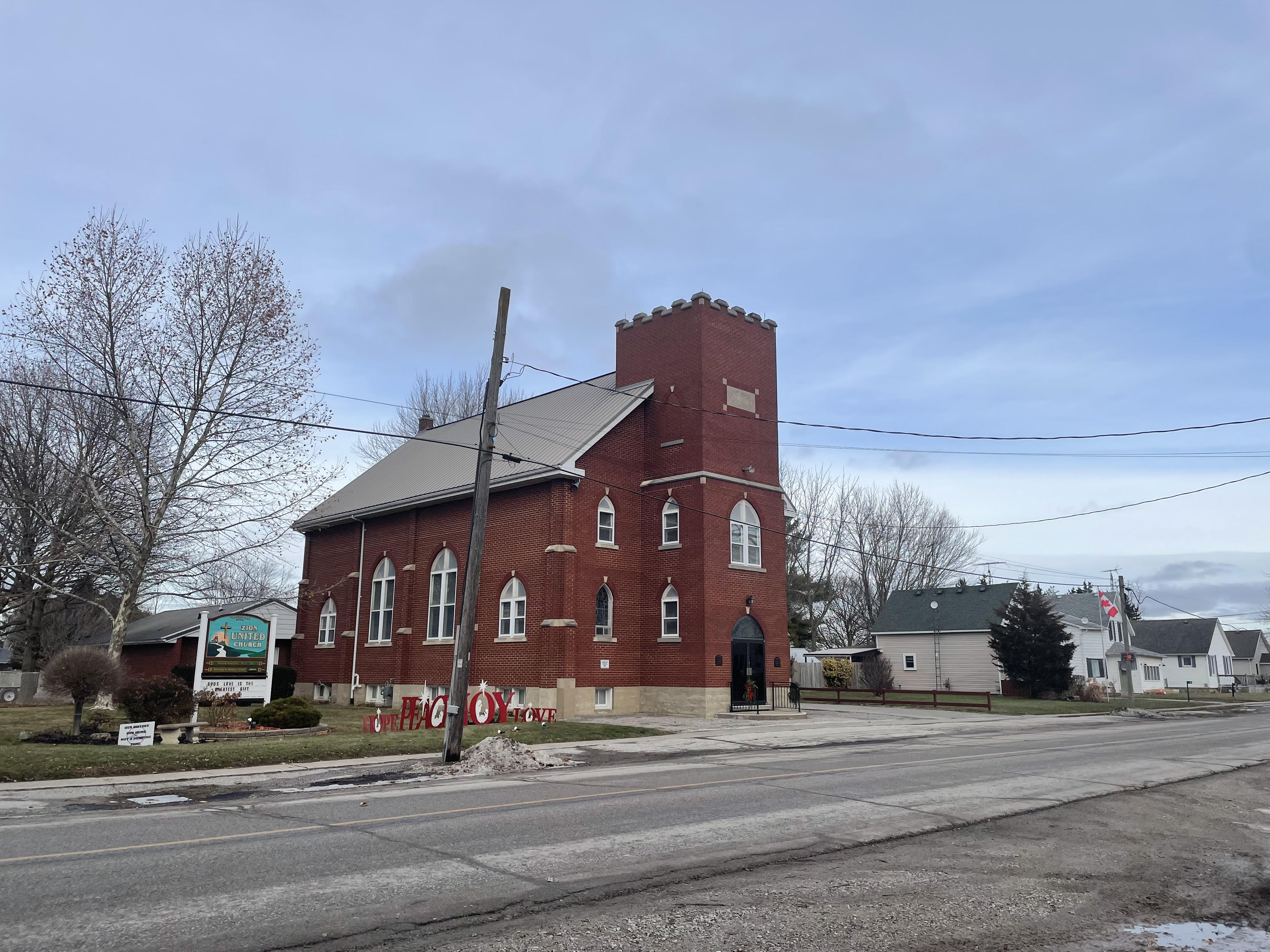
- Zion United Church seen from John Park Line in December 2025

- Location within Municipality of Chatham-Kent Location within Southern Ontario
- Coordinates: 42°35′24.5736″N 82°16′9.4296″W
- Country: Canada
- Province: Ontario
- Municipality: Chatham–Kent
- Time zone: UTC-5 (EST)
  - Summer (DST): UTC-4 (EDT)
- Forward sortation area: N0P 2M0
- Area codes: 519 and 226
- NTS Map: 040J09
- GNBC Code: FCXZE

Tupperville is a community on the Sydenham River in Chatham-Kent, Ontario, Canada and has a population of approx. 300 people. Tupperville was named after Canada's sixth Prime Minister Sir Charles Tupper.

Tupperville is located in close proximity to 2 larger towns - Wallaceburg (pop. 11,000) and Dresden (pop. 4,000). Thirty minutes south of Tupperville is the City of Chatham-Kent (pop. 42,000) and forty minutes north is the City of Sarnia (pop. 70,500).

== History ==
=== Settlement Era ===
During the early era of Tupperville, within the context of the European colonization in Kent County Ontario were the documented surveys conducted along the Thames River at the start of the 1790s under surveyor Patrick McNiff During the initial surveys, McNiff identified and mapped the nearby fertile lands and identified settlement potential as well as reporting on the quality of the land. The Initial land grants documented by Chatham Township where Tupperville is located, were formally accepted during the early 1800s.

=== Modern Naming ===
In 1883, Tupperville received its informal name in honour of Sir Charles Tupper, a prominent Nova Scotian Politician who played a large role in Canadian Confederation. The formal adoption of Tupperville did not occur until May 4, 1950, when it was approved by the Ontario Ministry of Natural Resources and Forestry, with endorsement from the Canadian Board on Geographic Names solidifying Tupperville as an unincorporated place. This renaming process aligned with post-World War II efforts to standardize geographical nomenclature across Ontario's rural communities.

=== Modern Tupperville ===
Modern Tupperville is a predominantly rural, agricultural community in southwestern Ontario, where resident families are often deeply rooted in farming traditions passed down through generations. Households are centred around agricultural lifestyles that emphasize community ties and land stewardship. Since the mid-1980s, Low German-speaking Mennonite families have settled in the area, establishing a private school to preserve their language, traditional values, and agricultural practices, adding to the community's cultural diversity. Due to Tupperville's small population, detailed demographic data specific to the unincorporated place is unavailable from census records.

== Geology ==
The area where Tupperville sits emerged from the former Lake Algonquin. In 1956, bones and teeth of mastodons were found a quarter-mile northeast of Tupperville on a shoal in Lake St. Clair.
