= List of elections in 1838 =

The following elections occurred in the year 1838.

== North America ==
=== United States ===
- 1838 United States elections

==== United States Senate ====
- 1838 and 1839 United States Senate elections

==== United States House of Representatives ====
- 1838 United States House of Representatives elections

==== United States lieutenant gubernatorial ====
- 1838 Connecticut lieutenant gubernatorial election
- 1838 Illinois lieutenant gubernatorial election

==== United States gubernatorial ====
- 1838 Connecticut gubernatorial election
- 1838 Illinois gubernatorial election
- 1838 Louisiana gubernatorial election
- 1838 Maine gubernatorial election
- January 1838 Maryland gubernatorial election
- October 1838 Maryland gubernatorial election
- 1838 Massachusetts gubernatorial election
- 1838 New Hampshire gubernatorial election
- 1838 New Jersey gubernatorial election
- 1838 New York gubernatorial election
- 1838 North Carolina gubernatorial election
- 1838 Ohio gubernatorial election
- 1838 Pennsylvania gubernatorial election
- 1838 Rhode Island gubernatorial election
- 1838 South Carolina gubernatorial election
- 1838 Vermont gubernatorial election

==== United States mayoral elections ====
- 1838 Boston mayoral election
- 1838 Chicago mayoral election

== See also ==
- Category:1838 elections
