= Samuel Atkins Eliot (politician) =

American politician (1798–1862)

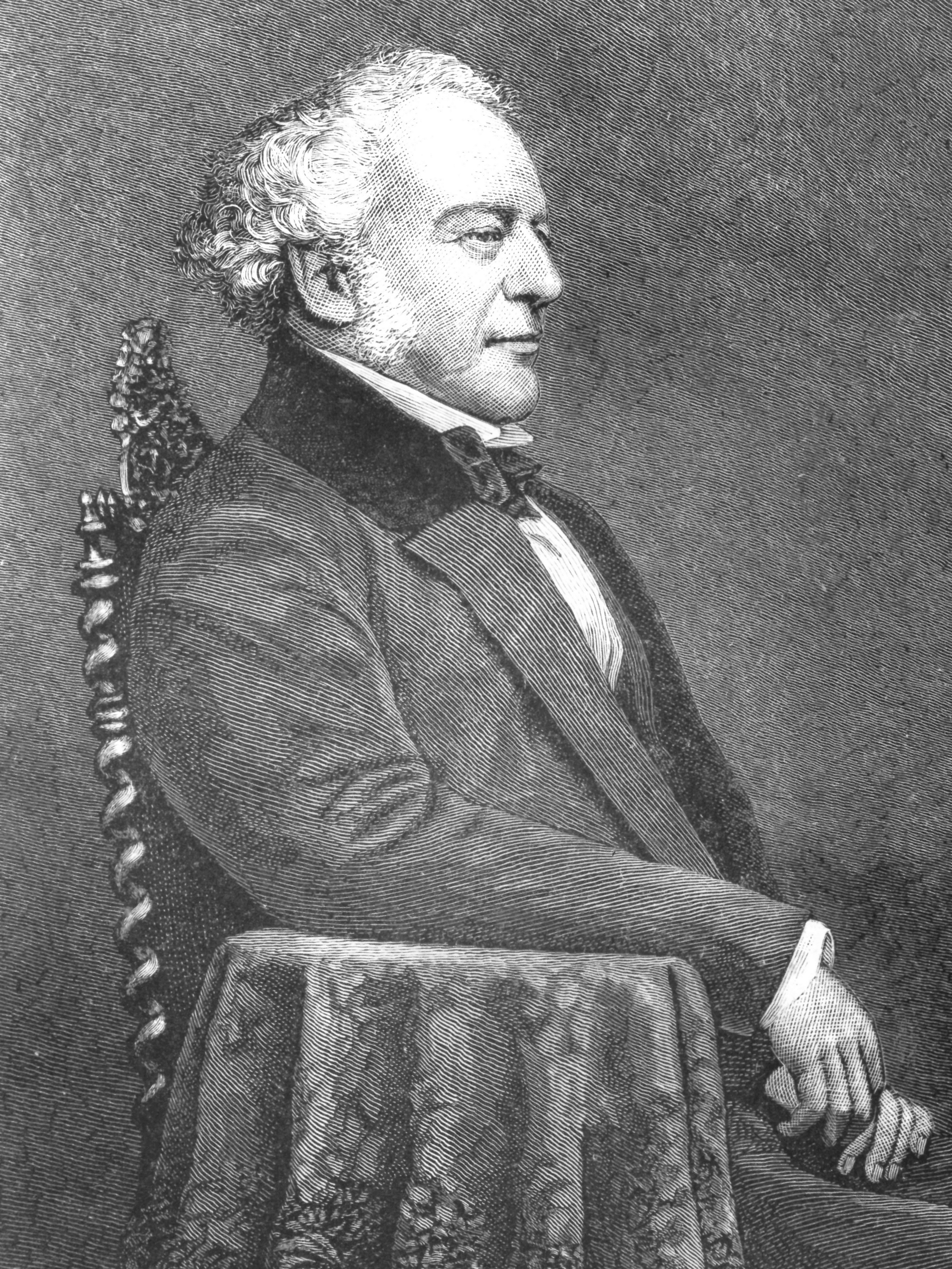

Member of the U.S. House of Representatives from Massachusetts's 1st district
- In office August 22, 1850 – March 3, 1851
- Preceded by: Robert C. Winthrop
- Succeeded by: William Appleton

Member of the Massachusetts Senate
- In office 1843–1844

7th Mayor of Boston, Massachusetts
- In office 1837–1840
- Preceded by: Samuel T. Armstrong
- Succeeded by: Jonathan Chapman

Member of the Massachusetts House of Representatives
- In office 1834–1837

Personal details
- Born: March 5, 1798 Boston, Massachusetts, U.S.
- Died: January 29, 1862 (aged 63) Cambridge, Massachusetts, U.S.
- Party: Whig
- Children: 6, including Charles
- Parent: Samuel Eliot
- Relatives: Eliot family
- Education: Harvard University

Samuel Atkins Eliot (March 5, 1798 – January 29, 1862) was a member of the notable Eliot family of Boston, Massachusetts, who served in political positions at the local, state and national levels.

== Early life ==
Eliot was born in Boston, Massachusetts, in 1798. He was the son of banker Samuel Eliot and Catherine Atkins Eliot, and was related to Congressman Thomas Hopkinson Eliot. He attended the Boston Latin School, and graduated from Harvard College in 1817 and from Harvard Divinity School in 1820. His father had wanted to see him become a minister, but he died the year of his graduation and Samuel stopped short of the pulpit. Instead he traveled Europe for two years, gaining great knowledge in music and singing, and developing interests in parks and playgrounds.

== Career ==
His interest in music led him to become president of the Boston Academy of Music from 1834 to 1847. As an influential member of the Boston school committee, he was successful in placing music in the curriculum of all public schools. With his brother William he founded the Union Church in Nahant, Massachusetts. Eliot built in 1827 a classical Greek revival summer home at 40 Steps Beach on Nahant Road. The Eliot family along with their son Charles W. Eliot, future President of Harvard, spent their summers until 1850 when the property was sold to the Mifflin Family. He served as the first president of the Boston Provident Association, one of the first organizations to aid the poor. He assisted developing the Prison Discipline Society, becoming its treasurer and president to reduce the miserable conditions found in the houses of correction.

He was a member of the Massachusetts House of Representatives from 1834 to 1837. Elected three consecutive terms between 1837 and 1840 as Mayor of Boston. During his administration a riot took place, caused by a collision between a volunteer fire company and an Irish funeral procession. The disturbance was suppressed by the promptness of Mayor Eliot, who was on the ground at the first alarm, and immediately took measures for calling out the militia. The result of this affair was the establishment of a paid fire department and a day police.

Eliot served in the Massachusetts Senate in 1843–1844. He was elected as a Whig to the 31st United States Congress to fill the vacancy caused by the resignation of Robert C. Winthrop, and served from August 22, 1850, to March 3, 1851; he declined to be a candidate for renomination in 1850.

He was Treasurer of Harvard University from 1842 to 1853.

He published a Sketch of the History of Harvard College and of its Present State (Boston, 1848), and additionally was editor for The Life of Josiah Henson, Formerly a Slave, Now an Inhabitant of Canada, as Narrated by Himself and also edited selections from the sermons of Dr. Francis W. P. Greenwood, with a memoir (2 vols., Boston, 1844). He contributed writings to the North American Review and the Christian Examiner.

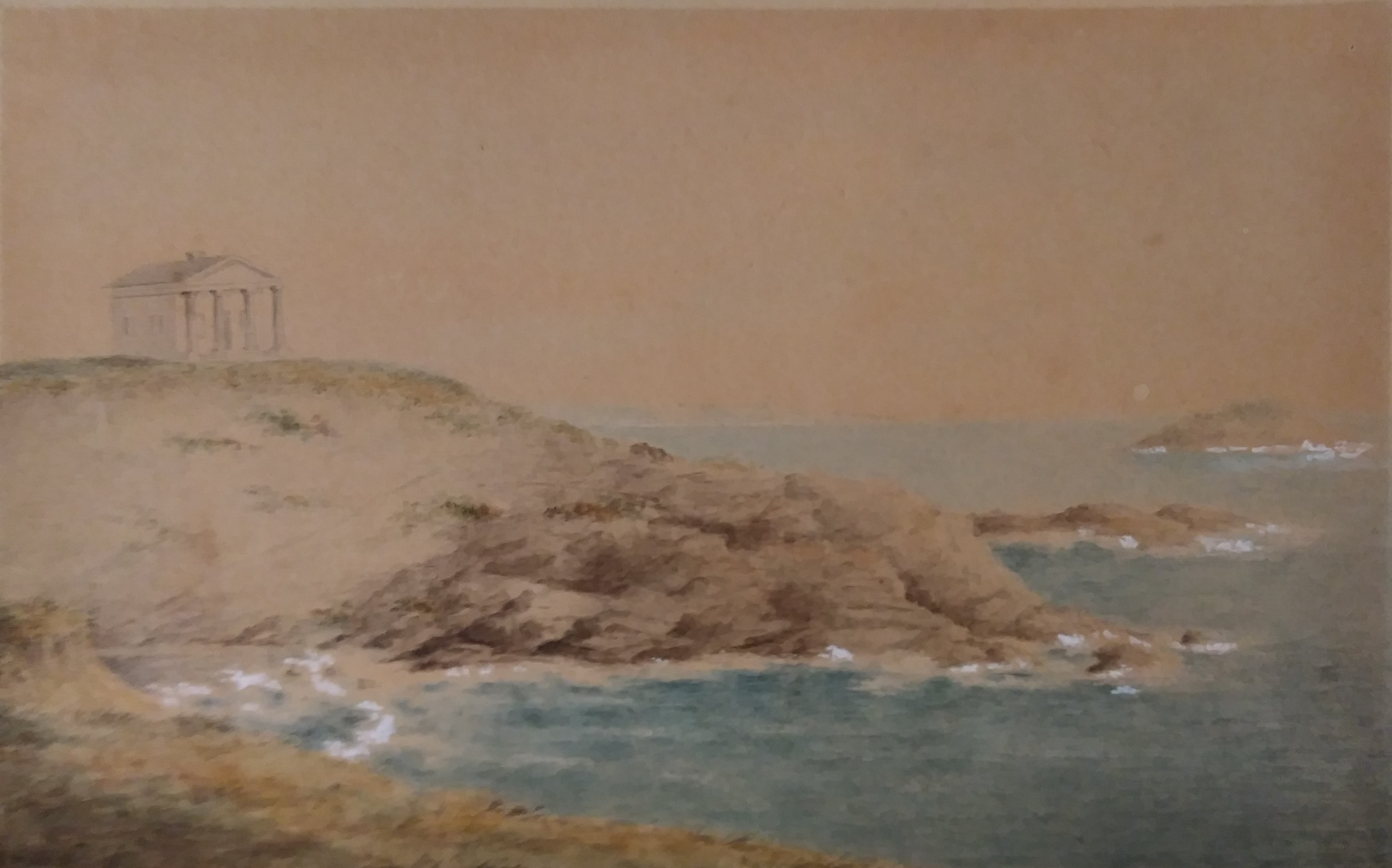
Samuel Atkins Eliot Summer House, 40 Steps Beach Nahant MA, Circa 1830

== Personal life ==
On June 13, 1826, he married Mary Lyman, the daughter of Theodore Lyman I (1753–1839) born in York, Maine, and his second wife Lydia Pickering Williams of Salem, Massachusetts, the daughter of George Williams and niece of Colonel Timothy Pickering, the third United States secretary of state under presidents George Washington and John Adams.

Lyman became prosperous in the East India trade and an influential merchant in Boston, building a country estate known as the "Vale" (Lyman Estate) in Waltham, Massachusetts, where his daughter Mary and Samuel would be married. The East Side Ballroom was added to the house for their wedding. The marriage produced four daughters and two sons, including Charles William Eliot, a future president of Harvard University.

Between 1829 and 1830 he built a lavish house at 31 Beacon Street, now the western edge of the Massachusetts Statehouse lawn.

He died in Cambridge, Massachusetts, on January 29, 1862, and his body was interred in Mount Auburn Cemetery.

== See also ==
- Timeline of Boston, 1830s
- 1836 Boston mayoral election
- 1837 Boston mayoral election
- 1838 Boston mayoral election
- 1844–45 Boston mayoral election

== Notes ==
Political offices
Preceded by Samuel T. Armstrong	Mayor of Boston, Massachusetts; 1837–1839	Succeeded by Jonathan Chapman
U.S. House of Representatives
Preceded by Robert C. Winthrop	Member of the U.S. House of Representatives from Massachusetts's 1st congressional district August 22, 1850 – March 3, 1851	Succeeded by William Appleton
