= 1836 Boston mayoral election =

Election in Massachusetts, United States

- December 12, 1836
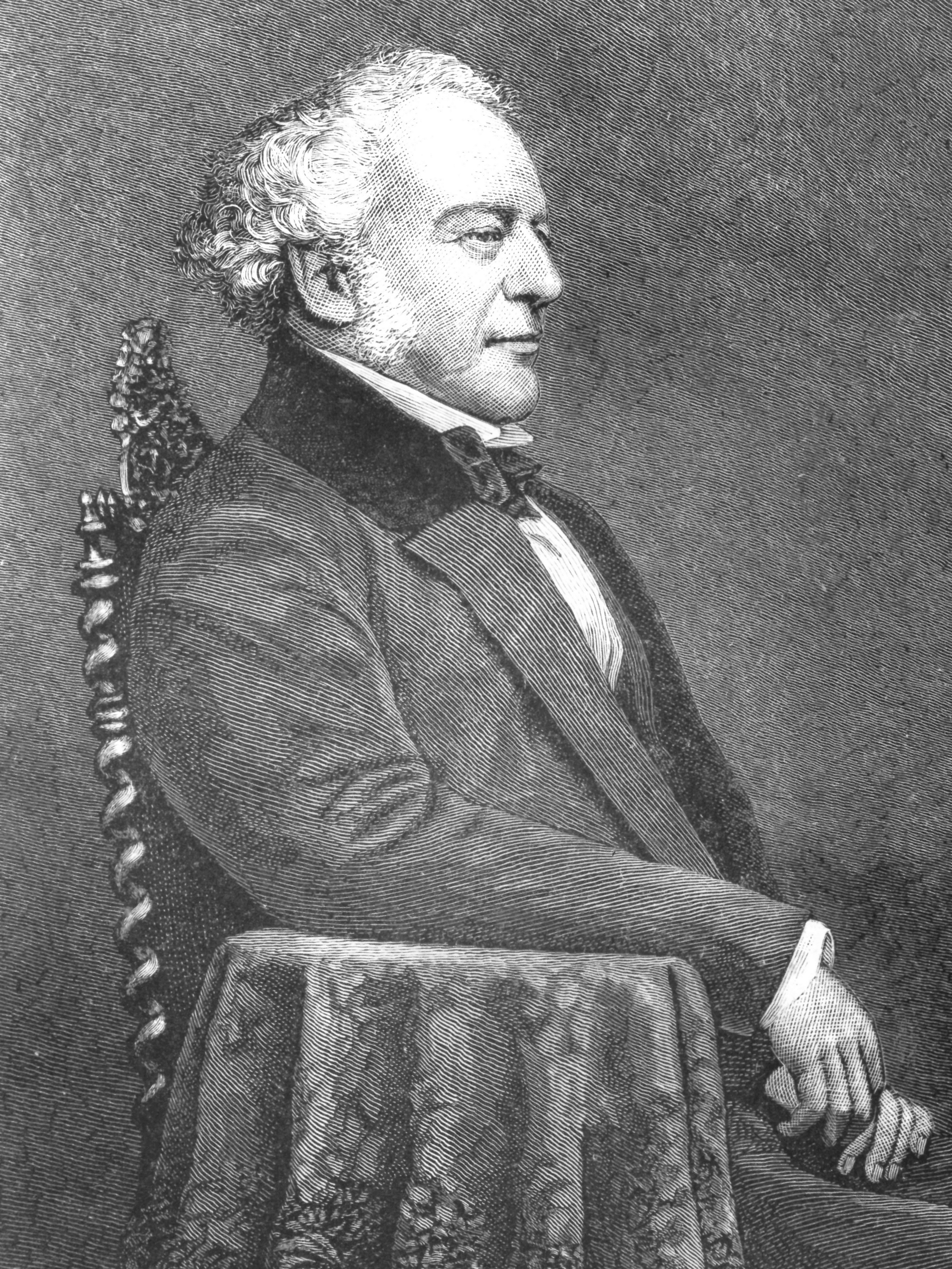

Candidate	Samuel Atkins Eliot	John W. James
Party	Whig	Democratic
Popular vote	3,238	1,667
Percentage	56.98%	29.33%
Mayor before election
Samuel Turell Armstrong
Whig
Elected mayor
Samuel Atkins Eliot
Whig

The 1836 Boston mayoral election saw the election of Whig Party nominee Samuel Atkins Eliot. It was held on December 12, 1836. Incumbent Samuel T. Armstrong was not a nominee for reelection.

== Campaign ==
Eliot was the Whig Party nominee. John W. James was the Democratic Party nominee.

In the coinciding municipal elections, all Whig Party nominees for Boston Board of Aldermen were elected.

== Results ==
1836 Boston mayoral election
Party	Candidate	Votes	%
Whig	Samuel Atkins Eliot	3,238	56.98
Democratic	John W. James	1,667	29.33
Scattering	Other	778	13.69
Total votes		5,683	100

== See also ==
- List of mayors of Boston, Massachusetts
