= George W. Lyman =

American industrialist (1786–1880)

George Williams Lyman
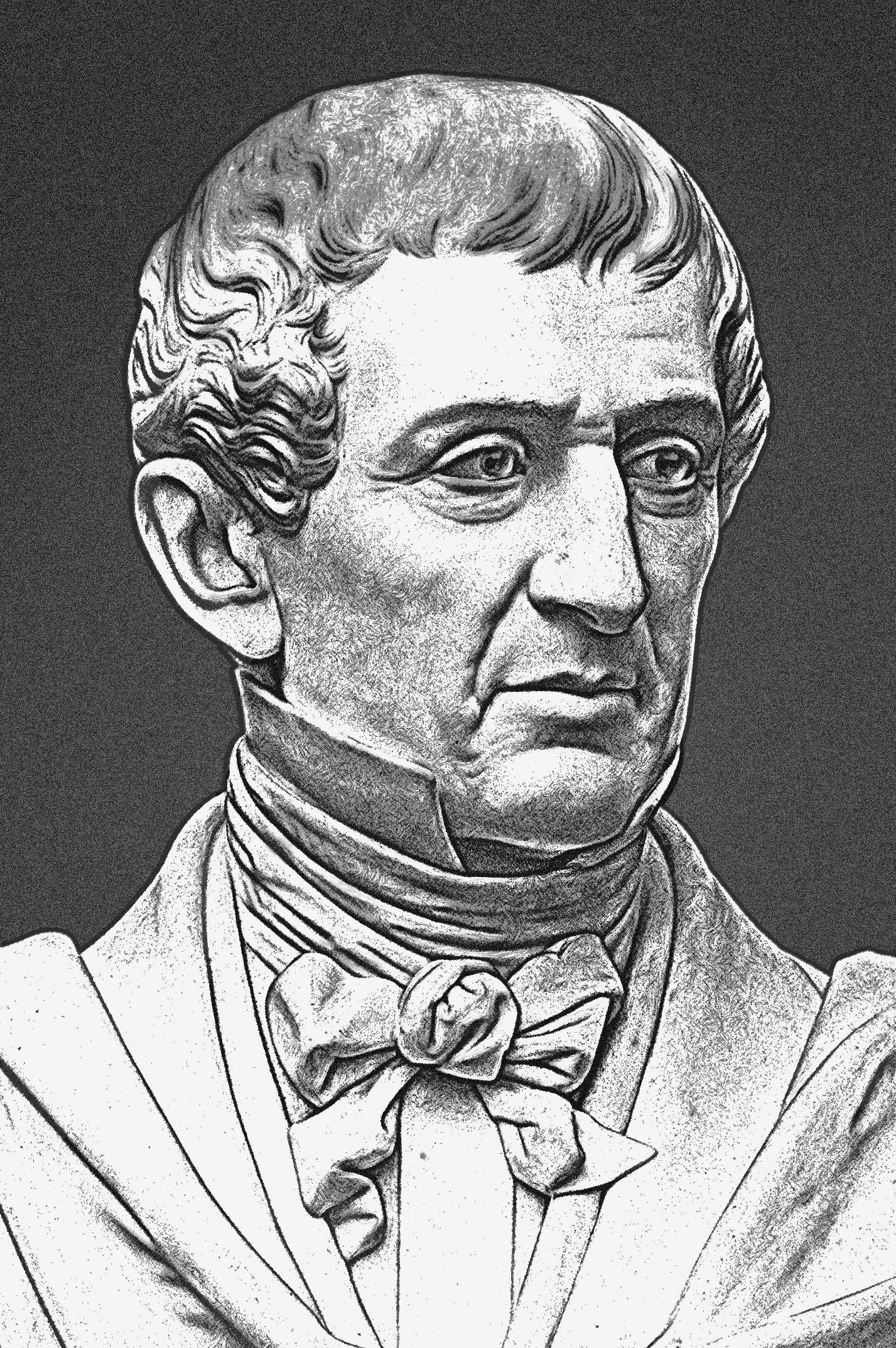
- George Williams Lyman, c. 1860, based on a sculpture by Richard Saltonstall Greenough
- Born: December 4, 1786; Kennebunk, District of Maine, Massachusetts, United States
- Died: September 24, 1880 (aged 93); Waltham, Massachusetts, United States
- Education: Harvard University, 1807
- Known for: Establishment and expansion of textile industry in New England and establishment of Hadley Falls Company
- Spouses: Elizabeth Gray Otis (m. 1810; died 1824); Anne Pratt (m. 1827–1875)
- Children: Arthur T. Lyman; George T. Lyman; Lydia W. Lyman
- Father: Theodore Lyman I
- Relatives: Theodore Lyman II (brother)

George Williams Lyman (December 4, 1786 – September 24, 1880) was an American industrialist and later described as one of the Boston Associates for his pioneering work in establishing textile mills throughout Massachusetts, and was one of the founding directors of the Hadley Falls Company which established Holyoke, Massachusetts.

== Early life ==
The son of merchant Theodore Lyman I, he worked for his father's business and continued trade with Europe, China and the West Indies until the Embargo Act of 1807 and War of 1812 forced him and his family to find new business pursuits.

== Career ==
From that time forward he was largely involved in the business of textiles, over the next several decades he would serve as treasurer of Appleton Company at Lowell (1832-1841), Hamilton Manufacturing Company (1833-1839), the Lowell Manufacturing Company (1831-1841), Pacific Mills (1856-1876) and took charge of the Lyman Mills of Holyoke during the Panic of 1857, remaining its treasurer until 1868. He also worked with inventor Erastus Brigham Bigelow to secure patents for his Ingrain carpet power loom under the Lowell Manufacturing Company.

Although not a founder of Lowell, Lyman was one of its earliest backers, and took an interest in the conditions of its workers, also serving as a director of the Boston and Lowell Railroad from 1821 to 1869. He was one of the founding members of the Hadley Falls Company which later became the Holyoke Water Power Company, and held a large interest in the Hadley Company which produced yarn and thread there.

== Personal life ==
Being his father's eldest son he inherited the Lyman Estate, "The Vale", in Waltham, Massachusetts, and took key interest in maintaining its grounds and gardens, often hosting members of the public. He was president of the Massachusetts Society for Promoting Agriculture for 14 years and also kept a herd of Ayrshire cattle, showing interest in the improvement of Massachusetts cattle stock.

Early in his life he was a member of the Federalist Party, but later was a personal friend of Daniel Webster and backer of the Whig Party. He was also a prominent supporter of the Boston Athenaeum, backing a number of its acquisitions during his life.
