= Theodore Lyman I =

American merchant (1753–1839)

- Born: January 8, 1753; York, Maine, US
- Died: May 28, 1839 (aged 86); Waltham, Massachusetts, US
- Burial place: Grove Hill Cemetery
- Occupations: Merchant, shipbuilder
- Known for: Role in the Old China Trade; builder of the Lyman Estate
- Children: George Williams Lyman (son); Theodore Lyman II (son)

Theodore Lyman I (January 8, 1753 – May 28, 1839) was an American shipping magnate in the Old China Trade, alongside other Boston merchants such as Thomas Handasyd Perkins and John Perkins Cushing. He built the Lyman Estate in Waltham, Massachusetts. His descendants included influential businessmen and politicians.

== Life and career ==
Lyman was born on January 8, 1753, in York, Maine, to Isaac and Ruth (Plummer) Lyman. His father was a minister originally from Northampton, Massachusetts.

In his youth, Theodore Lyman moved to Kennebunk, Maine, and clerked in the mercantile establishment of Waldo Emerson, whose younger brother, William Emerson Sr., was the grandfather of Ralph Waldo Emerson. Emerson died in 1774, and his widow died a few months later. Their only child, 13-year-old Sarah Emerson, inherited her parents' considerable wealth. Lyman married Sarah in 1776 and invested his new wife's fortune to build merchant ships in Kennebunk and engage in trade with the West Indies, potentially including the slave trade. During the American Revolutionary War, he served as adjutant of the Third York County Militia Regiment.

After the slave trade was curtailed in Massachusetts in 1783, Lyman pivoted to the China trade. He was among the first merchants to dispatch ships to the Pacific Northwest to trade with indigenous peoples for furs. The furs were then exported to China while silk, tea, ginseng, porcelain, and cloth were imported to the United States. He also traded Mexican silver for Chinese gold bullion. When the fur trade faltered, he traded opium instead. His Kennebunk-built ships included the Atahualpa, captained by William Sturgis.

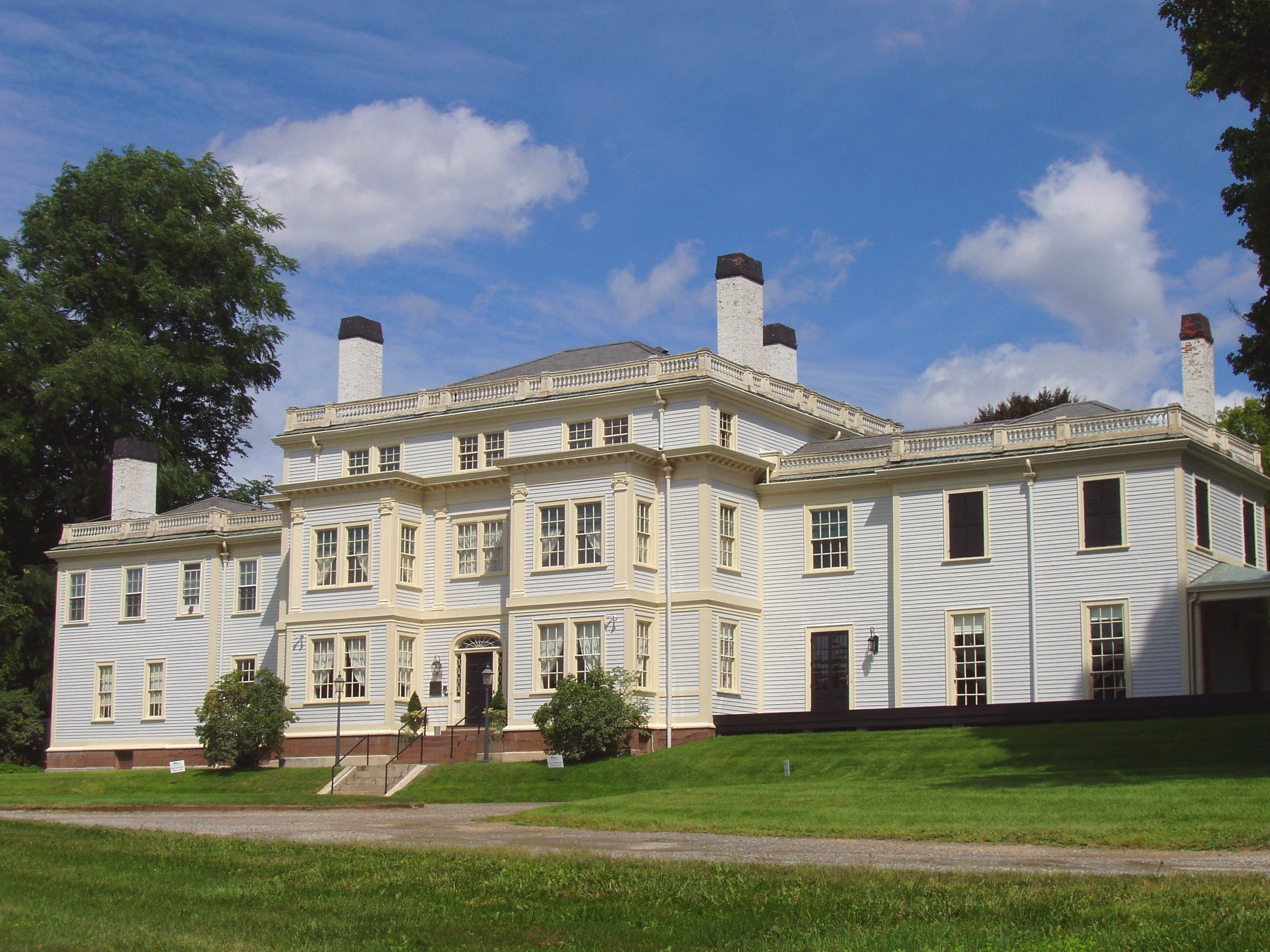
Lyman Estate, front of the mansion

In 1793, Lyman established a 400-acre country estate in Waltham, Massachusetts, where his descendants lived during the summer for 150 years. The Federal style mansion, containing 24 rooms, was designed by architect Samuel McIntire and completed in 1798. The estate had magnificent lawns, gardens, woodlands, a working farm, and one of the first greenhouses in North America. He also built the Lyman House in Kennebunk, which he sold along with his shipyard in 1805. From 1790 onward, he kept a residence on Boston's Beacon Hill.

On February 25, 1803, the town of Coxhall, Maine, renamed itself Lyman in his honor.

== Personal life ==
Lyman's first wife, Sarah Emerson (1762–1784), died in 1784 at the age of 22. On January 24, 1786, he married Lydia Pickering Williams (1763–1826) of Salem, Massachusetts. She was the niece of Secretary of State Timothy Pickering (1745–1829).

Four of his children survived to adulthood. His sons included George Williams Lyman (1786–1880), who inherited the Lyman Estate and became one of the Boston Associates, and Theodore Lyman II (1792–1849), who served as Mayor of Boston. His daughter, Mary Lyman (1802–1875), married Samuel Atkins Eliot, a Boston Brahmin who served as a U.S Representative from 1850 to 1851.

Lyman died at the age of 86 on May 28, 1839, at his residence in Waltham.
