= 1837 Boston mayoral election =

Election in Massachusetts, United States

- December 11, 1837
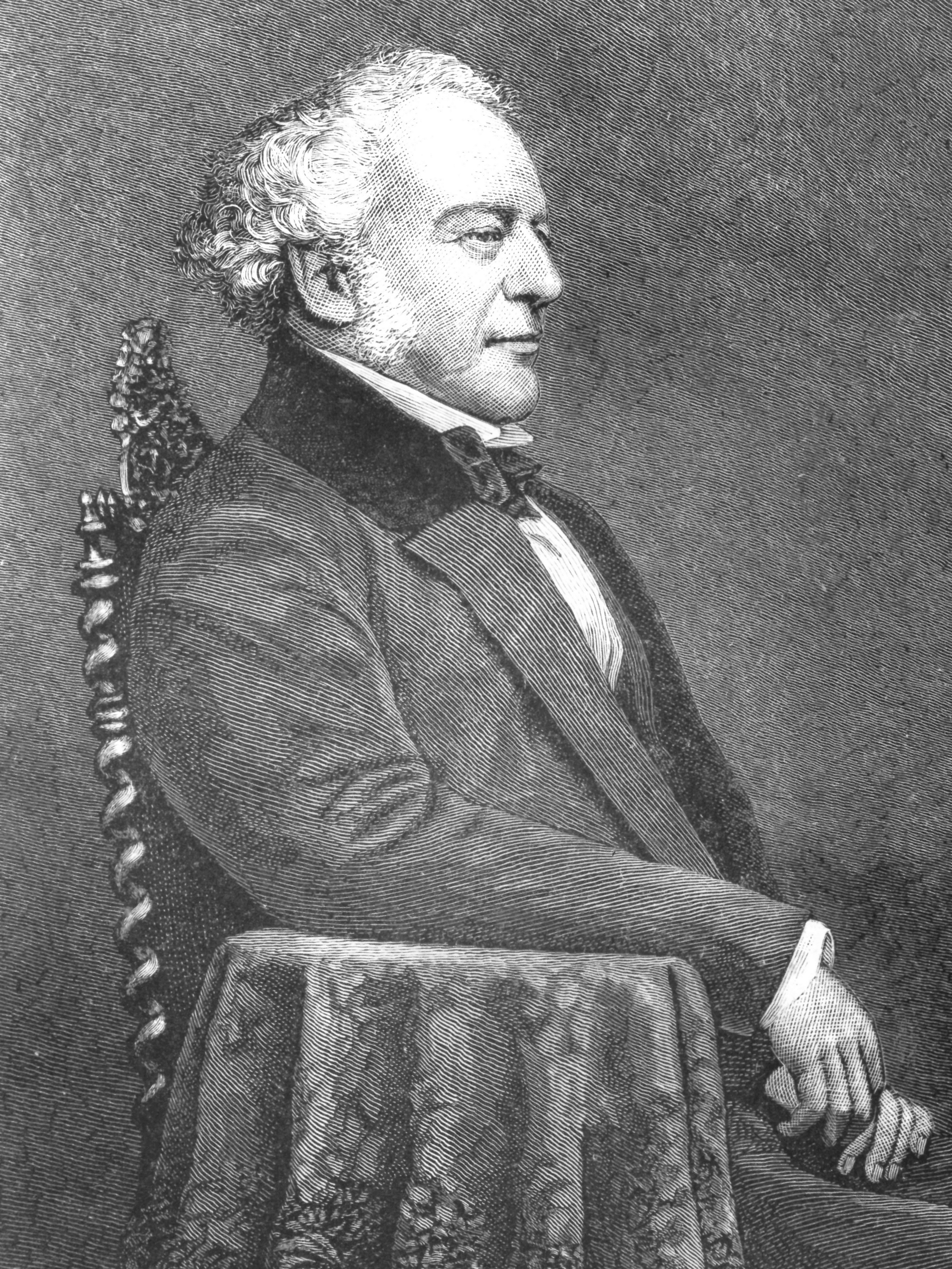

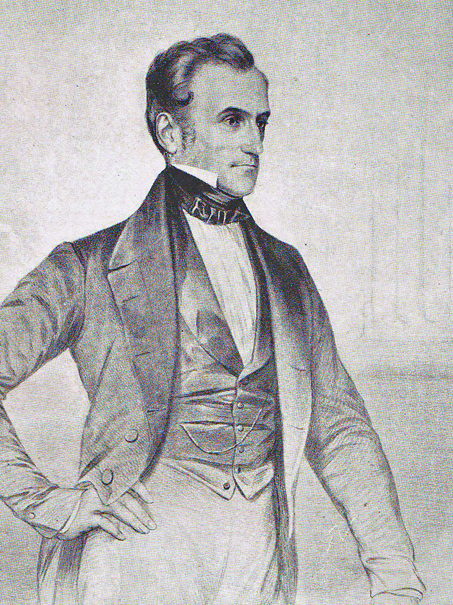

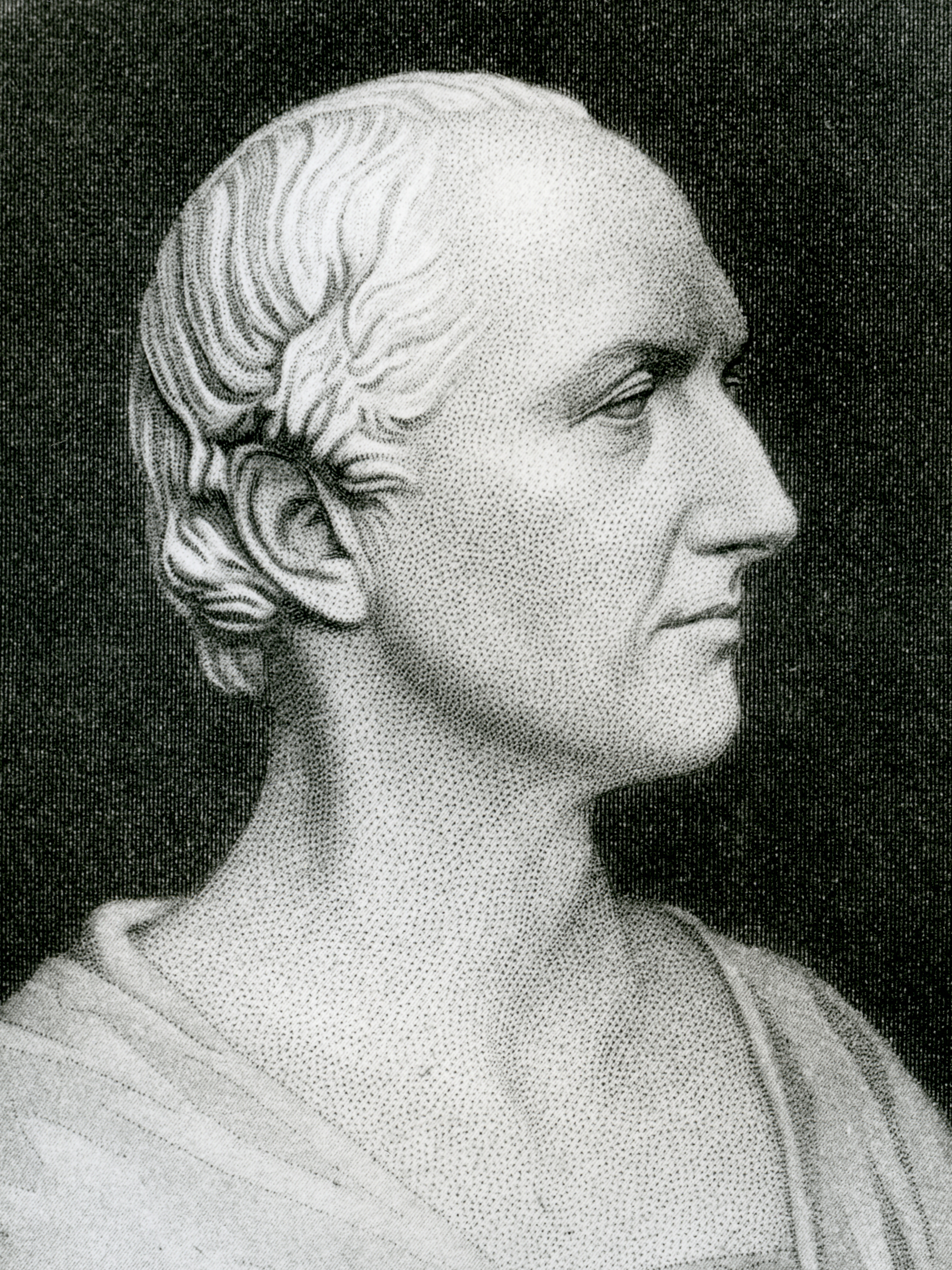
Candidate	Samuel Atkins Eliot	Amasa Walker	Theodore Lyman II
Party		Democratic
Popular vote	3,475	1,127	undisclosed large number of votes
Percentage	55.57%	18.02%
Mayor before election
Samuel Atkins Eliot
Whig
Elected mayor
Samuel Atkins Eliot
Whig

The 1837 Boston mayoral election saw the reelection of Whig Party incumbent Samuel Atkins Eliot. It was held on December 11, 1837.

== Candidates ==
Eliot sought reelection. Amasa Walker was the Democratic Party/locofoco nominee. Also running was former mayor Theodore Lyman II.

== Results ==
As part of the scattering, Lyman received more than 300 votes, by one account around 1,200 or more.

1837 Boston mayoral election
Party	Candidate	Votes	%
	Samuel Atkins Eliot (incumbent)	3,475	55.57
Democratic	Amasa Walker	1,127	18.02
Scattering	Other (including Lyman)	1,651	26.40
Total votes		6,253	100

== See also ==
- List of mayors of Boston, Massachusetts
