= Ignatius Sargent =

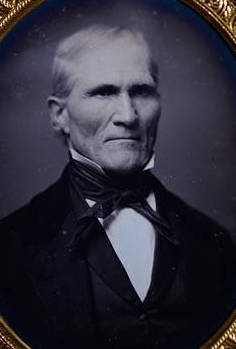
- Ignatius Sargent c. 1856
- Born: January 20, 1800; Gloucester, Massachusetts, United States
- Died: August 18, 1884 (aged 84); Brookline, Massachusetts, United States
- Known for: Horticulturalist, namesake of Ignatius Sargent Rhododendron
- Spouse(s): Sarah Charlotte Gray (m. 1828) Henrietta Gray (m. 1835)
- Children: Sarah Ellery Sargent (1829-1852); Ignatius Sargent (1836-1844); Henrietta Gray Sargent (1838-1923); Charles Sprague Sargent (1841-1927)

Ignatius Sargent (January 20, 1800 – August 18, 1884) was a merchant, banker, railroad executive, philanthropist, and horticulturalist who was best known for his contributions to the Massachusetts Horticultural Society and for being one of the Boston Associates who founded Lawrence and Holyoke, Massachusetts. Among his posts, he was president of the Globe Bank of Boston for 28 years, and remained a director there for nearly 50. He also served as a director of the Massachusetts Hospital Life Insurance Company, the first Hadley Falls Company, the Boston and Albany Railroad, and the Connecticut River Railroad. After retiring as a merchant, he spent his time after 1840 at a large farm in Brookline where he spent his time cultivating flowers and other plants, contributing to the Massachusetts Horticultural Society's exhibitions. With his wealth he funded $500 a year to support botanist Asa Gray so that he could devote "undivided attention" to completing his volume Flora of America. His interest in horticultural is credited with inspiring his son Charles Sprague Sargent, the first director of Harvard's Arnold Arboretum, to pursue his own career in that field.
