= Josiah Henson =

American abolitionist and minister

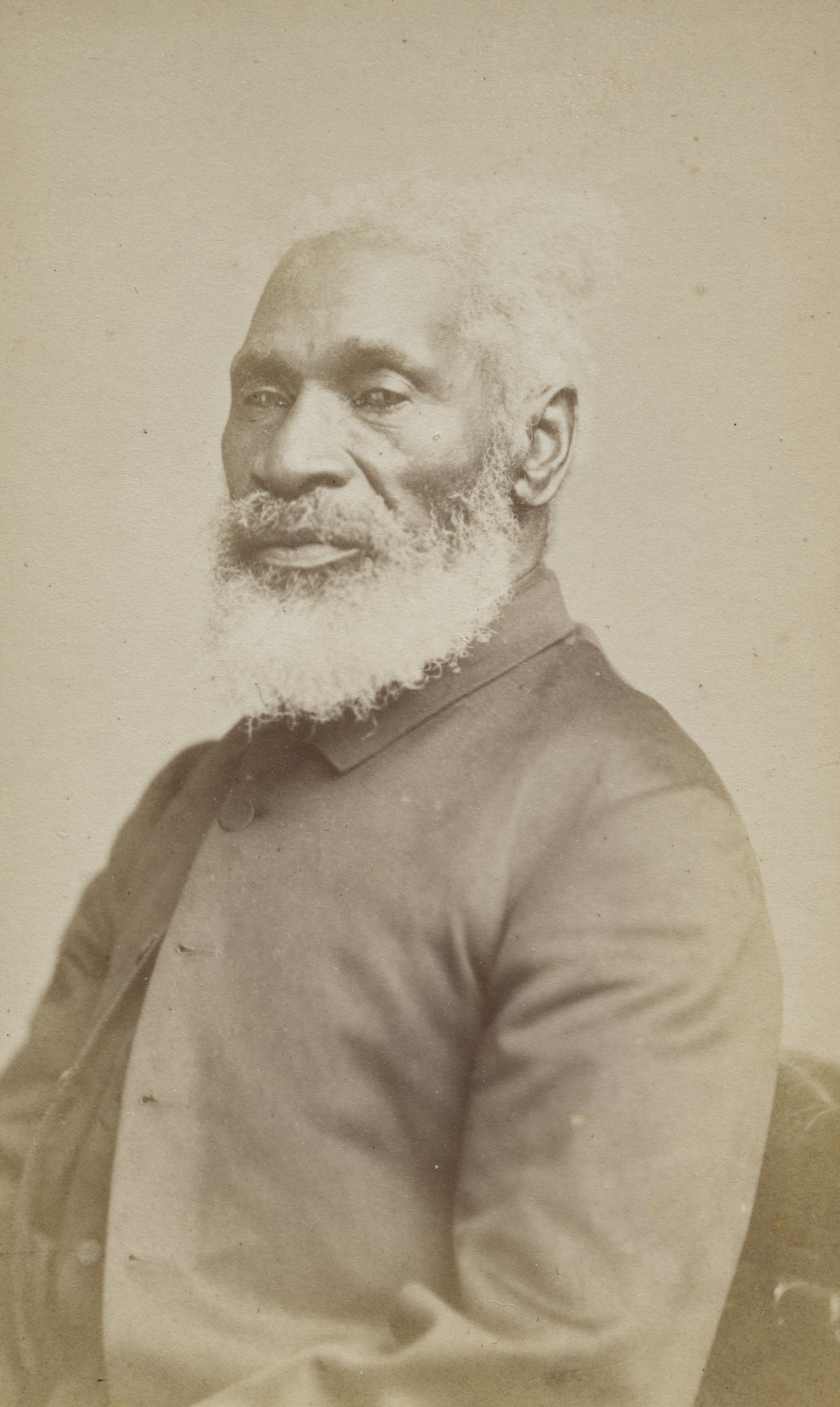
- Josiah Henson in 1877
- Born: June 15, 1789; Charles County, Maryland, United States
- Died: May 5, 1883 (aged 93); Dresden, Ontario, Canada
- Other name: Uncle Tom
- Occupations: Author; abolitionist; minister; colonizer; soldier; army officer
- Spouse: Nancy Henson
- Relatives: Matthew Henson

Josiah Henson (June 15, 1789 – May 5, 1883) was an author, abolitionist, and minister. Born into slavery, in Port Tobacco, Charles County, Maryland, he escaped to Upper Canada (now Ontario) in 1830, and founded a settlement and laborer's school for other fugitive slaves at Dawn, near Dresden, in Kent County, Upper Canada, of Ontario. Henson's autobiography, The Life of Josiah Henson, Formerly a Slave, Now an Inhabitant of Canada, as Narrated by Himself (1849), is believed to have inspired the title character of Harriet Beecher Stowe's 1852 novel Uncle Tom's Cabin (1852). Following the success of Stowe's novel, Henson issued an expanded version of his memoir in 1858, Truth Stranger Than Fiction. Father Henson's Story of His Own Life (published Boston: John P. Jewett & Company, 1858). Interest in his life continued, and nearly two decades later, his life story was updated and published as Uncle Tom's Story of His Life: An Autobiography of the Rev. Josiah Henson (1876).

== Early life ==
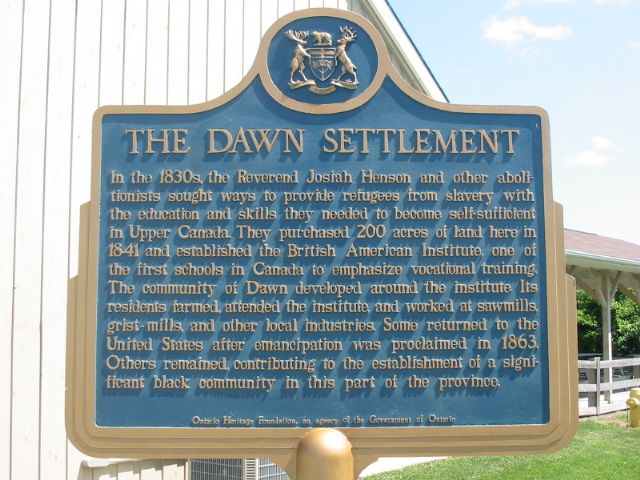
Provincial plaque, placed by the Government of Ontario, memorializing Henson's "Dawn Settlement", near Dresden, Ontario

Josiah Henson was born on a farm near Port Tobacco, Charles County, Maryland, on a plantation owned by Francis Newman, where Henson experienced slave atrocities. Henson's father was enslaved by Francis Newman whereas Josiah Henson, his mother, and his siblings were enslaved by Dr. Josiah McPherson. When he was a boy, his father was punished for standing up to a slave overseer, for which he received one hundred lashes. In addition, his right ear was nailed to the whipping post and then cut off. His father was sold away to Alabama. Josiah Henson experienced hardships and sufferings at the hands of his masters as well, including having his arms broken and an injury to his back. Following his family's master's death, young Josiah was separated from his mother, brothers, and sisters. At the slave auction, Henson's siblings were sold first. His mother was bought by Issac Riley of Montgomery County and when she pleaded to her new owner to purchase Josiah Henson, Riley responded by hitting and kicking her. Josiah Henson was sold to Adam Robb of Rockville, Montgomery County. Adam Robb encountered Issac Riley and struck a deal which resulted in Henson being sold to Riley and reunited with his mother. Josiah Henson became very ill. His mother pleaded with her owner, Isaac Riley, and Riley agreed to buy back Henson so she could at least have her youngest child with her, on the condition that he would work in the fields.

Riley would not regret his decision, for Henson rose in his owners' esteem, and was eventually entrusted as the supervisor of his master's farm, located in Montgomery County, Maryland (in what is now North Bethesda). In 1825, Riley fell into economic ruin and was sued by a brother-in-law. Desperate, he begged Henson, with tears in his eyes, to promise to help him. Henson agreed. Riley told him that he needed to take his eighteen slaves to his brother in Kentucky by foot. They arrived in Owensboro, Daviess County, Kentucky, in the middle of April 1825 at the plantation of Amos Riley.

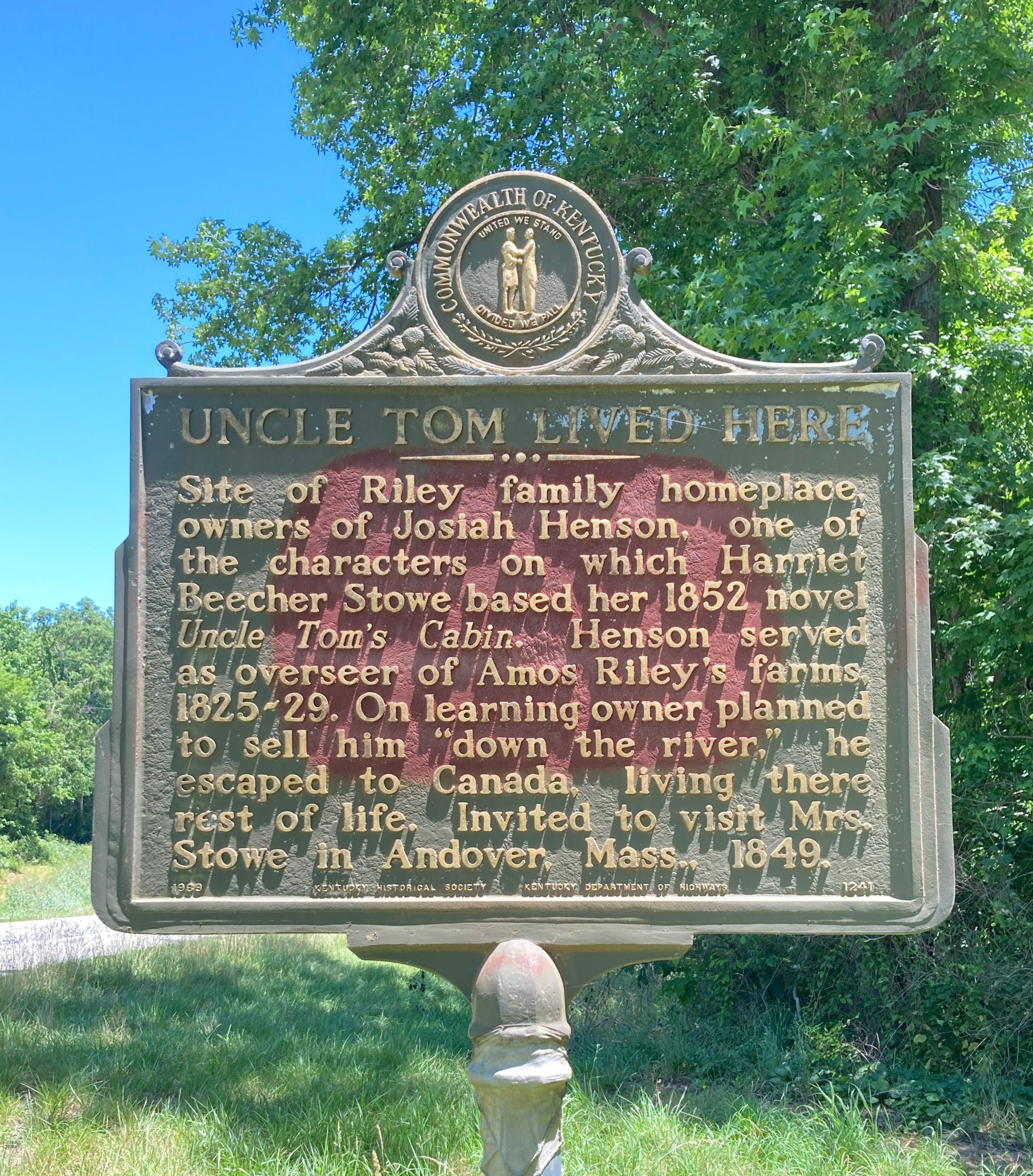
A roadside plaque near Owensboro, Kentucky, identifying the site of the Amos Riley home.

In September 1828, Henson returned to Maryland and attempted to buy his freedom from Riley, with $350 he had saved, along with a note promising a further $100. Riley, however, added an extra zero to the paper, changing the promissory fee to $1,000. Soon after, Henson learned that Riley planned to sell him in New Orleans, Louisiana, separating him from his wife and four children. Henson became determined to escape to Canada and freedom. He took his wife and their children.

== Escape from slavery ==
After convincing his wife to escape with him, Henson's wife created a knapsack large enough to carry both of their smallest children; the eldest two would accompany his wife. The Henson family left Kentucky, travelling through the night, and sleeping in the woods throughout the day. They crossed into Indiana, then into Cincinnati, where they were safely welcomed in a home for a few days. As the Henson family was crossing Hull's Road in Ohio, Josiah's wife fainted from exhaustion. As they continued on, they encountered Indigenous peoples, and were reinvigorated with food and rest. After crossing a lake in Ohio, Josiah encountered Captain Burnham, a ship captain, who agreed to transport the Henson family to Buffalo, New York; from there they would cross the river into Canada. Upon setting foot into Canada, Josiah Henson described the ecstatic feelings of liberation by throwing himself onto the ground and rejoicing with his family. On October 28, 1830, Josiah Henson became a liberated man.

=== Slavery policy in Canada ===
Upper Canada had become a refuge for slaves who had escaped from the United States after 1793, when Lieutenant-Governor John Graves Simcoe passed "An Act to prevent the further introduction of Slaves, and limit the Term of Contracts for Servitude within this Province". The legislation did not immediately end slavery in the colony, but it did prevent the importation of slaves. As a result, any U.S. slave who set foot in what would eventually become Ontario, was free.

== Later life ==
Josiah Henson first worked on farms near Fort Erie, then Waterloo, Ontario, moving with friends to Colchester in 1834 to set up a Black settlement on rented land. After earning enough, Henson was able to send his eldest son Tom to school, who in turn taught Josiah how to read. Henson became literate and was able to lead the growing community of fugitive slaves in Canada. Through contacts and financial assistance there, he was able to purchase 200 acres (0.81 km^{2}) in Dawn Township, in neighbouring Kent County, to realize his vision of a self-sufficient community. The Dawn Settlement eventually reached a population of 500 at its height, exporting black walnut lumber to the United States and Britain. Henson purchased an additional 200 acres (0.81 km^{2}) next to the Settlement, where his family lived. Henson also became an active Methodist preacher and spoke as an abolitionist on routes between Tennessee and Ontario. He also served in the Canadian Militia as a military officer, having led a Black militia unit in the Canadian Rebellion of 1837. In 1838, Henson and the militia successfully captured the rebel ship Anne, cutting off their supply lines to southwestern Upper Canada. Though many residents of the Dawn Settlement returned to the United States after slavery was abolished there, Henson and his wife continued to live in Dawn for the rest of their lives. Henson became the spiritual leader within the community and embarked on several trips to the United States and Great Britain where he met with Queen Victoria. While in Britain, Josiah publicly spoke to audiences and raised funds for the community back in Canada. Henson conducted several trips back to Kentucky to guide other slaves to freedom.

Poet Henry Wadsworth Longfellow welcomed Josiah into his home, Craigie House in Cambridge, Massachusetts as a guest in 1846.

In 1878, Rev. Henson was described as "a jovial old man", who "considering his age is pretty active".

Henson was a Prince Hall Freemason, belonging to Mount Moriah Lodge No. 11 under the Prince Hall Grand Lodge of Ontario and Jurisdiction.

== Origin as "Uncle Tom" Character ==
While Henson is often cited as the real life inspiration for Harriet Beecher Stowe's 1852 novel Uncle Tom's Cabin, there is some debate to the validity of this statement. Stowe made no written reference to Henson until the publishing of her follow-up book A Key to Uncle Tom's Cabin in 1853, which references Henson's book from 1849. Stowe more directly references the book American Slavery As It Is: Testimony of a Thousand Witnesses, which compiles stories from a number of different enslaved lives, including Henson's.

However, evidence suggests that Stowe first met Henson in 1852 following the publication of her book. This meeting is recorded in the biography Harriet Beecher Stowe: The Story of Her Life, written by Stowe's son. It is likely that Stowe read stories that contain similar narrative beats to Henson's life, and possibly Henson's own autobiography.

== Works ==
- The Life of Josiah Henson, Formerly a Slave, Now an Inhabitant of Canada, as Narrated by Himself. 1849
- Truth Stranger Than Fiction. Father Henson's Story of His Own Life. 1858
- Uncle Tom's Story of His Life: An Autobiography of the Rev. Josiah Henson. 1876
- An Autobiography of the Rev. Josiah Henson ('Uncle Tom') from 1789 to 1881. With a Preface by Mrs. Harriet Beecher Stowe, and Introductory Notes by George Sturge, S. Morley, Esq. M.P., Wendell Philipps, and John G. Whittier. Edited by John Lobb, F.R.G.S. Revised and Enlarged.

== Miscellaneous ==
Josiah Henson is the first black man to be featured on a Canadian stamp. He was also recognized by the Historic Sites and Monuments Board of Canada in 1999 as a National Historic Person. A federal plaque to him is located in the Henson family cemetery, next to Uncle Tom's Cabin Historic Site.

He was brought up in the 1975 Jeffersons episode "Lionel Cries Uncle", where Louise Jefferson's uncle Ward informs George Jefferson, who keeps demeaning Ward as being an "Uncle Tom," about Henson and how he was the actual inspiration for Uncle Tom.

A 2018 documentary titled Redeeming Uncle Tom: The Josiah Henson Story covers his life.

In 1978, plans were announced in Owensboro to recognize Henson with a memorial site in the city, but the recession of the 1980s put that plan on indefinite hold. In 1991, a playwright was hired to create a drama based on Henson's Daviess County years; in the summer of 1993, Josiah was staged at the RiverPark Center in Owensboro and its six-night run drew more than 4,000 people.

On May 6, 2025, Superintendent of Equitable Education Martine Robinson announced that the Durham District School Board was very excited to reveal the name of the newest elementary school opening its doors in September 2025 in the Pickering Seaton community: Josiah Henson P.S. After careful consideration and extensive consultation with the broader school community, the School Naming Committee selected the name Josiah Henson P.S., and it was officially approved by the Board of Trustees of the Durham District School Board (DDSB) at the Special Board Meeting held on May 5, 2025. Through meaningful dialogue and collaboration, the committee carefully reviewed community and student submissions and reflected on the vision for the new school community to arrive at a recommendation. The School Naming Committee made its selection from a shortlist of three community-informed options and strongly felt that naming the school in Josiah Henson’s honour reflects the Durham District School Board’s deep commitment to equity, anti-oppression, and the ongoing work to confront anti-Black racism. It also affirms the importance of celebrating Black history and heritage as a vital part of our collective story. The DDSB believes the name Josiah Henson Public School will serve as a powerful reminder to students and staff of the strength found in perseverance, the value of inclusive education, and the importance of striving for a more just and compassionate society.

== Historic sites ==
=== Josiah Henson Museum & Park—North Bethesda, Maryland ===
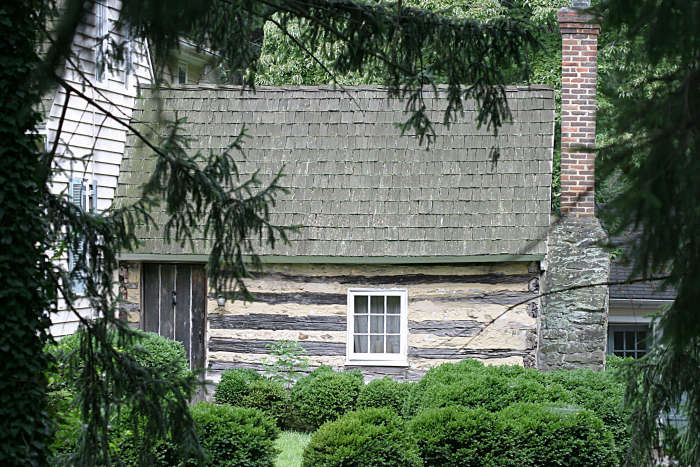
The 'Josiah Henson' cabin, in Rockville, Montgomery County, Maryland

The actual cabin in which Henson and other slaves were housed no longer exists; it was demolished along with other outbuildings in the 1950s when much of the former Riley plantation was developed into suburban tract housing. The Riley family house, however, remains and is currently in a residential development in Rockville, Montgomery County, Maryland. After remaining in the hands of private owners for nearly two centuries, on January 6, 2006, the Montgomery Planning Board agreed to purchase the property and the acre of land on which it stands for $1,000,000 (~$1.49 million in 2024). The house was opened to the public for one weekend in 2006. In March 2009, the site received an additional $50,000 from the Maryland state Board of Public Works for the planning and design phase of a multiyear restoration project. An additional $100,000 may come from the Federal government that would go towards restoration and planning. The site was planned to be opened permanently to the public in 2012, until then offering guided tours four times a year.

As of 2018, the Josiah Henson Museum & Park, in North Bethesda, Maryland, contains the Riley/Bolton house, where Henson's owner lived. The Montgomery County park site (construction/restoration) reopened to the public on April 23, 2021, after the completion of the renovations and installation of new exhibits and building of the visitor center. "Ongoing archaeological excavations seek to find where Josiah Henson may have lived on the site."

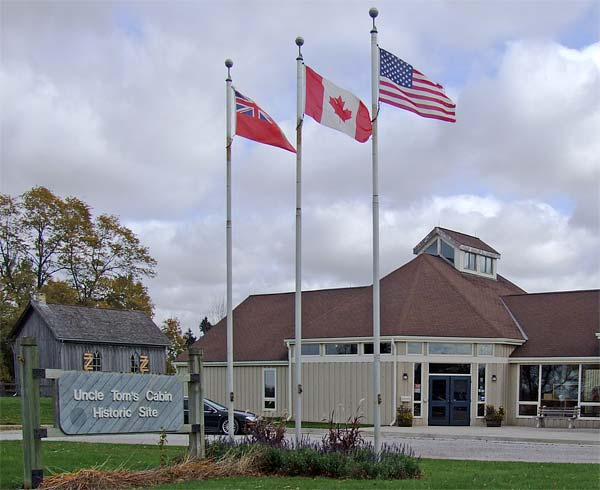
Josiah Henson Interpretive Centre, near Dresden, Ontario, Canada.

=== The Josiah Henson Museum of African-Canadian History ===
Located near Dresden, Ontario, in Canada, the Josiah Henson Museum of African-Canadian History formerly called Uncle Tom's Cabin Historic Site includes the cabin that was home to Josiah Henson during much of his time in the area, from 1841 until his death in 1883. The 2.0-hectare complex (5-acre) includes Henson's cabin, an interpretive centre about Henson and the Dawn settlement, an exhibit gallery about the Underground Railroad, outbuildings, a 19th-century historic house, a cemetery and a gift shop.

== See also ==
- List of enslaved people
