= Riley-Bolten House =

Historic house in Maryland, United States

- U.S. National Register of Historic Places
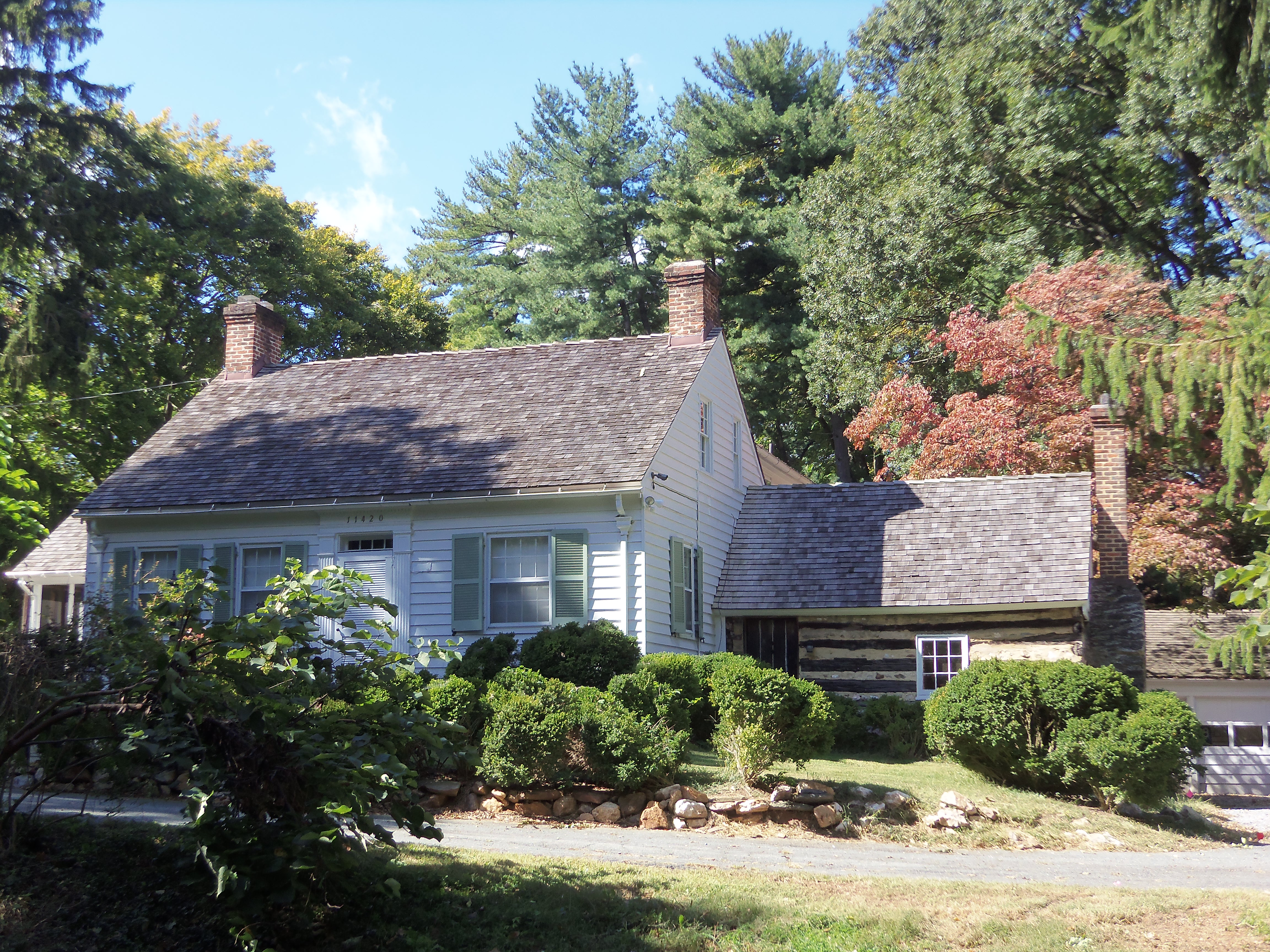
- September 2012

- Location within Maryland Location within the United States
- Nearest city: 11420 Old Georgetown Rd. North Bethesda, Maryland
- Coordinates: 39°2′38.3″N 77°7′17.8″W
- Area: 1-acre (0.40 ha)
- Architect: Lorenzo S. Winslow
- Architectural style: Colonial Revival
- NRHP reference No.: 11000961
- Added to NRHP: December 30, 2011

The Riley-Bolten House, known locally as Uncle Tom's Cabin, is a historic home located at North Bethesda, Montgomery County, Maryland, United States. It is a 1 1/2-story early-19th century frame house with a mid-19th century log wing, formerly located on the Riley plantation along with much of the suburb that presently surrounds it. Both the house and the wing were renovated between 1936 and 1939 in the Colonial Revival style according to designs by Washington, D.C. architect Lorenzo S. Winslow.

The house is one of several examples in the county of older homes that were renovated in the Colonial Revival style in the wake of the popularity of Colonial Williamsburg, developed in Virginia by the Rockefeller Foundation at the same time. It was originally the main house on an extensive plantation but was reduced to a 1-acre (0.40 ha) plot of land to serve as the centerpiece for a new suburban development in the mid-20th century.

An early owner of the home was Isaac Riley, who bought the enslaved Josiah Henson while living there. Henson was put to work on the plantation, in time coming to manage much of the Riley estate. The autobiography he produced after his escape, The Life of Josiah Henson, Formerly a Slave, was the model for Harriet Beecher Stowe's novel Uncle Tom's Cabin. The slave quarters on the Riley plantation where Henson actually lived were destroyed in the 1950s when much of the former plantation was developed into suburban tract housing.

The Riley-Bolten House was listed on the National Register of Historic Places in 2011.
