= The Life of Josiah Henson, Formerly a Slave, Now an Inhabitant of Canada, as Narrated by Himself =

1849 slave narrative by Josiah Henson

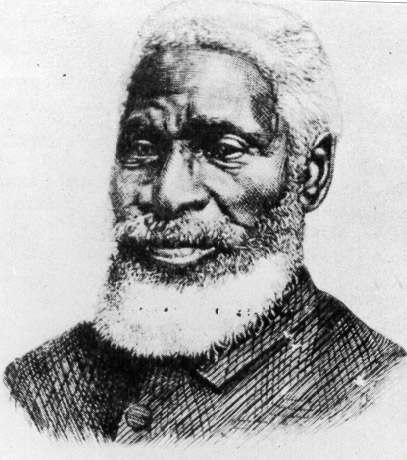
- Josiah Henson
- Author: Josiah Henson
- Language: English
- Subject: Slavery in the United States
- Genre: Autobiography
- Published: 1849 Arthur D. Phelps, Boston
- Publication place: United States
- Followed by: Truth Stranger Than Fiction. Father Henson's Story of His Own Life
- Text: The Life of Josiah Henson, Formerly a Slave, Now an Inhabitant of Canada, as Narrated by Himself at Project Gutenberg

The Life of Josiah Henson, Formerly a Slave, Now an Inhabitant of Canada, as Narrated by Himself is a slave narrative written by Josiah Henson, who would later become famous for being the basis of the title character from Harriet Beecher Stowe's 1852 novel Uncle Tom's Cabin. The Life of Josiah Henson, published in 1849, is Henson's first work but was dictated to Samuel A. Eliot, who was a former Boston Mayor known for his anti-slavery views. Although Henson was an accomplished orator, he had not yet learned to read and write. The narrative provides a detailed description of his life as a slave in the south.

== Publication history ==
Henson's autobiography was published in Boston in early 1849 by Arthur D. Phelps. Over the next three years, it sold 6,000 copies. It was reprinted after, with different pagination by the Observer Press of Dresden, Ontario, for Uncle Tom's Cabin and Museum in Dresden. When it was later known that Henson's narrative was the model for Uncle Tom's Cabin, his sale increased to a total of 100,000 sales. In 1851 it appeared in London and Edinburgh as The Life of Josiah Henson, formerly a Slave: As Narrated by Himself. It has now been reproduced by various publishing companies including Applewood Biks (ISBN 155709585X) and Dover Publications (ISBN 0-486-42863-X).

== Public reception ==
After the publication was released in 1849 it received little public attention until Harriet Beecher Stowe's novel, Uncle Tom's Cabin, was published in 1852. Soon after it became widely believed, and Stowe confirmed the connection, that Hensen's book and life experience was a major source of her work.

== Synopsis ==
=== Advertisement ===
This slave narrative begins with an 'Advertisement.' In the case of this book, the use of the word Advertisement is not to introduce a paid announcement to publicize a type of good or enterprise. Instead, its function is that of a notice to the readers to the fact that the work is the authentic work of Josiah Henson. The advertisement discusses the fact that the memoir was written from a dictation given by Josiah Henson, and so, the substance of the work is his own while "little more than the structure of the sentences belongs to another." Through the paragraph-long passage, to further authenticate the work, it expressly says that the work is "not fiction, but fact." (Henson, 1)

=== Birth/Childhood (p. 1 to p. 5) ===
The narrative begins with a description of Henson's life growing up. He was born June 15, 1789, in Charles County, Maryland, on a farm belonging to Mr. Francis N. He was the youngest of six children. His mother was the property of Dr. Josiah McP., but was hired routinely to Mr. N, who owned his father. His earliest known memory was of his father bloody and beaten. Henson eventually found out that his father had been beaten because he had beaten a white man for assaulting Henson's mother, which was punishable by Maryland law. His father's right ear was cut off and he had received a hundred lashes as punishment. His father, from that point afterward became a "different man" and the Mr. N. eventually sold him. Dr. McP stopped hiring out his mother afterward, but Josiah went to live with her for two or three years.

He expresses that his time on Dr. McP's plantation was some of his happiest. During this time he learned about God from his mother, who frequently recited the Lord's Prayer.

Not long after, Dr. McP died after falling from a horse and drowning. As a consequence, the doctor's property, which included Henson and his family, was divided throughout the country. On the day this was happening after watching her other five children get sold off, his mother was bought by Mr. R. (Isaac Riley). At seeing that Henson would not be bought also, she went to Mr. R and begged at his feet. He kicked her away and ignored her. Henson was then sold to another master, but after seeing that Henson had fallen sick, he was sold to Mr. Riley.

=== Life on the Plantation of "Mr.R" and Awaking to a New Life (p.5 to p. 14) ===
As Henson was still young when he arrived at the plantation of Mr. R, he was initially responsible for small tasks, like taking the men at work buckets of water. Eventually, when he was "older and taller", Henson went to work in the fields. Henson proceeds to describe the everyday life of a slave: Meals were given twice a day and they consisted of items like cornmeal and salt herrings, or vegetables that one might raise by themselves. Breakfast was served at 12 noon after laboring from daylight, and dinner when the workday was over. A single piece of coarse cloth was given to children, while the older individuals had a pair of pants or a gown, a hat once in two or three years, and possibly a jacket. They slept in log huts that could "not protect them from the dampness and cold, nor permit the existence of the common decencies of life."

By the age of 15, Henson states that he was a strong and athletic youth, filled with spirit and energy. He found that he could "run faster and farther, wrestle longer, and jump higher" than anyone around him. He was also found to be smart and clever. Because of his obedience, loyalty and usefulness, when Henson asked Mr. R if he could attend a sermon his mother had suggested to him, he was allowed to go.

While he was there he learned a text that would change his life: Hebrews 2:9, which reads, "That he, by the grace of God, should taste of death for every man." Henson was incredibly impressed by the fact that Jesus cared about every man, including a slave-like himself, as this was the first time he had ever heard anything of this sort. Henson also learned that Christ died for the salvation of the entire world, even the poor, even the enslaved. Henson looks back and remembers that day as his "Awakening to a new life."

=== Another Injustice (p.15 to p.18) ===
After this, Henson shares an anecdote about his master's involvement in more secular affairs.

His master, Mr. R, was routinely involved in drinking and gambling on Saturday and Sunday evenings. When he went, Mr. R. (as well as the other men in attendance) would usually bring a slave with them to help in the event that a fight broke out, or to get home because they were frequently too drunk to make it back or even get on their horses. On one such night, Mr. R fought with his brother's overseer. Henson, in doing his duty grabbed his master and took him home. Mr. L (the overseer) found that Henson had been too rough with him, and on a day that followed, he ambushed Henson. Mr. L, along with two other slaves beat him (although with some difficulty, due to Henson's youth and athleticism). As the fight carried on, Henson eventually lost the fight as well as full functioning in his arms (Henson would never recover full range of movement). Henson's master prosecuted Mr. L for beating and maiming his property, but Mr. L in response said that he was assaulted first and his master had to pay all of the costs of court.

=== Life as an Overseer & A Chance for freedom (p. 19 to p.24) ===
Henson worked as an overseer throughout the rest of his time on the plantation. As an overseer, the slaves he worked with received better food and treatment, while his master made a profit off of Henson's skills. At age 22, he married a woman who was very "efficient and well-taught." She belonged to a neighboring family. In the narrative, Henson expresses that in the 40 years they had been married they had twelve children, and he never had any reason to regret the union.

Soon after in 1825, Mr. R fell into economic hardship and was sued by a brother-in-law. Desperate, he begged Henson (with tears in his eyes) to promise to help him. Duty-bound, Henson agreed. Mr. R then told him that he needed to take his 18 slaves to his brother in Kentucky by foot.

During the trip, he and his companions stopped through the state of Ohio, which was a free state at the time. The people he encountered told him that he and those with him could be free if they wanted to be. Henson narrates that he never even thought of running away because the only way that he believed was right for him to get his freedom would be to buy himself from his master. He reports that he had a sense of honor about the subject and that he would not violate this honor even for freedom.

=== Davies County, Becoming a Reverend, & Turning Point (p.25 to p. 33) ===
They arrived at Daviess Kentucky in the middle of April 1825 at the plantation of Mr. Amos Riley. Henson was 36 at this time. The new plantation was larger, with 80 to 100 slaves, had an abundance of food, and more opportunities for Henson to attend religious events. From the years 1825 to 1828 he studied and eventually was made a preacher by a Conference of the Methodist Episcopal Church. In 1828, his master decided to sell all of the slaves but Henson and his family.

Not much later, in the summer of 1828, Henson met a Methodist preacher. The preacher found that Henson had too much capacity to remain a slave and came up with a way for Henson to gain the means to buy his freedom. The preacher instructed Henson to get permission to travel back to his master in Maryland, and that he would "try to put you in a way by which I think you may succeed in buying yourself."

So, in September 1828, Henson set out to return to Maryland. On the way, he gave various lectures, for which he was paid. By the time he got back, he had 275 dollars, a good horse and clothes that were of better quality than that of his master in Maryland. After returning he began to set in motion his plans for freedom.

He began by going to meet with Mr. Frank. Mr. Frank was the brother of his mistress in Maryland. The two had become good friends while Henson worked on the Maryland plantation as an overseer. Often, Henson reports, Mr. Frank wouldn't have enough food to eat and would eat at Hensons. Mr. Frank agreed to negotiate for Henson's freedom.

=== Almost Free (p. 33 – p.47) ===
Eventually, Mr. R agreed to give Henson his freedom papers for $450, with $350 in cash and the remainder in a note. Henson had enough to produce the cash, so all that was left was to pay the $100 note. On March 9, 1829, Henson received his papers and began to prepare to return to Kentucky. Upon leaving, his master stopped him.

Mr. R asked Henson what he would do with the certificate and if he would show it if he were stopped on the road. Henson replied yes, for that was the entire point of the certificate. Mr. R replied by telling him that he may meet some "ruffian slave-purchaser" on the way who will steal the paper and destroy it, then thrown him into prison and then back into slavery somewhere else. Instead, Mr. R suggested that Henson travel on the pass given to him by Mr. Amos (which gave him permission to travel), and the freedom papers would be sent off to Mr. Amos.

Taking the advice, Henson traveled on his pass. Upon arriving in Kentucky, Henson was made aware of his mistake of trusting his former master. Originally Henson only needed to pay an extra $100 by note. Mr. R, however, added an extra zero to the paper and changed the fee to $1000. Henson had been tricked and the only other person who could help, Mr. Frank, was miles away. He narrated that the trick had turned him into a "savage, morose, dangerous slave."

Instead of freedom, Henson continued to labor and was later taken on a work trip with Mr. Amos, in which he thought he would be killed or sold. While on the trip, Henson had the opportunity to kill Mr. Amos in his sleep with an axe. At the last moment, when he raised the axe up to strike, he stopped. A sudden thought came to him: "What! Commit murder! Are you a Christian?"

Henson never committed the crime, and was arranged to be sold as he suspected. Just before the day he was to be sold would begin, Mr. Amos woke up sick and it soon became evident that he had river fever. While sick, he begged for Henson to help him, which Henson did. Henson attended to all of the tasks asked of him. Mr. Amos became so sick that Henson had to nurse him over the next twelve days it took to return home to Kentucky. Amos was unable to speak or even move throughout the entire ordeal.

=== Escaping to Canada (p.48 to p. 56) ===
Eventually, Mr. Amos began to recover at home. As soon as he was able to speak, he told his family about how good Henson had been to him, and that if he had sold Henson, he would have died. He was acknowledged by the family for the work he had done, but Henson believed that they would still try to sell him again. Henson, as a result began to plot again to gain freedom for himself and his family. He was determined to escape to Canada.

While it took convincing, eventually his wife agreed to the plans Henson had created to escape. He had her make a large knapsack that was big enough to hold the two smallest children on his back. In the days prior he would walk around with them on his back so that they could adjust to being in the sack and he could adjust to it. He planned for his wife to lead the second to oldest boy, and the oldest boy, Tom, to walk on his own as well as help him carry the necessary food.

In the middle of September by 9pm they were ready and headed out together. A slave took them across the river to the Indiana shore. Once they reached they traveled at night for a fortnight until they reached Cincinnati. Once there they were "kindly received and entertained for several days" and then headed north again. Low on provisions and in unfamiliar territory, they continued on, traveling by night. While walking, they were confronted with a group of Native Americans.

The Native Americans took one look at them and then ran away. Henson surmised that they had never met a black person. They came back with their chief. After the chief realized that the group was indeed human, they were received warmly- if not with some curiosity. They were given food resources and allowed them a wigwam to rest in.

With the help of the Native Americans, they were able to find the rest of their way north through the woods. Before long they encountered a vessel with men working to load corn into it. After being received by them, Henson spoke to the captain who received him warmly and agreed to take them to Buffalo, which is where they were headed. Once in Buffalo, that captain, who was a Scotsman, paid for their ferry boat to the village of Waterloo, now part of Fort Erie. There is a small park, Freedom Park, which commemorates the ferry landing site.

=== A New Life in Canada (p.57 to p.64) ===
On October 28, 1830, they reached Canada. Upon reaching the shore, Henson threw himself on the ground and rolled around in excitement. A man from the neighborhood thought that he was having a fit (probably a seizure) and, concerned, asked what was wrong. Henson jumped up and exclaimed that he was Free. Soon, he set about to find lodging and a way to live.

Henson was pointed in the direction of Mr. Hibbard, who hired him and leased to him a shabby two story place that some pigs had taken to live in. After expelling the pigs, he spent the day cleaning it as best as he could. At the end of the day he brought the rest of his family to the house. "Though there was nothing but walls and floors we were all in a state of great delight, and my old woman laughed and acknowledged that it was worth while."

Over the next three years, they fell into a comfortable life in which Hibbard was happy with his labor and Mrs. Hibbard and Mrs. Henson became friends.

Mr Hibbard gave Tom, the eldest son schooling, and the schoolmaster added more quarters out of kindness, so Tom learned to read and write well. Once Henson got back into the habit of preaching, he would enlist Tom to read him verses in private and at the pulpit. At one instance Tom asked Henson a question that Henson could not answer, and realized that his father could not read. So, Tom resolved to teach him.

=== A Black Colony (p. 65 to p.72) ===
Within time, Henson began the efforts for which he became known. He and some associates decided that they wanted to create a colony of sorts in which they would raise their own crops and food. Towards the head of Lake Erie, a piece of government land was found and it was decided that they would stay there. The land was owned by a Mr. McCormick, who had not complied with the conditions of his grant for the land. They decided to buy it from him and the government. Over the next six years blacks continued to move from the States.
