= 1835 Boston mayoral election =

Election in Massachusetts, United States

- December 14, 1835
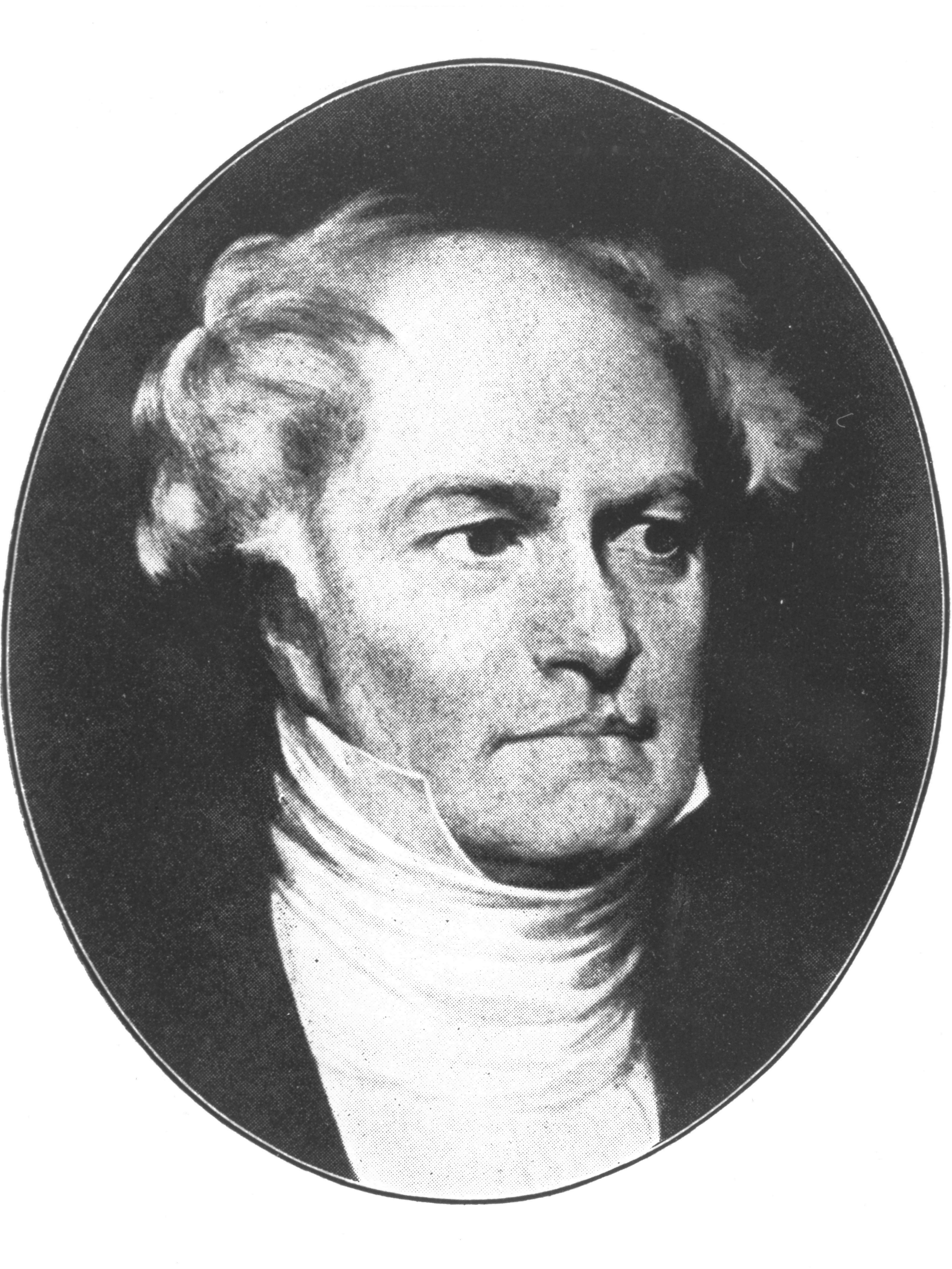

Candidate	Samuel Turell Armstrong	John W. James
Party	Whig
Popular vote	3,039	1,185
Percentage	67.64%	26.37%
Mayor before election
Theodore Lyman II
Elected mayor
Samuel Turell Armstrong
Whig

The 1835 Boston mayoral election saw the election of Whig Party nominee Samuel Turell Armstrong. It was held on December 14, 1835.

Incumbent mayor Theodore Lyman II was not a candidate for reelection, declining to run. He had been given the Whig Party nomination, but declined to run, at which point Lieutenant Governor Samuel Turell Armstrong was nominated. Armstrong was regarded to be the major front-runner to win.

== Results ==
1835 Boston mayoral election
Party	Candidate	Votes	%
Whig	Samuel Turell Armstrong	3,039	67.64
	John W. James	1,185	26.37
Scattering	Other	269	5.99
Total votes		4,493	100

== See also ==
- List of mayors of Boston, Massachusetts
