= Samuel Turell Armstrong =

American printer and politician (1784–1850)

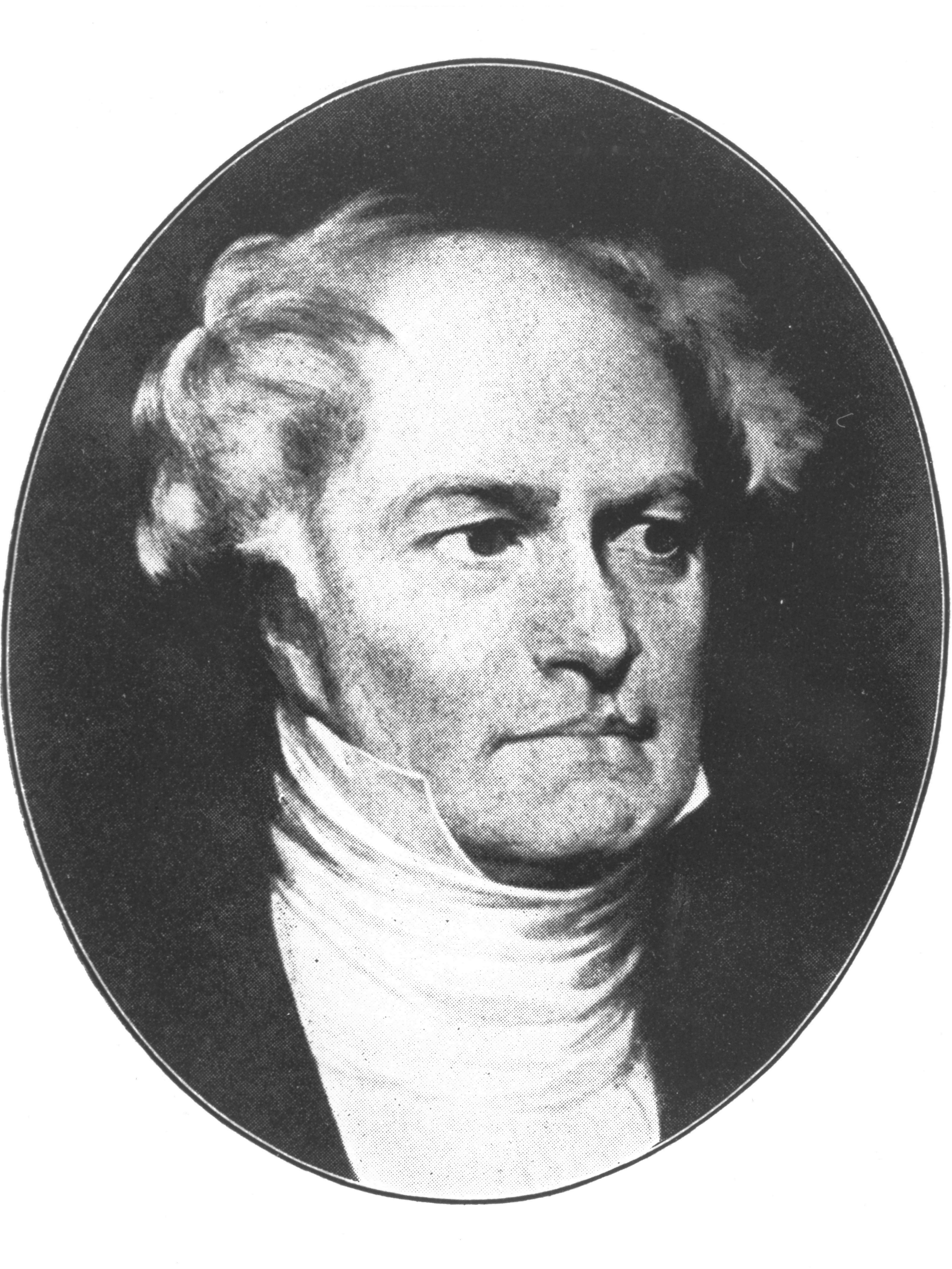

Acting Governor of Massachusetts
- In office March 1, 1835 – March 13, 1836

14th Lieutenant Governor of Massachusetts
- In office 1833–1836
- Governor: Levi Lincoln Jr. John Davis
- Preceded by: Thomas L. Winthrop
- Succeeded by: George Hull

6th Mayor of Boston, Massachusetts
- In office 1836
- Preceded by: Theodore Lyman
- Succeeded by: Samuel A. Eliot

Member of the Massachusetts Senate
- In office 1839

Personal details
- Born: April 29, 1784 Dorchester, Massachusetts
- Died: March 26, 1850 (aged 65) Boston, Massachusetts
- Party: Democratic-Republican; Whig
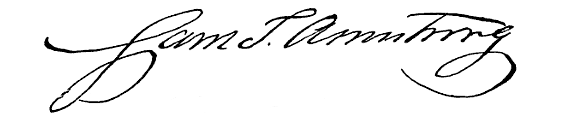
- Signature

Samuel Turell Armstrong (April 29, 1784 – March 26, 1850) was an American politician. Born in 1784 in Dorchester, Massachusetts, he was a printer and bookseller in Boston, specializing in religious materials. Among his works were an early stereotype edition of Scott's Family Bible, which was very popular, and The Panoplist, a religious magazine devoted to missionary interests.

Armstrong began to withdraw from the printing business in 1825, and focused instead on politics. He was active in Boston politics during the 1820s, twice winning a seat in the Massachusetts General Court (state legislature). In 1833 he was elected the lieutenant governor of Massachusetts as a Whig, and served three consecutive annual terms. For most of the last term he was acting governor after Governor John Davis resigned to take a seat in the United States Senate. He lost a bid to be elected governor in his own right in 1836, but was elected Mayor of Boston, a post he held for one year.

== Printer and bookseller ==
Samuel Armstrong was born on April 29, 1784, in Dorchester, Massachusetts, to John Armstrong and Elizabeth (Williams) Armstrong. His father, a military man, died when he was ten, and his mother died three years later. He was apprenticed to Manning and Loring, bookbinders and printers who were described as "the principal book-printers in the town" of Boston. Following his apprenticeship he opened a print shop with a partner in Boston, but a few years later opened his own business in Charlestown.

In 1807 he was elected as a member of the Ancient and Honorable Artillery Company of Massachusetts. He was elected as the first sergeant of the Company in 1811. He also served as the captain of the Warren Phalanx of Charlestown from 1811 to 1814.

In 1811 he returned the business to Boston, establishing a bookshop on Cornhill. His principal business was in the printing of religious tracts; his most notable work was in publishing The Panoplist, a religious magazine devoted to missionary matters. Another major success was his printing of the first stereotype edition of Scott's Family Bible, a highly popular work that sold tens of thousands of copies. He also opened his bookshop for church-related activities, including fundraising for foreign missionary work.

After he moved to Boston, Armstrong took on two apprentices, Uriel Crocker and Osmyn Brewster. In 1818, upon the end of their apprenticeship, Armstrong turned over operation of the printing business to them (which then became known as Crocker & Brewster) and focused his activities on the bookshop. In 1825, he withdrew from the day-to-day operations of the business, but would retain a financial stake until 1840. He continued to maintain a personal interest in the business until his death. The business was a significant financial success, and made Armstrong fairly wealthy.

== Church and politics ==
Armstrong was a member of the Old South Church. He served on its vestry (including as its secretary), and was chosen deacon in 1829. When the church was formally incorporated in 1844 Armstrong was named as one of its proprietors. In 1816 Armstrong discovered the original manuscript of the third volume of colonial Governor John Winthrop's History of New England in the church's tower; the volume was presented to the Massachusetts Historical Society. He was also in part responsible for the church's loss of a perfect specimen of the 17th century Bay Psalm Book, one of five that had been willed to the church by Thomas Prince, an early minister of the congregation. Writer Robert Wallace suggests that Armstrong's trade of two copies of the book in exchange for offers by the recipients, George Livermore and Edward Crowninshield, to rebind the other copies was naive, and was essentially a scam by Livermore and Crowninshield (both knowledgeable in the rare book trade) to acquire the valuable books for a bargain price.

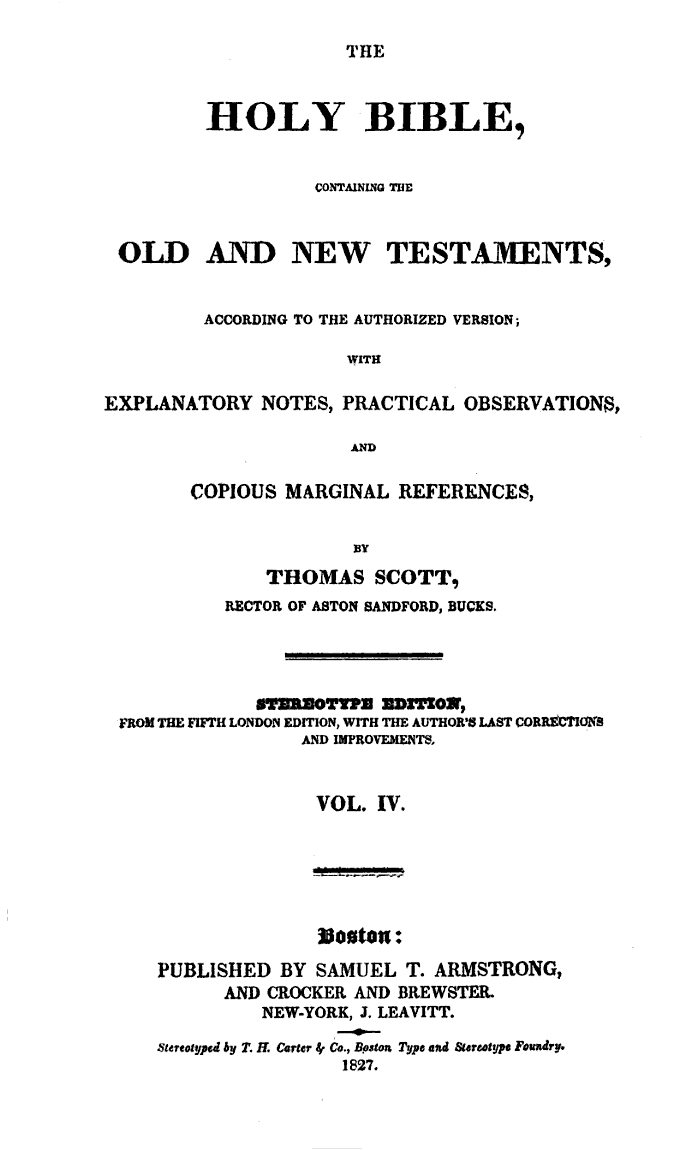
Title page of an 1827 edition of Armstrong's printing of Scott's Bible

Armstrong was involved in civic affairs as early as 1812, when he served in a Boston militia company during the War of 1812. He entered state politics as a representative in Massachusetts General Court (state legislature), serving in that body from 1822 to 1823 and from 1828 to 1829. From 1828 to 1830 he served on Boston's board of aldermen. In 1833 Armstrong was offered the nomination for lieutenant governor by the state Anti-Masonic Party. Since he refused to subscribe to their view that Freemasonry should be abolished, he rejected the offer. He was, however, elected lieutenant governor on the Whig ticket, serving first under Levi Lincoln Jr. and then John Davis. Whig newspapers used his working-class roots to appeal to members of the Working Men's Party, a third party founded on labor issues, describing him in the 1834 campaign as "a Mechanic and Workingman".

When Davis resigned in March 1835 upon his election to the United States Senate, Armstrong served as the Acting Governor until 1836. In the 1836 campaign Armstrong sought the Whig nomination for governor, but it went instead to Edward Everett in a bid for support from the Anti-Masons. Armstrong ended up running that year without party support, and came in a distant third behind Everett and perennial Democratic candidate Marcus Morton.

After his defeat at the state level, Armstrong was elected Mayor of Boston in December 1835. The principal act of civic improvement during his one-year administration was the construction of iron fencing around the Boston Common and the widening of the promenade along Boylston Street. Although the contracts for the work had been drawn up by the preceding administration of Theodore Lyman, Armstrong oversaw the work, and also had the task of securing the relocation of remains in the Central Burying Ground that were affected by the work. This he accomplished, despite some resistance from several families, by offering at no cost several new granite tombs to the affected parties.

In 1839 Armstrong was elected to the Massachusetts Senate, where he served a single term. In 1845 he joined the New England Historical and Genealogical Society, in whose affairs he remained involved until his death. He died in 1850 in Boston, and is buried in Cambridge's Mount Auburn Cemetery. He had married Abigail Walker of Charlestown in 1812; they had no children.

== See also ==
- Timeline of Boston, 1830s

== Notes ==
Political offices
Preceded by Theodore Lyman Jr.	Mayor of Boston, Massachusetts; 1836	Succeeded by Samuel A. Eliot
Preceded by Thomas L. Winthrop	Lieutenant Governor of Massachusetts; January 9, 1834 – January 13, 1836	Succeeded by George Hull
Preceded by John Davis as Governor	Acting Governor of Massachusetts; March 1, 1835 – January 13, 1836	Succeeded by Edward Everett as Governor
