= 1838 New Jersey gubernatorial election =

- October 26, 1838
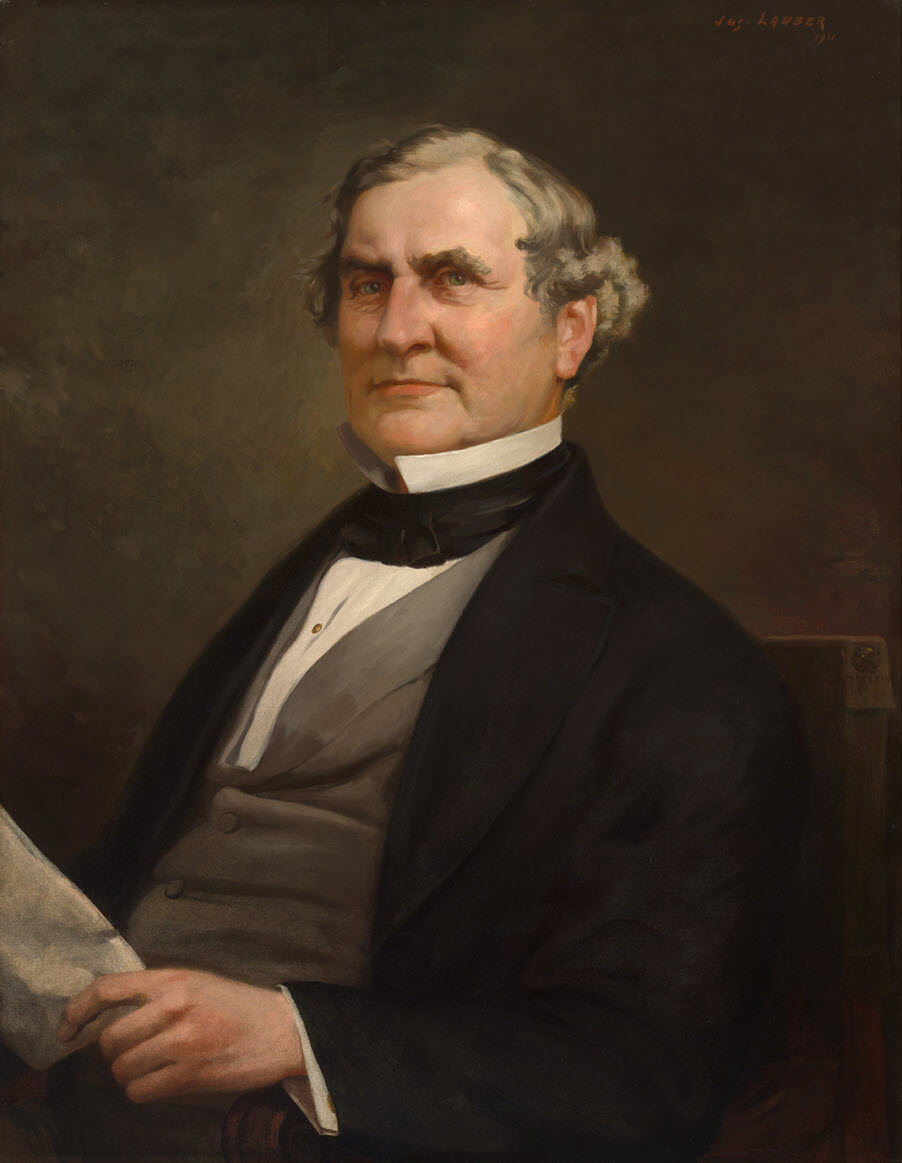
Nominee	William Pennington	James S. Green
Party	Whig	Democratic
Popular vote	38	25
Percentage	60.3%	39.7%
Governor before election
William Pennington
Whig
Elected Governor
William Pennington
Whig

The 1838 New Jersey gubernatorial election was held on October 26, 1838, in order to elect the governor of New Jersey. Incumbent Whig governor William Pennington was re-elected by the New Jersey General Assembly.

== General election ==
On election day, October 26, 1838, incumbent Whig governor William Pennington was re-elected by the New Jersey General Assembly thereby retaining Whig control over the office of governor. Pennington was sworn in for his second term that same day.

=== Results ===
New Jersey gubernatorial election, 1838
Party	Candidate	Votes	%
Whig	William Pennington (incumbent)	38	60.32%
Democratic	James S. Green	25	39.68%
Total votes		63	100.00%
Whig hold			

== Sources ==
- Sobel, Robert (1978). Biographical directory of the governors of the United States, 1789-1978, Vol. III. Meckler Books. ISBN 9780930466008.
