= 1838 Boston mayoral election =

Election in Massachusetts, United States

- December 10, 1838
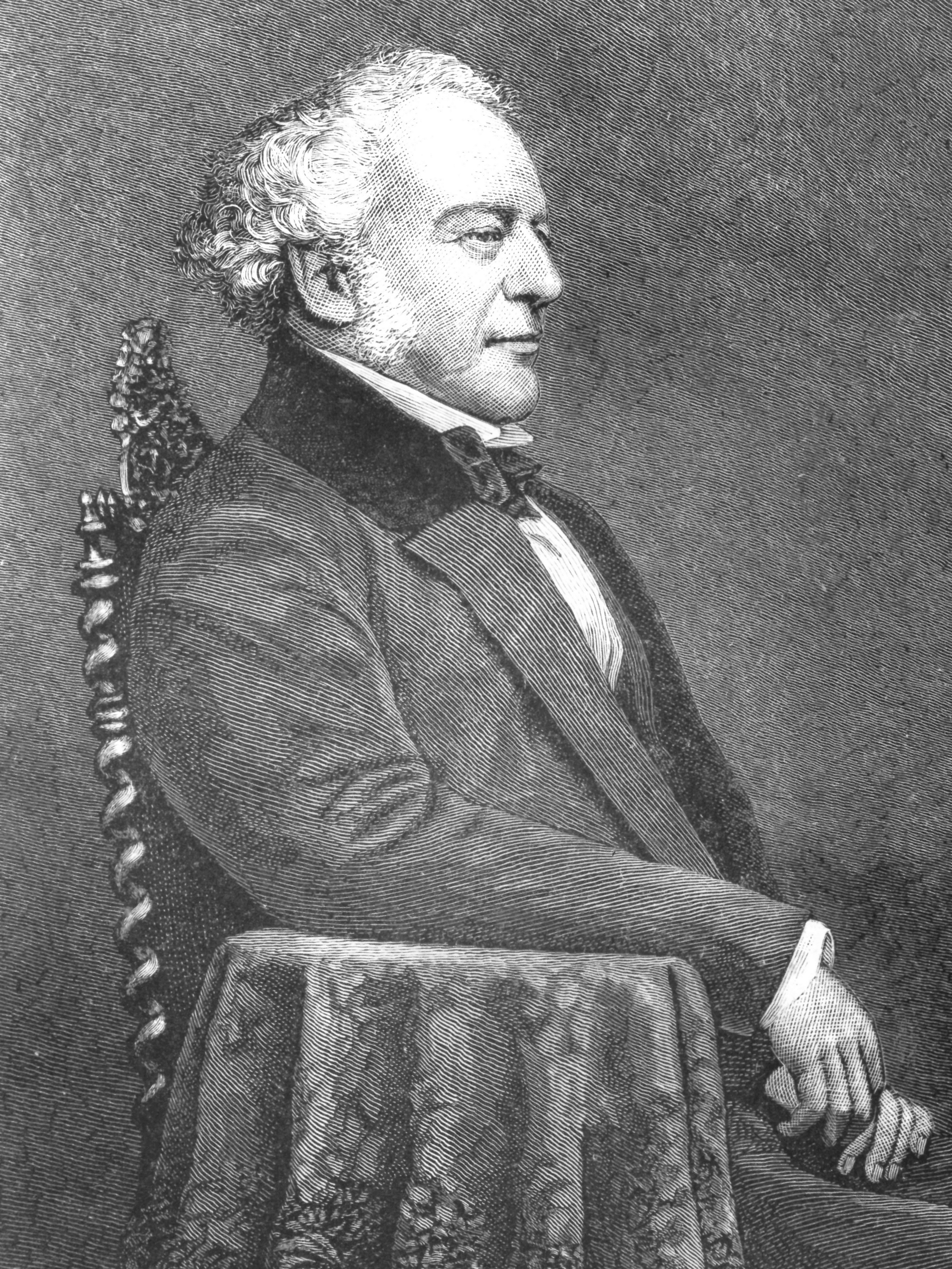

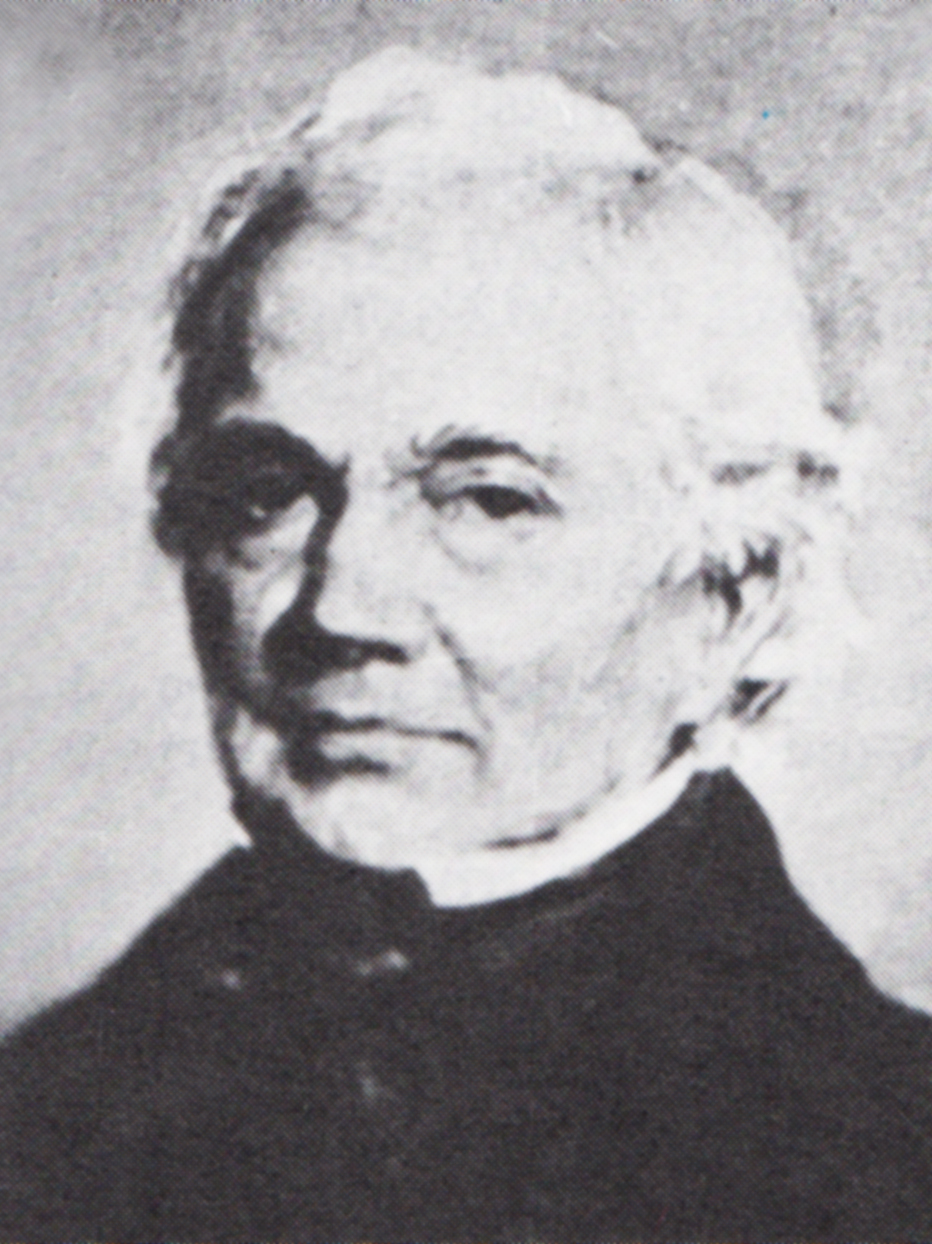
| Candidate | Samuel Atkins Eliot | Caleb Eddy |
| Party | Whig | Democratic |
| Popular vote | 3,766 | 2,341 |
| Percentage | 59.90% | 37.24% |
Mayor before election
Samuel Atkins Eliot
Whig
Elected mayor
Samuel Atkins Eliot
Whig

The 1838 Boston mayoral election saw the reelection of Whig Party incumbent Samuel Atkins Eliot to a third consecutive term. It was held on December 10, 1838.

== Candidates ==
Eliot was the Whig Party nominee. Eddy was the Democratic Party nominee.

== Results ==
1838 Boston mayoral election
| Party | Candidate | Votes | % |
|---|---|---|---|
| Whig | Samuel Atkins Eliot (incumbent) | 3,766 | 59.90 |
| Democratic | Caleb Eddy | 2,341 | 37.24 |
| Scattering | Other | 180 | 2.86 |
| Total votes | | 6,287 | 100 |

== See also ==
- List of mayors of Boston, Massachusetts
