= The Boston Associates =

Former financial services company

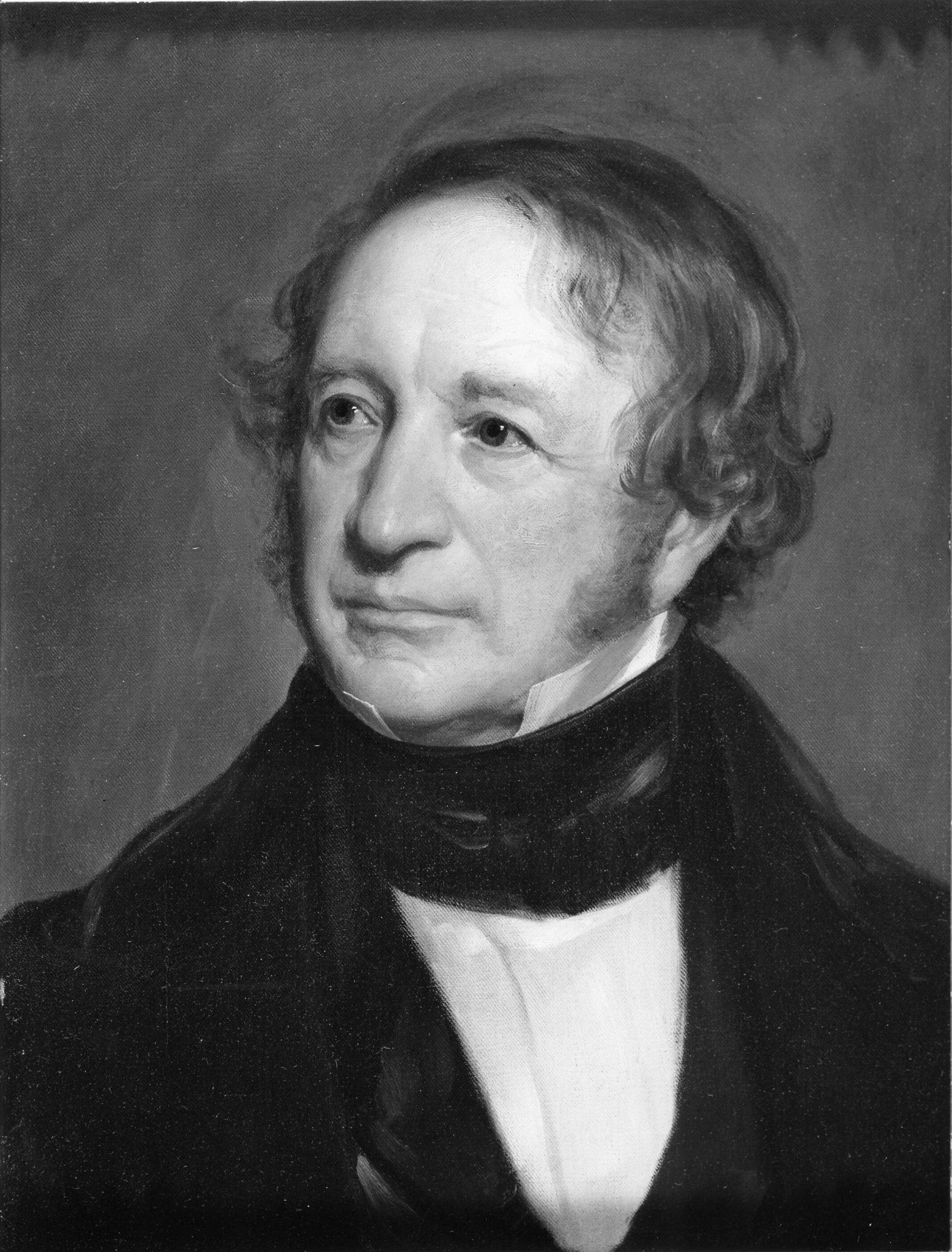
Nathan Appleton

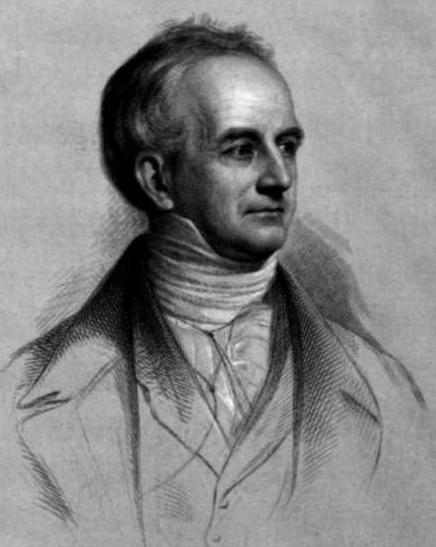
Abbott Lawrence

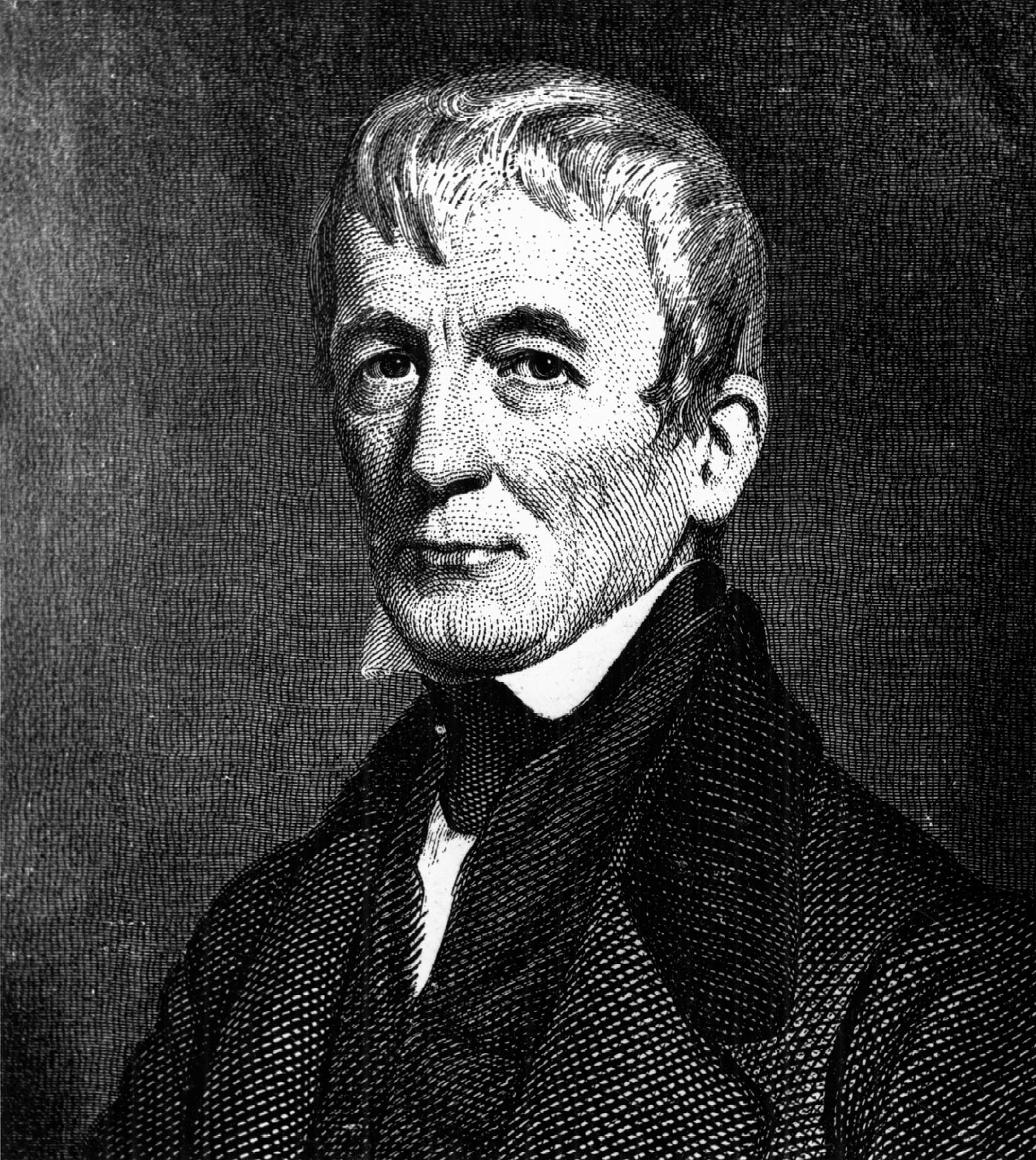
Patrick Tracy Jackson

The Boston Associates is the term historians use for an inter-linked group of investors in 19th-century New England. They included Nathan Appleton, Patrick Tracy Jackson, Abbott Lawrence, and Amos Lawrence. Often related directly or through marriage, they were based in Boston, Massachusetts. The Boston Associates built a vast business empire between 1810 and 1860 that included textile manufacturing, transportation companies, and financial institutions. Their motivation was not just profit, but a desire to maintain their own social standing and secure the status of their children. This drive to preserve class position led them to innovate in business while also reinforcing social hierarchies and class consciousness through large-scale philanthropy. The Boston Associates’ pursuit of social stability and class continuity drove them to create new forms of industrial capitalism, reinforce class structures, and shape the economic and social landscape of 19th-century New England.

== Investments ==
By 1845, 31 textile companies—located in Massachusetts, New Hampshire, and southern Maine—produced one-fifth of all cotton and wool textiles in the United States. With the capital earned through these mills, they invested in railroads, especially the Boston and Lowell. These railroads helped transport the cotton from warehouses to factories. These Boston-based investors established banks—such as the Suffolk Bank—and invested in others. In time, they controlled 40% of banking capital in Boston, 40% of all insurance capital in Massachusetts, and 30% of Massachusetts' railroads. Tens of thousands of New Englanders received employment from these investors, working in any one of the hundreds of their mills.

Mill locations established or improved by the Boston Associates:

- Waltham, Massachusetts (1813)
- Lowell, Massachusetts (1822)
- Manchester, New Hampshire (1825)
- Saco, Maine (1831)
- Nashua, New Hampshire (1836)
- Dover, New Hampshire (1836)
- Chicopee, Massachusetts (1838)
- Lawrence, Massachusetts (1845)
- Holyoke, Massachusetts (1847)

== Ideals and philanthropy ==
Despite being "shrewd, far-sighted entrepreneurs who were quick to embrace...new investment opportunities", the Boston Associates were also "committed to the ideals of the original Protestant ethic and Republican simplicity". Indeed, the members established more than 30 "benevolent societies and institutions" between 1810 and 1840. Their investment in the Boston Manufacturing Company's Lowell Mills project, which Henry Clay called a test for "whether the manufacturing system is compatible with social virtues", epitomized their worldview.

Francis Cabot Lowell was central to this transformation. He learned British textile manufacturing secrets in 1810-1812, then returned to Boston as the War of 1812 cut off trade with England. In 1813 he worked with family and friends to raise $400,000 through sales of shares in his enterprise, the Boston Manufacturing Company. He and introduced the Waltham-Lowell system, which used young women as a disciplined labor force under strict supervision. The Boston Associates took their new profits and copied this model, creating new mill towns across New England and dominating the region’s textile industry. While some historians argued that declining mercantile profits pushed Boston’s merchant capital into manufacturing, historian Robert Dalzell instead contends that manufacturing was not necessarily more profitable than commerce. Instead, the shift was about reducing risk and stress in business, and about finding more predictable, manageable enterprises that could be passed down to heirs without fragmenting family wealth. To ensure their children’s continued elite status, the Boston Associates pioneered the use of corporations and trusts. These legal structures allowed wealth to be divided among heirs without diluting its economic power, and protected it from mismanagement. This gave future generations less direct control over their inheritance. They would be rentiers with a collective interest in maintaining the upper class as a whole. Beyond business, the Associates’ class consolidation extended into philanthropy and politics. Their support for institutions like Massachusetts General Hospital reflected both a sense of community responsibility and an effort to maintain the appearance of social unity, even as class tensions grew worse in Boston.

== List of members ==
Though not authoritative or necessarily complete, Robert Dalzell's 1987 book, Enterprising elite: The Boston Associates and the world they made, enumerated the following businessmen as members of the Boston Associates social strata:

- Nathan Appleton
- William Appleton
- Samuel Batchelder
- Kirk Boott
- John Bromfield Jr.
- Nathaniel Bowditch
- Samuel Cabot
- Edmund Dwight
- Patrick Tracy Jackson
- Abbott Lawrence
- Amos Lawrence
- James Lloyd
- John Amory Lowell
- Francis Cabot Lowell
- George W. Lyman
- Paul Moody
- Daniel Pinckney Parker
- Thomas Handasyd Perkins
- Ignatius Sargent
- David Sears
- Charles Storer Storrow
- Israel Thorndike

== See also ==
- Boston Brahmin
- Boston Manufacturing Company
