= 1838 Ohio gubernatorial election =

- October 9, 1838
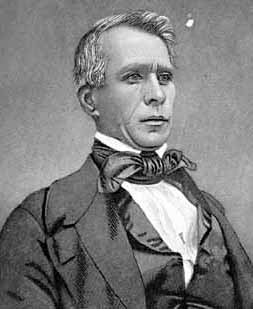

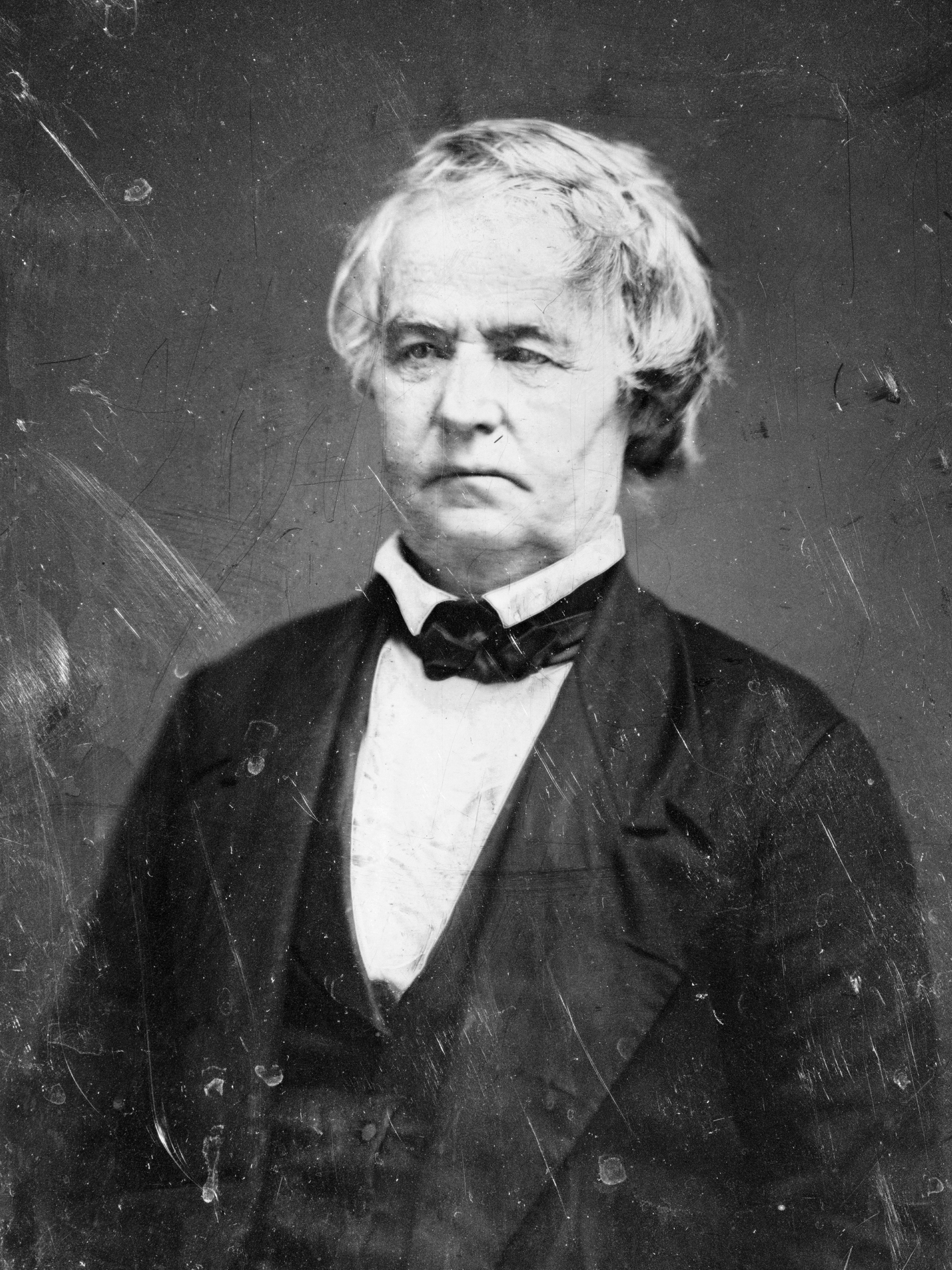
| Nominee | Wilson Shannon | Joseph Vance |
| Party | Democratic | Whig |
| Popular vote | 107,884 | 102,146 |
| Percentage | 51.36% | 48.63% |
- Election results by county Shannon: 50–60% 60–70% 70–80% Vance: 50–60% 60–70% 70–80% No Data/Vote
Governor before election
Joseph Vance
Whig
Elected Governor
Wilson Shannon
Democratic

The 1838 Ohio gubernatorial election was held on October 9, 1838.

Incumbent Whig Governor Joseph Vance was defeated by Democratic nominee, former prosecuting attorney for Belmont County, Wilson Shannon.

== General election ==
=== Results ===
1838 Ohio gubernatorial election
| Party | Candidate | Votes | % | ±% |
|---|---|---|---|---|
| Democratic | Wilson Shannon | 107,884 | 51.36% | |
| Whig | Joseph Vance (incumbent) | 102,146 | 48.63% | |
| Scattering | | 7 | 0.00% | |
| Majority | | 5,738 | 2.73% | |
| Turnout | | 210,037 | | |
| Democratic gain from Whig | | Swing | | |
