= Lyman Estate =

Historic house in Massachusetts, United States

- The Vale
- U.S. National Register of Historic Places
- U.S. National Historic Landmark
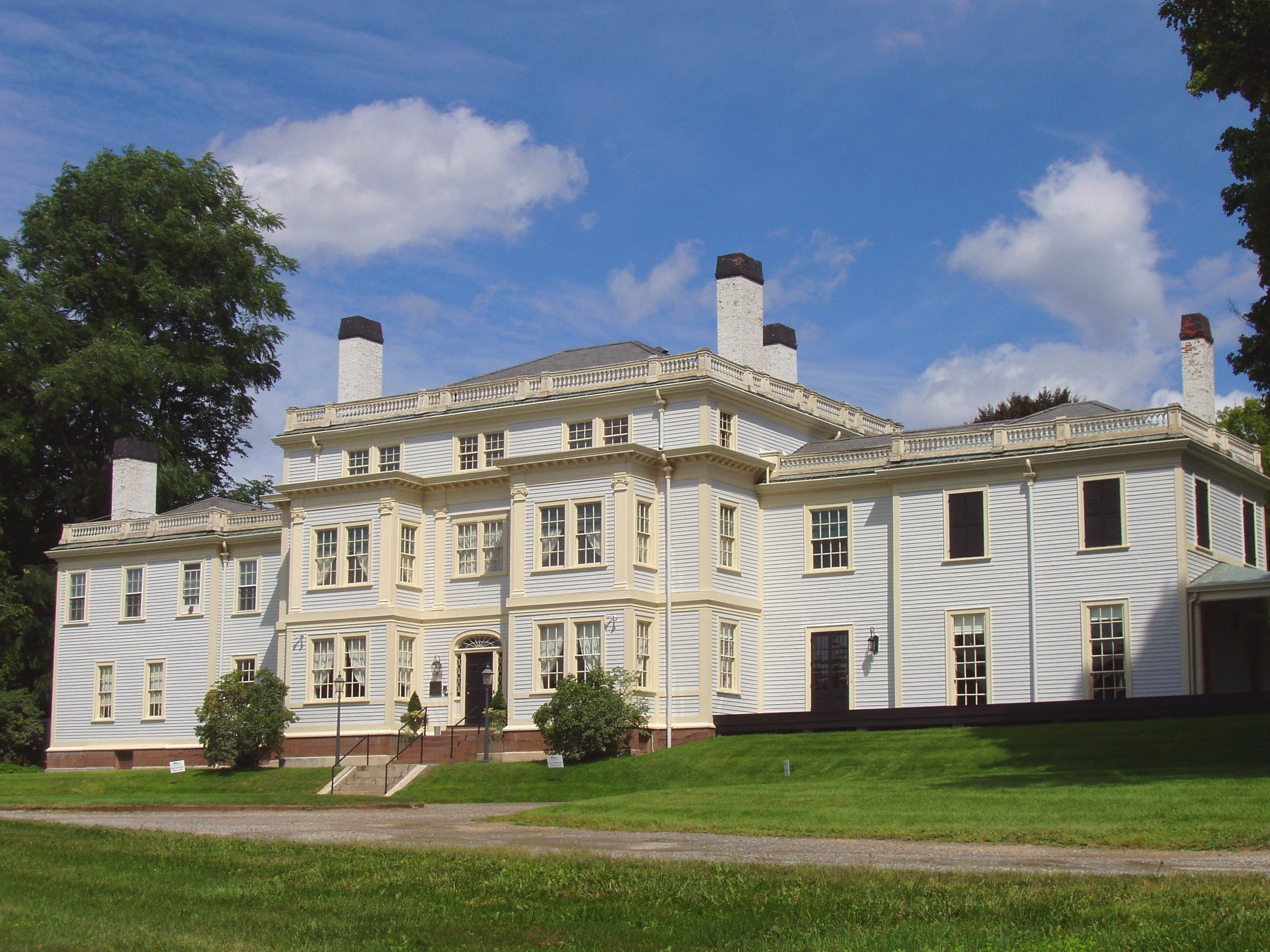
- Front facade of the Lyman Estate.
- Location: 185 Lyman Street, Waltham, MA
- Coordinates: 42°23′0.54″N 71°13′43.64″W
- Area: 37 acres (15 ha)
- Built: begun 1793; completed 1798; altered 1882
- Architect: Samuel McIntire, William Bell
- Architectural style: Colonial Revival, Federal
- NRHP reference No.: 70000737

Significant dates
- Added to NRHP: December 30, 1970
- Designated NHL: December 30, 1970

The Lyman Estate, also known as The Vale, is a historic country house located in Waltham, Massachusetts, United States. It is owned by the nonprofit Historic New England organization. The grounds are open to the public daily for free; an admission fee is required for the house.

== History ==
The estate was established in 1793 by Boston merchant Theodore Lyman I on 400 acres (160 ha) of grounds, and was the Lyman family's summer residence for over 150 years. It consisted originally of the mansion and its lawns, gardens, greenhouses, woodlands, a deer park, and a working farm. Today the grounds contain a number of specimen trees, a 600-foot (180 m) brick wall along which peach and pear trees grow, and late 19th century rhododendrons and azaleas introduced by the Lyman family.

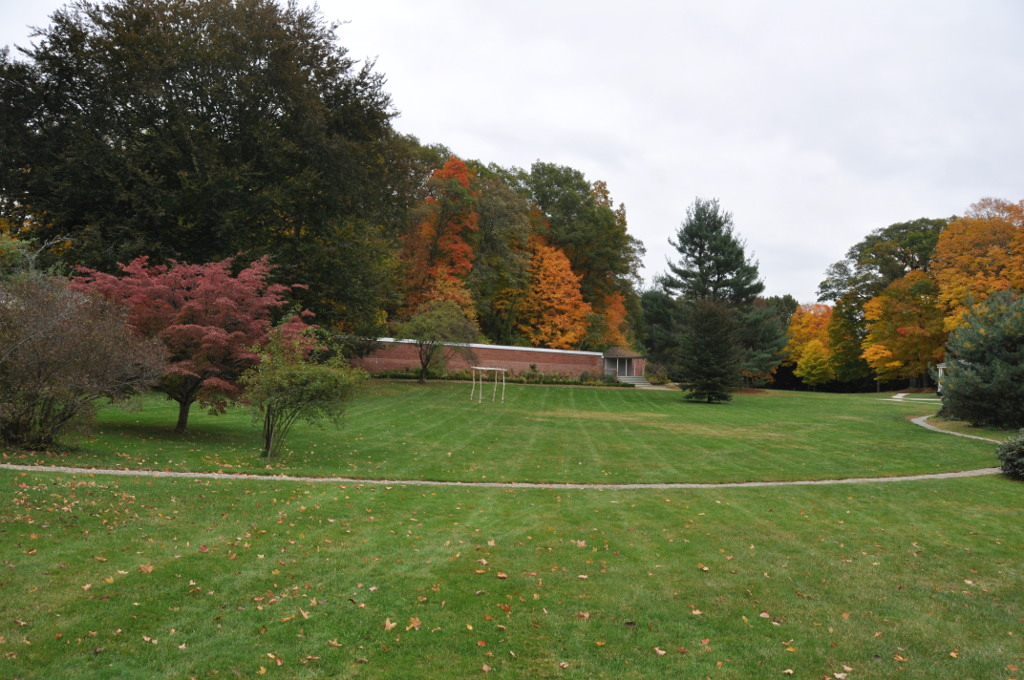
The back lawn and peach wall

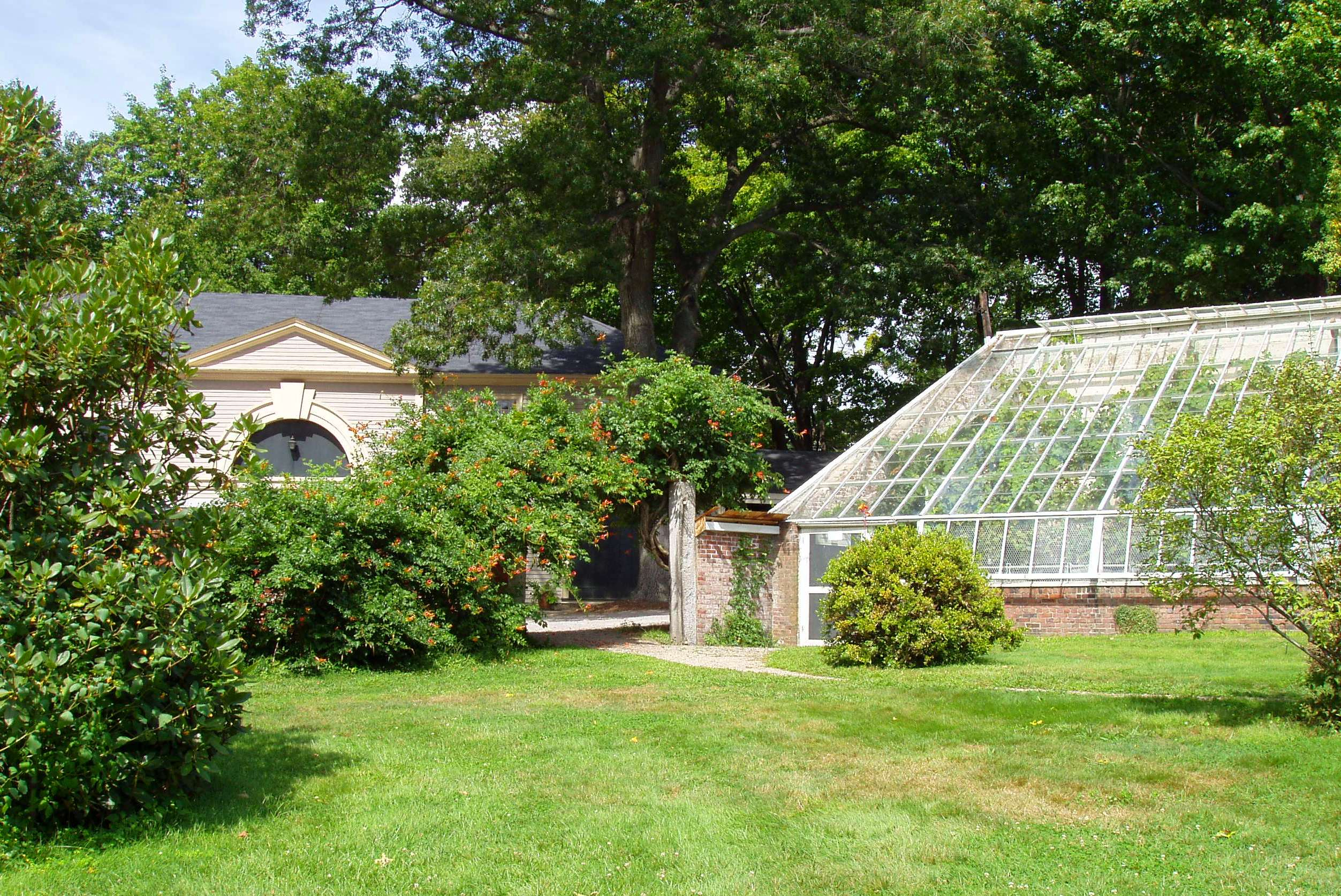
Carriage house and a greenhouse

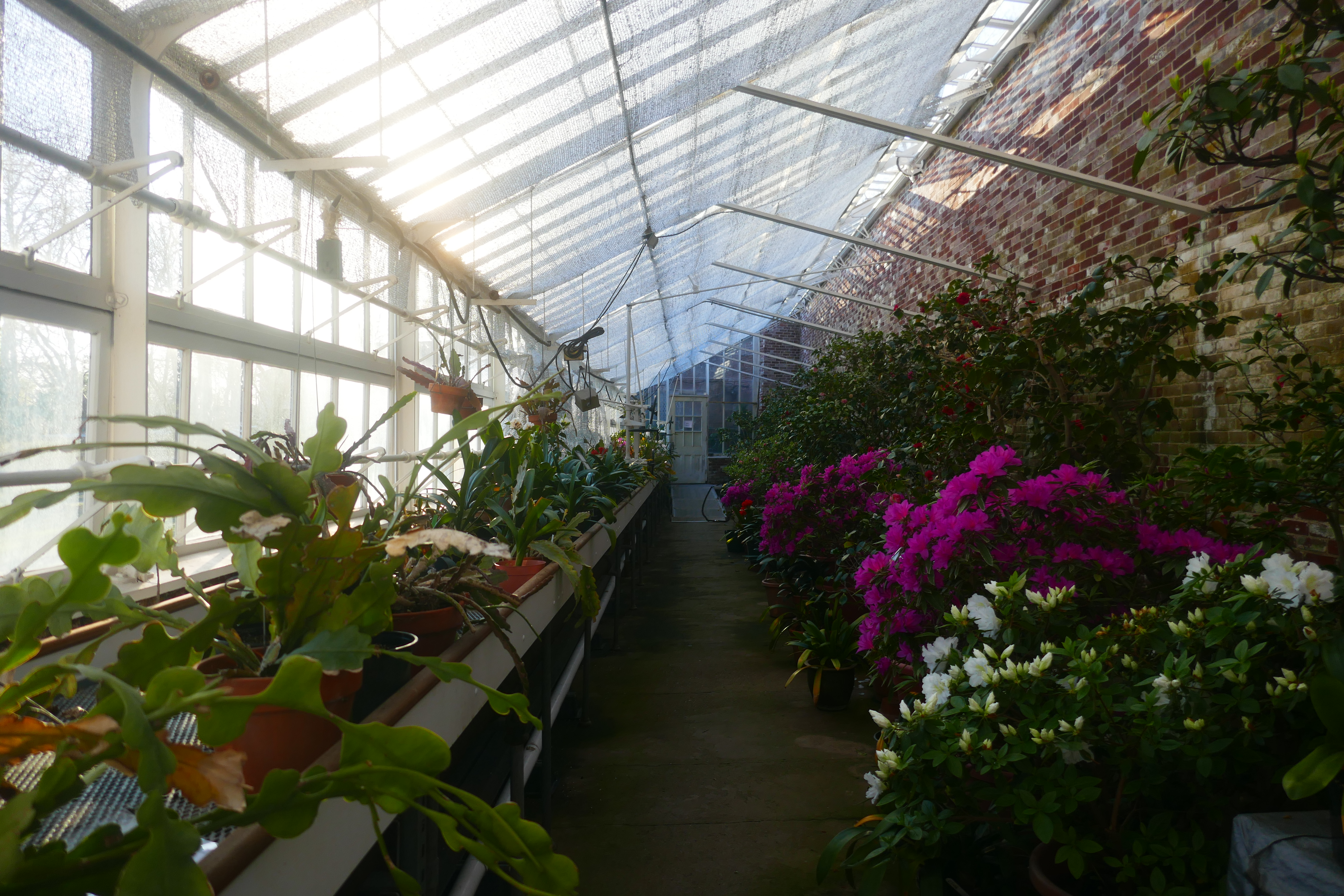
Greenhouse interior

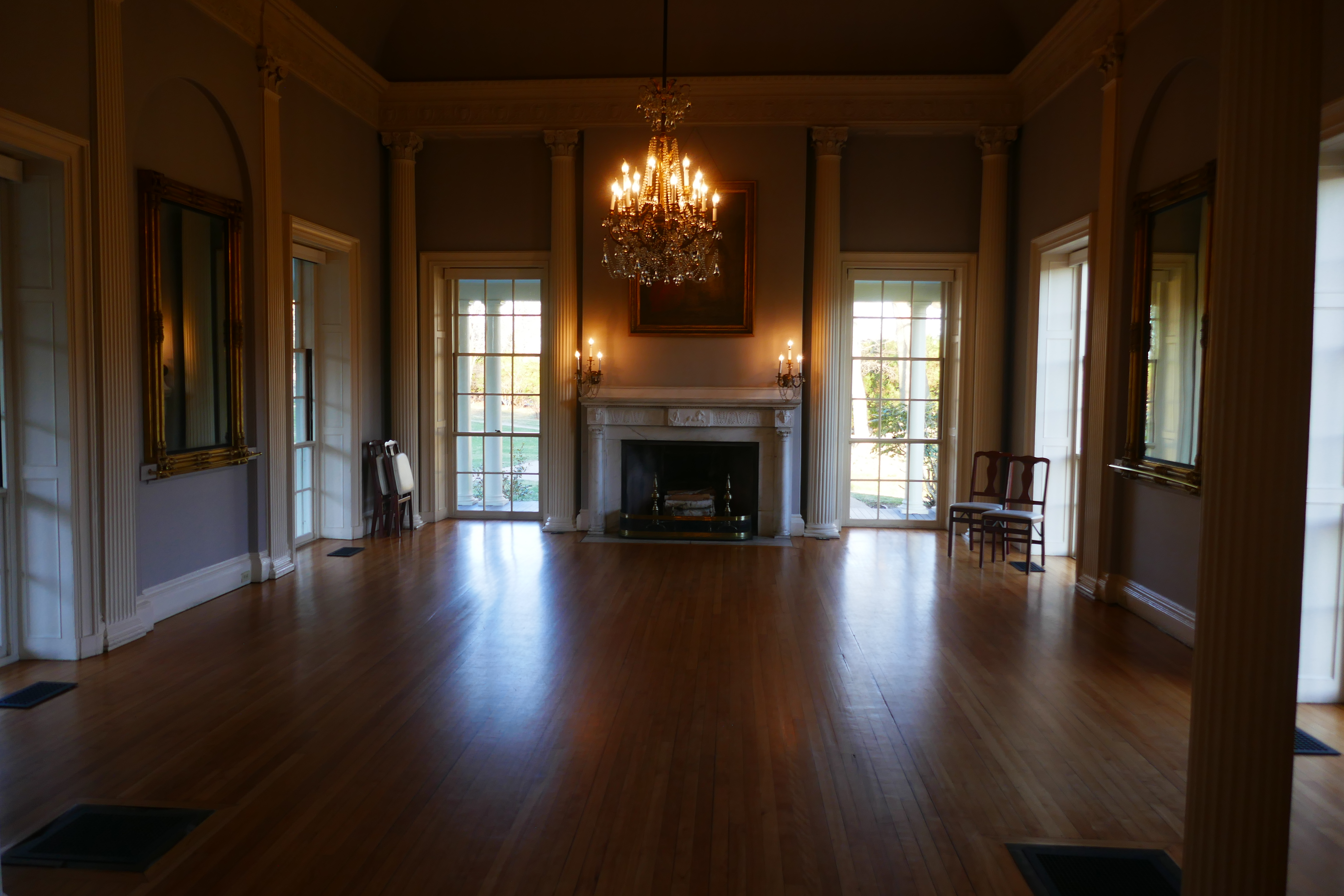
Ballroom

The Federal style mansion, with 24 rooms, was designed by Salem architect Samuel McIntire and completed in 1798. Its grand ballroom, with high ceiling, decorative frieze, large windows, and marble fireplace, was used for formal parties. A smaller oval room was used for family gatherings. McIntire's design was substantially altered during an expansion of the building in 1882 to designs by Richardson, Hartwell and Driver.

The estate's first greenhouse was constructed before 1800 and is thought to be the oldest in the United States. The Grape House, built in 1804 to raise exotic fruits such as oranges, pineapples, and bananas, today houses extensive grape vines, grown from cuttings taken in 1870 from Hampton Court in England. The Camellia House was built around 1820 for cultivation of camellias, introduced to America via Europe in 1797 from coastal China, Japan, and Korea. Many of the Lyman camellias are more than 100 years old. The greenhouses are open to the public.

In the 1960s, the Lyman family, after losing money to a declining textile industry, chose to sell portions of the estate. On October 4, 1962, the property was going to be sold to housing developers, but was instead sold to Bentley University for $365,000. It makes up most of the land that Bentley sits upon.

The estate was designated a National Historic Landmark in 1970 for its architecture and for its landscape design, which is remarkably rare for having retained much of its original 18th-century character.

The estate was one of the filming locations for the 2019 Greta Gerwig film adaptation of Louisa May Alcott's Little Women and the 1979 film adaptation of Henry James's novel The Europeans by Merchant Ivory Productions.

== See also ==
- Gore Place, another former Waltham country estate from the same period
- Robert Treat Paine Estate, a former Lyman family estate just north of this one
- List of National Historic Landmarks in Massachusetts
- National Register of Historic Places listings in Waltham, Massachusetts
