= Dresden, Ontario =

Agricultural community in Ontario, Canada

Dresden
- Community
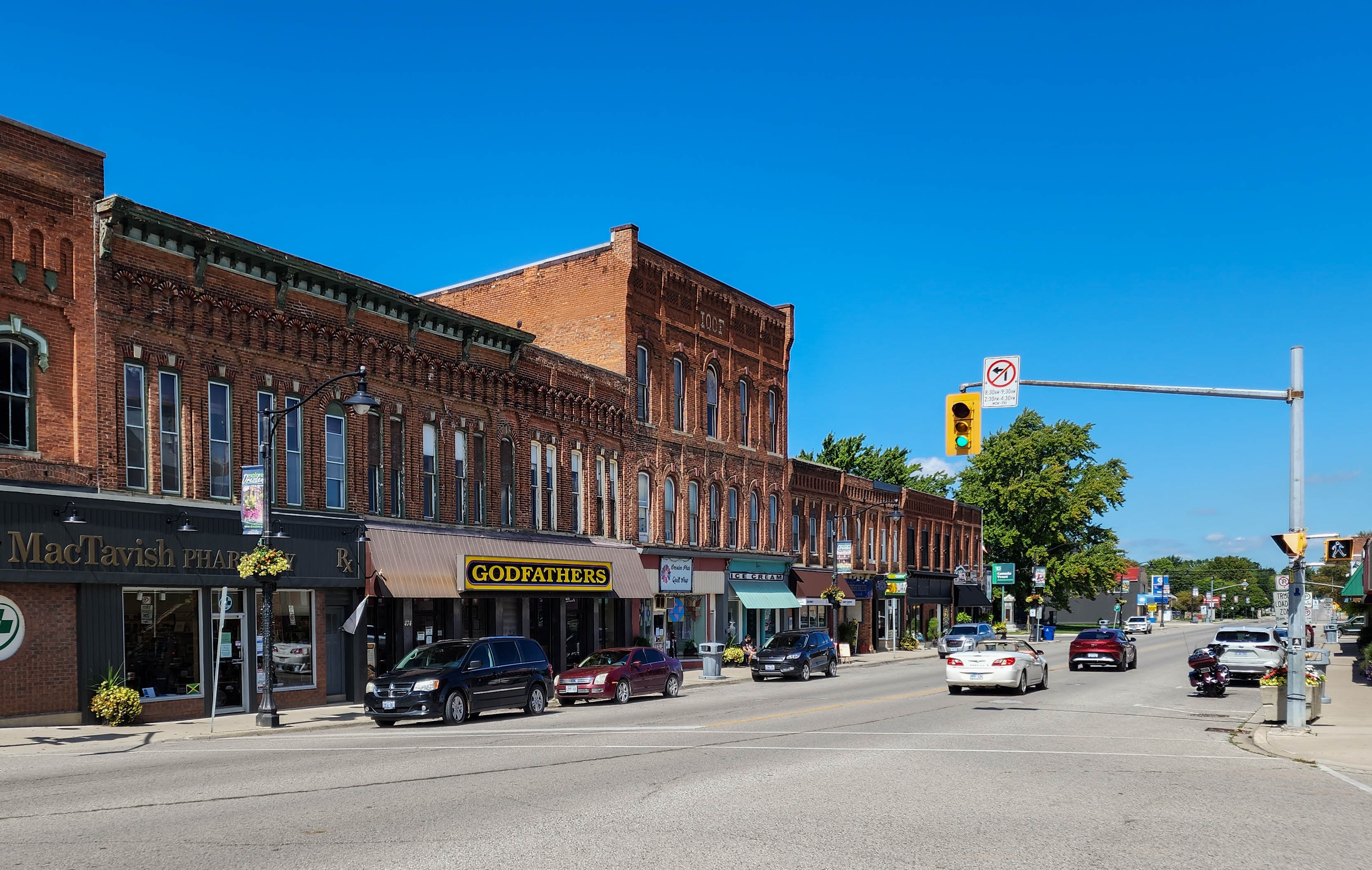
- Main Street, 2024
- Motto: Discover Dresden: The Charm – The Beauty – The Lifestyle
- Location within Municipality of Chatham-Kent Location within Southern Ontario
- Coordinates: 42°35′25″N 82°10′54″W
- Country: Canada
- Province: Ontario
- Municipality: Chatham-Kent
- Federal riding: Chatham-Kent—Leamington
- Provincial riding: Chatham-Kent—Leamington

Population
  - Total: 2,800
- Time zone: UTC−05:00 (EST)
  - Summer (DST): UTC−04:00 (EDT)
- Forward sortation area: N0P 1M0
- Area codes: 519 and 226
- NTS Map: 040J09
- GNBC Code: FAZSG
- Website: dresden.ca

Dresden is an agricultural community in the municipality of Chatham-Kent in southwestern Ontario, Canada. Located on the Sydenham River, it is named after Dresden, Germany. (Note: There are several theories about the origin of the name. According to Beausaert (2024), it may acknowledge a group of Moravian missionaries with German roots; been assigned by a prominent local family descended from a German mercenary soldier; or chosen to maintain a Germanic connection in a region of Canada West that had been known, till 1792, as the District of Hesse.) The main field crops in the area are grain corn, soybean, and winter wheat, and the principal horticultural crops are tomatoes, sweet corn, and carrots.

Dresden was the home of Josiah Henson, an African-Canadian former slave, abolitionist, and minister, whose life-story was an inspiration for the novel Uncle Tom's Cabin. The Henson homestead is a historic building near Dresden.

From 1948 to 1956, Dresden was the focus of a campaign by the National Unity Association, led by Hugh Burnett, for racial equality and social justice. The resultant passage of Ontario's Fair Employment Practices Act (1951) and Fair Accommodation Practices Act (1954) paved the way for the enactment of human rights legislation across Canada. § Human rights: the Dresden story

An H chondrite-type meteorite fell near Dresden in 1939.

== History ==
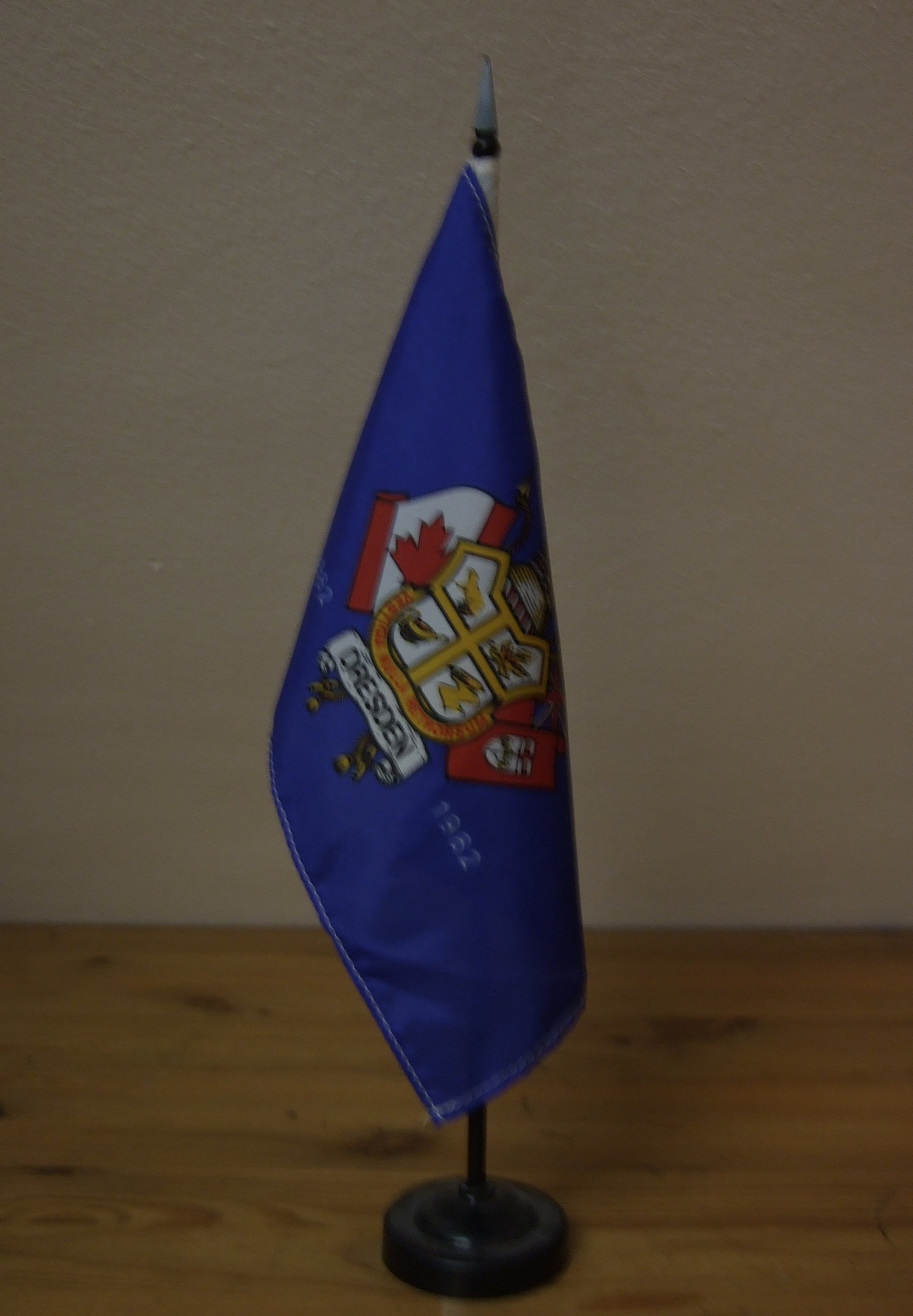
Centennial table flag (1982) with achievement including the motto Vestigia nulla retrorsum

=== Before European settlement ===
Dresden lies within what was, in succession, the province of Quebec (from 1763), Upper Canada (1791), the Canada West division of United Canada (1841), and after Confederation, Ontario (1867).

In the late 18th century, the future site of the community lay in Kent County in the Western District. The region was covered with a largely unbroken, mainly hardwood forest. Deer, bears, wolves, foxes, and wild turkeys roamed in abundance. First Nations peoples used fire in order to make clearings for camps, improve the habitat of game animals, and prepare ground for cultivation. A network of foot and portage trails was well established, often running parallel to or between major waterways and along lake shorelines. Forest cover is estimated to have been over 80%.

==== Treaties ====
In 1790, leaders of the Odawa, Potawatomi, and Chippewa First Nations, (Note: Comprising the Three Fires Confederacy.) together with leaders of the Huron Nations of Detroit, signed a treaty with the British Crown. Known as Treaty No. 2 or the McKee Purchase, it ceded a large tract of land lying between Lake Erie and the Thames River, including the area currently known as Chatham-Kent. (Note: The Lunaapeew also lived in the area. The territory of the Walpole Island (Bkejwanong) First Nation was not ceded (and remains unceded today).) Subsequently, Treaty No. 25, the Longwoods Treaty, was signed in 1822 between leaders of the Chippewa First Nation and the Crown. It confirmed provisional agreements, reached in earlier years, for the Chippewa to cede an area to the north that adjoined much of the upper boundary of the McKee Purchase.

These treaty boundaries have largely not been surveyed. A map produced by Ontario's Ministry of Indigenous Affairs shows present-day Dresden inside the area ceded by the 1790 McKee Purchase, with the northern outskirts close to the area demarcated by the 1822 Longwoods Treaty. Today's community may lie partially in both: Camden Gore, which became part of the site of Dresden, was excluded from the scope of the 1790 treaty, while included in the 1822 one.

Paving the way for settlement, systematic surveys along the Thames and the Sydenham began in the 1790s under Patrick McNiff and Abraham Iredell, who were deputy surveyors, successively, of the Western District.

=== Settlement ===
The first settler recorded on the present-day site of Dresden, in 1825, was Gerard Lindsley, (Note: Jared Lindsley in some records.) who moved there from the Thames River Settlement. In 1846, Daniel VanAllen, (Note: Daniel vanAllen, Vanallan or van Allan in some records.) a Chatham merchant, bought the Lindsley farm and laid out a town plot. Around the same time, William Wright surveyed and settled what became the southern part of Dresden, then known as Fairport.

By 1849, a steam-powered sawmill and a grist-mill in the neighbouring Dawn Settlement were helping drive the economy of a logging-based community slowly expanding on both banks of the head of navigation of the Sydenham River.

=== Underground Railroad ===
The Dawn Settlement was a community composed of refugees from slavery and freedmen and women, and an important end-point of the Underground Railroad's overland and maritime routes. Dawn developed around the British-American Institute, a vocational school whose principal founder, in 1842, was Josiah Henson.

The grounds of the Settlement are now the site of the Josiah Henson Museum of African-Canadian History (formerly Uncle Tom's Cabin Historic Site). The Museum lies just outside modern Dresden's borders at the corner of Park St. and Freedom Road (formerly Uncle Tom's Road).

=== Growth and founding ===
Dresden's post-office opened in 1854, and the first permanent crossing over the Sydenham, a wooden swing-bridge, was erected in 1864. By 1865, Dresden was starting to enlarge, with an estimated population of 500; its principal business was the shipping of squared-up timber, staves, and cordwood. Logs were also driven or rafted downriver to other sawmills. An ashery and a tannery were in operation.

The community's growth in the two decades after 1870 was rapid. In 1872, Dresden was incorporated as a village. The logging, lumber and cordwood industries expanded, supporting woodworking factories producing hubs, spokes, wheels and other components for carriage and wagon manufacturers and shops both local and further afield. The first newspaper, The Gazette, launched in 1870. It was succeeded in 1873 by the long-running Dresden Times. In 1882, Dresden was granted the status of a town, with Alexander Trerice, a lumber merchant, as the first mayor. An impression of the town's layout and locale around this time compared to modern Dresden can be gained from an interactive 1876 map of Kent County.

=== Development ===
In the 1880s, clearing the Sydenham of hardwood logs that had sunk during their driving and rafting, together with improvements to Dresden's turning-basin, gave a boost to the shipbuilding industry and the shipping trade. Shipbuilding, which had started in the early 1870s, saw the construction of a variety of vessels, many steam-driven, for carrying freight and passengers and for pleasure-cruises.

However, railways began to out-compete the Sydenham's schooners, barges, brigs and packet freighters when a spur from the extension of the Erie & Huron Railway from Chatham to Wallaceburg reached Dresden in 1883. A railway was also used to move logs from the northern forest tract to the banks of the Sydenham: from 1884 to 1897, a 36 in (910 mm) narrow-gauge line using Shay locomotives was laid by the Dawn Tramway Company for this purpose. On reaching the river, the logs were boomed and then towed downriver to sawmills. Using the Erie & Huron as a right-of-way for siting poles and wires, telephone service arrived in 1885. The main sewer was laid in 1887. The steady expansion of the town and the farms around created a strong demand for bricks and agricultural drainage tiles, and several manufacturers were in operation from the 1870s onwards.

By 1890, an estimated population of 2,500 inhabited a town with electric street-lighting, brick-built business blocks, a town hall, a fire hall with a steam-powered fire-engine, a division (district) court, several churches, two public schools, a private bank, and two hotels. Industrial establishments included roller mills (replacing earlier grist-mills), sawmills, planing mills, a washing-machine factory, a sorghum syrup factory, a foundry, and a machine shop.

As the forest was clear-cut and thinned, the 1900s saw the waning of logging and lumbering, and a move into other industries. Several involved the processing of the crops, fruit, and vegetables harvested from the farms now rapidly expanding in the region: enterprises included a flax mill, two apple evaporators (to dry and preserve the cored and sliced fruit), and a large, though short-lived, beet sugar factory. A vegetable-canning factory was more successful: it was bought by the upcoming Canadian Canners company. After a succession of owners, in 1947 it was replaced with what eventually became today's Conagra tomato-processing plant. A factory for making an innovative type of stove-damper also prospered. In addition, from the turn of the century, a trend for using concrete blocks instead of stone and brick in foundations and many non-domestic buildings led to their manufacture in Dresden until the 1950s.

Farmers' needs were served by suppliers of agricultural implements, builders' by providers of paint, cement, and hardware, and home comforts were available from, among others, tailors, milliners, dressmakers, an optician and jeweller, suppliers of textiles and ready-to-wear clothing, grocers, a confectioner, and a piano and organ 'emporium'. A 1913 Goad fire insurance map, updated from 1889, details the physical characteristics of the town's buildings, streets and infrastructure, and notes the availability of a steam-propelled fire engine.

Domestically, wood gave way to coal for cooking and heating, with coal supplanted by natural gas from the 1910s on. In 1920, a water tank was erected to maintain pressure in the mains network, which used river water. Pumped well-water was piped from 1943, to be replaced in 1958 by treated water from the Sydenham. St. George and North Streets were paved in 1922, and the sewer network was extended in 1931. When sewage mains were installed throughout the town in the mid-1970s, the two streets were again resurfaced. In 1933, a modern concrete bridge over the Sydenham, in use today, replaced an older iron one.

The 20 acre (c. 8 ha) industrial park, set up in 1964 in the southeast of the town to help diversify Dresden's economy, had a slow start; though by 1975, after an expansion and utilities upgrade in 1974, occupiers included Dresden Produce (a turkey-meat packager), Parking Structural Foam, Canadian Canners, and National Hardware Specialities. The latter, which had moved from Wallaceburg to Dresden in 1951, became Canada's largest producer of zinc die-cast pulleys, and also made sanitary hardware and automotive castings. Employing 120 people at its peak, it closed down in 1991. Greenmelk, another Wallaceburg-based firm, expanded into Dresden in the 1940s, producing animal-feed supplements from alfalfa and other crops, only to close in the early 1960s.

=== Military service ===
No. 6 Company of the 24th Kent Battalion of Infantry, formed in 1866 and first based at Dawn Mills, was stationed in Dresden from 1872. The Battalion disbanded in 1892. Some local men were among the 8000 or so Canadians who fought with or alongside British forces in the South African War.

Around 110 men from Dresden served in World War I, judging by the number of maple leaves (each representing a person) on the service flag made by the local chapter (formed in 1914) of IODE. The Dresden Cenotaph, erected in 1923, records 24 names of those killed in action or who subsequently died of their injuries. For World War II, the Cenotaph records 14 names, and for the Korean War, two.

In 1945, the Chatham-based radio station CFCO began broadcasting a weekly program that featured a regular "Welcome Home" slot for returning servicemen and women, including those from Dresden. Numbers grew as the year wore on. Dresden arranged "welcome home" meetings for returnees from overseas, giving each a gold ring in remembrance of their service. The returned men soon revived the original branch of the veterans' organization the Royal Canadian Legion, and constructed a Legion Hall near the bridge over the Sydenham.

=== Floods ===
Since the late nineteenth century, floods have frequently inundated the part of Dresden lying between a large oxbow meander of the Sydenham. Before the forest in the watershed was cleared, its trees and vegetation had reduced peak water-flows by slowing runoff into the river. Extensive tile-draining of the cleared land also contributed to higher, faster river inflows. Ice-jams in the waterway during spring thaws, exacerbated by log-jams caused by floodwater sweeping stacked logs into the river, made matters worse. A major flood in 1947, when the area alongside the Sydenham was occupied by many of Dresden's larger businesses, was devastating. Another in 1968 was also very destructive.

How to tackle the problem was debated in Dresden and other affected communities for several years, and involved discussions with the Sydenham Valley (later St. Clair Region) Conservation Authority. Options considered included eliminating the oxbow meander, building a dyke, and rezoning flood-prone areas. The approach chosen, the Dresden Floodplain Acquisition Program, is a buy-out scheme, initiated in the 1970s, that aims to reduce flood damage by restricting development in high-risk areas and flood-proofing vulnerable properties.

After several years of landscaping and tree-planting by the Conservation Authority, the first conservation area in the town, along the bank of the Sydenham, opened as a public park in 1979. A further property acquisition and parkland development program, with a 20-year time horizon, started in the early 1980s.

=== Trillium Trail ===
Following the flood of 1968 and the intervention of the Conservation Authority, community organizations (including the Horticultural Society, Rotary, and IODE) worked to enhance Dresden's amenities. The floodplain acquired additional landscaped parks, an arboretum featuring the area's Carolinian forest flora, and in 2003, a 5.8 km Trillium Trail with a historical walk section. The trailhead and interpretive centre are on St. George Street, near the bridge over the Sydenham. The historical walk has plaques describing over 50 sites connected to people and industries that shaped the town. In addition, a variety of commemorative barn quilts are displayed around Dresden, forming part of a barn quilt trail covering sites in Oil Springs, Tupperville, Shetland, Croton and Bothwell.

As well as Josiah Henson, other prominent figures linked to the Underground Railroad once called Dresden home. Research carried out when preparing the Trillium Trail's historical walk (in conjunction with the Promised Land Project) revealed that from 1853 to 1873, large sections of the town's original site were owned by William Whipper, a successful African-American businessman and leading member of William Still's Underground Railroad network. Several houses from this period survive. Various plaques around the town, installed by the Ontario Heritage Trust, commemorate important events in the community's history. In 2022, the Trust produced a series of short documentaries about Dresden and the Dawn Settlement.

The North Star: Finding Black Mecca, an award-winning indie film about the history of Chatham-Kent's Black communities, including Dresden's, was broadcast in September 2021 by CBC/Radio-Canada.

=== Celebrations and commemorations ===
The first recorded Old Boys' Reunion took place in 1902, when several hundred former residents attended, followed by ones in 1904 and 1928. In 1954, Dresden celebrated and commemorated the centennial of establishing its post office; in 1982, the centennial of its incorporation as a town; in 1967, the Confederation Centennial; and in 1997, 125 years since it formally became a village. Annual, three-day "Civic Fests" in the late 1970s and early 1980s raised funds for repairing and maintaining what is now the Ken Houston Memorial Agricultural Centre. In 1998, when Dresden became part of the new municipality of Chatham-Kent, it lost its town status. In 2007, Dresden marked 125 years since it became a town. The founding of Dresden is commemorated by a plaque.

=== Landmarks ===
Many of Dresden's landmark buildings are regarded as cultural heritage assets, and are legally protected to ensure their conservation.

==== Designated properties ====
Six have been entered in the official heritage register as designated properties, which means they can neither be altered nor demolished:

- Dresden Library, housed at 187 Brown Street in an original Carnegie library building constructed in 1913 and refurbished in 2000;
- Switzer house at 220 Hughes Street, built ca. 1905;
- Watson house, 480 Hughes Street, ca. 1870;
- McVean house, 788 North Street, ca. 1901;
- Dresden Creamery Building, 303 St. George Street, ca. 1880;
- Dresden Municipal Centre, 485 St. George Street, ca. 1912.

==== Listed properties ====
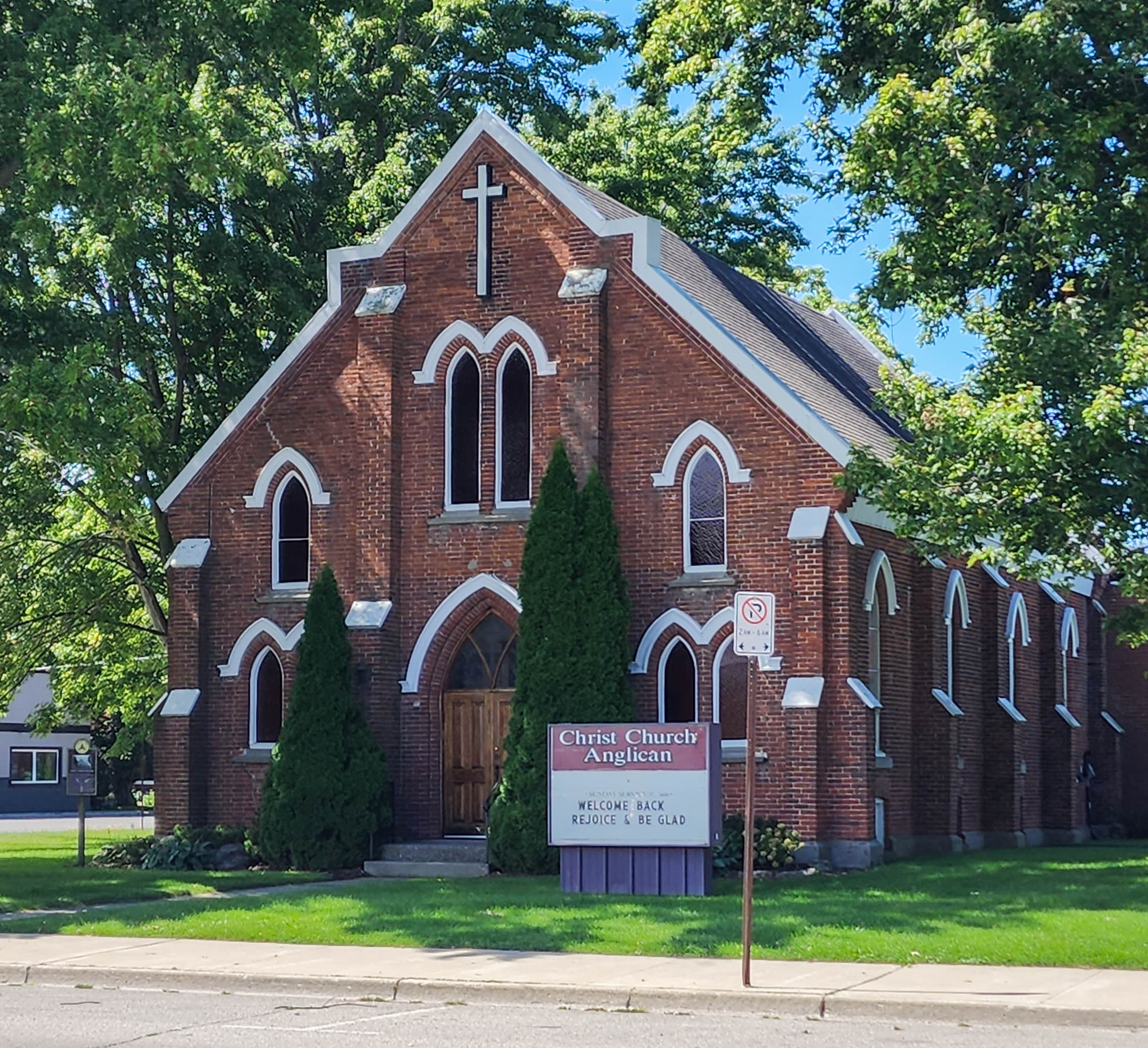
Christ Church Anglican

Another 18 buildings are registered as listed properties. The owner of such a property cannot alter or demolish it without first giving the municipality the opportunity to designate it. (Note: Owners of listed buildings must give 60 days' notice of their intentions.) Dresden's listed properties include several houses on Hughes Street and Metcalfe Avenue; St. James Presbyterian Church and Christ Church Anglican; and the entirety of the main commercial block on St. George Street.

==== Further landmarks ====
Further landmarks include several churches – St. Andrew's Presbyterian Church, St. Michael's Church, Dresden Community Church, the Christian Reformed Church, the First Regular Baptist Church (the oldest in Dresden), and the North Dresden Baptist Church; the Dresden Cenotaph, and the war memorial and memorial field in Dresden Cemetery; Dresden Raceway; the Ken Houston Memorial Agricultural Centre; Dresden Bridge over the Sydenham River; the Dresden Water Tower; the Rotary Bandshell in Dresden Rotary Memorial Gardens; and, just outside Dresden, the Josiah Henson House (a designated property) in the grounds of the Josiah Henson Museum of African-Canadian History.

== Transport links ==
=== Roads and trails ===
When travelling west on Highway 401 from the direction of Toronto, Dresden is a 29 km drive from Exit 109 along County Road (CR) 21 via Thamesville. Travelling east from the direction of Detroit and taking Exit 101, Dresden is 25 km away on CR 15, with a short leg on CR 21. From Dresden, CR 21 continues northwards (as North Street and then St. George Street) and on into Lambton County, linking Oil Springs, Petrolia, and Wyoming. It eventually intersects King's Highway 402, which runs westwards to the Canada–USA border at Blue Water Bridge, and eastwards to London to meet King's Highway 401.

CR 15, skirting Dresden to the south, links the community to Wallaceburg in the west, and runs southeast, via Kent Bridge, to Rondeau Provincial Park on the shores of Lake Erie. CR 78 provides a connection to Wallaceburg from the northern end of Dresden. From Thamesville (reached via CR 21 from Dresden), CR 2 runs southwest to Chatham and northeast to London. Further numbered roads provide links to other population centres in Chatham-Kent and adjacent counties.

Public transit is provided by the municipality's Ride CK service. Route A connects Dresden to Wallaceburg and Chatham. Several private companies have started operating long-distance intercity coach services since Greyhound withdrew from Canada in 2021.

The multi-use Trans-Canada Trail, also known as the Great Trail, skirts the southwestern edge of Dresden and connects to the Great Lakes Waterfront Trail at Clearville in the southeast of Chatham-Kent and, in the northwest, to the St. Clair River Trail at Whitebread. Within Dresden, the Trillium Trail provides a natural-surface and off-road connection between downtown and the Josiah Henson Museum of African-Canadian History. Dresden is also part of the Underground Railroad Bicycle Route, with a spur taking in Windsor, North Buxton, Chatham, and Dresden, and of a barn quilt trail, "Into the Dawn".

=== Planes and trains ===
Detroit Metropolitan Airport, often referred to as DTW, is the nearest major international airport to Dresden. There are many smaller airports in Chatham-Kent and adjacent counties.

The nearest railway station to Dresden is Chatham train station. It is served by Via Rail services running between Toronto and Windsor.

== Local government and services ==
Local government is provided by the Municipality of Chatham-Kent. Its responsibilities include the provision, management or oversight of water treatment, parks, libraries, garbage collection, public transit, land-use planning, traffic signs and lights, police, paramedics, fire services, sewers, homeless shelters, childcare, and recreation centres.

The Municipality's governing council has 18 members: the mayor, elected municipality-wide, and 17 councillors, elected across six municipal wards. Dresden is within the ward of North Kent (Ward 4), which has two councillors. At the last election, in 2022, Jamie McGrail and Rhonda Jubenville were elected to represent North Kent for a four-year term (2022-2026).

In Dresden, the Municipal Service Centre at 485 St. George Street provides access to all municipal services and also to services provided by the provincial government of Ontario, such as driver's licences and licence plates, Ontario Photo Cards, (Note: A card providing government-issued identification to Ontarians who do not have a driver's licence) health cards, birth certificates, and other essential documents. Ontario's responsibilities include health, education, river and road vehicle licensing, energy, human rights, natural resources, the environment, and social services.

== Schools and libraries ==
An elementary school, Dresden Area Central School, and a secondary school, Lambton-Kent Composite (Note: In Canada, a secondary school offering both academic and vocational subjects and courses.) School, serve Dresden and nearby communities. The Dawn-Euphemia Elementary School lies near Dresden. The Lambton-Kent District School Board is responsible for public education in Dresden and its municipality, Chatham-Kent. The Dresden Private Mennonite School serves the Mennonite community.

The Dresden Sidestreets Youth Centre offers afterschool activities for ages 11 to 17, including a homework programme, games and karaoke, and involvement in community activities, such as clean-up days.

The Dresden Library, a branch of the Chatham-Kent Public Library, offers a collection of books, magazines, movies, music, eBooks, audiobooks, microfilm, microfiche, and local history resources, together with services such as a book club, story-time sessions, and access to settlement services for newcomers. It occupies the original Carnegie library building on Brown Street.

== Healthcare ==
The Dresden Community Healthcare Centre provides primary care. It is staffed by a medical team that includes family doctors, nurse practitioners, and nurses. The Centre provides access to dietitians, social workers, pharmacists, occupational therapists, and foot-care specialists, and offers a diabetes management programme for adults with type 1 or type 2 diabetes. The nearest hospital to Dresden is in Wallaceburg. It provides basic hospital and healthcare services, and has emergency rooms and a 5-bed in-patient unit.

The MacTavish Pharmacy serves Dresden and the surrounding area. In Ontario, pharmacists are authorized to prescribe medications for 19 minor ailments.

In Chatham-Kent, Dresden's municipality, in-home and community-based care is coordinated by the Erie St. Clair branch of Ontario's Home and Community Care Support Services organization. (Note: Formerly known as the Erie St. Clair LHIN (Local Health Integration Network), and still appearing as such in some web pages and publications.) Through its portal, it provides access and referrals to other community services. It also manages placements in Ontario's care-homes, and works together with primary care providers, hospitals, Ontario Health Teams, and other healthcare services.

The College of Physicians and Surgeons of Ontario (CPSO) maintains a list of registered doctors, and the Royal College of Dental Surgeons of Ontario (RCDSO) a list of registered dentists.

== Events, Sports and Dresden Fair ==
=== Events ===
Regular events include a "Show & Shine" for classic cars, and weekly concerts in the summer in the Rotary Memorial Gardens. In the spring, in a ceremony organised by the Dresden & District Horticultural Society, memorial and tribute trees are planted in parkland to commemorate the lives of people from Dresden and the surrounding area. Each year, a Terry Fox Run takes place on the second Sunday after Labour Day, and 1 August, Emancipation Day, is celebrated. Inductions into the Dresden Sports Hall of Fame are made every two years in a ceremony at the Ken Houston Memorial Agricultural Centre. A Guest Worker Appreciation Day, welcoming Jamaican and other seasonal workers for the tomato-canning season, was held for the first time in August 2023. In early fall, an "Art in the Park" arts-and-crafts show takes place in the Tony Stranak Conservation Area.

Black History Month, a time for reflection and an opportunity to celebrate the contributions and achievements of Black Canadians, takes place in February, with events and programs in Dresden's schools and at the Josiah Henson Museum of African-Canadian History. The National Day for Truth and Reconciliation, colloquially known by its original name of Orange Shirt Day, is observed on 30 September. It recognises the impact and legacy of the Indian residential school system on First Nations, Inuit and Métis peoples. Remembrance Day is observed on 11 November: it commemorates the war dead, military veterans, and those who continue to serve Canada during times of war, conflict, and peace.

Towards Christmas, there is a "Christmas House" tour, the ceremonial illumination of a "Tree of Tribute" to honour loved ones, and a Christmas night market. A night market is also held in the summer, and shops, entertainment venues and cultural amenities open late, year-round, on "Merry & Bright Thursday Nights".

=== Sports ===
Dresden has several sports fields, a skateboard park, a lawn bowling green, and a community swimming pool. The Ken Houston Memorial Agricultural Centre is the home arena of the Dresden Jr. Kings junior ice hockey team.

Harness races are held at the Dresden Raceway in the warmer months. The Raceway has a half-mile (800 m) oval track with a grandstand, and offers a range of betting and dining options. The track is also used to train pacer and trotter horses, and for occasional demolition derbies and truck and tractor pulls.

=== Dresden Fair ===
The Dresden Fair, with an exhibition, a cattle show, and a midway, takes place over three successive days towards the end of July each year. It has been held, in one form or another, since 1875.

== Industry and business ==
Dresden has many small and a few medium-sized businesses, ranging from gas stations to restaurants, specialty retail stores and service providers. The community maintains a directory of businesses, churches and local organizations.

Since 1947, Dresden has hosted ConAgra Foods' tomato processing plant, a major local employer. In September 2023, the parent company announced a significant upgrade and expansion of the facility. Other small-to-medium-sized firms in Dresden include Martinrea Metallic Canada Inc., part of Martinrea International, an auto parts manufacturer; Richkote Metal Finishing Inc.; Waste Wood Disposal Ltd.; and MPT Inc., a provider of automated manufacturing systems.

== Media ==
The community publishes a weekly newsletter, WhatsUpDresden! Many of Dresden's community organizations have a presence on social media, notably Facebook.

Several local and regional newspapers and national news outlets typically cover events in Dresden:

- CBC News (and radio)
- Chatham Daily News
- Chatham-Kent This Week
- Chatham Voice
- CK News Today
- Global News Canada
- London Free Press
- Sydenham Current
- The Herald
- Wallaceburg Courier Press

The trade press, such as The Grower and Tomato News, cover agribusiness.

Several weekly newspapers used to be published in Dresden: The Gazette, Dresden Times, Dresden News, North-Kent Leader, and Dresden Leader-Spirit. Chatham-Kent Public Library maintains a comprehensive (though incomplete) archive that can be consulted at the Dresden Library branch.

A number of radio stations broadcast or stream from Chatham-Kent.

== Human rights: the Dresden story ==
After military service in World War II, Hugh Burnett returned to his home town of Dresden to set up a carpentry business. He found that because he was Black, some restaurants refused to serve him. In 1948, he and other African-Canadians founded the National Unity Association (NUA) to campaign to make such discrimination illegal. Among their first acts was the circulation of a petition to 118 business owners and local politicians asking for support to end the practice in Dresden. 115 signed in favour. After sustained lobbying by the NUA, the town then held a referendum in December 1949 that asked: "Do you approve of the council passing a bylaw licensing restaurants in Dresden and restraining the owner or owners from refusing service regardless of race, colour or creed?" Out of 1250 eligible voters, 625 voted. However, only 108 votes were cast in favour, with 517 against – the approximate ratio of Black to non-Black residents of Dresden.

This outcome galvanized support for an anti-discrimination law to be adopted at provincial level. The campaign culminated in March 1954, when Burnett was part of a large delegation of labour, church and civil society organizations that presented the case for legislation directly to Ontario Premier Leslie Frost and his cabinet. Soon after, the Ontario Fair Accommodation Practices Act was passed, and came into effect in June that year. It stated that: "No person shall deny to any person or class of persons the accommodation, services or facilities available in any place to which the public is customarily admitted because of the race, creed, colour, nationality, ancestry or place of origin of such person or class of persons."

However, some restaurants and barbers still refused to serve African-Canadians. Justice William Schwenger investigated the complaints as a one-man commission. On the basis of his recommendations, Charles Daley, the minister of labour, declined to prosecute two Dresden restaurant owners who had refused to serve Black people. Daley said "I understand these people will in future obey the law, although I have not spoken directly to them".

To test this assertion, Hugh Burnett, Bromley Armstrong and Ruth Lor Malloy, together with a reporter, went to Kay's Café, Morley McKay's restaurant, on 29 October 1954. They were denied service. McKay was the first person to be charged under the Act. A few months after the conclusion of a long legal battle, McKay made his restaurant open to everyone.

In 1954, the conflicting attitudes of Black and non-Black Dresden residents towards the issue were recorded in The Dresden Story, a 30-minute National Film Board (NFB) documentary. In 2000, the NFB released the 47-minute documentary Journey to Justice, an examination of the fight for Black civil rights from the 1930s to the 1950s that places The Dresden Story in historical context. Among others, it features Bromley Armstrong and Ruth Lor Malloy, who were also the subject of a 2014 CBC News report showing them revisiting Dresden 60 years on. To Serve: Hugh Burnett: Shaping civil rights in Canada, a 23-minute CBC Radio documentary about the Dresden story, aired in July 2013.

On 31 July 2010, a bilingual plaque to honour Hugh Burnett and the National Unity Association was unveiled in Dresden. The English version reads:

Hugh Burnett and the National Unity Association

Between 1948 and 1956, the National Unity Association (NUA) of Chatham, Dresden and North Buxton, under the leadership of Hugh R. Burnett, waged a campaign for racial equality and social justice. Their efforts led to the passage of Ontario's Fair Employment Practices Act (1951) and Fair Accommodation Practices Act (1954), and laid the groundwork for subsequent human rights legislation in Ontario and across Canada. Traditional Anglo-Canadian rights, such as freedom of association and freedom of commerce, had historically been interpreted to permit discrimination on grounds of race, colour or creed in providing services to the public. The NUA inspired recognition of freedom from discrimination as a fundamental principle; this led to a revolutionary change to the course of Canadian law and Canadian history. Hugh Burnett and the NUA were early pioneers in the articulation of equality rights for all Canadians, now constitutionally inscribed in the Charter of Rights and Freedoms.

In 1949, Dresden was about 17% Black. The proportion of Black residents dropped to 11% in 2001, and reached a historic low of 5.5% in 2016.

== Dresden in literature ==
=== Travelogue, memoir, autobiography ===
- In the first chapter of her memoir Brightening My Corner (2023), the journalist, writer and activist Ruth Lor Malloy relates how, in 1954, she took part in the sit-ins in Dresden restaurants that refused to serve Blacks.
- Dick Wright's memoir, Dresden Life Remembered (2009), describes the town he grew up in during the 1940s and early 1950s.
- In Welcome Home: Travels in Smalltown Canada, first published in 1992, the radio broadcaster and author Stuart McLean shared his experiences of Dresden and several other small Canadian towns. The Dresden chapter describes encounters with, among others, pharmacists, barbers, factory workers, shopkeepers, teachers, doctors, farmers, tomato processors, accountants, the chief of police, and the mayor. Welcome Home won the 1993 Canadian Authors Association Award for Best Non-Fiction Book, and was widely acclaimed.
- The later version of Josiah Henson's autobiography (1876) recounts his experiences at the Dawn Settlement, then adjacent to Dresden, including the erection of a sawmill, lumbering operations, and the establishment of the British-American Institute.
- Parker Theophilus Smith, carpenter, pharmacist and one-time president of the Banneker Institute in Philadelphia, lived with his family in Dresden in 1861/62. He helped build a house for Josiah Henson and establish a literary and debating society. He described his experiences in letters published in the Christian Recorder and collected in the Black Abolitionist Papers.
- Rev. Lewis Champion Chambers, a freedman, was engaged by the American Missionary Association (AMA) in 1858 to minister to small groups of rural Blacks in the hinterland of Dresden, where he farmed. His letters to AMA's secretary record the people to whom he ministered, the services and meetings he held, the prejudices he encountered, and the conditions faced by Black newcomers to Canada West.
- Rev. Thomas Hughes, who moved to Dresden in 1859 to establish a school and church (now Christ Church Anglican), wrote a letter each year to his employer, the Colonial Church and School Society (CCSS). The letters were published in the CCSS's annual reports. He also kept a diary of his doings and reflections from 1861 to 1873.
- In the 1850s, the American abolitionist and author Benjamin Drew [de] travelled throughout Canada West interviewing former slaves. His A North-side View of Slavery (1856) has a chapter on Dresden and the neighbouring Dawn Settlement that contains first-hand testimonies by Black residents.

=== Biography ===
- The Commemorative Biographical Record of the County of Kent (1904) declares, in its preface, that "[...] the history of any country resolves itself into the biographies of its stout, earnest and representative citizens". The nearly 200 instances of "Dresden" in the text lead to biographies and family genealogies ranging in length from passing references to a page or more. Indexed by family name, it includes many people prominent in the settlement, founding and early development of the community.

=== History ===
- Marie Carter's In the Light of Dawn : the History and Legacy of a Black Canadian Community (2025), positions the growth of Dresden as part of the history of the Dawn Settlement, focusing on the role of leading Black figures in the town's early development and, in the mid-twentieth century, human rights activism.
- Dresden is one of three small southern Ontario towns forming the case-studies for Rebecca Beausaert's Pursuing Play: Women's Leisure in Small-Town Ontario, 1870–1914 (2024), which examines women's recreational activities, both public and private, and their shaping by gender, class, and ethnicity.
- The intertwined strands of evangelical and abolitionist culture in mid-nineteenth century Dresden are described in Nina Reid-Maroney's The Reverend Jennie Johnson and African-Canadian History, 1868-1967 (2013).
- Written for children in grades 6 to 9, Season of Rage: Hugh Burnett and the Struggle for Civil Rights (2005), by John Cooper, dramatises how Dresden became a centre of Canada's civil rights struggle in the 1950s.
- Don Spearman's 1991 Landmarks From The Past : A pictorial history of Dresden and area, is a large-format, thematically organised collection of photographs, short biographies and reminiscences accumulated by the author during his more than 50 years as a journalist in the town.
- Published in conjunction with the 100th anniversary of the Dresden Fair and its accompanying exhibition, Helen Watson Burns's Over The Years (1975) is a detailed history of the Camden and Dresden Agricultural Societies, covering the evolution of the Fair and including the development of the Dresden Raceway.
- Alda L. Hyatt's The Story of Dresden 1825 – 1967 (1967) was published to commemorate Canada's Confederation Centennial. In this large-format, illustrated work, a short narrative history starting with the 1790 McKee Treaty is followed by thematic chapters on churches (in detail), military history, businesses, industry, entertainment, community organizations, the professions, and sports. Many pages include advertisements for businesses operating in and around Dresden in the 1960s, and The Story concludes with the programme for Dresden's own centennial celebration on 1 July 1967.
- The comprehensive A History of Dresden by Robert Brandon, published in 1954 to commemorate the centennial of the establishment of Dresden's post-office, was supplemented in 1982 by an update, The History of Dresden, to mark Dresden's 100th year since its incorporation as a town. Both works give detailed accounts of the development of the community from its earliest days.
- Also appearing in 1954 was Helen Watson Burns's Dresden Fire Department, which explored its history from the 1870s onwards.
- Victor Lauriston's Romantic Kent : The Story of a County 1626–1952, published in 1952, has a chapter on Dresden, with photographs, that has a particular focus on changes in transportation, infrastructure and industry over the years.

== Ecology ==
=== Management and governance ===
Under Ontario's scheme of ecological land classification, Dresden is in the St. Thomas ecodistrict, near the border with the neighbouring ecodistrict of Essex. The town's hinterland lies in both. An ecodistrict (Note: Ecodistricts are nested in an ecoregion that, in turn, is nested in an ecozone. The St. Thomas and Essex ecodistricts are part of the Lake Erie-Lake Ontario ecoregion (roughly corresponding with the Lake Erie Lowland ecoregion under the federal classification scheme) within the overarching Mixedwood Plains ecozone.) is characterized by a distinctive assemblage of terrain, landforms, geology, soil, vegetation, water bodies, and fauna.

Dresden and its locale are under the jurisdiction of the St. Clair Region Conservation Authority, which covers the Sydenham River watershed and smaller watersheds draining into southern Lake Huron, the St. Clair River, and northeastern Lake St. Clair. The Authority is responsible for reducing risks to life and property from flooding and erosion; water and land stewardship; forestry; wildlife habitat creation; and outdoor recreation.

Dresden also sits within the Thames-Sydenham & Region Source Protection Region, where a committee oversees the implementation of a plan to protect current and future sources of drinking-water.

=== Geology ===
The movement of glaciers and the influence of glacial lakes shaped the geology of the area around Dresden. Some 13 000 years ago, glacial Lake Whittlesey, followed by Lake Warren, covered most of the ecodistrict. Lake sediment settled in depressions, smoothing contours. This gently rolling landscape is now dominated by morainal deposits – rocky material of varying sizes carried (or pushed) and deposited by glacier ice – overlying carbonate-rich Palaeozoic bedrock. Glaciofluvial and alluvial deposits are found in the larger river valleys, including those of the Sydenham.

Fertile, grey-brown luvisolic soils dominate the area. These developed under the original forest cover from glacial deposits, and are favoured for agricultural and horticultural crops. Regosols are associated with alluvial deposits, such as along the Sydenham, whereas clayey gleysols are common in areas with poor drainage. Gleysols dominate to the west, in the Essex ecodistrict.

=== Land cover and vegetation ===
Over 80% of the landscape around Dresden is cropland or pasture, while 15% is deciduous forest (there is little coniferous), found mainly in parks, stewardship lands, (Note: Typically, managed under various provincial tax incentive or grant schemes.) and natural heritage (Note: Such as Areas of Natural and Scientific Interest.) areas. Mature forest is characterized by sugar maple (hard maple), American beech, white and Northern red oak, shagbark hickory, black walnut, and white walnut (butternut). Fresh, moist sites favour species including American elm, eastern cottonwood, balsam poplar, Manitoba maple, and silver maple (soft maple), with tulip tree, sycamore, and bitternut hickory preferring slopes. Dry, warm sites best suit black and chinquapin oak. Many more species – common, less common and rare – inhabit the area: some in the Sydenham River watershed are at risk. Dresden's arboretum has examples of many native species.

=== Fauna ===
Characteristic wildlife species include white-tailed deer, grey and red squirrel, racoon, and chipmunk. Bird species include the cardinal, wood thrush, screech-owl, great horned owl, mourning dove, green heron, pileated and red-bellied woodpecker, red-tailed hawk, northern harrier, and wild turkey.

The Sydenham River is populated by many species of fish and mussels, and, in its watershed, a range of amphibians, turtles, snakes, and dragonflies. However, a number of these species are at risk.

== Climate ==
The climate is mild, and classified as humid continental (Köppen climate classification Dfb), which closely borders on the Dfa type.

Summer days can be hot and humid, with a July high of 27.1 °C (80.8 °F) and a low of 15.7 °C (60.3 °F). In an average summer, temperatures reach or exceed 30 °C (86.0 °F) on 16 days a year.

Winters are cold, with a January high of −2.3 °C (27.9 °F) and a low of −9.0 °C (15.8 °F). Mild spells of weather occasionally lead to temperatures in excess of 10 °C (50.0 °F) for one or two days, while arctic air masses can bring temperatures below −20 °C (−4.0 °F) for one to three days. As Dresden is outside the snowbelt, which begins near London, Ontario, winter precipitation is usually low and snow-cover intermittent throughout the season, with an average annual snowfall of only 84.6 centimetres (33.3 in).

Climate data for Dresden, Ontario (1981–2010)
Month	Jan	Feb	Mar	Apr	May	Jun	Jul	Aug	Sep	Oct	Nov	Dec	Year
Record high °C (°F)	15.5 (59.9)	15.0 (59.0)	24.4 (75.9)	30.0 (86.0)	35.5 (95.9)	38.0 (100.4)	36.5 (97.7)	36.5 (97.7)	34.4 (93.9)	30.6 (87.1)	22.8 (73.0)	17.8 (64.0)	38.0 (100.4)
Mean daily maximum °C (°F)	−2.2 (28.0)	−0.9 (30.4)	4.8 (40.6)	12.2 (54.0)	19.6 (67.3)	24.7 (76.5)	27.1 (80.8)	25.9 (78.6)	21.4 (70.5)	14.6 (58.3)	6.9 (44.4)	1.1 (34.0)	12.9 (55.2)
Daily mean °C (°F)	−5.5 (22.1)	−4.4 (24.1)	0.7 (33.3)	7.3 (45.1)	13.9 (57.0)	19.1 (66.4)	21.4 (70.5)	20.3 (68.5)	16.0 (60.8)	10.0 (50.0)	3.5 (38.3)	−1.7 (28.9)	8.4 (47.1)
Mean daily minimum °C (°F)	−8.8 (16.2)	−7.9 (17.8)	−3.4 (25.9)	2.4 (36.3)	8.1 (46.6)	13.4 (56.1)	15.8 (60.4)	14.7 (58.5)	10.6 (51.1)	5.3 (41.5)	0.2 (32.4)	−4.5 (23.9)	3.8 (38.8)
Record low °C (°F)	−30.0 (−22.0)	−25.6 (−14.1)	−22.2 (−8.0)	−13.0 (8.6)	−3.5 (25.7)	0.0 (32.0)	5.5 (41.9)	0.0 (32.0)	−3.0 (26.6)	−8.0 (17.6)	−12.0 (10.4)	−25.0 (−13.0)	−30.0 (−22.0)
Average precipitation mm (inches)	51.5 (2.03)	48.5 (1.91)	55.4 (2.18)	79.5 (3.13)	76.5 (3.01)	90.2 (3.55)	80.4 (3.17)	80.2 (3.16)	107.5 (4.23)	68.7 (2.70)	84.8 (3.34)	65.6 (2.58)	888.9 (35.00)
Average rainfall mm (inches)	25.1 (0.99)	25.2 (0.99)	41.0 (1.61)	74.4 (2.93)	76.5 (3.01)	90.2 (3.55)	80.4 (3.17)	80.2 (3.16)	107.5 (4.23)	68.5 (2.70)	81.5 (3.21)	45.4 (1.79)	796.0 (31.34)
Average snowfall cm (inches)	26.5 (10.4)	23.3 (9.2)	14.3 (5.6)	5.2 (2.0)	0.0 (0.0)	0.0 (0.0)	0.0 (0.0)	0.0 (0.0)	0.0 (0.0)	0.2 (0.1)	3.3 (1.3)	20.2 (8.0)	93.0 (36.6)
Average precipitation days (≥ 0.2 mm)	11.5	9.8	11.2	13.7	10.8	9.5	10.1	10.2	11.5	11.1	12.1	13.4	134.7
Average rainy days (≥ 0.2 mm)	4.4	4.4	8.1	12.9	10.8	9.5	10.1	10.2	11.5	11.1	11.0	7.9	111.8
Average snowy days (≥ 0.2 cm)	7.5	5.9	3.9	1.3	0.0	0.0	0.0	0.0	0.0	0.06	1.2	7.2	27.0
Source: Environment Canada

== Notable people ==
- Josiah Henson (1789–1883) was an author, abolitionist, and minister. Born a slave, he escaped to Upper Canada (now Ontario), and, near Dresden, founded the British-American Institute, a vocational school associated with the Dawn Settlement, a community comprising refugees from slavery and freedmen and women. His autobiography is believed to have inspired the titular character of Harriet Beecher Stowe's novel Uncle Tom's Cabin.
- William Whipper (1804–1876), an African-American businessman and abolitionist, made substantial foundational investments in land, property and businesses in Dresden.
- Samuel H. Davis (1810–1907), an American pastor and abolitionist, became a headmaster at the British-American Institute. An experienced mason, he oversaw the construction of the First Regular Baptist Church in Dresden, donating 100 cords of wood to pay for the sawing of the lumber used, and succeeded William P. Newman as lead pastor.
- William P. Newman (1810/15–1866), a fugitive slave who became a Baptist minister, made numerous mission trips to Canada, founding schools and writing on abolitionist themes. A headmaster at the British-American Institute, he raised much of the funding for the construction of the First Regular Baptist Church in Dresden, and was its first pastor.
- Thomas Hughes (1818–1876), an English Anglican minister and abolitionist, moved to Dresden in 1859 at the request of Black leaders and under the aegis of the Colonial Church and School Society to establish a mission school and mission church (Note: A church that does not have full status as a parish church, and is supported by a parish, diocese, or other organization.) (now Christ Church Anglican) within the newly established Diocese of Huron.
- Thomas Robert McInnes (1840–1904), a Canadian physician, Member of Parliament, Senator, and a lieutenant-governor of British Columbia, was Dresden's first doctor.
- Anna Maria Weems (c. 1840–after 1863), born a slave in Rockville, Maryland, escaped at the age of 15, disguised as a coachman, to her aunt and uncle's home in Dresden. Abolitionists and Underground Railroad station-masters and conductors, including William Still, planned and oversaw her journey via Philadelphia, Washington, D.C., and Brooklyn, New York.
- Asa Ribble (1841–1911), a sailor who attained the rank of captain, served eight terms as mayor of Dresden. During his first term, in 1889, he oversaw the construction of a new bridge over the Sydenham River, replacing the 1864 original. He was also superintendent of agriculture for the short-lived Dresden Sugar Refining Company, which processed sugar beet. In addition, he was instrumental in establishing Dresden's first vegetable-canning factory.
- Lucretia Newman Coleman (1856–1948), born in Dresden, was the youngest daughter of William P. Newman. She became an African-American writer and journalist, publishing articles on scientific and philosophical themes that were well received by her contemporaries. Her poems, and her novelised biography of Benjamin Arnett, Poor Ben: A Story of Real Life, were critically acclaimed.
- Peter Wiley Philpott (1865–1957), a Canadian Christian fundamentalist and evangelist raised mainly in Dresden, founded the United Christian Workers, a working-class religious movement later known as the Associated Gospel Churches of Canada.
- Tom MacInnes (né Thomas Robert Edward McInnes) (1867–1951), son of Thomas Robert McInnes, was a Canadian poet and writer whose works include Lonesome Bar (1909; recollections of the Yukon gold rush), The Teaching of the Old Boy (1927; a translation of and commentary on Lao-tzu's philosophy), and three collections of poems.
- William Wallace Burns McInnes (1871–1954), son of Thomas Robert McInnes, was a Canadian politician, lawyer, and commissioner of Yukon in 1905-06.
- George Tackaberry (1874–1937) was a Canadian boot-maker who invented a long-lived brand of ice hockey skate sold by CCM, known as the "Tack".
- Eustace Haydon (1880–1975), a Canadian historian of religion and leading light in the humanist movement in the USA, was a Baptist minister in Dresden in 1903-04.
- Mildred Valley Thornton FRSA (née Stinson) (1890–1967), a Canadian artist, is known for her portraits of First Nations people and advocacy for First Nations' and women's rights. She has works in the permanent collections of the National Gallery of Canada and several other galleries.
- Goldwin Corlett Elgie (1896–1975) was a lawyer and politician in Ontario. He represented Woodbine in the Legislative Assembly of Ontario from 1934 to 1943, and from 1945 to 1948 as a Conservative and then Progressive Conservative member.
- Abraham Feinberg (1899–1986), an American rabbi, singer and activist who lived much of his life in Canada, took part in the campaign to promote equal rights for African-Canadians, visiting Dresden.
- Graeme Delamere Black DSO MC (1911–1942), born in Dresden, led the Operation Musketoon raid by British and Norwegian commandos during World War II in Norway; he was captured and later executed at Sachsenhausen concentration camp under Hitler's Commando Order.
- Hugh Burnett (1918–1991), a carpenter in Dresden and Canadian civil rights leader, co-founded the anti-discrimination National Unity Association, whose efforts led to the passage of Ontario's Fair Employment Practices Act (1951) and Fair Accommodation Practices Act (1954). This paved the way for subsequent anti-discrimination legislation in Ontario and across Canada.
- Bromley Armstrong CM OOnt (1926–2018), Canadian civil rights leader, promoted equal rights for African-Canadians and took part, in 1954, in sit-ins in Dresden restaurants that refused to serve Blacks.
- Ruth Lor Malloy (née Lor) (born 1932), Canadian journalist, writer, and activist, was a key figure in the fight against discrimination in Ontario in the 1950s, and participated, with Bromley Armstrong and Hugh Burnett, in the 1954 sit-ins in Dresden restaurants that refused to serve Blacks. Her memoir Brightening My Corner: a Memoir of Dreams Fulfilled was published in 2023.
- Ken Houston (1953–2018), a Canadian ice hockey player in the Canadian National Hockey League (NHL) between 1975 and 1984, helped the Calgary Flames reach the NHL playoff semifinals in 1981.The ice hockey arena in Dresden, the Ken Houston Memorial Agricultural Centre, is named in his honour, and the Ken Houston Memorial Pace, an annual harness horse race at Dresden Raceway, is dedicated to him.
- Jeff Jackson (born 1965) is CEO of hockey operations for the Edmonton Oilers and a former professional ice hockey winger, playing in 263 games in the Canadian National Hockey League. He played for the Toronto Maple Leafs, New York Rangers, Quebec Nordiques, and Chicago Blackhawks.
- Thomas James Brodie (born 1990), raised on a farm near Dresden, is a Canadian professional ice hockey player for the Toronto Maple Leafs in the Canadian National Hockey League.

== Memorials ==
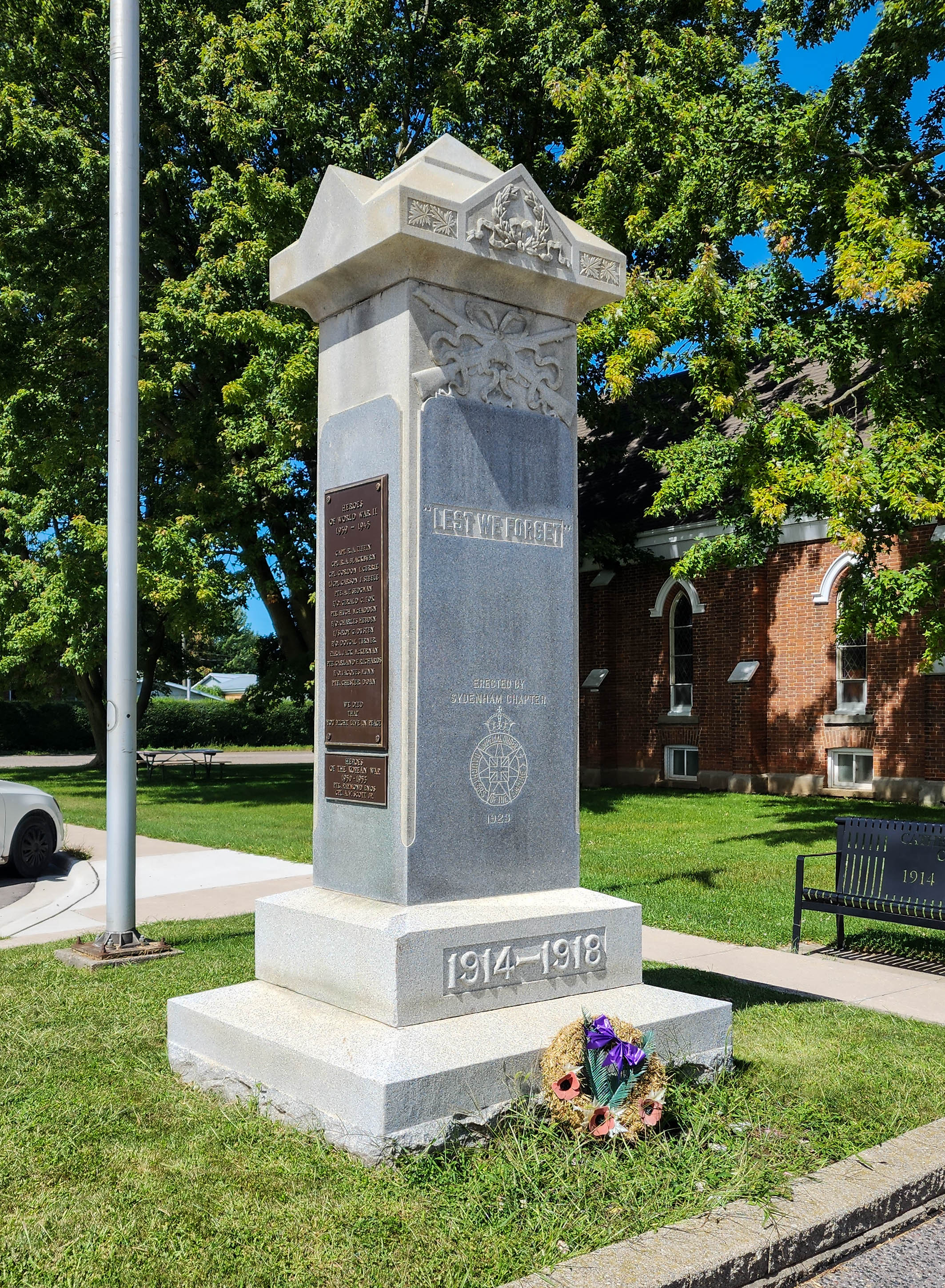
The Dresden Cenotaph

The Dresden Cenotaph, sited at the corner of St. George Street and Queen Street, displays the names of the dead of World War I, World War II, and the Korean War. It is complemented by information about the dead held by the Canadian Virtual War Memorial and Library and Archives Canada.

In Dresden Cemetery, a war memorial is dedicated to those who were killed in World War I, World War II, and the Korean War. A surrounding memorial field contains crosses commemorating each of the dead. The cemetery, which has over 7000 memorials, also displays a memorial plaque marking the movement, between 2004 and 2006, of nearly 1000 erosion-threatened gravesites: these include those of several church founders, church leaders, abolitionists, Underground Railroad conductors, and town founders. A public park, the Rotary Memorial Gardens, contains memorial stones.

In Dresden, two honour rolls inside St. Andrew's Presbyterian Church list the names of parishioners who served in the military in World Wars I and II. Honour rolls are also displayed inside the First Regular Baptist Church – for parishioners who served in World War II; inside the North Dresden Baptist Church – for those who served or were killed in World War II; and inside Christ Church Anglican – for those who served in World Wars I and II. As an act of remembrance, the Royal Canadian Legion Branch 113 Dresden displays a poster of a particular veteran each week in the Legion Hall.

The Gathering Our Heroes C-K project is compiling a database of all veterans of both World Wars with a connection to Chatham-Kent. Starting in 2013 with the digitization of books of remembrance, by the end of 2023 it had accumulated entries for over 10,000 people, drawing on military records, newspaper reports, and submissions by members of the public. Besides names and service details, many entries include biographical information.

A plaque on the bank of the River Sydenham commemorates six men killed on 14 August 1957 at a cave-in during excavations for the building of a water-treatment plant. A documentary has been in development since 2023.

Inside the Ken Houston Memorial Agricultural Centre, two plaques record the dedication of both the old municipal arena building and its replacement, the current Centre, (Note: Known as the Lambton-Kent Memorial Agricultural Centre until December 2018.) as a memorial to those who served in the military or were killed. Ken Houston is himself commemorated by a statue outside the Centre. The Tony Stranak Conservation Area commemorates a long-serving former mayor of Dresden, while all Dresden's mayors, from 1882 to 1997, are memorialised on a plaque in the Municipal Centre.
