= Thomas Hughes (priest, born 1818) =

Priest in Canada from 1859 to 1876

Reverend Thomas Hughes
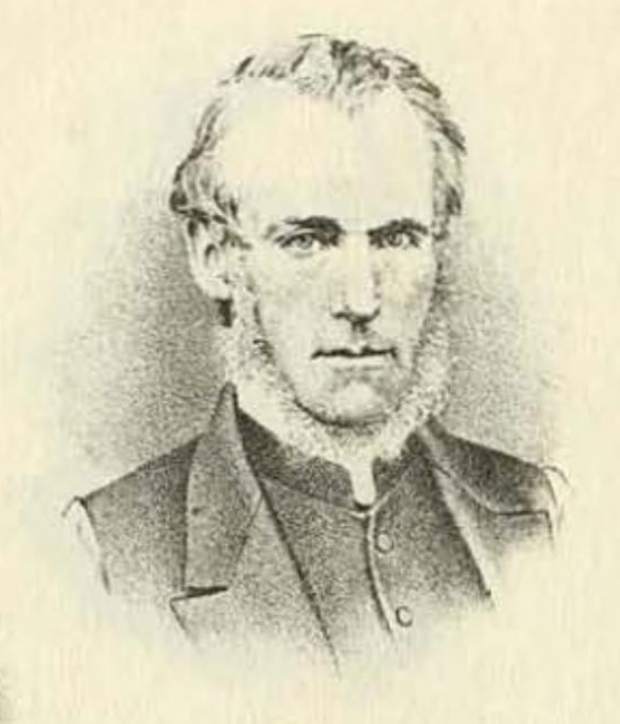
- Photograph of Thomas Hughes in an 1880 historical atlas
- Born: 1818; Walsall, Staffordshire
- Died: 12 April 1876 (aged 57–58); Dresden, Ontario
- Burial place: Dresden, Ontario
- Occupation: priest
- Years active: 1859–1876
- Known for: Diary; abolitionism; friendship with Josiah Henson
- Spouse: Ann (née Tonks)
- Children: Horatio; Alfred; Thomas; William; Henrietta; Eleanor; Walter
- Father: Thomas Hughes
- Religion: Christian
- Church: Anglican Church of Canada
- Ordained: 11 December 1859 by Isaac Hellmuth
- Writings: Diary (1861–1873)
- Congregations served: Dresden, Ontario; Dawn Mills, Ontario; Kent Bridge, Ontario; Chatham Township (Note: Now part of the municipality of Chatham-Kent.)
- Offices held: Rural dean of Kent.; Inspector of schools for Camden and Zone Townships.; Trustee of the British-American Institute.
- Website: Diary of Thomas Hughes

Thomas Hughes (1818–1876) was an Anglican minister and abolitionist from Walsall, Staffordshire, who moved to Dresden in Canada West in 1859 to establish a mission school and mission church (Note: A church that does not have full status as a parish church, and is supported by a parish, diocese, or other organization.) in the newly established Diocese of Huron.

He ministered to several congregations, and was appointed as a rural dean, an inspector of township schools, and a trustee of the British-American Institute, befriending Josiah Henson, its principal founder.

His diary provides insights into the abolitionist culture of 19th-century Dresden.

== Biography ==
=== Early life ===
Thomas Hughes was born in Walsall, Staffordshire, in 1818. In 1842, he married Anne Tonks. In their marriage certificate, his profession is given as schoolmaster, and his father's, file-maker. From the mid-1850s, Hughes taught at Queen Mary's Grammar School in Walsall. The 1851 census records a family of five children.

=== Life in Canada ===
==== London ====
In 1856, Hughes moved to Canada to teach at a pioneering integrated school in London, Canada West, established in 1854 by the Colonial Church and School Society, the missionary arm of the Anglican faith. The school was noted as "flourishing" by the examining chaplain to the bishop of the diocese, though its rationale had earlier been questioned by the Provincial Freeman, an Afro-Canadian, abolitionist newspaper.

While in London, Hughes studied for Anglican holy orders under the guidance of then Archdeacon Isaac Hellmuth and the Right Reverend Benjamin Cronyn, first bishop of the Diocese of Huron. Hughes was ordained as a deacon on 28 September 1858 and as a priest on 11 December 1859. During a tour of inspection of the Society's activities in Canada West, Hellmuth wrote:

London, Canada West, Sept. 25, 1858 – Thank God we have now a respectable staff of agents, of every variety and color. [...] Mr. Hughes is a sterling character, and esteemed in the community for his consistent Christian conduct; he has a real missionary spirit, single minded, and from the motive desires to preach Christ to colored and white [...].

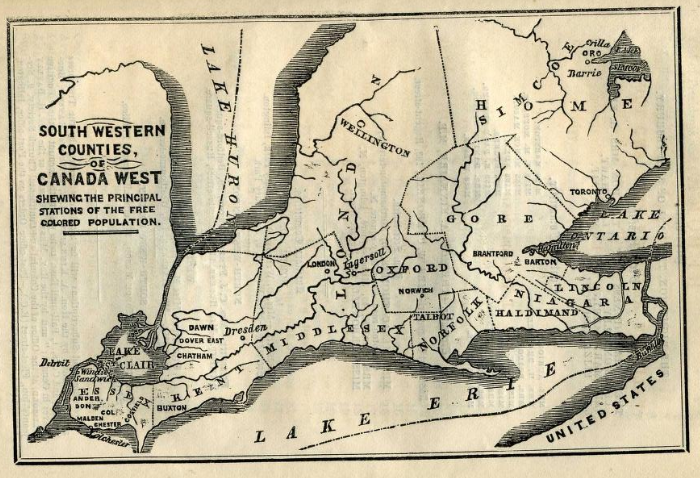
Principal communities of freedmen in southwestern Canada West, c. 1860, where the Colonial Church and School Society was active

By the late 1850s, public schools (Note: Known as "common schools".) in London had become open to both Black and white pupils. Following requests by William P. Newman, a Black Baptist pastor and abolitionist, and other Black leaders, the Society decided to close its London school and open a mission in Dresden, where schools remained segregated. Hughes accepted the new posting, and accompanied by Jemima Williams, an English schoolteacher working in the London mission, moved to Dresden with his family in 1859.

==== Dresden ====
Soon after Hughes' arrival in Dresden, he began to hold services in the town hall of nearby Dawn Mills. In Dresden, though, he encountered resistance from those in charge of places suitable for public worship (such as the school for white children), while white property-owners refused to sell him a building-lot. He had to use a room above a grocery store.

In 1860, Hughes bought a farm lying between Dawn Mills and Dresden from William P. Newman, who had left Canada the year before. After Jemima Williams' death that same year, Alfred Whipper, a brother of William Whipper, a leading Black businessman, was appointed as teacher in her place. Shortly after, Isaac Hellmuth inspected the Dresden mission, reporting that:

Dresden, Feb. 28, 1860 – Here I spent last Sunday and part of Saturday and Monday. The work under Mr. Hughes, I am happy to report, is really prospering; he is much beloved by the colored and the white people, and I think he has done much in a quiet and humble but most effectual way to soften the prejudices between the white and colored people. His services are attended by both classes. The room in which he officiates was crowded last Sunday [...]. On Monday I visited the school under Mr. Whipper. Average attendance, fifty (entirely colored); and here regular religious instruction is given by our faithful missionary [...].

In the Society's report for 1860–61, Hughes was commended for his missionary work: "The Reports of preceding years, and the following statements of the missionary, will supply all needful information respecting this station and the labors of the Rev. T. Hughes. He has most satisfactorily filled the position assigned to him by the Society, and has won the esteem and confidence of the Committee and friends in Canada." The 1861 census records an expanding Hughes family.

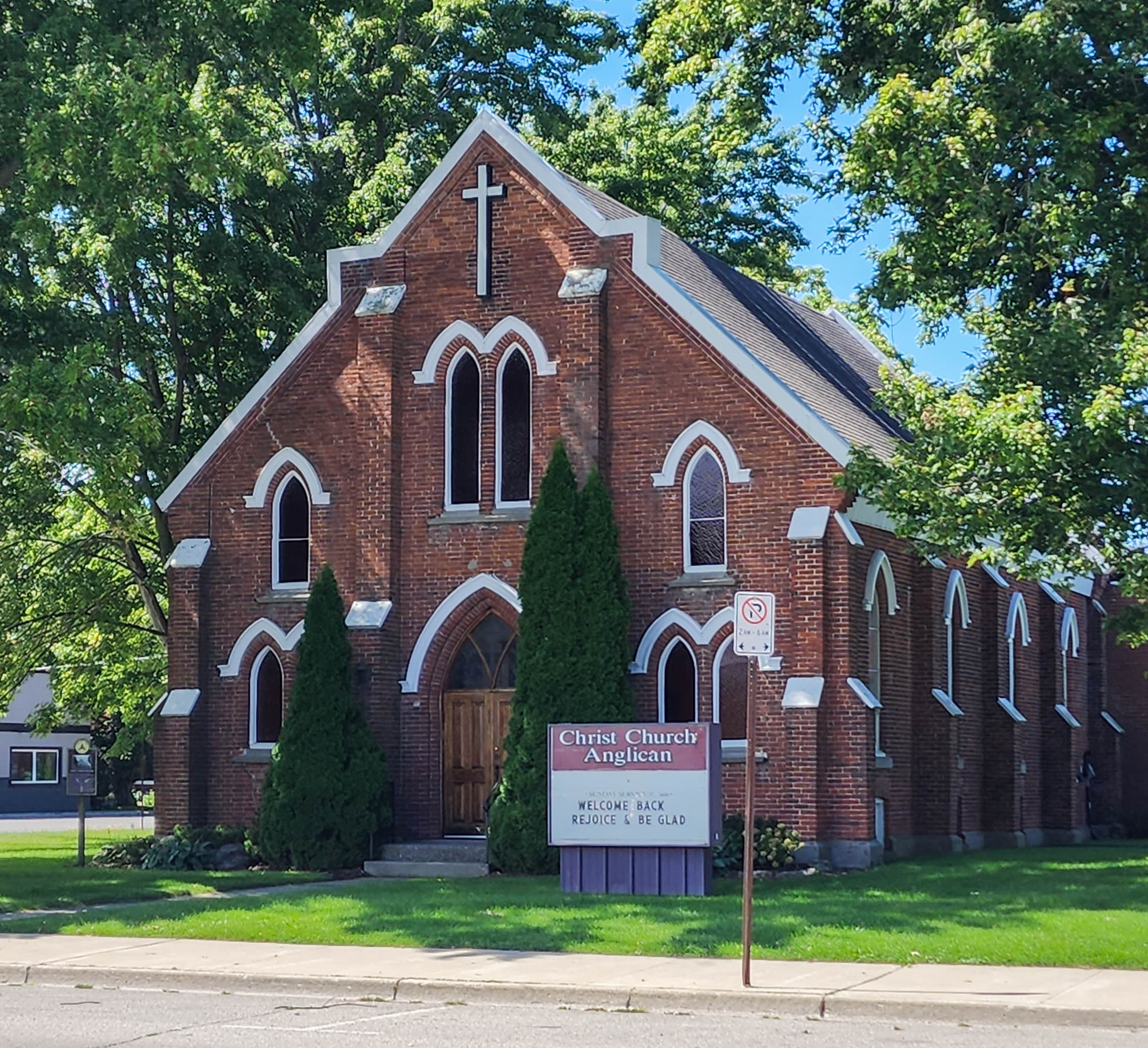
Christ Church Anglican in Dresden in 2024

Parker T. Smith, carpenter, pharmacist and one-time president of the Banneker Institute, a literary society in Philadelphia, lived with his family in Dresden in 1861/62. Together with Hughes, he established a literary and debating society, the Dresden Mutual Improvement Association. Smith recounted his experiences in letters published in the Christian Recorder, describing Hughes as "A gentleman of distinguished ability and learning as a theologian", and "An untiring advocate of the equality of man, and knows no complexional distinction".

In 1863, Kent County was divided for the first time into different school inspectorates, and Hughes was appointed the inspector for the townships of Camden and Zone. He was later ordained as the rural dean of Kent.

In the mid-1860s, Hughes and his congregation erected a church using raw materials from Hughes' farmland. Now called Christ Church Anglican, it was first known as the "Episcopal Mission Church to the Freed Population of Canada". In 1868, Hughes became a member of the board of trustees of the British-American Institute.

=== Death ===
After a two-week illness, Thomas Hughes died in Dresden on 12 April 1876 from "general congestion from cold". (Note: As a 19th-century medical term, "congestion" denoted an abnormal accumulation of blood in an organ, such as in the phrase "congestion of the lungs".) He was buried in Dresden cemetery in the racially integrated Anglican section — the riverside "Anglican range" — which he had himself established. (Note: Threatened by erosion, the Anglican range was relocated in 2004–2006.) His will was proved and registered at Kent County's surrogate court and its administration granted to Hughes' executors, his sons Thomas and William. Probate was granted in England later that year, with the value of his estate given as "under £450". (Note: According to the Bank of England's inflation calculator, this was worth the equivalent of about £43,500 in May 2024.)

== Letters and diary ==
Each year, Hughes wrote a letter to his employer, the Colonial Church and School Society. The letters were published in the Society's annual reports. He also kept a diary of his doings and reflections from 1861 to 1873.

=== Views ===
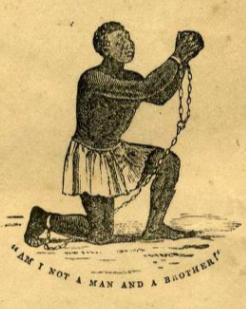
Image (1860) on front cover of annual reports, from 1859 to 1864, (Note: After the abolition of slavery in the USA, the branch changed its name in 1865 to Mission to the Coloured Population of Canada.) of the Mission to Fugitive Slaves in Canada, a branch of the Colonial and Continental Church Society, (Note: Until mid-1861, the Society's name was the Colonial Church and School Society.) Thomas Hughes' employer

Drawing on this material, Reid-Maroney (2013) concludes that Hughes first saw his encounters with the Black community of Dresden through the lens of the Society's guiding narrative, a narrative that had aroused his compassion and led him to come to Canada: the rescue of fugitive slaves by whites.

However, in her view, after meeting independent, politically active Black families in Dresden who did not match his expectations, Hughes' original attitude changed – it was largely supplanted by a sense of kinship and partnership, particularly when it came to (as Reid-Maroney quotes from Hughes' diary), "the little band between whom and myself actually exists the relation of pastor and people." As pastor, notes Reid-Maroney, Hughes gave charitable assistance freely and provided spiritual counsel; the members of his church, though, were far from passive, providing a room for the school, a building-lot for the church, and presenting new clothes to Hughes and members of his family.

Reid-Maroney also points out that Hughes became attentive to how class differences intersected with lines drawn by colour. She remarks how he wrote, in a letter of 1861 to the Society, "We have several extremely well-conducted families here, not fugitives, whose habits and manners and general intelligence are far in advance of the majority of the whites in the neighbourhood". She goes on to illustrate, from the same letter, how Hughes viewed those who were against slavery yet prejudiced against Blacks:

What makes the matter more shocking is this, that all branches of the Christian Church give way to it! Ministers, both in the States and in Canada, being for the most part dependent on their congregations for support, are in no position to set themselves against the general feeling. While, therefore, numbers are to be found loud and eloquent enough in their advocacy of the abolition of slavery, and denouncing in the strongest terms the cruelty of the slave-owner; yet hardly a minister of the Gospel can be met with, who will take the free-colored man by the hand and treat him as a friend and brother.

According to Reid-Maroney, who points to a diary entry made a decade later (not long before the consecration of the mission church), Hughes had by then become deeply disappointed about what he perceived as a hardening of racial prejudice:

Felt very much depressed in spirit today. Sometimes think that my work is done in this mission. The change brought about by the great influence of the whites has made my work much more trying and difficult than formerly. The unchristian prejudice against color seems to be ineradicable.

She summarises his intellectual trajectory as follows: "Thomas Hughes had come to Dresden lamenting the ignorance of the 'poor fugitives'; by the 1870s it was the ignorance of white churchgoers he deplored."

== Recognition ==
Rev. Hughes was a great friend of Josiah Henson, who wrote a tribute to him in the second version of his autobiography.

== Memorials ==
The memorial plaque in Christ Church Anglican, the church he established, reads:

In Memory of the Reverend Thomas Hughes, First Incumbent of this Church, and Rural Dean of Kent; Who died April 12, 1876; Aged 58 years. "It is appointed unto men once to die, but after this the judgement" (Note: The Bible (King James Version), Hebrews 9:27.) Be ye therefore ready.

== See also ==
- Abolitionism – Movement to end slavery
- Anglican Church of Canada
- British-American Institute – Vocational school founded by Josiah Henson
- Dresden, Ontario – Agricultural community in Ontario, Canada
- Josiah Henson – American abolitionist and minister
- William P. Newman – Abolitionist and Baptist minister
