= The North Star: Finding Black Mecca =

2021 Canadian documentary film

- Directed by: Angel Panag; Torrin Blades
- Written by: Angel Panag
- Produced by: Angel Panag; Godfred Adjei; Torrin Blades
- Starring: Adam Arenson; Gayle George; Deirdre McCorkindale
- Cinematography: Godfred Adjei
- Edited by: Skye Bryden-Blom; Jennie Cyril
- Music by: Chudi Harris
- Distributed by: Canadian Broadcasting Corporation
- Release date: 2021
- Running time: 22 minutes
- Country: Canada
- Language: English

The North Star: Finding Black Mecca is a 2021 Canadian documentary film about the Black Canadian communities of Chatham, Dresden and Buxton in Ontario. The film is almost entirely narrated by community members themselves, with some input from academics who have studied the settlements. The film highlights the self-sufficiency of the local Black community, the early civil rights work of the National Unity Association, the Chatham Coloured All-Stars, as well as the international influence of local figures including Mary Ann Shadd and Fergie Jenkins. The film's title song Summer Night Songs is performed by singer Chudi Harris and 2020 Polaris Music Prize nominee Aquakultre.

The North Star: Finding Black Mecca won awards at the Niagara Falls International Film Festival, Canada Shorts Film Festival and screened at festivals around Canada and the U.S., including the Seattle Black Film Festival, the Montreal International Film Festival, Roxbury Film Festival, CaribbeanTales International Film Festival and the Denton Black Film Festival in Texas.

The film was self-funded by the producers, and later picked up by the CBC. The North Star: Finding Black Mecca premiered on CBC Television on September 18, 2021.

== Cast ==
- Adam Arenson
- Gayle George
- Deirdre McCorkindale
- Samantha Meredith
- Paul Mooney
