= Josiah Henson Museum of African-Canadian History =

- Musée Josiah Henson l'histoire des Afro-Canadiens
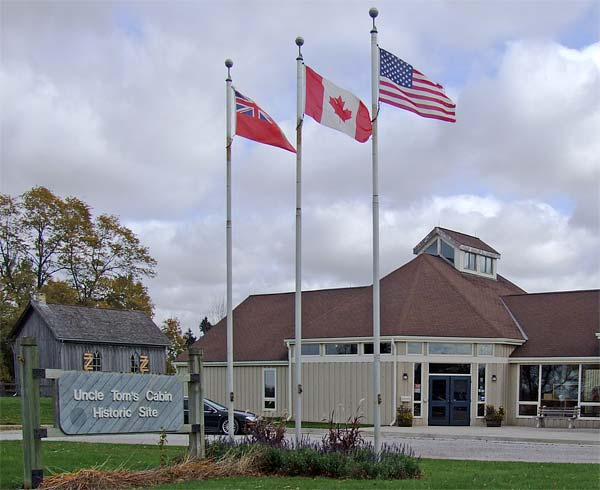
- Visitor centre for Josiah Henson Museum of African-Canadian History
- Established: 1964; 61 years ago
- Location: 29251 Freedom Road, Dresden, Ontario, Canada
- Coordinates: 42°35′00″N 82°11′50″W
- Type: Open air museum
- Site manager: Steven Cook
- Owner: Ontario Heritage Trust
- Website: www.heritagetrust.on.ca/properties/josiah-henson-museum

Ontario Heritage Act
- Official name: Josiah Henson Museum of African-Canadian History
- Designated: 6 April 2005

The Josiah Henson Museum of African-Canadian History (French: Musée Josiah Henson l'histoire des Afro-Canadiens) is an open-air museum in Dresden, Ontario, Canada, that documents the life of Josiah Henson, the history of slavery, and the Underground Railroad. The historic site is situated on the grounds of the former Dawn settlement established by Henson; a runaway slave, abolitionist, and minister. Through his autobiography, The Life of Josiah Henson, Formerly a Slave, Now an Inhabitant of Canada, as Narrated by Himself, he served as the inspiration for the title character in Harriet Beecher Stowe's Uncle Tom's Cabin.

The 2-hectare (5-acre) historic site contains an interpretive centre, several historic buildings from the Dawn settlement, and two cemeteries; one of which holds Henson's gravesite. Informal tours of Henson's family home began in 1948, although the larger property was not converted into a museum until 1964, after several other related historical structures were moved onto the historic site. The museum, initially known as Uncle Tom's Cabin Historic Site, was privately owned until 1988, when it was sold to Kent County. Ownership of the property was later transferred to St. Clair Parkway Commission in 1995, before it was transferred to the Ontario Heritage Trust in 2005.

== History ==
The museum resides on the Dawn settlement, a community formed by Josiah Henson, a Methodist preacher and runaway slave who escaped to Canada 28 October 1830. Henson arrived in Canada in 1830, although he returned to the United States on a number of occasions, to encourage and facilitate the escape of other slaves to Canada as a conductor for the Underground Railroad. Henson is believed to have personally led 118 enslaved people to Canada. Henson also led a Black Canadian Militia unit as its captain in support of the government during the Rebellions of 1837–1838.

=== Dawn settlement ===
The Dawn settlement was formed several years after the rebellion in 1841, with an 81 hectares (200 acres) property purchased as a refuge and a place of work for former slaves from the United States. Henson also purchased an additional 81 hectares (200 acres) of land adjacent to the community, later selling 40 hectares (100 acres) of that property back to the Dawn settlement. The settlement grew a number of crops, and cultivated eastern black walnut lumber to export to the United Kingdom and the United States. In 1842, Henson helped co-found the British-American Institute in Dawn, providing its settlers with vocational education. A sawmill was also erected within the settlement, whose products won Henson a medal at the Great Exhibition in London. As a result of administrative problems, management of the settlement was assumed by the British and Foreign Anti-Slavery Society in 1849.

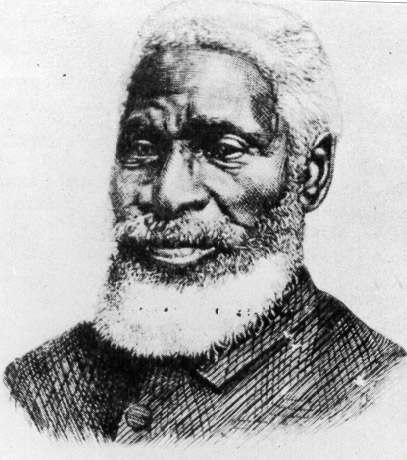
Josiah Henson established the Dawn settlement in 1841.

In 1849, Henson published an autobiography of his life, The Life of Josiah Henson, Formerly a Slave, Now an Inhabitant of Canada, as Narrated by Himself, garnering attention from abolitionists. The autobiography later served as the inspiration for the titular character in Harriet Beecher Stowe anti-slavery novel, Uncle Tom's Cabin. The publication of Uncle Tom's Cabin was initially controversial, with American pro-slavery advocates calling the novel an exaggerated fiction. Stowe responded to the critiques by publishing another book, A Key to Uncle Tom's Cabin. The second book provided an annotated bibliography of sources she consulted to write Uncle Tom's Cabin; with Stowe noting that she drew inspiration for Uncle Tom from the "published memoirs of the venerable Josiah Henson... now pastor of the missionary settlement at Dawn, in Canada".

At its peak, there were approximately 500 settlers residing in the Dawn settlement. However, a number of settlers began to return to the United States following the Emancipation Proclamation in 1862. During the American Civil War, Henson supported families in the settlement whose male members returned to the United States to fight in the civil war. The settlement went into decline after the British-American Institute was closed in 1868, and the remaining settlers moved to other communities within Ontario. However, Henson remained at the settlement, dying in 1883; buried near his home. Henson's funeral remains one of Dresden's largest funerals held in the community, with businesses closed for the day, and a 3.2 kilometres (2 mi) procession to the gravesite having formed. Following Henson's death, his spouse sold the homestead and moved to Michigan.

==== Post-settlement history ====
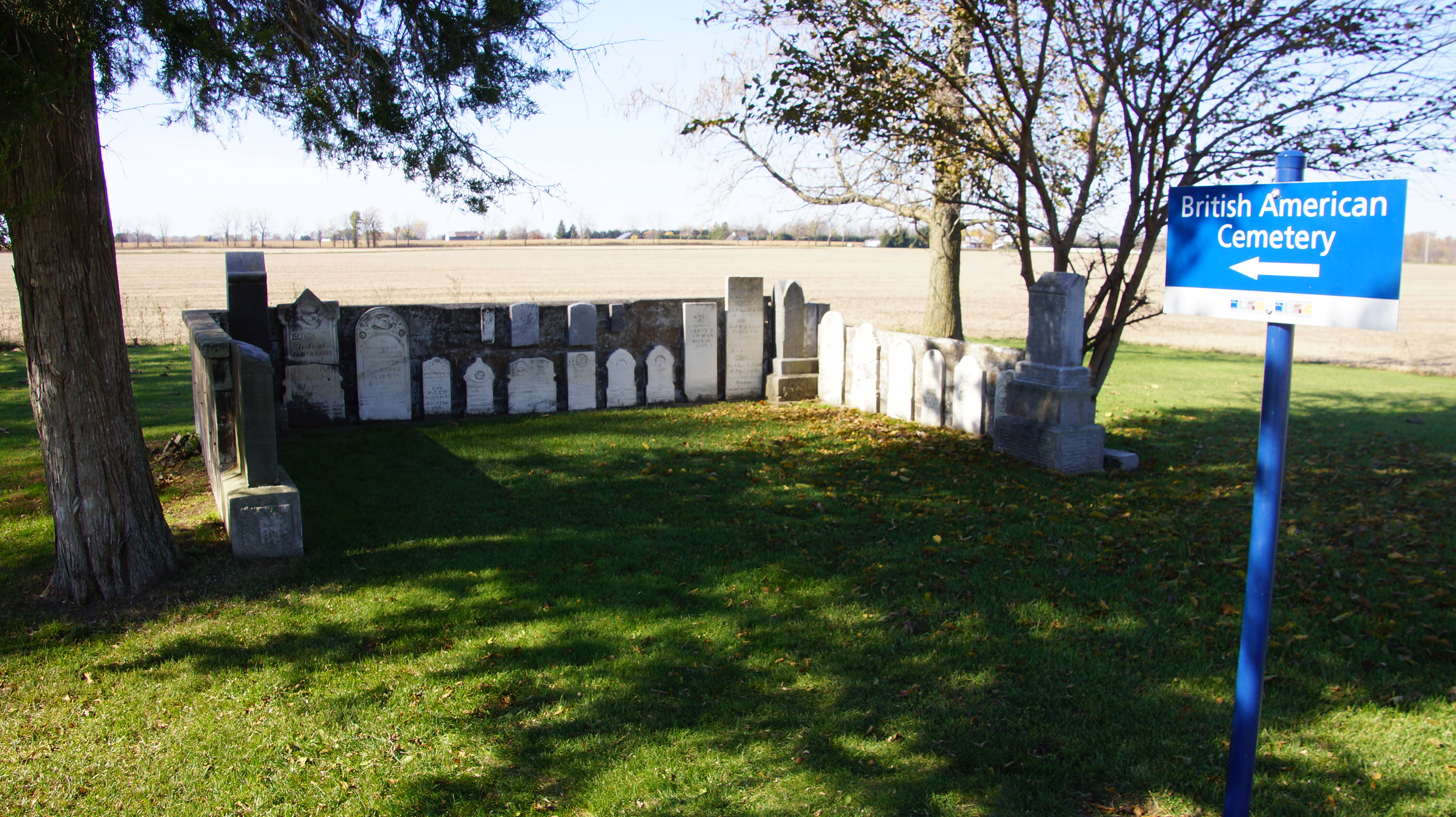
In the 1930s, the gravesites on the property were cared for by the Imperial Order Daughters of the Empire, and the Dresden Horticultural Society.

After Henson's spouse sold the home the building was left unattended. During the 1920s, the house became a site for pilgrimage for Black Freemasons, with Henson having joined the masonry late in his life. In 1930 members of the Imperial Order Daughters of the Empire (IODE) began to care for the gravesites on location; with the Dresden & District Horticultural Society agreeing to assist the IODE in maintaining the property the following year. In May 1933, maintenance of the gravesite was formally granted to the horticultural society.

=== Museum history ===
The owner of the property surrounding the Henson home, William Chapple, saw the house as a potential tourist attraction and opened it to the public in 1948. Chapple published a book in an attempt to promote the building, The Story of Uncle Tom, and began to provide tours of the building. Admission to the house was through drop in contributions, with visitors placing their donation in a pot outside the building's access point. Chapple later sold his property to Jack Thomson. During the Thomson period of property ownership, the Henson homestead was moved twice, reorienting it from its original position. Thomson later opened the entire property as a museum in 1964. Shortly after the property was opened into a museum, Thomson sought out a descendant of Henson, Barbara Carter, to work as its curator. During Carter's tenure as the museum's curator, she helped shift the institution's focus from just chronicling Henson's life, to incorporate the history of slavery and the Underground Railroad in its exhibits.

In 1984, the property was sold to Kent County, which operated the museum until 1995, when the property was transferred to the St. Clair Parkway Commission. A C$1.2 million restoration of the property took place the year the property was transferred to the commission; restoring the buildings to their older configurations and constructing a visitor centre. In 1999, the Historic Sites and Monuments Board of Canada placed a plaque next to the grave of Henson, recognizing him as a "Canadian of National Historic Significance". In 2005, the property was transferred again to the Ontario Heritage Trust, an agency of Ontario's Ministry of Heritage, Sport, Tourism and Culture Industries. In the same year, three historic buildings on the property were designated as heritage buildings through the provincial Ontario Heritage Act.

In the 2010s, the museum's administration considered renaming the historic site to reflect Henson's actual name, and to avoid association with the derogatory Uncle Tom moniker that emerged from late-19th century minstrel shows. In July 2022, the museum changed its name from Uncle Tom's Cabin Historic Site to the Josiah Henson Museum of African-Canadian History.

== Grounds ==
The historic site is situated in southwest Dresden, near the Sydenham River. It operates as an open-air museum, situated on 2.0 hectares (5 acres) of land that once housed the Dawn settlement's British-American Institute. The property houses an interpretive visitor centre that was erected in 1994, and includes the North Star Theatre, the Underground Railroad Freedom Gallery, and gift shop. The theatre typically exhibits a video that documents Henson's life; whereas the gallery features artifacts relating to the Dawn settlement, Henson's life, and the Underground Railroad. Items in the museum's collection includes an early edition of his autobiography.

Two cemeteries are located on the historic site, one being the British-American Institute, and the other being the Henson family cemetery. Only 21 headstones are present at the Henson family cemetery, although it is believed that more than 300 graves are located there. A memorial monument commemorating Henson is placed near his grave, marked by a Masonic symbol, and a crown to signify his visit with Queen Victoria.

In addition to the visitor centre, and gravesites, the property also contains several historic structures, including three buildings recognized by the Ontario Heritage Act, a sawmill, and a smokehouse.

=== Historic buildings ===
There are presently three historic buildings in the grounds of the Josiah Henson Museum that are recognized under the Ontario Heritage Act, all originating from the 19th century. Two of the historic residential buildings originate from inhabitants of the Dawn settlement, while the Pioneer Church is a historic building that was relocated to the historic site.

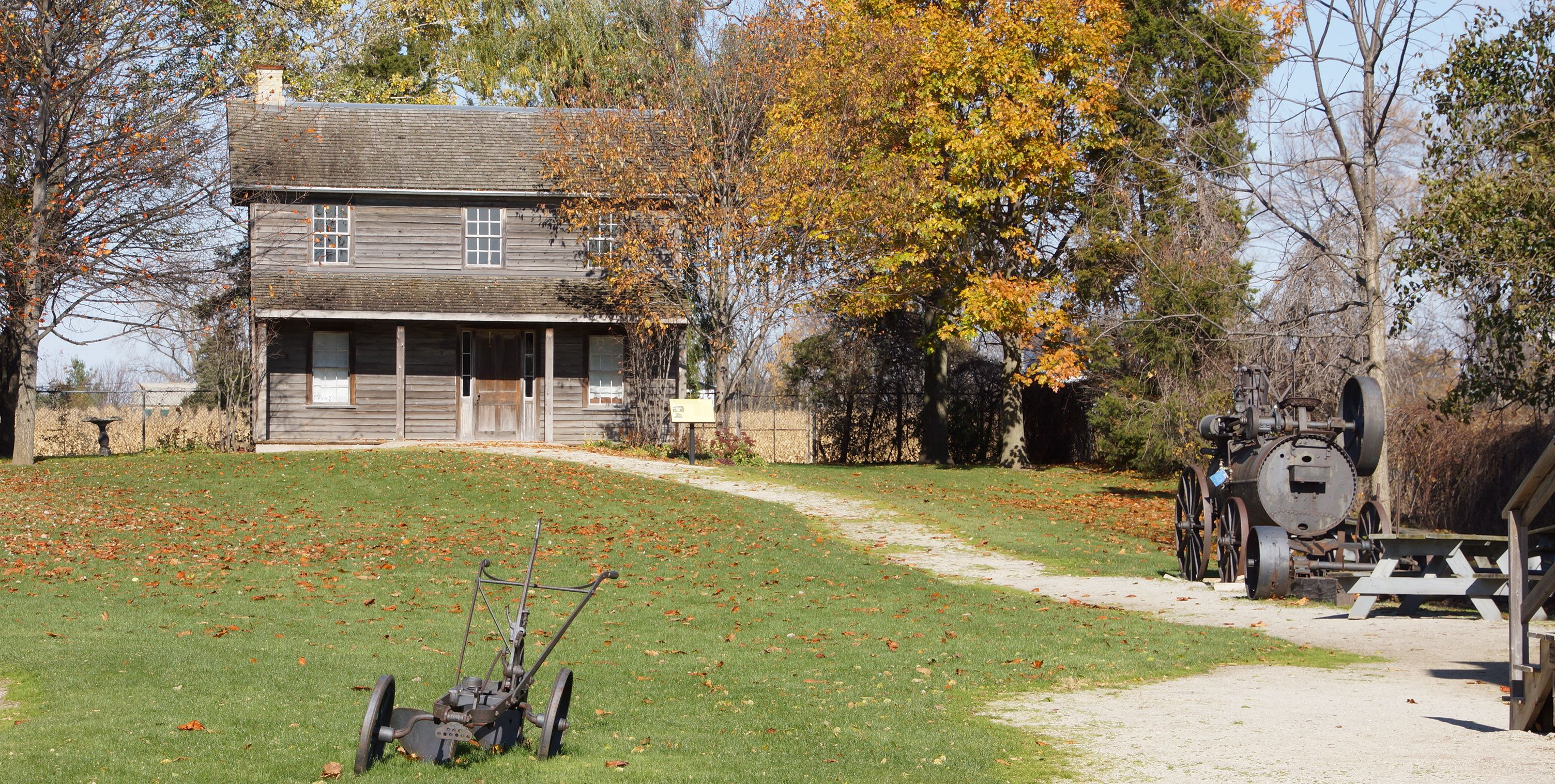
The Henson homestead was the home Henson resided in while living in Dawn.

The Henson family home is a typical example of 19th century vernacular architecture, being a two-storey post-and-beam structure clad in clapboard. The home is built from local materials such as red oak. The building was physically moved several times since the Henson family moved from the property; although its location was always within the original confines of the Dawn settlement. The home's original location has since been occupied by open farmland. Precisely dating the age of the Henson home remains difficult due to a lack of conclusive evidence. Estimates to when it was erected range from the early-1840s to mid-1870s, although more recent efforts to date the building suggest a year around 1850. In 1995, the building was restored to its 1850s configuration, which saw the removal of a fireplace not a part of the building's original construction; and the construction of the building's original front porch on the southern exterior of the home. During the same restoration period, the inner beams were strengthened, and the clapboards were replaced.

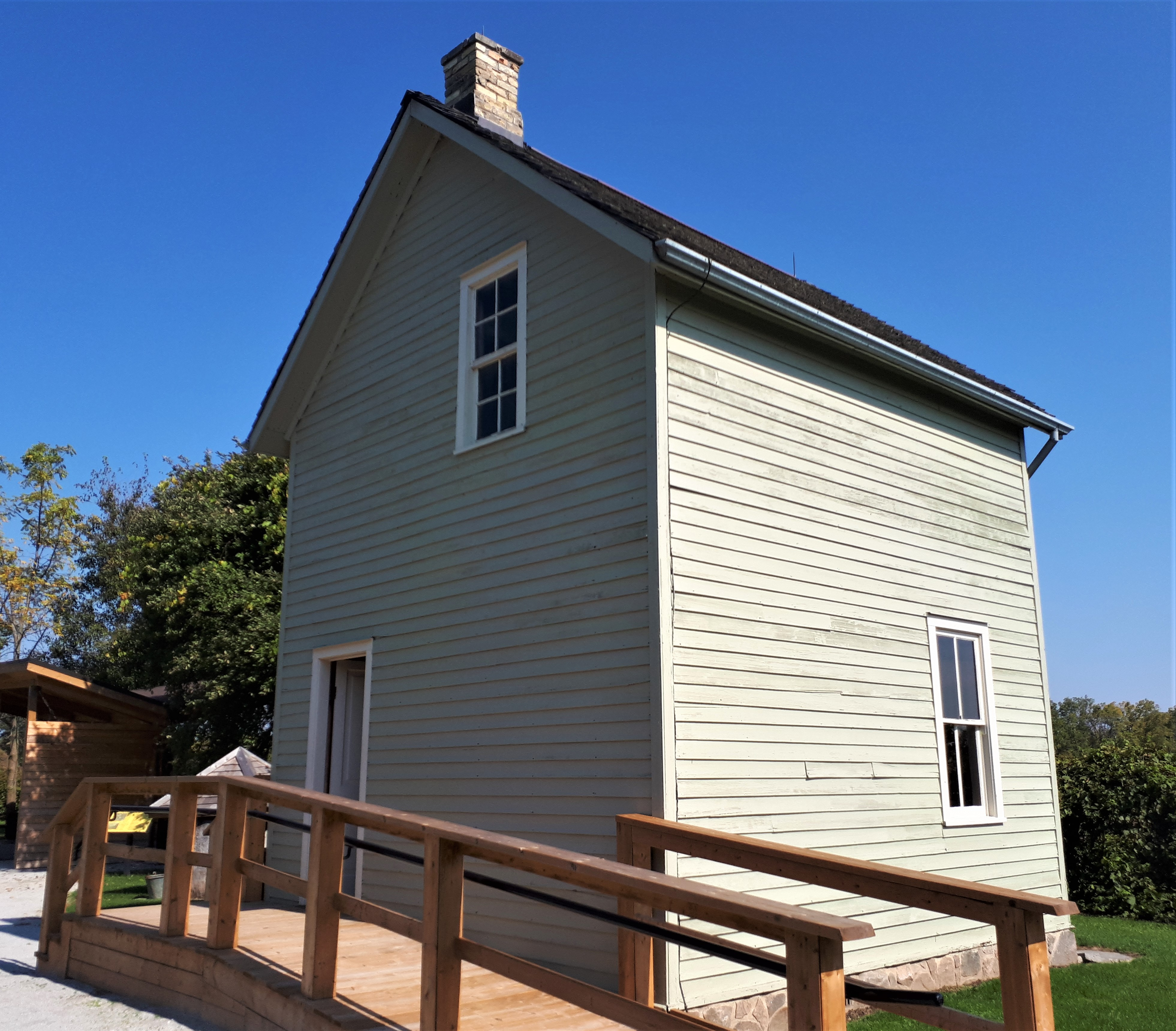
The Harris House is a historic structure that was relocated to property from Dresden.

The Harris House is another historic two-storey, clapboard-clad building located on the property. Built in 1890, the Harris House was originally situated elsewhere in Dresden. After its original occupants left the home, it was used as a granary for a nearby farm, before being moved to the museum property in 1964 to assist with museum operations. The structure itself is a vernacular building style typically built by Black refugees arriving in Canada during that period. It measured 5 by 5 metres (16 ft × 16 ft), was built from local materials, lacks ornamentation found on other buildings in the era, and only includes two rooms, one on the first floor for domestic activity, and a second on the second floor for sleeping quarters. The Harris House was also designed to help keep its occupants warm during the winter, with the house built taller than typical to facilitate the maximum usage of heat from the fireplace on the first floor.

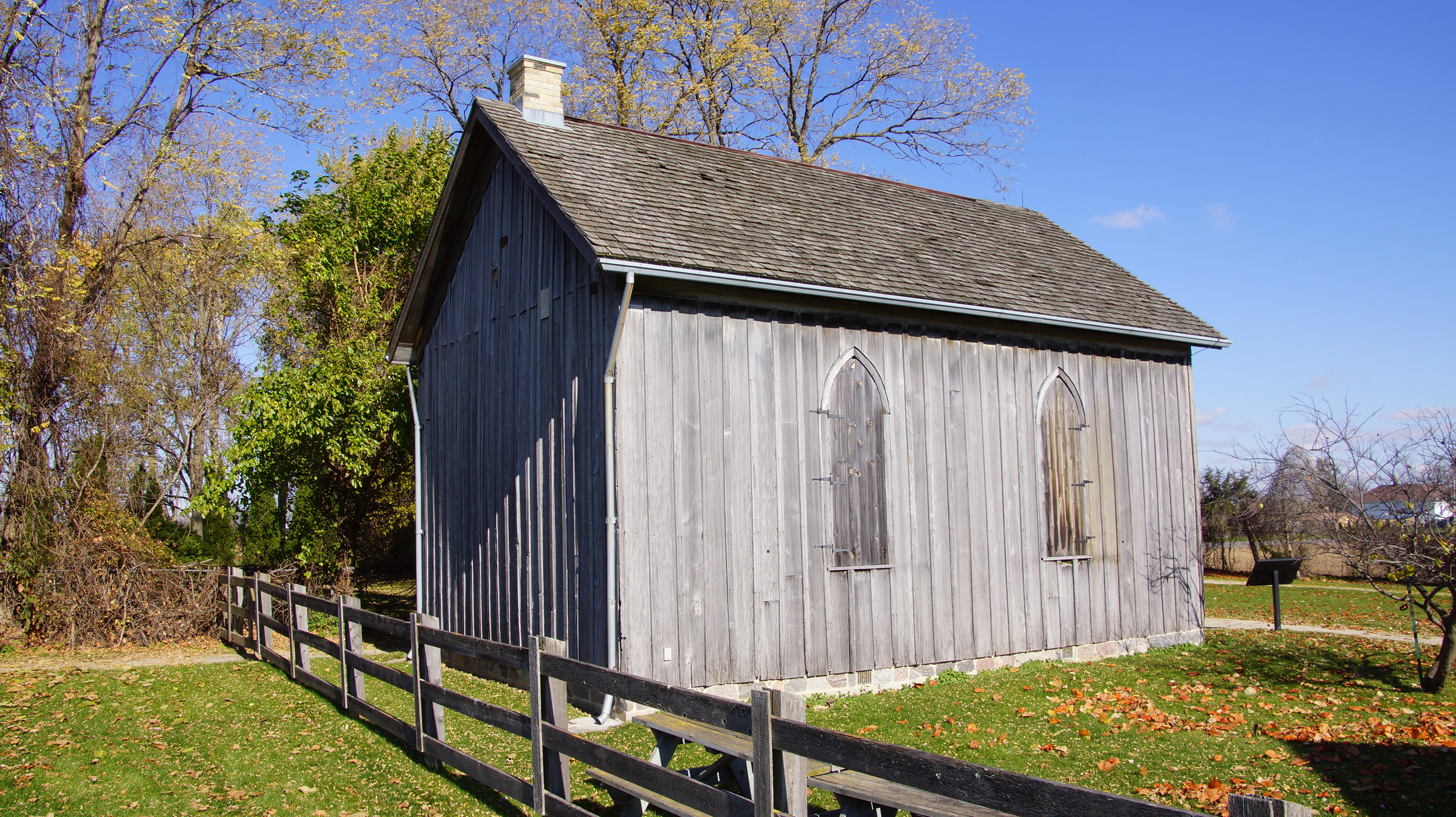
The Pioneer Church is one of three historic buildings on the property recognized by the Ontario Heritage Act.

The third historic building situated on the property is the Pioneer Church, a one-room, single-storey board and batten building designed in a Carpenter Gothic style; typical of churches found in rural Ontario during that period. Although the Pioneer Church dates back to the 1850s, the building was not erected by the inhabitants of the Dawn settlement, and was originally located 70 kilometres (43 mi) away in Wheatley, Ontario as an Anglican and Presbyterian church. The Pioneer Church was moved to the Uncle Tom's Historic Site during the 1960s, in order to provide a visual representation of the original church built in the Dawn settlement. The Pioneer Church was selected by the museum as it closely resembled the original Dawn church in design, material, and size. The original church saw multiple uses in addition to being a church, although it was destroyed in a fire during the early 20th century. However, two objects from the original church were preserved and fitted into the Pioneer Church, the oak pulpit and organ.

== Affiliations ==
The museum is affiliated with several educational and museum organizations in Canada including the Canadian Museums Association, the Canadian Heritage Information Network, and the Virtual Museum of Canada.

== See also ==
- Buxton National Historic Site and Museum
- Chatham Vigilance Committee
- John Freeman Walls Historic Site
- List of museums in Ontario
- Queen's Bush
