= William P. Newman =

Abolitionist and Baptist minister

- Born: 1810/15; Richmond, Virginia, US
- Died: 1866; Cincinnati, Ohio, US
- Occupations: Baptist minister, abolitionist
- Children: 6, including Lucretia Newman Coleman

William P. Newman (1810/15–1866) was a fugitive slave who escaped from Virginia, moved north and obtained an education at Oberlin College. Becoming an ordained Baptist minister, he pastored for a few years at the Union Baptist Church of Cincinnati, Ohio. He made numerous mission trips to Canada, founding schools and preaching. He was known for writing on abolitionist themes. After the Fugitive Slave Act of 1850 passed, he settled his family in Ontario, where they remained until 1859. Leaving Canada, he first immigrated with his family to Haiti, but came into conflict with the Catholicism he found there. After trying to immigrate again to Jamaica, he returned to the United States after the outbreak of the Civil War and re-established his pastorate at the Union Baptist Church. He died in a cholera epidemic in 1866.

== Early life ==
William P. Newman was born as a slave in Williamsburg. Virginia in the period between 1810 and 1815. He escaped and made his way north, arriving at Oberlin College in 1839. From the beginning of his studies, Newman was active in the school, working on behalf of emancipation. He was one of the chosen speakers for the black students at Oberlin and published fiery essays in the black press in favor of the abolition of slavery. He was one of six delegates selected from Lorain County to attend the 1843 State Convention in Columbus and was elected chair of the business committee. He was also said to be one of the first black voters in the county. In 1843, Newman left Oberlin and the following year he married Nancy D. Brown, with whom he would have at least four children, the youngest of whom was Lucretia.

== Career ==
When he left school in 1843, without money to his name, he intended to establish schools in Canada West. By 1844, with the support of the Ohio Ladies' Education Society, (Note: An organization committed to the causes of abolitionism and African-American education.) he was lecturing in Canada, raising funds for the society, and scouting for teachers. By 1848, he returned to Cincinnati to become pastor of the Union Baptist Church, succeeding Rev. Charles Satchell. Newman remained in Cincinnati until the enactment of the Fugitive Slave Act of 1850, when he returned to Canada with his family. They lived in Chatham, Kent County, Ontario, and when Newman was not preaching and teaching, he operated a sawmill at Dawn Mills. In 1855, he helped edit the Provincial Freeman, contributing editorials on politics, the role of religion, and interracial marriage. On August 15 1859, Newman married Sarah Clegget, who became step-mother to his children.

Later in 1859, Newman, with his wife and six children, left Canada (Note: He sold his farm the next year to Thomas Hughes, an Anglican minister recently arrived in Dresden.) and went to Haiti in an attempt to find missionaries interested in working in Africa. Clashing with the Catholic Church in Haiti, Newman moved on to Jamaica before returning to Cincinnati in 1863. In 1864 he served as a delegate to the National Black Convention in Syracuse, New York, and by the end of the year, returned to his pastorate at Union Baptist.

== Death and legacy ==
Newman died in a cholera epidemic in 1866. The church erected a monument to his memory in their new cemetery and gave $1000 to his widow to establish a home near her relatives in Appleton, Wisconsin.
