= Aquakultre =

Canadian soul and R&B musical project

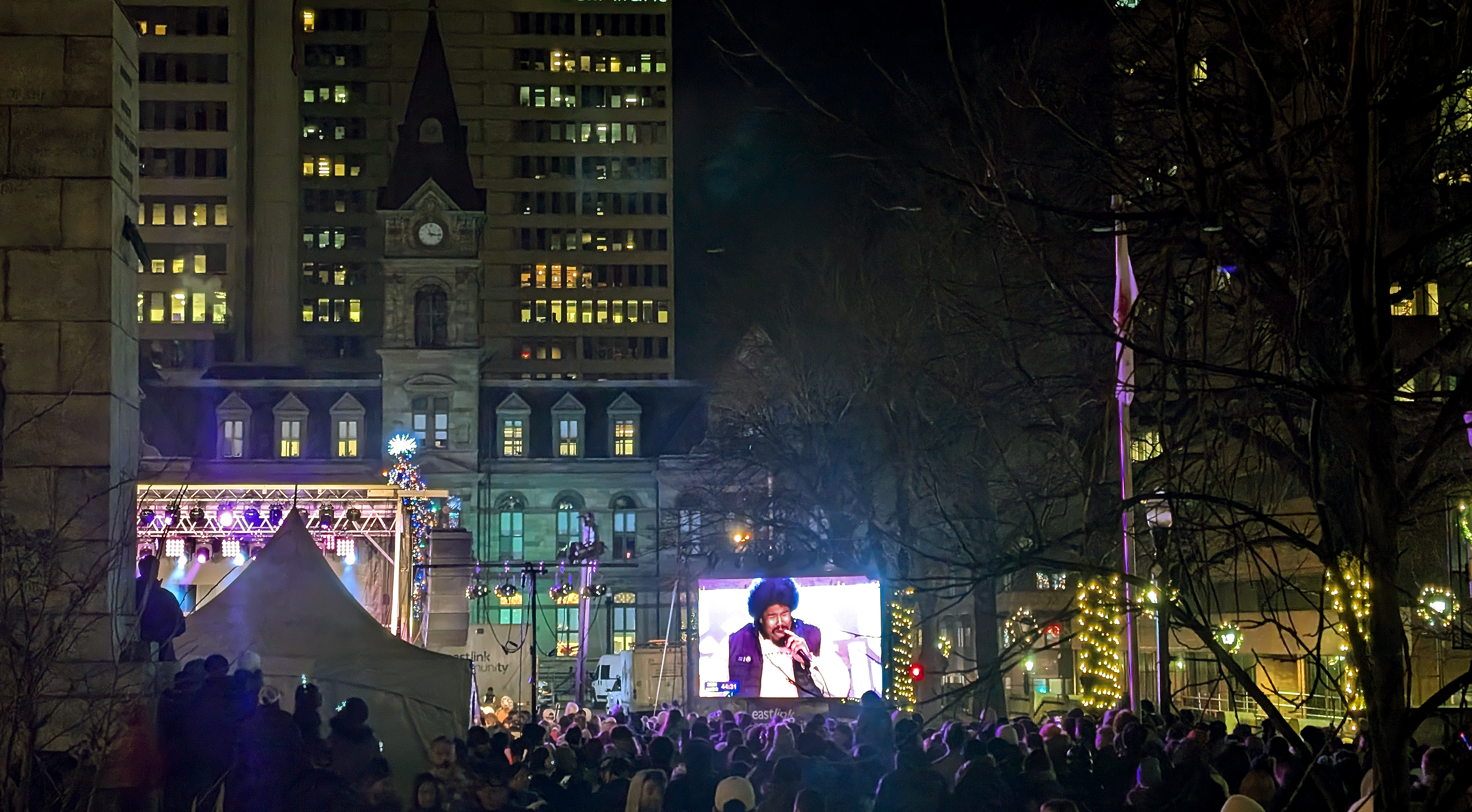
- Aquakultre performing at Grand Parade for New Year's Eve

Background information
- Origin: Halifax, Nova Scotia
- Genres: hip-hop, soul, R&B
- Years active: 2015-
- Label: Forward Music Group
- Website: aquakultre.info

Aquakultre is a Canadian soul and R&B musical project from Halifax, Nova Scotia, whose core member is singer and rapper Lance Sampson.

== Background ==
Sampson traces his ancestry through several historic Black communities including Three Mile Plains, Delaps Cove, and Africville, back to the arrival of the Black Loyalists in 1783. He grew up in the Uniacke Square neighbourhood of Halifax. He is the great-great-grandson of Daniel Perry Sampson, a Halifax resident who was convicted of murder and executed by hanging in 1935, in a case that is now being disputed with new evidence having emerged in the 2020s, in part through Lance's own research, that Daniel likely did not write or sign the confession statement attributed to him.

At 20, he was charged with robbing a taxi driver of his cell phone. He was later found to be in possession of a loaded handgun, crack cocaine and the stolen property. He received a five-year prison sentence, but was released after 19 months. He taught himself to play the guitar while incarcerated after being exposed to the music of Common and Erykah Badu.

== Career ==
Sampson began performing as a rapper and singer in 2015, and in 2018 he won CBC Music's annual Searchlight competition with "Sure", a song he had written in prison.

He recorded Legacy in just seven days at the National Music Centre in Calgary, Alberta, with a band that included Nathan Doucet, Jeremy Costello and Nick Dourado. Following the release of preview singles "Pay It Forward", "I Doubt It" and "Wife Tonight", the album was released in May 2020, independently and through Black Buffalo Records. It was a long-listed nominee for the 2020 Polaris Music Prize.

In August 2020, he announced that his second album Bleeding Gums Murphy, a collaboration with DJ and producer Uncle Fester, would be released on October 9.

His video for "Pay It Forward", directed by Sampson and Evan Elliot, won the Audience Award at the 2021 Prism Prize.

Aquakultre performed on the 2021 FreeUp! The Emancipation Day Special. He contributed vocals for "Summer Night Songs", the title song of the 2021 documentary The North Star: Finding Black Mecca.

His third album, Don't Trip, was released in July 2022 by Forward Music, and was long-listed for the 2023 Polaris Music Prize.

His fourth album,1783, draws on the history of Black Nova Scotians, and was released in February of 2026 by Next Door Records, an imprint of Outside Music. It explores both Black Nova Scotian history and Sampson's own family heritage, including "Gallows", a song written from the perspective of his great-great-grandfather in the final moments before his death. The album was shortlisted for the 2026 Polaris Music Prize, and the songs "Gallows" and "Holy" were long-listed for the SOCAN Polaris Song Prize. On June 24, 2026, Complex Canada ranked 1783 4th in their 10 Best Canadian Albums of 2026 (So Far) list.

Sampson is the creator, director, and host of the documentary television series GeneratioNS: Black Memories of Nova Scotia. The series received two Screen Nova Scotia Award nominations in 2025.

In 2025, Sampson was awarded the Black Artist Recognition Award by Creative Nova Scotia. In November 2025, he was named the Artist-in-Residence at the Black Cultural Centre in Cherry Brook, NS. In July 2026 he was named a recipient of the 2025 Jospeh S. Stauffer Award by the Canada Council for the Arts.
