= Ribble =

Ribble may refer to:

- River Ribble, in North Yorkshire and Lancashire, England
  - Ribble and Alt Estuaries
- River Ribble, West Yorkshire, England
- Ribble Motor Services, a former bus company in North West England
- Ribble Valley, a local government district in Lancashire, England
- Ribble Valley (UK Parliament constituency) in Lancashire, England
- HMS Ribble, a British Royal Navy vessel

== People ==
- Asa Ribble (1841–1911), Canadian sailor and politician
- Dave Ribble (1907–1943), American football player
- Kimberly Ribble (born 1974), Canadian judoka
- Melvin H. Ribble (1870–1964), American jazz musician
- Pat Ribble (born 1954), Canadian ice hockey player
- Reid Ribble (born 1956), American politician, U.S. Representative for Wisconsin from 2011 to 2017
