= Asa Ribble =

Canadian mayor and master mariner

Captain Asa Ribble
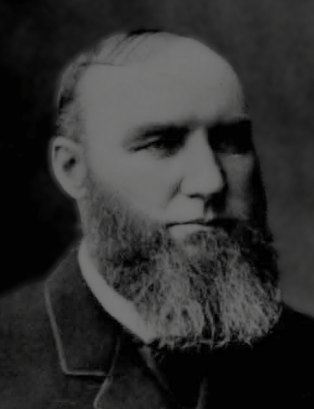
- Photograph of Asa Ribble in a 1904 compilation of biographical sketches

Mayor of Town of Dresden, Ontario
- In office 1889–1890
- Preceded by: R. P. Wright
- Succeeded by: J. W. Sharpe
- In office 1901–1905
- Preceded by: W. G. Cragg
- Succeeded by: J. I. Wiley
- In office 1911
- Preceded by: L. Hughson
- Succeeded by: H. S. McDonald

Personal details
- Born: 27 September 1841 Camden Gore, Ontario
- Died: 30 October 1911 Dresden, Ontario
- Spouses: Sarah King (m. 1861-1866); Marion Samson (m. 1888)
- Children: 4
- Occupation: Master mariner; shipowner; timber merchant

Asa Ribble (1841–1911), a Canadian sailor who attained the rank of captain, served eight terms as mayor of Dresden, Ontario.

== Biography ==
=== Mayor of Dresden, Ontario ===
During his first term in 1889, Ribble oversaw the construction of a new bridge over the Sydenham River, replacing the 1864 original. He was also superintendent of agriculture for the short-lived Dresden Sugar Refining Company, which operated a beet sugar factory. In addition, he was instrumental in establishing, in 1901, Dresden's first vegetable-canning factory. (Note: The vegetable-canning factory was bought by the Canadian Canners company, and since 1947, with many upgrades, has been operated by Conagra.)

=== Master mariner ===
Ribble commanded the steam-powered barge Victoria in 1881. In 1882, he was the master of the "fine new steamer" Byron Trerice, a freighter transporting barrel-staves and cordwood between Detroit and Dresden. Named after the son of its owner, Alexander Trerice, the first mayor of Dresden, it was later refitted to carry passengers.

He became the owner of the fishtug Ariadne in 1901, with his ownership (or that of his estate) recorded in successive editions of the annual "Great Lakes Register". In 1908, Ribble was the master of the passenger-steamer City of Chatham, which plied Lake Erie between Pelee Island, Kingsville, Leamington, Windsor, and Sandusky.

== See also ==
- Dresden, Ontario – Agricultural community in Ontario, Canada
- Great Lakes – Group of lakes in North America
- Steamboat – Boat propelled by steam
