= Bromley Armstrong =

Canadian civil rights leader

- Born: Bromley Lloyd Armstrong; February 9, 1926; Kingston, Jamaica
- Died: August 17, 2018 (aged 92); Toronto, Ontario
- Known for: Civil rights leader
- Awards: Order of Canada; Order of Ontario

Bromley Lloyd Armstrong, CM OOnt (February 9, 1926 – August 17, 2018) was a Canadian civil rights leader. He was active in the nascent civil rights era in Canada, beginning with his arrival in 1947. Armstrong was a committed union activist who worked to improve conditions for workers in industry. He was also active in promoting equal rights for African-Canadians and was involved with the National Unity Association (NUA) in sit-ins in Dresden, Ontario restaurants that refused to serve blacks. Armstrong travelled to Dresden following the activities of Hugh Burnett and the NUA—the NUA had been urging the local town council (unsuccessfully) to create laws that would put an end to discrimination against blacks in the town. In response to delegations to the Ontario Legislature at Queen's Park in the provincial capital of Toronto, in the early 1950s Ontario Premier Leslie Frost brought two laws into place, the Fair Employment Practices Act and the Fair Accommodation Practices Act. The first outlawed discrimination in the workplace, the second outlawed it in businesses that served the public. Enacted in April 1954, the Fair Accommodation Practices Act stated: "No one can deny to any person or class of persons the accommodation, services or facilities usually available to members of the public." The Act triggered the repeal of the largely ineffective Racial Discrimination Act of 1944, which outlawed "the publication or display, on lands, premises, by newspaper or radio, of any notice, sign, symbol, emblem or other representation indicating racial discrimination."

After local Dresden businesses refused to comply with the Fair Accommodation Practices Act the same year it was enacted, Armstrong and other activists from the Toronto-based Joint Labour Committee for Human Rights conducted sit-ins in Dresden restaurants, testing the owners' non-compliance with the law, and then using that information to urge Premier Frost to eventually press charges against the restaurant owners. The owners were taken to court and the law upheld; and was Canada's first successful test of a modern anti-discrimination law. Armstrong figured in the sit-ins, on one occasion calmly demanding service of a bigoted restaurant owner, who was angrily wielding a meat cleaver in his restaurant kitchen.

In 1994, he was made a Member of the Order of Canada.

Armstrong's story is told in his autobiography: Bromley: Tireless Fighter for Just Causes.
