= Ruth Lor Malloy =

Canadian activist and travel writer

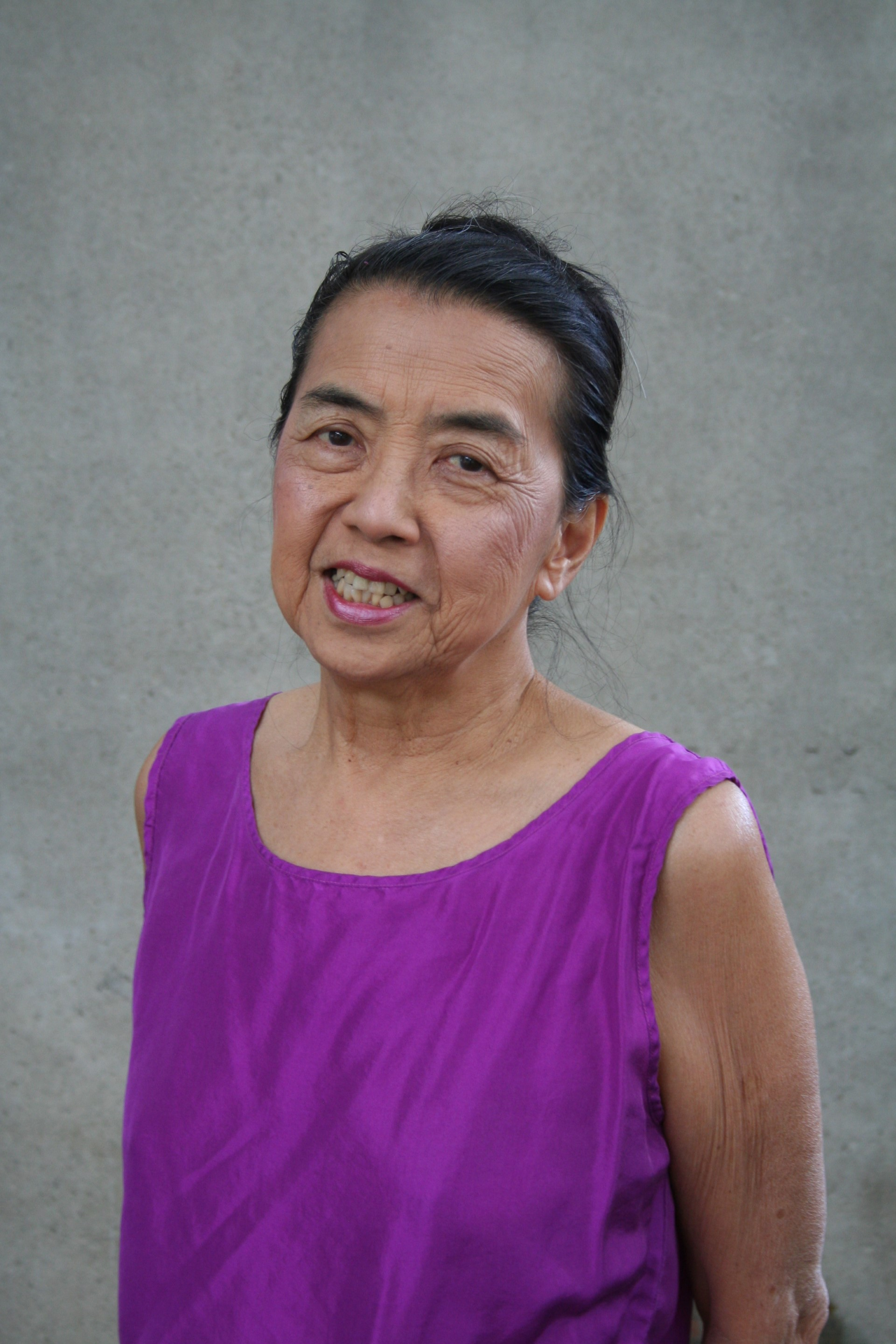
- Born: August 4, 1932 (age 94); Brockville, Ontario, Canada
- Occupations: Activist, journalist, travel writer, photographer
- Spouse: Michael Malloy (m. 1965)
- Children: 3
- Website: www.ruthlormalloy.com

Ruth Lor Malloy (born 4 August, 1932) is a Canadian activist, journalist, travel writer, and photographer.

== Early life and education ==
Ruth Lor was born in Brockville, Ontario, to a Chinese-Canadian family. Her father was born in China and immigrated to Canada in 1909, at age 12. She grew up attending a Presbyterian church.

Lor frequently experienced racial discrimination growing up.

Lor attended Victoria College at the University of Toronto, graduating in 1954.

== Life ==
While in college, Lor became involved with student activism. She played a significant role in the highly publicized Dresden, Ontario restaurant sit-in of 1954. The protest brought attention to racist attitudes among local restaurant owners, as many still refused to serve non-white patrons despite racial discrimination being illegal in the province.

After graduating college, Lor visited Washington, D.C., where she learned pacifist methods of protest and resistance and pursued a career in journalism.

In 1958, she and a delegation of Chinese and Japanese Canadian activists went to Ottawa to petition Minister of Immigration Ellen Fairclough about Canada's restrictions on Chinese immigration.

By the 1960s, Malloy was associated with the Society of Friends, having become a Quaker after working at a Quaker camp in Mexico.

In 1963, Lor met Michael Malloy, a journalist from Chicago, while she was volunteering in India with the American Friends Service Committee. In 1965, Lor married Malloy in Hong Kong. The couple lived in Saigon, where Michael worked as a foreign correspondent. That year, she also visited China for the first time. She wrote a series of columns about life in Vietnam and her first trip to China for the Windsor Star. In 1966, she spoke with the South Vietnamese grassroots Movement for National Self-Determination.

In 1973, she wrote and published the first English-language guidebook to China in North America. She went on to write numerous other travel books about the country. After the end of the Vietnam War, Malloy and her husband hosted Vietnamese refugees in their home in Maryland. In 1997, she and other volunteers wrote a booklet for the hijras, a minority gender group in India.

In 2023, Barclay Press published her book Brightening My Corner a Memoir of Dreams Fulfilled and York University gave her an honorary doctorate for her "tireless efforts to combat discrimination and promote equality in Canada and beyond".

== Personal life ==
Malloy and her husband, Michael Malloy (d. 2021), had three children.

== Publications ==
- Malloy, Ruth Lor (1973). A Guide to the People's Republic of China for Travelers of Chinese Ancestry.
- Malloy, Ruth Lor (1980). Travel Guide to the People's Republic of China. Morrow. ISBN 978-0-688-08690-9.
- Malloy, Ruth Lor; Hsu, Priscilla Liang (1987). Fielding's People's Republic of China, 1987. W. Morrow. ISBN 978-0-688-05879-1.
- Malloy, Ruth Lor (1992). Fielding's People's Republic of China 1992. Fielding Travel Books. ISBN 978-0-688-10163-3.
- Walker, Caroline; Shipley, Robert; Malloy, Ruth Lor; Fu, Kailin (1993-05-05). On Leaving Bai Di Cheng: The Culture of China's Yangzi Gorges. Dundurn. ISBN 978-1-55021-083-5.
- Malloy, Ruth Lor (November 1988). Fielding's People's Republic of China, 1989. HarperCollins Publishers. ISBN 978-0-688-07621-4.
- Malloy, Ruth Lor (1999). China Guide: Be a Traveler, Not a Tourist!. Open Road Publishing. ISBN 978-1-892975-01-0.
- Malloy, Ruth Lor (2023). Brightening My Corner A Memoir of Dreams Fulfilled. Barclay Press. ISBN 978-1-59498-032-9.
- Malloy, Ruth Lor (2023). Hijras Who We are: a First Person Account of India's Little Known Eunuchs. Ruth Lor Malloy. ISBN 978-1-7381782-1-6.
