= Sarnia Subdivision =

Railway line in Ontario, Canada

The Sarnia Subdivision is a railroad line owned by the Lake Erie and Detroit River Railway and operated by CSX Transportation in the Canadian province of Ontario. The line runs from Chatham north to Sarnia along a former Pere Marquette Railway line. From its north end, CSX has trackage rights west over the Canadian National Railway's Strathroy Subdivision (through the St. Clair Tunnel) and the Grand Trunk Western Railroad's Flint Subdivision to the CSX Port Huron Subdivision near Port Huron, Michigan, and the Saginaw Subdivision in Flint.

== History ==
The line was built in the 1880s as the Erie and Huron Railway, linking Lake Erie at Erieau with Lake Huron at Sarnia. Through leases and mergers, it became consecutively part of the Pere Marquette Railway, Chesapeake and Ohio Railway and then CSX. The portion from Lake Erie to Blenheim has been abandoned; in 2006, CSX sold the line between Blenheim and Chatham to the Canadian National Railway, who operates it as their Sarnia Spur.
