= British-American Institute =

Vocational school founded by Josiah Henson

Coordinates: 42°35′00″N 82°11′50″W

The British-American Institute of Science and Industry was a school started in 1842 by Josiah Henson near Dresden, Canada West, as part of the Dawn Settlement, a community of freedmen and fugitive slaves. The institute was a school for all ages designed to provide a general education and teacher training. For a short period it was a manual labour school. It was taken over by the British and Foreign Anti-Slavery Society in 1849. The school closed in 1868. Its site is now encompassed by the Josiah Henson Museum of African-Canadian History (formerly Uncle Tom's Cabin Historic Site).The British-American Institute also served as a model for subsequent Black-led educational efforts in Canada, including the community-based Dawn Settlement School and the Chatham Mission School. Its curriculum combined classical education with vocational training, and the school played a key role in shaping early Black Canadian intellectual and social leadership. The British American Institute was a pioneering Black Canadian educational institution founded in 1842 in Dresden, Ontario, by Josiah Henson as part of the Dawn Settlement. It was one of the first vocational schools in Canada to serve formerly enslaved African Americans and their descendants who had fled the United States via the Underground Railroad. The school offered both general academic instruction and practical training in agriculture and trades. It was briefly operated by the British and Foreign Anti-Slavery Society before its closure in 1868. The institute laid the foundation for later Black-led educational efforts in Ontario, and its legacy is now preserved through the Josiah Henson Museum of African-Canadian History.
