= Factory automation infrastructure =

Incorporation of automation in manufacturing

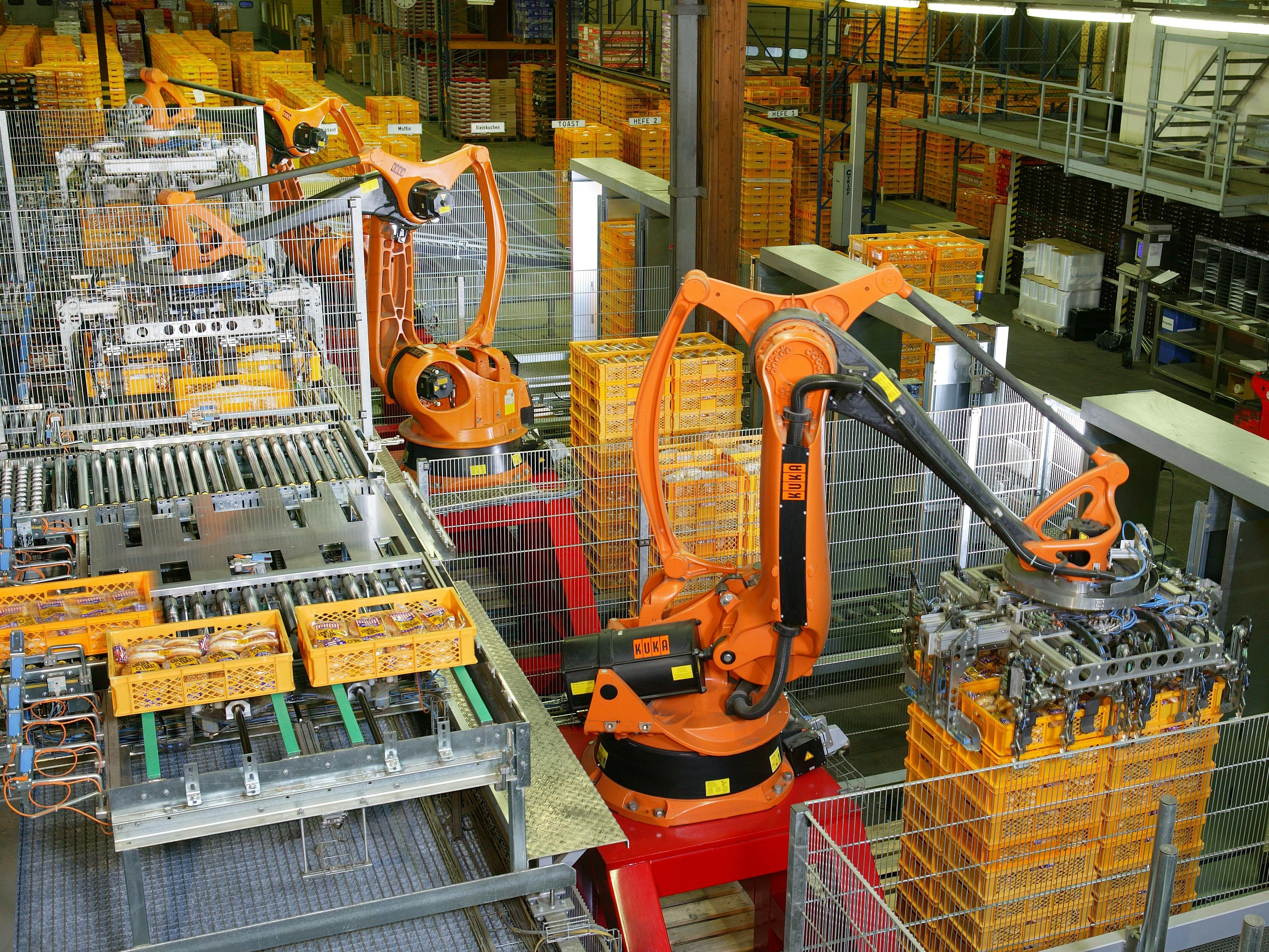
Factory automation with industrial robots for palletizing food products like bread and toast at a bakery in Germany.

Factory automation infrastructure describes the process of incorporating automation into the manufacturing environment and processing input goods into final products. Factory automation intends to decrease risks associated with laborious and dangerous work faced by human workers.

The manufacturing environment is defined by its ability to manufacture and/or assemble goods by machines, integrated assembly lines, and robotic arms. Automated environments are also defined by their coordination with (and usually their systematic integration with) the required automatic equipment to form a complete system.

== Automation ==
Automation has produced sophisticated parts with similar or higher output qualities with minor quality fluctuation. It also can help cut overall manufacturing costs and create safer working environments for workers.

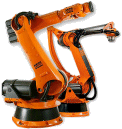
6-axis articulated robots from KUKA

The use of automation in manufacturing started by using technologies such as pneumatic and hydraulic systems in applications where their mechanical advantages could be used to raise output quality and efficiency in production. Complex and highly integrated systems have since evolved, composed of procedures with sophisticated operation drivers. These drivers often are running languages that support 6, 7, and 8-axis controls for sophisticated robotics.

== Robotic arm ==
A robotic arm is a type of mechanical arm, usually programmable, with functions similar to a human arm; the arm may be the total of the mechanism or may be part of a more complex robot. The links of such a manipulator are connected by joints allowing either rotational motion (such as in an articulated robot) or transnational (linear) displacement. The links of the manipulator can be considered to form a kinematic chain. The terminus of the kinematic chain of the manipulator is called the end effector and is analogous to the human hand.
