= Black Abolitionist Papers Project =

Archival research project

The Black Abolitionist Papers Project was an archival research project conducted to document the work of Black abolitionists in the United States. The project was supported by the National Endowment for the Humanities from 1976 to 1992. The project ultimately resulted in the Black Abolitionist Papers collection at the US National Archives and Records Administration.

== Bibliography ==
- Ripley, C. Peter, ed. The Black Abolitionist Papers: Volume I: The British Isles, 1830–1865 (U North Carolina Press, 1985) online
- Ripley, C. Peter, ed. The Black Abolitionist Papers: Volume II: Canada, 18830–1865 (1985) online
- Ripley, C. Peter, ed. The Black Abolitionist Papers. Volume III: The United States, 1830-1846 (1991)
  - The Black Abolitionist Papers, Volume IV: The United States, 1847-1858 (1991)
  - The Black Abolitionist Papers, Volume V: The United States, 1859-1865 (1992)

== See also ==
- List of African-American abolitionists
