= Hugh Burnett =

Canadian activist

Hugh Burnett (July 14, 1918 – September 29, 1991) was an African-Canadian carpenter and civil rights leader. A descendant of slaves, who came to Canada via the Underground Railroad, Hugh Burnett was a carpenter in the rural Canadian town of Dresden, Ontario. He was active in the National Unity Association, an anti-discrimination group which he co-founded; formed in 1948. At the time, Black people in Dresden and other Ontario towns were regularly refused service in restaurants, barber shops and stores.

== History ==
Burnett was born on July 14, 1918, on a farm outside of Dresden, Ontario, to Robert and Myrtle Burnett.

As a Black man, Burnett was subjected to racism. He was discriminated against for the first time when he was sixteen. After a white motorist ran out of gas, Burnett helped the man. The motorist insisted on going to lunch with him in Dresden. Despite being accompanied by the white motorist, Burnett was refused service. He was angered by being refused service and dedicated himself to fighting racism within Dresden.

Another discriminatory incident happened in 1943, when he was 25 years old. After fighting in World War II, he was discharged from the Canadian Army for medical reasons. At the time, Burnett lived in Windsor and worked for the Ford Motor Company. He visited Dresden to see family. While in Dresden, he went to a restaurant in his army uniform and was refused service. Following the incident, he wrote to the federal Minister of Justice, Louis St. Laurent, to say that there was no law against racial discrimination in Canada.

In his fight against discrimination, Burnett, a plain-spoken, determined activist, engaged the support of Toronto-based groups such as the Joint Labour Committee on Human Rights, whose members included Donna Hill (wife of activist Daniel Hill and mother of author Lawrence Hill and singer Dan Hill) and prominent labour activist Bromley Armstrong. Delegations to Ontario Premier Leslie Frost in the early 1950s resulted in the passage of two acts to outlaw discrimination in the province: the Fair Employment Practices Act (outlawing workplace discrimination) and the Fair Accommodation Practices Act (making discrimination illegal in restaurants, stores, and other public-access areas). Despite these laws, people in the town continued to practice discrimination. The life of Burnett's school-age daughter, Patricia, was threatened.

Under Burnett's direction, in 1954, the NUA staged sit-ins of two restaurants that flouted the law, forcing a court challenge that resulted in victory for the NUA and bringing a legal end to overt discrimination in the province. Despite the victory, Burnett was forced to leave town after citizens boycotted his carpentry business. He moved to London, Ontario, continuing his carpentry business under a low profile. Burnett died on September 29, 1991, at age 73.

== Legacy ==
On July 31, 2010, the Ontario Heritage Trust unveiled a plaque commemorating the contributions of Hugh Burnett and the National Unity Association to the civil rights movement in Canada. It stands on the main street of Dresden, at the corner of St. George and St. John Streets, near the restaurant that refused Burnett service. The Dresden plaque reads:

Hugh Burnett and the National Unity Association: Between 1948 and 1956, the National Unity Association (NUA) of Chatham, Dresden and North Buxton, under the leadership of Hugh R. Burnett, waged a campaign for racial equality and social justice. Their efforts led to the passage of Ontario's Fair Accommodation Practices Act (1954), and laid the groundwork for subsequent human rights legislation in Ontario and across Canada. Traditional Anglo-Canadian rights, such as freedom of association and freedom of commerce, had historically been interpreted to permit discrimination on grounds of race, colour or creed in providing services to the public. The NUA inspired recognition of freedom from discrimination as a fundamental principle; this led to a revolutionary change in the course of Canadian law and Canadian history. Hugh Burnett and the NUA were early pioneers in the articulations of equality rights for all Canadians, now constitutionally inscribed in the "Charter of Rights and Freedoms.

Burnett's story is told in the book "Season of Rage: Hugh Burnett and the Struggle for Civil Rights".
