= Delaps Cove =

Community in Nova Scotia, Canada

Coordinates: 44°45′50.55″N 65°38′13.67″W

Delap's Cove in Nova Scotia

Delaps Cove is a community in the Canadian province of Nova Scotia, located in Annapolis County. It is on the shore of the Bay of Fundy by a cove of the same name.
