= Sydenham River (Lake St. Clair) =

Coordinates: 42.58683°N 82.22460°W

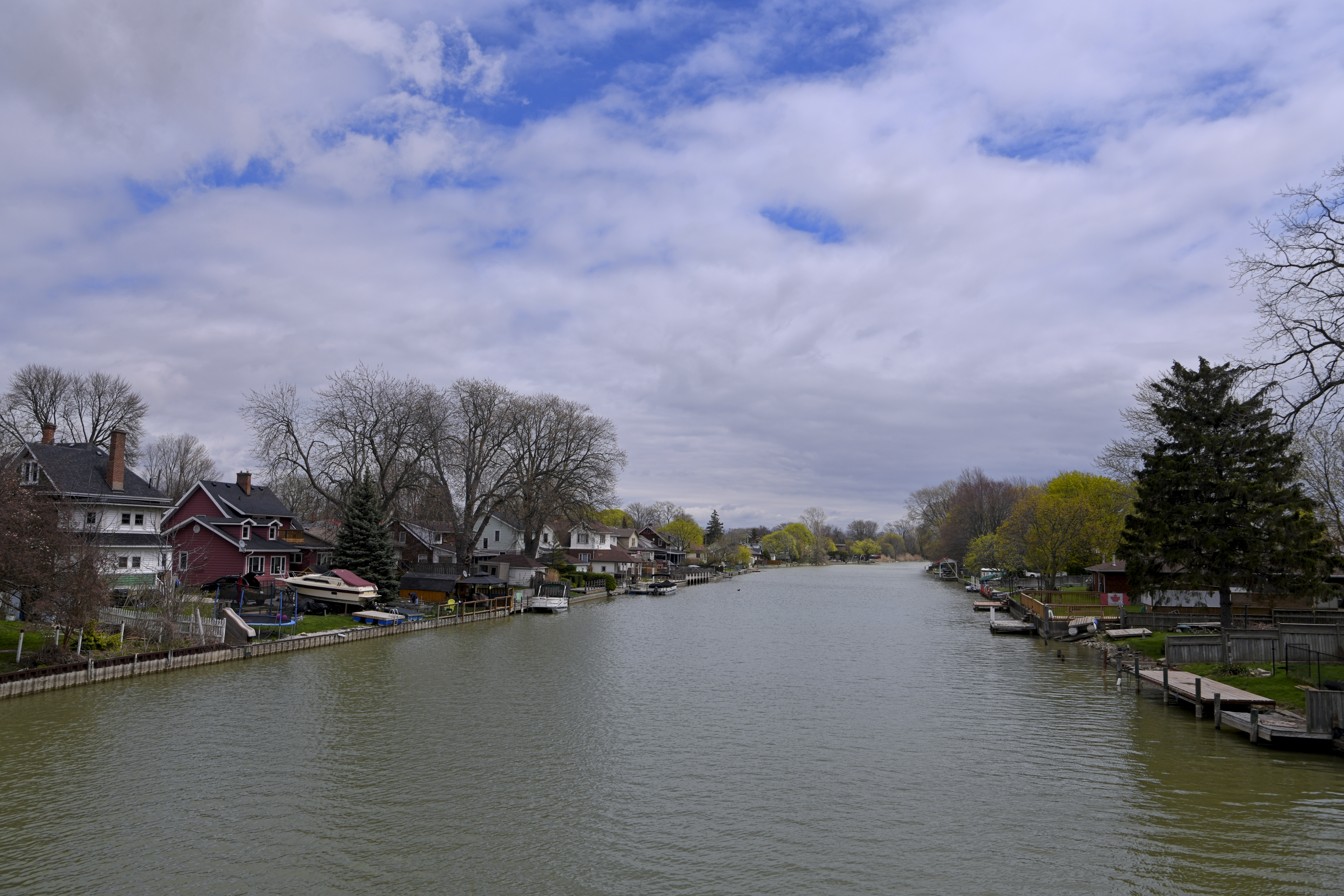
- Sydenham River in Wallaceburg, Ontario

Location
- Country: Canada
- Province: Ontario
- Region: Southwestern Ontario
- Municipalities: Chatham-Kent; Saint Clair

Physical characteristics
- Source: St. Clair River
  - location: Saint Clair
- Mouth: Lake St. Clair
  - location: Chatham-Kent

Basin features
- River system: Great Lakes Basin
- Tributaries
  - left: Sydenham River

The Sydenham River is a river in Chatham-Kent, Lambton County and Middlesex County in southwestern Ontario, Canada, flowing southwest from its source west of London, Ontario and emptying into Lake Saint Clair. The length of the river is 165 kilometres (103 mi) and it drains a watershed of approximately 2,700 square kilometres (1,000 mi^{2}), making it one of the largest river flowing into the St.Clair on the Canadian side. The river flows through the towns of Strathroy and Wallaceburg. It was named after Lord Sydenham, governor of Canada from 1839 to 1841.

Unusual concretions, composed of calcite, can be found near this river. These are known as "kettles" because they resemble the bottom of a large kettle.

The river has been identified as a key biodiversity area.

== Fish species ==
Because this river flows through a large agricultural area, its waters collect silt and fertilizer runoff. In spite of this, the river provides habitat for 80 fish species and 34 species of freshwater mussels, including nine species considered as "endangered" nationally:

- Mudpuppy mussel (Simpsonaias ambigua)
- Northern riffleshell (Epioblasma torulosa rangiana)
- Rayed bean (Villosa fabalis)
- Wavy-rayed lampmussel (Lampsilis fasciola)
- Snuffbox (Epioblasma triquetra)
- Round pigtoe (Pleurobema sintoxia)
- Kidneyshell (Ptychobranchus fasciolaris)
- Round hickorynut (Obovaria subrotunda)
- Rainbow mussel (Villosa iris)

Two fish species and one turtle subspecies considered to be "threatened":

- Spotted gar (Lepisosteus oculatus)
- Eastern sand darter (Ammocrypta pellucida)
- Eastern spiny softshell turtle (Trionyx spiniferus spiniferus)

The Northern madtom (Noturus stigmosus), once found in the river, is considered to be "likely extirpated".

== See also ==
- List of Ontario rivers
