= Dawn Mills, Ontario =

Dawn Mills
- Unincorporated community
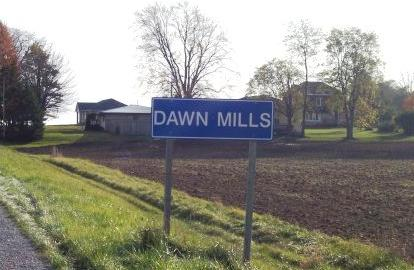

- Location within Municipality of Chatham-Kent Location within Southern Ontario
- Coordinates: 42°35′5″N 82°7′46″W
- Country: Canada
- Province: Ontario
- Municipality: Chatham-Kent
- Settled: 1837
- Time zone: UTC-5 (EST)
  - Summer (DST): UTC-4 (EDT)
- Forward sortation area: N0P 1M0
- Area codes: 519 and 226
- NTS Map: 040J09
- GNBC Code: FAVQC

Dawn Mills is an unincorporated community in Chatham-Kent, Ontario, Canada.

== History ==
In 1880, Dawn Mills had a general store, hotel, combined grist and saw mill, and population of approximately 100.
