= 1833 Boston mayoral election =

Election in Massachusetts, United States

- December 9, 1833
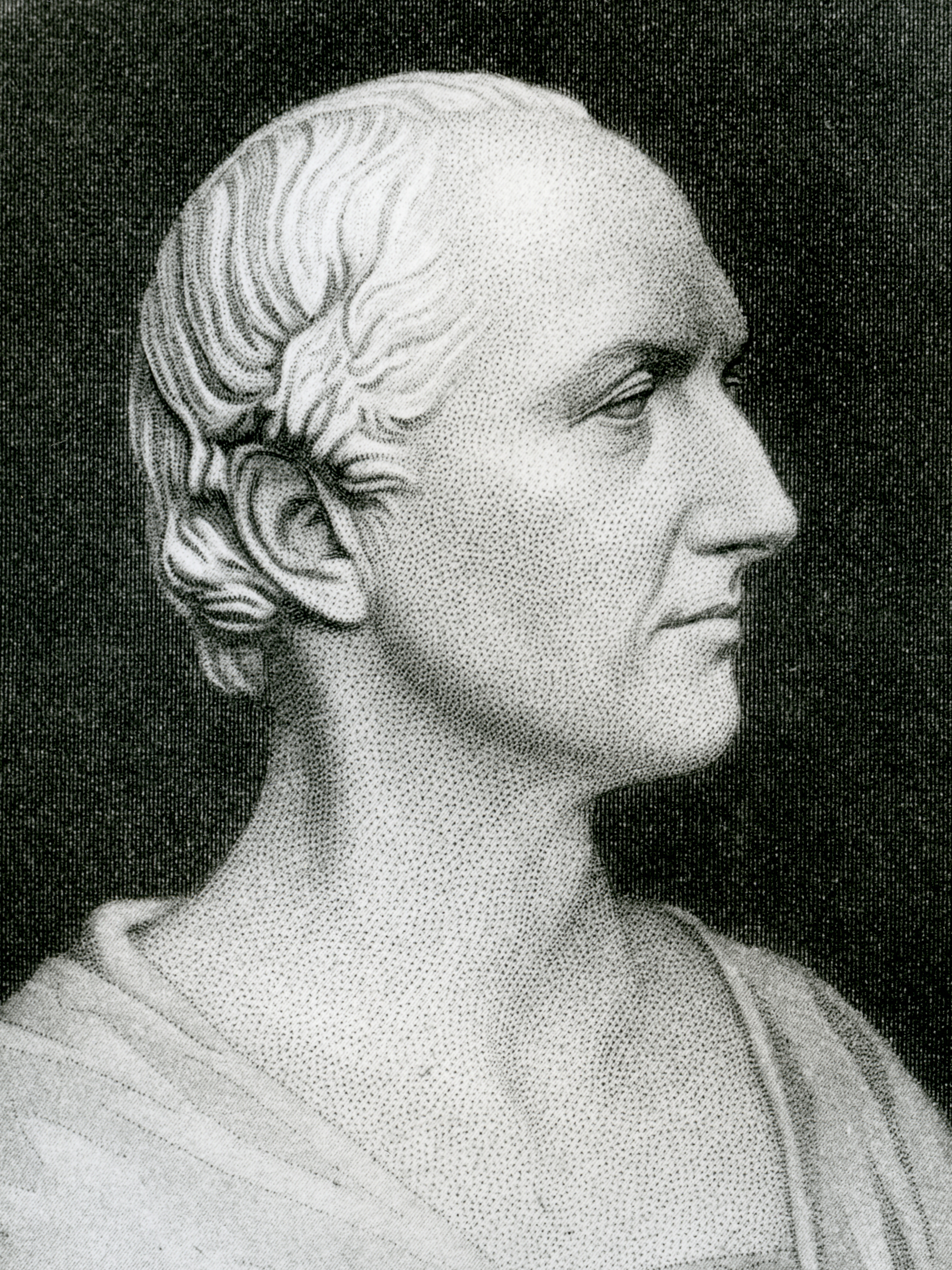

Candidate	Theodore Lyman II	William Sullivan
Party	Democratic	National Republican
Popular vote	3,734	2,009
Percentage	59.83%	32.19%
Mayor before election
Charles Wells
Elected mayor
Theodore Lyman II
Democratic

The 1833 Boston mayoral election saw the election of Theodore Lyman II. It was held on December 9, 1833. Incumbent mayor Charles Wells was not a nominee for reelection.

== Candidate ==
Lyman was the first Democrat to win election as mayor of Boston. His opponent was National Republican Party nominee William Sullivan.

- Theodore Lyman II, 1831 and 1832 mayoral candidate
- William Sullivan (National Republican Party), 1831 mayoral candidate

== Campaign ==
Lyman's victory in the election was expected by The Boston Post, with the newspaper writing,

The honorable and unobjectionable manner in which General Lyman's nomination took place, his peculiar fitness for the station and just popularity, are circumstances which will break the shackles of National Republicanism and secure his election.

== Results ==
1833 Boston mayoral election
Party	Candidate	Votes	%
Democratic	Theodore Lyman II	3,734	59.83
National Republican	William Sullivan	2,009	32.19
Scattering	Other	498	7.98
Total votes		6,241	100

== See also ==
- List of mayors of Boston, Massachusetts
