= Stephen Higginson (Continental Congress) =

American politician (1743–1828)

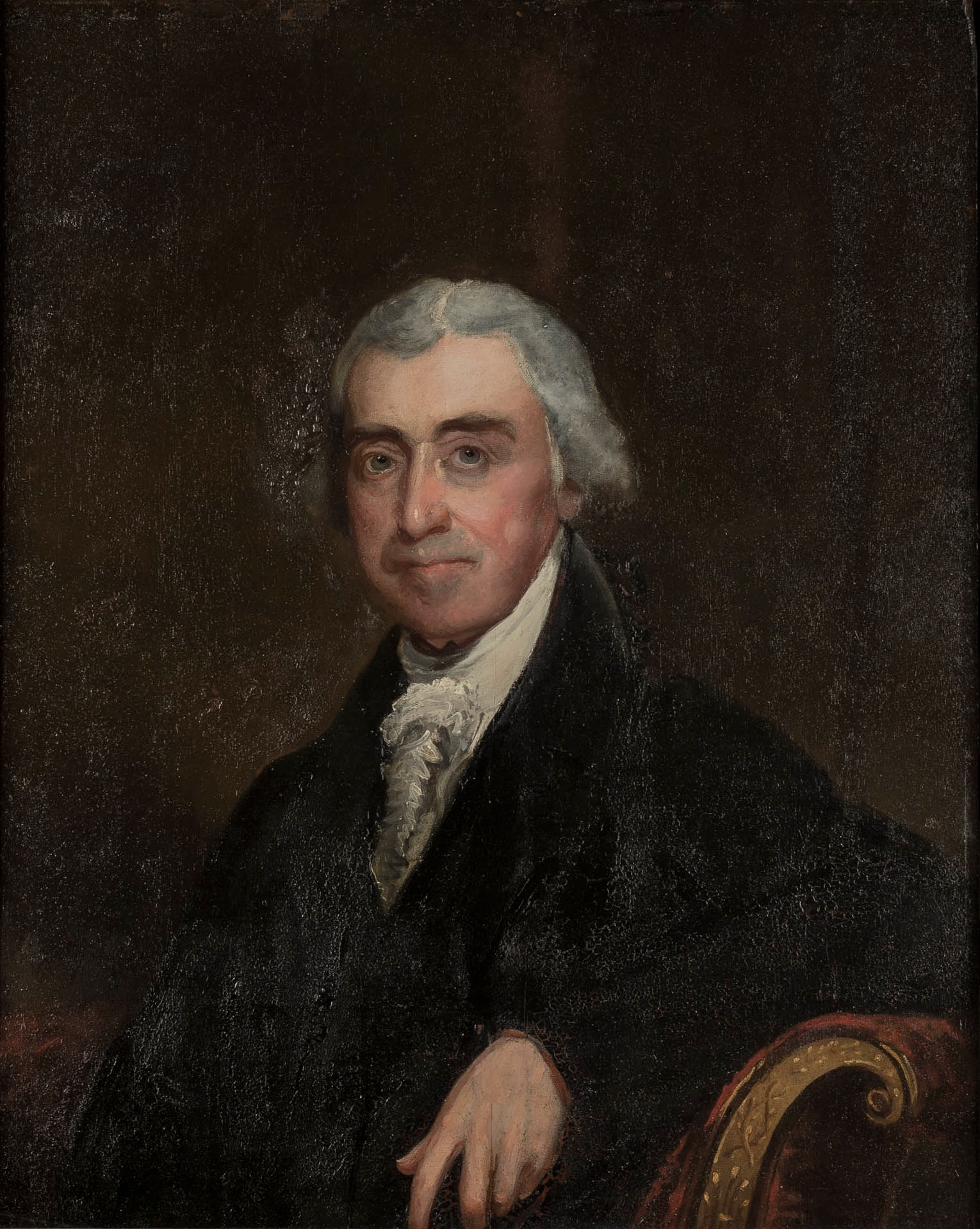
- Portrait by Gilbert Stuart

Member of the Second Continental Congress
- In office 1783

Personal details
- Born: November 28, 1743 Salem, Province of Massachusetts Bay
- Died: November 28, 1828 (aged 85) Boston, Massachusetts, U.S.
- Resting place: Central Burying Ground
- Party: Federalist
- Spouses: Susanna Cleveland (m. 1764–1788) Elizabeth Perkins (m. 1789, died) Sarah Perkins (m. 1792)
- Relatives: George Cabot (cousin); Francis Higginson (great-great-great-grandfather)

Stephen Higginson (November 28, 1743 – November 28, 1828) was an American merchant and shipmaster from Boston, Massachusetts. He was a delegate for Massachusetts to the Continental Congress in 1783. He took an active part in suppressing Shays' Rebellion, was the author of the Laco letters (1789), and served the United States government as navy agent from May 11 to June 22, 1798. Although he was a privateer during the American Revolutionary War he became a "blue light", extreme-Federalist during the War of 1812 and was one of the members of the Essex Junto.

== Early life ==
Stephen Higginson was born on November 28, 1743, in Salem, Massachusetts, to Elizabeth (née Cabot) and Stephen Higginson. He attended common schools in Salem. He began work as a merchant in the counting room of Deacon Smith of Boston. His great-great-great-grandfather was reverend Francis Higginson. His double first cousin was George Cabot.

== Career ==
Higginson worked in mercantile and was a shipmaster from 1765 to 1775. In 1778, he moved from Salem to Boston to become a partner with Jonathan Jackson. He served in the Massachusetts legislature in 1782 and was a delegate for Massachusetts to the Continental Congress in 1783. Along with his fellow Massachusetts delegates Holten and Gorham, he signed a protest against the denial of Elbridge Gerry's right in calling for ayes and nays. He was part of a group of Federalists called the Essex Junto, which included his cousin George Cabot and Theophilus Parsons. He was the author of the Laco letters in February and March 1789. He became justice of the peace in Massachusetts in 1782 and of the Quorum in 1788.

In February 1784, he became a director of a bank in Boston led by Governor James Bowdoin. Higginson served as a naval officer at the Port of Boston from 1797 to 1808. He took an active part in suppressing Shays' Rebellion and served as lieutenant colonel in the Boston regiment.

== Personal life ==
Higginson married Susanna "Susan" Cleveland, a second cousin and daughter of Aaron Cleveland, on October 20, 1764. They had a son, John. After marrying, they moved to a home at the corner of Main and Central streets in Salem. His wife died in 1788. He married Elizabeth Perkins, daughter of an English merchant, on May 15, 1789. They had one son, James Perkins. His second wife died and he married again in September 1792 to Sarah Perkins, sister of his former wife. He lived at 10 Gower Street in London in 1800 and lived in England from 1806 to 1812 and in 1818.

Higginson died on November 28, 1828, in Boston. He was buried in the Central Burying Ground in Boston.
