= Theodore Lyman II =

American philanthropist, politician, and author

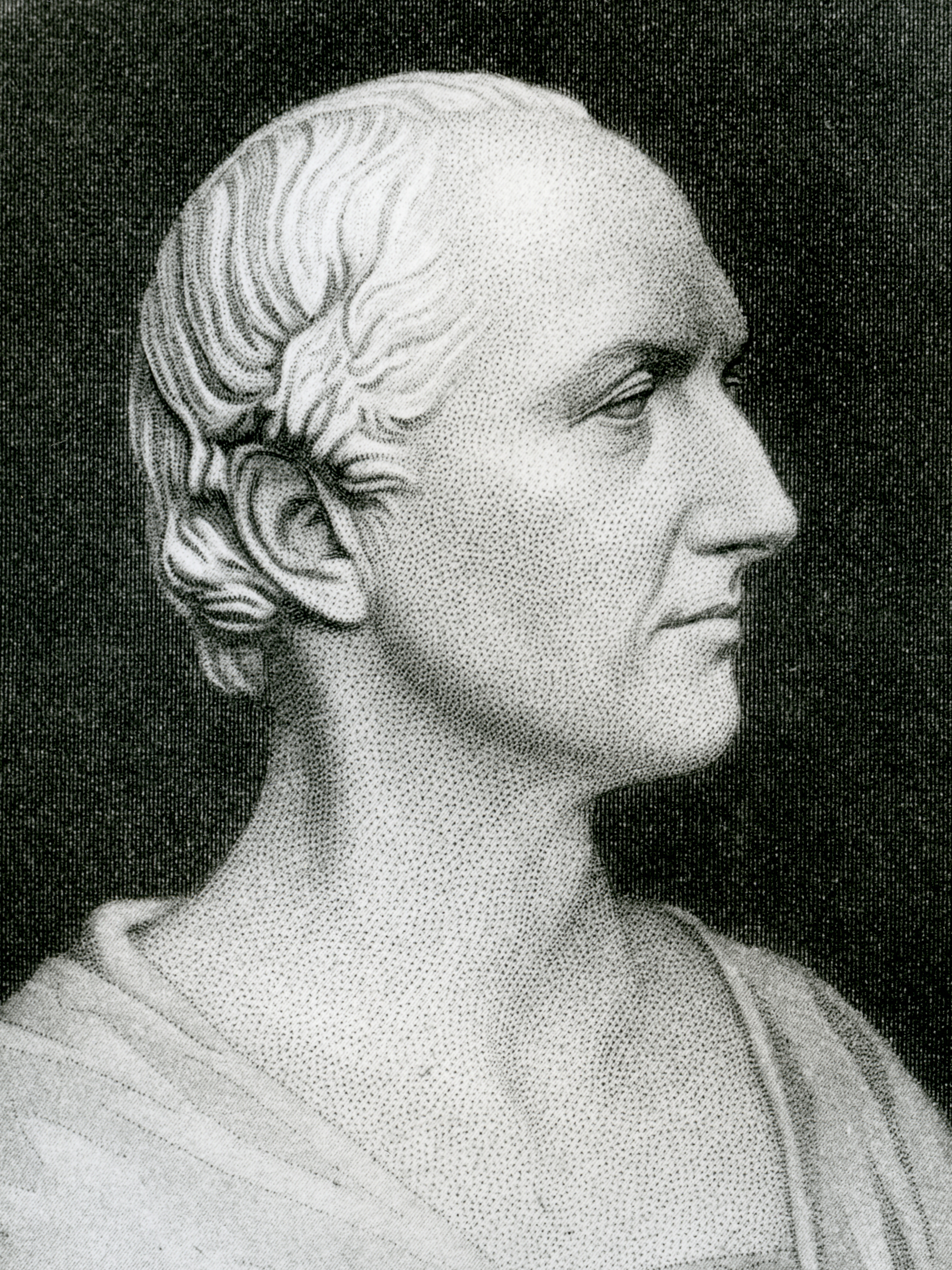

5th Mayor of Boston, Massachusetts
- In office 1834–1836
- Preceded by: Charles Wells
- Succeeded by: Samuel T. Armstrong

Personal details
- Born: September 20, 1792 Boston, Massachusetts
- Died: July 18, 1849 (aged 56) Brookline, Massachusetts
- Party: Democratic and Working Men's
- Relations: George W. Lyman (brother)
- Children: Theodore Lyman III
- Parent: Theodore Lyman I (father)
- Education: Harvard University

Theodore Lyman II (September 20, 1792 – July 18, 1849) was an American philanthropist, politician, and author, born in Boston, the son of Theodore Lyman I and Lydia Pickering Williams. He graduated from Harvard University in 1810, visited Europe (1812–14), studied law, and with Edward Everett, revisited Europe in 1817–19. From 1819 to 1822 he was an aide to John Brooks, the Governor of Massachusetts. He became brigadier general of militia in 1823, and from 1820 to 1825 he served in the Massachusetts General Court.

== Mayor of Boston ==
In 1833 Lyman defeated William Sullivan, the Whig candidate, and was elected the first Democratic Mayor of Boston. He served for two years from January 1834 through January 1836. Lyman was such a popular mayor that when he ran for reelection he was nominated by the Whigs.

== Views on slavery and equality ==
As Mayor of Boston, Lyman had to keep the peace between radical abolitionists and industrialists who feared anti-slavery agitators would cause southern plantation owners to cut ties with the northern mills and merchants. In August 1835 he presided over an anti-abolition meeting in Boston. A few weeks later, during an anti-abolitionist riot, he rescued William Lloyd Garrison from the mob and confined him to jail to save his life.

Lyman was a benefactor of the Massachusetts Horticultural Society and of the Farm School and was the founder of the State Reform School for Boys, a reform school in Westborough, to which he gave $72,000.

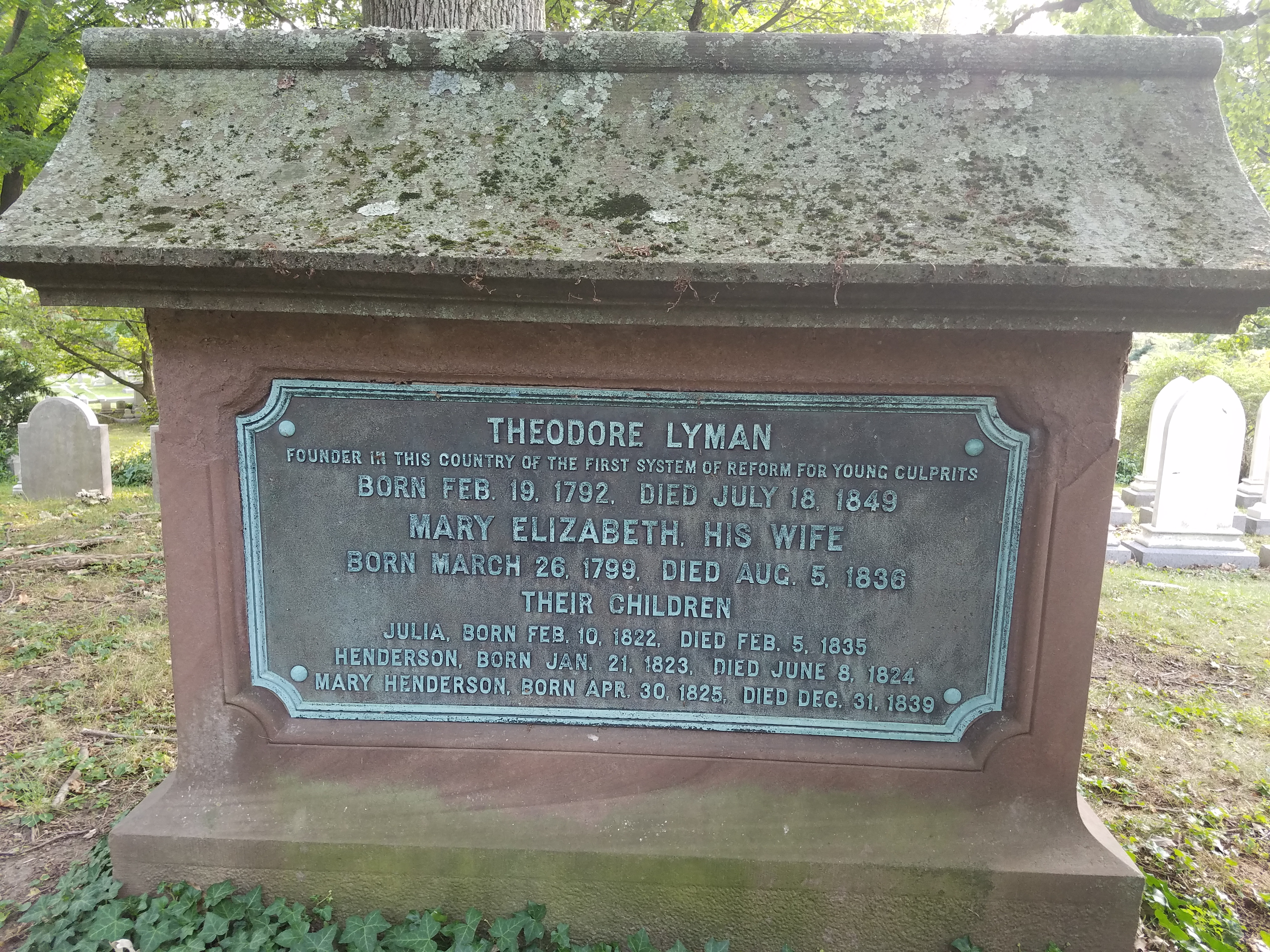
Grave of Theodore Lyman, Mt. Auburn Cemetery

== Writings ==
- Three Weeks in Paris (1814)
- The Political State of Italy (1820)
- Account of the Hartford Convention (1823); in which he defended those who were concerned in that convention as an expression of harbored hatred for both Presidents, John Adams and J.Q. Adams. (SEE Essex Junto)
- The Diplomacy of the United States with Foreign Nations (1828); a work which is still valuable for the period covered.

== See also ==
- 1830 Boston mayoral election –lost
- 1831 Boston mayoral election –lost
- 1832 Boston mayoral election –lost
- 1833 Boston mayoral election –won
- 1834 Boston mayoral election –won
- 1837 Boston mayoral election –lost
- Timeline of Boston, 1830s

== Footnotes ==
Political offices
Preceded by Charles Wells	Mayor of Boston, Massachusetts; 1834–1836	Succeeded by Samuel T. Armstrong
