= 1834 Boston mayoral election =

Election in Massachusetts, United States

- December 8, 1834
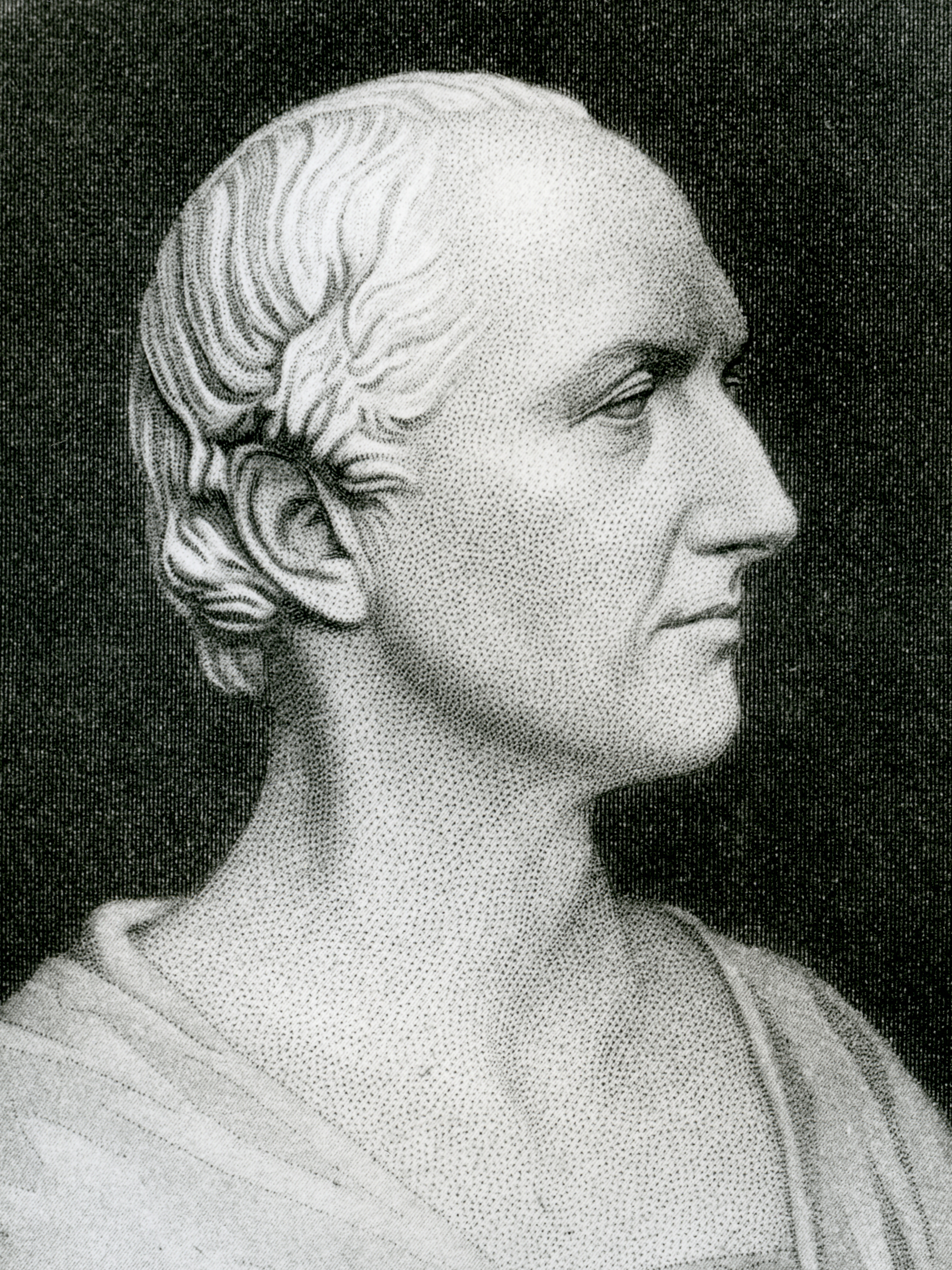
Candidate	Theodore Lyman II
Party	Democratic
Alliance	Whig; Grocer's
Popular vote	4,261
Percentage	96.75%
Mayor before election
Theodore Lyman II
Democratic
Elected mayor
Theodore Lyman II
Democratic

The 1834 Boston mayoral election saw the election of incumbent Theodore Lyman II. It was held on December 8, 1834.

Incumbent mayor Lyman was a Democrat. Both the Democrats and the Whigs nominated Lyman, leaving him formally unopposed. He was also supported by other tickets such as the "Grocer's Ticket". The decision for the Whigs not to put forth their own candidate came despite their dominance in the city's other municipal races in coinciding election.

== Results ==
1834 Boston mayoral election
Party	Candidate	Votes	%
Democratic	Theodore Lyman II (incumbent)	4,261	96.75
	Scattering	143	3.25
Total votes		4,404	100

== See also ==
- List of mayors of Boston, Massachusetts
