= 1830 Boston mayoral election =

Election in Massachusetts, United States

- December 13, 1830
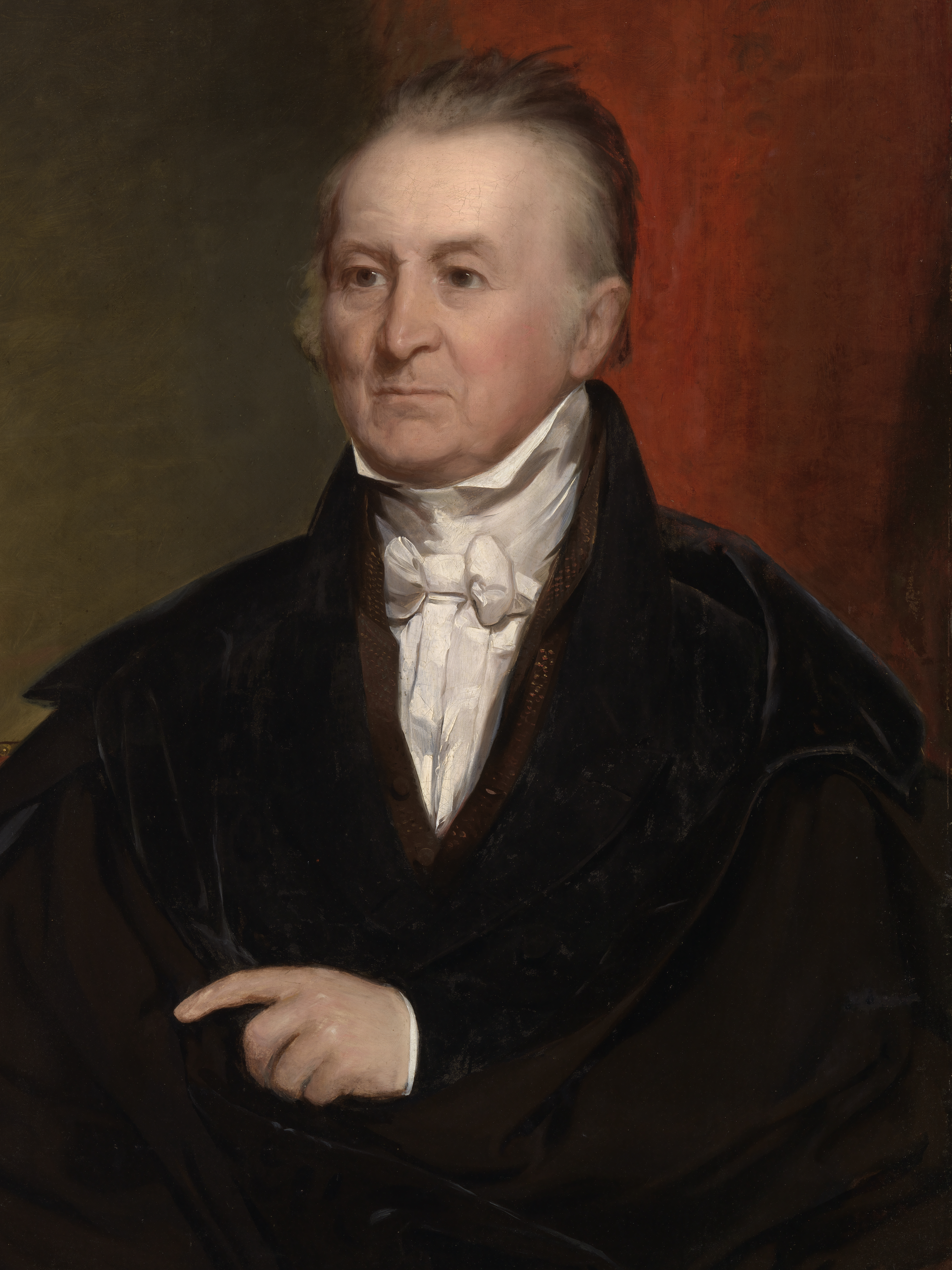

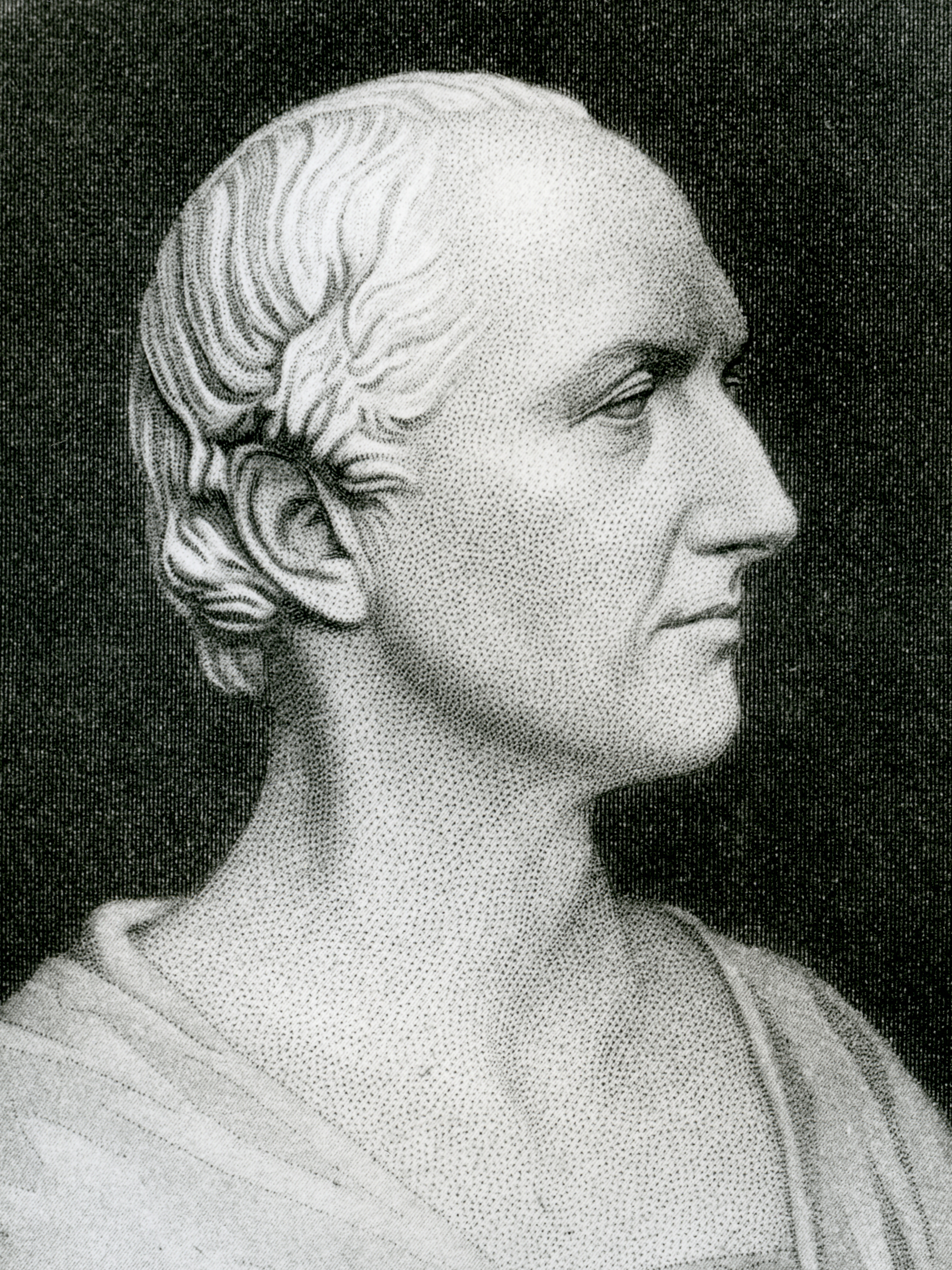
Candidate	Harrison Gray Otis	Theodore Lyman II
Party	Federalist	Working Men's Party
Popular vote	2,389	672
Percentage	66.42%	18.68%
Mayor before election
Harrison Gray Otis
Federalist
Elected mayor
Harrison Gray Otis
Federalist

The 1830 Boston mayoral election saw the reelection of incumbent Harrison Gray Otis to a third consecutive term. It was held on December 13, 1830.

Otis' opponent Theodore Lyman II was nominated by the Working Men's Party.

This election is notable for being the last in the United States to include a member of the Federalist Party.

== Results ==
1830 Boston mayoral election
Party	Candidate	Votes	%
Federalist	Harrison Gray Otis (incumbent)	2,389	66.42
Working Men's	Theodore Lyman II	672	18.68
Scattering	Other	97	2.70
Total votes		3,597	100

== See also ==
- List of mayors of Boston, Massachusetts
