= Federalist Party =

American political party (1789–c.1828)

- Black cockades were worn by Federalist supporters during the 1790s as a sign of opposition to the French Republic.
- Founder: Alexander Hamilton
- Founded: 1789; 237 years ago
- Dissolved: 1825; 201 years ago (National Party); 1829; 197 years ago (Last State Party); 1831; 195 years ago (Last Local Party)
- Succeeded by: National Republican Party; Whig Party
- Headquarters: Washington, D.C.
- Newspaper: Gazette of the United States
- Ideology: Federalism; American School; Conservative liberalism; Traditionalist conservatism; Classical liberalism; American nationalism
- Political position: Right-wing
- Colors: Black
- Senate (1799): 22 / 32 (peak)
- House (1799): 60 / 106 (peak)

The Federalist Party was a conservative and nationalist American political party and the first known political party in the United States. It dominated the national government from 1789 to 1801 with Alexander Hamilton serving as its leading ideological figure and chief architect of its economic policies. The party was defeated by the Democratic-Republican Party in 1800, and it became a minority party while keeping its stronghold in New England. It made a brief resurgence by opposing the War of 1812, then collapsed with its last presidential candidate in 1816, although it lasted for a few years afterwards.

The party appealed to businesses who favored banks, national over state government, and maintaining an army and navy. In world affairs, the party preferred Great Britain and strongly opposed involvement in the French Revolutionary and Napoleonic Wars. The party favored centralization, federalism, modernization, industrialization, and protectionism.

The Federalists called for a strong national government that promoted economic growth and fostered friendly relationships with Great Britain in opposition to Revolutionary France. The Federalist Party came into being between 1789 and 1790 as a national coalition of bankers and businessmen in support of Hamilton's fiscal policies. These supporters worked in every state to build an organized party committed to a fiscally sound and nationalistic government. The only Federalist president was John Adams. George Washington was broadly sympathetic to the Federalist program, but he remained officially non-partisan during his entire presidency. The Federalist Party controlled the national government until 1801, when it was overwhelmed by the Democratic-Republican opposition led by President Thomas Jefferson.

Federalist policies called for a national bank, tariffs, and good relations with Great Britain as expressed in the Jay Treaty negotiated in 1794. Hamilton developed the concept of implied powers and successfully argued the adoption of that interpretation of the Constitution. The Democratic-Republicans led by Jefferson denounced most of the Federalist policies, especially the bank and implied powers, and vehemently attacked the Jay Treaty as a sell-out of American interests to Britain. The Jay Treaty passed and the Federalists won most of the major legislative battles in the 1790s. They held a strong base in the nation's cities and in New England. They factionalized when President Adams secured peace with France, to the anger of Hamilton's larger faction. The Jeffersonians won the presidential election of 1800, and the Federalists never returned to power. They recovered some strength through their intense opposition to the War of 1812, but they practically vanished during the Era of Good Feelings that followed the end of the war in 1815.

The Federalists left a lasting legacy in the form of a strong federal government. After losing executive power, they decisively shaped Supreme Court policy for another three decades through Chief Justice John Marshall.

== Background ==
The term "Federalist" was previously used to refer to a somewhat different coalition of nationalists led by Washington, which advocated replacing the weaker national government under the Articles of Confederation with a new Constitution in 1789. This early coalition included Hamilton and James Madison.

The Federalists of this time were rivaled by the Anti-Federalists, who opposed the ratification of the Constitution and objected to creating a stronger central government. The critiques of the Constitution raised by the Anti-Federalists influenced the creation of the Bill of Rights. Federalists responded to these objections by promising to add a bill of rights as amendments to the Constitution to satisfy these concerns, which aided in securing acceptance and ratification of the Constitution by the states. The new United States Congress, initially with a Federalist majority, submitted to the states a series of amendments to guarantee specific freedoms and rights; once ratified, these would become the first ten amendments to the Constitution.

== History ==
=== Origins (1789–1792) ===
Political parties derivation. Dotted line means unofficially.

Upon taking office in 1789, President Washington nominated his wartime chief of staff Alexander Hamilton to the new office of Secretary of the Treasury. Hamilton wanted a strong national government with financial credibility, and he proposed the ambitious Hamiltonian economic program that involved the assumption of the state debts incurred during the American Revolution. This created a national debt and the means to pay it off, and it set up a national bank along with tariffs, with James Madison playing major roles in the program. Parties were considered to be divisive and harmful to republicanism, and no similar parties existed anywhere in the world.

By 1789, Hamilton started building a nationwide coalition (a "Pro-Administration" faction), realizing the need for vocal political support in the states. He formed connections with like-minded nationalists and used his network of treasury agents to link together friends of the government, especially merchants and bankers, in the new nation's dozen major cities. His attempts to manage politics in the national capital to get his plans through Congress brought strong responses across the country. In the process, what began as a capital faction soon assumed status as a national faction and then as the new Federalist Party. The Federalist Party supported Hamilton's vision of a strong centralized government and agreed with his proposals for a national bank and heavy government subsidies. In foreign affairs, they supported neutrality in the war between France and Great Britain.

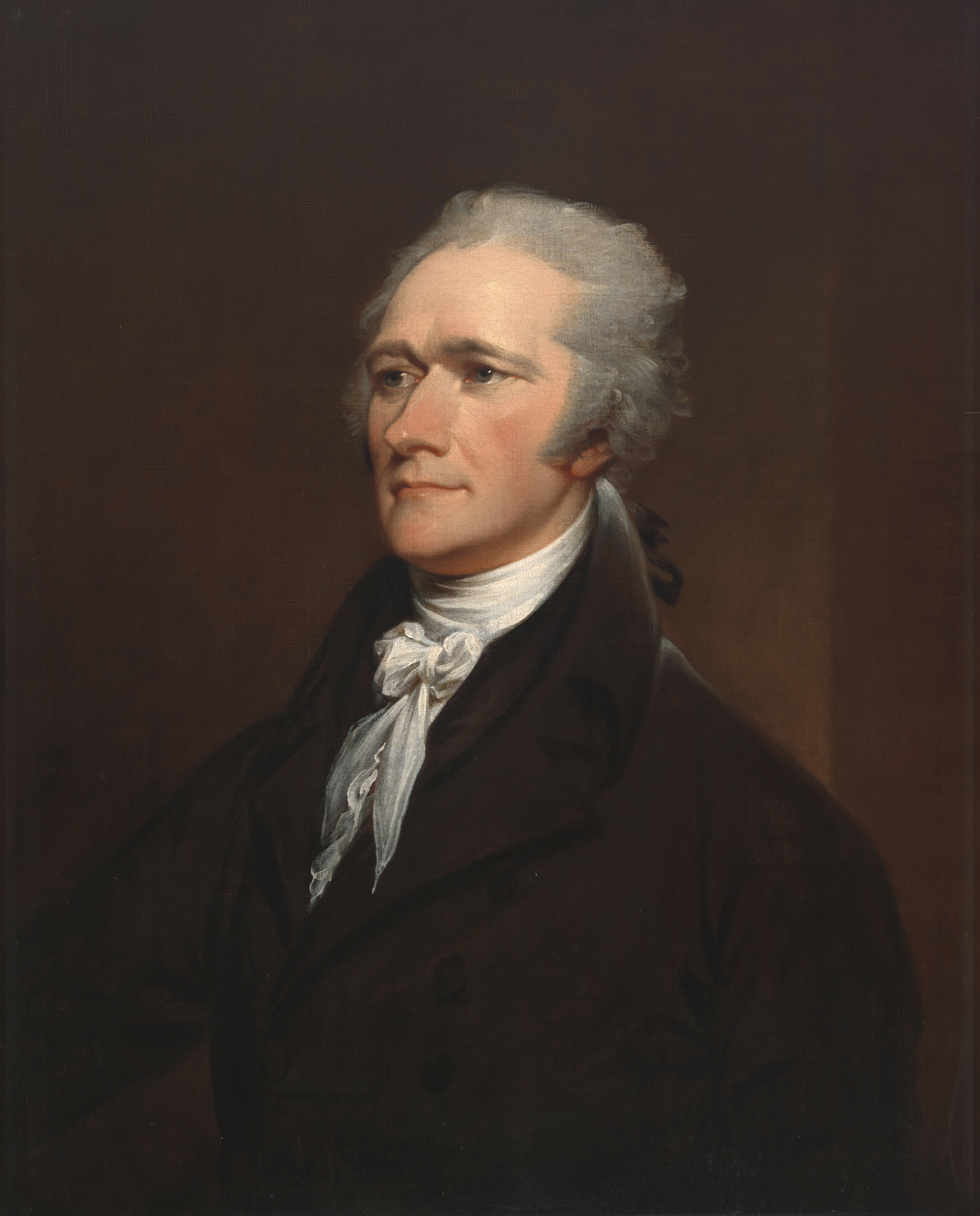
A portrait of Alexander Hamilton by John Trumbull, 1806

Hamilton proposed to fund the national and state debts, and Madison and John J. Beckley began organizing a party to oppose it. This "Anti-Administration" faction became what is now called the Democratic-Republican Party, led by Madison and Thomas Jefferson. This party attracted many Anti-Federalists who were wary of a centralized government.

=== Rise (1793–1796) ===
By the early 1790s, newspapers started calling Hamilton supporters "Federalists" and their opponents "Republicans", "Jeffersonians", or "Democratic-Republicans". Jefferson's supporters usually called themselves "Republicans" and their party the "Republican Party". The Federalist Party became popular with businessmen and New Englanders, and Republicans were mostly farmers who opposed a strong central government. Cities were usually Federalist strongholds, whereas frontier regions were heavily Republican. The Congregationalists of New England and the Episcopalians in the larger cities supported the Federalists, while other minority denominations tended toward the Republican camp. Urban Catholics were generally Federalists.

The state networks of both parties began to operate in 1794 or 1795, and patronage became a factor. The winner-takes-all election system opened a wide gap between winners, who got all the patronage, and losers who got none. Hamilton had many lucrative Treasury jobs to dispense—there were 1,700 of them by 1801. Jefferson had one part-time job in the State Department, which he gave to journalist Philip Freneau to attack the Federalists. In New York, George Clinton won the election for governor and used the vast state patronage fund to help the Republican cause.

Washington tried and failed to moderate the feud between his two top cabinet members. He was re-elected without opposition in 1792. The Democratic-Republicans (as they were now known) nominated New York's Governor Clinton to replace Federalist John Adams as vice president, but Adams won. The balance of power in Congress was close, with some members still undecided between the parties. In early 1793, Jefferson secretly prepared resolutions introduced by Virginia Congressman William Branch Giles designed to repudiate Hamilton and weaken the Washington Administration. Hamilton defended his administration of the nation's complicated financial affairs, which none of his critics could decipher until the arrival in Congress of Republican Albert Gallatin in 1793.

Federalists counterattacked by claiming that the Hamiltonian program had restored national prosperity, as shown in one 1792 anonymous newspaper essay:

To what physical, moral, or political energy shall this flourishing state of things be ascribed? There is but one answer to these inquiries: Public credit is restored and established. The general government, by uniting and calling into action the pecuniary resources of the states, has created a new capital stock of several millions of dollars, which, with that before existing, is directed into every branch of business, giving life and vigor to industry in its infinitely diversified operation. The enemies of the general government, the funding act and the National Bank may bellow tyranny, aristocracy, and speculators through the Union and repeat the clamorous din as long as they please; but the actual state of agriculture and commerce, the peace, the contentment and satisfaction of the great mass of people, give the lie to their assertions.

Jefferson wrote on 12 February 1798:

Two political Sects have arisen within the U. S. the one believing that the executive is the branch of our government which the most needs support; the other that like the analogous branch in the English Government, it is already too strong for the republican parts of the Constitution; and therefore in equivocal cases they incline to the legislative powers: the former of these are called federalists, sometimes aristocrats or monocrats, and sometimes tories, after the corresponding sect in the English Government of exactly the same definition: the latter are stiled republicans, whigs, jacobins, anarchists, disorganizers, etc. these terms are in familiar use with most persons.

==== French Revolution ====
The French Revolution and the subsequent war between royalist Britain and republican France decisively shaped American politics in 1793–1800 and threatened to entangle the country in wars that "mortally threatened its very existence". The French revolutionaries guillotined King Louis XVI in January 1793, and subsequently declared war on Britain. The French king had been decisive in helping the United States achieve independence, but now he was dead and many of the pro-American aristocrats in France were exiled or executed. Federalists warned that American republicans threatened to replicate the horrors of the French Revolution and successfully mobilized most conservatives and many clergymen. The Republicans, some of whom had been strong Francophiles, responded with support even through the Reign of Terror, when thousands were guillotined, though it was at this point that many began backing away from their pro-France leanings. Many of those executed had been friends of the United States, such as the Comte D'Estaing, whose fleet had fought alongside the Americans in the Revolution (Lafayette had already fled into exile, and Thomas Paine went to prison in France). The Republicans denounced Hamilton, Adams and even Washington as friends of Britain, as secret monarchists, aristocrats and as enemies of the republican values. The level of rhetoric reached a fever pitch.

In 1793, Paris sent a new minister, Edmond-Charles Genêt (known as Citizen Genêt), who systematically mobilized pro-French sentiment and encouraged Americans to support France's war against Britain and Spain. Genêt funded local Democratic-Republican Societies that attacked Federalists. He hoped for a favorable new treaty and for repayment of the debts owed to France. Acting aggressively, Genêt outfitted privateers that sailed with American crews under a French flag and attacked British shipping. He tried to organize expeditions of Americans to invade Spanish Louisiana and Spanish Florida. When Secretary of State Jefferson told Genêt he was pushing American friendship past the limit, Genêt threatened to go over the government's head and rouse public opinion on behalf of France. Even Jefferson agreed this was blatant foreign interference in domestic politics. Genêt's extremism seriously embarrassed the Jeffersonians and cooled popular support for promoting the French Revolution and getting involved in its wars. Recalled to Paris for execution, Genêt kept his head and instead went to New York, where he became a citizen and married the daughter of Governor Clinton. Jefferson left office, ending the coalition cabinet and allowing the Federalists to dominate.

The Jay Treaty battle in 1794–1795 was the effort by Washington, Hamilton and John Jay to resolve numerous difficulties with Britain. Some of these issues dated to the Revolution, such as boundaries, debts owed in each direction and the continued presence of British forts in the Northwest Territory. In addition, the United States hoped to open markets in the British Caribbean and end disputes stemming from the naval war between Britain and France. Most of all the goal was to avert a war with Britain—a war opposed by the Federalists, that some historians claim the Jeffersonians wanted.

As a neutral party, the United States argued it had the right to carry goods anywhere it wanted. The British nevertheless seized American ships carrying goods from the French West Indies. The Federalists favored Britain in the war and by far most of America's foreign trade was with Britain; hence a new treaty was called for. The British agreed to evacuate the western forts, open their West Indies ports to American ships, allow small vessels to trade with the French West Indies and set up a commission that would adjudicate American claims against Britain for seized ships and British claims against Americans for debts incurred before 1775. One possible alternative was war with Britain, a war that the United States was ill-prepared to fight.

The Republicans wanted to pressure Britain to the brink of war (and assumed that the United States could defeat a weak Britain). Therefore, they denounced the Jay Treaty as an insult to American prestige, a repudiation of the American-French alliance of 1777 and a severe shock to Southern planters who owed those old debts and who would now be never compensated for their escaped slaves who fled to British lines for their freedom. Republicans protested against the treaty and organized their supporters. The Federalists realized they had to mobilize their popular vote, so they mobilized their newspapers, held rallies, counted votes and especially relied on the prestige of President Washington. The contest over the Jay Treaty marked the first flowering of grassroots political activism in the United States, directed and coordinated by two national parties. Politics was no longer the domain of politicians as every voter was called on to participate. The new strategy of appealing directly to the public worked for the Federalists as public opinion shifted to support the Jay Treaty. The Federalists controlled the Senate and they ratified it by exactly the necessary two-thirds vote vote (20–10) in 1795. However, the Republicans did not give up and public opinion swung toward the Republicans after the Treaty fight and in the South the Federalists lost most of the support they had among planters.

==== Whiskey Rebellion ====
The excise tax of 1791 caused grumbling from the frontier including threats of tax resistance. Corn, the chief crop on the frontier, was too bulky to ship over the mountains to market unless it was first distilled into whiskey. This was profitable as the United States population consumed per capita relatively large quantities of liquor. After the excise tax, the backwoodsmen complained the tax fell on them rather than on the consumers. Cash poor, they were outraged that they had been singled out to pay off the "financiers and speculators" back in the East and to pay the salaries of the federal revenue officers who began to swarm the hills looking for illegal stills.

Insurgents in western Pennsylvania shut the courts and hounded federal officials, but Jeffersonian leader Albert Gallatin mobilized the western moderates and thus forestalled a serious outbreak. Washington, seeing the need to assert federal supremacy, called out 13,000 state militia and marched toward Washington, Pennsylvania to suppress this Whiskey Rebellion. The rebellion evaporated in late 1794 as Washington approached, personally leading the army (only two sitting Presidents have directly led American military forces, the other being Madison in an attempt to save the White House during the War of 1812). The rebels dispersed and there was no fighting. Federalists were relieved that the new government proved capable of overcoming rebellion while Republicans, with Gallatin as their new hero, argued there never was a real rebellion and the whole episode was manipulated in order to accustom Americans to a standing army.

Angry petitions flowed in from three dozen Democratic-Republican Societies created by Citizen Genêt. Washington attacked the societies as illegitimate, and many disbanded. Federalists now ridiculed Republicans as "democrats" (meaning in favor of mob rule) or "Jacobins" (a reference to the Reign of Terror in France).

Washington refused to run for a third term, establishing a two-term precedent that was to stand until 1940 and eventually to be enshrined in the Constitution as the 22nd Amendment. He warned in his Farewell Address against involvement in European wars and lamented the rising north–south sectionalism and party spirit in politics that threatened national unity:

The party spirits serves always to distract the Public Councils, and enfeeble the Public Administration. It agitates the Community with ill-founded jealousies and false alarms; kindles the animosity of one part against another, foments occasionally riot and insurrection. It opens the door to foreign influence and corruption, which find a facilitated access to the government itself through the channels of party passions. Thus the policy and the will of one country are subjected to the policy and will of another.

Washington never considered himself a member of any party, but broadly supported most Federalist policies.

=== Adams's administration (1797–1800) ===
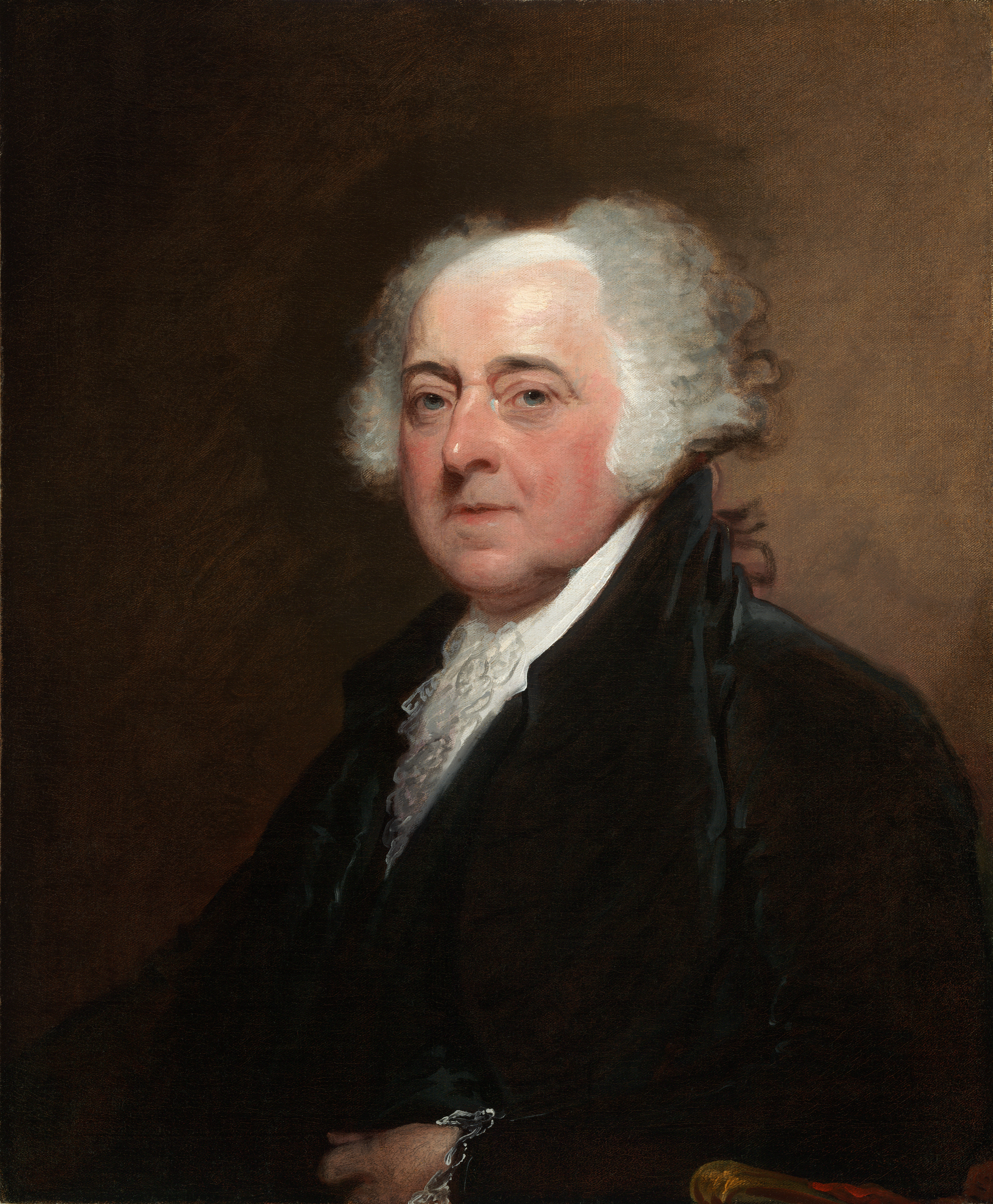
Gilbert Stuart, John Adams, c. 1800–1815

Hamilton distrusted Vice President Adams—who felt the same way about Hamilton—but was unable to block his claims to the succession. The election of 1796 was the first partisan affair in the nation's history and one of the more scurrilous in terms of newspaper attacks. Adams swept New England and Jefferson the South, with the middle states leaning to Adams. Adams was the winner by a margin of three electoral votes and Jefferson, as the runner-up, became vice president under the system set out in the Constitution prior to the ratification of the 12th Amendment.

Adams became president in 1797, when the Federalists controlled both houses of Congress, the presidency, eight state legislatures and ten governorships.

Foreign affairs continued to be the central concern of American politics, for the war raging in Europe threatened to drag in the United States. Historian Sarah Kreps in 2018 argues the Federalist faction led by President Adams during the 1798 Quasi-War could correspond to "today's right-of-center party".

The new president was a loner, who made decisions without consulting Hamilton or other "High Federalists". Benjamin Franklin once quipped that Adams was a man who was always honest, often brilliant and sometimes mad. Adams was popular among the Federalist rank and file, but had neglected to build state or local political bases of his own and neglected to take control of his own cabinet. As a result, his cabinet answered more to Hamilton than to himself. Hamilton was especially popular because he rebuilt the Army—and had commissions to give out.

==== Alien and Sedition Acts ====
After an American delegation was insulted in Paris in the XYZ affair of 1797, public opinion ran strongly against the French. An undeclared "Quasi-War" with France from 1798 to 1800 saw each side attacking and capturing the other's shipping. It was called "quasi" because there was no declaration of war, but escalation was a serious threat. At the peak of their popularity, the Federalists took advantage by preparing for an invasion by the French Army. To silence Administration critics, the Federalists passed the Alien and Sedition Acts in 1798. The Alien Act empowered the President to deport such aliens as he declared to be dangerous. The Sedition Act made it a crime to print false, scandalous and malicious criticisms of the federal government, but it conspicuously failed to criminalize criticism of Vice President Thomas Jefferson.

Several Republican newspaper editors were convicted under the Act and fined or jailed and three Democratic-Republican newspapers were shut down. In response, Jefferson and Madison secretly wrote the Kentucky and Virginia Resolutions passed by the two states' legislatures that declared the Alien and Sedition Acts unconstitutional and insisted the states had the power to nullify federal laws.

Undaunted, the Federalists created a navy, with new frigates; and a large new army, with Washington in nominal command and Hamilton in actual command. To pay for it all, they raised taxes on land, houses and slaves, leading to serious unrest. In one part of Pennsylvania, the John Fries's Rebellion broke out, with people refusing to pay the new taxes. John Fries was sentenced to death for treason, but received a pardon from Adams. In the elections of 1798, the Federalists did very well, but this issue started hurting the Federalists in 1799. Early in 1799, Adams decided to free himself from Hamilton's overbearing influence, stunning the country and throwing his party into disarray by announcing a new peace mission to France. The mission eventually succeeded, the "Quasi-War" ended and the new army was largely disbanded. Hamiltonians called Adams a failure while Adams fired Hamilton's supporters still in the cabinet.

Hamilton and Adams intensely disliked one another, and the Federalists split between supporters of Hamilton ("High Federalists") and supporters of Adams. Hamilton became embittered over his loss of political influence and wrote a scathing criticism of Adams' performance as president in an effort to throw Federalist support to Charles Cotesworth Pinckney. Inadvertently, this split the Federalists and helped give the victory to Jefferson.

==== Election of 1800 ====
Adams's peace moves proved popular with the Federalist rank and file and he seemed to stand a good chance of re-election in 1800. If the Three-Fifths Compromise had not been enacted, he most likely would have won reelection since many Federalist legislatures removed the right to select electors from their constituents in fear of a Democratic victory. Jefferson was again the opponent and Federalists pulled out all stops in warning that he was a dangerous revolutionary, hostile to religion, who would weaken the government, damage the economy and get into war with Britain. Many believed that if Jefferson won the election, it would be the end of the newly formed United States. The Republicans crusaded against the Alien and Sedition laws as well as the new taxes and proved highly effective in mobilizing popular discontent.

The election hinged on New York as its electors were selected by the legislature and given the balance of North and South, they would decide the presidential election. Aaron Burr brilliantly organized his forces in New York City in the spring elections for the state legislature. By a few hundred votes, he carried the city—and thus the state legislature—and guaranteed the election of a Republican president. As a reward, he was selected by the Republican caucus in Congress as their vice-presidential candidate. Alexander Hamilton, knowing the election was lost anyway, went public with a sharp attack on Adams that further divided and weakened the Federalists.

Members of the Republican Party planned to vote evenly for Jefferson and Burr because they did not want for it to seem as if their party was divided. The party took the meaning literally and Jefferson and Burr tied in the election with 73 electoral votes. This sent the election to the House of Representatives to break the tie. The Federalists had enough weight in the House to swing the election in either direction. Many would rather have seen Burr in the office over Jefferson, but Hamilton, who had a strong dislike of Burr, threw his political weight behind Jefferson. During the election, neither Jefferson nor Burr attempted to swing the election in the House of Representatives. Jefferson remained at Monticello to oversee the laying of bricks to a section of his home. Jefferson allowed for his political beliefs and other ideologies to filter out through letters to his contacts. Thanks to Hamilton's support, Jefferson would win the election and Burr would become his vice president.

The 1800 election marked the first time power had been transferred between opposing political parties, an act that occurred remarkably without bloodshed. Though there had been strong words and disagreements, contrary to the Federalists fears, there was no war and no ending of one-government system to let in a new one. His patronage policy was to let the Federalists disappear through attrition. Those Federalists such as John Quincy Adams (John Adams' own son) and Rufus King willing to work with him were rewarded with senior diplomatic posts, but there was no punishment of the opposition.

=== Collapse (1801–1806) ===
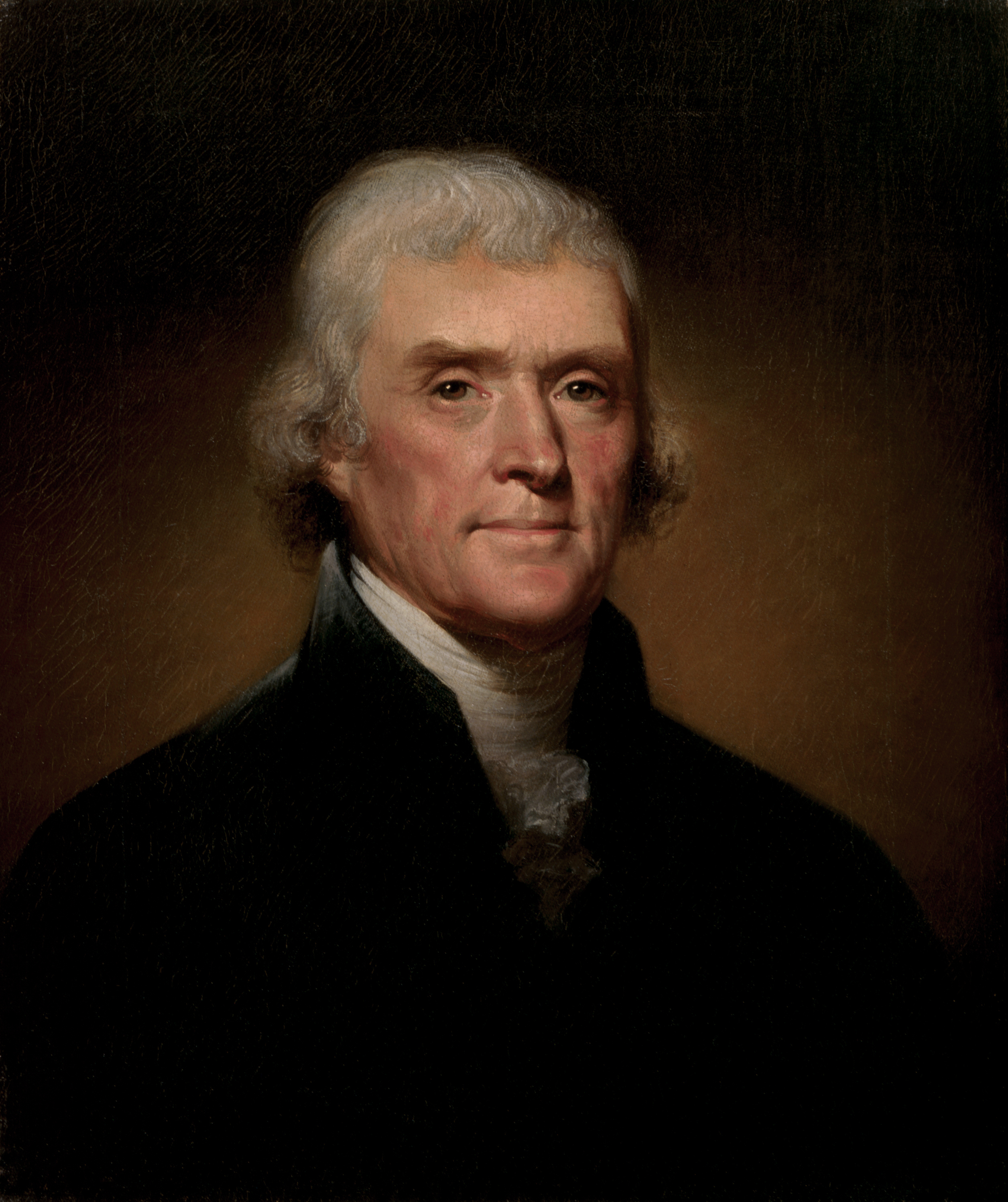
President Thomas Jefferson (1801–1809)

Jefferson had a very successful first term, typified by the Louisiana Purchase, which was supported by Hamilton, but opposed by most Federalists at the time as unconstitutional. Some Federalist leaders (such as Essex Junto) began courting Jefferson's vice president and Hamilton's nemesis Aaron Burr in an attempt to swing New York into an independent confederation with the New England states, which, along with New York, were supposed to secede from the United States after Burr's election to Governor. However, Hamilton's influence cost Burr the governorship of New York, a key in the Essex Junto's plan, just as Hamilton's influence had cost Burr the presidency nearly four years before. Hamilton's thwarting of Aaron Burr's ambitions for the second time was too much for Burr to bear. Hamilton had known of the Essex Junto (whom Hamilton now regarded as apostate Federalists) and Burr's plans and opposed them vehemently. This opposition by Hamilton would lead to his fatal duel with Burr in July 1804.

The thoroughly disorganized Federalists hardly offered any opposition to Jefferson's reelection in 1804 and Federalists seemed doomed. Jefferson had taken away most of their patronage, including federal judgeships. The party now controlled only five state legislatures and seven governorships. After again losing the presidency in 1804, the party was now down to three legislatures and five governorships (four in New England). Their majorities in Congress were long gone, dropping in the Senate from 23 in 1796, and 21 in 1800 to only six in 1804. In New England and in some districts in the middle states, the Federalists clung to power, but the tendency from 1800 to 1812 was steady slippage almost everywhere as the Republicans perfected their organization and the Federalists tried to play catch-up. Some younger leaders tried to emulate the Democratic-Republican tactics, but their overall disdain of democracy along with the upper class bias of the party leadership eroded public support. In the South, the Federalists steadily lost ground everywhere.

The Federalists continued for several years to be a major political party in New England and the Northeast, but never regained control of the presidency or the Congress. With the death of Washington and Hamilton and the retirement of Adams, the Federalists were left without a strong leader as Chief Justice John Marshall stayed out of politics. However, a few younger leaders did appear, notably Daniel Webster. Federalist policies favored factories, banking and trade over agriculture and therefore became unpopular in the growing Western states. They were increasingly seen as aristocratic and unsympathetic to democracy. In the South, the party had lingering support in Maryland, but elsewhere was crippled by 1800 and faded away by 1808.

Massachusetts and Connecticut remained the party strongholds. Historian Richard J. Purcell explains how well organized the party was in Connecticut:

It was only necessary to perfect the working methods of the organized body of office-holders who made up the nucleus of the party. There were the state officers, the assistants, and a large majority of the Assembly. In every county there was a sheriff with his deputies. All of the state, county, and town judges were potential and generally active workers. Every town had several justices of the peace, school directors and, in Federalist towns, all the town officers who were ready to carry on the party's work. Every parish had a "standing agent", whose anathemas were said to convince at least ten voting deacons. Militia officers, state's attorneys, lawyers, professors and schoolteachers were in the van of this "conscript army". In all, about a thousand or eleven hundred dependent officer-holders were described as the inner ring which could always be depended upon for their own and enough more votes within their control to decide an election. This was the Federalist machine.

After 1800, the Federalist's primary influence was concentrated in the judiciary. Although Jefferson succeeded in reappealing the Judiciary Act of 1801, which led to the removal of many lower-level Federalist federal judges, an effort to impeach Supreme Court Justice Samuel Chase in 1804 was unsuccessful. Under Chief Justice John Marshall, who served from 1801 to 1835, the Supreme Court developed a significant role in interpreting and protecting the Constitution and in shaping the development of American nationalism.

=== Revival (1807–1815) ===
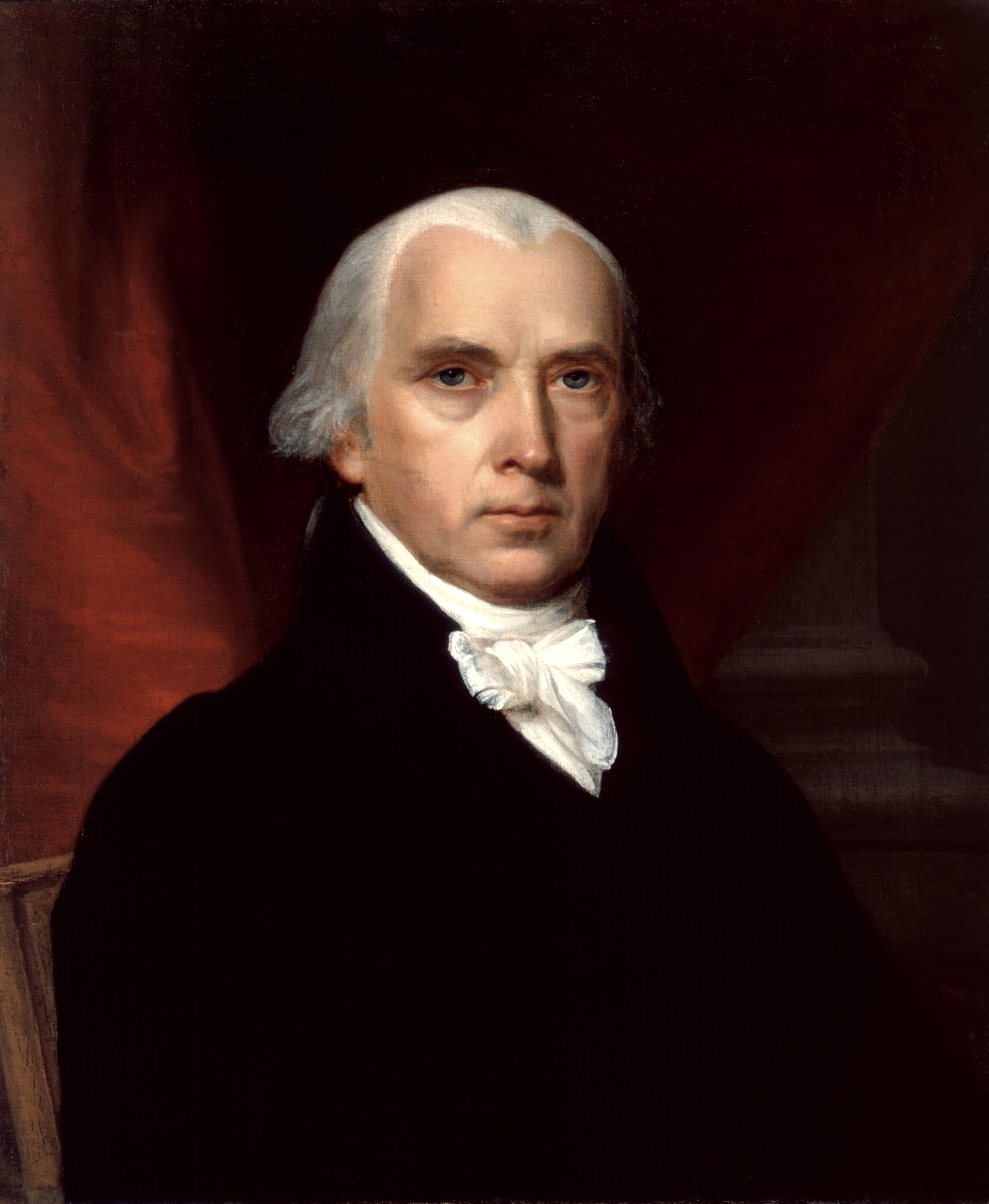
President James Madison (1809–1817)

==== Embargo Act ====
As the wars in Europe intensified, the United States became increasingly involved. The Federalists restored some of their strength by leading the anti-war opposition to Jefferson and Madison between 1807 and 1814. President Jefferson imposed an embargo on Britain in 1807 as the Embargo Act of 1807 prevented all American ships from sailing to a foreign port. The idea was that the British were so dependent on American supplies that they would come to terms. For 15 months, the Embargo wrecked American export businesses, largely based in the Boston-New York region, causing a sharp depression in the Northeast. Evasion was common and Jefferson and Treasury Secretary Gallatin responded with tightened police controls more severe than anything the Federalists had ever proposed. Public opinion was highly negative and a surge of support breathed fresh life into the Federalist Party.

As Jefferson refrained from seeking a third term, the Republicans nominated Madison for the presidency in 1808. Meeting in the first-ever national convention, Federalists considered the option of nominating Jefferson's Vice President George Clinton (who represented a different Clintonian party faction from New York, had run for the Republican candidacy in 1804 and had not wanted to become vice president) as their own candidate, but balked at working with him and again chose Charles Cotesworth Pinckney, their 1804 candidate. Madison lost New England excluding Vermont, but swept the rest of the country and carried a Republican Congress. Madison dropped the Embargo, opened up trade again and offered a carrot and stick approach. If either France or Britain agreed to stop their violations of American neutrality, the United States would cut off trade with the other country. Tricked by French Emperor Napoleon into believing France had acceded to his demands, Madison turned his wrath on Britain and the War of 1812 began. Young Daniel Webster, running for Congress from New Hampshire in 1812, first gained overnight fame with his anti-war speeches.

==== War of 1812 ====
The nation was at war during the 1812 presidential election and war was the burning issue. Opposition to the war was strong in traditional Federalist strongholds in New England and New York, where the party made a comeback in the elections of 1812 and 1814. In their second national convention in 1812, the Federalists, now the peace party, nominated DeWitt Clinton, the dissident Republican Mayor of New York City and an articulate opponent of the war, who had followed his uncle George Clinton as the leader of the Clintonian faction after his death. Madison ran for reelection promising a relentless war against Britain and an honorable peace. Clinton, denouncing Madison's weak leadership and incompetent preparations for war, could count on New England and New York. To win, he needed the middle states and there the campaign was fought out. Those states were competitive and had the best-developed local parties and most elaborate campaign techniques, including nominating conventions and formal party platforms. The Tammany Society in New York City highly favored Madison and the Federalists finally adopted the club idea in 1808. Their Washington Benevolent Societies were semi-secret membership organizations which played a critical role in every northern state as they held meetings and rallies and mobilized Federalist votes. New Jersey went for Clinton, but Madison carried Pennsylvania and thus was reelected with 59% of the electoral votes. However, the Federalists gained 14 seats in Congress.

The War of 1812 went poorly for the Americans for two years. Even though Britain was concentrating its military efforts on its war with Napoleon, the United States still failed to make any headway on land and was effectively blockaded at sea by the Royal Navy. The British raided and burned Washington, D.C. in 1814 and sent a force to capture New Orleans.

The war was especially unpopular in New England. The New England economy was highly dependent on trade and the British blockade threatened to destroy it entirely. In 1814, the British Navy finally managed to enforce their blockade on the New England coast, so the Federalists of New England sent delegates to the Hartford Convention in December 1814.

During the proceedings of the Hartford Convention, secession from the Union was discussed, though the resulting report listed a set of grievances against the Democratic-Republican federal government and proposed a set of Constitutional amendments to address these grievances. They demanded financial assistance from Washington to compensate for lost trade and proposed constitutional amendments requiring a two-thirds vote in Congress before an embargo could be imposed, new states admitted, or war declared. It also indicated that if these proposals were ignored, then another convention should be called and given "such powers and instructions as the exigency of a crisis may require". The Federalist Massachusetts Governor had already secretly sent word to England to broker a separate peace accord. Three Massachusetts "ambassadors" were sent to Washington to negotiate on the basis of this report.

By the time the Federalist "ambassadors" got to Washington, the war was over and news of Andrew Jackson's stunning victory in the Battle of New Orleans had raised American morale immensely. The "ambassadors" hastened back to Massachusetts, but not before they had done fatal damage to the Federalist Party. The Federalists were thereafter associated with the disloyalty and parochialism of the Hartford Convention and destroyed as a political force. Across the nation, Republicans used the great victory at New Orleans to ridicule the Federalists as cowards, defeatists and secessionists. Pamphlets, songs, newspaper editorials, speeches and entire plays on the Battle of New Orleans drove home the point.

=== Decline (1816–1828) ===
The Federalists fielded their last presidential candidate, Rufus King in 1816. With the party's passing, partisan hatreds and newspaper feuds declined and the nation entered the "Era of Good Feelings". Federalism in states like Massachusetts gradually blended into the conservative wing of the Democratic-Republicans. In the 1824 presidential election, New Englanders from both parties supported Adams, a native of the region. However, a few old Federalist leaders, who never forgave Adams for abandoning them, formed a ticket of unpledged electors with radical Democratic-Republicans. This ticket was overwhelmingly defeated and likely would have voted for Crawford.

After 1816, the Federalists had no national power base apart from John Marshall's Supreme Court. They had some local support in New England, New York, eastern Pennsylvania, Maryland and Delaware. After the collapse of the Federalist Party in the course of the 1824 presidential election, most surviving Federalists (including Daniel Webster) joined former Democratic-Republicans like Henry Clay to form the National Republican Party, which was soon combined with other anti-Jackson groups to form the Whig Party in 1833. By then, nearly all remaining Federalists joined the Whigs. However, some former Federalists like James Buchanan, Louis McLane and Roger B. Taney became Jacksonian Democrats.

The "Old Republicans", led by John Randolph of Roanoke, refused to form a coalition with the Federalists and instead set up a separate opposition since Jefferson, Madison, Gallatin, Monroe, John C. Calhoun and Clay had in effect adopted Federalist principles of implied powers to purchase the Louisiana Territory and after the failures and lessons of the War of 1812 raised tariffs to protect factories, chartered the Second National Bank, promoted a strong army and navy and promoted internal improvements. All these measures were opposed to the strict construction of the Constitution, which was the formal basis of the Democratic-Republicans, but the drift of the party to support them could not be checked. It was aided by the Supreme Court, whose influence under John Marshall as a nationalizing factor now first became apparent. The whole change reconciled the Federalists to their absorption into the Democratic-Republican Party. Indeed, they claimed that the absorption was in the other direction: that the Democratic-Republicans had recanted and that the "Washington-Monroe policy", as they termed it after 1820, was all that Federalists had ever desired.

The name "Federalist" came increasingly to be used in political rhetoric as a term of abuse and was denied by the Whigs, who pointed out that their leader Henry Clay was the Democratic-Republican Party leader in Congress during the 1810s.

Following 1824, no Federalist ran for governor of any state and most left for the National Republicans. After the dissolution of the final Federalist congressional caucus in 1825, the last traces of Federalist activity came in Delaware and Massachusetts local politics in the late 1820s. In other states there still technically existed Federalists (for example James Buchanan) but they were engaged in patronage with either Jackson or Adams. In Massachusetts, the Federalist Party ceased to function as a state organization in 1825, surviving only as a local Boston group for the next three years. In Delaware, the Federalist Party lasted until 1826 and controlled the Delaware House of Representatives. When Daniel Webster, representative of Boston, resigned in 1827 to run for U.S. Senator, a caucus of Federalists met in Boston to nominate his replacement. A young William Lloyd Garrison persuaded the caucus to choose the Federalist Harrison Gray Otis, who ultimately declined. The caucus then nominated the Anti-Jacksonian Benjamin Gorham, their original choice.

In the 1828 presidential election, the Federalists were used as a scapegoat in Boston. The Democratic Boston Statesman accused Adams of being a secret Hartford Federalist attempting to revive the "reign of terror" under his father. Adams responded by accusing the old Hartford Federalists of treason and attempting to dissolve the union to form their own confederation. The Jackson Republican, an ally of the Statesman and founded by former Federalist Theodore Lyman II, implicated Webster among the old Federalists Adams intended to impugn, leading to a libel suit. As a protest against Adams, several "Federal young men" who had been supporting Adams nominated a Federalist ticket of presidential electors. This ticket, headed by Otis and William Prescott Jr. and including three other members of the Hartford Convention, garnered a pitiful 156 votes in Boston and none elsewhere in the state. As with the previous election, Adams swept the city and state.

That ticket, according to the best of knowledge of Samuel Eliot Morison, was "the last ticket ever voted for that bore the name of the once powerful party of Washington and Hamilton".

== Ideology and policies ==
Fisher Ames (1758–1808) of Massachusetts ranks as one of the more influential figures of his era. Ames led Federalist ranks in the House of Representatives. His acceptance of the Bill of Rights garnered support in Massachusetts for the new Constitution. His greatest fame came as an orator who defined the principles of the Federalist Party and the follies of the Republicans. Ames offered one of the first great speeches in American Congressional history when he spoke in favor of the Jay Treaty. Ames was part of Hamilton's faction and cautioned against the excesses of democracy unfettered by morals and reason: "Popular reason does not always know how to act right, nor does it always act right when it knows". He warned his countrymen of the dangers of flattering demagogues, who incite dis-union and lead their country into bondage: "Our country is too big for union, too sordid for patriotism, too democratic for liberty. What is to become of it, He who made it best knows. Its vice will govern it, by practising upon its folly. This is ordained for democracies".

Intellectually, Federalists were profoundly devoted to liberty. As Samuel Eliot Morison explained, they believed that liberty is inseparable from union, that men are essentially unequal, that vox populi ("voice of the people") is seldom if ever vox Dei ("the voice of God") and that sinister outside influences are busy undermining American integrity. British historian Patrick Allitt concludes that Federalists promoted many positions that would form the baseline for later American conservatism, including the rule of law under the Constitution, republican government, peaceful change through elections, stable national finances, credible and active diplomacy and protection of wealth.

In terms of "classical conservatism", the Federalists did not support European-style aristocracy, monarchy, or established religion. Historian John P. Diggins says: "Thanks to the framers, American conservatism began on a genuinely lofty plane. James Madison, Alexander Hamilton, John Marshall, John Jay, James Wilson, and, above all, John Adams aspired to create a republic in which the values so precious to conservatives might flourish: harmony, stability, virtue, reverence, veneration, loyalty, self-discipline, and moderation. This was classical conservatism in its most authentic expression".

Federalists led the successful battles to abolish the international slave trade in New York City and the battle to abolish slavery in the state of New York. The Federalists' approach to nationalism was coined "open" nationalism in that it creates space for minority groups to have a voice in government. Many Federalists also created space for women to have a significant political role, which was not evident on the Democratic-Republican side.

The Federalists were dominated by businessmen and merchants in the major cities who supported a strong national government. The party was closely linked to the modernizing, urbanizing, financial policies of Alexander Hamilton. These policies included the funding of the national debt and also assumption of state debts incurred during the Revolutionary War, the incorporation of a national Bank of the United States, the support of manufactures and industrial development, and the use of a tariff to fund the Treasury. While it has long been accepted that commercial groups are in support of the Federalists and agrarian groups are in support of the Democratic-Republicans, recent studies have shown that support for Federalists was also evident in agrarian groups. In foreign affairs, the Federalists opposed the French Revolution, engaged in the "Quasi War" (an undeclared naval war) with France in 1798–99, sought good relations with Britain and sought a strong army and navy. Ideologically, the controversy between Democratic-Republicans and Federalists stemmed from a difference of principle and style. In terms of style, the Federalists feared mob rule, thought an educated elite should represent the general populace in national governance and favored national power over state power. Democratic-Republicans distrusted Britain, bankers, merchants and did not want a powerful national government. The Federalists, notably Hamilton, were distrustful of "the people", the French and the Republicans. In the end, the nation synthesized the two positions, adopting representative democracy and a strong nation state. Just as importantly, American politics by the 1820s accepted the two-party system whereby rival parties stake their claims before the electorate and the winner takes control of majority in state legislatures and the Congress and gains governorships and the presidency.

For economic and philosophical reasons, the Federalists tended to be pro-British—the United States engaged in more trade with Great Britain than with any other country—and vociferously opposed Jefferson's Embargo Act of 1807 and the seemingly deliberate provocation of war with Britain by the Madison Administration. During "Mr. Madison's War", as they called it, the Federalists made a temporary comeback. However, they lost all their gains and more during the patriotic euphoria that followed the war. The membership was aging rapidly, but a few young men from New England did join the cause, most notably Daniel Webster.

=== Slavery ===
While some Federalists advocated strategic support for the Haitian Revolution, the Federalist press strongly condemned Gabriel's Rebellion during the acrimonious presidential campaign of 1800 and claimed that "Jefferson would liberate all Negroes if elected." Prominent southern Federalists, including John Marshall, Thomas Pinckney, Charles Cotesworth Pinckney, and Edward Rutledge, were slaveholders. Charles Cotesworth Pinckney successfully defended slavery at the Constitutional Convention and led the Federalist Party in the elections of 1804 and 1808. New York prior to 1799 and New Jersey prior to 1804 were slave states as well, and several leading northern Federalists from these states owned slaves, including John Jay and Philip Schuyler. Federalists supported the Fugitive Slave Act of 1793's nearly unanimous passage through Congress, and the Federalist-aligned administration of George Washington signed the bill into law.

After 1800, as their political base contracted to New England, Federalists were increasingly opposed to slavery, both on principle and because the Three-fifths Compromise gave a political advantage to their opponents, who gained increased representation because of the weight given to disenfranchised enslaved people. Rufus King was a prominent opponent of slavery and became the final Federalist presidential candidate in 1816.

Recent scholarship has laid increasing emphasis on later Federalist opposition to slavery Day states

The Federalist Party is currently undergoing a renaissance among historians of the early Republic. This development is based largely on their occasional criticism of slavery. As the Democratic Republicans' stock has fallen in response to rising concerns over their leader Thomas Jefferson's racial views and deep entanglement with slavery, the Federalists who denounced Jefferson, the Republicans, and democracy itself have begun to look much better in comparison. While it has long been known that certain Federalist leaders—notably Alexander Hamilton and John Jay—opposed slavery and that attacks on slaveholding Virginia nabobs were part of the Federalist rhetorical arsenal after 1800, recent historians have found new significance in these facts.

However, Day argues that concerns about the political weight of the slaveholding states were more significant than moral opposition to slavery.

== Bases of support ==
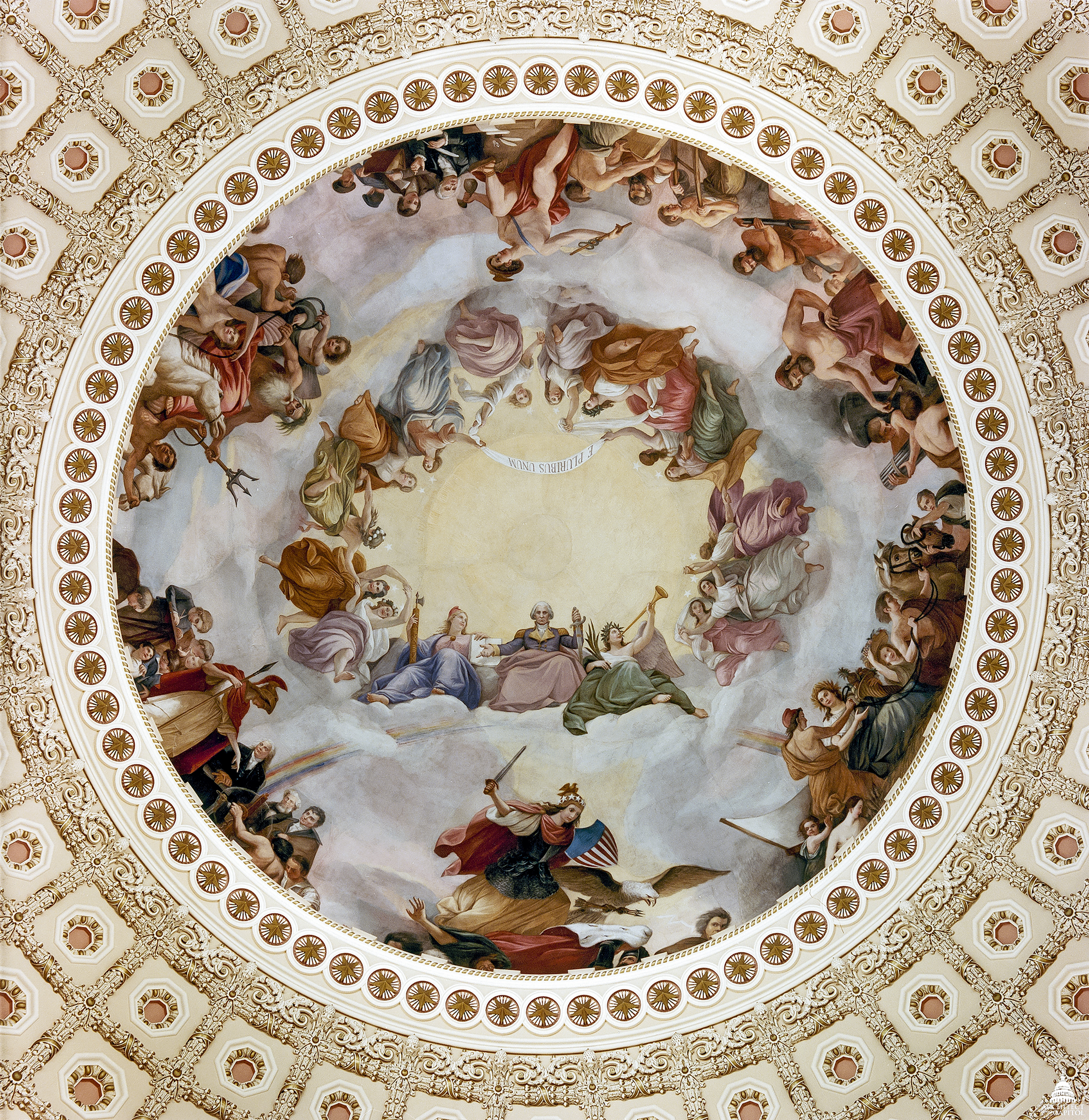
The Apotheosis of Washington as seen looking up from the Capitol rotunda in Washington, D.C.

After 1801, the Federalists had a weak base in the South, with their main base in the Northeast and especially New England, although there were some prominent southern Federalists like Charles Cotesworth Pinckney, who had been supported by Hamilton in the presidential election of 1800. As time went on, the Federalists lost appeal with the average voter and were generally not equal to the tasks of party organization; hence they grew steadily weaker as the political triumphs of the Democratic-Republican Party grew.

The Federalists were conscious of the need to boost voter identification with their party. Elections remained of central importance, but the rest of the political calendar was filled with celebrations, parades, festivals, and visual sensationalism. The Federalists employed multiple festivities, exciting parades, and even quasi-religious pilgrimages and "sacred" days that became incorporated into the American civil religion. George Washington was always their hero and after his death he became viewed as a sort of demigod looking down from heaven to bestow his blessings on the party. At first, the Federalists focused on commemorating the ratification of the Constitution and organized parades to demonstrate widespread popular support for the new Federalist Party. The parade organizers incorporated secular versions of traditional religious themes and rituals, thereby fostering a highly visible celebration of the nation's new civil religion.

The Fourth of July became a semi-sacred day—a status it has maintained for much of American history. Its celebration in Boston emphasized national over local patriotism and included orations, dinners, militia musters, parades, marching bands, floats and fireworks. By 1800, the Fourth of July was closely identified with the Federalist Party. Republicans were annoyed and staged their own celebrations on the same day—with rival parades sometimes clashing with each other, which generated even more excitement and larger crowds. After the collapse of the Federalists starting in 1815, the Fourth of July became a nonpartisan holiday.

=== Press ===
The spoils system helped finance Federalist printers until 1801 and Republican editors after that. Federalist Postmasters General, Timothy Pickering (1791–94) and Joseph Habersham (1795–1801) appointed and removed local postmasters to maximize party funding. Numerous printers were appointed as postmasters. They did not deliver the mail, but they did collect fees from mail users and obtained free delivery of their own newspapers and business mail.

To strengthen their coalitions and hammer away constantly at the opposition, both parties sponsored newspapers in the capital (Philadelphia) and other major cities. On the Republican side, Philip Freneau and Benjamin Franklin Bache blasted the administration with all the scurrility at their command. Bache in particular targeted Washington himself as the front man for monarchy who must be exposed. To Bache, Washington was a cowardly general and a money-hungry baron who saw the Revolution as a means to advance his fortune and fame; Adams was a failed diplomat who never forgave the French their love of Benjamin Franklin and who craved a crown for himself and his descendants; and Alexander Hamilton was the most inveterate monarchist of them all.

The Federalists, with twice as many newspapers at their command, slashed back with equal vituperation. John Fenno and "Peter Porcupine" (William Cobbett) were their nastiest penmen and Noah Webster their most learned. Hamilton subsidized the Federalist editors, wrote for their papers and in 1801 established his own paper, the New York Evening Post. Though his reputation waned considerably following his death, Joseph Dennie ran three of the most popular and influential newspapers of the period, The Farmer's Weekly Museum, the Gazette of the United States and The Port Folio.

=== Religious groups ===
In New England, the Federalist Party was closely linked to the Congregational church. When the party collapsed, the church was disestablished. In 1800 and other elections, the Federalists targeted infidelity in any form. They repeatedly charged that Republican candidates were atheistic or anti-religious, especially Jefferson, Paine, and Franklin. Conversely, the Baptists, Methodists, and other dissenters favored the Republican cause. Jefferson told the Baptists of Connecticut that there should be a "wall of separation" between church and state, alluding to the writings of Rhode Island's Roger Williams.

== Electoral history ==
=== Presidential tickets ===
Election	Ticket		Popular vote	Electoral vote	
Election	Presidential nominee	Running mate	Percentage	Electoral votes	Ranking
1796	John Adams	Thomas Pinckney	53.4%	71 / 138	1
1800	John Adams	Charles C. Pinckney	38.6%	65 / 138	2
1804	Charles C. Pinckney	Rufus King	27.2%	14 / 176	2
1808	Charles C. Pinckney	Rufus King	32.4%	47 / 176	2
1812	DeWitt Clinton (Note: While commonly labeled as the Federalist candidate, Clinton technically ran as a Democratic-Republican and was not nominated by the Federalist Party itself, the latter simply deciding not to field a candidate. This did not prevent endorsements from state Federalist parties (such as in Pennsylvania), but he received the endorsement from the New York state Democratic-Republicans as well. The Virginia state Federalist Party rejected the Clinton–Ingersoll ticket and instead nominated Rufus King for President and William Richardson Davie for Vice President—this ticket earned 27% of the state vote and 2% of the national vote.)	Jared Ingersoll	47.6%	89 / 217	2
1816	Rufus King (Note: The Federalists never held a caucus or made a formal nomination. King received 34 votes from Federalist unpledged electors.)	No candidate (Note: John Eager Howard received 22 electoral votes, James Ross received 5, John Marshall received 4, and Robert Goodloe Harper received 1.)	30.9%	34 / 217	2
1820	No candidate (Note: Though the Federalists did not put forward a ticket in the 1820 election, Federalist presidential electors received a portion of the popular vote. The successful Federalist electors voted for Democratic-Republican incumbent president James Monroe.)		16.2%	14 / 232	2

=== Congressional representation ===
The affiliation of many Congressmen in the earliest years is an assignment by later historians. The parties were slowly coalescing groups; at first there were many independents. Cunningham noted that only about a quarter of the House of Representatives up until 1794 voted with Madison as much as two-thirds of the time and another quarter against him two-thirds of the time, leaving almost half as fairly independent.

Congress	Years	Senate					House of Representatives					President
Congress	Years	Total	Anti- Admin	Pro- Admin	Others	Vacancies	Total	Anti- Admin	Pro- Admin	Others	Vacancies	President
1st	1789–1791	26	8	18	—	—	65	28	37	—	—	George Washington
2nd	1791–1793	30	13	16	—	1	69	30	39	—	—	George Washington
3rd	1793–1795	30	14	16	—	—	105	54	51	—	—	George Washington
Congress	Years	Total	Democratic- Republicans	Federalists	Others	Vacancies	Total	Democratic- Republicans	Federalists	Others	Vacancies	President
4th	1795–1797	32	11	21	—	—	106	59	47	—	—	George Washington
5th	1797–1799	32	10	22	—	—	106	49	57	—	—	John Adams
6th	1799–1801	32	10	22	—	—	106	46	60	—	—	John Adams
7th	1801–1803	34	17	15	—	2	107	68	38	—	1	Thomas Jefferson
8th	1803–1805	34	25	9	—	—	142	103	39	—	—	Thomas Jefferson
9th	1805–1807	34	27	7	—	—	142	114	28	—	—	Thomas Jefferson
10th	1807–1809	34	28	6	—	—	142	116	26	—	—	Thomas Jefferson
11th	1809–1811	34	27	7	—	—	142	92	50	—	—	James Madison
12th	1811–1813	36	30	6	—	—	143	107	36	—	—	James Madison
13th	1813–1815	36	28	8	—	—	182	114	68	—	—	James Madison
14th	1815–1817	38	26	12	—	—	183	119	64	—	—	James Madison
15th	1817–1819	42	30	12	—	—	185	146	39	—	—	James Monroe
16th	1819–1821	46	37	9	—	—	186	160	26	—	—	James Monroe
17th	1821–1823	48	44	4	—	—	187	155	32	—	—	James Monroe
18th	1823–1825	48	43	5	—	—	213	189	24	—	—	James Monroe

== See also ==
- Blue light federalists
- Democratic-Republican Party
- Essex Junto
- Federalist Era
- First Party System
- List of political parties in the United States

== Bibliography ==
- Ben-Atar, Doron S.; Liz B. MacMillan (eds.) (1999). Federalists Reconsidered.
- Buel, Richard Jr. (1972). Securing the Revolution: Ideology in American Politics, 1789–1815. Cornell University Press. ISBN 0-8014-0705-2.
- Chambers, William Nisbet (1963). Political Parties in a New Nation: The American Experience, 1776–1809.
- Chambers, William Nisbet, ed. (1972). The First Party System: Federalists and Republicans. Wiley. ISBN 0-471-14340-5.
- Chemerinsky, Erwin (2019). Constitutional Law: Principles and Policies (6th ed.). New York: Wolters Kluwer. ISBN 978-1-4548-9574-9.
- Chernow, Ron (2004). Alexander Hamilton. Penguin Books. ISBN 1-59420-009-2.
- Chernow, Ron (2010). Washington: A Life. online
- Cunningham, Noble E. Jr. (1965). The Making of the American Party System 1789 to 1809. Englewood Cliffs, N.J.: Prentice-Hall.
- Dauer, Manning J. The Adams Federalists (1953) online
- Dougherty, Keith L. (2020) "TRENDS: Creating Parties in Congress: The Emergence of a Social Network." Political Research Quarterly 73.4 (2020): 759–773. online Archived April 5, 2022, at the Wayback Machine
- Elkins, Stanley; McKitrick, Eric (1990). The Age of Federalism: The Early American Republic, 1788-1800. A major scholarly survey. Online free.
- Ferling, John. John Adams: A Life (1992).
- Fischer, David Hackett (1965). The Revolution of American Conservatism: The Federalist Party in the Era of Jeffersonian Democracy. New York: Harper & Row.
- Formisano, Ronald P. (2001). "State Development in the Early Republic" in Shafer, Boyd; Badger, Anthony (eds.). Contesting Democracy: Substance and Structure in American Political History, 1775–2000. pp. 7–35.
- Goodman, Paul, ed. The Federalists vs. the Jeffersonian Republicans (1977) online, short excerpts by leading historians
- Hartog, Jonathan J. Den (2015). Patriotism and Piety: Federalist Politics and Religious Struggle in the New American Nation. University of Virginia Press. 280 pp.
- Hickey, Donald R (1978). "Federalist Party Unity and the War of 1812". Journal of American Studies. 12#1 pp. 23–39.
- Jensen, Richard (2000). "Federalist Party" in Encyclopedia of Third Parties. M. E. Sharpe.
- Kerber, Linda K. Federalists in dissent; imagery and ideology in Jeffersonian America (1970) online
- Kohn, Richard H. Eagle and sword : the Federalists and the creation of the military establishment in America, 1783-1802 (1975) online
- Lampi, Philip J. (2013). "The Federalist Party Resurgence, 1808–1816: Evidence from the New Nation Votes Database". Journal of the Early Republic. 33#2. pp. 255–281. Summary online Archived December 24, 2016, at the Wayback Machine.
- McCullough, David (2002). John Adams. Simon and Schuster. ISBN 0-7432-2313-6.
- McDonald, Forrest (1974). The Presidency of George Washington. University Press of Kansas. ISBN 0-7006-0110-4.
- Mason, Matthew (March 2009). "Federalists, Abolitionists, and the Problem of Influence". American Nineteenth Century History. 10. pp. 1–27.
- Miller, John C. (1960). The Federalist Era: 1789–1801. Harper. ISBN 1-57766-031-5. Scholarly online free.
- Mitchell, Broadus (1962). Alexander Hamilton: The National Adventure, 1788–1804. Macmillan.
- Pasley, Jeffrey L.; et al., eds. (2004). Beyond the Founders: New Approaches to the Political History of the Early American Republic.
- Risjord, Norman, ed. (1969). The Early American Party System. Harper & Row.
- Sharp, James Rogers (1993). American Politics in the Early Republic: The New Nation in Crisis. Yale University Press. ISBN 9780300055306. Detailed political history of the 1790s.
- Smelser, Marshall (1968). The Democratic Republic 1801–1815. New York, Harper & Row. General survey.
- Stoltz III, Joseph F., “'It Taught Our Enemies a Lesson' The Battle of New Orleans and the Republican Destruction of the Federalist Party", Tennessee Historical Quarterly 71 (Summer 2012), 112–27. Heavily illustrated
- Theriault, Sean M. (2006). "Party Politics during the Louisiana Purchase". Social Science History. 30(2). pp. 293–324. doi:10.1215/01455532-30-2-293.
- Turner, Lynn W. (2002). "Elections of 1816 and 1820". In Schlesinger, Arthur M. Jr.; Israel, Fred L. (eds.). History of American Presidential Elections, 1789–2001. Vol. 1. Philadelphia: Chelsea House Publishers. pp. 298–345.
- Viereck, Peter (1956, 2006) Conservative Thinkers from John Adams to Winston Churchill. New Brunswick, NJ: Transaction Publishers.
- Waldstreicher, David. "The Nationalization and Racialization of American Politics: 1790–1840" in Shafer, Boyd; Badger, Anthony (eds.) (2001). Contesting Democracy: Substance and Structure in American Political History, 1775–2000. pp. 37–83.
- White, Leonard D. The Federalists: a study in administrative history (1948) online. the Federalists as government administrators and bureaucrats.
- Wood, Gordon S. (2009). Empire of Liberty: A History of the Early Republic, 1789–1815. excerpt Archived September 22, 2022, at the Wayback Machine.

=== Regional and state politics ===
- Banner, James M. (1970). To the Hartford Convention: The Federalists and the Origins of Party Politics in Massachusetts, 1789–1815. New York: Knopf.
- Beeman, Richard R. (1972). The Old Dominion and the New Nation, 1788–1801. [Lexington]: University Press of Kentucky. ISBN 9780813112695.
- Broussard, James H. (1978). The Southern Federalists: 1800–1816. Louisiana State University Press. ISBN 9780807102886.
- Formisano, Ronald (1983). The Transformation of Political Culture: Massachusetts Parties, 1790s–1840s. New York: Oxford University Press. ISBN 978-0-19-503124-9.
- Fox, Dixon Ryan (1919). The Decline of Aristocracy in the Politics of New York, 1801–1840. Longmans, Green & Co., agents. ASIN B000863CHY.
- Lafferty, Ben Paul. American Intelligence: Small-Town News and Political Culture in Federalist New Hampshire (U of Massachusetts Press, 2020) online Archived March 8, 2023, at the Wayback Machine
- Morison, Samuel Eliot. Harrison Gray Otis, 1765–1848: The Urbane Federalist (1969) on Massachusetts online
- Pasler, Rudolph J., and Margaret C. Pasler. The New Jersey Federalists (1975) online
- Phillips, Ulrich B. "The South Carolina Federalists, I" American Historical Review 14#3 (1909), pp. 529–43. online
  - "The South Carolina Federalists, II". American Historical Review 14#4 (1909), pp. 731–43. online
- Risjord, Norman K. (1967). "The Virginia Federalists". The Journal of Southern History. 33 (4): 486–517. doi:10.2307/2204473. JSTOR 2204473.
- Rose, Lisle A. Prologue to democracy: The Federalists in the South, 1789-1800 (1968) online
- Tinkcom, Harry Marlin. The Republicans and Federalists in Pennsylvania, 1790-1801: a study in national stimulus and local response (1950) online

=== Newspapers ===
- Humphrey, Carol Sue (1996). The Press of the Young Republic, 1783–1833.
- Knudson, Jerry W. (2006). Jefferson and the Press: Crucible of Liberty. How four Republican and four Federalist newspapers covered the election of 1800; Thomas Paine; Louisiana Purchase; Hamilton-Burr duel; impeachment of Chase; and the embargo.
- Miller, Neil Brody. " 'Proper subjects for public inquiry' the first Unitarian Controversy and the transformation of Federalist print culture." Early American Literature 43.1 (2008): 101-135. online Archived March 25, 2024, at the Wayback Machine
- Pasley, Jeffrey L. 'The Tyranny of Printers': Newspaper Politics in the Early American Republic (2003) online
- Rollins, Richard. The Long Journey of Noah Webster (1980); Webster was an important Federalist editor.
- Rudanko, Juhani. "'[T] his most unnecessary, unjust, and disgraceful war': Attacks on the Madison Administration in Federalist newspapers during the War of 1812." Journal of historical pragmatics 12.1-2 (2011): 82-103. online
- Smith, Steven Carl. "'A Rash, Thoughtless, and Imprudent Young Man': John Ward Fenno and the Federalist Literary Network." Literature in the Early American Republic 6 (2014): 1+ .
- Sheehan, Colleen A. (2004). "Madison v. Hamilton: The Battle over Republicanism and the Role of Public Opinion". The American Political Science Review. 98 (3): 405–424. doi:10.1017/S0003055404001248. JSTOR 4145337. S2CID 145693742.

=== Primary sources ===
- McColley, Robert, ed. Federalists, Republicans, and foreign entanglements, 1789-1815 (1969) online, primary sources on foreign policy
