= 1832 Boston mayoral election =

Election in Massachusetts, United States

- December 10, 1832
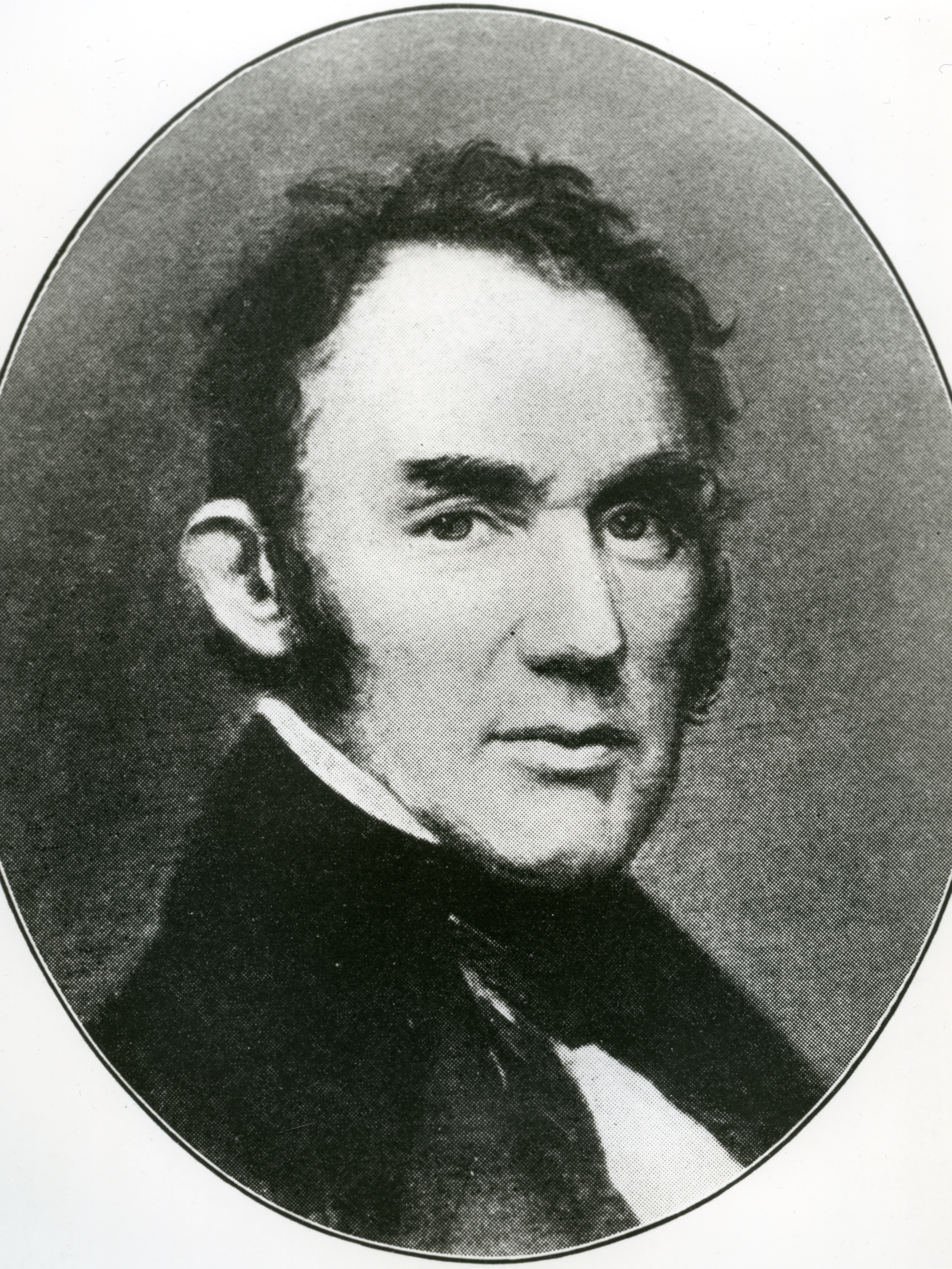

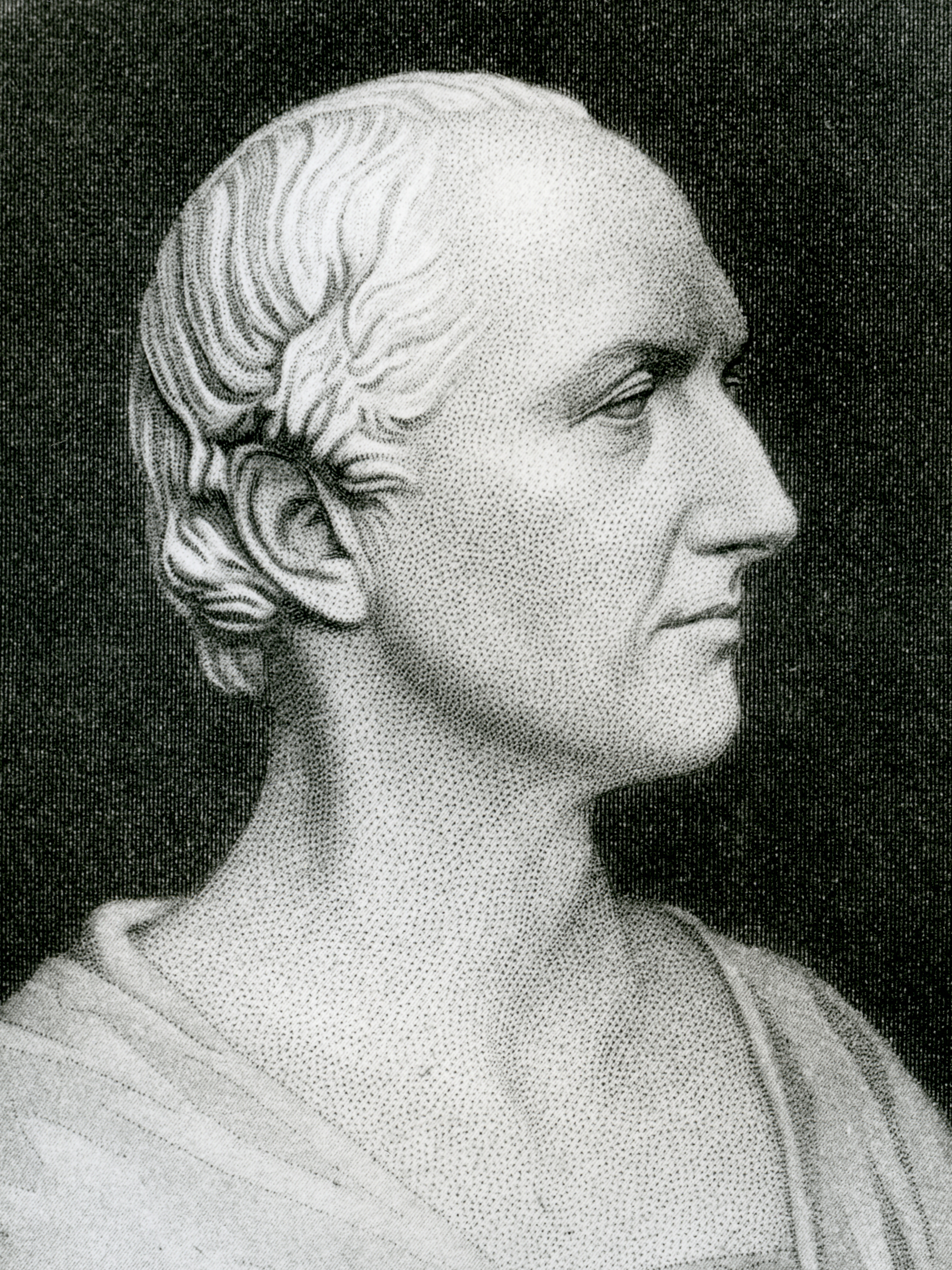
Candidate	Charles Wells	Samuel A. Wells	Theodore Lyman II
Party	National Republican	Anti-Masonic
Popular vote	2,918	469	~ 200
Percentage	78.86%	12.68%	~ 5.41%
Mayor before election
Charles Wells
National Republican
Elected mayor
Charles Wells
National Republican

The 1832 Boston mayoral election saw the reelection of incumbent Charles Wells. It was held on December 10, 1832.

Charles Wells ran as the National Republican Party nominee. His opponent, Samuel A. Wells was nominated by the Anti-Masonic Party. Theodore Lyman II also ran.

== Results ==
Lyman received approximately 200 votes, counted in the scattering.

1832 Boston mayoral election
Party	Candidate	Votes	%
National Republican	Charles Wells (incumbent)	2,918	78.86
Anti-Masonic	Samuel A. Wells	469	12.68
Scattering	Other (including Lyman)	313	8.46
Total votes		3,700	100

== See also ==
- List of mayors of Boston, Massachusetts
