= Essex Junto =

Influential group within the Federalist Party

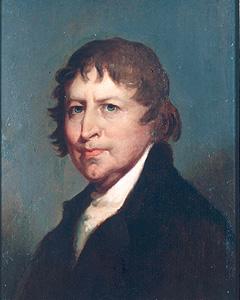
Theophilus Parsons, a moderate leader of the Junto

The Essex Junto was a powerful group and faction of the New England Federalist Party, constituting lawyers, merchants, and politicians, so called because many in the original group were from Essex County, Massachusetts. The party was the hard-right of the greater federalist party of the region, supporting a reactionary approach to proposed mass suffrage, democratic reform and a form of government patterned on the British constitutional model.

== Origins and definition ==
The term was coined as an invective by John Hancock in 1778 to describe the main opponents of a proposed constitution on Massachusetts. The proposed constitution was rejected by the people; the state adopted the Massachusetts Constitution in 1780. John Adams is also frequently credited with the use of the name.

Some politicians identified with the Essex Junto were Timothy Pickering, George Cabot, Fisher Ames, Francis Dana, Nathan Dane, Benjamin Goodhue, Stephen Higginson, Jonathan Jackson, John Lowell, Israel Thorndike, and Theophilus Parsons.

== Early political activity ==
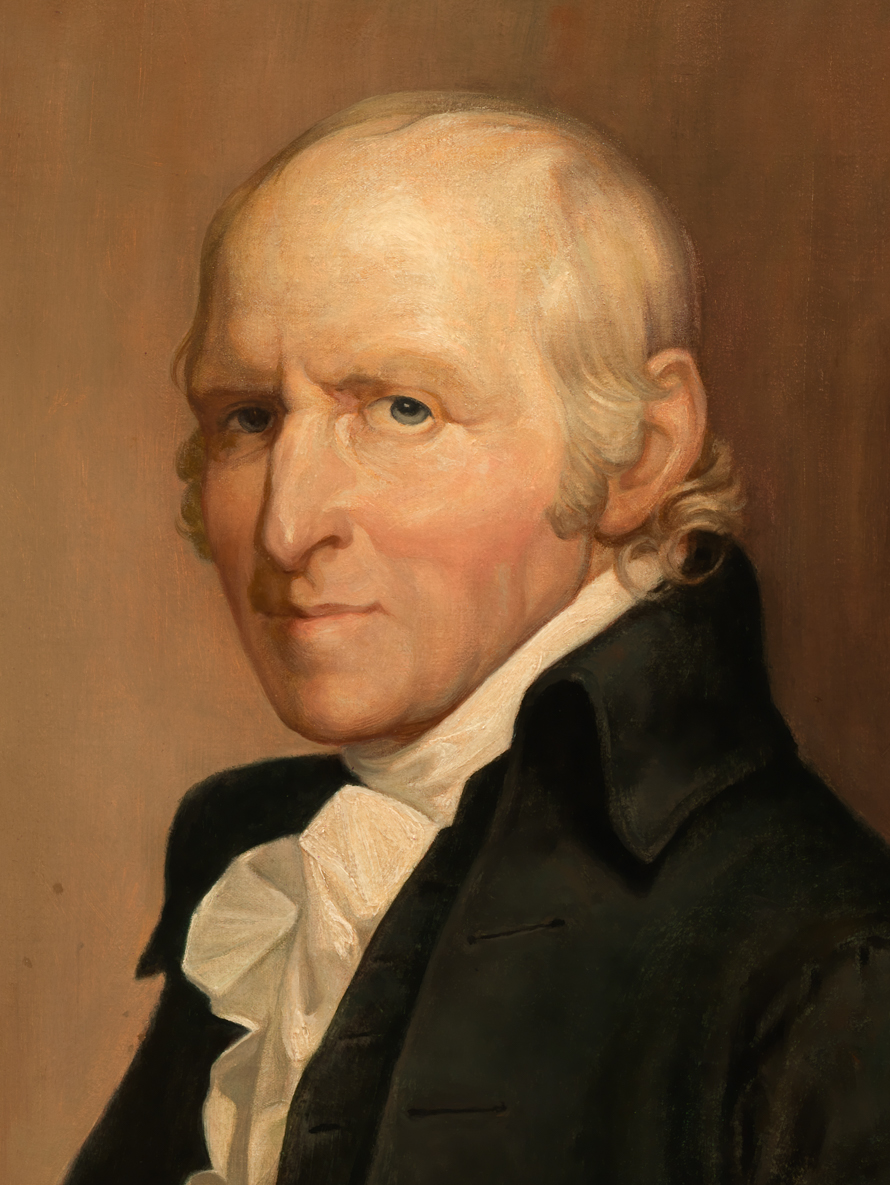
Timothy Pickering, a radical leader of the Junto and secessionist

The group supported Alexander Hamilton and a group of Massachusetts radicals led by Timothy Pickering that agitated for the dissolution of the Union or for New England's secession. When Hamilton was recruited to the plot to secede New England from the Union, he rejected the offer. Pickering represented the more radical faction of the group as opposed to Parsons moderation. Consequently, the Essex Junto tried to gain the support of Aaron Burr, who accepted the offer in hopes of regaining political power removed by his loss against Thomas Jefferson.

== War of 1812 ==
During the War of 1812, the Junto was called "Blue Lights" because of the common belief and reports from the US Navy that they would shine blue lights to alert the British blockading ships of escaping American ships or to alert British ships to come ashore and carry out illegal trade. It supported the Hartford Convention's disaffection with the War of 1812, but the claim that it seriously proposed secession of New England is not considered historically accurate.
