= 1831 Boston mayoral election =

Election in Massachusetts, United States

- December 12, 1831 (first vote); December 22, 1831 (second round)
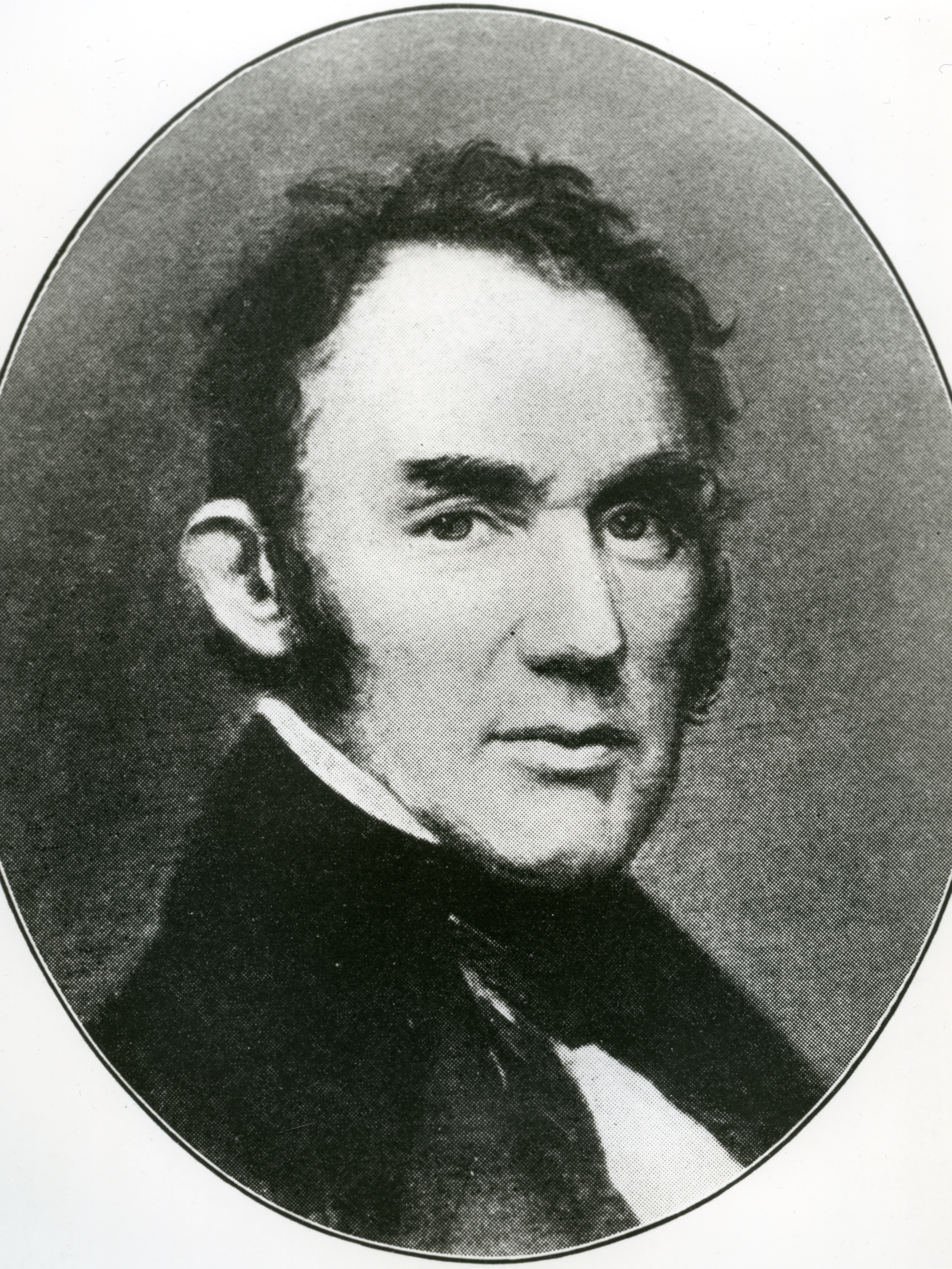

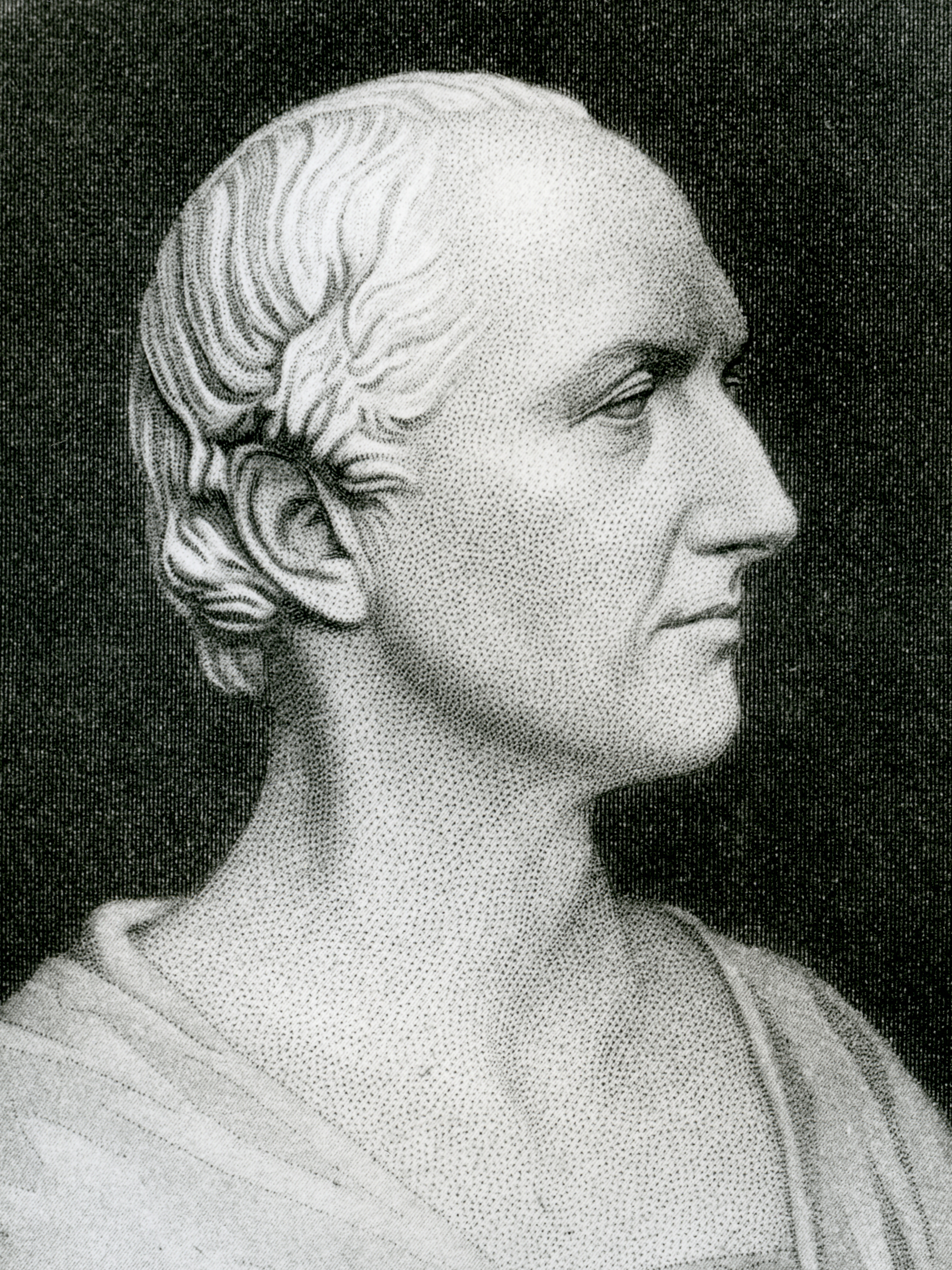

Candidate	Charles Wells	Theodore Lyman II	William Sullivan
Party	National Republican	Grocer's Party	National Republican
First vote	1,851 (41.23%)	1,838 (40.94%)	> 1,100 (> 24.50%)
Second vote	3,316 (55.94%)	2,389 (40.30%)	not a candidate in second vote
Mayor before election
Charles Wells
National Republican
Elected mayor
Charles Wells
National Republican

The 1831 Boston mayoral election saw the election of Charles Wells. The first vote, held on December 12, 1831, did not result in any candidate receiving the required majority of the vote, resulting in a second vote on December 22, 1831, which Wells won.

== First vote (December 12, 1831) ==
Charles Wells was the city's National Republican Party's nominee. William Sullivan was an independent National Republican candidate nominated by a faction of the city's National Republicans. Lyman was nominated by the Grocer's Party. Theodore Lyman II's opponents accused him of being a Jacksonian. Lyman was seen as receiving support from a number of small parties, as well as many National Republicans. Lyman also was supported by part of the Anti-Tariff Party.

Result
Sullivan received in excess of 1,100 votes, counted in the scattering

Boston mayoral election first vote (December 12, 1831)
Party	Candidate	Votes	%
National Republican	Charles Wells	1,851	41.23
Grocer's	Theodore Lyman II	1,838	40.94
Scattering	Other (including Sullivan)	1,160	25.84
Total votes		4,849	100

== Second vote (December 22, 1831) ==
Sullivan did not run in the second vote, making it a two-way race.

Boston mayoral election second vote (December 22, 1831)
Party	Candidate	Votes	%
National Republican	Charles Wells	3,316	55.94
Grocer's	Theodore Lyman II	2,389	40.30
Scattering	Other	223	3.76
Total votes		5,928	100

== See also ==
- List of mayors of Boston, Massachusetts
