= Democratic-Republican Societies =

Democratic-Republican Societies were local political organizations formed in the United States in 1793 and 1794 to promote republicanism and democracy and to fight aristocratic tendencies. They were independent of each other and had no coordinating body. Historians use the term "Democratic-Republican" to describe the societies, but that name was rarely used by the societies themselves. They usually called themselves "Democratic", "Republican", "True Republican", "Constitutional", "United Freeman", "Patriotic", "Political", "Franklin" or "Madisonian".

The Germans of Philadelphia began the first society in April 1793 and were inspired by Peter Muhlenberg. Philadelphia was then the national capital, and soon, an English-speaking society was formed in the city by David Rittenhouse, Charles Biddle (a prominent Quaker merchant), Dr. George Logan, and Alexander J. Dallas. Its charter was widely copied. At least 35 societies had sprung up by 1795, located in most important American cities. Many leaders soon became active in Thomas Jefferson's Democratic-Republican Party, a national political party that he founded. As foreign affairs became dominant issues of the day, members of such groups opposed the British, rallied behind Jefferson, and proclaimed their friendship with the revolutionary French Republic.

== Activities ==
The societies usually met once a month, more often during election season. Applicants for membership had to have five members attest to their "firm and steadfast friend of EQUAL RIGHTS OF MAN" and a few members could blackball an applicant. "Apostasy from Republican principles" was ground for expulsion. Officers were rotated regularly, in one case every month.

The societies politicked in local elections officially or quietly. They often joined parades and celebrations of July 4 and were credited in 1794 with having made that day "more universally celebrated" than it had been. They also celebrated July 14, the French Bastille Day. Some societies engaged in direct action to help France in its war with Britain, such as by equipping French privateers.

Endless discussions and rounds of resolutions fill the minute books; most common were general addresses and resolutions critical of the Washington administration. In the western states, members of the societies agitated against the British for holding the frontier posts and against the Spanish for closing the Mississippi River. In the eastern states, they denounced Britain for "piracy" against American shipping. In the Carolinas, they demanded a uniform currency and adequate representation for the growing backcountry.

The societies strongly protested the excise tax on whiskey. They denounced John Jay as special envoy to London and vehemently repudiated Jay Treaty, which he signed. They complained about secret sessions of Congress and the state legislatures and demanded that public officials abandon the use of "dark, intricate, antiquated formalities" and "obsolete phraseology", which only lawyers and classical scholars could understand.

== Grievances ==
The societies viewed excessive power as the enemy of liberty and were wary of the undue corrupt accumulation of power in the central government. The Society of Newcastle, Delaware, stated, "If we consult the lamentable annals of mankind, and cast our eyes back over the historic page we shall find this solemn truth recorded in large characters; that all governments however free in their origin, have in the end degenerated into despotism". The societies adhered to Jeffersonian thought and believed that the infant nation was fragile and needed careful protection by a vigilant population. The societies feared that Hamilton's financial policies edged too closely to English aristocracy and saw them as “prescriptions of Aristocracy, under the masque of Federalism.” They opposed the growing class of commercial elites and speculators. One society in New York City stated that it had “less respect to the consuming speculator, who wallows in luxury, than to the productive mechanic who struggles with indigence”.

The societies grieved a lack of virtue and patriotism in the 1790s. They viewed "jealousy" and suspicion of the government not as protest, but as the duty of a virtuous vigilant citizen to maintain the republic. Tunis Wortman, secretary of the Democratic Society of New York, stated, “It is a truth too evident to be disguised, that since the completion and final establishment of our revolution, the flame of liberty has burned less bright, and become less universal in its operation. The charms of wealth, the allurements of luxury, the thirst for gain and the ruinous system of speculation, have borne down like the irresistible flood upon us, and have threatened destruction to the most valuable elements of social life:-the desire of affluence and the love of ease, have absorbed every honorable and patriotic consideration; have rendered us supine and indolent, and have nearly banished from our minds the sentiment of public virtue, destroyed the ardor of liberty, and diminished our attachment to the sacred interests of our country.”

== Doctrines ==
The societies preached equal justice and a general diffusion of knowledge as essential "pillars supporting the sacred temple of liberty". A primary purpose of the societies was to disseminate political information, as their members believed ignorance to be the greatest threat to democracy. They worked closely with republican newspaper editors by publishing numerous letters, editorials and essays.

"To support and perpetuate the EQUAL RIGHTS OF MAN" was the New York society's "great object", and toward that end, it would "constantly express our sentiments". The "Equal Rights of Man" meant to them the right to freedoms of speech, press, and assembly; the right to criticize governmental representatives and to demand an explanation of their public acts; and the right to publish their reactions in a free press.

Born from the grassroots organization of the Sons of Liberty, the societies challenged existing notions of the social and political hierarchy. The societies united disparate groups of people from different classes, usually the lower and middle classes, which were made up of farmers, artisans, mechanics, and common laborers were led by richer merchants, local politicians, militia captains, naval officers, doctors, lawyers, and printers. Their persistence of egalitarian and republican thought revolutionized ideas about liberty through the Jacksonian era and beyond.

The members often included dissenting teachers and theologians who were striving to create a more progressive, humanitarian, and enlightened society. Their ideas were also influenced by classical and modern republicanism, particularly the works of Aristotle and Machiavelli, and by the 'Common Sense' philosophy of the Scottish Enlightenment. That philosophy led the societies to oppose many of the Federalist Party's policies. The societies advocated both a system of publicly-funded and locally-controlled education for all classes and a broadening of the franchise. Standing to Jefferson's ideological left, they advocated a much more democratic political agenda than he supported, including attempts to create a permanent organization of popular dissent directed against the federal government and an educational philosophy based on a dialectical and democratic approach to learning.

=== Pennsylvania frontier and Whiskey Rebellion ===
Most societies were urban, but three formed on Pennsylvania's western frontier: the Democratic Republican Society of the County of Washington, the Society of United Freemen of Mingo Creek, and the Republican Society at the Mouth of the Youghiogheny. Members dreamed of a yeoman farmer empire and thought that the western farmers were exploited by wealthy easterners, particularly merchants and land speculators. They demanded justice and were careful not to address with deference those who possessed wealth and power. They considered the whiskey tax inspector John Neville, a reasonably-wealthy man, as an agent of their eastern enemies. James McFarlane, chairman of the Society of United Freemen, was killed while he was trying to force Neville's resignation, an event that triggered the Whiskey Rebellion.

== Decline ==
The Federalist Party opposed such groups and claimed that they had been started by Citizen Genêt as a tool of the revolutionary government in Paris. Members responded by claiming they were inspired by the Sons of Liberty, the Whig Clubs, and other republican groups of the 1770s. President Washington vehemently denounced the societies in late 1794. After his successful quelling of the Whiskey Rebellion. Washington complained that the Democratic-Republican societies in western Pennsylvania had helped to instigate the revolt and thus were enemies of the new government and nation. By 1796, most of the groups had disbanded.

As educational organizations, the societies had some influence. They believed that a republican nation required citizens to act together to deal with social problems at the grassroots. It considered the mobilized citizenry to be essential to defeat aristocracy, which they identified with Alexander Hamilton.
