= Blue Light Federalists =

Partisan nickname used during the War of 1812

Blue Light Federalists were members of the Federalist Party in New England who were alleged to have collaborated with the Royal Navy during the War of 1812. They supposedly used blue lanterns to alert British warships to American blockade runners, earning the name "blue light." The term was later applied more broadly by war hawks in the Democratic-Republican Party to refer to all Federalist opponents of the war, including tax protesters and secessionists.

During a thwarted attempt to run the British blockade at New London, Connecticut, Commodore Stephen Decatur claimed to have seen blue lights flashing from the Connecticut shore. He later alleged that these were signals to the British fleet to alert them of his plans.

Major general James Wilkinson accused the presiding judge of the St. Lawrence County, New York, Nathan Ford of signaling to British forces using a blue lantern during the invasion of Canada. Ford, a Federalist, was charged with treason and brought before the United States district court in New York City, but the charges were dismissed by the district court judge.

== Background ==
Anti-war sentiment was strongest in New England, where the Federalist Party led the opposition to the U.S. declaration of war against Britain. The region's primarily mercantile economy was hurt by the disruption of trade with Britain during the period of the embargo and the subsequent wartime naval blockade. Economic hardship fueled growing frustration with the war effort and increased calls for state-level resistance. Some Federalist leaders proposed measures ranging from nullification of federal military orders to constitutional amendments aimed at curbing Southern and Western influence. During the war, disputes between the New England states and the national government over the deployment of the militia contributed to ill-will between Federalists and the Madison administration.

== Legacy ==
"Blue Light Federalists" became a symbol of political disloyalty during and after the War of 1812, reinforcing deepening sectional and partisan divides in the early republic. Though there was never definitive proof that Federalists actually signaled British ships with blue lights, the accusation was widely circulated and used by Democratic-Republicans to delegitimize Federalist opposition to the war. The stigma of disloyalty, combined with the controversy surrounding the Hartford Convention, contributed to the dramatic decline in the Federalist Party after 1815.

== Bibliography ==
- Banner, James M. (1970). To the Hartford Convention: The Federalists and the Origins of Party Politics in Massachusetts, 1789–1815. New York: Alfred A. Knopf.
- Buel, Richard Jr. (1972). Securing the Revolution: Ideology in American Politics, 1789–1815. Ithaca, NY: Cornell University Press.
- Hickey, Donald R. (1989). The War of 1812: A Forgotten Conflict. Urbana, IL: University of Illinois Press.
- Mead, Walter Russell; Buel, Richard (2005). "America on the Brink: How the Political Struggle over the War of 1812 Almost Destroyed the Young Republic". Foreign Affairs. 84 (5): 174. doi:10.2307/20031731. ISSN 0015-7120.
- Taylor, Alan (2010). The Civil War of 1812: American Citizens, British Subjects, Irish Rebels, and Indian Allies. New York: Alfred A. Knopf.
- Wood, Gordon (2009). Empire of Liberty: A History of the Early Republic, 1789–1815. New York: Oxford University Press.
