= Charles Wells (American politician) =

American politician

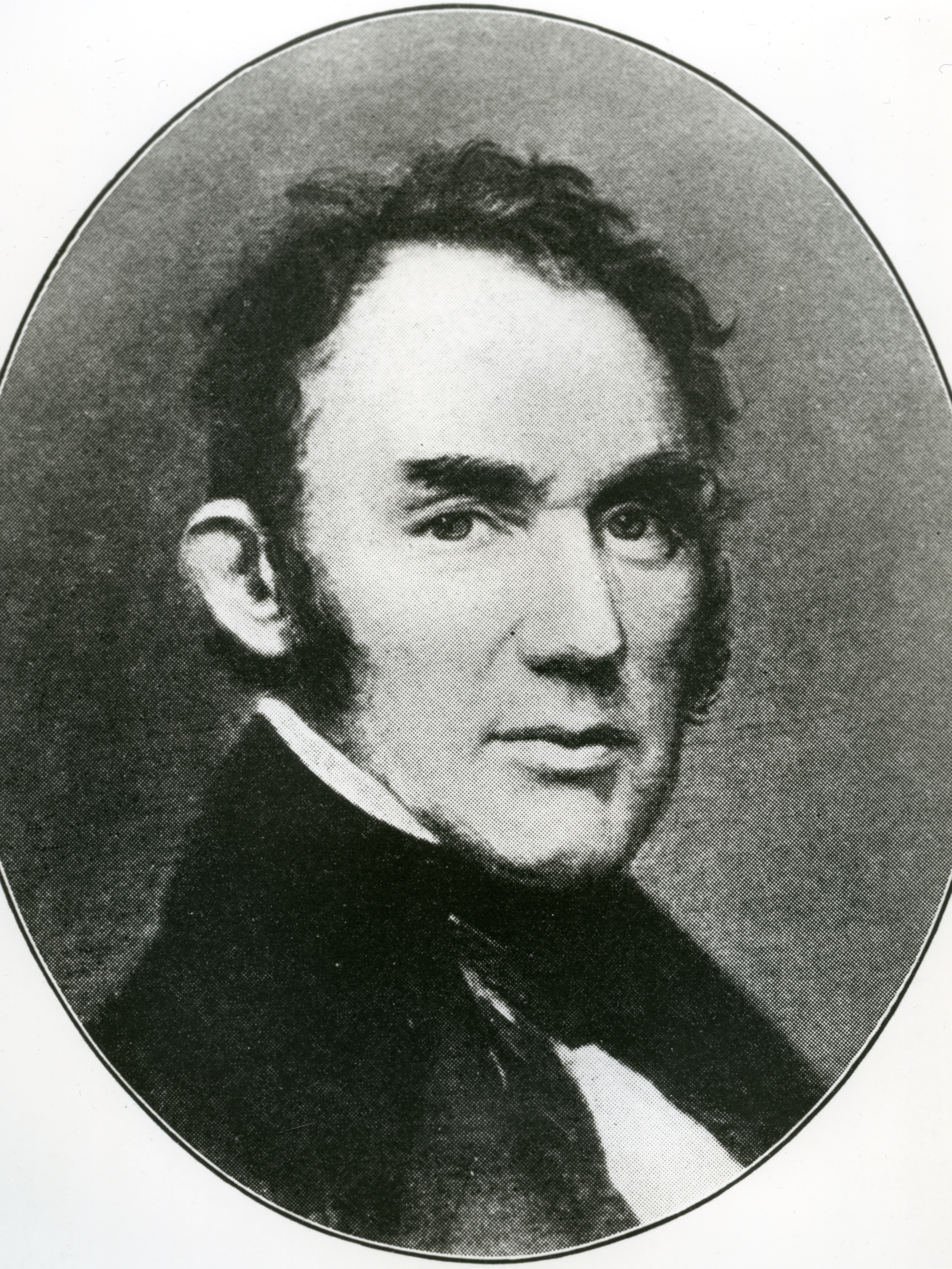

4th Mayor of Boston
- In office 1832–1834
- Preceded by: Harrison Gray Otis
- Succeeded by: Theodore Lyman

Member of the Massachusetts House of Representatives
- In office 1834
- In office 1826

Member of the Massachusetts Senate
- In office 1829–1832

Member of the Boston Board of Aldermen
- In office 1829–1830

Member of the Boston Common Council
- In office 1822

Personal details
- Born: December 30, 1786 Boston, Massachusetts<
- Died: June 3, 1866 (aged 79) Boston, Massachusetts
- Spouse: Nancy Gardner
- Children: 5
- Occupation: Mason

Charles Wells (December 30, 1786 – June 3, 1866) was an American politician, who served in both branches of the Massachusetts legislature, as a member of Boston's Common Council in 1822, on the Board of Aldermen from 1829 to 1830 and as the fourth mayor of Boston, Massachusetts from 1832 to 1834.

== Early life ==
Wells was born to Thomas and Elizabeth (White) Wells in Boston on December 30, 1786.

== Marriage and family ==
Wells married Nancy Gardner of Boston, the couple had two sons and three daughters.

== Mayoralty ==
Wells was mayor for two terms from 1832 to 1834. During his tenure as Mayor the Suffolk County court house was erected. Blackstone Street was laid out and Broad and Commercial Streets were extended.

== Massachusetts Charitable Mechanics Association ==
Wells was also the President of the Massachusetts Charitable Mechanic Association.

== See also ==
- Timeline of Boston, 1820s-1830s

Political offices
Preceded by Harrison Gray Otis	4th Mayor of Boston, Massachusetts; 1832–1833	Succeeded by Theodore Lyman
