= Racial separate schools in Canada =

Racial separate schools in Canada existed in some Canadian provinces from the mid-19th century to the mid-20th century. They were established by statute and did not have constitutional status.

== Indigenous peoples ==
The federal government adopted a policy of mandatory education of First Nations children, by amendments to the Indian Act in 1894. This resulted in the system of residential schools.

== British Columbia ==
In 1914, the Vancouver City Council adopted a resolution which required children of Chinese descent to be barred from public schools.

In July 1922, the Victoria School District passed a motion extending the segregation of Chinese students (previously in effect until grade 4) all the way to grade 7. This prompted a year-long school strike by the Chinese community of Victoria.

== New Brunswick ==
In August 1820, the first racially separate school, known as The African School, was opened in Saint John. This school was established because Black children were not allowed entry into the schools that white children attended. While there was no legislation enforcing segregation within the schooling system in New Brunswick, government officers abided by this racial social practice by providing grants for the establishment of segregated schools across New Brunswick. Segregated schools were opened in Loch Lomond in 1825, Fredericton in 1826, Kingsclear in 1831, Willow Grove in 1834, and Woodstock in 1866. The schools were in poor conditions and were prone to frequent closures because of insufficient grants to cover school expenses and a lack of teachers to educate the Black children. Attendance records filled by Matthew Thomas in January 1844, the teacher at the African School in Saint John, remarked that there were days without wood for heating; therefore, schooling could not occur. Additionally, after the resignation of Robert Lindsay Saunders from the segregated school in Willow Grove, the school was shut down for four years as no teachers were available to fill the vacant role. As a result of poor management of segregated schools and schooling in general within the province, The New Brunswick legislation passed the Commons School Act on May 17, 1871, to unify and centralize schooling within the province, which would provide free education to all children in New Brunswick. However, segregated schools were still in operation well into the 1910s.

== Nova Scotia ==
From 1836 in Nova Scotia, provincial legislation allowed for the establishment of separate schools for "Blacks or People of Colour". In 1870, the Halifax City Council enacted a by-law to exclude students of African descent from the common schools in the city. Black students continued to be barred from attending the public school in Halifax County until the 1960s, and as late as 1959 school buses would not stop to pick up students in Black neighbourhoods. By 1960, there would still be seven formal Black school districts and three additional exclusively Black schools in Nova Scotia. In 1983, the last Black school in Nova Scotia closed at Lincolnville, Guysborough County.

== Ontario ==
=== Separate schools in legislation ===
In 1849, Malcolm Cameron, a member of the Legislative Assembly of the Province of Canada, proposed a School Bill allowing for segregated schools. As a result of that bill, from 1850 in Upper Canada in the Province of Canada, provision was made for the establishment of separate schools for the Black community. In 1886, Ontario clarified its law, so that such establishment could only occur after an application had been made by at least five Black families in the community.

=== Black community advocacy against racial prejudice in education ===
==== Petition to the Governor General protesting segregated schooling ====
Instances of Black children in Canada West being excluded from public education occurred before the 1850 Act. A case in 1843 resulted in a petition signed by the "Coloured People of Hamilton" addressed to Governor-General, Charles T. Metcalfe, detailing their frustrations with the racial prejudice in their new home. The petition explains that the children of community members- many of whom arrived in Canada as freedom seekers, were continuously denied access to the same public schools attended by white children, and that community members sought redress from the Hamilton Board of Police to no avail. As taxpayers, the Black residents of Hamilton wanted confirmation of their rights to access, as their payments assisted in keeping the public schools operating.

After receiving the letter, Rev. Robert Murry from the Department of Education enlisted George S. Tiffany from the Hamilton Board of Police to assess the situation despite their previous involvement. Responding to Murry, Tiffany explained that “there is a strong prejudice existing amongst the lower orders of the whites against the coloured people,” and that people with such prejudice feared that parents of the white children would take them away if Black children were admitted into the schools. Tiffany ultimately advised against admitting Black children into public schools, stating, “it would not be advisable to yield to it, but that the law ought to be enforced without distinction of colour (...) if a firm stand be taken at first, the prejudice will soon give way.”

==== Hill v. School of Trustees of Camden and Zone ====
Alongside the 1850 Act, Ontario’s court system was used to uphold the practice of racial segregation within education, as parents of Black students denied admission to white schools often sued common school trustees. The case of Hill v. School of Trustees of Camden and Zone in the Court of Queen's Bench for Upper Canada is an example of this dynamic.

In this case, a Black man named Dennis Hill from the Camden Township wrote a letter to the Chief Superintendent for Education, Egerton Ryerson, detailing the racial discrimination his family faced by the trustees of School Section No. 3 in the Township of Camden County of Kent while attempting to admit their eleven-year-old son into a school with white children. According to Mr. Hill, school trustees denied his son entry into a school in his section on account of his race, while offering white children from outside the township and adjoining county attendance. Ryerson replied, stating, “I cannot express any opinion upon the case which you submit,” suggesting that, if there was no separate school for his son to attend, Hill should prosecute for damages.

The 1854 ruling on this case stated that Dennis Hill's children should attend a Black common school in the Dawn settlement near Dresden, called the British American Institute, which was a significant distance from their property.

Further examples of the Court's support for racially separate schools include remarks made by Chief Justice Beverly Robinson in the same 1854 court ruling. Robinson stated that "separate schools for coloured people were authorized, as the defendants have suggested, out of deference to the prejudices of the white population." He continued to describe these prejudices, noting that the language used in legislation, which corresponded with the prejudices of the white population, arose from "an apprehension that the children of the coloured people, many of whom have but lately escaped from a state of slavery, may be, in respect to morals and habits, unfortunately worse trained than the white children are in general, and that their children might suffer from the effects of bad example."

==== Mary Bibb ====
As activists, Mary Bibb and her husband, Henry Bibb, initiated various projects to serve and uplift Canada West’s growing Black population, including establishing a school in Sandwich. Mary Bibb established the school in the late winter of 1850, teaching twenty-five day and evening students in her home by January of the following year. Her class, taught in her makeshift classroom, would soon grow while lacking funds and resources. In an issue of The Voice of the Fugitive, Mary Bibb describes the conditions of the school as having started as an “ill ventilated room, uncomfortable seats, want of desks, books and all sorts of school apparatus.” The school was not without community support, with Bibb going on to thank various supporters for their contributions, including enabling the school to get a blackboard and books. Despite all efforts, the school ultimately closed down by 1852.

=== End of separate schools in Ontario ===
In Ontario, separate schools for Black students continued until 1891 in Chatham, 1893 in Sandwich, 1907 in Harrow, 1917 in Amherstburg, and 1965 in North Colchester and Essex. The laws in Ontario governing black separate schools were not repealed until the mid-1960s, and the last segregated schools to close were in Merlin, Ontario in 1965.

== See also ==
- Racism in Canada
