= Refugee Home Society =

The Refugee Home Society was an organization founded in Michigan and Ontario in 1851 that was designed to help former enslaved people become established in a community and remain free. It was located 20 miles from Windsor, Ontario, the border with the United States. The settlement provided purchase of land an easy terms, education, and a community with three churches by 1861.

== Background ==
The War of 1812 and Levi Coffin's visit to Upper Canada in 1844, led fugitive slaves come in great numbers to Amherstburg, Ontario, where American officers were station near Fort Malden, and to Windsor and Sandwich, Ontario by 1822. The African American refugees came to the area to farm the land and create successful lives. As a result, a number of settlements were created: Anderdon, Brion, Dawn, Dresden, Edgar, Elgin, Elmstead, Gambia, Gosfield, Gesto, Gilgal, Haiti Village, Harrow, Ontario, Little River, Marble Village, the Matthew settlement, Mt. Pleasant, New Canaan, Ontario, Puce, Ontario, Rochester, Shrewsbury, Ontario, Union, Ontario and the Refugee Home Society Settlement.

== Settlement ==
The Refugee Home Society Settlement was a proposal by Henry Bibb, founder of the Voice of the Fugitive newspaper. The American Missionary Association supported the idea. Henry and Mary E. Bibb managed society activities.

The Refugee Home Society Settlement was established in 1851 and supported by abolitionists in Michigan and Ontario. The money they raised was used to purchase 2,000 acres of land for settlement in Maidstone and Sandwich Township. Lots in the settlement were sold on easy terms. They provided necessary supplies, tools and training. They also offered protection from slave hunters, by being located 20 miles from Windsor. Mary Bibb established a school for children.

Settlers included John and Jane Walls, who were a former enslaved man and the wife of his deceased slaveholder, who left Rockingham County, North Carolina with her children to be able to live as a married couple. They lived on a farm in the settlement.

By 1861, three churches were established: African Methodist Episcopal Zion, Baptist, and British Methodist Episcopal. A school was built for the community of 60 families. The school was taught by Mr. Wheeler of Oberlin College. This settlement is now part of the John Freeman Walls Historic Site and Underground Railroad Museum.

== Decline ==
The Refugee Home Society was dissolved in 1864. Some families migrated to Haiti and others to various parts of Canada. The American Missionary Association withdrew its support of the Society. Its failure was likely due to its narrow and paternalistic land policies that unfortunately excluded a great deal of potentially capable settlers. This was combined with the failure to obtain any significant leadership among the settlers which resulted in corruption and discredited its reputation, but not before aiding thousands of other refugees.

== See also ==
- Lakeshore, Ontario § History
- List of Underground Railroad sites
