= Essex County, Ontario =

Essex County
- County (upper-tier)
- County of Essex; Comté d'Essex (French)
- Flag

- Location of Essex County in Ontario
- Coordinates: 42°10′31″N 82°46′50″W
- Country: Canada
- Province: Ontario
- Settled: 1749
- Named for: Essex, England
- County seat Local government: Town of Essex
- Municipalities: List: Amherstburg; Essex; Kingsville; Lakeshore; LaSalle; Tecumseh; Leamington

Government
  - Warden: Hilda McDonald
  - Deputy Warden: Joe Bachetti

Area
  - Land: 1,662.73 km^{2} (641.98 sq mi)

Population (2021)
  - Total: 192,970
- Time zone: UTC-5 (EST)
  - Summer (DST): UTC-4 (EDT)
- Area codes: 519/226/548
- Website: www.countyofessex.ca

Essex County is a primarily rural county in Southwestern Ontario, Canada comprising seven municipalities: Amherstburg, Kingsville, Lakeshore, LaSalle, Leamington, Tecumseh and the administrative seat, Essex.

== Administrative divisions ==
Essex County is composed of seven municipalities (in order of population):

- Municipality of Lakeshore
- Town of LaSalle
- Municipality of Leamington
- Town of Tecumseh
- Town of Amherstburg
- Town of Kingsville
- Town of Essex

The City of Windsor and the Township of Pelee are within the Essex census division but are not part of Essex County. The census division had a population of 422,860 as of 2021.

== Geography ==
Essex County is largely composed of clay-based soils, with sandy soils along the beaches and shores. For the most part, Essex County is flat farmland, with some woodlots. There is a small 30–50 foot (10–15 m) high ridge near Kingsville and Leamington in the southern part of the county, and large marshland near Hillman Marsh Conservation Area, and Point Pelee National Park. Lake St. Clair is located north, the Detroit River to the west, and the western basin of Lake Erie to the south.

=== Adjacent counties and municipalities ===
- Windsor (north)
- Across Lake St. Clair lies Macomb County, Michigan, US (north)
- Chatham-Kent (east)
- Wayne County, Michigan, US (west and northwest)
- Monroe County, Michigan, US (southwest)
- Across Lake Erie lie Lucas (southwest), Ottawa (south), and Erie (southeast) counties, Ohio, US

== Climate ==
Essex County hosts some of the warmest summer weather in Canada, given that it is the southernmost part of Canada. It has a humid continental climate (Köppen Dfa) with four distinct seasons and a localized maritime climate from the surrounding Great Lakes.

Average winters are wet and cold with a variety of conditions including rain, snow, freezing rain, sleet and fog. Temperatures and conditions change frequently during the winter months, with short periods of both bitter cold or mild weather. Winter storms are common but usually cause minimal disruption. Essex County resides outside of the Great Lakes snowbelt and doesn't experience intense lake-effect snow accumulation like other surrounding areas, although strong westerlies off Lake Michigan can sometimes push snow squalls into the area.

Summers are hot and humid with an abundance of sunny weather. Like the surrounding Midwestern United States, thunderstorms and severe weather are more frequent during the spring and summer months.

Climate data for Kingsville (1981−2010)
Month	Jan	Feb	Mar	Apr	May	Jun	Jul	Aug	Sep	Oct	Nov	Dec	Year
Record high °C (°F)	15.0 (59.0)	16.0 (60.8)	24.5 (76.1)	27.0 (80.6)	31.0 (87.8)	37.5 (99.5)	36.5 (97.7)	36.0 (96.8)	34.5 (94.1)	26.5 (79.7)	20.0 (68.0)	16.0 (60.8)	37.5 (99.5)
Mean daily maximum °C (°F)	−0.3 (31.5)	1.0 (33.8)	5.7 (42.3)	12.4 (54.3)	19.0 (66.2)	24.3 (75.7)	26.8 (80.2)	25.8 (78.4)	21.8 (71.2)	15.1 (59.2)	8.3 (46.9)	2.3 (36.1)	13.5 (56.3)
Daily mean °C (°F)	−3.7 (25.3)	−2.5 (27.5)	1.7 (35.1)	7.9 (46.2)	14.4 (57.9)	19.9 (67.8)	22.5 (72.5)	21.6 (70.9)	17.7 (63.9)	11.1 (52.0)	5.0 (41.0)	−0.6 (30.9)	9.6 (49.3)
Mean daily minimum °C (°F)	−7.1 (19.2)	−6.1 (21.0)	−2.3 (27.9)	3.4 (38.1)	9.8 (49.6)	15.6 (60.1)	18.3 (64.9)	17.3 (63.1)	13.5 (56.3)	7.1 (44.8)	1.8 (35.2)	−3.6 (25.5)	5.6 (42.1)
Record low °C (°F)	−29.0 (−20.2)	−26.0 (−14.8)	−22.0 (−7.6)	−13.0 (8.6)	−2.0 (28.4)	3.9 (39.0)	6.0 (42.8)	6.0 (42.8)	−0.6 (30.9)	−5.0 (23.0)	−11.5 (11.3)	−23.0 (−9.4)	−29.0 (−20.2)
Average precipitation mm (inches)	61.2 (2.41)	59.0 (2.32)	65.0 (2.56)	86.7 (3.41)	84.2 (3.31)	73.3 (2.89)	84.1 (3.31)	81.1 (3.19)	87.9 (3.46)	71.9 (2.83)	79.0 (3.11)	67.3 (2.65)	900.5 (35.45)
Average rainfall mm (inches)	32.9 (1.30)	36.8 (1.45)	49.7 (1.96)	84.3 (3.32)	84.2 (3.31)	73.3 (2.89)	84.1 (3.31)	81.1 (3.19)	87.9 (3.46)	71.9 (2.83)	76.4 (3.01)	51.9 (2.04)	814.2 (32.06)
Average snowfall cm (inches)	28.3 (11.1)	22.2 (8.7)	15.3 (6.0)	2.4 (0.9)	0.0 (0.0)	0.0 (0.0)	0.0 (0.0)	0.0 (0.0)	0.0 (0.0)	0.0 (0.0)	2.5 (1.0)	15.5 (6.1)	86.3 (34.0)
Average precipitation days (≥ 0.2 mm)	10.7	9.5	11.4	13.0	12.3	10.0	9.3	8.9	9.7	10.7	11.9	12.0	129.3
Average rainy days (≥ 0.2 mm)	4.6	5.3	8.5	12.4	12.3	10.0	9.3	8.9	9.7	10.7	11.3	8.2	111.1
Average snowy days (≥ 0.2 cm)	6.5	4.7	3.8	0.73	0.0	0.0	0.0	0.0	0.0	0.08	0.96	4.6	21.4
Source: Environment Canada

== History ==
=== Colonial settlement ===
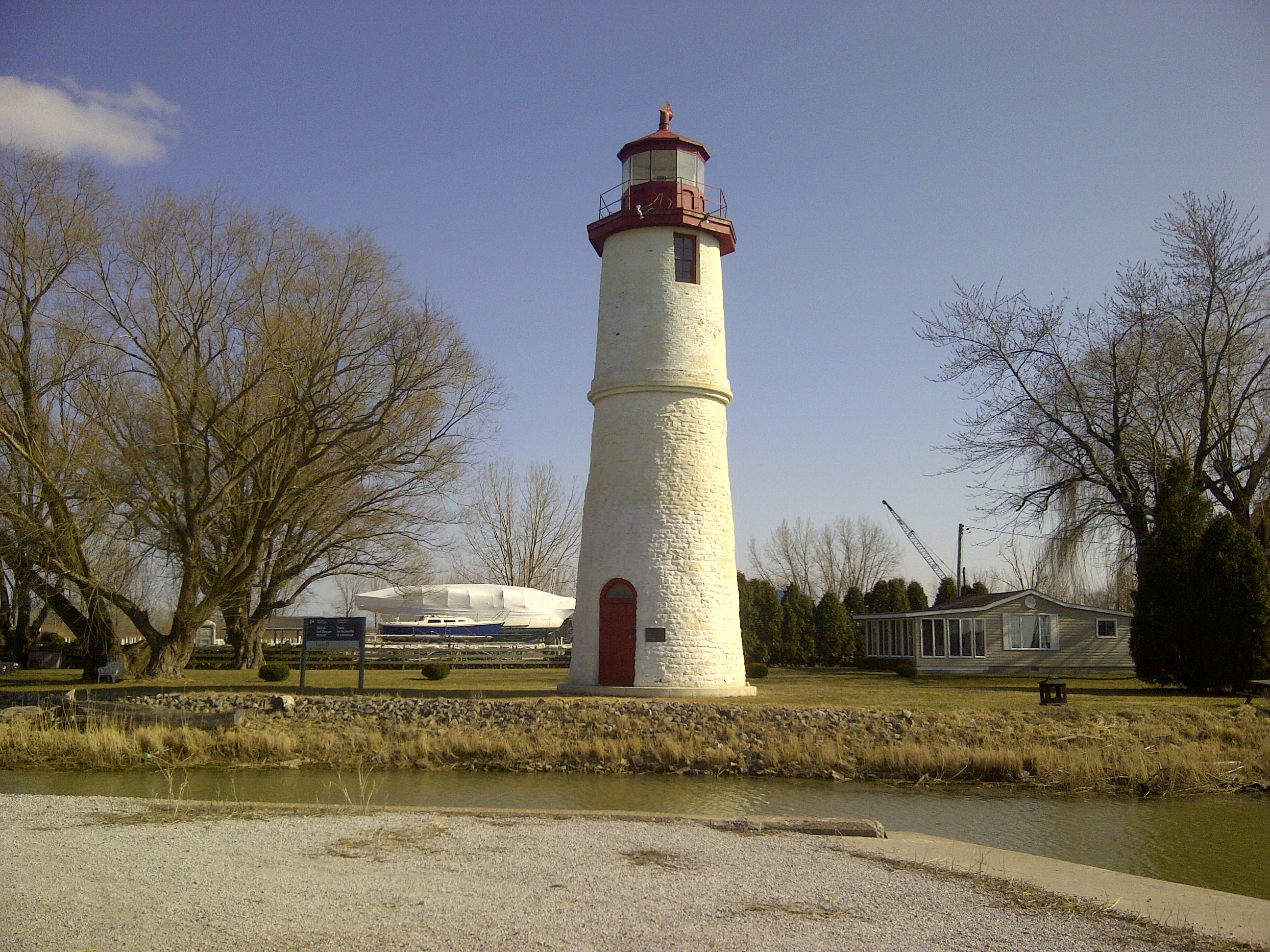
Thames River Lighthouse, in Essex County, Ontario, built in 1818.

The area that has come to be known as Essex was one of the first counties to be settled by non-indigenous people in Upper Canada, later to become Ontario. The settlements were mostly established by French settlers in the mid-18th century. Around 1749, the first permanent settlements began to appear on what is now the south or Canadian side of the Detroit River, across from the French Fort Detroit. They cultivated long, narrow plots of land along the river. Despite the name, this is not a river as such but rather a strait connecting Lake Huron and the smaller Lake Saint Clair in the north to Lake Erie in the south, as part of the Great Lakes.

Lower down the river, lands were occupied by native people known as Wyandot or Huron, around the Jesuit Catholic Mission of Bois Blanc (French for White Wood), opposite the island of the same name. The Mission was eventually abandoned and re-established closer to what became Sandwich Township after the British took over the French territory following the Seven Years' War. It was closer to the safety of the British-fortified Fort Detroit. When farmers arrived, they encountered difficulty in trying to clear the extremely thick forests that covered Essex County. The farmers grew to "hate" the trees, and chopped them down, starved them from nourishment by cutting deep gashes in the bark, and burned them to clear the way to get to the fertile soils underneath. The fires were so intense, that the reddish glow could be seen from Fort Chicago, 300 miles (500 km) away, as millions of cords of wood burned.

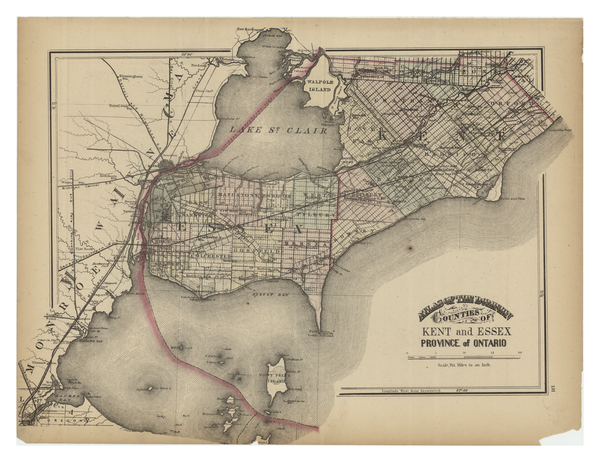
Historical map that includes Essex County (1875)

Settlement continued southward along the river and was known as Petite Côte (Small Coast), which was a reference to the shorter length of river frontage compared to the Detroit/American side. Landmarks were named for settler LaSalle and the local Ojibway, which continue to be in use. The first road in Ontario was laid out to connect the settlements, which is now over 200 years old and is known as Former King's Highway 18 (now County Road 20).

When river frontage along the Petite Côte was occupied, settlement began to extend toward Lake St. Clair, which became known as the "Assumption Settlement", for the name of its Catholic church. In the late 18th and early 19th centuries, the French ventured east along the south shore of Lake Saint Clair and settled in the present-day areas of Belle River (Belle-Rivière), Rochester, Tecumseh, Saint-Joachim and Stoney Point (Pointe-aux-Roches). These communities still have a large francophone population.

Amherstburg and Sandwich were the first towns established in Essex County, both in 1796 after the British finally ceded and evacuated Fort Detroit along the Detroit River under the terms of the "Jay Treaty". This was negotiated by John Jay, and signed in 1794 following the American Revolutionary War. It was intended to settle the US northern boundary with Canada. It upheld the original boundary lines along the Great Lakes between the US and Upper Canada by the Treaty of Paris of 1783 and the wider set of treaties known as the Peace of Paris, which ended the American Revolution (1775–1783) and overseas European and multi-continental wars. Britain ceded the territory of eastern North America to be the United States.

The British built Fort Malden near Amherstburg, opposite Bois Blanc Island, separating the British military presence from the more heavily populated area of Sandwich upstream, and positioned strategically to control the entrance of the river from Lake Erie and Lake Huron to the north. The populations of both towns were augmented by people immigrating from the southern United States after the American Revolutionary War (1775–1783), including from the new City of Detroit, who chose to remain British subjects, known as "Loyalists" or "United Empire Loyalists".

After the American Revolution, and the War of 1812 (1812–1815), which also was a confrontation over the northern border, some people continued to migrate north to the area. Settlers also arrived from the east seeking land, traveling by Lake Ontario and the St. Lawrence River of Lower Canada. Settlers began to move eastward along the north shore of Lake Erie.

The colonial government purchased land for development from the Indigenous in the southern half of the current county, located in the four townships formerly known as Gosfield North and South, and Colchester North and South. The British Court made land available for settlement, provided that the colonist complete certain improvements within a year and that it not be used for speculation. This area became known as the "New Settlement" (as compared to the "Old Settlement" of the towns of Amherstburg and Sandwich. Settlers in this area included Hessians who fought for the British against the American rebels, (especially known in history at the Battle of Trenton in New Jersey on the morning of December 26, 1776) and Pennsylvania Dutch pacifists (ethnic German Mennonites, many from Pennsylvania).

=== Formation of Essex County ===
In 1791, the province of Upper Canada was formed. In 1792, Upper Canada was divided into nineteen counties, of which Essex was the eighteenth and part of the Western District. At that time, the eastern boundary of Essex County extended further east into what is now Kent County. Settlement continued: on January 1, 1800, an Act for the Better Division of the Province established the Townships of Rochester, Mersea, Gosfield, Maidstone, Sandwich and Malden.

=== Settlement 1820 to 1870 ===
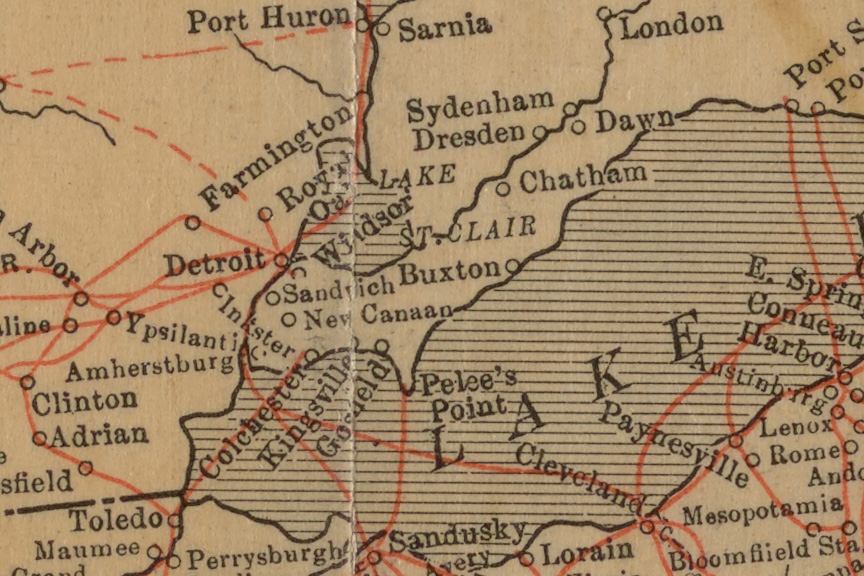
A number of settlements of Black slaves in Essex County are identified on this 1898 map of "Underground" Routes to Canada.

Longer roads began to appear in the county after the War of 1812, the first of which followed Indian trails. Colonel Thomas Talbot contributed to road development, and Talbot Road was named for him. Talbot Road followed a natural ridge of glacial moraine which stretched from Windsor to Point Pelee.

The establishment of good roads led to further settlement along the 'Middle Road' and in the area of what is now Leamington. Settlers of this era were often emigrants from Britain and Ireland; in the 1840s the Great Famine led to significant immigration. The village of Maidstone was the centre of the Irish community, and an area known as the "Scotch Colony" appeared along the shore of Lake St. Clair to the north.

In 1854 the Great Western Railway connected the Detroit frontier with the east, crossing Essex County. The Canadian terminal was in Windsor, which consequently forged ahead of the other towns of the county. Other railway lines were built that connected settlements in Kingsville, Harrow, Essex and Leamington.

Essex County was also a destination of the Underground Railroad. In the 19th-century Black Americans came to Essex county by way of Pelee's Point, Gosfield (now Kingsville), Colchester, Sandwich, and Windsor. Those who stayed in the area settled in the communities of Fort Malden, Sandwich, New Canaan, Mersea, and nearby Dawn Settlement (now Dresden), Buxton (now North Buxton and South Buxton), Chatham, and Elgin. The major settlement areas were Amherstburg and Windsor. The John Freeman Walls Historic Site in Maidstone (Lakeshore) is testament to this period. Many of the descendants of the fugitives moved back to the United States to support the Northerners (Union Army) in the American Civil War, (1861–1865), or to reconnect with family after emancipation. Many families stayed.

=== Late 19th century ===
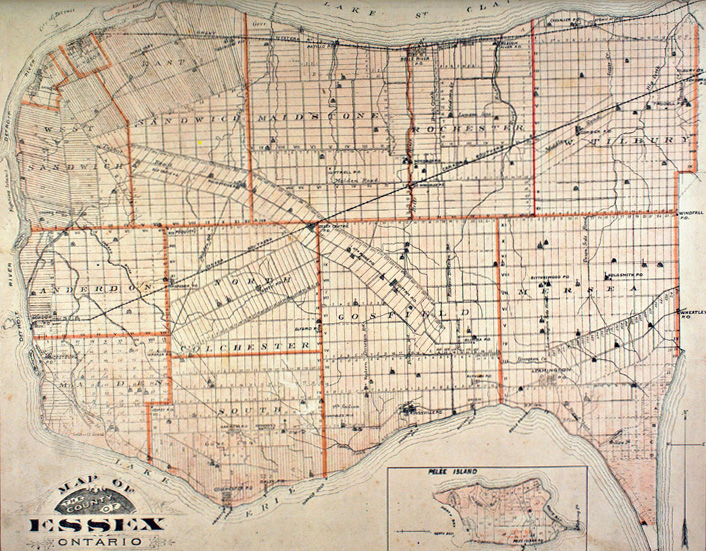
Map showing the townships of Essex County in 1881. From the Illustrated atlas of the Dominion of Canada.

By the late 19th century Essex County had seen fur trading and logging, land clearing and farming, road building and railway development, saw mills and gristmills, railway stations and water ports. By this time the forests were being removed to make way for farmland.

Also noticeable in some farmers' fields are oil pumps, particularly near Belle River and Leamington, in the northern and eastern parts of the county, respectively. This is from oil shale within the bedrock of the Marcellus Formation.

=== 20th Century ===
==== Essex County restructuring, 1990s ====
Flag of Essex County, in use until 2014.

In 1992, discussions began to take place to reduce the number of individual municipalities, which at the time numbered 21 in the county. This culminated on January 1, 1999, when a Minister's Order by the Ontario Minister of Municipal Affairs and Housing was implemented, putting in place the new municipal structure for the County of Essex.

Township	Township seat
Anderdon Township	Amherstburg
Colchester North	Essex
Colchester South	Harrow
Gosfield North	Cottam
Gosfield South	Kingsville
Maidstone	Belle River
Malden	Malden Centre
Mersea	Leamington
Rochester	St. Joachim
Sandwich East	Windsor
Sandwich South	Tecumseh
Sandwich West	LaSalle
Tilbury North	Stoney Point
Tilbury West	Comber

Townships:

- Anderdon - Now part of Amherstburg
- Colchester North - Now part of Essex
- Colchester South - Now part of Essex
- Gosfield North - Now part of Kingsville
- Gosfield South - Now part of Kingsville
- Maidstone - Now part of Lakeshore
- Malden - Now part of Amherstburg
- Mersea - Now part of Leamington
- Rochester - Now part of Lakeshore
- Sandwich East - Parts in Windsor and in Tecumseh
- Sandwich South - Now in Tecumseh
- Sandwich West - Parts in LaSalle and in Windsor
- Tilbury North - Now in Lakeshore
- Tilbury West - Now in Lakeshore

Towns:

- Amherstburg, Ontario (former town of, now merged with Anderdon Twp. and Malden Twp.)
- Belle River, Ontario
- Essex, Ontario (former town of, merged with Colchester N. Twp. and Colchester S. Twp.)
- Harrow, Ontario
- Kingsville, Ontario (former town of, merged with Gosfield N. Twp. and Gosfield S. Twp.)
- Lasalle, Ontario (former part of Sandwich Town)
- Leamington, Ontario (former town of, merged with Mersea Twp.)
- St. Clair Beach, Ontario
- Tecumseh, Ontario (former town of, merged with Sandwich S. Twp)

== Demographics ==
Historical populations
Year	Pop.	±%
1996	152,352	—
2001	165,501	+8.6%
2006	176,642	+6.7%
2011	177,720	+0.6%
2016	181,530	+2.1%
2021	192,970	+6.3%

As a census division in the 2021 Census of Population conducted by Statistics Canada, Essex County had a population of 422,860 living in 165,787 of its 174,446 total private dwellings, a change of 6% from its 2016 population of 398,953. With a land area of 1,844.21 km^{2} (712.05 sq mi), it had a population density of 229.3/km^{2} (593.9/sq mi) in 2021.

== Government ==
The County of Essex is governed by a County Council, whose members are the mayors and deputy mayors from the seven lower-tier municipalities of the county. The Head of Council is known as the Warden. The term of office for County Councillors and the Warden coincides with the frequency of municipal elections in Ontario, in other words a person elected to be Mayor of Leamington, for example, will be a member of County Council for the term that she or he is Mayor. Hilda MacDonald, Mayor of Leamington, was chosen to be Warden at the most recent election. A complete list (from 1853 to present) of the past Wardens of Essex County can be found online.

County government is responsible for issues that include transportation, community and social services (e.g. homes for the aged, child care, social housing), libraries, planning, emergency management coordination and corporate-wide business such as finance and taxation policies, general corporate policy and labour relations. The County does not have a police force or fire services, for which the seven municipalities are responsible.

== Education ==
English-language public education for kindergarten through secondary school grades in Essex County is administered by the Greater Essex County District School Board, along with the Windsor-Essex Catholic District School Board which oversees English-language Catholic education.

French-language public and Catholic education are overseen by the Conseil scolaire Viamonde and the Conseil scolaire catholique Providence respectively. The scope of all of these organizations includes both the County and the City of Windsor.

Until 1998 the Essex County Board of Education operated Anglophone secular public schools.

Public post-secondary education is available at the University of Windsor, St. Clair College, and more recently Collège Boréal.

== Infrastructure ==
=== Health care ===
==== Emergency medical services ====
Essex-Windsor Emergency Medical Services (EMS) provides pre-hospital treatment and transportation to over 45,000 patients per year. The service operates out of 12 bases, and employs over 260 Primary Care Paramedics. Essex-Windsor EMS covers all of Essex County, Windsor, and Pelee Island.

== Economy ==
=== Energy ===
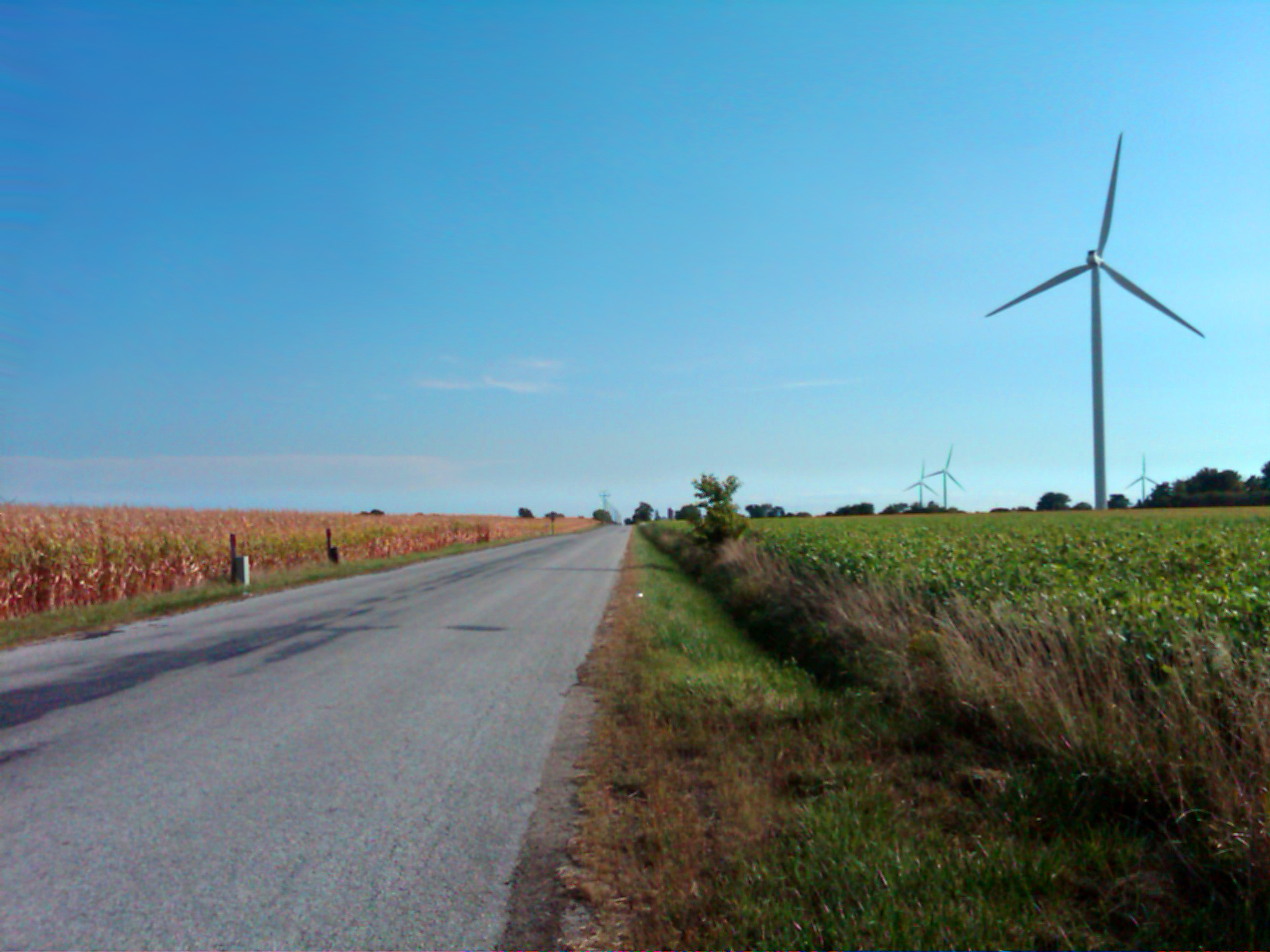
Wind turbines in Essex County, Ontario, Canada.

Essex County is home to Canada's largest wind farm as of June 2012. This is due to both its ideal wind conditions and abundance of available farmland.

=== Agriculture ===
Essex County has one of Canada's longest growing seasons at 212 days per year. Leamington, a town in Essex County, has also been known for its greenhouses. It now has the largest concentration of commercial greenhouses in all of North America, with nearly 2000 acres of greenhouse vegetable production in the general area. Major products of the greenhouse industry, in addition to tomatoes, are peppers, cannabis, cucumbers, roses, and other flowers.

Major employers include Highbury Canco, Aphria, FortDearborn, Highline Mushrooms, Elring-Klinger, Nature Fresh Farms, Hub International, Lakeside Produce and AMCO Farms.

=== Tourism ===
Essex County is home to 13 VQA wineries that are a part of Ontario's southernmost appellation. At the same latitude as the Mediterranean, the Lake Erie North Shore Region provides a unique climate in a continental region.

== Tartan ==
Essex County's Official Tartan.

Essex County also has an official tartan.

The tartan's colours correspond to different meanings.

- Golden/Yellow is meant to stand for sunshine, also for the rich agriculture and golden harvests of the many farmed plants (grains, corn, soybeans, barley, oats and wheat).
- Green stands for the spring fields around Essex County.
- Red represents tomatoes, as Leamington is the "Tomato Capital of Canada", and for other fruits, such as apples.
- Blue stands for the blue skies and the waterways of the county.
- Black is meant to represent the automotive industry that fuels Windsor and Essex County.
- White represents the salt mines in Windsor and western Essex County, and fish in the surrounding rivers and lakes.

== Notable people ==
- Bruce Crowder and Keith Crowder, retired NHL players
- Richie Hawtin, electronic music artist
- Jeff Lemire, comic book artist
- Jack Miner, naturalist
- Luke Willson, retired NFL player

== See also ==
- List of municipalities in Ontario
- List of townships in Ontario
- List of Underground Railroad sites
- Town of Kingsville
