= Hydrogen Council =

Belgium-based industry group

- Formation: January 17, 2017
- Type: Commercial Affiliation; CEO-level Advisory Body
- Purpose: Industrial Development
- Headquarters: Belgium
- Region served: Worldwide
- Website: hydrogencouncil.com

The Hydrogen Council is a group of 140 leading energy, transport, industry, and investment companies that seeks to develop the hydrogen economy. It aims to accelerate investment in the development and commercialization of the hydrogen and fuel cell sectors and encourage stakeholders to increase their backing of hydrogen as part of the future energy mix.

== Formation ==
The Hydrogen Council was launched at the World Economic Forum in Davos on January 7, 2017. In one of two formal statements made at the Forum, Air Liquide Chairman and CEO Benoît Potier stated that the aim of the initiative was “to explain why hydrogen emerges among the key solutions for the energy transition, in mobility as well as in the power, industrial and residential sectors.”

The 13 inaugural members included Air Liquide, Alstom, Anglo American, BMW, Daimler, Engie, Honda, Hyundai, Kawasaki, Linde, Shell, TotalEnergies and Toyota.

=== Members ===
In 2024, the Hydrogen Council consists of 140 members separated into three groups: the Steering Group, the Supporting Group, and the Investor Group.

==== Steering Group (52 members) ====
- Adani
- Abu Dhabi National Oil Company
- Air Liquide
- Air Products
- Airbus
- Anglo American
- Aramco
- Asahi Kasei
- Baker Hughes
- BMW
- Bosch
- BP
- CF Industries
- Chemours
- China Energy
- Cummins
- Enbridge
- ENEOS Corporation
- ENGIE
- ExxonMobil
- Faurecia
- General Motors
- Great Wall Motor
- Honda
- Hyundai Motor Company
- IHI
- InterContinental Energy
- Iwatani
- Johnson Matthey
- Kawasaki
- Larsen & Toubro
- Linde
- MASDAR
- Mercedes-Benz Group
- Michelin
- Microsoft
- Moeve
- MSC Group
- NextEra Energy
- OCI NV
- OPmobility
- Port of Rotterdam
- SABIC
- Sasol
- Schaeffler Group
- Shell
- Siemens Energy
- Sinopec
- SK
- SoCalGas
- Syensqo
- ThyssenKrupp-Nucera
- Topsoe
- TotalEnergies
- Toyota
- Valterra Platinum
- Yara Clean Ammonia

==== Supporting Group (68 members) ====
- 3M
- Advario
- AFC Energy
- Agfa
- Alfa Laval
- Alstom
- Avaada
- Ballard Power Systems
- Bekaert
- Black & Veatch
- Bloom Energy
- Bureau Veritas

--

- Chart Industries
- Chevron
- Clariant
- Cryogenmash
- Delek US
- Eberspächer
- ElringKlinger
- Enbridge
- Everllence
- Faber Cylinders
- First Element Fuel (True Zero)

(Note: Gas cylinders - Friuli-Venezia Giulia, Italy) (Note: Network of hydrogen refueling stations - California, US)

- Fortescue
- FuelCell Energy
- Galp
- WL Gore
- Haldor Topsoe
- Hexagon Composites (Note: Composite cylinder for storage and transportation of gases - Ålesund, Norway)
- Howden (Note: Air and gas handling solutions - Renfrew, GB)
- ILJIN Hysolus (Note: Hydrogen storage tanks - Jeollabuk-do, South Korea)
- Indian Oil Corporation
- Itochu
- John Cockerill
- Komatsu
- Liebherr
- Marle
- Mann+Hummel
- Marubeni
- Matrix Service Company (Note: Construction engineering - Oklahoma, US)
- McDermott
- McPhy (Note: Electrolyzer manufacturer - Drôme, France)
- Mitsubishi Corporation
- Mitsubishi Heavy Industries
- Mitsui & Co
- Nel Hydrogen
- NGK
- Nikola Motor
- NYK Line
- Parker Hannifin Corporation
- Petronas
- Plug Power
- Port of Rotterdam
- Power Assets Holdings
- Re-Fire Technology (Note: Fuel cell systems - Shanghai, China)
- Reliance Industries Limited
- Sinocat (Note: Catalysts and Hydrogen fuel cell electrocatalysts - Chengdu, China)
- SinoHytec (Note: Hydrogen fuel cell - Beijing, China)
- Sinoma
- Snam
- Southern California Gas
- Southern Company
- Subsea 7
- Sumitomo Corporation
- Technip Energies
- Tokyo Gas
- Toyota Tsusho
- TÜV SÜD
- Umicore
- Westport Fuel Systems (Note: Automotive fuel systems (natural gas, hydrogen) - British Columbia, Canada)
- Woodside Energy

==== Investor Group (12 members) ====
- Antin Infrastructure Partners
- Barclays
- BNP Paribas
- Crédit Agricole
- FiveT Hydrogen
- GIC
- Mubadala Investment Company
- Natixis
- Providence Asset Group
- Société Générale
- Sumitomo Mitsui Banking Corporation
- Temasek

=== Governance ===
The Hydrogen Council is steered by a core group of executives who meet annually at a CEO-level event. Ongoing governance is led by two co-chairs from different geographies and sectors, elected every two years by the council's Steering Members. Each year, one of the two co-chair mandates is renewed for continuity. The organization is steered by two co-secretaries (representatives of the two Co-Chairs).

=== Co-Chairs and Co-Secretaries ===
To date, the co-chair and Co-Secretary positions have been held by Air Liquide and Toyota (2017), Air Liquide, Hyundai (2018), and Air Liquide and Hyundai (2019).

=== Partners ===
As of November 2019, The Hydrogen Council lists its partners as the Center for Hydrogen Safety, the Clean Energy Ministerial, Energy Observer, H_{2} View, IEA Hydrogen, Mission Innovation and the World Economic Forum.

== Reports ==
The Hydrogen Council has published three reports, in collaboration with McKinsey & Company, that are available on their website.

=== How Hydrogen Empowers the Energy Transition ===
Published in January 2017, "How Hydrogen Empowers the Energy Transition" explores the seven roles of hydrogen in decarbonizing significant sectors of the economy and considers the policy environment needed to facilitate the deployment of hydrogen technology.

=== Hydrogen Scaling Up: A Sustainable Pathway for the Global Energy Transition ===
Published in November 2017, "Hydrogen, scaling up" suggests wide-scale deployment of hydrogen for the decarbonization of transport, industry, and buildings and enabling a renewable energy production and distribution system. The scenarios outlined in the report suggest that hydrogen technologies could contribute to meeting 18% of the world's final energy demands, avoiding 6 Gt of CO_{2} emissions, and creating a market with revenues of $2.5 trillion each year while providing 30 million jobs by mid-century. An investment of $280 billion – or annual investments of $20–25 billion until 2030 – would be required to build the hydrogen economy with these benefits.

Following the publication of this report, the EU, France, and South Korea published similar analyses, focusing on their specific regions.

=== Hydrogen Meets Digital ===
Published in September 2018, "Hydrogen Meets Digital" investigates the impact of digitization on energy demand to establish a dialogue with the ICT sector on how digitization and hydrogen could complement each other during the energy transition. The report concludes that hydrogen has substantial benefits that could enable major digital trends and thus serve as an efficient, zero-emission energy vector.

=== Path to Hydrogen Competitiveness: A Cost Perspective ===
Published in January 2020, "Path to Hydrogen Competitiveness: A Cost Perspective" provides evidence based on the path to cost competitiveness for 40 hydrogen technologies used in 35 applications. The report suggests that scale-up will be the biggest driver of cost reduction, with costs projected to decrease by up to 50% by 2030 for a wide range of applications.

== Events ==
=== CEO Events ===
The Hydrogen Council holds an annual CEO Event, where CEOs and C-suite representatives of member organizations meet to reflect on the work of the previous year and to brainstorm strategies to accelerate the council's mission going forward. To date, five CEO Events have taken place. The first was held at the World Economic Forum in Davos (2017), the second at the COP 23 in Bonn, Germany (2017), the third in San Francisco, USA (2018)., the fourth in Versailles in January 2020 and the last in a digital format in January 2021.

=== Side Events ===
The Hydrogen Council also hosted a number of side events that gathered CEOs and executives from member organizations alongside key stakeholders and influencers in the energy sector. Examples of such events include: 'New York: Investor Day, Celebrating Hydrogen in the Clean Energy Economy', 'China: Hydrogen Industry Development Innovation Forum', and 'Korea: International Hydrogen Energy Forum.'
