= Pierre-Étienne Franc =

- Citizenship: French
- Education: HEC Paris
- Organization: Hy24
- Title: Chief Executive Officer

Pierre-Etienne Franc is an entrepreneur and CEO of Hy24, an investment management company dedicated to low-carbon hydrogen energy.

== History ==
Pierre-Etienne Franc is an entrepreneur, co-founder and Chairman of FiveT Hydrogen, co-founder of the Hydrogen Council and CEO of Hy24, an investment management company dedicated to low-carbon hydrogen energy.

Before co-founding and becoming CEO of Hy24, Pierre-Etienne Franc joined Air Liquide in 1996. He was Director of the Group’s business unit dedicated to Markets and Advanced Technologies, where he headed industrial activities and investments linked to the energy transition, and Director of Air Liquide's global hydrogen energy business since 2010.

From 2017 to 2021, he was co-secretary of the Hydrogen Council, of which he is co-founder.

In 2021, he co-founded Hy24, an investment manager dedicated to low-carbon hydrogen, joint venture created by Ardian and FiveT Hydrogen[14].

== Bibliography ==
- "Sauver le monde pour le changer (et pas l'inverse)"("Save the world to change it (and not the other way around)"), 2025, Éditions de l'Aube, ISBN 978-2-8159-6834-8;
- "Hydrogène : la transition énergétique en marche" ("Hydrogen: the energy transition is underway"), 2015, Editions Manifestô, ISBN 978-2-07-262018-8;
- “Entreprise & Bien Commun” ("Business and the Common Good"), Pierre-Etienne Franc, Michel Calef, 2017, Éditions du Palio, ISBN 978-2-35449-081-2;
- "Le Management du Client" ("Client Management"), Pierre-Etienne Franc, Christopher Hogg, Eyrolles, 1994.
