= James Theodore Holly =

American bishop

James Holly
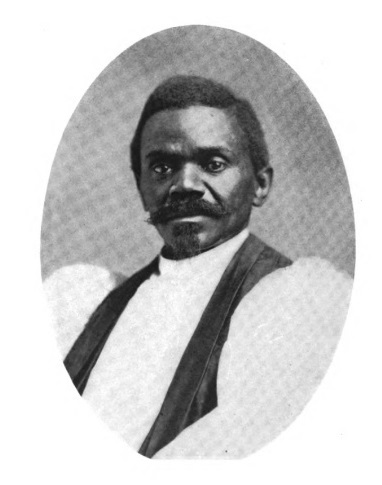
- Bishop Jack Holly

Bishop of Haiti, and of the Dominican Republic
- Born: James Theodore Holly; October 3, 1829; Washington, D.C., U.S.A.
- Died: March 13, 1911 (aged 81); Port-au-Prince, Haiti; Interred at St. Vincent's Home, Port-au-Prince
- Venerated in: Episcopal Church (United States)
- Feast: 13 March

James Theodore Augustus Holly (3 October 1829 in Washington, D.C. – 13 March 1911 in Port-au-Prince, Haiti) was the first African-American bishop in the Protestant Episcopal church, and spent most of his episcopal career as missionary bishop of Haiti.

== Early life and career ==
Holly's parents were freed slaves of African descent, and he was born and raised in Washington, D.C. He attended public and private schools. Holly was raised Catholic.

When he was 14, he moved with his parents to Brooklyn, New York, and his father taught him to be a shoemaker. While in the national capital and New York City, Holly met several prominent abolitionists, including Frederick Douglass, and by 1848 was working with Lewis Tappan. In 1850, he and his brother Joseph opened their own bootmaking shop.

In 1851 Holly married his wife Charlotte and also withdrew from the Catholic Church because it refused to ordain black priests. They joined the Protestant Episcopal Church in 1852. The young family soon moved to Windsor, Ontario, across from Detroit, where Holly helped Henry Bibb as associate editor of the Voice of the Fugitive, a weekly paper. Holly helped organize the Amherstburg Convention of free blacks in Canada. In 1854, Holly returned to the United States to become principal of a public school in Buffalo, New York.

He also attended the first National Emigration Convention in Cleveland that year as an Episcopalian, and became a commissioner of the National Emigration Board. Afterward, Holly traveled to Haiti for the first time, to explore possible emigration options there for free blacks. Holly knew that the American Colonization Society had supported the emigration of 6,000 African Americans to Haiti beginning in 1824, but that many had returned because of harsh conditions on the island. Holly believed that free blacks could avoid rampant discrimination by emigrating to Haiti, which had thrown off its colonial rulers, as well as that such emigration would help stabilize the society on the island of Hispaniola, which had experienced many coups. Although he many times requested a commission from the Board of Missions of the Episcopal Church to serve in Haiti, each was denied.

== Religious career ==
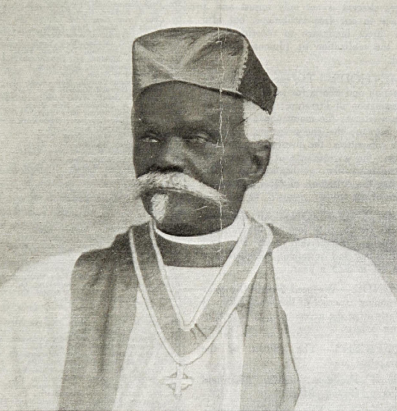
Portrait of Holly.

Holly studied theology and received holy orders. Ordered a deacon on 17 June 1855 at St. Mathew's Church in Detroit, he was ordained a priest on 2 January 1856 in New Haven, Connecticut. Meanwhile, Holly co-founded the Protestant Episcopal Society for Promoting the Extension of the Church Among Colored People, which worked to have the General Convention adopt a position against slavery and eventually became the Union of Black Episcopalians.

Holly served as rector of St. Luke's Church, New Haven, Connecticut, from 1856 until 1861, during which time he made several trips to Haiti, the world's first black republic. In 1857, he published a series of lectures as Vindication of the Capacity of the Negro Race for Self Governance and Civilized Progress and in 1859 he lobbied Congressman Frank Blair for funds to establish the emigrant colony. However, that was denied, and the Board of Missions also denied his fund-raising requests.

Holly resigned his position in New Haven in 1861, in order to lead 110 African Americans and Canadians to Haiti. Two weeks after his arrival, on June 13, 1861, President Geffrard signed a document declaring Holly a Haitian citizen. However, yellow fever, typhoid, malaria and poor living conditions plagued the emigrants. Holly lost his mother, wife and two of his children, among the forty-three prospective settlers who died during the first year. Many of the emigrants returned to the United States, despite the American Civil War.

Nonetheless, Holly remained in Haiti with his two sons and other dedicated American emigrants. By 1863, they established Holy Trinity Church and schools, and soon other churches as well as pastoral training and rural medicine programs. The Board of Missions began financially supporting the mission in 1865. Holly also served as consul for Liberia at Port-au-Prince from 1864 until 1874.

In that year Holly both received a D.D. from Howard University, Washington, D.C., and was consecrated as missionary bishop of Haiti in a ceremony at Grace Episcopal Church in New York. Presiding Bishop Benjamin Bosworth Smith presided over the ceremony, with the participation of his future successor Albert Lee and New York bishop Horatio Potter. Holly became the denomination's first African American ever consecrated, and only the second Black person to become a bishop in a major Protestant Christian denomination.

In 1878, Holly traveled to England as a delegate to the Lambeth Conference, but spent most of the rest of his life within his diocese, on the island of Hispaniola. He received the honorary legal degree (LL.D.) from Liberia College, Monrovia, Liberia in 1882. Holly also contributed reviews to the Church, the Church Eclectic, and the African Methodist Church. In 1897, Holly both published "Facts about the Church's Mission in Haiti", and was also named bishop of the Episcopal Church in the Dominican Republic (two years before the assassination of General Ulises Heureaux, who had brought relative peace to that portion of the island).

== Death and legacy ==
Jack Holly died in his diocese, at Port-au-Prince, Haiti on March 13, 1911, several months before the assassinations of Anténor Firmin in Haiti, and strongman Ramón Cáceres in the Dominican Republic.

These events plunged Hispaniola into another round of civil war, and eventually led to the United States occupation of the Dominican Republic (1916–24). The bishop is buried on the grounds of St. Vincent’s School for Handicapped Children in Port-au-Prince. In 1936, the Haitian government recognized Holly for his five decades of work for Haiti, 25 years after his death, and awarded him its highest honor, Commander in the National Order of Honor and Merit. The aftermath of the 2010 Haitian earthquake postponed plans to celebrate the 100th anniversary of his death.

The liturgical calendar of the Episcopal Church in the United States of America remembers Holly with an annual feast day (Lesser Feast) on March 13, the anniversary of his death, although some churches translate the celebration of his life and accomplishments to November 8, the anniversary of his ordination as well as less affected by Lenten observances.

== Works ==
- Holly, James Theodore. A Vindication of the Capacity of the Negro Race for Self-Government and Civilized Progress as Demonstrated by Historical Events of the Haytian Revolution; and Subsequent Acts of that People since their National Independence. New Haven: Afric-American Printing Co., 1857.
- Holly, James Theodore. Facts about the Church’s Mission in Haiti. 1897. Thomas Whittaker. New York.
- Holly, James Theodore and J. Dennis Harris. Black separatism and the Caribbean, 1860. University of Michigan Press and Longmans Canada. ISBN 0-472-45500-1.
