= Mary E. Bibb =

American educator and abolitionist

- Born: Mary Elizabeth Miles; 1820; Rhode Island
- Died: 1877 or the early 1880s (Note: She is said to have died in Brooklyn, New York in 1877, but may have been confused with another Mary Cary who was born about 1814.)
- Other names: Mary E. Cary, Mary Bibb Cary
- Education: Massachusetts State Normal School
- Occupations: Teacher, newspaper editor, abolitionist, businesswoman
- Known for: Among the first black women teachers in North America, editor of The Voice of the Fugitive
- Spouses: Henry Bibb (m. 1848; died 1854) Isaac N. Cary (m. 1859)

Mary Elizabeth (née Miles) Bibb (1820–1877 or the early 1880s) was an American-born educator and abolitionist leader. She is considered by some to be the first female Black journalist in Canada. She was a teacher and abolitionist in the United States, before moving with her husband Henry Bibb to Canada after the passage of the Fugitive Slave Act of 1850 which made it very easy for slavecatchers to capture fugitive and free Black people. She established schools for Black Canadians, published the Voice of the Fugitive newspaper, and helped African Americans get settled in Canada.

== Early life ==
The daughter of free black Quaker parents, she was born Mary Elizabeth Miles in Rhode Island around 1820. She began her studies at the Canterbury Female Boarding School, the first school for Black female teachers in the United States. After community opposition forced its closure in 1834, she studied at the Young Ladies' Domestic Seminary, in Clinton, New York. She continued at the Massachusetts State Normal School in Lexington (today Framingham State University), graduating in 1843. (Note: She is also said to have graduated from a normal school in Albany, New York.) The principal of that school was Samuel Joseph May, who supported women's rights and education for black people. He encouraged her to join the anti-slavery movement.

== Career and personal life ==
Bibb was one of the first Black woman teachers in North America and first taught in schools in Boston, and Philadelphia. Education was pivotal for African Americans to rise above low-paying menial labor and domestic services—like bootblacks, washerwomen, and table waiters—that kept them in the low class. Fellow female evangelist Maria W. Stewart believed that education was important to break through whites' prejudicial perceptions of Blacks. Bibb met many escaped slaves who told their stories about life in the South.

Mary Bibb, the wife of abolitionist Henry Bibb, who thanks to the work of historian Afua Cooper, can now take her place as an editor and producer of Canada’s first successful Black newspaper Voice of the Fugitive. Although her husband was on the periodical’s masthead, which got started in 1851, the mastermind behind the endeavor was Mary. With this acknowledgment the first two major Black Canadian newspapers were edited by women. In 1854, Mary Ann Shadd Cary started the Provincial Freemen and edited it alongside Samuel G. Ward and Rev. Alexander McArthur but much of the toil rested in her hands; and she was proceeded by editor Mary Bibb.

In Cincinnati, she taught at Gilmore High School. Beyond reading and writing, Gilmore's curriculum included Latin, Greek, art, and music. It prepared students, regardless of race, for college educations. She became involved in anti-slavery activities and, in 1847, met Henry Bibb, an escaped slave and abolitionist. In his narrative, he described his first impression of Mary E. Miles,

I had the good fortune to be introduced to the favor of a Miss Mary E. Miles, of Boston; a lady whom I had frequently heard very highly spoken of, for her activity and devotion to the anti-slavery cause, as well as her talents and learning, and benevolence in the cause of reforms, generally. I was very much impressed with the personal appearance of Miss Miles, and was deeply interested in our first interview, because I found that her principles and my own were nearly one and the same. I soon found by a few visits, as well as by letters, that she possessed moral principle, and frankness of disposition, which is often sought for but seldom found.

— Henry Bibb, Narrative of the Life and Adventures of Henry Bibb, An American Slave

She became Bibb's second wife in June 1848. The Fugitive Slave Act was passed in 1850, which allowed slaveholders to capture Black former enslaved people and enslave legally free people. With the publication of his narrative and the high-profile position as an anti-slavery lecturer, Henry Bibb was an easy target to be captured. Like many other African Americans, the Bibbs moved to Canada West (Ontario). They settled first in Sandwich (later named Windsor). The couple frequently took fugitives into their home who had arrived in Windsor via the Underground Railroad. Approximately 20,000 Black people settled in Canada between 1850 and 1860, hundreds of them coming through Sandwich on a daily basis, needing food, clothing, and shelter. The Bibbs asked for financial help from abolitionist and philanthropist Gerrit Smith and the American Missionary Association to establish a school and a newspaper to communicate the conditions of Africans and their flight from slavery.

In 1851, they began publishing a newspaper called Voice of the Fugitive, the first major newspaper targeted at Black Canadians. This newspaper was written and published in large part by Bibb while her husband Henry was on speaking tours. She wrote articles and shared interviews with newly-arrived fugitives in Canada. She was noted for giving the newspaper a polished editorial style. The Voice of the Fugitive is the first anti-slavery paper published in Canada written by African Americans.

Mary and Henry Bibb were leaders of the Refugee Home Society, which helped former slaves settle in Canada, providing them with land and building schools and churches. Mary taught school, educating both children and adults. In 1851, the Bibbs organized a North American Convention in Toronto on how free Black Americans and Canadians should respond to the Fugitive Slave Act. On October 9, 1853, the office of the Voice of the Fugitive newspaper was mysteriously burned to the ground. Mary and Henry tried to revive it, but Henry died suddenly in the summer of 1854 at the age of 39. In the late 1850s, Mary successfully opened up a school, then later opened a second school. She was a founding member of the Anti Slavery Society of Windsor.

Bibb married Isaac N. Cary on May 6, 1859, in Wentworth, Ontario. He was the brother-in-law of Mary Shadd Cary. They adopted a daughter, Forella Tucker. Bibb operated a store selling women’s accessories and apparel in Windsor from 1865 until 1871.

Bibb left Windsor for Brooklyn, New York, in the 1870s. After the end of the Civil War, Cary returned to Washington, D.C., where he was a marshall at the Police Court and was a board of schools trustee. In 1875, Bibb had a building renovated for a store in Washington, D.C., In 1880, Isaac N. Cary and his wife Mary E. Cary (whose parents were from Rhode Island) lived in Washington, D.C., with their adopted daughter Florilla Tucker.

Mary Bibb Cary died in Brooklyn, New York, in 1877, or just before her husband's death. Isaac N. Cary died on October 10, 1884, in Washington, D.C. Twice married, he was a widower with four daughters, two of whom lived in Canada.

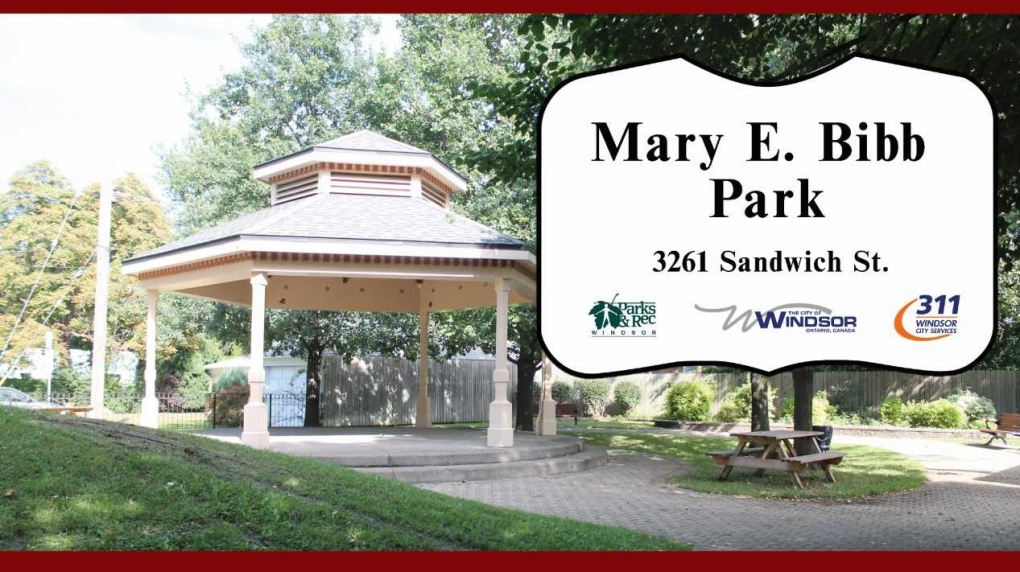
Mary E. Bibb Park Sign

== Legacy ==
In 2005, Mary and Henry Bibb were declared Persons of National Historic Significance by the Government of Canada.

In 2021, Sandwich Town Park is now Mary E. Bibb Park in celebration of Black History Month in Windsor, Ontario.

== Bibliography ==
- Tripp, Bernell E. (1993). "Mary Miles Bibb: Education and Moral Improvement in the Voice of the Fugitive" (PDF). Paper presented at the Annual Meeting of the Association for Education in Journalism and Mass Communication (76th, Kansas City, MO, August 11–14, 1993).
- Karolyn Smardz Frost and Veta Smith Tucker, ed. A Fluid Frontier: Slavery, Resistance, and the Underground Railroad in the Detroit River Borderland (Detroit, MI: Wayne State University Press, 2016), 138-143.
