= Jack Miner =

Canadian conservationist (1865–1944)

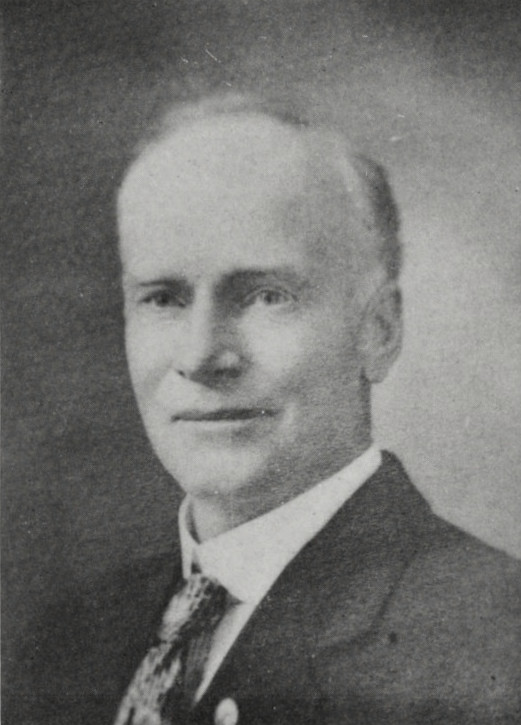
- Born: John Thomas Miner; April 10, 1865; Dover Township, Ohio
- Died: November 3, 1944 (aged 79); Gosfield South Township (now part of Kingsville, Ontario)
- Other name: Wild Goose Jack
- Occupations: trapper, hunter, farmer
- Known for: conservationism

John Thomas Miner, OBE (April 10, 1865 – November 3, 1944), or "Wild Goose Jack," was a Canadian conservationist called by some the "father" of North American conservationism.

== Biography ==
Born John Thomas Miner in Dover Township (Westlake), Ohio, he and his family moved in 1878 to Canada. Their home would be a free homestead at Gosfield South Township (part of Essex County), near Kingsville, Ontario. Miner's parents had emigrated from Leicestershire, England, in the mid-19th century, and John Thomas was the fifth of ten children. He did not receive a formal education and was illiterate until the age of 33. In the 1880s, he worked as a trapper and hunter to supplement his family's business income in the manufacture of tiles and bricks (from a claybed on their land).

Miner's first experiments with conservation took the form of erecting brushwood shelters and providing grain to bobwhite quail, which seemed to have difficulty surviving the winter. He also raised ringnecked pheasants. At last, he noticed that Canada geese were stopping at ponds on his land in spring on their migration northward.

In 1904, Miner created a pond on his farm with seven clipped, tame Canada geese, hoping to attract wild geese. It would take four years of effort before the wild geese finally began to settle at Miner's sanctuary. In 1911 and onwards, geese and ducks were arriving in large numbers, and Miner increased the size of his pond. In 1913, the entire homestead had become a bird sanctuary. The provincial government of Ontario provided funding for Miner's project, allowing him to add evergreen trees and shrubs, and to dig more ponds and surround them with sheltering groves.

== Migratory bird banding ==
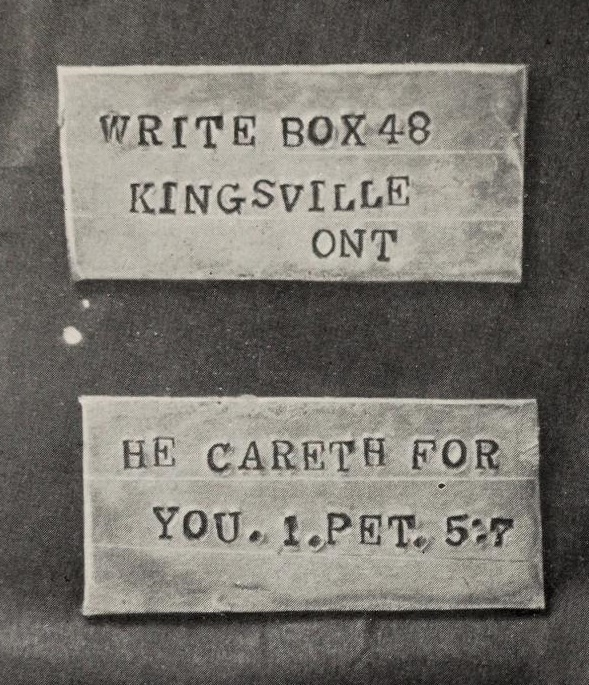
A band used by Miner with his signature biblical inscription

Miner was one of the first conservationists to determine the migratory paths of birds. In August 1909, he constructed a successful duck trap. His subject was banding with his own hand-stamped aluminum band. Along with address information, his bird tags quoted scripture: "Keep yourselves in the love of God—Jude 1-21" and "With God all things are possible—Mark 10-27". Late that year, his original band was recovered in Anderson, South Carolina. This marked the first complete record for banding migratory birds.

In the spring of 1915, Jack Miner successfully adapted his trap to capture Canada geese. He conceived a trap with two separate ponds, adjoined by a canal. The canal was covered with network and fitted to trap doors at either terminus. At the time, it was not known where geese made their summer roost. Only a general northward direction was known from settler reports in Northern Ontario.

Miner's captured goose was fitted with a tag giving the postal address of the conservationist. Subsequently, in October of the same year, Jack Miner received a letter from the Hudson's Bay Company in Moose Factory, complete with his tag. The letter indicated that the goose had been killed by a Native American in the Hudson Bay District.

This initial success and increasing interest nationwide spurred on an expansion of the tagging operation. In 1916, hundreds of geese were tagged, along with various other waterfowl. By the fall, tags were coming in from all along the eastern shore of James Bay, Hudson Bay, and as far abroad as Baffin Island. A second route south into the United States followed the Mississippi Flyaway, into states such as North and South Carolina, Georgia, Alabama and the gulf coasts of Florida. Often, these tags were returned by poachers, curious Native Americans or the Royal Canadian Mounted Police. Using information garnered from these returned bands, the migratory habits of Canada geese were mapped.

Miner's religious inscriptions garnered the interests of active missionaries. This provided an avenue for their return outside of game hunters in the Hudson Bay region. On one occasion, Reverend W. G. Walton, an Anglican missionary, hand delivered a pocketful of tags from Hudson's Bay. He had received these tags from as far as Baffin Island from natives.

Thousands of subsequent bird taggings over the following years produced copious data that would help to establish the U.S. Migratory Bird Treaty Act of 1918, representing an agreement between six nations making it unlawful to capture, sell, or kill certain migratory birds.

In 1923, Miner published an account of his banding methods and waterfowl conservation studies in Jack Miner and the Birds. It was very popular: all 4000 copies of the first print-run sold out in nine months. The book is still in print.

== Public outreach ==
In 1910, Miner began a lifelong career of lecturing. He spoke about wildlife conservation and the need for the establishment of sanctuaries and wildlife refuges, and told of his banding, research, and habitat preservation methods. He encouraged junior bird clubs and the building of bird boxes, and expressed his concern about the declining ecological condition of the Great Lakes.

Despite his conservation ethic, Miner called for the extermination of some species based on their non-monogamous reproductive habits. He disliked predatory animals, and a New York Times article of the late 1920s defending crows indicated that Miner had killed hundreds of them. In 1931, Miner embarked on a campaign to reduce owl and hawk populations in Ontario because he believed they were threatening small animal populations. A naturalist group in Toronto called the Brodie Club published a pamphlet entitled The Brodie Club Examines Jack Miner's "Facts About Hawks". Miner was furious about this and tried to sue for libel. However the Brodie Club had no officers so there was no one to sue.

== Conservation ethic ==
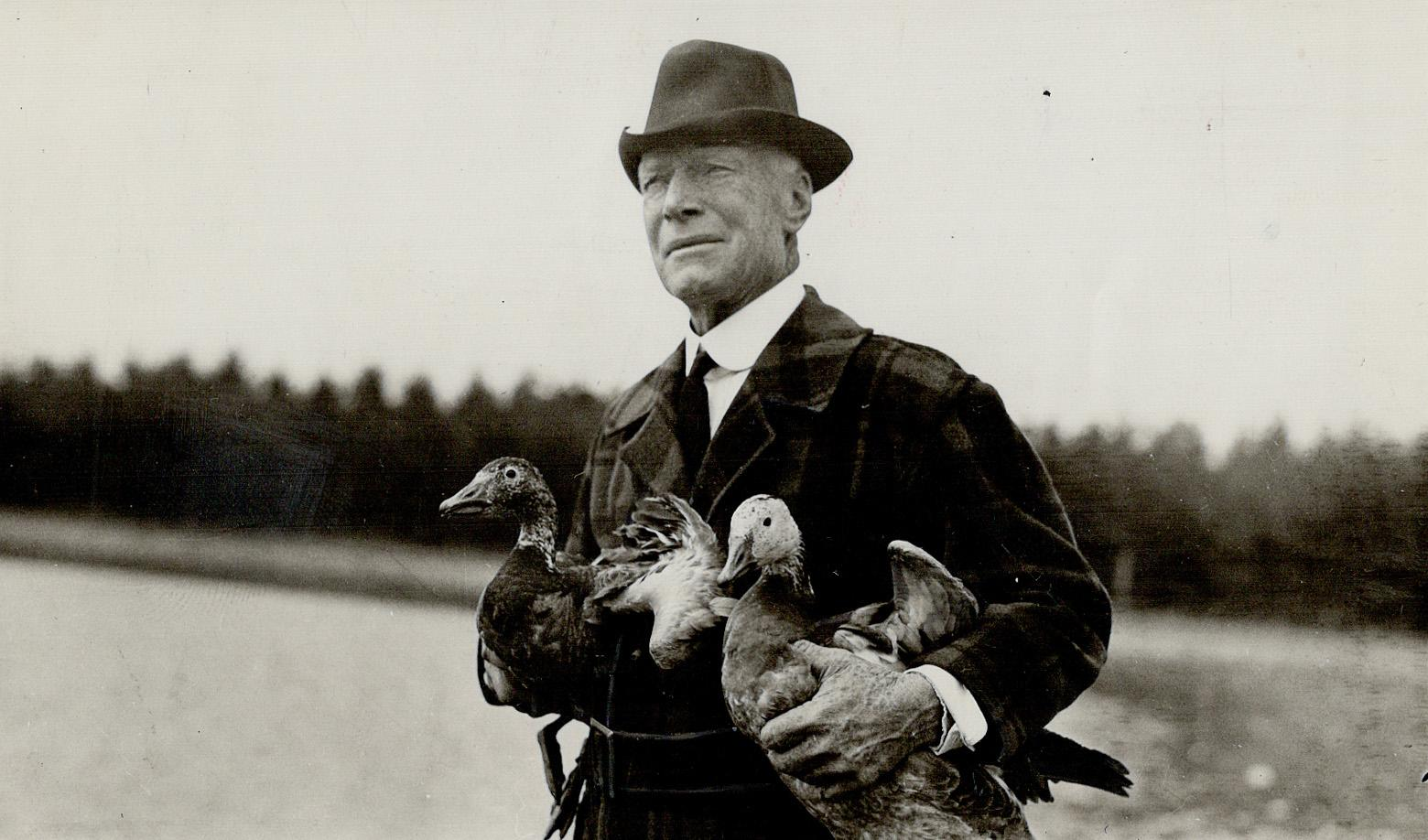
Miner about to release a pair of blue geese that have been banded to study their migratory routes

Miner's conservation ethic was unique in the sense that it was informed by both his Christian religious beliefs and his own biological observations. Miner's faith played a central role in shaping his ideas about conservation and more generally, the natural world, by working out of a creationist foundation. In a posthumously published article, Miner explicitly rejects evolutionary biology, ascribing to a literal interpretation of Biblical scripture. Drawing from Christian scripture, Miner came to form a worldview situating humans as holding dominion over the natural world. Indeed, his son Manly Miner describes the core belief of his father's environmental philosophy as being that "God put birds and animals here for man's use and for man to control." In this sense, for Miner, humans were charged with playing an active and protective role in conservation and ecological preservation.

Miner's religious faith is necessary for understanding his beliefs and methods of conservation. He viewed natural and biological relationships as consisting of a moral element, an idea that is illustrated in his classification of animals based on perceived human characteristics. Indeed, Miner admired the qualities of industriousness found in robins and the motherly care of ducks. He praised the monogamous mating relationships and loyalty of the Canada goose while criticizing the tendency for drakes to leave their mate when she begins nesting. In contrast to his class of morally good animals, was a group of animals that he considered to be morally bad. This group included natural predators, whom he described as being "cold-blooded," "cannibals," (when referring to predatory birds) and "murderers." The natural instincts of predators were to Miner moral dimensions and the language he uses when describing encounters with predators certainly illustrates this. In one instance, Miner writes of "seeking revenge" on an owl that had killed one of his geese. Indeed, Miner did seek revenge on the predatory birds that threatened the creatures he admired so much. He describes the delivery of trapped live crows to gun clubs to be used for target shooting, a practice which he suggests as a punishment for their "murdering" of young quail and sparrows.

While Miner's work has been an important part of wildlife conservation in Canada, it was selective conservation, influenced by both the religiously derived moral qualities of wildlife and the anthropocentric view of the natural world as being an object of control and management for human beings.

== Banding practice ==
Perhaps Miner's most significant contribution to the conservation movement was his practice of banding ducks and geese. Although his son claims that Jack was the first person to band birds in North America, it had been introduced by American Leon J. Cole several years earlier. Miner had begun banding ducks and geese in August, 1909. He banded his first duck with a hand-stamped aluminum band, which was recovered five months later in Anderson, South Carolina, constituting the first complete banding record. His bird tags quoted scripture: "Keep yourselves in the love of God—Jude 1-21" and "With God all things are possible—Mark 10-27". The inclusion of scripture on his bands was again indicative of the influence of Miner's faith on his conservation methods. Indeed, in an entry titled "Birds as Missionary Messengers," Miner describes Canada geese as just that, recounting a visit by a missionary from the Canadian North who had been given bands from the local Inuit for interpretation and of a letter sent to him from inmates in an Arkansas prison who had taken interest in the unique method of banding. This unconventional method of banding, it is suggested, helped generate increased interest and participation in the project. Miner's method of banding, however, was at odds with the attempt to standardize bird-banding practices by the American Bird Banding Association. Indeed, in spite of external pressure, the Jack Miner Migratory Bird Foundation did not adopt the standardized methods until after his death.

Though he cannot be credited with pioneering the process, Jack Miner's impact on bird banding was significant. His unique methods of banding and his celebrity status helped to popularize a practice that was in its infancy at the time. The thousands of subsequent bird taggings over the following years produced copious data that would help to establish the U.S. Migratory Bird Treaty Act of 1918, representing an agreement between six nations making it unlawful to capture, sell, or kill certain migratory birds.

== Legacy ==
The Jack Miner Bird Sanctuary was one of the first of its kind in North America, and remains in existence today. It is located near Kingsville in Essex County, Ontario, resting on a peninsula between Lake Erie to the south and Lake Saint Clair to the north. It is 16 kilometres away from the well-known birding destination Point Pelee National Park, which Miner helped to designate as a national park in 1918. (The "Atlantic" and "Mississippi" migratory flyways converge in this area.)

Jack Miner died in 1944. He had been presented with the Order of the British Empire (OBE) by King George VI in 1943 "for the greatest achievement in conservation in the British Empire." In his lifetime, he had banded over 50,000 wild ducks and 40,000 Canada geese. Several U.S. newspapers rated him among the best-known men on the continent, among Henry Ford, Thomas Edison, Charles Lindbergh and Eddie Rickenbacker. In 1947, Canada's National Wildlife Week Act passed unanimously to be observed the week of Jack Miner's birth, April 10 each year.

The first school to be named after the legendary conservationist was built in 1956 and renamed Jack Miner Public School in 1968. The school closed in July 2024 but the building remains just a few kilometres from Miner's sanctuary in what was Gosfield South Township. A school in the name of Jack Miner was created in 2001 in Whitby, Ontario, administered by the Durham District School Board. There is also a Jack Miner Senior Public School in Guildwood in city of Scarborough, ON.

The Town of Kingsville Ontario celebrates the life and legacy of Jack Miner in an Annual Fall Migration Festival.
