= Voice of the Fugitive =

19th-century Canadian newspaper

- Publisher: Henry Bibb and Mary E. Bibb
- Editor: Henry Bibb; J.T. Holly
- Founded: 1851
- Ceased publication: 1853
- City: Windsor, Ontario
- Country: Canada
- OCLC number: 11509720

Voice of the Fugitive was Canada's first Black newspaper that was directed towards freedom seekers and Black refugees from the United States.

Founded and edited by Henry Bibb and his wife Mary Bibb, it was first published on January 1, 1851, in Sandwich, Ontario and moved to Windsor shortly after. The paper was published on a bi-weekly schedule on Wednesdays, where it was priced at $1 per year. The paper was available across Ontario and made its way to America's Northern States such as Michigan, New York, Pennsylvania and Ohio. In 1852, James Theodore Holly joined the newspaper as co-owner and co-editor, and was officially named as "corresponding editor and travelling agent". This helped Bibb to actively engage with other political and charitable commitments, speaking duties and other writing engagements. Despite Mary Bibb not being listed as a co-editor, she actively contributed to the paper. Mary Bibb had written several articles, connected with a network of abolitionists in northern states within the U.S to obtain more subscribers all while also taking on the role as an editor and publisher when her husband was away.

The paper had focused on a range of topics that were important within Canada's growing Black population, such as the activities of the Underground Railroad, abolitionist work both in Upper Canada and the U.S., resources for newly arrived Black refugees and more. Additionally, Henry Bibb had often used the paper to advocate against the dependence of charity from Canada's White community and believed in segregated land settlements built only for the Black community. The paper also sought to reinforce the notion that Upper Canada was a favourable place to migrate for Black refugees and that they should take part in their new communities upon arrival. The paper had been a source to help Black refugees adjust to their new lives.

On October 9, 1853, Henry Bibb's printing office had been damaged by a fire. This event proved to be a devastating tragedy, as the paper never fully recovered. Bibb asserted that it was a result of arson. However, Bibb began printing again in November, printing a one page sheet only. The Bibbs attempted to revive the paper until Henry Bibb's unanticipated death on August 1, 1854.

Frederick Douglass said the newspaper was a "spirited little sheet, devoted to the cause of fugitives in Canada".

== Creation ==
The paper's target audience were freedom seekers who most often had escaped enslavement using the Underground Railroad during the mid-19th century. This era in Upper Canada (present day Ontario) had seen an influx in Black migration, due to the enactment of the Fugitive Slave Act of 1850. Article IV, Section 2 of the act specified that individuals who still owe labour to another (such as the enslaved) cannot be pardoned from their labour upon their escape. As a result, thousands of freedom seekers, often regarded as "fugitive slaves", had escaped to Canada. During the 1850s, it is estimated that between 15 000 to 20 000 freedom seekers entered Canada. In their new freedom, Black people settled in cities/communities in Upper Canada such as London, Chatham, Windsor, Toronto, Buxton and Dresden.

The Fugitive Slave Act had adapted the "fugitive" identity upon Black freedom seekers, criminalizing their fight for freedom. With an increasing Black population flowing into the province, some White Canadians were frustrated with their sudden arrival. As a result, newspapers articles focused on antagonizing freedom seekers were frequently distributed. Through editorials, letters and advertisements written in newspapers such as the Canada Oak and The Hamilton Spectator, freedom seekers were often subject to racist propaganda. With a growing need for a Black-owned and operated press, The Voice of the Fugitive was created by the Bibbs. The paper was designed with the goals of providing news, identity and strength to the Black community in Upper Canada. The paper also provided news about the United States in its relation to enslavement, the lives of Black refugees in Canada and providing details on the groups, organizations and the people who are helping with their transitions to Canada.

In the first paper printed on January 1, 1851, on page 2, Bibb stated that "We shall advocate the immediate and unconditional abolition of chattel slavery everywhere, but especially on American soil. We shall also persuade, as far as it may be practicable, every oppressed person of color in the United States to settle in Canada.”

== Transnationalism, abolitionism and separatism ==
The Voice of the Fugitive operated on a transnational approach where Black abolitionists could create relationships with communities in Canada and the U.S. Through the paper, Bibb had maintained ties with abolitionists such as Samuel Ringgold Ward, Frederick Douglass, Martin Delany, William Still, Henry Highland Garnet, Jermain Loguen and more. Through these connections from across the U.S./Canadian border, the paper was able to reach a larger audience throughout North America. These connections also allowed for information to be shared about the status of the abolitionist movement among communities in Upper Canada and the U.S.

The paper facilitated important discussions on enslavement and abolitionism within North America. In various articles, Bibb and his team reported on stories, events and improvements surrounding freedom seekers, Black refugees and Black settlements in Canada. Additionally, the paper advocated for temperance within the Black community, re-printed editorials from the American press focused on enslavement and abolition, while also discussing religion and education within the Black community. The Voice of the Fugitive also provided updates on the affairs of the Underground Railroad, new arrivals of Black refugees along with the activities of Black communities in Canada. Additionally, the paper had helped Black refugees to locate their friends and relatives. In some publications, Bibb urged enslaved Black people to migrate to Upper Canada where they could start new lives. Letters written by freedom seekers, abolitionists and refugees were often seen in some publications. These letters ranged in topics, where some discussed the lives of Black people settling into their new communities in Canada (e.g. Hiram Wilson's letter from St. Catharines, published on December 3, 1851, on page 1) while some letters included thoughts on the Fugitive Slave Act of 1850 (e.g. letter included in issue distributed on May 7, 1851, on page 2). The paper essentially documented events, movements and opportunities that all helped to further enhance the Black community in Upper Canada.

The paper also included many passionate editorials by Bibb that focused on plans of separate commercial and agricultural ventures for Black migrants in Upper Canada. This was not accepted within the Black community collectively as many Black refugees aimed at being accepted within the Canadian community on a whole. The idea of separatism seemed counterproductive to the Black community. Despite Bibb's editorials and the popularity of the paper, many from the Black community continued to support ideas of assimilation and integration.

Overall, the Voice of the Fugitive was a medium that filled a void for freedom seekers and Black refugees settling in Upper Canada in the early 1850s.

== See also ==
- Abolitionist publications
