= John Freeman Walls Historic Site =

Coordinates: 42.26198°N 82.78752°W

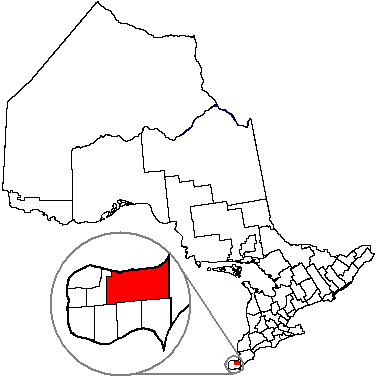
Lakeshore, Ontario (inset in red) where the John Freeman Walls Historic Site and Underground Railroad Museum are located

The John Freeman Walls Historic Site and Underground Railroad Museum is a 20-acre (81,000 m^{2}) historical site located in Puce, now Lakeshore, Ontario, about 40 km east of Windsor. Today, many of the original buildings remain, and in 1985, the site was opened as an Underground Railroad museum. The site forms part of the African-Canadian Heritage Tour in Southern Ontario.

== Background ==
=== Underground Railroad ===
The Underground Railroad was a series of routes that were established to hide and transport former slaves escaping servitude from the Southern United States. More specifically, it was a web of hidden, interconnected, man-made paths that were shrouded by forests and brush which assisted in the concealment of former slaves until they could reach a terminal location. The routes all headed north and towards the free soil of the Northern United States, Ontario, Quebec, and New Brunswick; and at various points along the way they all intersected with Underground Railroad stations where runaway slaves could take shelter and would be given food and clothing. Enslaved people used the Underground Railroad despite the Fugitive Slave Act of 1850, which stated that "any federal marshal who did not arrest on demand any person believed to be a runaway slave could be fined $1,000. As for the runaway slaves themselves, they would be arrested and stripped of any and all civil rights".

=== Migration to Ontario ===
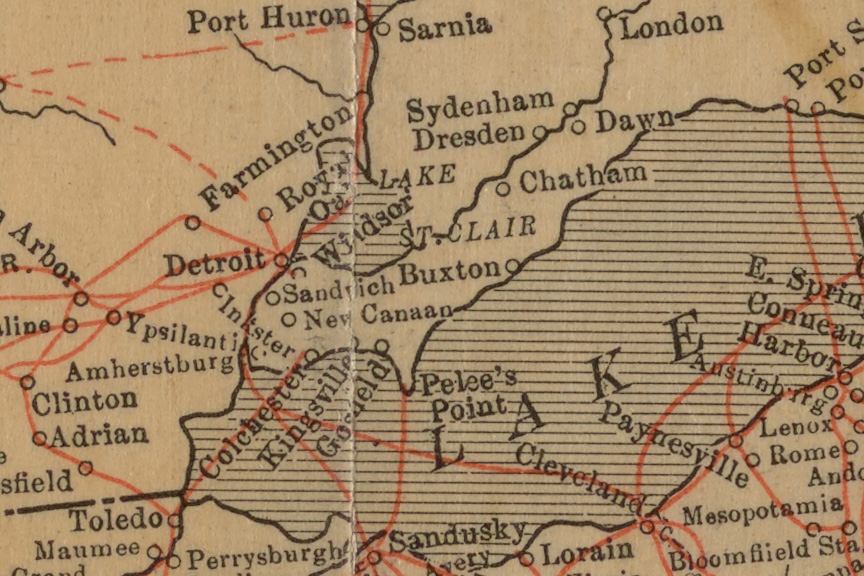
Underground Railroad routes to southwestern Ontario

In the mid-nineteenth century, black slaves were fleeing the United States by the thousands and coming north to Ontario, Quebec, and New Brunswick, via the Underground Railroad, the vast majority of these fugitive slaves arriving in Southwestern Ontario, crossing mainly over the Detroit River and to a lesser extent the Niagara River. After the Slavery Abolition Act 1833 of the British Empire, the number of refugees from slavery coming to the colonies grew, and local leaders in the region became concerned that the influx of refugees, estimated to be around 30,000 in 1852, made it more difficult for Blacks to find jobs in their new homeland. As early as 1846, meetings were held by local church leaders to help remedy the situation, and later that year, the Refugee Home Society was founded. The Refugee Home Society was dissolved in 1864, due to limiting land policies, lack of significant leadership. Families migrated to Haiti and various parts of Canada.

== John and Jane Walls ==
John Freeman Walls worked at the Walls's plantation on Troublesome Creek, in Rockingham County, North Carolina. It was here that he became good friends with Daniel Walls, the slave owner's son and his wife Jane King Walls. When Daniel was on his deathbed he freed John and placed Jane and their children under the care of John.

In 1845, John and Jane left a life of slavery and oppression and fled towards Detroit, Michigan in search of a new life. The Walls family crossed Lake Erie in a steam boat the Pearl and arrived in Amherstburg, Ontario, in 1846. The two were abolitionists who fought against the institution of slavery. Their inter-racial relationship (John being black and Jane being white) caused controversy after they arrived, and they often received stares, although according to John, most of the refugees were neither black nor white but "various shades of black." Upon their arrival, the two toured various settlements and decided to live in Puce settlement, where the Refugee Home Society had recently purchased land to sell back to refugee slaves. The two purchased a 12-acre (49,000 m^{2}) property and settle at 859 East Puce Road in Puce (now known as Emeryville). They built a log cabin and acquired more than 200 acres (0.81 km^{2}) of land. The Walls had six children at Puce. John was a carpenter.

John and Jane held the initial services of the Refugee Home Society in their own home. Jane was a Sunday School teacher while John was the Deacon of the First Baptist Church and loaned the congregation the funds to purchase the necessary land for the construction of a log cabin church. The couple had many Quaker friends who assisted in smuggling fugitives by dressing them up in women's costumes. One of the most well known was Levi Coffin, a Quaker from Cincinnati who became known as the President of The Underground Railroad for his valiant crusade against slavery. John had a favourite passage in the Bible, Proverbs III, "My son forget not my laws, but let thine heart keep my commandments for length of day and long life shall they bring thee". The Walls sent word of their new haven to a Quaker abolitionist couple in Indiana who had married them on their journey to Ontario and the site evolved into a terminal station for the Underground Railroad where they welcomed many fugitives of slavery and helped them to begin a free life in southwestern Ontario. Jane revisited to the south on two separate occasions and returned with numerous refugees of slavery.

== Historic site and museum ==
The site was first recognized by the government for its historical significance after one of Walls' descendants, their great-great grandson Dr. Bryan E. Walls, wrote a historical novel in 1976 called The Road that Led to Somewhere, a novel which chronicled the Walls' original journey to the settlement and their involvement in the Underground Railroad. The novel created interest in the Walls' story, and in 1985, the John Freeman Walls Historic Site and Underground Railroad Museum was opened. The current site now operates as a history museum. It contains Walls' original log cabin, the Walls' family cemetery, as well as the Historic Walkway, an overgrown brush trail that recreates the natural setting fleeing slaves would have had to contend with. The site also commemorates the modern Civil Rights Movement with a Peace Chapel created in honour of Rosa Parks, inside of which hangs a cross made from bricks from the Lorraine Motel in Memphis, Tennessee where Martin Luther King Jr. was assassinated.

A historical plaque exists on the site, which is still run by the family. It does not receive any government support. The site is administered as a non-profit organization by the Proverbs Heritage Organization, and shares a close relationship with the Motown Historical Museum in Detroit, Michigan. For his contribution to Black History, Bryan Walls has received the Order of Canada and the Order of Ontario.

== See also ==
- Black Canadians
- List of Underground Railroad sites
