= Iwatani =

Iwatani (written: 岩谷), is a Japanese surname. Notable people with the surname include:

- Mayu Iwatani (岩谷 麻由; born 1993), Japanese professional wrestler
- Tokiko Iwatani (岩谷 時子; 1916–2013), Japanese lyricist, poet and translator
- Toru Iwatani (岩谷 徹; born 1955), Japanese video game designer
- Toshio Iwatani (岩谷 俊夫; 1925–1970), Japanese footballer
