= New Canaan, Ontario =

New Canaan
- Town
- Interactive map of New Canaan
- Coordinates: 42.12°N 82.936°W
- Country: Canada
- Province: Ontario
- County: Essex
- Time zone: UTC-5 (Eastern (EST))
  - Summer (DST): UTC-4 (EDT)

New Canaan was a small settlement between Essex to the Southeast and McGregor to the Northwest on Malden Road (County Road 12) in Essex County, Ontario, today officially part of the town of Essex.

The current Town of Essex was created on 1 April 1999 by the amalgamation of the communities of Essex, Harrow, Colchester North, and Colchester South. Harrow comprises the communities of Ambassador Beach, Barretville, Belcreft Beach, Colchester, Edgars, Essex Centre, Gesto, Harrow Centre, Klie's Beach, Leslies Corner, Levergood Beach, Lypps Beach, Marshfield, McGregor, New Canaan, Oxley, Paquette Corners, Seymour Beach and Vereker.

New Canaan was initially settled in the 1820s by Afro-Americans who had escaped from slavery in the American South, many of them from Kentucky. When the freedom boundary shifted to the Canada–United States border with the enactment of the Fugitive Slave Act of 1850, additional families seeking refuge and coming along the Underground Railroad into Canada joined the original black settlers in New Canaan.

== Notable people ==
- Delos Rogest Davis, one of Canada's first Black lawyers and organizer of the former North Colchester Township.
