= Cryogenmash =

Company based in Balashikha, Russia

Kriogenmash
- Company type: Joint-stock company
- Founded: 1945
- Headquarters: Balashikha, Russia
- Parent: OMZ
- Website: www.cryogenmash.ru

Kriogenmash Scientific Production Association (Russian: НПО «Криогенмаш») is a company based in Balashikha, Russia. It was involved in the manufacturing of cryogenic fuel components in Soviet and Russian missiles, from the R-1 missile to the Sea Launch project.

== History ==
In 1939, Petr Leonidovich Kapitsa developed a method of liquefying large quantities of oxygen using a relatively simple technique. In 1943 he was involved in the creation of "Glavkislorod" (main oxygen), which subsequently evolved into the Kriogenmash Scientific Production Association.

Kriogenmash consists of a design bureau and collocated production facility at Balashikha in Moscow Oblast that specializes in the design and production of equipment for the production of cryogenic gases. The bulk of this equipment is delivered to metallurgical plants throughout the former Soviet Union.

Kriogenmash has supplied cryogenic equipment to the Buran space program and to the Russian aviation industry. The cryogenic equipment for the Tokamak-15 thermonuclear complex was designed and built by Kriogenmash. An experimental complex designed to supply gas to villages located far from mainline piping is one of the Association's current projects. Kitchen sinks, thermos flasks, tableware and automobile exhausts are also among the products of the association.
