= Henry Bibb =

American ex slave, writer, and abolitionist (1815–1854)

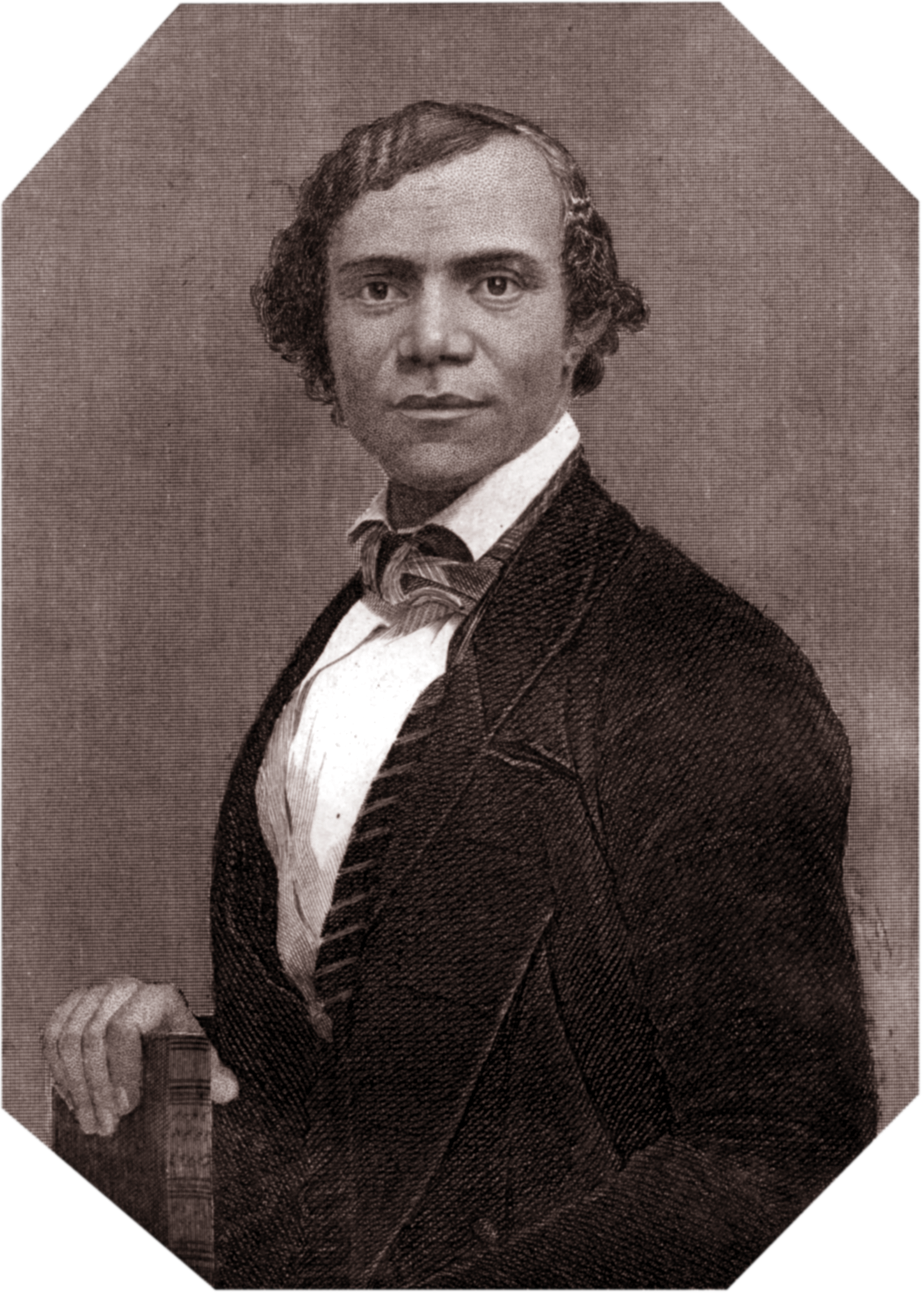
Henry Bibb, copper engraving by Patrick H. Reason

Henry Walton Bibb (May 10, 1815 – August 1, 1854) was an American author and abolitionist who was born into slavery. Bibb told his life story in his Narrative of the Life and Adventures of Henry Bibb, An American Slave, which included many failed escape attempts followed finally by success when he escaped to Detroit. After leaving Detroit to move to Canada with his family, due to issues with the legality of his assistance in the Underground Railroad, he founded the abolitionist newspaper Voice of the Fugitive. He lived in Canada until his death.

== Biography ==
Bibb was born on May 19, 1816, to an enslaved woman, Mildred Jackson, on a Shelby County, Kentucky, plantation. His father was Senator James Bibb, a relative of George M. Bibb, a Kentucky state senator. Williard Greenwood, a slaveholder, sold his six siblings away to different buyers. Bibb was hired out by his father for his wages. After wishing to learn to read the Bible he received some education at a school operated by Miss Davis, until the school was shut down by locals.

When Bibb was young, he felt the Ohio River was the thing that would keep him from freedom. He would often look across the river and wonder how it could be crossed, but he felt it was his barrier from freedom. He knew that if he passed it, he could be free in Canada, but the task of crossing it would be near impossible.

Bibb gave details of his first marriage in the autobiography Narrative of the Life and Adventures of Henry Bibb. Bibb met Malinda when he was 18. She lived in Oldham County, Kentucky, on a plantation not far from the plantation he resided at, at the time. Bibb quickly fell in love with her, but they were apprehensive on marriage, since they both dreamed of freedom. The two decided to wait a year, and if they still wished to marry by then, they would. In 1833 Henry and Malinda married, and soon after had a child whom they named Mary Frances. Bibb's frequent escape attempts kept him away from his family for long periods of time. At one point Bibb successfully escaped to Canada, but came back for his family and was recaptured. After Bibb escaped the final time he inquired to those he knew about Malinda. He found that she had been living in adultery, because she believed him to be dead.

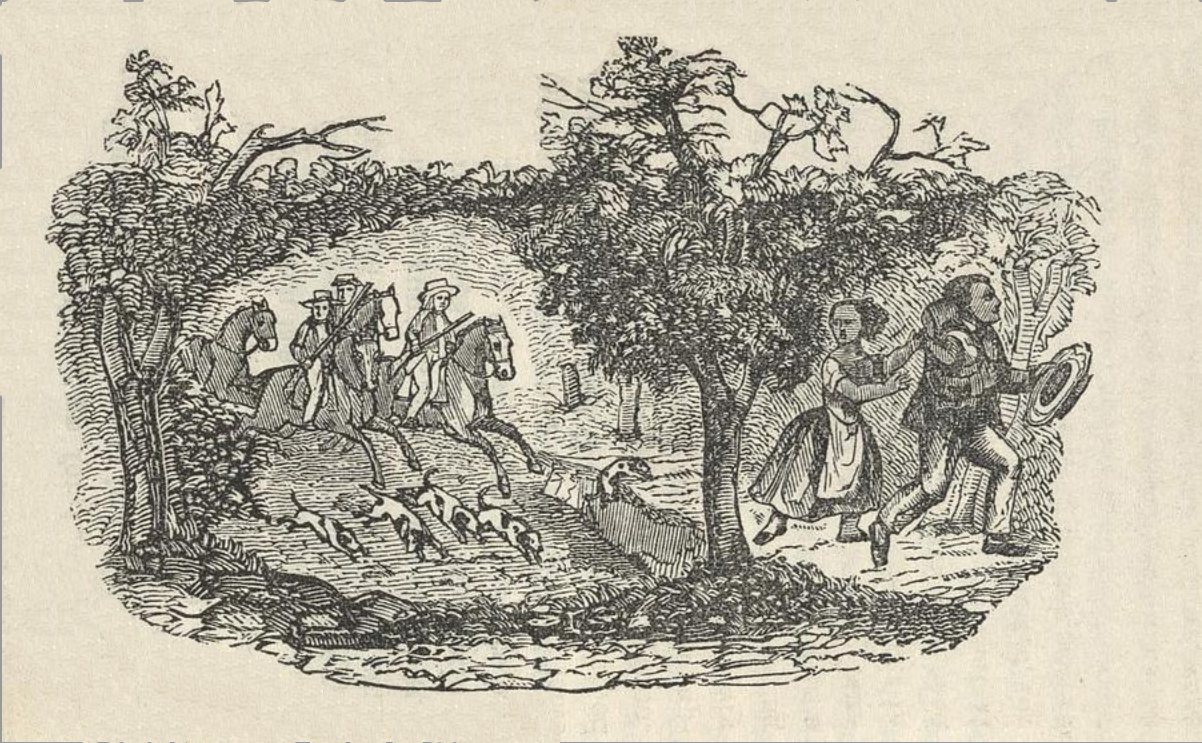
Illustration of slave catchers on horseback pursuing Henry and Malinda Bibb and their child, from the 1849 book Narrative of the Life and Adventures of Henry Bibb.

Around 1837, Bibb escaped slavery and fled to Cincinnati, Ohio. Six months later he returned to free his wife, but he was captured and enslaved again. Bibb and his daughter were sold to a slaveholder in Vicksburg, Ohio. After a failed attempt to escape, Bibb was sold to Cherokees on the Kansas-Oklahoma border.

Bibb's account of the Cherokee slaveholder who bought him was the most positive of all his accounts of slaveholders. Because of Bibb's positive experience with this Cherokee man, he left out his name from the narrative. This is the only owner whose name Bibb left out of the narrative, and he credits this to the treatment he received while in his care. Bibb also mentioned in his narrative that he believed the difference in Native American slaveholders was that they were producing crops for their own use, while southerners were producing crops to sell and make a profit.

In 1842, Bibb managed to flee to the Second Baptist Church in Detroit, an Underground Railroad station operated by Rev. William Charles Monroe. He hoped to gain his wife and daughter's freedom. After finding out that Malinda had been sold as a mistress to a white planter, Bibb focused on his career as an abolitionist. He was taught to read and write by Monroe.

Bibb traveled and lectured throughout the United States with Frederick Douglass and William Wells Brown. He supported the Underground Railroad. In 1846, he guided Lewis Richardson across the border and to Amherstburg, Canada. Bibb was a member of the Liberty Party. In May 1847 Bibb met his second wife Mary E. Miles; they married in June 1848. In 1849–50 he published his autobiography Narrative of the Life and Adventures of Henry Bibb, An American Slave, Written by Himself. In 1850, Bibb became the secretary for the American League of Colored Laborers, the first black labor union in the United States.

The passage of the Fugitive Slave Act of 1850 increased the danger to Bibb and his second wife, Mary E. Miles. The act made it illegal to help escaped slaves. To ensure their safety, the Bibbs migrated with his mother to Canada and settled in Sandwich, Upper Canada, now Windsor, Ontario. In 1851, he set up the first black newspaper in Canada, The Voice of the Fugitive. The paper helped develop a more sympathetic climate for black people in Canada and helped new arrivals to adjust.

Henry and Mary E. Bibb were huge supporters of Canadian emigration and together they managed the Refugee Home Society, which they helped found in 1851 with Josiah Henson. Mary established a school for children.

Due to his fame as an author, Bibb was reunited with three of his brothers, who separately had also escaped from slavery to Canada. In 1852, he published their accounts in his newspaper.

He died on August 1, 1854, at Windsor, Canada West (now Ontario), at the age of 39. His cause of death was listed as congestion of the brain. The abolishment of slavery in Canada was finalized on that date in 1833, and the date was (and is) considered a national holiday.

== Later life and legacy ==
Henry Bibb is mostly remembered for his life and many escape attempts which he documented in his narrative, but Henry Bibb's mission did not end after his successful escape. Bibb spent the remainder of his life after escape assisting in the Underground Railroad, and later publishing about the abolishment of slavery, while living in Canada. On the Underground Railroad Bibb mainly assisted on the route from Detroit to Canada, which crossed the Detroit river. Slaves would escape to Detroit, at which point they were safe and could either stay there, or cross the river to Detroit. Bibb worked tirelessly assisting this cause. Bibb assisted in establishing the Detroit River region as a safe haven and symbol of freedom for African American's escaping slavery on the Underground Railroad.

Even after Bibb moved to Canada to avoid prosecution for his assistance in the Underground Railroad, he still aided those escaping slavery through his publications.

Bibb's The Life and Adventures of Henry Bibb allowed for his story to remain known.

== Ruminations on slavery ==
=== Account on superstitions among slaves ===
In The Life and Adventures of Henry Bibb, Bibb provided an account on the superstitions which slaves (including himself, in his youth) partook in. Bibb believed, at the time which he wrote his narrative, that most of these slaves who practiced witchcraft were only pretending to know how to use it. He still acknowledged that the majority of the slaves believed in its merit.

Bibb told of two instances in his narrative, where he believed he had been tricked by conjurers, who he believed were only after money. One of these times he attempted to win the love of a woman, and the other time he tried his luck with another conjurer who suggested he follow his instructions in order to make a successful escape.

After these failed attempts with the witch doctors, Bibb seemed to no longer believe in the superstition. He acknowledged that belief in such superstitions came with the lack of education slaves were provided.

=== Concern of being accused of exaggeration ===
In the last chapter of Bibb's narrative he expresses the fear that he will be accused of exaggerating his story. He clarified that none of his stories were exaggerated, and slavery is not something that could be exaggerated, because it was the peak of dread.

== Agent on the Underground Railroad ==
During Bibb's time as an agent for the Underground Railroad he lived in Detroit. Even though he lived in Detroit, his work with the Underground Railroad had him traveling back and forth from Detroit to Canada via the Detroit River often. Bibb's role with the Underground Railroad included crossing the river with some escapees, and meeting others on the other side of the river, in Canada. The details of Bibb's assistance in the Underground Railroad are available thanks to letters he wrote, and that were written about him while he was an agent. Further information was written by Bibb in his publications.

=== Letter from Elder Binga in the April 24, 1846 edition of Anti-Slavery Bugle ===
The letter speaks of the successful escape of a man named Lewis Richardson, and details the following. Bibb led Richardson (a native of Kentucky) across the Detroit River, to Canada. After Richardson was safely in Canada, Bibb celebrated his escape, and sang him the Fugitive's Triumph.

=== Letter from Henry Bibb to John Calkins ===
A letter which Henry Bibb wrote in Windsor on June 19, 1850, to a man named John Calkins has been saved in his original handwriting, and is available to read online.

This letter is three pages in length, and details his financial assistance to slaves whom were fleeing to Canada via the Underground Railroad. The letter proves Bibb's aid in the Underground Railroad.

== Appendix of The Life and Adventures of Henry Bibb ==
The appendix functions as a bibliography. In the appendix, Bibb includes letters as well as excerpts from the Voice of the Fugitive.

=== Letter from Henry Bibb to James G. Birney, written February 25, 1845 ===
Bibb writes to James G. Birney, an abolitionist who accused Bibb of not being truthful in his narrative. Bibb explains, in short, that he was telling the truth in his narrative, and that he appreciated Birney's honest review of his work. He acknowledged that his imperfect recollection of dates led Birney and others to believe he was not being honest. He told his intention of proving his honesty.

=== Henry Bibb's letters to his old master ===
Henry Bibb wrote two letters to Albert G. Sibley. One letter was written on September 23, 1852, and when he did not receive a response he wrote another letter on October 7 of that same year.

In the first letter Bibb tells Sibley that he is not a real Christian. Bibb also informs Sibley that his siblings which escaped from Sibley's plantation are now free with him in Canada. Bibb continues the letter addressing all of the horrendous acts associated with enslaving people, which go against the word of God.

In the second letter, after Sibley neglected to respond to the first, Bibb continued to call to attention that in order for Sibley to be a real Christian, he had to stop slaveholding. Bibb countered the common slaveholder idea (that freed slaves could not care for themselves) with the fact that slaves cared for themselves, their masters, and the plantation they lived on. Bibb ends the letter by stating that if Sibley tries to contest that anything he said happened, he will provide validation. Bibb then left a note at the bottom of the letter, which let Sibley know that if he continued to ignore his letters he would continue to send more.

== Bibliography ==
- Narrative of the Life and Adventures of Henry Bibb, An American Slave, Written by Himself, Self-published, New York: 1849
- Karolyn Smardz Frost and Veta Smith Tucker, ed. A Fluid Frontier: Slavery, Resistance, and the Underground Railroad in the Detroit River Borderland (Detroit, MI: Wayne State University Press, 2016), 138–143.

== See also ==
- List of enslaved people
