= ElringKlinger =

German automotive supplier

ElringKlinger AG
- Type: Aktiengesellschaft
- Traded as: FWB: ZIL2
- Industry: Automotive, manufacturing
- Predecessor: Klinger
- Founded: 1879; 147 years ago in Stuttgart, Germany
- Founder: Paul Lechler
- Headquarters: Dettingen an der Erms, Germany
- Key people: Thomas Jessulat (CEO and chairman of the management board)
- Products: Auto parts including battery and fuel cell technology, lightweight components, head gaskets, modules and acoustic and thermal shielding systems for engines and exhausts
- Revenue: ▼€1.641 billion (2025)
- Net income: ▼ -€10.6 million (2025)
- Total equity: ▼€666.3 million (2025)
- Number of employees: 8,605 (2025)
- Website: www.elringklinger.de/en

ElringKlinger AG is a German automotive supplier and car spare parts manufacturer headquartered in Dettingen an der Erms, Germany. As a worldwide development partner and original equipment supplier of battery and fuel cell technology, sealing systems, lightweight components and modules, shielding systems, as well as components made of high-performance plastics. ElringKlinger provides its products to almost all of the world's vehicle and engine manufacturers.

Today, ElringKlinger employs roughly 8,600 people in 40 locations worldwide.

== History ==
In 1879, Paul Lechler founded a company trading in gaskets and technical products in Stuttgart. The company began manufacturing its own gaskets in 1914. Its headquarters were moved to Dettingen an der Erms between 1964 and 1965. Back in 1885, Richard Klinger had established an engineering workshop in Vienna, which also started producing cylinder-head gaskets in 1930.

The company's international expansion began in 1971 with the acquisition of its first ownership interest in Spain. Its manufacturing sites in Bietigheim-Bissingen and Langenzenn were set up in the following year.

In 1994, the automotive divisions of Richard Klinger GmbH and Elring GmbH joined forces to form ElringKlinger GmbH, with its headquarters in Dettingen. On October 30, 2000, ElringKlinger GmbH merged with the parent company ZWL Grundbesitz- und Beteiligungs-AG and took the new name ElringKlinger AG. ElringKlinger AG has been listed on the Frankfurt and Stuttgart stock exchanges since January 21, 2002. The company was accepted into the SDAX on November 13, 2003, and the MDAX on March 4, 2009. At its meeting of March 3, 2016, Deutsche Börse agreed changes to the composition of its equity indices, which returned ElringKlinger AG stock to the SDAX with effect from March 21, 2016.

Effective from October 27, 2009, ElringKlinger acquired the automotive supplier Ompaş, based in the Turkish city of Bursa, to gain a foothold in the Turkish market.

This was followed by the purchase of Hug Group, a Swiss exhaust specialist, on May 11, 2011. Hug was sold to Faurecia in 2018.

Effective from September 12, 2011, ElringKlinger AG acquired 90 percent of the Lenningen-based mold- and toolmaker Hummel-Formen.

The Japanese joint venture ElringKlinger Marusan Corporation and its subsidiaries were fully consolidated as of December 31, 2013, based on a contractual agreement on the exercise of control.

ElringKlinger Kunststofftechnik GmbH acquired all interests in Polytetra GmbH, a processor of fluoropolymers and conventional high-performance plastics, in October 2014.

In February 2015, ElringKlinger acquired the U.S. automotive supplier M&W Manufacturing Co., Michigan, significantly strengthening its market position for control plates for automatic transmissions in North America and worldwide.

The company entered into a strategic partnership with engineering specialist hofer AG in October 2016, also taking a 53 percent interest in the subsidiary hofer powertrain products GmbH. Acquiring this stake enabled ElringKlinger to benefit from the powertrain system developer's innovative strength for developing and manufacturing alternative drive technologies for hybrid or all-electric vehicles.

In March 2021, the company announced a major contract for the supply of battery components for a global battery manufacturer's German plant, scheduled to commence in 2022 and lasting nine years.

The joint venture EKPO Fuel Cell Technologies GmbH, Dettingen/Erms, Germany, was launched in March 2021 for the development and mass production of fuel cell stacks for CO2-neutral mobility.

In June 2024 a battery hub for the American market was founded: ElringKlinger South Carolina, LLC., Easley.

== Management board ==
The board consists of three members:

- https://elringklinger.de/en/company/management/management-board Thomas Jessulat, Isabelle Damen, Dirk Willers

== Product areas ==
ElringKlinger is engaging in the following product areas:

- Sealing systems
- Lightweight components and modules
- Shielding technology
- E-Mobility (battery and fuel cell technology)
- Components for electric drive units
- Components for electrolyzers
- Aftermarket
- Engineered Plastics
- Spare parts
- Tooling technology

== Structure of the ElringKlinger Group ==
=== National (Germany) ===
- 100% Gedächtnisstiftung Karl Müller Belegschaftshilfe GmbH
- 100% ElringKlinger Logistic Service GmbH
- 77,5 % ElringKlinger Kunststofftechnik GmbH
- 100% KOCHWERK Catering GmbH
- 24.71% hofer AG
- 100% hofer powertrain products GmbH / DE
- 60% EKPO Fuel Cell Technologies GmbH

=== International ===
- 100% Elring Klinger (Great Britain) Ltd. / UK
- 100% Elring Parts Ltd. / UK
- 100% ElringKlinger Italia Srl / IT
- 100% ElringKlinger Meillor SAS / FR
- 100% HURO Supermold S. R. L. / RO
- 100% ElringKlinger Hungary Kft. / HU
- 100% Elring Klinger, S.A.U. / ES
- 100% ElringKlinger TR Otomotiv Şanayi ve Ticaret A.Ş. / TR
- 100% ElringKlinger Canada, Inc. / CA
- 100% ElringKlinger Manufacturing Indiana, Inc. / US
- 100% ElringKlinger Automotive Manufacturing, Inc. / US
- 100% ElringKlinger Silicon Valley, Inc. / US
- 100% ElringKlinger Holding USA, Inc. / US
- 100% Elring Klinger México, S.A. de C.V. / MX
- 100% EKASER, S.A. de C.V. / MX
- 100% Elring Klinger do Brasil Ltda. / BR
- 100% Elring Klinger South Africa (Pty) Ltd. / ZA
- 100% ElringKlinger Automotive Components (India) Pvt. Ltd. / IN
- 100% ElringKlinger China, Ltd. / CN
- 88% Changchun ElringKlinger Ltd. / CN
- 100% ElringKlinger Chongqing Ltd. / CN
- 77.5% ElringKlinger Engineered Plastics (Qingdao) Commercial Co. / CN (subsidiary of ElringKlinger Kunststofftechnik)
- 77.5% ElringKlinger Engineered Plastics North America, Inc. / US (subsidiary of ElringKlinger Kunststofftechnik)
- 100% ElringKlinger Korea / KR
- 50% ElringKlinger Marusan Corporation / JP
- 26.05 % Marusan Kogyo Co., Ltd. / JP
- 50% PT. ElringKlinger Indonesia / ID (subsidiary of ElringKlinger Marusan Corporation / JP)
- 50% ElringKlinger (Thailand) Co., Ltd. / TH (subsidiary of ElringKlinger Marusan Corporation / JP)
