= Old Sandwich Town =

Historic settlement in Ontario, Canada

Coordinates: 42.299°N 83.076°W

Sandwich Town (Olde Sandwich Towne) is located along the Canada–US border of the Detroit River, and was established in 1797. It is considered one of the oldest, most historically significant settlements in Ontario and has been the site of several historically significant events in Ontario's history. Many historic buildings remain in Old Sandwich Town and the area hosts an annual festival to celebrate its heritage. The area is now a neighbourhood of the city of Windsor.

== History ==
This area south of what was named the Detroit River was initially inhabited by various First Nations, including the Ojibwa, Ottawa (known as Odawa), Potawatomi, all of which were Algonquin-speaking, and Wyandot peoples, also known as the Huron to the French. The Huron were an Iroquoian-speaking tribe. In 1747, the first Jesuit mission in Upper Canada was established in this area. A French colonial farming settlement formed near the mission and became known as Petite Côte, for being located near a bend in the Detroit River which shortened some of the riverfront frontage for the farm plots that extended into the interior. The area was located south of Turkey Creek along the east bank of the Detroit River and later as LaSalle.

After Detroit became independent from Great Britain in 1796, resulting from the United States success in the western theatre of the American Revolutionary War, the Crown encouraged development at Sandwich on the opposite side of the river. Most Loyalists from Detroit moved south of the Detroit River, to the Sandwich area. By 1797, Britain purchased this land "…from the Huron Indians for about 300 pounds' worth of supplies…". In 1858, Sandwich was properly acknowledged with "town" status. In 1935, Old Sandwich Town was amalgamated with East Windsor, Windsor, and Walkerville to formulate the city of Windsor, Ontario.

Sandwich has been the site of significant historic events, such as the beginning of the War of 1812 between Britain and the US, in part fought over the northern border with Canada. This brought various influential military figures to Old Sandwich Town, such as; Chief Tecumseh, British Major Generals Sir Isaac Brock and Henry Procter, and American General William Henry Harrison, who later became the ninth president of the United States. Sandwich also saw action during the Upper Canada Rebellion in 1837-1838; which revealed Sandwich and Windsor to be likely targets for rebellion, and invasion by a Fenian movement from the United States. The Battle of Windsor commenced during December 1838, which confirmed suspicions of American invasion. Hundreds of "Patriots" stormed the Canadian frontier of the Detroit River, until they were thwarted by militia in Sandwich.

== Historic buildings, monuments and notable residents ==
Augustus Adams in his front yard, Sandwich, Ontario, 1906

Old Sandwich Town is home to some of Ontario's oldest and most historically important buildings, such as Mackenzie Hall, built by Alexander Mackenzie, a local stone-mason and builder who went on to be Canada's second Prime Minister, and the Duff Baby House, considered to be the oldest-surviving structure in all of Ontario. Some important Canadian figures have lived here, including Mackenzie and Henry Bibb, a fugitive slave who founded the first Afro-Canadian newspaper. In the antebellum years of the United States, Sandwich and the surrounding area became a destination and established black settlement for thousands of freed and fugitive slaves taking refuge from slavery in the United States.

A life-size bronze statue of a dismounted Brock alongside a mounted Tecumseh, created by Canadian sculptor Mark Williams, was unveiled in Sandwich Towne, on September 7, 2018. The sculpture commemorates the partnership between the two leaders which resulted in the capture of Detroit. Scott Finlay was the model for Brock while David Morris was the model for Tecumseh; both frequently portrayed the two leaders during War of 1812 commemorative events in Ontario. Brock is shown examining Detroit through his telescope while Tecumseh watches a British artillery battery on the Canadian shore bombard the fort.

The community has published a walking guide so that visitors can explore the history and heritage of the former town of Sandwich.

== See also ==
- List of Jesuit sites
- Neighbourhoods of Windsor, Ontario Sandwich
- Sandwich Town BIA
