= Sidney LeRoi Clunis =

Canadian politician

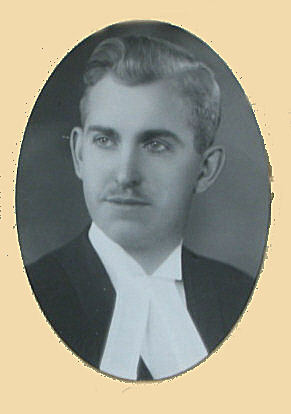
- Graduation photo from Osgoode Law School

Member of Parliament for Kent
- In office September 1962 – April 1963
- Preceded by: Harold Danforth
- Succeeded by: Harold Danforth

Personal details
- Born: 22 April 1911 Blenheim, Ontario, Canada
- Died: 7 November 1975 (aged 64) Kingsville, Ontario, Canada
- Party: Liberal
- Spouse(s): Marjorie W. Merilees m. 8 August 1937
- Profession: Lawyer

Sidney LeRoi Clunis (22 April 1911 – 7 November 1975) was a Liberal party member of the House of Commons of Canada. Born in Blenheim, Ontario, he was a lawyer by career.

He attended public and secondary schools in Blenheim, then Ontario Agricultural College and the University of Western Ontario and Osgoode Hall Law School. He attained a Bachelor of Arts degree.

He was first elected at the Kent riding in the 1962 general election, defeating incumbent Harold Danforth of the Progressive Conservative party. After serving one term, the 25th Parliament, he was defeated by Danforth in the 1963 election.
