= Progressive Conservative Party of Canada candidates in the 1993 Canadian federal election =

The governing Progressive Conservative Party of Canada ran a full slate of 295 candidates in the 1993 federal election, and lost official party status in the House of Commons of Canada by winning only two seats. Many of the party's candidates have their own biography pages; information about others may be found here.

The page also includes information about Progressive Conservative candidates in federal by-elections held between 1993 and 1997.

== Quebec ==
=== Laval Centre: Bruno Fortier ===
Bruno Fortier has been an administrator, lawyer, and urban planner. He was for many years a close friend of prominent Canadian politician Jean Charest, whom he first met in high school. When Charest ran for the Progressive Conservative Party leadership in 1993, Fortier became the leadership campaign's organizer in Laval. In 2015, the Québec Court of Appeal condemned the Province to pay $75 000 in damages to Bruno Fortier including the highest amount of punitive damages since the Roncarelli c. Duplessis case in 1959 by the Supreme Court.

Fortier received 4,548 votes (7.98%) in the 1993 election for a third-place finish against Bloc Québécois candidate Madeleine Dalphond-Guiral. He later worked for the "non" side in the 1995 Quebec referendum on sovereignty, and he assisted the Quebec Liberal Party under Charest's leadership in the 2003 Quebec provincial election.

Charest's provincial Liberals won the 2003 election, and Fortier was subsequently appointed as director of economic development at Quebec Government House of New York City. In June 2007, he was promoted to delegate-general. In March 2008, however, he was dismissed from his office. Some reports in the Quebec media suggested that he had created a chaotic work environment. Quebec cabinet minister Monique Gagnon-Tremblay said that Fortier lacked the necessary judgement for the role and "undertook modifications, transformations at the delegation without ... approval." Fortier responded that the firing was "unjustly severe" and that it had been based on a complaint from a disgruntled employee. The Quebec government held public hearings on the matter in 2008, in which Charest testified that he was not involved in either Fortier's hiring or his dismissal.

In 2010, Fortier filed a statement of claim in the Quebec Superior Court seeking $1.2 million in damages from the Quebec government over his dismissal. The Court for Appeal case of 2015 issued on September 11 th was unanimous to condemn the Province . Premier Charest is subject of a police inquiry since 2012 according to the Journal de Montréal of April 24 th 2017, << Jean Charest et Marc Bibeau surveilles de pres par la police.>> : reportage de Jean Louis Fortin et Felix Seguin dans le Journal de Montreal du 24 avril 2017

=== Richelieu: Lorraine Frappier ===
Lorraine Frappier was president of the Sorel-Tracy Chamber of Commerce in 1985-86 and listed herself as a director-general in 1993. She received 4,455 votes (9.39%), finishing third against Bloc Québécois incumbent Louis Plamondon.

== Ontario ==
=== Eglinton—Lawrence: Marc Monson ===
Monson was listed as a Toronto realtor, and was the nephew of prominent rabbi David Monson. He campaigned on a platform of lower taxes and greater economic investment. He received 4,262 votes (10.66%), finishing third against Liberal incumbent Joseph Volpe. Following the Progressive Conservative Party's defeat in the election, Monson described the national PC campaign as "a big blue machine that didn't know how to change".

=== Essex—Kent: Kevin Charles Flood ===
Flood was born in Essex County, and resided in Kingsville. He was thirty-five years old during the 1993 campaign, and was manager of Grainco Grain Argi-Industries in Maidstone. He supported the amalgamation of Essex—Kent with the neighbouring Kent riding, arguing that Canadians were overgoverned and were represented by too many politicians. He also said that he would reject a government pension, and defended Progressive Conservative policies such as free trade. Flood described himself as a "non-politician".

His mother, Joan Flood, has served as mayor of Essex, and was also a Progressive Conservative candidate.

Flood campaigned for a seat on the Windsor City Council in 2000, and was defeated. Three years later, newspaper reports indicated that he was willing to let an American company use his ash tree property as a testing site for a pesticide called Perma-Guard D-20.

Electoral record
Election	Division	Party	Votes	%	Place	Winner
1993 federal	Essex—Kent	Progressive Conservative	4,751		3/5	Jerry Pickard, Liberal
2000 Windsor municipal	Council, Ward Two	n/a	373	2.46	7/9	Brian Masse and Peter Carlesimo

=== Nickel Belt: Ian Munro ===
Ian Munro was a 23-year-old Political Science student, and a native of Scarborough. He received 2,395 votes (5.43%), finishing fourth against Liberal candidate Ray Bonin.

=== Ottawa—Vanier: Marie-Christine Lemire ===
Lemire was born in Quebec, and holds a Bachelor of Social Sciences degree with Honours in Political Science and a concentration in Sociology from the University of Ottawa (Ottawa Citizen, 7 October 1993). She worked for various cabinet ministers during the Brian Mulroney government, including Marcel Masse (Canada NewsWire, 11 June 1988). She was thirty-seven years old during the 1993 campaign.

Lemire received 5,116 votes (10.53%), finishing second against Liberal Party incumbent Jean-Robert Gauthier. She later served on the federal Social Benefits Tribunal from 1999 to 2005.

=== Parkdale—High Park: Don Baker ===
Baker was 49 years old at the time of the election. His father created the Family Communications company in 1949, and Baker eventually became its president. During the 1990s, the company published the magazines Today's Bride, Best Wishes (given away free at maternity wards), Baby Name, Canadian Home Planner, and the New Baby and Child Care Encyclopedia.

He received 5,668 votes (13.78%), finishing third against Liberal candidate Jesse Flis. After the election, he noted that "Parkdale-High Park reacted like the rest of the country and said it's time for big change" (Toronto Star, 26 October 1993).

In 1998, Baker expanded his company's activities to organize a North American tour for Virsky, the Ukrainian National Dance Company (Toronto Star, 25 April 1998).

=== Parry Sound-Muskoka: Terry Clarke ===
Terry Clarke was raised in Port Sydney. He was a councillor in Huntsville in the 1980s and was elected mayor of that community in 1985. In 1987, he worked with the provincial government to secure funding for repairs to the municipal locks. Clarke supported the principle of a retreat for AIDS patients and caregivers in 1990, although he also noted that it would hurt the area's tourism in the short term due to prejudice against AIDS victims.

Clarke was a high-school principal in 1993. He defeated five other candidates to win the Progressive Conservative nomination. On election day, he received 9,529 votes (20.63%) for a third-place finish against Liberal candidate Andy Mitchell.

== Manitoba ==
=== Kelly Clark (Provencher) ===
Kelly Clark was a development officer. Clark won the Progressive Conservative nomination for Provencher in a close contest against two strong candidates, prevailing by 21 votes on the final ballot. In the general election, Clark received 3,765 votes (10.29%) for a third-place finish against Liberal candidate David Iftody.

=== Brett Eckstein (Winnipeg—Transcona) ===
Brett Carter Eckstein has a Bachelor of Arts degree in Politics and Economics and a Master of Arts degree in International Relations and Canadian Government from the University of Manitoba, as well as a Master of Science degree in Space Studies from the University of North Dakota. He worked as an aerospace consultant in 1993. He received 2,112 votes (5.11%), finishing fourth against New Democratic Party incumbent Bill Blaikie.

Eckstein later became a provincial civil servant, and served as Senior Policy Analyst for Manitoba Executive Council's Sustainable Development Co-ordination Unit and Senior Analyst for the Policy Management Secretariat. He joined the Pollution Prevention Branch of Manitoba Conservation in 2000, and was listed in 2002 as a policy analyst, responsible for the development and implementation of "Manitoba's Sustainable Development Procurement Guidelines". In 2006, he oversaw Energy Climate Change & Green Strategy Initiatives for the Science, Technology, Energy and Mines. As of 2008, Brett Eckstein currently works as the Chief Executive Officer of Tire Stewardship Manitoba . 2019 listed as chair, Canadian Association of Tire Recycling Agencies (CATRA).

== Candidates in subsequent by-elections ==
=== Brome—Missisquoi: Guy Lever ===
Guy Lever was a thirty-five-year-old real estate developer living in Knowlton at the time of the election. A relative political unknown, he was joined on several campaign stops by party leader Jean Charest, who represented the neighbouring riding of Sherbrooke. He was also supported by Robert Benoit, the Liberal member of the Quebec National Assembly from Orford. (The Quebec Liberal Party is distinct from the Liberal Party of Canada; many of the provincial party's members were aligned with the federal Progressive Conservatives in this period.) He received 1,235 votes (3.30%), finishing third against Liberal Party candidate Denis Paradis.
