= Archibald Campbell (Canadian politician) =

Canadian politician (1845–1913)

The Hon. Archibald Campbell
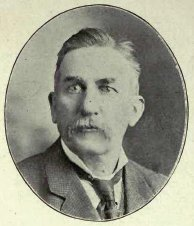

Member of Parliament for Kent
- In office 1887–1900
- Preceded by: Henry Smyth
- Succeeded by: George Stephens

Member of Parliament for York West
- In office 1902–1904
- Preceded by: Nathaniel Clarke Wallace
- Succeeded by: The electoral district was abolished in 1903.

Member of Parliament for York Centre
- In office 1904–1907
- Preceded by: The electoral district was created in 1903.
- Succeeded by: Peter Douglas McLean

Canadian Senator from Ontario
- In office November 22, 1907 – January 15, 1913
- Appointed by: Wilfrid Laurier

Personal details
- Born: April 27, 1845 Howard Township, Kent County, Canada West
- Died: January 15, 1913 (aged 67)
- Party: Liberal

Archibald Campbell (April 27, 1845 – January 5, 1913) was a Canadian politician.

== Background ==
Born in Howard Township, Kent County, Canada West. His father was from Argyleshire, Scotland, and his mother a native of Oneida County, New York. Campbell was educated at the Public and High Schools of Kent. A miller, he was for several years member of the Council of Chatham which he represented in the County Council.

He was first elected to the House of Commons of Canada for the electoral district of Kent in the 1887 general elections. A Liberal, he was unseated but re-elected in a May 1888 by-election and elected again in the general elections of 1891 and 1896.

Shortly thereafter he relocated to Toronto Junction, where he owned a milling company. As one of the town's major employers, Campbell was instrumental in getting the town a customs house so that local businesses (including his own) could clear their railway imports without having to go to downtown Toronto. Despite this credential, he was an unsuccessful candidate in the electoral district of York West in the general elections of 1900, but he was elected in a 1902 by-election upon the death of Nathaniel Clarke Wallace. He was elected in 1904 for York Centre.

In 1907, he was called to the Senate of Canada representing the senatorial division of Toronto West, Ontario on the advice of Wilfrid Laurier. He served until his death in 1913.
