= Blake Huffman =

Canadian politician

Member of Parliament for Kent
- In office June 1949 – March 1958
- Preceded by: Clayton Earl Desmond
- Succeeded by: Harold Danforth

Personal details
- Born: Edward Blake Huffman; 29 April 1902 Blenheim, Ontario, Canada
- Died: 14 July 1985 (aged 83) Blenheim, Ontario, Canada
- Party: Liberal
- Spouse(s): Helen Wilkie m. 26 September 1925
- Profession: farmer

Edward Blake Huffman known as Blake Huffman (29 April 1902 – 14 July 1985) was a Canadian farmer and politician. Huffman served as a member of the House of Commons of Canada representing the Liberal party. Born in Blenheim, Ontario, he pursued a career as a farmer.

Huffman was first elected at the Kent riding in the 1949 general election. He was re-elected there for successive terms in 1953 and 1957, then defeated in the 1958 election by Harold Danforth of the Progressive Conservative Party.
