= Jerry Pickard =

Canadian politician (1940–2021)

The Honourable Jerry Pickard PC

Member of Parliament for Chatham-Kent—Essex
- In office November 27, 2000 – January 23, 2006
- Preceded by: Riding established
- Succeeded by: Dave Van Kesteren

Member of Parliament for Kent—Essex
- In office November 21, 1988 – November 27, 2000
- Preceded by: James Eber Caldwell
- Succeeded by: Riding abolished

Personal details
- Born: November 14, 1940 Chatham, Ontario, Canada
- Died: July 27, 2021 (aged 80) Chatham, Ontario, Canada
- Party: Liberal
- Spouse: Caroline Foëx (m. 1963)
- Profession: Teacher

Reginald "Jerry" Pickard PC (November 14, 1940 – July 27, 2021) was a Canadian politician who served as a member of the House of Commons of Canada from 1988 until his retirement in 2005, representing the riding of Chatham-Kent—Essex for the Liberal Party in his later terms in office.

== Biography ==
Pickard had Bachelor of Arts and Master of Education degrees from the University of Windsor, and worked as a teacher in the Kent County and Essex County boards of education following his graduation. He was elected to the Kingsville municipal council in 1974 and remained in municipal politics for the next fourteen years, including tenures as deputy reeve and mayor (1984–1988).

He was first elected to parliament in the federal election of 1988, defeating Progressive Conservative incumbent Jim Caldwell by about 6,500 votes in the riding of Essex—Kent. He was re-elected in the 1993 election, and in the redistributed riding of Kent—Essex in the 1997 election. Pickard's riding was renamed (but not redistributed) as Chatham-Kent—Essex in 1998. In the 2000 election, he defeated a candidate of the Canadian Alliance by over 7,000 votes.

He faced his first difficult re-election in 2004, defeating Conservative candidate Dave Van Kesteren by only 407 votes. Former Liberal MP Rex Crawford campaigned for the Conservative candidate in this election, and some local residents were upset that the federal government had cut down more than 80,000 ash trees to stop a devastating beetle infestation.

Pickard served as Parliamentary Secretary to the Minister of Agriculture and Agri-Food from 1996 to 1997, and to the Minister of Public Works and Government Services from 1997 to 1998. In December 2003, he was named Parliamentary Secretary to the Deputy Prime Minister and Minister of Public Safety and Emergency Preparedness, with special emphasis on border transit. He was transferred from this position in July 2004, and named Parliamentary Secretary to the Minister of Industry. Pickard did not run in the January 2006 election.

== Death ==
Pickard died on July 27, 2021, aged 80.

== Electoral record ==
1997 Canadian federal election: Kent—Essex
Party	Candidate	Votes	%	Expenditures
Liberal	Jerry Pickard	21,451	50.20	$48,652
Reform	Don R. Clarke	8,941	20.92	$32,040
Progressive Conservative	Jim Hawryluk	6,634	15.53	$28,040
New Democratic	Derry McKeever	4,323	10.12	$22,590
Christian Heritage	Roger James	621	1.45	$1,951
Canadian Action	Victor Knight	470	1.10	$1,515
Green	Greg Zolad	291	0.68	$141
Total valid votes		42,731	100.00	
Total rejected ballots		300		
Turnout		43,031	59.25	
Electors on the lists		72,624		
Sources: Official Results, Elections Canada and Financial Returns, Elections Canada.
