= Rex Crawford =

Canadian politician (1932–2022)

Member of the Canadian Parliament for Kent
- In office 1988–1997
- Preceded by: Elliott Hardey

Personal details
- Born: 25 February 1932 Detroit, Michigan, U.S.
- Died: 20 July 2022 (aged 90) Wallaceburg, Ontario, Canada
- Party: Liberal Party of Canada
- Spouse: Ruth Anne Deacon (m. 1954)
- Children: 4
- Profession: Farmer

Rex Crawford (25 February 1932 – 20 July 2022) was a Canadian politician who was a member of the House of Commons from 1988 to 1997. By career, he was a farmer.

Born in Detroit, Michigan, he first campaigned for a seat in Canadian Parliament during the 1988 federal election, as a candidate for the Liberal Party at the Kent electoral district. He won that election and was re-elected there in the 1993 federal election, therefore serving in the 34th and 35th Canadian Parliaments. He left Canadian politics in 1997 since he did not seek a third term in Parliament.

During his federal political career, Crawford would sometimes take views at variance with his fellow Liberals. In 2004, several years after he left Parliament, he supported Conservative party candidate Dave Van Kesteren in the Chatham-Kent—Essex riding during the 2004 federal election.

Crawford died on 20 July 2022, at the age of 90.

== Electoral record ==
1993 Canadian federal election: Kent
Party	Candidate	Votes	%	±%	Expenditures
Liberal	Rex Crawford	23,177	63.78	–	$26,452
Reform	Arnold Broeders	5,618	15.46		$23,617
Progressive Conservative	Tom Suitor	5,015	13.80		$25,419
New Democratic	Aaron De Meester	1,368	3.76		$10,887
National	Victor Knight	1,014	2.79		$8,536
Natural Law	Marty Howe	146	0.40		$0
Total valid votes		36,338	100.00		
Total rejected ballots		250			
Turnout		36,588	62.63		
Electors on the lists		58,415			
Source: Thirty-fifth General Election, 1993: Official Voting Results, Published by the Chief Electoral Officer of Canada. Financial figures taken from official contributions and expenses provided by Elections Canada.
