= Donald Baker =

Donald Baker or Don Baker may refer to:

- Don Baker (musician) (born 1950), Irish musician and actor
- Don Baker (The Atheist Experience), atheist activist and co-host of The Atheist Experience
- Don Baker, Canadian politician, Progressive-Conservative candidate in 1993
- Donald Baker, plaintiff in the U.S. court case Baker v. Wade
- Donald Baker (bishop) (1882–1968), Anglican bishop of Bendigo, Australia
