= McCoig =

McCoig is a surname. Notable people with the surname include:

- Archibald McCoig (1873–1927), Canadian politician
- Robert S. McCoig (1937–1998), Scottish badminton player
