= Kent West (federal electoral district) =

Former federal electoral district in Ontario, Canada

Ontario electoral district

Defunct federal electoral district
- Legislature: House of Commons
- District created: 1903
- District abolished: 1914
- First contested: 1904
- Last contested: 1911

Demographics
- Census division: Kent County
- Census subdivision(s): Blenheim, Chatham, Dover, Harwich, Raleigh, Romney, Tilbury, Tilbury East

Kent West was a federal electoral district (or riding) represented in the House of Commons of Canada from 1904 to 1917. It was located in the province of Ontario. This riding was created in 1903 when Kent riding was divided into two ridings, Kent West and Kent East.

The west riding consisted of the townships of Dover East, Dover West, Harwich, Raleigh, Romney and Tilbury East, the city of Chatham, the town of Blenheim, and the part of the village of Tilbury lying in the county of Kent.

The electoral district was abolished in 1914 when it was merged back into Kent riding.

== Members of Parliament ==
This riding has elected the following members of Parliament:

Parliament	Years	Member	Party
Riding created from Kent
10th	1904–1908	Herbert Sylvester Clements	Conservative
11th	1908–1911	Archibald McCoig	Liberal
12th	1911–1917	Archibald McCoig	Liberal
Riding dissolved into Kent

== Election results ==
1904 Canadian federal election
Party	Candidate	Votes
Conservative	Herbert S. Clements	3,652
Liberal	George Stephens	3,531

1908 Canadian federal election
Party	Candidate	Votes
Liberal	Archibald Blake McCoig	3,782
Conservative	Herbert Sylvester Clements	3,700

1911 Canadian federal election
Party	Candidate	Votes
Liberal	Archibald Blake McCoig	3,671
Conservative	Ward Stanworth	3,605

== See also ==
- List of Canadian electoral districts
- Historical federal electoral districts of Canada
