= Herbert Sylvester Clements =

Canadian politician

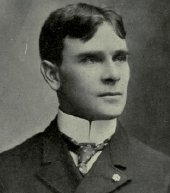

Member of the Canadian Parliament for Kent West
- In office 1904–1908
- Preceded by: The electoral district was created in 1903.
- Succeeded by: Archibald McCoig

Member of the Canadian Parliament for Comox—Atlin
- In office 1911–1917
- Preceded by: William Templeman
- Succeeded by: The electoral district was abolished in 1914.

Member of the Canadian Parliament for Comox—Alberni
- In office 1917–1921
- Preceded by: The electoral district was created in 1914.
- Succeeded by: Alan Webster Neill

Personal details
- Born: November 8, 1865 Dover Township, Canada West
- Died: November 30, 1939 (aged 74)
- Party: Conservative

Herbert Sylvester Clements (November 8, 1865 – November 30, 1939) was a Canadian politician.

Born in Dover Township, Canada West, a manufacturer and farmer, he was first elected to the House of Commons of Canada in the 1904 federal election for the Ontario electoral district of Kent West. A Conservative, he was defeated in 1908. He was elected in the 1911 elections for the British Columbia riding of Comox—Atlin. He was re-elected in 1917 to the redistributed seat, then named Comox-Alberni, where he was defeated in 1921.

== Legacy ==
The Village of Port Clements, British Columbia, in the Queen Charlotte Islands, is named for him (the islands were part of Comox-Atlin).
