= Robert Daudlin =

Canadian politician (born 1940)

Robert Mose Patrick Daudlin (born 3 March 1940) is a Canadian lawyer who was a Liberal party member of the House of Commons of Canada.

Born in Port Crewe, Ontario, He won the Kent—Essex electoral district in the 1974 federal election and was re-elected in the 1979 and 1980 federal elections. He did not campaign in the 1984 election, thus he left office after serving in the 30th, 31st and 32nd Canadian Parliaments.

He was appointed a judge of the Ontario Court of Justice in 1990.

Parliament of Canada
Preceded by Harold Warren Danforth	Member of Parliament for Kent—Essex; 1974–1979	Succeeded by The electoral district was abolished in 1976.
Preceded by The electoral district was created in 1976.	Member of Parliament for Essex—Kent; 1979–1984	Succeeded by Jim Caldwell
