= James Murdock (politician) =

Canadian politician

The Honourable James Murdock PC
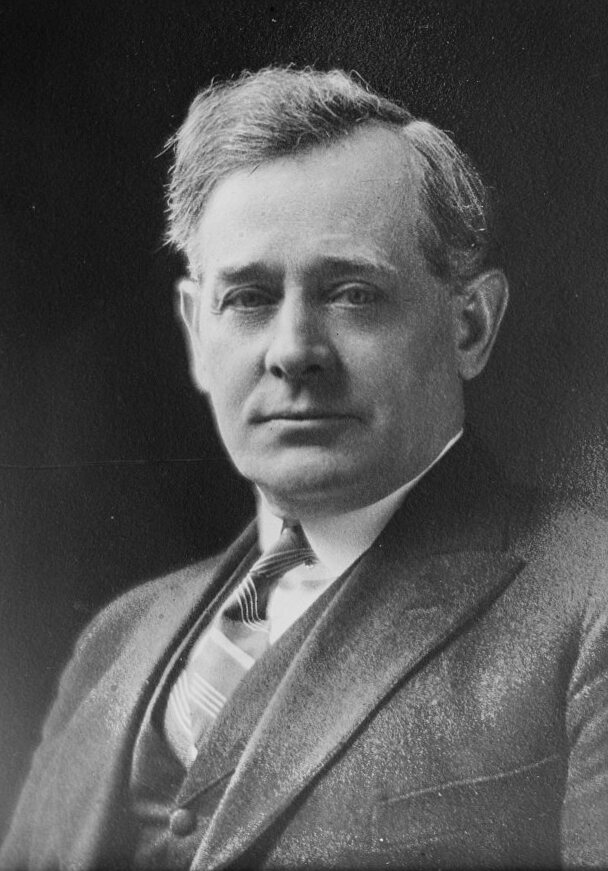
- Murdock, c. 1925

Member of Parliament for Kent
- In office 1922–1925
- Preceded by: Archibald McCoig
- Succeeded by: Alexander Dew Chaplin

Canadian Senator from Ontario
- In office 1930–1949
- Appointed by: William Lyon Mackenzie King

Personal details
- Born: August 15, 1871 Brighton, England
- Died: May 15, 1949 (aged 77)
- Party: Liberal
- Cabinet: Minister of Labour (1921–1925)
- Committees: Chair, Standing Committee on Immigration and Labour (1945–1947)

James Murdock, PC (August 15, 1871 – May 15, 1949) was a Canadian politician.

== Background ==
Born in Brighton, England, Murdock first ran for the House of Commons of Canada as the Liberal candidate in the 1921 federal election in the Ontario riding of Toronto South. Although defeated, he was appointed Minister of Labour in the cabinet of Mackenzie King shortly after the election. The incumbent MP in the riding of Kent, Archibald McCoig, gave up his seat and was appointed to the Senate of Canada in 1922. Murdock was acclaimed to this seat in the resulting 1922 by-election.

While Minister of Labour in 1923, Murdock was embroiled in controversy after he withdrew funds from the Home Bank of Canada a day or two before its collapse based on information he obtained as a member of the Cabinet.

He was defeated in the 1925 election in the riding of Toronto—High Park and again in 1926.

In 1930, he was summoned to the Senate representing the senatorial division of Parkdale, Ontario on the advice of Prime Minister Mackenzie King. He served until his death in 1949.
