= Kent East (federal electoral district) =

Former federal electoral district in Ontario, Canada

Ontario electoral district

Defunct federal electoral district
- Legislature: House of Commons
- District created: 1903
- District abolished: 1914
- First contested: 1904
- Last contested: 1911

Demographics
- Census division: Kent County
- Census subdivision(s): Bothwell, Camden, Chatham Township, Dresden, Howard, Orford, Ridgetown, Thamesville, Wallaceburg, Zone

Kent East was a federal electoral district (or riding) represented in the House of Commons of Canada from 1904 to 1917. It was located in the province of Ontario. This riding was created in 1903 when Kent riding was divided into two ridings: Kent East and Kent West. It incorporated parts of Bothwell and Elgin West ridings.

The west riding consisted of the townships of Camden, Chatham, Howard, Orford and Zone, the towns of Bothwell, Dresden, Ridgetown and Wallaceburg, and the village of Thamesville.

The electoral district was abolished in 1914 when it was merged back into Kent riding.

== Members of Parliament ==
This riding has elected the following members of Parliament:

Parliament	Years	Member	Party
Riding created from Kent
10th	1904–1908	David Alexander Gordon	Liberal
11th	1908–1911	David Alexander Gordon	Liberal
12th	1911–1917	David Alexander Gordon	Liberal
Riding dissolved into Kent

== Election results ==
1904 Canadian federal election
Party	Candidate	Votes
Liberal	David A. Gordon	2,848
Conservative	Benjamin W. Wilson	2,476

1908 Canadian federal election
Party	Candidate	Votes
Liberal	David A. Gordon	2,895
Conservative	Samuel Stewart	2,403

1911 Canadian federal election
Party	Candidate	Votes
Liberal	David A. Gordon	2,604
Conservative	Harry James French	2,321

== See also ==
- List of Canadian electoral districts
- Historical federal electoral districts of Canada
