= James Eber Caldwell =

Canadian politician

James Eber "Jim" Caldwell (born July 20, 1943) was a Progressive Conservative party member of the House of Commons of Canada. He was a broadcaster by career and host of the locally broadcast "Agriscope".

Born in Ottawa, Ontario, Caldwell was first elected in the Essex—Kent electoral district in the 1984 federal election. He left federal politics after serving in the 33rd Canadian Parliament after his defeat to Jerry Pickard of the Liberal party in the 1988 federal election.

Parliament of Canada
Preceded by Robert Daudlin	Member of Parliament for Essex—Kent; 1984–1988	Succeeded by Jerry Pickard
