= Alexander Dew Chaplin =

Canadian politician

Member of Parliament for Kent, Ontario
- In office October 1925 – September 1926
- Preceded by: James Murdock
- Succeeded by: James Rutherford

Personal details
- Born: Alexander Dew Chaplin; 10 April 1872 Port Granby, Ontario
- Died: 18 January 1938 (aged 65) Chatham, Ontario
- Party: Conservative
- Spouse(s): Edith Anne Jackson m. 25 October 1911
- Profession: manufacturer

Alexander Dew Chaplin (10 April 1872 – 18 January 1938) was a Canadian businessman and politician. Chaplin was a Conservative member of the House of Commons of Canada. He was born in Port Granby, Ontario and became a manufacturer.

The son of William Lamont Chaplin and Harriet Dew, he was educated in St. Catharines, Ontario and Toronto, Ontario.

Chaplin was managing director and secretary-treasurer for the Chatham, Ontario based Hayes Wheel Company of Canada and was first elected to Parliament at the Kent, Ontario riding in the 1925 general election. After serving one term in Parliament, Chaplin was defeated in the 1926 federal election by James Rutherford of the Liberal party.

His brother James Dew and his nephew Gordon Chaplin also served in the House of Commons.
