= Earl Desmond =

Canadian politician

Member of Parliament for Kent
- In office March 1940 – June 1949
- Preceded by: Arthur Lisle Thompson
- Succeeded by: Blake Huffman

Personal details
- Born: Clayton Earl Desmond; 9 March 1894 Morpeth, Ontario, Canada
- Died: 14 July 1968 (aged 74) Chatham, Ontario, Canada
- Party: Progressive Conservative; National Government
- Spouse(s): Maribel Fraser m. 17 August 1918
- Profession: farmer

Clayton Earl Desmond (9 March 1894 – 14 July 1968) was a National Government and Progressive Conservative party member of the House of Commons of Canada. He was born in Morpeth, Ontario and became a farmer by career.

He was first elected to Parliament at the Kent riding in the 1940 general election under the National Government affiliation, then re-elected as a Progressive Conservative for a second term in 1945. He was defeated by Blake Huffman of the Liberal party in the 1949 election.
