= Bob Izumi =

Canadian professional angler

Bob Izumi (born May 2, 1958) is a Canadian professional angler, and the host of Bob Izumi's Real Fishing Show. He is most known for his success in bass fishing, and has won numerous bass tournaments.

== Early life ==
Izumi was born in Blenheim, Ontario, after his parents, Joe and Margaret Izumi, moved in 1957 from Toronto. His father, Joe Izumi, founded Canada's first bass fishing tournament on Rondeau Bay. His family, originally from Vancouver Island, were displaced to Canada's Japanese internment camps following the attack on Pearl Harbor in 1941.

His family's fishing influenced Izumi while growing up, winning his first fishing derby when he was 8, and becoming one of Canada's first professional fishers at 20.

== Real Fishing Show ==
At a family picnic, a family member brought up the possibility of him starting a fishing television show. Izumi had been hired to do seminars before that time, and the thought of a television show intrigued him. He filmed a pilot episode, and the show was soon picked up and ran by various networks in 1983, including WFN and Global Television Network.

In 2022, the Real Fishing Show completed its run after 38 seasons.

== Personal life ==
His brother, Wayne Izumi, is also a professional angler. Izumi has a wife and two children.

== Philanthropy ==
Izumi and his brother, Wayne, founded conservation organisation Fishing Forever. The organisation is a funding agency for conservation efforts and fisheries projects across Ontario.

== Awards and achievements ==
Izumi won the Canadian Open for the years 1994 to 1996, during which he also obtained the Triple Crown, the Classic Championship, and an Angler of the Year in the respective 1995 season.

In 2009, Izumi was inducted into the Canadian Angler Hall of Fame.

In 2010, Izumi was inducted into the Town of Milton's Walk of Fame.

In 2012, the Canadian Safe Boating Council (CASBA) granted Izumi a Special Recognition Award for his promotion of boat safety and wearing lifejackets on his long-running show Real Fishing.
