= Arthur Lisle Thompson =

Canadian politician

Member of Parliament for Kent
- In office December 1939 – March 1940
- Preceded by: James Warren Rutherford
- Succeeded by: Earl Desmond

Personal details
- Born: Arthur Lisle Thompson; 19 June 1884 Mooresville, Ontario, Canada
- Died: 1 February 1949 (aged 64)
- Party: Liberal
- Spouse(s): Ina B. Smith m. 29 April 1913
- Profession: implement agent

Arthur Lisle Thompson (19 June 1884 – 1 February 1949) was a Liberal party member of the House of Commons of Canada. He was born in Mooresville, Ontario and became an implement agent.

Thompson was an alderman of Chatham, Ontario from 1922 to 1925. He was the city's mayor in 1926 and 1927 then city manager from 1928 to 1935.

He was acclaimed to Parliament at the Kent riding by in a by-election on 11 December 1939 following the death of incumbent James Warren Rutherford. After serving the remainder of the 18th Canadian Parliament, Thompson was defeated by Earl Desmond of the National Government (Conservative) Party.

== See also ==
- Politics of Canada
