= James Rutherford (Canadian politician) =

Canadian politician

Member of Parliament for Kent
- In office September 1926 – February 1939
- Preceded by: Alexander Dew Chaplin
- Succeeded by: Arthur Lisle Thompson

Personal details
- Born: James Warren Rutherford; 22 August 1875 McKay's Corners, Ontario, Canada
- Died: 27 February 1939 (aged 63)
- Party: Liberal
- Spouse(s): Jessie Taylor m. 11 June 1902
- Profession: physician, surgeon

James Warren Rutherford (22 August 1875 – 27 February 1939) was a Liberal party member of the House of Commons of Canada. He was born in McKay's Corners in Kent County, Ontario, becoming a physician and surgeon.

Rutherford attended Chatham Collegiate Institute, the University of Toronto then University College London for postgraduate studies.

He was first elected to Parliament at the Kent riding in the 1926 general election after an unsuccessful campaign there in 1925. Rutherford was re-elected in 1930 and 1935.

During the 1935 campaign, Rutherford sustained a fracture in the neck area after his car overturned near Ridgetown, Ontario. His vehicle travelled on loose gravel which led his vehicle into a ditch. Rutherford was unable to continue his medical practice after this, although his injuries healed to a partial extent.

On 27 February 1939, Rutherford died before completing his term in the 18th Canadian Parliament, survived by his wife, a son and daughter.
