= Archibald McCoig =

Canadian politician

The Honourable Archibald Blake McCoig

Canadian Senator from Ontario
- In office 1922–1927
- Appointed by: William Lyon Mackenzie King

Member of Parliament for Kent
- In office 1917–1922
- Preceded by: District was created in 1914
- Succeeded by: James Murdock

Member of Parliament for Kent West
- In office 1908–1917
- Preceded by: Herbert Sylvester Clements
- Succeeded by: District was abolished in 1917

Member of the Legislative Assembly of Ontario for Kent West
- In office 1905–1908
- Preceded by: Thomas Letson Pardo
- Succeeded by: George William Sulman

Personal details
- Born: April 8, 1873 Tilbury East, Ontario, Canada
- Died: November 21, 1927 (aged 54)
- Party: Liberal

Archibald Blake McCoig (April 8, 1873 – November 21, 1927) was a Canadian politician.

== Background ==
Born in Tilbury East, Ontario, the son of Daniel McCoig, a Scottish immigrant, he was elected as a Liberal candidate to the Legislative Assembly of Ontario for the provincial riding of Kent West in the 1905 election. In 1908, he was elected to the House of Commons of Canada for the federal riding of Kent West. A Liberal, he was re-elected in 1911, 1917, and 1921. In 1922, he was called to the Senate of Canada representing the senatorial division of Kent, Ontario to allow James Murdock, the Minister of Labour, to take his seat. He served until his death in 1927.

McCoig married Adele M. Demarse in 1898. He served on the Chatham town council.
