= Rufus Stephenson =

Canadian politician

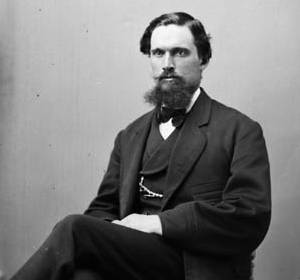
Rufus Stephenson Source: Library and Archives Canada

Rufus Stephenson (January 14, 1835 – February 15, 1901) was an Ontario newspaper editor and political figure. He represented Kent in the House of Commons of Canada as a Conservative member from 1867 to 1882.

He was born in Springfield, Massachusetts in 1835, the son of Eli Stephenson and Chloe Chapin. He was educated at the Grantham Academy in St. Catharines, Province of Canada. Stephenson worked as a printer in St. Catharines and came to Chatham around 1850. With Charles Stuart, he took over the ownership of the Western Planet, later the Chatham Planet, which he managed until 1878. He was elected to the town council in 1861, served as reeve in 1863 and mayor in 1865-1866. He served as government whip from 1878 to 1882. After he retired from federal politics, he served as customs collector at Chatham until his death in 1901. Stephenson was a member of the Freemasons.

In 1854, he married Georgianna Emma Andrew.

== Electoral record ==
1867 Canadian federal election
Party	Candidate	Votes
Conservative	STEPHENSON, Rufus	1,524
Unknown	MCKELLAR, Archibald	1,427

1872 Canadian federal election
Party	Candidate	Votes
Conservative	STEPHENSON, Rufus	1,874
Unknown	STRIPP, Wm. S.	1,730

1874 Canadian federal election
Party	Candidate	Votes
Conservative	STEPHENSON, Rufus	1,895
Unknown	STRIPP, Wm. S.	1,823

1878 Canadian federal election
Party	Candidate	Votes
Conservative	STEPHENSON, Rufus	2,502
Unknown	MCMAHON, H.	1,969
