= Elliott Hardey =

Canadian politician

Elliott William Hardey

Member of the Canadian Parliament for Kent
- In office 1984–1988
- Preceded by: Maurice Bossy
- Succeeded by: Rex Crawford

Personal details
- Born: 3 January 1932 (age 94) Chatham, Ontario
- Party: Progressive Conservative
- Spouse: B. Corinne Hunter (m. 11 November 1955)
- Occupation: Farmer

Elliott William Hardey (born 3 January 1932) was a Progressive Conservative party member of the House of Commons of Canada. He was a farmer by career.

Born in Chatham, Ontario, Hardey was first elected at Kent riding in the 1984 federal election, thus he served in the 33rd Canadian Parliament. Hardey left federal politics following the 1988 federal election in which he was defeated by Rex Crawford of the Liberal party.
