= Dave Van Kesteren =

Canadian politician

Member of Parliament for Chatham-Kent—Leamington Chatham-Kent—Essex (2006–2015)
- In office January 23, 2006 – September 11, 2019
- Preceded by: Jerry Pickard
- Succeeded by: Dave Epp

Personal details
- Born: October 7, 1955 (age 70) Chatham, Ontario, Canada
- Party: Conservative
- Spouse: Faye Van Kesteren
- Profession: Automobile dealer

David E. Van Kesteren (born October 7, 1955) is a Canadian politician. A member of the Conservative Party of Canada, he was the member of the House of Commons for the riding of Chatham-Kent—Leamington (known as Chatham-Kent—Essex until 2015) from the 2006 election until 2019.

A child of Dutch parents (his father was born in Noordwijk, his mother in Schoonhoven), Van Kesteren was born two years after his parents emigrated to Canada. Van Kesteren, who is married and has eight children and twenty one grandchildren, owns a Hyundai car dealership, Van Kesteren Auto Sales, which he founded in 1987. He is a charter member of the Chatham Sunrise Rotary Club and past president of the Chatham Christian Business Association.

First elected in the 2006 federal election, Van Kesteren defeated Liberal candidate Jim Comiskey by 5,616 votes in the then riding of Chatham-Kent—Essex. Previously, Van Kesteren had narrowly lost the 2004 election to Liberal incumbent Jerry Pickard by only 407 votes.

== Electoral record ==
2015 Canadian federal election: Chatham-Kent—Leamington
Party	Candidate	Votes	%	±%	Expenditures
Conservative	Dave Van Kesteren	21,677	41.71	-11.49	$119,230.26
Liberal	Katie Omstead	19,351	37.23	+20.95	$64,239.01
New Democratic	Tony Walsh	9,549	18.37	-8.79	$12,638.15
Green	Mark Vercouteren	1,394	2.68	-0.66	$1,379.30
Total valid votes/expense limit		51,971	100.00		$213,665.70
Total rejected ballots		263	0.50	–	
Turnout		52,234	65.99	–	
Eligible voters		79,160			
Conservative notional hold		Swing		-16.22	
Source: Elections Canada

2011 Canadian federal election: Chatham-Kent—Essex
Party	Candidate	Votes	%	±%	Expenditures
Conservative	Dave Van Kesteren	23,360	53.8	+5.9	–
New Democratic	Ron Franko	11,449	26.3	+9.8	–
Liberal	Matt Daudlin	7,172	16.5	-12.6	–
Green	Rob Hodgson	1,470	3.4	+0.5	–
Total valid votes		43,451	100.0	–	
Total rejected ballots		221	0.05		
Turnout		43,672	59.43		
Total eligible voters		73,484			

2008 Canadian federal election: Chatham-Kent—Essex
Party	Candidate	Votes	%	±%	Expenditures
Conservative	Dave Van Kesteren	19,960	47.9	+5.1	$70,361
Liberal	Matt Daudlin	12,127	29.1	-2.2	$46,213
New Democratic	Ron Cadotte	6,850	16.5	-5.9	$6,134
Green	Alina Abbott	2,712	6.5	+2.9	$1,214
Total valid votes/Expense limit		41,649	100.0	$82,648	
Total rejected ballots		–			
Turnout		–			

2006 Canadian federal election: Chatham-Kent—Essex
Party	Candidate	Votes	%	±%
Conservative	Dave Van Kesteren	20,820	42.8	+5.1
Liberal	Jim Comiskey	15,204	31.3	-8.3
New Democratic	Kathleen Kevany	10,875	22.4	+5.3
Green	Ken Bell	1,737	3.6	-0.6
Total valid votes		48,636	100.0	

2004 Canadian federal election: Chatham-Kent—Essex
Party	Candidate	Votes	%	±%
Liberal	Jerry Pickard	17,435	39.6	-10.1
Conservative	Dave Van Kesteren	17,028	38.7	-3.7
New Democratic	Kathleen Kevany	7,538	17.1	+11.6
Green	Rod Hetherington	1,845	4.2	+2.4
Marxist–Leninist	Margaret Mondaca	150	0.3	
Total valid votes		43,996	100.0	
