= Essex—Kent =

Former federal electoral district in Ontario, Canada

Ontario electoral district

Defunct federal electoral district
- Legislature: House of Commons
- District created: 1976
- District abolished: 1996
- First contested: 1979
- Last contested: 1993

Essex—Kent was a federal electoral district in Ontario that was represented in the House of Commons of Canada from 1979 to 1997.

It was created in 1976 from parts of Essex—Windsor, Kent—Essex and Lambton—Kent ridings, and initially consisted of the Townships of Colchester South, Gosfield North, Gosfield South, Mersea and Pelee, in the County of Essex, but excluding the Town of Essex, and Townships of Harwich, Raleigh, Romney and Tilbury East, including the Town of Tilbury, in the County of Kent.

In 1987, Essex—Kent was re-defined to consist of the towns of Harrow, Kingsville and Leamington and the townships of Colchester North, Colchester South, Gosfield North, Gosfield South, Mersea and Pelee in the County of Essex, and the towns of Blenheim and Tilbury and the villages of Erieau, Erie Beach and Wheatley in the County of Kent.

The electoral district was redistributed in 1996 into Essex and Kent—Essex ridings.

== Members of Parliament ==
This riding has elected the following members of Parliament:

Parliament	Years	Member	Party
Riding created from Kent—Essex, Essex—Windsor and Lambton—Kent
31st	1979–1980	Robert Daudlin	Liberal
32nd	1980–1984	Robert Daudlin	Liberal
33rd	1984–1988	James Eber Caldwell	Progressive Conservative
34th	1988–1993	Jerry Pickard	Liberal
35th	1993–1997	Jerry Pickard	Liberal
Riding dissolved into Essex and Kent—Essex

== Electoral history ==
1979 Canadian federal election
Party	Candidate	Votes
Liberal	Robert Daudlin	14,457
Progressive Conservative	David Conklin	13,181
New Democratic	Ralph Wensley	4,759

1980 Canadian federal election
Party	Candidate	Votes
Liberal	Robert Daudlin	16,898
Progressive Conservative	Hank Vanderpol	9,930
New Democratic	David Wurfel	5,083

1984 Canadian federal election
Party	Candidate	Votes
Progressive Conservative	James Eber Caldwell	18,661
Liberal	Hugo Tiessen	9,268
New Democratic	Peter Toye	4,234

1988 Canadian federal election
Party	Candidate	Votes
Liberal	Jerry Pickard	18,634
Progressive Conservative	James Eber Caldwell	12,181
New Democratic	John Coggans	6,935

1993 Canadian federal election
Party	Candidate	Votes
Liberal	Jerry Pickard	21,865
Reform	Wayne Abbott	6,411
Progressive Conservative	Kevin Charles Flood	4,742
New Democratic	Mike Darnell	2,005
Natural Law	Lester Newby	226

== See also ==
- List of Canadian electoral districts
- Historical federal electoral districts of Canada
