= Kent—Essex (federal electoral district) =

Former federal electoral district in Ontario, Canada

Ontario electoral district

Defunct federal electoral district
- Legislature: House of Commons
- District created: 1966
- District abolished: 1976
- First contested: 1968
- Last contested: 1974

Kent—Essex was a federal electoral district (riding) in Ontario, Canada, that was represented in the House of Commons of Canada from 1968 to 1979.

It was created in the redistribution of 1966 from parts of Essex South and Kent ridings.

It consisted of Point Pelee National Park and the Townships of Gosfield South, Mersea, Pelee and Gosfield North, excepting the Town of Essex in the County of Essex; and the City of Chatham, the Town of Tilbury and the Townships of Raleigh, Romney and Tilbury East in the County of Kent.

It was eliminated in the redistribution of 1976 when it was divided between Essex—Kent and Kent ridings.

== Members of Parliament ==
This riding elected the following members of Parliament:

Parliament	Years	Member	Party
Riding created from Kent and Essex South
28th	1968–1972	Harold Danforth	Progressive Conservative
29th	1972–1974	Harold Danforth	Progressive Conservative
30th	1974–1979	Robert Daudlin	Liberal
Riding dissolved into Kent and Essex—Kent

== Election results ==
1968 Canadian federal election
Party	Candidate	Votes
Progressive Conservative	Harold Danforth	15,195
Liberal	Thomas Henry	13,077
New Democratic	John Wood	2,528

1972 Canadian federal election
Party	Candidate	Votes
Progressive Conservative	Harold Danforth	18,837
Liberal	Brady Hinnegan	11,981
New Democratic	Jacob Vellinga	4,559

1974 Canadian federal election
Party	Candidate	Votes
Liberal	Robert Daudlin	17,800
Progressive Conservative	Harold Danforth	14,641
New Democratic	Ronald Franko	3,558

== See also ==
- List of Canadian electoral districts
- Historical federal electoral districts of Canada
