= Chatham-Kent—Essex (federal electoral district) =

Former federal electoral district in Ontario, Canada

Coordinates: 42.277°N 82.288°W

Ontario electoral district
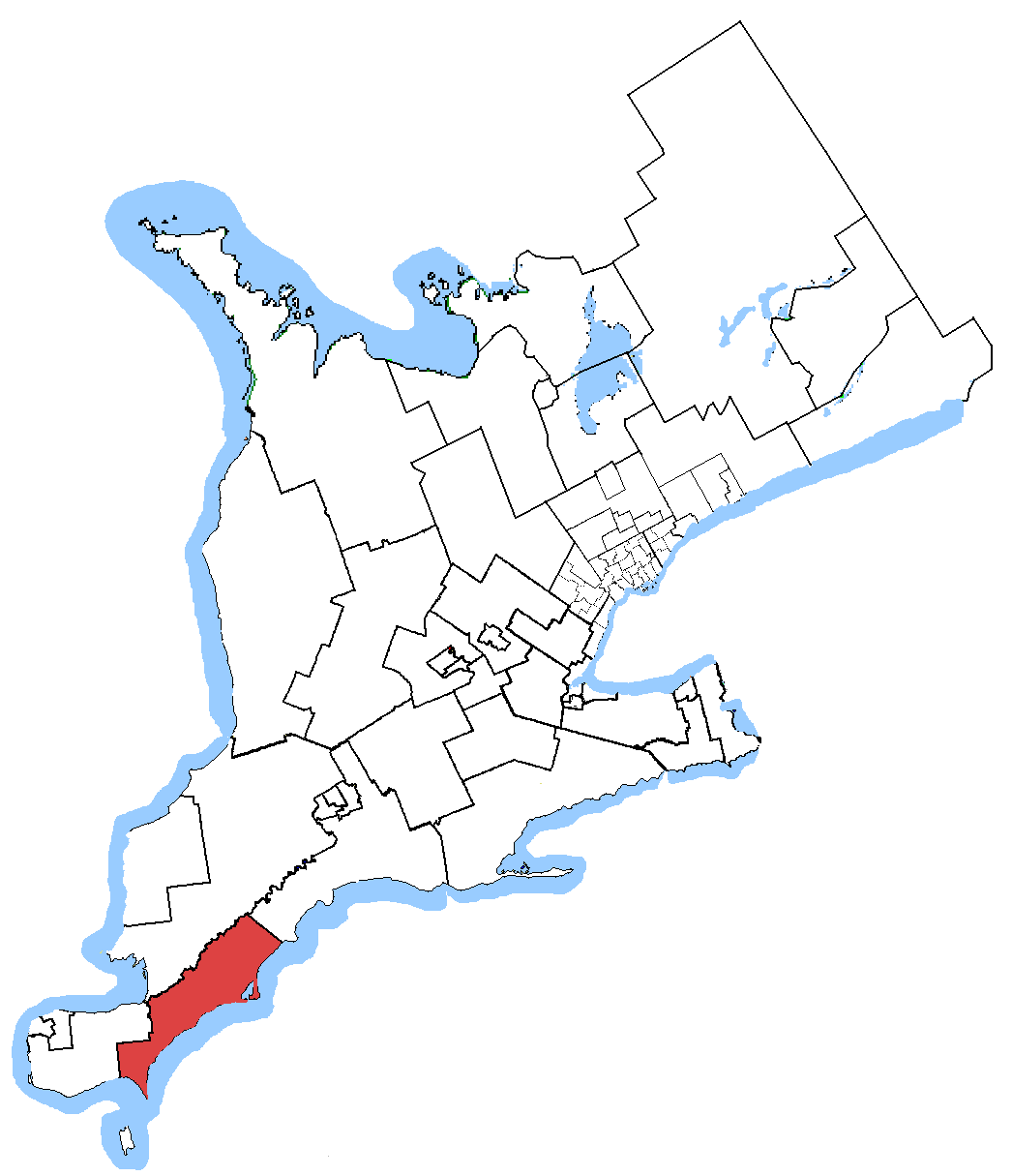
- Chatham-Kent—Essex in relation to other southern Ontario electoral districts

Defunct federal electoral district
- Legislature: House of Commons
- District created: 1996
- District abolished: 2013
- First contested: 1997
- Last contested: 2011
- District webpage: profile, map

Demographics
- Population (2011): 105,579
- Electors (2011): 74,973
- Area (km²): 1,795.47
- Census division(s): Chatham-Kent, Essex
- Census subdivision(s): Chatham-Kent, Leamington, Moravian 47

Chatham-Kent—Essex (formerly known as Kent—Essex) was a federal electoral district in Ontario, Canada, that was represented in the House of Commons of Canada from 1997 to 2015.

== Federal riding ==
The federal riding was created in 1996 as "Kent—Essex" from Essex—Kent and Kent ridings. Its name was changed to the present name in 1998.

The riding includes the Municipality of Chatham-Kent located south of the Thames River, the former City of Chatham, the Town of Leamington, and the Indian reserve of Moravian 47. The population in 2001 was 106,144 and the area is 1,924 km^{2}.

=== Members of Parliament ===
This riding has elected the following members of the members of Parliament:

| Parliament | Years | Member | Party |
|---|---|---|---|
Kent—Essex; Riding created from Essex—Kent and Kent
| 36th | 1997–2000 | Jerry Pickard | Liberal |
Chatham-Kent—Essex
| 37th | 2000–2004 | Jerry Pickard | Liberal |
| 38th | 2004–2006 | Jerry Pickard | Liberal |
| 39th | 2006–2008 | Dave Van Kesteren | Conservative |
| 40th | 2008–2011 | Dave Van Kesteren | Conservative |
| 41st | 2011–2015 | Dave Van Kesteren | Conservative |
Riding dissolved into Chatham-Kent—Leamington

== Politics ==
The riding is evenly divided between urban and rural voters, so both manufacturing and agricultural issues sway the results.

Jerry Pickard retired just before the 2006 election campaign, and the federal Conservatives won this riding in the January 23, 2006 election on the back of a promise to help farmers by scrapping the CAIS program. Area farmers believe this promise has not been kept, but the Conservatives held on to the riding in 2008 and 2011.

== Federal election results ==
=== Chatham-Kent—Essex ===
2011 Canadian federal election
| Party | Candidate | Votes | % | ±% | Expenditures |
|---|---|---|---|---|---|
| Conservative | Dave Van Kesteren | 23,360 | 53.8 | +5.9 | – |
| New Democratic | Ron Franko | 11,449 | 26.3 | +9.8 | – |
| Liberal | Matt Daudlin | 7,172 | 16.5 | -12.6 | – |
| Green | Rob Hodgson | 1,470 | 3.4 | +0.5 | – |
| Total valid votes | | 43,451 | 100.0 | – | |
| Total rejected ballots | | 221 | 0.05 | | |
| Turnout | | 43,672 | 59.43 | | |
| Total eligible voters | | 73,484 | | | |

2008 Canadian federal election
| Party | Candidate | Votes | % | ±% | Expenditures |
|---|---|---|---|---|---|
| Conservative | Dave Van Kesteren | 19,960 | 47.9 | +5.1 | $70,361 |
| Liberal | Matt Daudlin | 12,127 | 29.1 | -2.2 | $46,213 |
| New Democratic | Ron Cadotte | 6,850 | 16.5 | -5.9 | $6,134 |
| Green | Alina Abbott | 2,712 | 6.5 | +2.9 | $1,214 |
| Total valid votes/Expense limit | | 41,649 | 100.0 | $82,648 | |
| Total rejected ballots | | – | | | |
| Turnout | | – | | | |

2006 Canadian federal election
| Party | Candidate | Votes | % | ±% |
|---|---|---|---|---|
| Conservative | Dave Van Kesteren | 20,820 | 42.8 | +5.1 |
| Liberal | Jim Comiskey | 15,204 | 31.3 | -8.3 |
| New Democratic | Kathleen Kevany | 10,875 | 22.4 | +5.3 |
| Green | Ken Bell | 1,737 | 3.6 | -0.6 |
| Total valid votes | | 48,636 | 100.0 | |

2004 Canadian federal election
| Party | Candidate | Votes | % | ±% |
|---|---|---|---|---|
| Liberal | Jerry Pickard | 17,435 | 39.6 | -10.1 |
| Conservative | Dave Van Kesteren | 17,028 | 38.7 | -3.7 |
| New Democratic | Kathleen Kevany | 7,538 | 17.1 | +11.6 |
| Green | Rod Hetherington | 1,845 | 4.2 | +2.4 |
| Marxist–Leninist | Margaret Mondaca | 150 | 0.3 | |
| Total valid votes | | 43,996 | 100.0 | |

Note: Conservative vote is compared to the total of the Canadian Alliance vote and Progressive Conservative vote in 2000 election.

2000 Canadian federal election
| Party | Candidate | Votes | % | ±% |
|---|---|---|---|---|
| Liberal | Jerry Pickard | 20,085 | 49.7 | -0.5 |
| Alliance | Sean Smart | 12,957 | 32.1 | +11.1 |
| Progressive Conservative | Ryan Bailey | 4,156 | 10.3 | -5.2 |
| New Democratic | Susan MacKay | 2,209 | 5.5 | -4.7 |
| Green | Bobby Clarke | 715 | 1.8 | +1.1 |
| Canadian Action | Dudley Smith | 213 | 0.5 | -0.6 |
| Independent | Louis Duke | 73 | 0.2 | |
| Total valid votes | | 40,408 | 100.0 | |

Note: Canadian Alliance vote is compared to the Reform vote in 1997 election.

=== Kent—Essex ===
1997 Canadian federal election
| Party | Candidate | Votes | % |
|---|---|---|---|
| Liberal | Jerry Pickard | 21,451 | 50.2 |
| Reform | Don R. Clarke | 8,941 | 20.9 |
| Progressive Conservative | Jim Hawryluk | 6,634 | 15.5 |
| New Democratic | Derry McKeever | 4,323 | 10.1 |
| Christian Heritage | Roger James | 621 | 1.5 |
| Canadian Action | Victor Knight | 470 | 1.1 |
| Green | Greg Zolad | 291 | 0.7 |
| Total valid votes | | 42,731 | 100.0 |

== See also ==
- List of Canadian electoral districts
- Historical federal electoral districts of Canada
