= George Stephens (Canadian politician) =

Canadian politician

George Stephens (October 6, 1846 – July 17, 1916) was a merchant and political figure in Ontario, Canada. He represented Kent in the House of Commons of Canada from 1900 to 1903 as a Liberal.

He was born in Northumberland County, Canada West, the son of William Henry Stephens and Mary Ann Thorn, and was educated in Chatham. He first entered business in partnership with his older brother, William Henry Stephens Jr., and, in 1872, opened his own hardware business in Chatham. He served as an alderman for Chatham in 1899 and 1900. Stephens was married twice: to Katie Lyell Stringer in 1874 and then to her sister Jean Mather Stringer in 1882. Stephens ran unsuccessfully for reelection in Kent West in 1904 after the Kent riding was divided.
