= Harold Danforth =

Canadian politician

Harold Warren Danforth
- Official 1973 portrait

Member of Parliament for Kent
- In office March 1958 – June 1962

Member of Parliament for Kent
- In office April 1963 – June 1968

Member of Parliament for Kent—Essex
- In office June 1968 – May 1974

Personal details
- Born: 8 April 1916 Leamington, Ontario, Canada
- Died: 7 May 1993 (aged 77)
- Party: Progressive Conservative
- Spouse: Isabel Cora
- Profession: Farmer

Harold Warren Danforth (8 April 1916 – 7 May 1993) was a Progressive Conservative party member of the House of Commons of Canada. Born in Leamington, Ontario, he was a farmer by career.

Danforth attended Ontario Agricultural College after which he farmed in the Blenheim area. He became a local councillor in Blenheim, Ontario between 1956 and 1958 and was then elected at the Kent riding in the 1958 federal election. Although he was defeated in the following federal election in 1962, he won the riding back in the 1963 election and was re-elected in 1965. In 1966, riding boundaries were changed and Danforth won at the new Kent—Essex riding in the 1968 federal election and again in the 1972 election. Danforth left federal politics when he was defeated in the 1974 election by Robert Daudlin of the Liberal party.

== Archives ==
There is a Harold Danforth fonds at Library and Archives Canada. Archival reference number is R5392.
