= Henry Smyth (Canadian politician) =

Canadian politician

Henry Smyth (15 January 1841 – 23 December 1929) was a lawyer and political figure in Ontario, Canada. He represented Kent in the House of Commons of Canada from 1882 to 1887 as a Conservative member.

He was born in Chatham, Upper Canada, the son of William B. Smyth, a native of Ireland, and was educated there and at the Caradoc Academy. In 1862, he married Julia O'Brien. Smyth served as school trustee, town councillor, deputy reeve and reeve; he was also mayor of Chatham from 1869 to 1870 and in 1876. His election in 1882 was overturned in 1883 after an appeal; Smyth won the by-election held in 1884. He was unsuccessful when he ran for reelection in 1887 and 1888.
