= Kent (Ontario federal electoral district) =

Former federal electoral district in Ontario, Canada

Ontario electoral district

Defunct federal electoral district
- Legislature: House of Commons
- District created: 1867, 1914
- District abolished: 1903, 1996
- First contested: 1867
- Last contested: 1993

Kent was a federal electoral district (riding) represented in the House of Commons of Canada from 1867 to 1904, 1917 to 1968, and 1979 to 1997. It was located in the province of Ontario and was created by the British North America Act 1867.

== Geographic history ==
Kent initially consisted of the Townships of Chatham, Dover, East Tilbury, Romney, Raleigh, and Harwich, and the Town of Chatham. In 1882, the township of Chatham was excluded from the riding, and the village of Blenheim was added.

The electoral district was abolished in 1903 when it was redistributed between Kent East and Kent West ridings.

The electoral district of Kent was recreated from Kent West and Kent East in 1914, and consisted of the county of Kent, excluding the townships of Zone and Camden.

In 1924, it was redefined as consisting of the part of the county of Kent lying west or south of and including the Gore of Chatham, the township of Chatham and the river Thames, but excluding the town of Tilbury and the village of Wheatley.

In 1933, it was redefined as consisting of the county of Kent, excluding the townships of Camden, Gore of Camden, Gore of Chatham and Zone, and including the city of Chatham, the town of Tilbury and the village of Wheatley.

In 1947, it was redefined as consisting of the county of Kent, excluding the townships of Camden and Zone, and that part of the township of Chatham formerly known as the Gore of Chatham; but including the city of Chatham, the town of Tilbury and the village of Wheatley.

The electoral district was abolished in 1966 when it was redistributed between Kent—Essex and Lambton—Kent ridings.

The electoral district of Kent was recreated a second time from Kent—Essex and Lambton—Kent ridings 1976. It consisted of:

(a) the part of the County of Kent lying north and east and including the Township of Dover, the City of Chatham, the Township of Chatham and the Township of Howard to the shore of Lake Erie, and

(b) Indian Reserve No. 46 in the County of Lambton.

In 1987, it was redefined to consist of

(a) the part of the County of Kent lying north and east of and including the Township of Howard, the Township of Chatham, the City of Chatham, and the Township of Dover, and

(b) that part of the County of Lambton contained in Walpole Island Indian Reserve No. 46.

The electoral district was abolished in 1996 when it was redistributed between Kent—Essex and Lambton—Kent—Middlesex ridings.

== Members of Parliament ==
This riding has elected the following members of Parliament:

Parliament	Years	Member	Party
1st	1867–1872	Rufus Stephenson	Conservative
2nd	1872–1874	Rufus Stephenson	Conservative
3rd	1874–1878	Rufus Stephenson	Conservative
4th	1878–1882	Rufus Stephenson	Conservative
5th	1882–1883	Henry Smyth	Conservative
5th	1884–1887	Henry Smyth	Conservative
6th	1887–1887	Archibald Campbell	Liberal
6th	1888–1891	Archibald Campbell	Liberal
7th	1891–1896	Archibald Campbell	Liberal
8th	1896–1900	Archibald Campbell	Liberal
9th	1900–1904	George Stephens	Liberal
Riding dissolved into Kent East and Kent West
Riding re-created from Kent West and Kent East
13th	1917–1921	Archibald McCoig	Opposition (Laurier Liberals)
14th	1921–1922	Archibald McCoig	Liberal
14th	1922–1925	James Murdock	Liberal
15th	1925–1926	Alexander Dew Chaplin	Conservative
16th	1926–1930	James Rutherford	Liberal
17th	1930–1935	James Rutherford	Liberal
18th	1935–1939†	James Rutherford	Liberal
18th	1939–1940	Arthur Lisle Thompson	Liberal
19th	1940–1945	Earl Desmond	National Government
20th	1945–1949	Earl Desmond	Progressive Conservative
21st	1949–1953	Blake Huffman	Liberal
22nd	1953–1957	Blake Huffman	Liberal
23rd	1957–1958	Blake Huffman	Liberal
24th	1958–1962	Harold Danforth	Progressive Conservative
25th	1962–1963	Sidney LeRoi Clunis	Liberal
26th	1963–1965	Harold Danforth	Progressive Conservative
27th	1965–1968	Harold Danforth	Progressive Conservative
Riding dissolved into Kent—Essex and Lambton—Kent
Riding re-created from Kent—Essex and Lambton—Kent
31st	1979–1980	John Robert Holmes	Progressive Conservative
32nd	1980–1984	Maurice Bossy	Liberal
33rd	1984–1988	Elliott Hardey	Progressive Conservative
34th	1988–1993	Rex Crawford	Liberal
35th	1993–1997	Rex Crawford	Liberal
Riding dissolved into Kent—Essex and Lambton—Kent—Middlesex

== Election results ==
=== Kent, 1867–1904 ===
1867 Canadian federal election
Party	Candidate	Votes
Conservative	Rufus Stephenson	1,524
Liberal	Archibald McKellar	1,427

1872 Canadian federal election
Party	Candidate	Votes
Conservative	Rufus Stephenson	1,874
Unknown	Wm. S. Stripp	1,730

1874 Canadian federal election
Party	Candidate	Votes
Conservative	Rufus Stephenson	1,895
Unknown	Wm. S. Stripp	1,823

1878 Canadian federal election
Party	Candidate	Votes
Conservative	Rufus Stephenson	2,502
Unknown	H. McMahon	1,969

1882 Canadian federal election
Party	Candidate	Votes
Conservative	Henry Smyth	2,223
Unknown	Jas. Samson	2,066

On the election being declared void, 31 December 1883:

By-election on 29 January 1884
Party	Candidate	Votes
Conservative	Henry Smyth	2,548
Unknown	James Samson	2,266

1887 Canadian federal election
Party	Candidate	Votes
Liberal	Archibald Campbell	2,982
Conservative	Henry Smyth	2,870

On Mr. Campbell being unseated, 17 November 1887:

By-election on 2 May 1888
Party	Candidate	Votes
Liberal	Archibald Campbell	2,679
Conservative	Henry Smyth	2,585

1891 Canadian federal election
Party	Candidate	Votes
Liberal	Archibald Campbell	3,138
Conservative	William P. Killackey	2,662

1896 Canadian federal election
Party	Candidate	Votes
Liberal	Archibald Campbell	3,315
Conservative	W. Ball	3,158

1900 Canadian federal election
Party	Candidate	Votes
Liberal	George Stephens	3,390
Conservative	Theodore A. Smith	3,173

=== Kent, 1917–1968 ===
1917 Canadian federal election
Party	Candidate	Votes
Opposition (Laurier Liberals)	Archibald McCoig	7,402
Independent Liberal	John Warcup Plewes	6,313

1921 Canadian federal election
Party	Candidate	Votes
Liberal	Archibald McCoig	11,093
Progressive	Duncan Robert McDiarmid	7,211
Conservative	Wm. Andrew Hammond	5,288

On Mr. McCoig being called to the Senate, 4 January 1922:

By-election on 19 January 1922
Party	Candidate	Votes
Liberal	James Murdock	acclaimed

1925 Canadian federal election
Party	Candidate	Votes
Conservative	Alexander Dew Chaplin	8,396
Liberal	James Rutherford	7,833
Unknown	John Wesley Ward	4,461

1926 Canadian federal election
Party	Candidate	Votes
Liberal	James Rutherford	12,315
Conservative	Alexander Dew Chaplin	10,578

1930 Canadian federal election
Party	Candidate	Votes
Liberal	James Rutherford	12,179
Conservative	Calvert Stanley Stonehouse	10,765

1935 Canadian federal election
Party	Candidate	Votes
Liberal	James Rutherford	11,281
Reconstruction	Frederick Arthur Leverton	7,588

On Mr. Rutherford's death, 27 February 1939:

By-election on 11 December 1939
Party	Candidate	Votes
Liberal	Arthur Lisle Thompson	acclaimed

1940 Canadian federal election
Party	Candidate	Votes
National Government	Earl Desmond	11,629
Liberal	Arthur Lisle Thompson	10,945

1945 Canadian federal election
Party	Candidate	Votes
Progressive Conservative	Earl Desmond	12,706
Liberal	William David Colby	10,490
Co-operative Commonwealth	Duncan Robert McDiarmid	1,291

1949 Canadian federal election
Party	Candidate	Votes
Liberal	Blake Huffman	14,903
Progressive Conservative	Earl Desmond	12,444
Co-operative Commonwealth	Kenneth Simpson	949

1953 Canadian federal election
Party	Candidate	Votes
Liberal	Blake Huffman	15,532
Progressive Conservative	Eugene King	10,496

1957 Canadian federal election
Party	Candidate	Votes
Liberal	Blake Huffman	13,977
Progressive Conservative	Albert Evans Jolley	10,907
Social Credit	Enos B. Brubacher	1,792

1958 Canadian federal election
Party	Candidate	Votes
Progressive Conservative	Harold Danforth	17,348
Liberal	Blake Huffman	13,005
Social Credit	Enos B. Brubacher	661

1962 Canadian federal election
Party	Candidate	Votes
Liberal	Sidney LeRoi Clunis	15,362
Progressive Conservative	Harold Danforth	14,280
Social Credit	Harold G. Youcke	629

1963 Canadian federal election
Party	Candidate	Votes
Progressive Conservative	Harold Danforth	15,381
Liberal	Sidney LeRoi Clunis	15,179
New Democratic	Larry Moore	924
Social Credit	Donald Lawrence Heatherington	388

1965 Canadian federal election
Party	Candidate	Votes
Progressive Conservative	Harold Danforth	15,472
Liberal	George Mickle	13,667
New Democratic	Dianne Mary Fielding	1,231

=== Kent, 1979–1997 ===
1979 Canadian federal election
Party	Candidate	Votes
Progressive Conservative	John Robert Holmes	18,007
Liberal	Fred Reinhardt	11,713
New Democratic	Marie-France Wilkinson	5,047

1980 Canadian federal election
Party	Candidate	Votes
Liberal	Maurice Bossy	15,140
Progressive Conservative	John Robert Holmes	14,293
New Democratic	George McDermott	5,758

1984 Canadian federal election
Party	Candidate	Votes
Progressive Conservative	Elliott Hardey	18,279
Liberal	Maurice Bossy	13,027
New Democratic	Derry McKeever	6,138

1988 Canadian federal election
Party	Candidate	Votes
Liberal	Rex Crawford	15,835
Progressive Conservative	Elliott Hardey	13,835
New Democratic	Leo Rustin	7,948
Christian Heritage	Allan James	1,942

1993 Canadian federal election
Party	Candidate	Votes
Liberal	Rex Crawford	23,216
Reform	Arnold Broeders	5,618
Progressive Conservative	Tom Suitor	5,017
New Democratic	Aaron G. De Meester	1,370
National	Victor Knight	1,014
Natural Law	Marty Howe	146

== See also ==
- List of Canadian electoral districts
- Historical federal electoral districts of Canada
