= 1911 Canadian federal election =

- September 21, 1911

221 seats in the House of Commons 111 seats needed for a majority
- Turnout: 70.2% (▼0.1 pp)

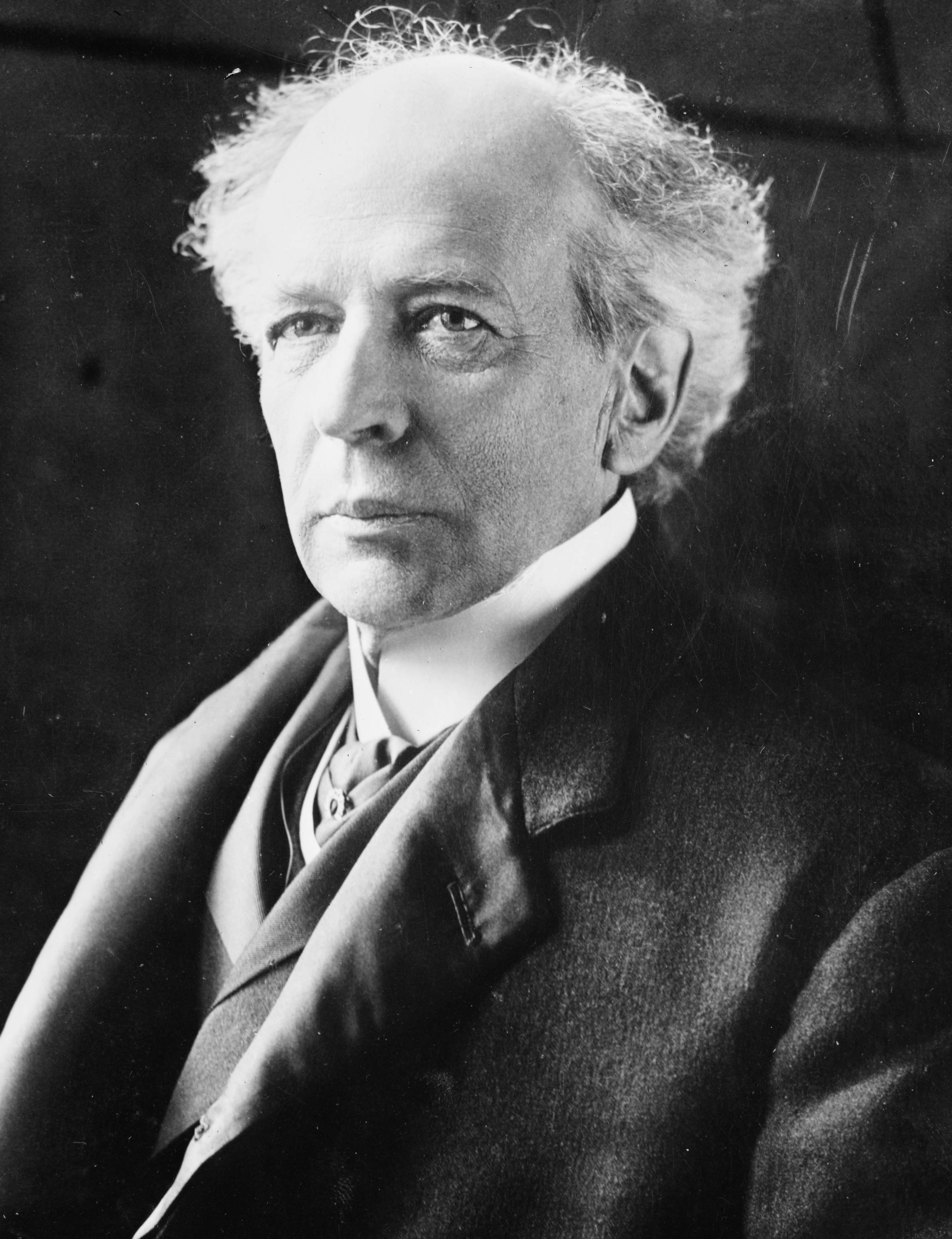
	First party	Second party
Leader	Robert Borden	Wilfrid Laurier
Party	Conservative	Liberal
Leader since	February 6, 1901	June 2, 1887
Leader's seat	Halifax	Soulanges; Quebec East (Note: Laurier was elected in both Soulanges and Quebec East, and chose to serve concurrently as the Member of Parliament for both.)
Last election	85 seats, 46.2%	133 seats, 48.9%
Seats won	132	85
Seat change	▲47	▼48
Popular vote	632,539	596,871
Percentage	48.56%	45.82%
Swing	▲2.35 pp	▼3.05 pp

- The Canadian parliament after the 1911 election
Prime Minister before election
Wilfrid Laurier
Liberal
Prime Minister after election
Robert Borden
Conservative

The 1911 Canadian federal election was held on September 21, 1911, to elect members of the House of Commons of Canada of the 12th Parliament of Canada.

The central issue was Liberal support for a proposed agreement with the United States president William Howard Taft to lower tariffs. The Conservative Party denounced it with claims it would weaken ties with Britain, hurt the Canadian economy and Canadian identity, and lead to American annexation of Canada. The idea of a Canadian Navy was also an issue.

The Conservatives won, and Robert Borden became the eighth prime minister. The election ended 15 years of government by the Liberal Party of Wilfrid Laurier.

== Navy ==
The Liberal government was caught up in a debate over the naval arms race between the British Empire and Germany. Laurier attempted a compromise by starting up the Canadian Navy (now the Royal Canadian Navy) but failed to appease either the French-Canadians or English-Canadians: the former refused giving any aid, and the latter suggested sending money directly to Britain. After the election, the Conservatives drew up a bill for naval contributions to the British, but it was held up by a lengthy Liberal filibuster before it was passed in the House of Commons by invoking closure, only to be defeated by the Liberal-controlled Senate.

== Ties to Britain ==
Many English Canadians in British Columbia and the Maritimes felt that Laurier was abandoning Canada's traditional links to their mother country, Great Britain. On the other side, the Quebec nationalist Henri Bourassa, who had earlier quit the Liberal Party over what he considered the government's pro-British policies, campaigned against Laurier in the province. Ironically, Bourassa's attacks on Laurier in Quebec aided in the election of the Conservatives, who held policies that were more staunchly imperialist than those of the Liberals.

In mid-1910, Laurier had attempted to kill the naval issue, which was setting English-Canadians against French-Canadians by opening talks for a reciprocity treaty with the United States. He believed that an economically favourable treaty would appeal to most Canadians and have the additional benefit of dividing the Conservatives between the western wing of the party, which had long wanted free trade with the United States, and the eastern wing, which was more hostile to Continentalism.

In January 1911, Laurier and US President William Howard Taft announced that they signed a reciprocity agreement, which they decided to pass by concurrent legislation rather than a formal treaty, as would normally have been the case. As such, the reciprocity agreement had to be ratified by both houses of the US Congress rather than just the US Senate, which Laurier would later regret.

== Ties to United States ==
The base of Liberal support shifted to Western Canada, which sought markets for its agricultural products. The party had long been a proponent of free trade with the United States. The protected manufacturing businesses of Central Canada were strongly against the idea. The Liberals, who by ideology and history had strongly supported free trade, decided to make the issue the central plank of their re-election strategy, and they negotiated a free trade agreement in natural products with the United States.

=== Clark speech ===
Allen argues that two speeches by American politicians gave the Conservatives the ammunition needed to arouse anti-American, pro-British sentiments, which provided the winning votes. The Speaker of the US House of Representatives was a Democrat, Champ Clark, and he declared, on the floor of the House, "I look forward to the time when the American flag will fly over every square foot of British North America up to the North Pole. The people of Canada are of our blood and language." Clark went on to suggest in his speech that reciprocity agreement was the first step towards the end of Canada, a speech that was greeted with "prolonged applause" according to the Congressional Record. The Washington Post reported, "Evidently, then, the Democrats generally approved of Mr. Clark's annexation sentiments and voted for the reciprocity bill because, among other things, it improves the prospect of annexation."

The Chicago Tribune, in an editorial, condemned Clark and warned that Clark's speech might have fatally damaged the reciprocity agreement in Canada and stated, "He lets his imagination run wild like a Missouri mule on a rampage. Remarks about the absorption of one country by another grate harshly on the ears of the smaller."

A Republican Representative, William Stiles Bennet, a member of the House Foreign Relations Committee, introduced a resolution that asked the Taft administration to begin talks with Britain on how the United States might best annex Canada. Taft rejected the proposal and asked the committee to take a vote on the resolution, which only Bennett supported, but the Conservatives now had more ammunition. Since Bennett, a strong protectionist, had been an opponent of the reciprocity agreement, the Canadian historian Chantal Allen suggested that Bennett had introduced his resolution deliberately to inflame Canadian opinion against the reciprocity agreement. Clark's speech had already provoked massive outrage in Canada. Bennett's resolution was taken by many Canadians as more proof that the Conservatives were right that the reciprocity agreement would result in the US annexing Canada.

The Washington Post noted that the effect of Clark's speech and Bennett's resolution in Canada had "roused the opponents of reciprocity in and out of Parliament to the highest pitch of excitement they have yet reached". English Canada's most widely read newspaper, The Montreal Daily Star, which had originally supported the Liberals and reciprocity, now did a volte-face and turned against the reciprocity agreement. In an editorial, it wrote, "None of us realized the inward meaning of the shrewdly framed offer of the long headed American government when we first saw it. It was as cunning a trap as ever laid. The master bargainers of Washington have not lost their skill."

=== Anti-Americanism ===
Contemporary accounts mentioned in the aftermath of Clark's speech that anti-Americanism was at an all-time high in Canada. Many American newspapers advised their readers that if they visited Canada, they should not identify themselves as American, or they could become the objects of abuse and hatred from the Canadians. The New York Times, in a July 1911 report stated that Laurier was "having the fight of his career to carry reciprocity at all". One Conservative MP compared the relationship of Finance Minister William Stevens Fielding and Taft to Samson and Delilah, with Fielding having "succumbed to the Presidential blandishments."

When the reciprocity agreement was submitted by Laurier to the House of Commons for ratification by Parliament, the Conservatives waged a vigorous filibuster against the reciprocity agreement on the floor of the House. Although the Liberals still had two years left in their mandate, they decided to call an election to settle the issue after it had aroused controversy, and Laurier was unable to break the filibuster.

Borden largely ran on a platform of opposing the reciprocity agreement under the grounds that it would "Americanize" Canada and claimed that there was a secret plan on the part of the Taft administration to annex Canada, with the reciprocity agreement being only the first step. In his first speech given in London, Borden declared, "It is beyond doubt that the leading public men of the United States, its leading press, and the mass of its people believe annexation of the Dominion to be the ultimate, inevitable, and desirable result of this proposition, and for that reason support it."

To support his claims, the Conservatives produced thousands of pamphlets reproducing the speeches of Clark and Bennett, which encouraged a massive burst of anti-Americanism that was sweeping across English Canada in 1911.

One American newspaper wrote that the Conservatives were portraying the Americans as "a corrupt, bragging, boodle-hunting and negro lynching crowd from which Canadian workingmen and the Canadian land of milk and honey must be saved." On 7 September 1911, the Montreal Star published a front-page appeal to all Canadians by the popular British poet Rudyard Kipling, who had been asked by his friend, Max Aitken, to write something for the Conservatives. Kipling wrote in his appeal to Canadians, "It is her own soul that Canada risks today. Once that soul is pawned for any consideration, Canada must inevitably conform to the commercial, legal, financial, social and ethical standards which will be imposed on her by the sheer admitted weight of the United States." Kipling's appeal attracted much media attention in English Canada and was reprinted over the next week, in every English newspaper in Canada.

== Immigration ==
In British Columbia, the Conservative Party ran on the slogan "A White Canada" by playing to the fears of British Columbians who resented the increasing presence of cheap Asian labour and the resulting depression in wages.

== Results ==
The campaign went badly for the Liberals, however. The powerful manufacturing interests of Toronto and Montreal switched their allegiance and financing to the Conservatives, who argued that free trade would undermine Canadian sovereignty and lead to a slow annexation of Canada by the US. In an editorial after Borden's victory, the Los Angeles Times wrote: "Their ballots have consigned to everlasting flames the bogy of annexation by the United States which Champ Clark called from the deeps. It was not really a wraith of anything that existed on this side of the line. It was a pumpkin scarehead with blazing eyes, a crooked slit for a nose, and a hideous grinning mouth which the fun-loving Champ placed upon a pole along with the Stars and Stripes, the while he carried terror to loyal Canuck hearts by his derisive shout of annexation."

Dow Grass of Deer Island was arrested for tampering with ballot boxes leading to the Sunbury—Queen's riding's invalidation of results.

The election is often compared to the 1988 federal election, which was also fought over free trade, but the positions of the two parties were now reversed, with the Liberals against the Conservatives' trade proposals.

The Conservatives dominated in Ontario, British Columbia and Manitoba. They also made significant gains in Quebec and Atlantic Canada, although the Liberals still won pluralities in both regions. The Liberals continued to dominate in Alberta and Saskatchewan, where free trade was extremely popular. Notably, this remains the most recent federal election where the Liberals would win the most seats in Alberta (although most Albertan Liberals supported the Borden-led Unionist government during the First World War).

=== National results ===

Party	Party leader	# of candidates	Seats			Popular vote		
Party	Party leader	# of candidates	1908	Elected	Change	#	%	Change
Conservative ^{1}	Robert Borden	208	82	131	+59.8%	625,697	48.03%	+3.08pp
Liberal-Conservative	Robert Borden	2	3	1	-66.7%	6,842	0.53%	-0.74pp
Liberal ^{2}	Wilfrid Laurier	214	133	85	-36.1%	596,871	45.82%	-3.05pp
Independent Conservative		3	-	3		12,499	0.96%	+0.50pp
Labour		3	1	1	-	12,101	0.93%	+0.04pp
Unknown		10	-	-	-	25,857	1.98%	+0.83pp
Independent		12	1	-	-100%	10,346	0.79%	-0.65pp
Socialist		6	-	-	-	4,574	0.35%	-0.17pp
Nationalist Conservative ^{3}		2	*	-	*	4,399	0.34%	*
Nationalist		1	*	-	*	3,533	0.27%	*
Total		461	220	221	+0.5%	1,302,719	100%	
Sources: http://www.elections.ca -- History of Federal Ridings since 1867

Notes:

* Party did not nominate candidates in the previous election.

^{1} One Conservative candidate was acclaimed in Ontario.

^{2} One Liberal candidate was acclaimed in Ontario, and two Liberals were acclaimed in Quebec.

=== Results by province ===
Party name		BC	AB	SK	MB	ON	QC	NB	NS	PE	YK	Total
Conservative	Seats:	7	1	1	8	71	26	5	9	2	1	131
Conservative	Popular vote (%):	58.7	38.5	39.0	51.9	53.5	44.1	43.6	44.5	51.1	60.8	48.0
Liberal	Seats:	-	6	9	2	13	36	8	9	2	-	85
Liberal	Vote (%):	37.7	53.3	59.4	44.8	41.2	44.6	47.7	55.2	48.9	39.2	45.8
Independent Conservative	Seats:					1	2					3
Independent Conservative	Vote (%):					1.5	1.6					1.0
Labour	Seats:					-	1					1
Labour	Vote (%):					0.1	3.6					0.9
Liberal-Conservative	Seats:		-			1						1
Liberal-Conservative	Vote (%):		4.1			0.8						0.5
Total Seats		7	7	10	10	86	65	13	18	4	1	221
Parties that won no seats:
Unknown	Vote (%):		1.0			2.1	2.6	8.7				2.0
Independent	Vote (%):		3.1	1.6	0.3	0.5	1.2		0.3			0.8
Socialist	Vote (%):	3.7			3.0	0.2	0.1					0.4
Nationalist Conservative	Vote (%):					0.3	1.0					0.3
Nationalist	Vote (%):						1.1					0.3

== Detailed analysis ==
=== Synopsis of results ===
1911 Canadian federal election – synopsis of riding results
Electoral district		Winning party							Votes									
Province	Name	1908	1st place	Votes	Share	Margin #	Margin %	2nd place	Con	Lib-Con	Ind-Con	Nat-Con	Lib	Lab	Soc	Nat	Ind	Total
AB	Calgary	Con	Con	7,671	58.15%	2,866	21.73%	Lib	7,671	–	–	–	4,805	–	–	–	716	13,192
AB	Edmonton	Lib	Lib	7,070	56.76%	2,238	17.97%	Con	4,832	–	–	–	7,070	–	–	–	555	12,457
AB	Macleod	Lib-Con	Lib	3,660	49.44%	819	11.06%	Lib-Con	–	2,841	–	–	3,660	–	–	–	902	7,403
AB	Medicine Hat	Con	Lib	6,330	56.49%	1,455	12.99%	Con	4,875	–	–	–	6,330	–	–	–	–	11,205
AB	Red Deer	Lib	Lib	6,711	63.35%	2,829	26.71%	Con	3,882	–	–	–	6,711	–	–	–	–	10,593
AB	Strathcona	Lib	Lib	5,396	65.26%	2,524	30.53%	Con	2,872	–	–	–	5,396	–	–	–	–	8,268
AB	Victoria	Lib	Lib	3,225	48.53%	523	7.87%	Con	2,702	–	–	–	3,225	–	–	–	719	6,646
BC	Comox—Atlin	Lib	Con	1,810	52.74%	188	5.48%	Lib	1,810	–	–	–	1,622	–	–	–	–	3,432
BC	Kootenay	Con	Con	4,113	57.51%	1,074	15.02%	Lib	4,113	–	–	–	3,039	–	–	–	–	7,152
BC	Nanaimo	Lib	Con	2,438	58.21%	688	16.43%	Lib	2,438	–	–	–	1,750	–	–	–	–	4,188
BC	New Westminster	Con	Con	3,542	65.70%	1,693	31.40%	Lib	3,542	–	–	–	1,849	–	–	–	–	5,391
BC	Vancouver City	Con	Con	6,902	58.72%	3,106	26.43%	Lib	6,902	–	–	–	3,796	–	1,056	–	–	11,754
BC	Victoria City	Con	Con	2,816	51.78%	484	8.90%	Lib	2,816	–	–	–	2,332	–	290	–	–	5,438
BC	Yale—Cariboo	Con	Con	3,851	63.56%	1,889	31.18%	Lib	3,851	–	–	–	1,962	–	246	–	–	6,059
MB	Brandon	Lib	Con	4,436	55.41%	866	10.82%	Lib	4,436	–	–	–	3,570	–	–	–	–	8,006
MB	Dauphin	Con	Lib	3,674	55.67%	748	11.33%	Con	2,926	–	–	–	3,674	–	–	–	–	6,600
MB	Lisgar	Con	Con	1,692	50.30%	20	0.59%	Lib	1,692	–	–	–	1,672	–	–	–	–	3,364
MB	Macdonald	Con	Con	2,956	51.40%	161	2.80%	Lib	2,956	–	–	–	2,795	–	–	–	–	5,751
MB	Marquette	Con	Con	3,409	50.94%	126	1.88%	Lib	3,409	–	–	–	3,283	–	–	–	–	6,692
MB	Portage la Prairie	Con	Con	3,267	55.76%	675	11.52%	Lib	3,267	–	–	–	2,592	–	–	–	–	5,859
MB	Provencher	Lib	Lib	3,049	53.33%	381	6.66%	Con	2,668	–	–	–	3,049	–	–	–	–	5,717
MB	Selkirk	Con	Con	3,098	48.84%	87	1.37%	Lib	3,098	–	–	–	3,011	–	–	–	234	6,343
MB	Souris	Con	Con	3,150	50.51%	64	1.03%	Lib	3,150	–	–	–	3,086	–	–	–	–	6,236
MB	Winnipeg	Con	Con	12,754	55.15%	4,705	20.34%	Lib	12,754	–	–	–	8,049	–	2,325	–	–	23,128
NB	Carleton	Lib	Lib	2,614	50.11%	11	0.21%	Con	2,603	–	–	–	2,614	–	–	–	–	5,217
NB	Charlotte	Lib	Con	2,685	51.89%	196	3.79%	Lib	2,685	–	–	–	2,489	–	–	–	–	5,174
NB	Gloucester	Lib	Lib	3,172	59.27%	992	18.54%	Con	2,180	–	–	–	3,172	–	–	–	–	5,352
NB	Kent	Lib	Con	2,334	52.30%	205	4.59%	Lib	2,334	–	–	–	2,129	–	–	–	–	4,463
NB	King's and Albert	Lib	Con	3,734	52.33%	332	4.65%	Lib	3,734	–	–	–	3,402	–	–	–	–	7,136
NB	Northumberland	Lib	Lib	3,128	53.34%	392	6.68%	Con	2,736	–	–	–	3,128	–	–	–	–	5,864
NB	Restigouche	Lib	Lib	1,512	56.38%	342	12.75%	Con	1,170	–	–	–	1,512	–	–	–	–	2,682
NB	City and County of St. John	Lib	Con	5,491	50.51%	110	1.01%	Lib	5,491 (Note: William Pugsley and John Waterhouse Daniel swapped seats.)	–	–	–	5,381	–	–	–	–	10,872
NB	City of St. John	Con	Lib	4,360	50.38%	65	0.75%	Con	4,295	–	–	–	4,360	–	–	–	–	8,655
NB	Sunbury—Queen's	Lib	Lib	2,020	50.12%	10	0.25%	Con	2,010	–	–	–	2,020	–	–	–	–	4,030
NB	Victoria	Lib	Lib	3,059	73.36%	1,948	46.71%	Con	1,111	–	–	–	3,059	–	–	–	–	4,170
NB	Westmorland	Lib	Lib	4,452	50.36%	64	0.72%	Ind	–	–	–	–	4,452	–	–	–	4,388	8,840
NB	York	Con	Con	4,143	62.61%	1,669	25.22%	Ind	4,143	–	–	–	–	–	–	–	2,474	6,617
NS	Annapolis	Lib	Con	2,131	50.15%	13	0.31%	Lib	2,131	–	–	–	2,118	–	–	–	–	4,249
NS	Antigonish	Lib	Lib	1,468	59.80%	481	19.59%	Con	987	–	–	–	1,468	–	–	–	–	2,455
NS	Cape Breton South	Lib-Con	Lib	5,069	49.42%	104	1.01%	Lib	–	–	–	–	10,034 (Note: James William Maddin previously campaigned as a Liberal-Conservative, but lost in 1911 as a Liberal. William F. Carroll was the winning Liberal candidate.)	–	–	–	223	10,257
NS	Colchester	Con	Con	2,847	56.38%	644	12.75%	Lib	2,847	–	–	–	2,203	–	–	–	–	5,050
NS	Cumberland	Con	Con	4,780	51.83%	338	3.67%	Lib	4,780	–	–	–	4,442	–	–	–	–	9,222
NS	Digby	Con	Con	2,126	53.26%	260	6.51%	Lib	2,126	–	–	–	1,866	–	–	–	–	3,992
NS	Guysborough	Lib	Lib	2,043	54.58%	343	9.16%	Con	1,700	–	–	–	2,043	–	–	–	–	3,743
NS	Halifax	Con	Con	13,827	50.00%	2	0.01%	Lib	13,827	–	–	–	13,825	–	–	–	–	27,652
NS	Hants	Lib	Con	2,191	51.00%	86	2.00%	Lib	2,191	–	–	–	2,105	–	–	–	–	4,296
NS	Inverness	Lib	Lib	2,928	58.84%	1,008	20.26%	Con	1,920	–	–	–	2,928	–	–	–	128	4,976
NS	Kings	Lib	Con	2,474	51.57%	151	3.15%	Lib	2,474	–	–	–	2,323	–	–	–	–	4,797
NS	Lunenburg	Lib	Con	3,645	52.96%	408	5.93%	Lib	3,645	–	–	–	3,237	–	–	–	–	6,882
NS	North Cape Breton and Victoria	Lib	Lib	3,418	54.94%	615	9.89%	Con	2,803	–	–	–	3,418	–	–	–	–	6,221
NS	Pictou	Lib	Lib	4,221	51.74%	284	3.48%	Con	3,937	–	–	–	4,221	–	–	–	–	8,158
NS	Richmond	Lib	Lib	1,268	56.33%	285	12.66%	Con	983	–	–	–	1,268	–	–	–	–	2,251
NS	Shelburne and Queen's	Lib	Con	2,678	51.43%	149	2.86%	Lib	2,678	–	–	–	2,529	–	–	–	–	5,207
NS	Yarmouth	Lib	Lib	2,399	66.38%	1,184	32.76%	Con	1,215	–	–	–	2,399	–	–	–	–	3,614
ON	Algoma East	Con	Con	3,898	51.20%	182	2.39%	Lib	3,898	–	–	–	3,716	–	–	–	–	7,614
ON	Algoma West	Con	Con	2,738	55.67%	558	11.35%	Lib	2,738	–	–	–	2,180	–	–	–	–	4,918
ON	Brant	Lib	Con	1,795	51.86%	129	3.73%	Lib	1,795	–	–	–	1,666	–	–	–	–	3,461
ON	Brantford	Lib	Con	3,159	56.42%	719	12.84%	Lib	3,159	–	–	–	2,440	–	–	–	–	5,599
ON	Brockville	Lib	Con	2,251	51.26%	111	2.53%	Lib	2,251	–	–	–	2,140	–	–	–	–	4,391
ON	Bruce North	Lib	Con	2,526	50.82%	82	1.65%	Lib	2,526	–	–	–	2,444	–	–	–	–	4,970
ON	Bruce South	Con	Con	2,878	50.91%	103	1.82%	Lib	2,878	–	–	–	2,775	–	–	–	–	5,653
ON	Carleton	Con	Con	2,616	66.14%	1,277	32.29%	Lib	2,616	–	–	–	1,339	–	–	–	–	3,955
ON	Dufferin	Con	Con	2,496	70.65%	1,459	41.30%	Lib	2,496	–	–	–	1,037	–	–	–	–	3,533
ON	Dundas	Con	Con	2,262	58.30%	644	16.60%	Lib	2,262	–	–	–	1,618	–	–	–	–	3,880
ON	Durham	Con	Con	3,291	56.18%	724	12.36%	Lib	3,291	–	–	–	2,567	–	–	–	–	5,858
ON	Elgin East	Con	Con	2,313	54.66%	394	9.31%	Lib	2,313	–	–	–	1,919	–	–	–	–	4,232
ON	Elgin West	Con	Con	3,629	57.05%	897	14.10%	Lib	3,629	–	–	–	2,732	–	–	–	–	6,361
ON	Essex North	Lib	Con	3,616	51.25%	176	2.49%	Lib	3,616	–	–	–	3,440	–	–	–	–	7,056
ON	Essex South	Lib	Lib	2,946	51.77%	201	3.53%	Con	2,745	–	–	–	2,946	–	–	–	–	5,691
ON	Frontenac	Con	Con	2,629	59.68%	853	19.36%	Lib	2,629	–	–	–	1,776	–	–	–	–	4,405
ON	Glengarry	Lib	Lib	2,175	52.74%	226	5.48%	Con	1,949	–	–	–	2,175	–	–	–	–	4,124
ON	Grenville	Con	Con	2,286	62.48%	913	24.95%	Ind	2,286	–	–	–	–	–	–	–	1,373 (Note: Samuel John Martin campaigned as a Liberal in 1908.)	3,659
ON	Grey East	Con	Con	2,560	63.44%	1,085	26.89%	Lib	2,560	–	–	–	1,475	–	–	–	–	4,035
ON	Grey North	Con	Con	3,326	52.79%	352	5.59%	Lib	3,326	–	–	–	2,974	–	–	–	–	6,300
ON	Grey South	Lib	Con	2,139	50.57%	48	1.13%	Lib	2,139	–	–	–	2,091	–	–	–	–	4,230
ON	Haldimand	Con	Con	2,817	56.85%	679	13.70%	Lib	2,817	–	–	–	2,138	–	–	–	–	4,955
ON	Halton	Con	Con	2,618	54.35%	419	8.70%	Lib	2,618	–	–	–	2,199	–	–	–	–	4,817
ON	Hamilton East	Con	Con	4,981	67.43%	2,575	34.86%	Lib	4,981	–	–	–	2,406	–	–	–	–	7,387
ON	Hamilton West	Con	Con	4,390	58.67%	1,820	24.33%	Lib	4,390	–	–	–	2,570	–	–	–	522	7,482
ON	Hastings East	Con	Con	2,899	61.26%	1,066	22.53%	Lib	2,899	–	–	–	1,833	–	–	–	–	4,732
ON	Hastings West	Con	Con	3,623	66.17%	1,771	32.35%	Lib	3,623	–	–	–	1,852	–	–	–	–	5,475
ON	Huron East	Con	Con	2,020	52.58%	198	5.15%	Lib	2,020	–	–	–	1,822	–	–	–	–	3,842
ON	Huron South	Lib	Con	2,360	51.24%	114	2.48%	Lib	2,360	–	–	–	2,246	–	–	–	–	4,606
ON	Huron West	Con	Con	2,024	52.26%	175	4.52%	Lib	2,024	–	–	–	1,849	–	–	–	–	3,873
ON	Kent East	Lib	Lib	2,604	52.87%	283	5.75%	Con	2,321	–	–	–	2,604	–	–	–	–	4,925
ON	Kent West	Lib	Lib	3,671	50.45%	66	0.91%	Con	3,605	–	–	–	3,671	–	–	–	–	7,276
ON	Kingston	Lib	Con	2,322	54.01%	345	8.03%	Lib	2,322	–	–	–	1,977	–	–	–	–	4,299
ON	Lambton East	Con	Con	2,720	54.99%	494	9.99%	Lib	2,720	–	–	–	2,226	–	–	–	–	4,946
ON	Lambton West	Lib	Lib	3,139	50.72%	89	1.44%	Con	3,050	–	–	–	3,139	–	–	–	–	6,189
ON	Lanark North	Con	Con	1,613	53.78%	227	7.57%	Lib	1,613	–	–	–	1,386	–	–	–	–	2,999
ON	Lanark South	Con	Con	2,234	67.68%	1,167	35.35%	Lib	2,234	–	–	–	1,067	–	–	–	–	3,301
ON	Leeds	Con	Con	2,392	62.23%	940	24.45%	Lib	2,392	–	–	–	1,452	–	–	–	–	3,844
ON	Lennox and Addington	Con	Con	2,580	56.41%	586	12.81%	Lib	2,580	–	–	–	1,994	–	–	–	–	4,574
ON	Lincoln	Con	Con	4,576	60.22%	1,553	20.44%	Lib	4,576	–	–	–	3,023	–	–	–	–	7,599
ON	London	Con	Con	5,263	61.09%	1,911	22.18%	Ind	5,263	–	–	–	–	–	–	–	3,352	8,615
ON	Middlesex East	Con	Con	2,477	57.70%	661	15.40%	Lib	2,477	–	–	–	1,816	–	–	–	–	4,293
ON	Middlesex North	Lib	Con	1,768	50.76%	53	1.52%	Lib	1,768	–	–	–	1,715	–	–	–	–	3,483
ON	Middlesex West	Lib	Lib	1,883	51.80%	131	3.60%	Con	1,752	–	–	–	1,883	–	–	–	–	3,635
ON	Muskoka	Con	Con	2,282	64.39%	1,020	28.78%	Lib	2,282	–	–	–	1,262	–	–	–	–	3,544
ON	Nipissing	Con	Con	5,872	52.43%	545	4.87%	Lib	5,872	–	–	–	5,327	–	–	–	–	11,199
ON	Norfolk	Con	Lib	3,179	50.95%	118	1.89%	Con	3,061	–	–	–	3,179	–	–	–	–	6,240
ON	Northumberland East	Con	Con	2,518	54.21%	391	8.42%	Lib	2,518	–	–	–	2,127	–	–	–	–	4,645
ON	Northumberland West	Lib	Con	1,426	50.11%	6	0.21%	Lib	1,426	–	–	–	1,420	–	–	–	–	2,846
ON	Ontario North	Con	Con	2,130	57.54%	558	15.07%	Lib	2,130	–	–	–	1,572	–	–	–	–	3,702
ON	Ontario South	Lib	Con	2,917	53.39%	370	6.77%	Lib	2,917	–	–	–	2,547	–	–	–	–	5,464
ON	Ottawa (City of)	Lib	Con	13,954	51.38%	1,048	3.86%	Lib	13,954	–	–	–	12,906	–	298	–	–	27,158
ON	Oxford North	Lib	Lib	2,898	52.68%	295	5.36%	Con	2,603	–	–	–	2,898	–	–	–	–	5,501
ON	Oxford South	Lib	Con	2,503	50.24%	24	0.48%	Lib	2,503	–	–	–	2,479	–	–	–	–	4,982
ON	Parry Sound	Con	Con	2,976	60.81%	1,058	21.62%	Lib	2,976	–	–	–	1,918	–	–	–	–	4,894
ON	Peel	Con	Con	2,656	53.16%	316	6.33%	Lib	2,656	–	–	–	2,340	–	–	–	–	4,996
ON	Perth North	Lib	Con	3,741	53.56%	497	7.12%	Lib	3,741	–	–	–	3,244	–	–	–	–	6,985
ON	Perth South	Lib	Con	2,303	50.91%	82	1.81%	Lib	2,303	–	–	–	2,221	–	–	–	–	4,524
ON	Peterborough East	Con	Con	1,992	58.74%	593	17.49%	Lib	1,992	–	–	–	1,399	–	–	–	–	3,391
ON	Peterborough West	Lib	Con	2,944	50.36%	42	0.72%	Lib	2,944	–	–	–	2,902	–	–	–	–	5,846
ON	Prescott	Lib	Lib	2,532	67.48%	1,312	34.97%	Nat-Con	–	–	–	1,220 (Note: Eugène-Grégoire Quesnel campaigned as an Independent in 1908.)	2,532	–	–	–	–	3,752
ON	Prince Edward	Lib	Con	2,304	53.23%	280	6.47%	Lib	2,304	–	–	–	2,024	–	–	–	–	4,328
ON	Renfrew North	Con	Con	2,573	57.98%	708	15.95%	Lib	2,573	–	–	–	1,865	–	–	–	–	4,438
ON	Renfrew South	Lib	Lib	2,687	56.51%	619	13.02%	Con	2,068	–	–	–	2,687	–	–	–	–	4,755
ON	Russell	Lib	Lib	3,812	57.34%	976	14.68%	Con	2,836	–	–	–	3,812	–	–	–	–	6,648
ON	Simcoe East	Lib	Con	3,315	53.78%	466	7.56%	Lib	3,315	–	–	–	2,849	–	–	–	–	6,164
ON	Simcoe North	Con	Con	2,648	51.68%	172	3.36%	Lib	2,648	–	–	–	2,476	–	–	–	–	5,124
ON	Simcoe South	Con	Con	3,278	66.71%	1,642	33.41%	Lib	3,278	–	–	–	1,636	–	–	–	–	4,914
ON	Stormont	Lib	Con	2,539	51.32%	131	2.65%	Lib	2,539	–	–	–	2,408	–	–	–	–	4,947
ON	Thunder Bay and Rainy River (Note: Election had been postponed to October 12.)	Lib	Con	acclaimed														
ON	Toronto Centre	Con	Con	5,156	63.26%	2,162	26.53%	Lib	5,156	–	–	–	2,994	–	–	–	–	8,150
ON	Toronto East	Ind	Con	7,082	60.51%	4,801	41.02%	Ind	7,082	–	–	–	1,878	463	–	–	2,281	11,704
ON	Toronto North	Con	Con	6,474	67.22%	3,317	34.44%	Lib	6,474	–	–	–	3,157	–	–	–	–	9,631
ON	Toronto South	Con	Con	4,473	67.95%	2,363	35.90%	Lib	4,473	–	–	–	2,110	–	–	–	–	6,583
ON	Toronto West	Con	Con	11,442	76.90%	8,005	53.80%	Lib	11,442	–	–	–	3,437	–	–	–	–	14,879
ON	Victoria	Lib-Con	Lib-Con	4,001	59.65%	1,294	19.29%	Ind	–	4,001	–	–	–	–	–	–	2,707	6,708
ON	Waterloo North	Lib	Con	3,774	52.18%	315	4.36%	Lib	3,774	–	–	–	3,459	–	–	–	–	7,233
ON	Waterloo South	Con	Con	3,492	56.96%	853	13.91%	Lib	3,492	–	–	–	2,639	–	–	–	–	6,131
ON	Welland	Lib	Lib	acclaimed														
ON	Wellington North	Lib	Con	2,530	50.25%	25	0.50%	Lib	2,530	–	–	–	2,505	–	–	–	–	5,035
ON	Wellington South	Lib	Lib	3,368	55.10%	624	10.21%	Con	2,744	–	–	–	3,368	–	–	–	–	6,112
ON	Wentworth	Lib	Con	3,832	56.59%	893	13.19%	Lib	3,832	–	–	–	2,939	–	–	–	–	6,771
ON	York Centre	Con	Con	2,838	54.94%	510	9.87%	Lib	2,838	–	–	–	2,328	–	–	–	–	5,166
ON	York North	Lib	Con	2,730	50.55%	59	1.09%	Lib	2,730	–	–	–	2,671	–	–	–	–	5,401
ON	York South	Ind-Con	Ind-Con	7,194	79.10%	5,293	58.20%	Ind	–	–	7,194	–	–	–	–	–	1,901	9,095
PE	King's	Con	Lib	2,538	50.14%	14	0.28%	Con	2,524	–	–	–	2,538	–	–	–	–	5,062
PE	Prince	Lib	Lib	3,529	50.83%	115	1.66%	Con	3,414	–	–	–	3,529	–	–	–	–	6,943
PE	Queen's	Lib	Con	8,700	52.31%	769	4.62%	Lib	8,700	–	–	–	7,931	–	–	–	–	16,631
QC	Argenteuil	Con	Con	1,824	59.78%	597	19.57%	Lib	1,824	–	–	–	1,227	–	–	–	–	3,051
QC	Bagot	Lib	Lib	1,845	51.32%	95	2.64%	Con	1,750	–	–	–	1,845	–	–	–	–	3,595
QC	Beauce	Lib	Lib	4,823	58.23%	1,364	16.47%	Con	3,459	–	–	–	4,823 (Note: Henri Sévérin Béland, incumbent in Beauce, campaigned in both Beauce (won) and Montmagny (lost).)	–	–	–	–	8,282
QC	Beauharnois	Lib	Con	1,876	50.36%	27	0.72%	Con	3,725 (Note: Louis-Joseph Papineau, previously elected as a Liberal in 1908, was reelected as a Conservative in 1911. The other Conservative candidate, Joseph-Gédéon-Horace Bergeron, had been previously elected to the House of Commons.)	–	–	–	–	–	–	–	–	3,725
QC	Bellechasse	Lib	Con	1,742	50.67%	46	1.34%	Lib	1,742	–	–	–	1,696	–	–	–	–	3,438
QC	Berthier	Lib	Con	1,638	45.09%	26	0.72%	Lib	1,638	–	–	–	1,612	–	–	–	383	3,633
QC	Bonaventure	Lib	Lib	2,444	63.66%	1,049	27.32%	Con	1,395	–	–	–	2,444	–	–	–	–	3,839
QC	Brome	Lib	Con	1,520	50.40%	24	0.80%	Lib	1,520	–	–	–	1,496	–	–	–	–	3,016
QC	Chambly—Verchères	Lib	Con	2,712	51.29%	136	2.57%	Lib	2,712	–	–	–	2,576	–	–	–	–	5,288
QC	Champlain	Con	Con	3,811	52.53%	367	5.06%	Lib	3,811	–	–	–	3,444	–	–	–	–	7,255
QC	Charlevoix	Con	Con	2,020	59.80%	662	19.60%	Lib	2,020 (Note: Rodolphe Forget, incumbent in Charlevoix, campaigned and won in both Charlevoix and Montmorency.)	–	–	–	1,358	–	–	–	–	3,378
QC	Châteauguay	Lib	Lib	1,281	50.79%	40	1.59%	Con	1,241	–	–	–	1,281	–	–	–	–	2,522
QC	Chicoutimi—Saguenay	Con	Ind-Con	3,798	38.59%	1,275	12.96%	Lib	–	–	3,798	–	2,523	–	–	–	3,520	9,841
QC	Compton	Lib	Con	2,953	50.65%	76	1.30%	Lib	2,953	–	–	–	2,877	–	–	–	–	5,830
QC	Dorchester	Lib	Con	2,506	53.66%	342	7.32%	Lib	2,506	–	–	–	2,164	–	–	–	–	4,670
QC	Drummond—Arthabaska	Lib	Lib	3,800	51.82%	267	3.64%	Nat	–	–	–	–	3,800	–	–	3,533	–	7,333
QC	Gaspé	Lib	Con	2,470	56.52%	570	13.04%	Lib	2,470	–	–	–	1,900 (Note: Rodolphe Lemieux, incumbent in Gaspé, campaigned in Gaspé (lost) and Rouville (won).)	–	–	–	–	4,370
QC	Hochelaga	Lib	Con	7,178	55.29%	1,373	10.58%	Ind	7,178	–	–	–	–	–	–	–	5,805	12,983
QC	Huntingdon	Lib	Lib	1,318	52.93%	146	5.86%	Con	1,172	–	–	–	1,318	–	–	–	–	2,490
QC	Jacques Cartier	Con	Con	5,782	56.55%	1,340	13.11%	Lib	5,782	–	–	–	4,442	–	–	–	–	10,224
QC	Joliette	Lib	Con	2,239	50.75%	66	1.50%	Lib	2,239	–	–	–	2,173	–	–	–	–	4,412
QC	Kamouraska	Lib	Lib	1,840	51.20%	86	2.39%	Con	1,754	–	–	–	1,840	–	–	–	–	3,594
QC	L'Assomption	Lib	Lib	1,508	55.50%	299	11.00%	Con	1,209	–	–	–	1,508	–	–	–	–	2,717
QC	L'Islet	Con	Con	1,578	57.97%	434	15.94%	Lib	1,578	–	–	–	1,144	–	–	–	–	2,722
QC	Labelle	Lib	Con	2,902	50.73%	84	1.47%	Lib	2,902	–	–	–	2,818	–	–	–	–	5,720
QC	Laprairie—Napierville	Lib	Lib	1,795	52.47%	169	4.94%	Con	1,626	–	–	–	1,795	–	–	–	–	3,421
QC	Laval	Lib	Lib	2,648	51.95%	199	3.90%	Con	2,449	–	–	–	2,648	–	–	–	–	5,097
QC	Lévis	Lib	Lib	2,800	58.69%	829	17.38%	Con	1,971	–	–	–	2,800	–	–	–	–	4,771
QC	Lotbinière	Lib	Lib	1,870	55.16%	350	10.32%	Con	1,520	–	–	–	1,870	–	–	–	–	3,390
QC	Maisonneuve	Labour	Labour	11,538	55.24%	2,189	10.48%	Con	9,349	–	–	–	–	11,538	–	–	–	20,887
QC	Maskinongé	Lib	Ind-Con	1,507	51.88%	109	3.75%	Lib	–	–	1,507	–	1,398	–	–	–	–	2,905
QC	Mégantic	Lib	Lib	2,986	53.27%	367	6.55%	Ind	–	–	–	–	2,986	–	–	–	2,619	5,605
QC	Missisquoi	Lib	Lib	2,002	52.66%	202	5.31%	Con	1,800	–	–	–	2,002	–	–	–	–	3,802
QC	Montcalm	Lib	Lib	1,432	51.03%	58	2.07%	Con	1,374	–	–	–	1,432 (Note: David Arthur Lafortune was originally elected as an Independent Liberal in a 1909 byelection.)	–	–	–	–	2,806
QC	Montmagny	Lib	Con	1,653	55.45%	325	10.90%	Lib	1,653	–	–	–	1,328	–	–	–	–	2,981
QC	Montmorency	Lib	Con	1,359	51.26%	67	2.53%	Lib	1,359	–	–	–	1,292	–	–	–	–	2,651
QC	Nicolet	Lib	Con	2,805	50.76%	84	1.52%	Lib	2,805	–	–	–	2,721	–	–	–	–	5,526
QC	Pontiac	Lib	Con	2,059	44.59%	666	14.42%	Lib	2,059	–	–	–	2,559 (Note: George Frederick Hodgins, the Liberal incumbent, came in at 3rd place.)	–	–	–	–	4,618
QC	Portneuf	Lib	Lib	2,868	57.67%	763	15.34%	Con	2,105	–	–	–	2,868	–	–	–	–	4,973
QC	Quebec County	Lib	Con	2,295	50.53%	48	1.06%	Lib	2,295	–	–	–	2,247	–	–	–	–	4,542
QC	Quebec East	Lib	Lib	acclaimed														
QC	Quebec West	Con	Lib	1,219	51.94%	91	3.88%	Con	1,128	–	–	–	1,219	–	–	–	–	2,347
QC	Quebec-Centre	Lib	Lib	2,122	58.12%	593	16.24%	Con	1,529	–	–	–	2,122	–	–	–	–	3,651
QC	Richelieu	Lib	Lib	2,373	59.15%	734	18.30%	Con	1,639	–	–	–	2,373	–	–	–	–	4,012
QC	Richmond—Wolfe	Lib	Lib	3,855	53.80%	544	7.59%	Con	3,311	–	–	–	3,855	–	–	–	–	7,166
QC	Rimouski	Lib	Con	4,179	52.73%	432	5.45%	Lib	4,179	–	–	–	3,747	–	–	–	–	7,926
QC	Rouville	Lib	Lib	1,467	55.23%	278	10.47%	Con	1,189	–	–	–	1,467	–	–	–	–	2,656
QC	Shefford	Lib	Lib	2,271	50.29%	26	0.58%	Con	2,245	–	–	–	2,271	–	–	–	–	4,516
QC	Town of Sherbrooke	Con	Lib	2,321	50.42%	39	0.85%	Con	2,282	–	–	–	2,321	–	–	–	–	4,603
QC	Soulanges	Con	Lib	1,045	53.64%	142	7.29%	Con	903	–	–	–	1,045 (Note: Wilfrid Laurier was also acclaimed in Quebec East.)	–	–	–	–	1,948
QC	St. Anne	Con	Con	3,319	56.40%	753	12.80%	Lib	3,319	–	–	–	2,566	–	–	–	–	5,885
QC	St. Antoine	Con	Con	4,677	63.68%	2,009	27.35%	Lib	4,677	–	–	–	2,668	–	–	–	–	7,345
QC	St. Hyacinthe	Lib	Lib	2,295	51.57%	140	3.15%	Con	2,155	–	–	–	2,295	–	–	–	–	4,450
QC	St. James	Lib	Lib	4,653	59.41%	1,474	18.82%	Nat-Con	–	–	–	3,179	4,653	–	–	–	–	7,832
QC	St. Johns—Iberville	Lib	Lib	2,638	78.35%	1,909	56.70%	Con	729	–	–	–	2,638	–	–	–	–	3,367
QC	St. Lawrence	Lib	Lib	4,469	54.18%	1,048	12.70%	Con	3,421	–	–	–	4,469	–	359	–	–	8,249
QC	St. Mary	Lib	Lib	5,089	62.82%	2,177	26.87%	Con	2,912	–	–	–	5,089	100	–	–	–	8,101
QC	Stanstead	Lib	Lib	2,310	52.31%	204	4.62%	Con	2,106	–	–	–	2,310	–	–	–	–	4,416
QC	Témiscouata	Lib	Lib	2,913	51.89%	212	3.78%	Con	2,701	–	–	–	2,913	–	–	–	–	5,614
QC	Terrebonne	Con	Con	2,727	56.48%	626	12.97%	Lib	2,727	–	–	–	2,101	–	–	–	–	4,828
QC	Three Rivers and St. Maurice	Lib	Lib	3,155	50.07%	9	0.14%	Con	3,146	–	–	–	3,155	–	–	–	–	6,301
QC	Two Mountains	Lib	Lib	acclaimed														
QC	Vaudreuil	Lib	Lib	1,345	54.34%	215	8.69%	Con	1,130	–	–	–	1,345	–	–	–	–	2,475
QC	Wright	Lib	Lib	4,003	58.68%	1,184	17.36%	Con	2,819	–	–	–	4,003	–	–	–	–	6,822
QC	Yamaska	Lib	Con	1,870	51.28%	93	2.55%	Lib	1,870	–	–	–	1,777	–	–	–	–	3,647
SK	Assiniboia	Lib	Lib	5,804	61.86%	2,226	23.73%	Con	3,578	–	–	–	5,804	–	–	–	–	9,382
SK	Battleford	Lib	Lib	5,453	60.76%	1,931	21.52%	Con	3,522	–	–	–	5,453	–	–	–	–	8,975
SK	Humboldt	Lib	Lib	7,265	71.14%	4,318	42.28%	Con	2,947	–	–	–	7,265	–	–	–	–	10,212
SK	Mackenzie	Lib	Lib	4,090	70.17%	2,351	40.33%	Con	1,739	–	–	–	4,090	–	–	–	–	5,829
SK	Moose Jaw	Lib	Lib	8,285	58.19%	2,332	16.38%	Con	5,953	–	–	–	8,285	–	–	–	–	14,238
SK	Prince Albert	Lib	Con	3,316	52.83%	355	5.66%	Lib	3,316	–	–	–	2,961	–	–	–	–	6,277
SK	Qu'Appelle	Con	Lib	4,298	52.59%	424	5.19%	Con	3,874	–	–	–	4,298	–	–	–	–	8,172
SK	Regina	Lib	Lib	5,811	54.63%	1,730	16.26%	Con	4,081	–	–	–	5,811	–	–	–	745	10,637
SK	Saltcoats	Lib	Lib	3,619	65.17%	1,685	30.34%	Con	1,934	–	–	–	3,619	–	–	–	–	5,553
SK	Saskatoon	Lib	Lib	5,328	54.70%	1,572	16.14%	Con	3,756	–	–	–	5,328	–	–	–	656	9,740
Terr	Yukon	Lib	Con	1,285	60.79%	456	21.57%	Lib	1,285	–	–	–	829	–	–	–	–	2,114

= open seat
= winning candidate was in previous House
= not incumbent; was previously elected as an MP
= incumbent had switched allegiance
= incumbency arose from byelection gain
= previously incumbent in another riding
= other incumbents renominated
= campaigned in two ridings
= Previously a member of one of the provincial/territorial legislatures
= multiple candidates
= two-member districts
= overlapping districts
= election postponed to a later date

Results - multiple-member ridings
Name	MPs	1908	1911	Notes
Halifax	2	2	1 1	Robert Borden reelected; Alexander Kenneth Maclean won a seat for the Liberals.
Ottawa (City of)	2	2	2	Harold McGiverin defeated; Albert Allard chose not to stand for reelection.
Queen's	2	2	2	Both incumbents defeated.

=== Comparative analysis for ridings (1911 vs 1908) ===
Summary of riding results by vote share for winning candidate and swing (vs 1908)
Riding and winning party				Vote share (Note: Share won by winning candidate, with difference noted from share achieved by the same party in 1908.)		Swing (Note: Positive indicates improvement to standing of party winning in 1908; negative points to 2020's second-place party being swung to.)	
Riding and winning party				%	Change (pp)	To	Change (pp)
AB	Calgary	Con	Hold	58.15	8.49	Con	6.71
AB	Edmonton	Lib	Hold	56.76	-7.53	Con	-5.31
AB	Macleod	Lib	Gain	49.44	7.09	Lib	-7.88
AB	Medicine Hat	Lib	Gain	56.49	9.70	Lib	-9.70
AB	Red Deer	Lib	Hold	63.35	11.41	Lib	11.41
AB	Strathcona	Lib	Hold	65.26	15.12	Lib	6.84
AB	Victoria	Lib	Hold	48.53	-5.23	Lib	0.18
BC	Comox—Atlin	Con	Gain	52.74	acclamation in 1908		
BC	Kootenay	Con	Hold	57.51	10.54	Con	0.44
BC	Nanaimo	Con	Gain	58.21	25.98	Con	-10.13
BC	New Westminster	Con	Hold	65.70	7.21	Con	7.21
BC	Vancouver City	Con	Hold	58.72	16.61	Con	6.00
BC	Victoria City	Con	Hold	51.78	1.63	Con	4.30
BC	Yale—Cariboo	Con	Hold	63.56	10.42	Con	8.64
MB	Brandon	Con	Gain	55.41	6.59	Con	-5.89
MB	Dauphin	Lib	Gain	55.67	7.42	Lib	-7.42
MB	Lisgar	Con	Hold	50.30	-1.24	Lib	-1.24
MB	Macdonald	Con	Hold	51.40	-3.93	Lib	-3.93
MB	Marquette	Con	Hold	50.94	-3.81	Lib	-3.81
MB	Portage la Prairie	Con	Hold	55.76	3.69	Con	3.69
MB	Provencher	Lib	Hold	53.33	-1.29	Con	-1.29
MB	Selkirk	Con	Hold	48.84	-2.03	Lib	-0.18
MB	Souris	Con	Hold	50.51	-7.16	Lib	-7.16
MB	Winnipeg	Con	Hold	55.15	5.03	Con	4.39
NB	Carleton	Lib	Hold	50.11	-1.37	Con	-1.37
NB	Charlotte	Con	Gain	51.89	3.82	Con	-3.82
NB	Gloucester	Lib	Hold	59.27	4.06	Lib	4.06
NB	Kent	Con	Gain	52.30	10.40	Con	-10.40
NB	King's and Albert	Con	Gain	52.33	4.93	Con	-4.93
NB	Northumberland	Lib	Hold	53.34	-5.63	Con	-5.63
NB	Restigouche	Lib	Hold	56.38	3.58	Lib	3.58
NB	City and County of St. John	Con	Gain	50.51	2.83	Con	-2.83
NB	City of St. John	Lib	Gain	50.38	1.49	Lib	-1.49
NB	Sunbury—Queen's	Lib	Hold	50.12	-0.55	Con	-0.55
NB	Victoria	Lib	Hold	73.36	-4.84	Lib	7.38
NB	Westmorland	Lib	Hold	50.36	-7.59	N/A (Note: 2nd place finisher in 1908 did not contest the 1911 election.)	
NB	York	Con	Hold	62.61	5.86	N/A	
NS	Annapolis	Con	Gain	50.15	2.77	Con	-2.77
NS	Antigonish	Lib	Hold	59.80	9.41	Lib	9.41
NS	Cape Breton South	Lib	Gain	49.42	0.56	Lib	-1.65
NS	Colchester	Con	Hold	56.38	5.30	Con	5.30
NS	Cumberland	Con	Hold	51.83	-0.86	Lib	-0.86
NS	Digby	Con	Hold	53.26	1.34	Con	1.34
NS	Guysborough	Lib	Hold	54.58	1.88	Lib	1.88
NS	Halifax	Con	Hold	50.00	-2.61	Lib	-2.61
NS	Hants	Con	Gain	51.00	2.60	Con	-2.60
NS	Inverness	Lib	Hold	58.84	-5.95	Con	-4.67
NS	Kings	Con	Gain	51.57	7.06	Con	-7.06
NS	Lunenburg	Con	Gain	52.96	4.43	Con	-4.43
NS	North Cape Breton and Victoria	Lib	Hold	54.94	4.79	Lib	4.79
NS	Pictou	Lib	Hold	51.74	-0.04	Con	-0.04
NS	Richmond	Lib	Hold	56.33	1.15	Lib	1.15
NS	Shelburne and Queen's	Con	Gain	51.43	5.12	Con	-5.12
NS	Yarmouth	Lib	Hold	66.38	5.14	Lib	5.14
ON	Algoma East	Con	Hold	51.20	0.83	Con	0.83
ON	Algoma West	Con	Hold	55.67	3.03	Con	3.03
ON	Brant	Con	Gain	51.86	5.52	Con	-5.52
ON	Brantford	Con	Gain	56.42	8.30	Con	-8.30
ON	Brockville	Con	Gain	51.26	3.00	Con	-3.00
ON	Bruce North	Con	Gain	50.82	N/A (Note: Winning party did not field a candidate inn 1908.)	Con	-4.08
ON	Bruce South	Con	Hold	50.91	-0.75	Lib	-0.75
ON	Carleton	Con	Hold	66.14	-1.14	Con	6.77
ON	Dufferin	Con	Hold	70.65	-3.11	Lib	-3.11
ON	Dundas	Con	Hold	58.30	2.76	Con	2.76
ON	Durham	Con	Hold	56.18	1.12	Con	1.12
ON	Elgin East	Con	Hold	54.66	1.77	Con	1.77
ON	Elgin West	Con	Hold	57.05	2.73	Con	2.73
ON	Essex North	Con	Gain	51.25	5.84	Con	-5.84
ON	Essex South	Lib	Hold	51.77	-4.31	Con	-4.31
ON	Frontenac	Con	Hold	59.68	4.47	N/A	
ON	Glengarry	Lib	Hold	52.74	-1.05	Con	-1.05
ON	Grenville	Con	Hold	62.48	4.78	Con	4.78
ON	Grey East	Con	Hold	63.44	-2.09	Lib	-2.09
ON	Grey North	Con	Hold	52.79	1.51	Con	1.51
ON	Grey South	Con	Gain	50.57	1.55	Con	-1.55
ON	Haldimand	Con	Hold	56.85	4.41	Con	4.41
ON	Halton	Con	Hold	54.35	2.06	Con	2.06
ON	Hamilton East	Con	Hold	67.43	19.28	Con	8.57
ON	Hamilton West	Con	Hold	58.67	5.56	Con	9.05
ON	Hastings East	Con	Hold	61.26	-4.08	Lib	-4.08
ON	Hastings West	Con	Hold	66.17	5.73	Con	5.73
ON	Huron East	Con	Hold	52.58	1.61	Con	1.61
ON	Huron South	Con	Gain	51.24	2.77	Con	-2.77
ON	Huron West	Con	Hold	52.26	1.52	Con	1.52
ON	Kent East	Lib	Hold	52.87	-1.77	Con	-1.77
ON	Kent West	Lib	Hold	50.45	-0.09	Con	-0.09
ON	Kingston	Con	Gain	54.01	8.27	Con	-8.27
ON	Lambton East	Con	Hold	54.99	0.72	Con	0.72
ON	Lambton West	Lib	Hold	50.72	-0.45	Con	-0.45
ON	Lanark North	Con	Hold	53.78	3.69	Con	3.69
ON	Lanark South	Con	Hold	67.68	6.70	Con	6.70
ON	Leeds	Con	Hold	62.23	0.03	Con	0.03
ON	Lennox and Addington	Con	Hold	56.41	4.78	Con	4.78
ON	Lincoln	Con	Hold	60.22	8.55	Con	8.55
ON	London	Con	Hold	61.09	3.11	Con	3.11
ON	Middlesex East	Con	Hold	57.70	4.93	Con	4.93
ON	Middlesex North	Con	Gain	50.76	1.63	Con	-1.63
ON	Middlesex West	Lib	Hold	51.80	1.64	Lib	1.64
ON	Muskoka	Con	Hold	64.39	4.90	Con	4.90
ON	Nipissing	Con	Hold	52.43	2.31	Con	2.31
ON	Norfolk	Lib	Gain	50.95	4.23	Lib	-4.23
ON	Northumberland East	Con	Hold	54.21	2.12	Con	2.12
ON	Northumberland West	Con	Gain	50.11	2.47	Con	-2.47
ON	Ontario North	Con	Hold	57.54	5.16	Con	5.16
ON	Ontario South	Con	Gain	53.39	5.54	Con	-5.54
ON	Ottawa (City of)	Con	Gain	51.38	3.64	Con	-4.19
ON	Oxford North	Lib	Hold	52.68	1.49	Lib	1.49
ON	Oxford South	Con	Gain	50.24	1.11	Con	-1.11
ON	Parry Sound	Con	Hold	60.81	2.94	Con	2.94
ON	Peel	Con	Hold	53.16	0.40	Con	0.40
ON	Perth North	Con	Gain	53.56	3.85	Con	-3.85
ON	Perth South	Con	Gain	50.91	1.21	Con	-1.21
ON	Peterborough East	Con	Hold	58.74	3.23	Con	3.23
ON	Peterborough West	Con	Gain	50.36	3.46	Con	-3.46
ON	Prescott	Lib	Hold	67.48	-2.77	Nat-Con	-2.77
ON	Prince Edward	Con	Gain	53.23	4.74	Con	-4.74
ON	Renfrew North	Con	Hold	57.98	1.15	Con	1.15
ON	Renfrew South	Lib	Hold	56.51	-0.75	Con	-0.75
ON	Russell	Lib	Hold	57.34	-2.07	Con	-2.07
ON	Simcoe East	Con	Gain	53.78	5.79	Con	-5.79
ON	Simcoe North	Con	Hold	51.68	1.21	Con	1.21
ON	Simcoe South	Con	Hold	66.71	-1.82	Lib	-1.82
ON	Stormont	Con	Gain	51.32	11.26	Con	-4.77
ON	Thunder Bay and Rainy River	Con	Gain	acclaimed			
ON	Toronto Centre	Con	Hold	63.26	11.88	Con	11.88
ON	Toronto East	Con	Gain	60.51	15.95	Con	-25.95
ON	Toronto North	Con	Hold	67.22	14.91	Con	14.91
ON	Toronto South	Con	Hold	67.95	6.27	N/A	
ON	Toronto West	Con	Hold	76.90	10.54	N/A	
ON	Victoria	Lib-Con	Hold	59.65	2.81	Lib-Con	4.35
ON	Waterloo North	Con	Gain	52.18	4.50	Con	-4.13
ON	Waterloo South	Con	Hold	56.96	5.24	Con	5.24
ON	Welland	Lib	Hold	acclaimed			
ON	Wellington North	Con	Gain	50.25	1.05	Con	-1.05
ON	Wellington South	Lib	Hold	55.10	0.13	Lib	0.13
ON	Wentworth	Con	Gain	56.59	9.35	Con	-9.35
ON	York Centre	Con	Hold	54.94	4.50	Con	4.50
ON	York North	Con	Gain	50.55	3.38	Con	-3.38
ON	York South	Ind-Con	Hold	79.10	acclamation in 1908		
PE	King's	Lib	Gain	50.14	1.90	Lib	-1.90
PE	Prince	Lib	Hold	50.83	-0.36	Con	-0.36
PE	Queen's	Con	Gain	52.31	2.99	Con	-2.99
QC	Argenteuil	Con	Hold	59.78	5.34	Con	5.34
QC	Bagot	Lib	Hold	51.32	-3.53	Con	-3.53
QC	Beauce	Lib	Hold	58.23	-37.47	Con	-37.47
QC	Beauharnois	Con	Gain	50.36	0.76	Con	-25.58
QC	Bellechasse	Con	Gain	50.67	26.69	Con	-26.69
QC	Berthier	Con	Gain	45.09	-1.14	Con	-4.13
QC	Bonaventure	Lib	Hold	63.66	-4.09	Con	-4.09
QC	Brome	Con	Gain	50.40	8.52	Con	-7.89
QC	Chambly—Verchères	Con	Gain	51.29	11.24	Con	-11.24
QC	Champlain	Con	Hold	52.53	1.82	Con	1.82
QC	Charlevoix	Con	Hold	59.80	6.94	Con	6.94
QC	Châteauguay	Lib	Hold	50.79	-5.33	Con	-5.33
QC	Chicoutimi—Saguenay	Ind-Con	Gain	38.59	N/A	Ind	-11.61
QC	Compton	Con	Gain	50.65	3.96	Con	-3.96
QC	Dorchester	Con	Gain	53.66	5.70	Con	-5.70
QC	Drummond—Arthabaska	Lib	Hold	51.82	-4.43	N/A	
QC	Gaspé	Con	Gain	56.52	34.84	Con	-34.84
QC	Hochelaga	Con	Gain	55.29	6.30	Con	-28.66
QC	Huntingdon	Lib	Hold	52.93	1.33	Lib	1.33
QC	Jacques Cartier	Con	Hold	56.55	-0.10	Lib	-0.10
QC	Joliette	Con	Gain	50.75	4.74	Con	-4.74
QC	Kamouraska	Lib	Hold	51.20	-3.41	Con	-3.41
QC	L'Assomption	Lib	Hold	55.50	-6.30	Con	-6.30
QC	L'Islet	Con	Hold	57.97	4.72	Con	4.72
QC	Labelle	Con	Gain	50.73	15.24	Con	-15.24
QC	Laprairie—Napierville	Lib	Hold	52.47	-3.08	Con	-3.08
QC	Laval	Lib	Hold	51.95	1.15	Lib	1.15
QC	Lévis	Lib	Hold	58.69	-4.00	N/A	
QC	Lotbinière	Lib	Hold	55.16	-6.07	Con	-6.07
QC	Maisonneuve	Labour	Hold	55.24	-16.23	N/A	
QC	Maskinongé	Ind-Con	Gain	51.88	N/A (Note: Hormidas Mayrand (Liberal) win in 1908 and lost in 1911 (both were two-way contests). Opponents in each election were of different affiliations.)		
QC	Mégantic	Lib	Hold	53.27	-0.94	N/A	
QC	Missisquoi	Lib	Hold	52.66	3.08	Lib	2.42
QC	Montcalm	Lib	Hold	51.03	-2.24	Con	-2.24
QC	Montmagny	Con	Gain	55.45	8.47	Con	-8.47
QC	Montmorency	Con	Gain	51.26	7.66	Con	-7.66
QC	Nicolet	Con	Gain	50.76	7.74	Con	-7.74
QC	Pontiac	Con	Gain	44.59	3.15	Con	-15.78
QC	Portneuf	Lib	Hold	57.67	0.70	Con	-0.78
QC	Quebec County	Con	Gain	50.53	N/A (Note: Liberal candidate won in 1908 but lost in 1911. There were also two Independent Liberal candidates in 1908, while the Conservatives fielded a candidate only in 1911.)		
QC	Quebec East	Lib	Hold	acclaimed			
QC	Quebec West	Lib	Gain	51.94	2.18	Lib	-2.18
QC	Quebec-Centre	Lib	Hold	58.12	-6.23	Con	-6.23
QC	Richelieu	Lib	Hold	59.15	-3.88	Con	-3.88
QC	Richmond—Wolfe	Lib	Hold	53.80	-2.18	Con	-2.18
QC	Rimouski	Con	Gain	52.73	7.00	Con	-7.00
QC	Rouville	Lib	Hold	55.23	acclamation in 1908		
QC	Shefford	Lib	Hold	50.29	-3.03	Con	-3.03
QC	Town of Sherbrooke	Lib	Gain	50.42	2.18	Lib	-2.18
QC	Soulanges	Lib	Gain	53.64	5.09	Lib	-5.09
QC	St. Anne	Con	Hold	56.40	5.78	Con	5.78
QC	St. Antoine	Con	Hold	63.68	6.74	Con	6.74
QC	St. Hyacinthe	Lib	Hold	51.57	-5.23	Con	-5.23
QC	St. James	Lib	Hold	59.41	-2.40	Nat-Con	-2.40
QC	St. Johns—Iberville	Lib	Hold	78.35	-16.51	Con	-16.51
QC	St. Lawrence	Lib	Hold	54.18	-0.98	Con	-0.24
QC	St. Mary	Lib	Hold	62.82	5.79	Lib	6.40
QC	Stanstead	Lib	Hold	52.31	0.40	Lib	0.40
QC	Témiscouata	Lib	Hold	51.89	-4.28	Con	-4.28
QC	Terrebonne	Con	Hold	56.48	5.71	Con	5.71
QC	Three Rivers and St. Maurice	Lib	Hold	50.07	-13.83	Con	-13.83
QC	Two Mountains	Lib	Hold	acclaimed			
QC	Vaudreuil	Lib	Hold	54.34	-13.91	Con	-13.91
QC	Wright	Lib	Hold	58.68	3.13	Lib	3.13
QC	Yamaska	Con	Gain	51.28	2.50	Con	-2.50
SK	Assiniboia	Lib	Hold	61.86	8.53	Lib	8.53
SK	Battleford	Lib	Hold	60.76	0.34	Lib	0.34
SK	Humboldt	Lib	Hold	71.14	8.98	Lib	8.98
SK	Mackenzie	Lib	Hold	70.17	4.50	Lib	4.50
SK	Moose Jaw	Lib	Hold	58.19	0.20	Lib	0.20
SK	Prince Albert	Con	Gain	52.83	6.09	Con	-5.16
SK	Qu'Appelle	Lib	Gain	52.59	2.94	Lib	-2.94
SK	Regina	Lib	Hold	54.63	-0.21	Lib	3.29
SK	Saltcoats	Lib	Hold	65.17	11.66	Lib	7.97
SK	Saskatoon	Lib	Hold	54.70	-8.00	Con	-4.63
Terr	Yukon	Con	Gain	60.79	50.03	N/A	

== See also ==
- List of Canadian federal general elections
- List of political parties in Canada
- 11th Canadian Parliament
- 1988 Canadian federal election (Canada-US relations elections)
- 2025 Canadian federal election (Canada-US relations elections)

== See also ==
- 12th Canadian Parliament
