= Blenheim, Ontario =

Blenheim
- Unincorporated community
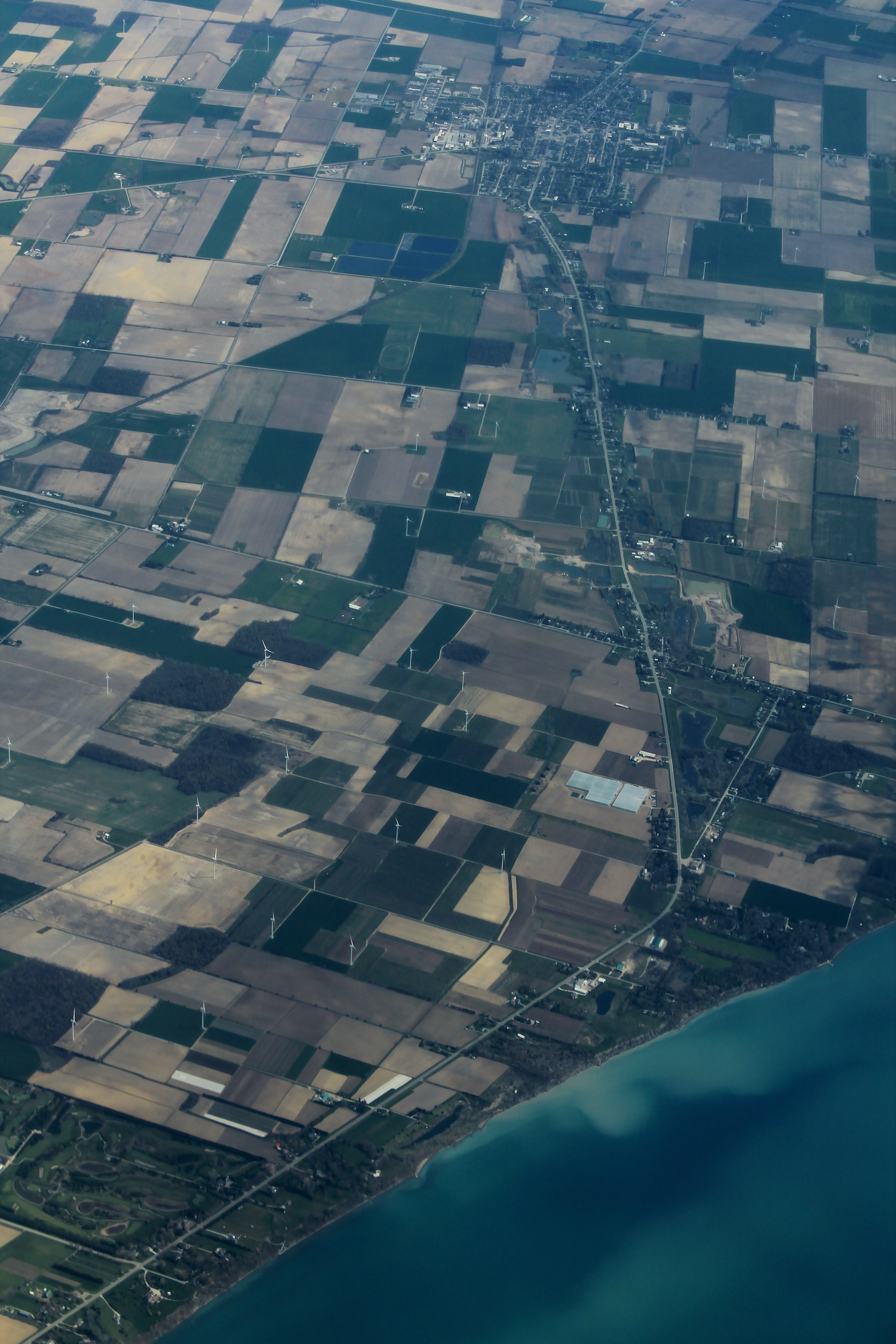
- Aerial view of Blenheim (top centre)
- Nickname: Heart of the Golden Acres
- Location within Municipality of Chatham-Kent Location within Southern Ontario
- Coordinates: 42°20′0″N 81°59′55″W
- Country: Canada
- Province: Ontario
- Municipality: Chatham-Kent
- Settled: 1825
- Incorporated (town): 1885

Area
  - Total: 4.60 km^{2} (1.78 sq mi)

Population (2021)
  - Total: 4,487
  - Density: 974.5/km^{2} (2,524/sq mi)
- Time zone: UTC-5 (EST)
  - Summer (DST): UTC-4 (EDT)
- Canadian postal code: N0P 1A0
- Area codes: 519 and 226
- NTS Map: 040J08
- GNBC Code: FAJXB
- Website: www.blenheimontario.com

Blenheim /ˈblɪnəm/ is a community in Chatham-Kent, Ontario, Canada.

== History ==
Blenheim became a part of the Municipality of Chatham-Kent during the 1998 amalgamation of Kent County and its municipalities. Up until 1988, Blenheim had its own elected officials—a mayor, two reeves, and six councillors. After the 2026 municipal election, the mayor of Chatham-Kent is Michael Bondy. Blenheim is a part of the South-Kent region within the municipality of Chatham-Kent, represented by 3 councilors: Anthony Ceccacci, Mary Clare Latimer, and Trevor Thompson.

== Economy and industry ==
Blenheim is home to a variety of industries including agricultural processing and manufacturing. Numerous local farms sell their products at roadside stands and at markets.

The Ridge Landfill, owned by Waste Connections of Canada, is also located in Blenheim.

== Tourism ==
In July, downtown businesses offer discounts during Ontario's longest running carnival-sidewalk sale, the Cherry Fest and Sidewalk Days. The Cherry Fest has been held annually since 1963; in 2020 and 2021, it was not held in-person due to COVID-19. The Cherry Fest includes a cherry pit spitting contest. J.P. Huggins, organizer of the Cherry Fest, was named Citizen of the Year by the Chatham-Kent Chamber of Commerce in 2021. Blenheim also hosts the Father's Day weekend for the Blenheim Classics Auto-show.

Blenheim is home to two golf courses: Willow Ridge Golf & Country Club and Deer Run. Blenheim also offers a variety of parks and trails including the Talbot Trail place. Other outdoor recreation opportunities can be found in Rondeau Provincial Park, or C.M. Wilson Conservation area.

== Demographics ==
The population of Blenheim is 4,487. In 2021, 27.6% of the resident population in Blenheim were ages 65 or over compared with 19% in Canada. The median age was 50.4 years compared to 41.1 for all of Canada.

=== Indigenous Population ===
- First Nations: 1.8%
- Métis: 1.7%

=== Citizenship and Immigration ===
- Canadian Citizens: 98.5%
- Non-Immigrants: 93.3%
- Immigrants: 6.6%

=== Language Spoken Most Often at Home ===
- English 98.6%
- French: 0.1%
- Non-Official Languages: 0.8%

=== Religion ===
- Christian: 65.3%
  - Catholic: 22.7%
  - United: 13.4%
  - Anglican: 6.8%
- Non-Religious or Secular: 33.5%

=== Education ===
- No Certificate, Diploma, or Degree: 19.5%
- High School Diploma or Equivalency: 33.2%
- Post-Secondary Certificate, Diploma, or Degree: 47.3%

=== Labour Force ===
- Sales and Service: 23.3%
- Trades, Transport, Equipment: 20.2%
- Business and Finance: 12.7%
- Education, Law, Community, Government Services: 10.9%
- Health: 9.8%
- Manufacturing and Utilities: 9.8%
- Natural Resources and Agriculture: 4.7%

== Education ==
Blenheim's elementary and secondary schools are operated by two school boards, the Lambton Kent District School Board and the St. Clair Catholic District School Board.

=== Elementary schools ===
- Harwich-Raleigh Public School is the rural public school. It offers Junior Kindergarten to Grade 8. H.R.P.S offers both English and French Immersion programs. The athletic program of H.R.P.S is called the Wildcats. The school colors are red and white. The motto of the school is: "live to learn, learn to live".
- St. Anne Catholic School serves the rural community and the town, ranging from Junior Kindergarten to Grade 8. St. Anne's also offers both English and French Immersion programs. The athletic program of St. Anne's is called the Stars.
- W.J Baird is the in-town public school and offers Junior Kindergarten to Grade 8. "Baird", as it is known, is home to the Griffins. Its school colours are green and white.

=== Secondary school ===
- Blenheim District High School is Blenheim's only public high school. It is known for hosting community events. B.D.H.S is home to the Blenheim Bobcats, and their colors are Black and Gold. The population of the school has declined in recent years and is currently under 500 students.
  - B.D.H.S. offers a variety of Clubs and Athletics including: Student Union, Sears Drama, Musicals, Redfeather events, Volleyball, Basketball, Football, Cross-Country, Golf, Tennis, Curling, Rugby, Track & Field, and Badminton.

== Media ==
- Blenheim News Tribune: A weekly newspaper published every Wednesday.

== Sports ==
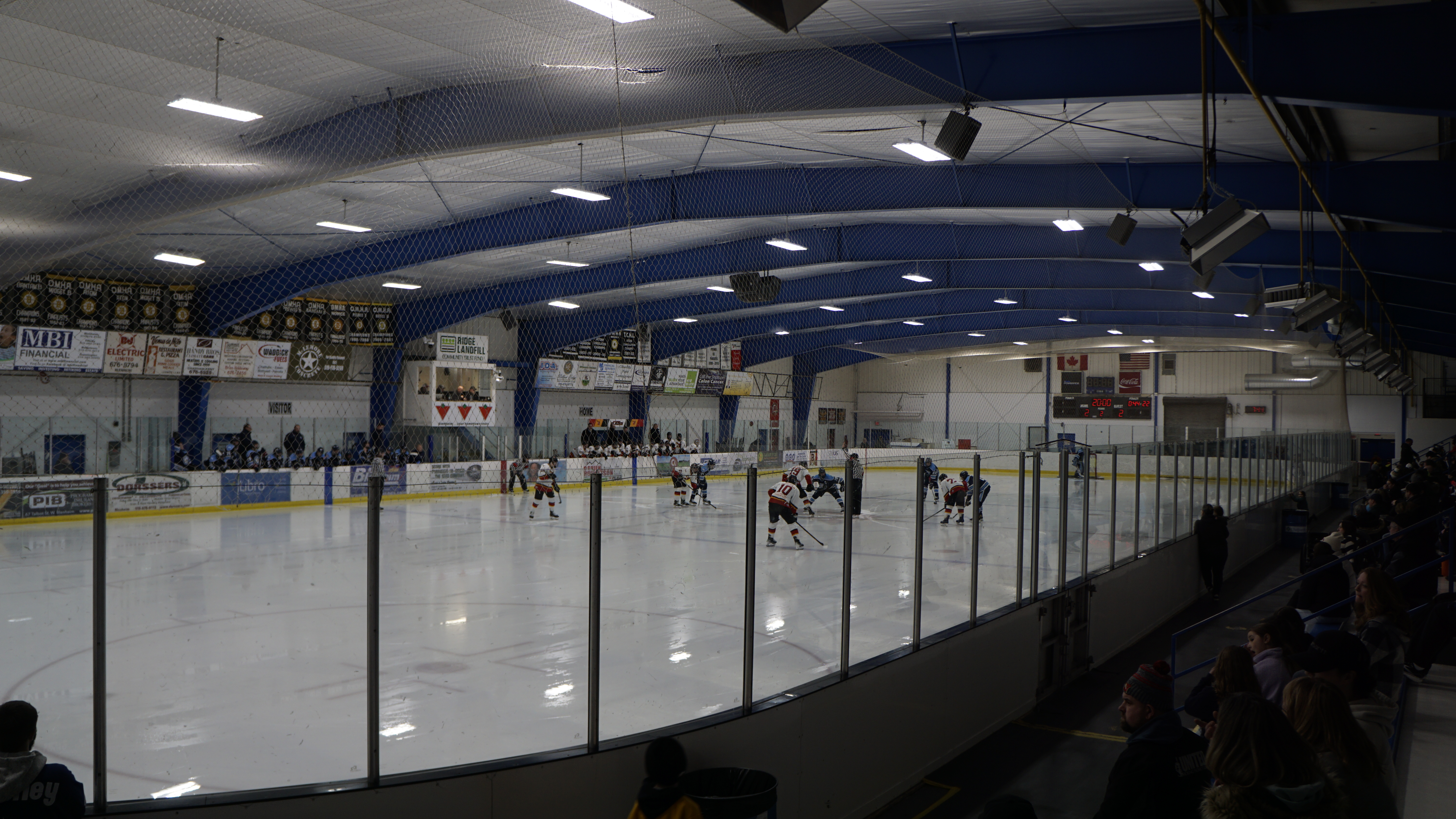
Blenheim Memorial Arena

Blenheim is known for the sports programs of Blenheim District High School, particularly their football and rugby programs. Its ice hockey team is called the Blenheim Blades.

Blenheim also offers a variety of minor and competitive sports including:

- A minor hockey named the South Kent Lightning, formed by the Communities of Blenheim and Ridgetown.
- The minor soccer team is the Blenheim Blaze. It offers both house league and competitive teams within the Sun County Soccer League.
- The Blenheim Golden Eagles Gymnastics Club, which is the longest running gymnastics facility in Chatham-Kent.
- The Blenheim & District Minor Baseball Association
- The Blenheim Blast Swim Team
- The Blenheim Golden Acres Curling Club
- The Blenheim Youth Bowling Club
- The Blenheim Figure Skating Club
- There are two golf courses in Blenheim: Willow Ridge and Deer Run.

Prominent athletes from Blenheim include hockey player Todd Warriner.

== Notable people ==
- Bob Izumi
- Frederic Lister Burk
- Charles Hefferon
- Ron Pardo
- George Perry
- Benjamin Parkyn Richardson
- Cassandra Vasik
- Todd Warriner
