= By-election to the 25th Canadian Parliament =

One by-election to the 25th Canadian Parliament was held to fill a vacancy in the House of Commons of Canada between the 1962 federal election and the 1963 federal election. The Progressive Conservative Party of Canada led a minority government for the entirety of the 25th Canadian Parliament.

The vacancy was created due to the resignation of a New Democratic Party Member of Parliament. Tommy Douglas, elected leader of the New Democratic Party a year prior to the 1962 general election in the 1961 New Democratic Party founding convention, did not gain his riding in the 1962 election, and instead ran in a later by-election.

By-election	Date	Incumbent	Party	Winner	Party	Cause	Retained
Burnaby—Coquitlam	October 22, 1962	Erhart Regier	New Democratic	Tommy Douglas	New Democratic	Resignation to provide a seat for Douglas	Yes

== See also ==
- List of federal by-elections in Canada

== Sources ==
- Parliament of Canada–Elected in By-Elections
