= 25th Canadian Parliament =

1962–63 legislative term

- Minority parliament
- Sep. 27, 1962 – Feb. 6, 1963

Parliament leaders
- Prime minister: John Diefenbaker; Jun. 21, 1957 – Apr. 22, 1963
- Cabinet: 18th Canadian Ministry
- Leader of the Opposition: Lester B. Pearson; January 16, 1958 – April 22, 1963

Party caucuses
- Government: Progressive Conservative Party
- Opposition: Liberal Party
- Crossbench: Co-operative Commonwealth Federation
- Social Credit Party

House of Commons
- Seating arrangements of the House of Commons
- Speaker of the Commons: Marcel Lambert; September 27, 1962 – May 15, 1963
- Government House leader: Gordon Churchill; January 14, 1960 − February 5, 1963
- Opposition House leader: Lionel Chevrier; October 14, 1957 – February 5, 1963
- Members: 265 MP seats List of members

Senate
- Speaker of the Senate: George Stanley White; September 24, 1962 − April 26, 1963
- Government Senate leader: Alfred Johnson Brooks; August 31, 1962 − April 21, 1963
- Opposition Senate leader: William Ross Macdonald; June 21, 1957 – April 22, 1963
- Senators: 102 senator seats List of senators

Sovereign
- Monarch: Elizabeth II; 6 February 1952 – 8 September 2022
- Governor general: Georges Vanier; 15 September 1959 – 5 March 1967

Sessions
- 1st session 27 September 1962 – 6 February 1963
← 24th	→ 26th

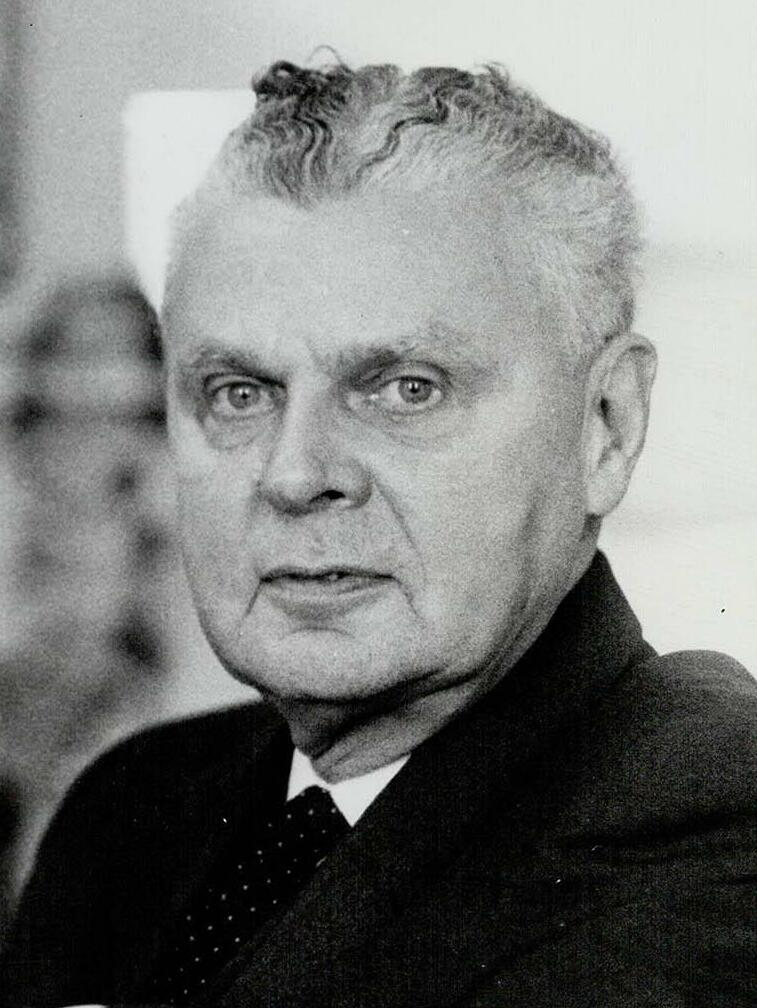
John Diefenbaker (pictured here in 1962) was Prime Minister during the 25th Canadian Parliament.

The 25th Canadian Parliament was in session from September 27, 1962, until February 6, 1963. The membership was set by the 1962 federal election on June 18, 1962, and it changed only somewhat due to resignations and by-elections until it was dissolved prior to the 1963 election.

There was only one session of the 25th Parliament:

Session	Start	End
1st	September 27, 1962	February 6, 1963

== Overview ==
It was controlled by a Progressive Conservative Party minority under Prime Minister John Diefenbaker and the 18th Canadian Ministry. The Official Opposition was the Liberal Party, led by Lester B. Pearson.

It was the third shortest parliament in Canadian history.

== Party standings ==
Number of members per party	Party leader	General Election
Number of members per party	Party leader	June 18th, 1962
Progressive Conservative	John Diefenbaker	116
Liberal	Lester B. Pearson	99
Social Credit	R.N. Thompson	30
New Democratic Party	Tommy Douglas	19
Liberal - Labour		1
Total Seats	264	

== Major events ==
=== The Cuban Missile Crisis ===
Though the Cuban Missile Crisis began on October 14, 1962, American President John F. Kennedy did not consult with other nations for several days. Diefenbaker was initially skeptical about the supposed evidence and proposed sending envoys from the United Nations to inspect further.

Relations between Kennedy and Diefenbaker had been historically tense, owing partially to the infamous "Rostow Memo" incident where an internal American memo had been left behind by Kennedy's team after he had met with Diefenbaker. The memo detailed items that the American's wished to "push" Canada on, and Diefenbaker believed that the Americans were attempting to use their position to dominate Canada.

Diefenbaker was reluctant to put Canadian troops on alert, angering the American's. When he eventually did so, the climax of the crisis had passed.

=== Nuclear Weapons ===
Historic agreements with NATO and NORAD in the 50s required Canada to drastically increase its defense spending. Diefenbaker had difficulty with the issue throughout his tenure. Questions about whether Canada should arm itself with nuclear warheads purchased from America drew international attention. Canada had long held an anti-nuclear proliferation position, but by the early 60s, external pressure had forced Diefenbaker toward making a difficult decision on the matter.

Liberal opposition leader, Lester B. Pearson, stated his support for fulfilling Canada's commitment to accept nuclear weapons, despite his opposition to nuclear weapons in general. This put increased pressure on Diefenbaker, whose cabinet was split over the matter. On February 3, 1963, members of the cabinet turned on Diefenbaker, in light of his inaction, and three days later his government fell.

== Ministry ==
The 18th Canadian Ministry began at the beginning of the 23rd Canadian Parliament and lasted until near the end of the 25th Canadian Parliament.

== Office holders ==
=== Head of State ===
position	Image	Name	Assumed office	Left office
Sovereign		Elizabeth II	February 6, 1952	September 8, 2022
Governor General		Georges Vanier	September 15, 1959	March 5, 1967

=== Party leadership ===
Party	Photo	Name	Assumed office	Left office
Progressive Conservative		John Diefenbaker	December 14, 1956	September 8, 1967
Liberal		Lester B. Pearson	January 16, 1958	April 6, 1968
Social Credit		R.N. Thompson	July 7, 1961	March 9, 1967
New Democratic		Tommy Douglas	August 3, 1961	April 24, 1971

=== House of Commons ===
==== Presiding officer ====
Office	Photo	Officer	Riding	Assumed office	Left office	Party
Speaker of the House of Commons		Marcel Lambert	Edmonton West	September 27, 1962	May 15, 1963	Progressive Conservative

==== Government leadership (Progressive Conservative) ====
Office	Photo	Officer	Riding	Assumed office	Left office
Prime Minister		John Diefenbaker	Prince Albert	June 21, 1957	April 22, 1963
House Leader		Gordon Churchill	Winnipeg South Centre	January 14, 1960	February 5, 1963
Whip		Théogène Ricard	Hull	1962	1963

== Changes to party standings ==
=== By-elections ===
By-election	Date	Incumbent	Party	Winner	Party	Cause	Retained
Burnaby—Coquitlam	October 22, 1962	Erhart Regier	New Democratic	Tommy Douglas	New Democratic	Resignation to provide a seat for Douglas	Yes

== Parliamentarians ==
=== House of Commons ===
Following is a full list of members of the twenty-fifth Parliament listed first by province or territory, then by electoral district.

Key:

- Party leaders are italicized.
- Parliamentary secretaries is indicated by "‡".
- Cabinet ministers are in **boldface**.
- The Prime Minister is **both**.
- The Speaker is indicated by "(†)".

Electoral districts denoted by an asterisk (*) indicates that district was represented by two members.

=== Alberta ===
Electoral district	Name	Party	First elected/previously elected	No. of terms
Acadia	Jack Horner	Progressive Conservative	1958	2nd term
Athabaska	Jack Bigg	Progressive Conservative	1958	2nd term
Battle River—Camrose	Clifford Smallwood	Progressive Conservative	1958	2nd term
Bow River	Eldon Woolliams	Progressive Conservative	1958	2nd term
Calgary North	**Douglas Harkness**	Progressive Conservative	1945	6th term
Calgary South	Arthur Ryan Smith	Progressive Conservative	1957	3rd term
Edmonton East	William Skoreyko	Progressive Conservative	1958	2nd term
Edmonton—Strathcona	Terry Nugent	Progressive Conservative	1958	2nd term
Edmonton West	**Marcel Lambert** (†)	Progressive Conservative	1957	3rd term
Jasper—Edson	Hugh Horner	Progressive Conservative	1958	2nd term
Lethbridge	Deane Gundlock	Progressive Conservative	1958	2nd term
Macleod	Lawrence Kindt	Progressive Conservative	1958	2nd term
Medicine Hat	Bud Olson	Social Credit	1957, 1962	2nd term*
Peace River	Ged Baldwin ‡	Progressive Conservative	1958	2nd term
Red Deer	Robert N. Thompson	Social Credit	1962	1st term
Vegreville	Frank Fane	Progressive Conservative	1958	2nd term
Wetaskiwin	Harry Andrew Moore	Progressive Conservative	1962	1st term

=== British Columbia ===
Electoral district	Name	Party	First elected/previously elected	No. of terms
Burnaby—Coquitlam	Erhart Regier (resigned 20 August 1962)	New Democratic Party	1953	4th term
Burnaby—Coquitlam	Tommy Douglas (by-election of 1962-10-22)	New Democratic Party	1935, (Note: Weyburn (Saskatchewan)) 1962	3rd term*
Burnaby—Richmond	Bob Prittie	New Democratic Party	1962	1st term
Cariboo	Bert Leboe	Social Credit	1953, 1962	3rd term*
Coast—Capilano	John (Jack) Davis	Liberal	1962	1st term
Comox—Alberni	Thomas Speakman Barnett	New Democratic Party	1953, 1962	3rd term*
Esquimalt—Saanich	George Chatterton	Progressive Conservative	1961	2nd term
Fraser Valley	Alexander Bell Patterson	Social Credit	1953, 1962	3rd term*
Kamloops	**Davie Fulton**	Progressive Conservative	1945	6th term
Kootenay East	Jim Byrne	Liberal	1949, 1962	4th term*
Kootenay West	Herbert Wilfred Herridge	New Democratic Party	1945	6th term
Nanaimo—Cowichan—The Islands	Colin Cameron	New Democratic Party	1953, 1962	3rd term*
New Westminster	Barry Mather	New Democratic Party	1962	1st term
Okanagan Boundary	David Vaughan Pugh	Progressive Conservative	1958	2nd term
Okanagan—Revelstoke	Stuart Fleming	Progressive Conservative	1958	2nd term
Skeena	Frank Howard	New Democratic Party	1957	3rd term
Vancouver—Burrard	Thomas R. Berger	New Democratic Party	1962	1st term
Vancouver Centre	John Robert (Jack) Nicholson	Liberal	1962	1st term
Vancouver East	Harold Winch	New Democratic Party	1953	4th term
Vancouver Kingsway	Arnold Webster	New Democratic Party	1962	1st term
Vancouver Quadra	**Howard Charles Green**	Progressive Conservative	1935	8th term
Vancouver South	Arthur Laing	Liberal	1949, 1962	2nd term*
Victoria	Albert McPhillips ‡	Progressive Conservative	1957	3rd term

=== Manitoba ===
Electoral district	Name	Party	First elected/previously elected	No. of terms
Brandon—Souris	**Walter Dinsdale**	Progressive Conservative	1951	5th term
Churchill	Robert Simpson	Progressive Conservative	1957	3rd term
Dauphin	Elmer Forbes	Progressive Conservative	1958	2nd term
Lisgar	George Muir	Progressive Conservative	1957	3rd term
Marquette	Nick Mandziuk	Progressive Conservative	1957	3rd term
Portage—Neepawa	Siegfried Enns	Progressive Conservative	1962	1st term
Provencher	Warner Jorgenson ‡	Progressive Conservative	1957	3rd term
Selkirk	Eric Stefanson Sr.	Progressive Conservative	1958	2nd term
Springfield	Joseph Slogan	Progressive Conservative	1958	2nd term
St. Boniface	Roger Teillet	Liberal	1962	1st term
Winnipeg North	David Orlikow	New Democratic Party	1962	1st term
Winnipeg North Centre	Stanley Knowles	New Democratic Party	1942, 1962	6th term*
Winnipeg South	Gordon Chown	Progressive Conservative	1957	3rd term
Winnipeg South Centre	**Gordon Churchill**	Progressive Conservative	1951	5th term

=== New Brunswick ===
Electoral district	Name	Party	First elected/previously elected	No. of terms
Charlotte	Allan M.A. McLean	Liberal	1962	1st term
Gloucester	Hédard Robichaud	Liberal	1953	4th term
Kent	Guy Crossman	Liberal	1962	1st term
Northumberland—Miramichi	George Roy McWilliam	Liberal	1949	5th term
Restigouche—Madawaska	Jean-Eudes Dubé	Liberal	1962	1st term
Royal	Gordon Fairweather	Progressive Conservative	1962	1st term
St. John—Albert	Thomas Miller Bell ‡	Progressive Conservative	1953	4th term
Victoria—Carleton	**Hugh John Flemming**	Progressive Conservative	1960	2nd term
Westmorland	Sherwood Rideout	Liberal	1962	1st term
York—Sunbury	John Chester MacRae	Progressive Conservative	1957	3rd term

=== Newfoundland ===
Electoral district	Name	Party	First elected/previously elected	No. of terms
Bonavista—Twillingate	Jack Pickersgill	Liberal	1953	4th term
Burin—Burgeo	Chesley William Carter	Liberal	1949	5th term
Grand Falls—White Bay—Labrador	Charles Granger	Liberal	1958	2nd term
Humber—St. George's	Herman Maxwell Batten	Liberal	1953	4th term
St. John's East	James McGrath ‡	Progressive Conservative	1957	3rd term
St. John's West	Richard Cashin	Liberal	1962	1st term
Trinity—Conception	James Roy Tucker	Liberal	1958	2nd term

=== Northwest Territories ===
Electoral district	Name	Party	First elected/previously elected	No. of terms
Northwest Territories	Isabel Tibbie Hardie	Liberal	1962	1st term

=== Nova Scotia ===
Electoral district	Name	Party	First elected/previously elected	No. of terms
Antigonish—Guysborough	John Benjamin Stewart	Liberal	1962	1st term
Cape Breton North and Victoria	Robert Muir	Progressive Conservative	1957	3rd term
Cape Breton South	Malcolm MacInnis	New Democratic Party	1962	1st term
Colchester—Hants	Cyril Kennedy	Progressive Conservative	1957	3rd term
Cumberland	Robert Coates	Progressive Conservative	1957	3rd term
Digby—Annapolis—Kings	**George Nowlan**	Progressive Conservative	1948, 1950	6th term*
Halifax*	Robert McCleave ‡	Progressive Conservative	1957	3rd term
Halifax*	Edmund L. Morris	Progressive Conservative	1957	3rd term
Inverness—Richmond	Allan MacEachen	Liberal	1953, 1962	3rd term*
Pictou	Russell MacEwan	Progressive Conservative	1957	3rd term
Queens—Lunenburg	Lloyd Crouse	Progressive Conservative	1957	3rd term
Shelburne—Yarmouth—Clare	Felton Legere	Progressive Conservative	1958	2nd term

=== Ontario ===
Electoral district	Name	Party	First elected/previously elected	No. of terms
Algoma East	Lester B. Pearson	Liberal	1948	6th term
Algoma West	George E. Nixon	Liberal	1940	7th term
Brantford	James Elisha Brown	Liberal	1953, 1962	2nd term*
Brant—Haldimand	Lawrence Pennell	Liberal	1962	1st term
Broadview	**George Hees**	Progressive Conservative	1950	5th term
Bruce	Andrew Ernest Robinson	Progressive Conservative	1945, 1953	5th term*
Carleton	**Dick Bell**	Progressive Conservative	1957	3rd term
Cochrane	Joseph-Anaclet Habel	Liberal	1953	4th term
Danforth	Reid Scott	New Democratic Party	1962	1st term
Davenport	Walter L. Gordon	Liberal	1962	1st term
Dufferin—Simcoe	William Earl Rowe	Progressive Conservative	1925	11th term
Durham	Russell Honey	Liberal	1962	1st term
Eglinton	**Donald Fleming**	Progressive Conservative	1945	6th term
Elgin	James Alexander McBain ‡	Progressive Conservative	1954	4th term
Essex East	Paul Martin Sr.	Liberal	1935	8th term
Essex South	Eugene Whelan	Liberal	1962	1st term
Essex West	Herb Gray	Liberal	1962	1st term
Fort William	Hubert Badanai	Liberal	1958	2nd term
Glengarry—Prescott	Viateur Éthier	Liberal	1962	1st term
Greenwood	Andrew Brewin	New Democratic Party	1962	1st term
Grenville—Dundas	Jean Casselman Wadds ‡	Progressive Conservative	1958	2nd term
Grey—Bruce	Eric Winkler	Progressive Conservative	1957	3rd term
Grey North	Percy Verner Noble	Progressive Conservative	1957	3rd term
Halton	Harry Harley	Liberal	1962	1st term
Hamilton East	John Munro	Liberal	1962	1st term
Hamilton South	Bob McDonald	Progressive Conservative	1957	3rd term
Hamilton West	**Ellen Fairclough**	Progressive Conservative	1950	5th term
Hastings—Frontenac	Rod Webb	Progressive Conservative	1959	2nd term
Hastings South	Lee Grills	Progressive Conservative	1957	3rd term
High Park	Pat Cameron	Liberal	1949, 1962	3rd term*
Huron	Elston Cardiff	Progressive Conservative	1940	7th term
Kenora—Rainy River	William Moore Benidickson	Liberal-Labour	1945	6th term
Kent	Sidney LeRoi Clunis	Liberal	1962	1st term
Kingston	Edgar Benson	Liberal	1962	1st term
Lambton—Kent	John Wesley Burgess	Liberal	1962	1st term
Lambton West	Walter Frank Foy	Liberal	1962	1st term
Lanark	George Doucett	Progressive Conservative	1957	3rd term
Leeds	John Matheson	Liberal	1961	2nd term
Lincoln	James McNulty	Liberal	1962	1st term
London	**Ernest Halpenny**	Progressive Conservative	1957	3rd term
Middlesex East	Campbell Millar	Progressive Conservative	1962	1st term
Middlesex West	William Howell Arthur Thomas	Progressive Conservative	1957	3rd term
Niagara Falls	Judy LaMarsh	Liberal	1960	2nd term
Nickel Belt	Osias Godin	Liberal	1958	2nd term
Nipissing	Jack Garland	Liberal	1949	5th term
Norfolk	Jack Roxburgh	Liberal	1962	1st term
Northumberland	Harry Oliver Bradley	Progressive Conservative	1962	1st term
Ontario	**Michael Starr**	Progressive Conservative	1952	5th term
Ottawa East	Jean-Thomas Richard	Liberal	1945	6th term
Ottawa West	George McIlraith	Liberal	1940	7th term
Oxford	Wally Nesbitt ‡	Progressive Conservative	1953	4th term
Parkdale	Stanley Haidasz	Liberal	1957, (Note: Trinity) 1962	2nd term*
Parry Sound-Muskoka	Gordon Aiken	Progressive Conservative	1957	3rd term
Peel	Bruce Beer	Liberal	1962	1st term
Perth	**J. Waldo Monteith**	Progressive Conservative	1953	4th term
Peterborough	Fred Stenson	Progressive Conservative	1962	1st term
Port Arthur	Doug Fisher	New Democratic Party	1957	3rd term
Prince Edward—Lennox	Douglas Alkenbrack	Progressive Conservative	1962	1st term
Renfrew North	James Forgie	Liberal	1953	4th term
Renfrew South	James William Baskin	Progressive Conservative	1957	3rd term
Rosedale	Donald Stovel Macdonald	Liberal	1962	1st term
Russell	Paul Tardif	Liberal	1959	2nd term
St. Paul's	Ian Wahn	Liberal	1962	1st term
Simcoe East	Philip Bernard Rynard	Progressive Conservative	1957	3rd term
Simcoe North	Heber Smith	Progressive Conservative	1957	3rd term
Spadina	Sylvester Perry Ryan	Liberal	1962	1st term
Stormont	Lucien Lamoureux	Liberal	1962	1st term
Sudbury	Rodger Mitchell	Liberal	1953	4th term
Timiskaming	Arnold Peters	New Democratic Party	1957	3rd term
Timmins	Murdo Martin	New Democratic Party	1957	3rd term
Trinity	Paul Hellyer	Liberal	1949, (Note: Davenport) 1958	4th term*
Victoria	Clayton Hodgson	Progressive Conservative	1945	6th term
Waterloo North	Oscar Weichel	Progressive Conservative	1958	2nd term
Waterloo South	Gordon Chaplin	Progressive Conservative	1962	1st term
Welland	William Hector McMillan	Liberal	1950	5th term
Wellington—Huron	Marvin Howe	Progressive Conservative	1953	4th term
Wellington South	Alfred Hales ‡	Progressive Conservative	1957	3rd term
Wentworth	Joseph Reed Sams	Progressive Conservative	1962	1st term
York Centre	James Edgar Walker	Liberal	1962	1st term
York East	Steven Otto	Liberal	1962	1st term
York—Humber	Ralph Cowan	Liberal	1962	1st term
York North	John Hollings Addison	Liberal	1962	1st term
York—Scarborough	**Frank Charles McGee** ‡	Progressive Conservative	1957	3rd term
York South	David Lewis	New Democratic Party	1962	1st term
York West	Red Kelly	Liberal	1962	1st term

=== Prince Edward Island ===
Electoral district	Name	Party	First elected/previously elected	No. of terms
King's	Margaret Mary Macdonald	Progressive Conservative	1961	2nd term
Prince	Orville Howard Phillips	Progressive Conservative	1957	3rd term
Queen's*	**Angus MacLean**	Progressive Conservative	1951	5th term
Queen's*	Heath MacQuarrie ‡	Progressive Conservative	1957	3rd term

=== Quebec ===
Electoral district	Name	Party	First elected/previously elected	No. of terms
Argenteuil—Deux-Montagnes	Vincent Drouin	Liberal	1962	1st term
Beauce	Gérard Perron	Social Credit	1962	1st term
Beauharnois—Salaberry	Gérald Laniel	Liberal	1962	1st term
Bellechasse	Bernard Dumont	Social Credit	1962	1st term
Berthier—Maskinongé—Delanaudière	Rémi Paul	Progressive Conservative	1958	2nd term
Bonaventure	Albert Béchard	Liberal	1962	1st term
Brome—Missisquoi	Heward Grafftey ‡	Progressive Conservative	1958	2nd term
Cartier	Leon Crestohl	Liberal	1950	5th term
Chambly—Rouville	Bernard Pilon	Liberal	1962	1st term
Champlain	Jean-Paul Matte	Liberal	1962	1st term
Chapleau	Gérard Laprise	Social Credit	1962	1st term
Charlevoix	Louis-Philippe-Antoine Bélanger	Social Credit	1962	1st term
Châteauguay—Huntingdon—Laprairie	Jean Boucher	Liberal	1953, 1962	3rd term*
Chicoutimi	Maurice Côté	Social Credit	1962	1st term
Compton—Frontenac	Henry Latulippe	Social Credit	1962	1st term
Dollard	Guy Rouleau	Liberal	1953	4th term
Dorchester	Pierre-André Boutin	Social Credit	1962	1st term
Drummond—Arthabaska	David Ouellet	Social Credit	1962	1st term
Gaspé	Roland English	Progressive Conservative	1957	3rd term
Gatineau	Rodolphe Leduc	Liberal	1936, 1954	6th term*
Hochelaga	Raymond Eudes	Liberal	1940	7th term
Hull	Alexis Caron	Liberal	1953	4th term
Îles-de-la-Madeleine	Maurice Sauvé	Liberal	1962	1st term
Jacques-Cartier—Lasalle	Raymond Rock	Liberal	1962	1st term
Joliette—l'Assomption—Montcalm	Louis-Joseph Pigeon ‡	Progressive Conservative	1958	2nd term
Kamouraska	Charles-Eugène Dionne	Social Credit	1962	1st term
Labelle	Gaston Clermont	Liberal	1960	2nd term
Lac-Saint-Jean	Marcel Lessard	Social Credit	1962	1st term
Lafontaine	Georges-C. Lachance	Liberal	1962	1st term
Lapointe	Gilles Grégoire	Social Credit	1962	1st term
Laurier	Lionel Chevrier	Liberal	1935, (Note: Stormont (Ontario)) 1957	8th term*
Laval	Jean-Léo Rochon	Liberal	1962	1st term
Lévis	J.-Aurélien Roy	Social Credit	1962	1st term
Longueuil	**Pierre Sévigny**	Progressive Conservative	1958	2nd term
Lotbinière	**Raymond O'Hurley**	Progressive Conservative	1957	3rd term
Maisonneuve—Rosemont	Jean-Paul Deschatelets	Liberal	1953	4th term
Matapédia—Matane	Alfred Belzile	Progressive Conservative	1958	2nd term
Mégantic	Raymond Langlois	Social Credit	1962	1st term
Mercier	Prosper Boulanger	Liberal	1962	1st term
Montmagny—L'Islet	Jean-Paul Cook	Social Credit	1962	1st term
Mount Royal	Alan Macnaughton	Liberal	1949	5th term
Nicolet—Yamaska	Clément Vincent	Progressive Conservative	1962	1st term
Notre-Dame-de-Grâce	Edmund Tobin Asselin	Liberal	1962	1st term
Outremont—St-Jean	Romuald Bourque	Liberal	1952	5th term
Papineau	Adrien Meunier	Liberal	1953	4th term
Pontiac—Témiscamingue	**Paul Martineau**	Progressive Conservative	1958	2nd term
Portneuf	Jean-Louis Frenette	Social Credit	1962	1st term
Québec—Montmorency	Guy Marcoux	Social Credit	1962	1st term
Quebec East	Jean Robert Beaulé	Social Credit	1962	1st term
Quebec South	Jean-Charles Cantin	Liberal	1962	1st term
Quebec West	Lucien Plourde	Social Credit	1962	1st term
Richelieu—Verchères	Lucien Cardin	Liberal	1952	5th term
Richmond—Wolfe	André Bernier	Social Credit	1962	1st term
Rimouski	Gérard Légaré	Liberal	1953, 1962	3rd term*
Rivière-du-Loup—Témiscouata	Philippe Gagnon	Social Credit	1962	1st term
Roberval	Charles-Arthur Gauthier	Social Credit	1962	1st term
Saguenay	Lauréat Maltais	Social Credit	1962	1st term
St. Ann	Gérard Loiselle	Liberal	1957	3rd term
Saint-Antoine—Westmount	Charles (Bud) Drury	Liberal	1962	1st term
Saint-Denis	Azellus Denis	Liberal	1935	8th term
Saint-Henri	H.-Pit Lessard	Liberal	1958	2nd term
Saint-Hyacinthe—Bagot	**Théogène Ricard** ‡	Progressive Conservative	1957	3rd term
Saint-Jacques	Maurice Rinfret	Liberal	1962	1st term
Saint-Jean—Iberville—Napierville	Yvon Dupuis	Liberal	1958	2nd term
St. Lawrence—St. George	John Turner	Liberal	1962	1st term
Sainte-Marie	Georges Valade	Progressive Conservative	1958	2nd term
Saint-Maurice—Laflèche	Gérard Lamy	Social Credit	1962	1st term
Shefford	Gilbert Rondeau	Social Credit	1962	1st term
Sherbrooke	Gérard Chapdelaine	Social Credit	1962	1st term
Stanstead	René Létourneau	Progressive Conservative	1958	2nd term
Terrebonne	Léo Cadieux	Liberal	1962	1st term
Trois-Rivières	**Léon Balcer**	Progressive Conservative	1949	5th term
Vaudreuil—Soulanges	Marcel Bourbonnais	Progressive Conservative	1958	2nd term
Verdun	Bryce Mackasey	Liberal	1962	1st term
Villeneuve	Réal Caouette	Social Credit	1946, (Note: Pontiac) 1962	2nd term*

=== Saskatchewan ===
Electoral district	Name	Party	First elected/previously elected	No. of terms
Assiniboia	Hazen Argue	Liberal	1945 (Note: First elected as a CCF/New Democratic Party)	6th term
Humboldt—Melfort—Tisdale	Reynold Rapp	Progressive Conservative	1958	2nd term
Kindersley	Robert Hanbidge	Progressive Conservative	1958	2nd term
Mackenzie	Stanley Korchinski	Progressive Conservative	1958	2nd term
Meadow Lake	Bert Cadieu	Progressive Conservative	1958	2nd term
Melville	James Ormiston	Progressive Conservative	1958	2nd term
Moose Jaw—Lake Centre	J. Ernest Pascoe	Progressive Conservative	1958	2nd term
Moose Mountain	Richard Southam	Progressive Conservative	1958	2nd term
Prince Albert	**John Diefenbaker**	Progressive Conservative	1940	7th term
Qu'Appelle	**Alvin Hamilton**	Progressive Conservative	1957	3rd term
Regina City	Ken More	Progressive Conservative	1958	2nd term
Rosetown—Biggar	Clarence Owen Cooper	Progressive Conservative	1958	2nd term
Rosthern	Edward Nasserden	Progressive Conservative	1958	2nd term
Saskatoon	Henry Frank Jones ‡	Progressive Conservative	1957	3rd term
Swift Current—Maple Creek	Jack McIntosh	Progressive Conservative	1958	2nd term
The Battlefords	Albert Horner	Progressive Conservative	1958	2nd term
Yorkton	G. Drummond Clancy	Progressive Conservative	1958	2nd term

=== Yukon ===
Electoral district	Name	Party	First elected/previously elected	No. of terms
Yukon	Erik Nielsen	Progressive Conservative	1957	3rd term

== Legislation and motions ==
=== Act's which received royal assent under 25th Parliament ===
==== 1st Session ====
===== Public acts =====
Date of Assent	Index	Title	Bill Number
October 25, 1962	1	Appropriation Act No. 6, 1962	C-68
November 1, 1962	2	Export Credits Insurance Act, An Act to amend the	C-63
November 29, 1962	3	Appropriation Act No. 7, 1962	C-86
November 29, 1962	4	Combines Investigation Act and the Criminal Code, An Act to amend the	C-49
November 29, 1962	5	Estate Tax Act, An Act to amend the	C-79
November 29, 1962	6	Excise Tax Act, An Act to amend the	C-80
November 29, 1962	7	Farm Credit Act, An Act to amend the	C-71
November 29, 1962	8	Income Tax Act, An Act to amend the	C-78
December 20, 1962	9	Appropriation Act No. 8, 1962	C-105
December 20, 1962	10	Atlantic Development Board Act	C-94
December 20, 1962	11	Canadian National Railway — construction of a line of railway in the Province of New Brunswick from Nepisiguit Junction to the property of Brunswick Mining and Smelting Corporation Limited, a distance of approximately 15 miles	C-93
December 20, 1962	12	Canadian World Exhibition Corporation Act	C-103
December 20, 1962	13	Coal Production Assistance Act, An Act to amend the	C-64
December 20, 1962	14	Federal-Provincial Fiscal Arrangements Act and the Federal-Provincial Tax-Sharing Arrangements Act, An Act to amend the	C-101
December 20, 1962	15	Food and Drugs Act, An Act to amend the	C-3
December 20, 1962	16	National Health and Welfare Act, An Act to amend the Department of	C-4
December 20, 1962	17	National Housing Act, 1954, An Act to amend the	C-102

Local and Private Acts

Date of Assent	Index	Title	Bill Number
November 29, 1962 and December 20, 1962	18	Imperial Life Assurance Company of Canada, An Act respecting the	S-16
November 29, 1962 and December 20, 1962	19	Merit Insurance Company, An Act respecting	S-14
November 29, 1962 and December 20, 1962	20	North American General Insurance Company, An Act respecting the	S-6
November 29, 1962 and December 20, 1962	21	Canadian Pacific Railway Company, An Act respecting	S-4
November 29, 1962 and December 20, 1962	22	Christian Brothers of Ireland in Canada, An Act to incorporate the	S-7
November 29, 1962 and December 20, 1962	23	Trustee Board of the Presbyterian Church in Canada, An Act respecting the	S-8
November 29, 1962 and December 20, 1962	24	Eastern Trust Company, An Act respecting the	S-5

== See also ==
- List of Canadian electoral districts 1952-1966 for a list of the ridings in this parliament.
