= Burt Wendell Fansher =

Canadian politician

Member of Parliament for Lambton East
- In office December 1921 – October 1925
- Preceded by: Joseph Emmanuel Armstrong
- Succeeded by: Joseph Emmanuel Armstrong
- In office September 1926 – July 1930
- Preceded by: Joseph Emmanuel Armstrong
- Succeeded by: John Thomas Sproule

Personal details
- Born: Burt Wendell Fansher; 6 May 1880 Florence, Ontario
- Died: 1 April 1941 (aged 60)
- Party: Progressive
- Spouse(s): Meda Walker m. 1 July 1922
- Profession: farmer

Burt Wendell Fansher (6 May 1880 – 1 April 1941) was a Progressive party member of the House of Commons of Canada who, in the 1935 federal election, ran as a Reconstruction Party candidate. He was born in Florence, Ontario and became a farmer.

Fansher attended Ontario Agricultural College.

He was first elected to Parliament at the Lambton East riding in the 1921 general election when he defeated Conservative incumbent Joseph Emmanuel Armstrong. After serving one term at Lambton East, Armstrong defeated Fansher in the 1925 election. In the 1926 election, Fansher won back the riding from Armstrong. After another term, Fansher was defeated by John Thomas Sproule of the Conservatives in the 1930 federal election.

After riding boundary changes, Fansher made one more attempt to return to the House of Commons at the newly configured Lambton—Kent riding in the 1935 federal election. On this occasion, Fansher ran as a Reconstruction Party candidate but both he and Sproule lost to Hugh MacKenzie of the Liberals.
