= Prairie Giant =

2006 Canadian TV miniseries about Tommy Douglas

Prairie Giant: The Tommy Douglas Story is a CBC Television miniseries first aired in two consecutive parts on March 12 and March 13, 2006. It dramatizes and fictionalizes the life and career of Tommy Douglas, the Canadian politician who oversaw the legislation of Canada's first public healthcare program as Premier of Saskatchewan. The production is directed by John N. Smith and produced by Kevin DeWalt with Minds Eye Entertainment.

== Cast ==
- Michael Therriault - Tommy Douglas
- Kristin Booth - Irma Douglas
- Graham Bell - Mr. Fortier
- Nicholas Campbell - Edward James Young
- Brent Carver - Secretary Balsam (fictional)
- Aidan Devine - M.J. Coldwell
- Paul Gross - John Diefenbaker
- Shannon Jardine - Lally
- Andy Jones - Mackenzie King
- Robert Maloney - Woodrow S. Lloyd
- Brian Markinson - Jimmy Gardiner
- Don McKellar - Clarence Fines
- Rob Roy - Weyburn Arena Moderator
- R.H. Thomson - Dr. Moulds (fictional)
- Ian Tracey - Charlie Lawson
- Kent Wolkowski - Danny Reeves
- Mackenzie Blaisdell - Shirley Douglas (childhood)
- Christine MacInnis - Shirley Douglas (adult)
- Ian Black - Tommy Douglas Sr.

== Response ==
The CBC promoted Prairie Giant as a "real story about real people" but the series was subjected to widespread commentary on the fallacies present in the story line. Historical fallacies and omissions concerning the mischaracterization of James Garfield Gardiner were identified.

On March 16, 2006, Saskatoon StarPhoenix political columnist Randy Burton wrote, "It was wonderful television but abysmal history.... On almost every score, scriptwriter Bruce Smith got Gardiner wrong."

On March 17, 2006, Regina Leader-Post political columnist Murray Mandryk stated, "a project like this has to be some level of historical accuracy and it is in the script itself where the movie fails. The most egregious example of this was clearly the Estevan riot ... Gardiner was not the premier of the day and he didn't give a province-wide radio address attacking the strikers as communists and undesirable immigrants." Mandryk stated that former NDP Premier Allan Blakeney stated "he was not Saint Tommy and nor was Jimmy Gardiner the epitome of evil."

On July 9, 2006, former Co-operative Commonwealth Federation MP and well-known journalist Douglas Fisher described the film as "A Shoddy Portrait of another Prairie Giant."

On June 12, 2006, CBC Executive Vice-President Richard Stursberg, stated, "I regret the mischaracterization of James Garfield Gardiner in the mini-series 'Prairie Giant: The Tommy Douglas Story' that we aired". He further stated, "To help us address the criticisms, we engaged an outside third-party historian... to assess the way in which Mr. Gardiner was depicted. I regret to say that his conclusion was that the character created for the film does not reflect the accepted historical record". The CBC pulled Prairie Giant from future scheduled broadcasts and stated that it would return if it found a solution to address the historical fallacies. On 10 September 2007, it was announced that the controversial CBC miniseries would be rebroadcast with no changes on another channel, Vision TV, on September 25 and 27.

Attention has also been drawn to the funding provided to the film by the Saskatchewan government.

== Funding ==
Below is a general breakdown of the direct funding the film received:

Funding Source	Amount (CDN$)
Telefilm Canada - Equity Investment Program	$2,480,000
Saskatchewan Film Employment Tax Credit	$1,589,606
Canadian Television Fund - Licence Fee Top-Up Program	$1,520,000
CBC - Broadcast licence	$1,204,500
Government of Saskatchewan - Saskatchewan Centennial 2005	$614,000
Canadian Film or Video Production Tax Credit	$471,494
CanWest Western Independent Producers Fund	$110,000

== Awards ==
Prairie Giant was nominated for a total of nine Genie Awards, including:

- Best Dramatic Mini-Series – Nomination (Kevin DeWalt, producer)
- Best Writing in a Dramatic Program or Mini-Series – Nomination (Bruce M. Smith)
- Best Production Design or Art Direction in a Dramatic Program or Series – Nomination (Kathy McCoy, Kim Wall)
- Best Performance by an Actor in a Leading Role in a Dramatic Program or Mini-Series – Nomination (Michael Therriault)
- Best Performance by an Actor in a Featured Supporting Role in a Dramatic Program or Mini-Series – Nomination (Don McKellar)
- Best Achievement in Casting – Nomination (Carmen Kotyk)
- Best Photography in a Dramatic Program or Series – Nomination (Pierre Letarte)
- Best Achievement in Make-Up – Winner (Donald J. Mowat, Paula Fleet, Jane Meade)
- Best Sound in a Dramatic Program – Nomination (Rob Bryanton, Steve Hasiak, Evan Rust, Al Sherbin, Warren St. Onge)

== Streaming ==
As of 2017 the miniseries was released online on the Canada Media Fund Encore+ YouTube channel.

== See also ==
- Estevan riot
- The Greatest Canadian
- Co-operative Commonwealth Federation
- Trudeau
- Politics of Saskatchewan

== Other sources ==
- For the love of Tommy; Dave Margoshes. The Globe and Mail. Toronto, Ont.: May 10, 2005. pg. R.3
- Moose Jaw Times Herald. Moose Jaw, Sask.: March 21, 2006. pg. 2
