= Mac McCutcheon =

Mac McCutcheon may refer to:

- Mac McCutcheon (Canadian politician) (1912–1978), Canadian politician and farmer
- Mac McCutcheon (Alabama politician), member of the Alabama House of Representatives
