= Lambton East (federal electoral district) =

Former federal electoral district in Ontario, Canada

Ontario electoral district

Defunct federal electoral district
- Legislature: House of Commons
- District created: 1882
- District abolished: 1933
- First contested: 1882
- Last contested: 1930

Lambton East was a federal electoral district represented in the House of Commons of Canada from 1882 to 1935. It was located in the province of Ontario. This riding was created from Lambton riding.

The East Riding of the county of Lambton was initially defined to consist of the townships of Enniskillen, Brooke, Warwick and Bosanquet, the town of Petrolia, and the villages of Oil Springs, Alvinston, Watford, Arkona and Thedford.

In 1903, it was expanded to include the township of Euphemia and the town of Forest. In 1914, it was expanded to include the townships of Zone and Camden in the county of Kent.

In 1924, it was defined as consisting of the townships of Bosanquet, Warwick, Inniskillen, Brooke, Dawn and Euphemia in the County of Lambton, and the townships of Zone and Camden in the County of Kent.

The electoral district was abolished in 1933 when it was redistributed between Lambton West and Lambton—Kent ridings.

== Members of Parliament ==
This riding has elected the following members of Parliament:

Parliament	Years	Member	Party
Riding created from Lambton
5th	1882–1887	John Henry Fairbank	Liberal
6th	1887–1891	George Moncrieff	Conservative
7th	1891–1896	George Moncrieff	Conservative
8th	1896–1900	John Fraser	Liberal
9th	1900–1903†	Oliver Simmons	Conservative
9th	1904–1904	Joseph Elijah Armstrong	Conservative
10th	1904–1908	Joseph Elijah Armstrong	Conservative
11th	1908–1911	Joseph Elijah Armstrong	Conservative
12th	1911–1917	Joseph Elijah Armstrong	Conservative
13th	1917–1921	Joseph Elijah Armstrong	Government (Unionist)
14th	1921–1925	Burt Wendell Fansher	Progressive
15th	1925–1926	Joseph Elijah Armstrong	Conservative
16th	1926–1930	Burt Wendell Fansher	Progressive
17th	1930–1935	John Thomas Sproule	Conservative
Riding dissolved into Lambton West and Lambton—Kent

== Election results ==
1882 Canadian federal election
Party	Candidate	Votes
Liberal	John H. Fairbank	1,736
Unknown	J. A. McKenzie	1,569

1887 Canadian federal election
Party	Candidate	Votes
Conservative	George Moncrieff	2,488
Liberal	J. H. Fairbank	2,346

1891 Canadian federal election
Party	Candidate	Votes
Conservative	George Moncrieff	2,636
Liberal	Richard Stutt	2,070

1896 Canadian federal election
Party	Candidate	Votes
Liberal	John Fraser	2,144
Conservative	George Moncrieff	2,104
Protestant Protective	J. E. Armstrong	1,383

1900 Canadian federal election
Party	Candidate	Votes
Conservative	Oliver Simmons	2,637
Liberal	John Fraser	2,416

On Mr. Simmons' death, 11 November 1903:

By-election on 16 February 1904
Party	Candidate	Votes
Conservative	Joseph E. Armstrong	2,659
Liberal	Charles Jenkins	2,130

1904 Canadian federal election
Party	Candidate	Votes
Conservative	J. E. Armstrong	3,026
Liberal	James Cowan	2,565

1908 Canadian federal election
Party	Candidate	Votes
Conservative	Joseph E. Armstrong	2,921
Liberal	Charles Oliver Fairbank	2,461

1911 Canadian federal election
Party	Candidate	Votes
Conservative	Joseph Emanuel Armstrong	2,720
Liberal	Charles Oliver Fairbank	2,226

1917 Canadian federal election
Party	Candidate	Votes
Government (Unionist)	Joseph Emanuel Armstrong	4,239
Opposition (Laurier Liberals)	Neil McDougall	3,255

1921 Canadian federal election
Party	Candidate	Votes
Progressive	Burt Wendell Fansher	6,747
Conservative	Joseph Elijah Armstrong	5,752

1925 Canadian federal election
Party	Candidate	Votes
Conservative	Joseph E. Armstrong	5,611
Progressive	Burt Wendell Fansher	5,522
Liberal	John Ross Stirrett	1,061

1926 Canadian federal election
Party	Candidate	Votes
Progressive	Burt Wendell Fansher	6,891
Conservative	Joseph Emmanuel Armstrong	6,340

1930 Canadian federal election
Party	Candidate	Votes
Conservative	John Thomas Sproule	6,209
Progressive	Burt Wendell Fansher	6,196
Liberal	Charles Goodspeed Dunlop	153

== See also ==
- List of Canadian electoral districts
- Historical federal electoral districts of Canada
