= John Thomas Sproule =

Canadian politician

Member of Parliament for Lambton East
- In office July 1930 – October 1935
- Preceded by: Burt Wendell Fansher
- Succeeded by: riding dissolved

Personal details
- Born: John Thomas Sproule; 5 December 1876 Lambton County, Ontario, Canada
- Died: 10 November 1940 (aged 63)
- Party: Conservative
- Spouse(s): Hattie Woodward m. 14 February 1906
- Profession: farmer

John Thomas Sproule (5 December 1876 – 10 November 1940) was a Conservative member of the House of Commons of Canada. He was born in Lambton County, Ontario and became a farmer, a livestock dealer, and a businessman in the oil and cement industry.

Sproule served on the Oil Springs municipal council for 25 years and was the village's reeve for 11 years. He became a director of the Ontario Good Roads Association in 1924. Sproule was an unsuccessful candidate in the 1926 Ontario election.

He was first elected to Parliament at the Lambton East riding in the 1930 general election. After serving one term in the House of Commons, riding boundaries were changed and Sproule was a candidate for the new Lambton—Kent riding where he was defeated by Hugh MacKenzie in the 1935 election.
