= John Morrison (Saskatchewan politician) =

Canadian politician

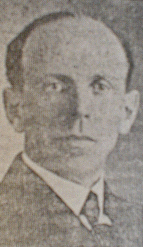
John Morrison after winning his candidate nomination in Weyburn

John Morrison (October 29, 1872, Mt. Charles, Ontario – November 6, 1950, Yellow Grass) was a Canadian politician.

Morrison was a House of Commons of Canada member for the Progressive Party of Canada from 1921 to 1925 representing the riding of Weyburn. At the time of his election he was a farmer residing in Yellow Grass, Saskatchewan.

He was defeated in the 1925 election and unsuccessfully ran in the 1926 election.

Parliament of Canada
Preceded by Richard Frederick Thompson	Member of Parliament for Weyburn; 1921-1925	Succeeded by Edward James Young
