= John Fraser (Ontario MP) =

Canadian politician

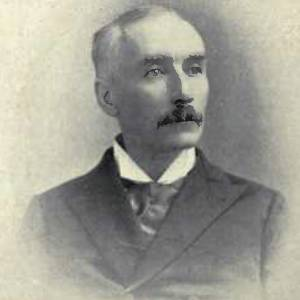

Member of the Canadian Parliament for Lambton East
- In office 1896–1900
- Preceded by: George Moncrieff
- Succeeded by: Oliver Simmons

Personal details
- Born: March 3, 1849 Inverness-shire, Scotland
- Died: February 1, 1928 (aged 78)
- Party: Liberal

John Fraser (March 3, 1849 – February 1, 1928) was a Canadian politician.

Born in Glen Urquhart, Inverness-shire, Scotland, Fraser came to Canada in 1852. He was mayor of Petrolia, Ontario from 1885 to 1889. He was elected to the House of Commons of Canada for the electoral district of Lambton East in the 1896 federal election. A Liberal, he was defeated in 1900. In 1902, he was appointed Postmaster of Petrolia.
