= John W. Burgess =

John W. Burgess may refer to:

- John Burgess (political scientist) (John William Burgess, 1844–1931), American political scientist
- John Wesley Burgess (1907–1990), Canadian member of Parliament
