= John Fairbank =

John Fairbank may refer to:

- John King Fairbank, American historian
- John Henry Fairbank, surveyor, oilman, inventor, banker, politician and fire chief in Ontario

== See also ==
- John Fairbanks, American landscape painter
