= Eric McKay =

Canadian politician

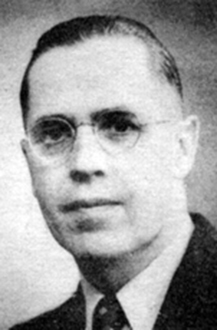

Member of Parliament for Weyburn
- In office June 1945 – June 1949
- Preceded by: Thomas Clement Douglas
- Succeeded by: riding dissolved

Personal details
- Born: Eric Bowness McKay; 26 November 1899 Summerside, Prince Edward Island
- Died: 20 February 1994 (aged 94) Regina, Saskatchewan
- Party: Co-operative Commonwealth Federation
- Spouse(s): Lydia Lang Gibson m. 29 September 1923
- Profession: principal, teacher

Eric Bowness McKay (26 November 1899 – 20 February 1994) was a Co-operative Commonwealth Federation member of the House of Commons of Canada. He was born in Summerside, Prince Edward Island and became a principal and teacher by career. He was also a school principal at Radville, Saskatchewan from 1925 to 1941.

He was first elected to Parliament at the Weyburn riding in the 1945 general election. After serving his only federal term, and after a change in electoral districts, the 20th Canadian Parliament, he was defeated in the 1949 federal election at Maple Creek riding by Irvin Studer of the Liberal party.
