= Edward James Young =

Canadian politician

Member of the Canadian Parliament for Weyburn
- In office 1925–1935
- Preceded by: John Morrison
- Succeeded by: Tommy Douglas

Personal details
- Born: January 16, 1878; Winnipeg, Manitoba, Canada
- Died: October 17, 1966 (aged 88); Toronto, Ontario, Canada
- Political party: Liberal
- Profession: farmer

Edward James Young (January 16, 1878 – October 17, 1966) was a Canadian politician and farmer. He was elected to the House of Commons of Canada in 1925 as a Member of the Liberal Party representing the riding of Weyburn. He was re-elected to Weyburn in 1926 and 1930 but defeated in 1935 by Tommy Douglas of the Co-operative Commonwealth Federation (CCF) in his first election.

He is portrayed in the 2006 CBC Television special Prairie Giant: The Tommy Douglas Story by Nicholas Campbell.
