= Lambton—Kent =

Former federal electoral district in Ontario, Canada

Ontario electoral district

Defunct federal electoral district
- Legislature: House of Commons
- District created: 1933
- District abolished: 1976
- First contested: 1935
- Last contested: 1974

Lambton—Kent was a federal electoral district in Ontario, Canada, that was represented in the House of Commons of Canada from 1935 to 1979. This riding was created in 1933 from parts of Kent, Lambton East and Lambton West ridings.

It was initially defined as consisting of:

- the part of the county of Lambton contained in the townships of Brooke, Dawn, Enniskillen, Euphemia, Sombra, and Warwick, including the town of Forest, Walpole Island, St. Ann Island and the other islands at the mouth of the St. Clair River; and
- the part of the county of Kent contained in the townships of the Gore of Chatham, Gore of Camden, Camden and Zone.

In 1947, it was redefined to exclude the village of Arkona (Lambton County); and the townships of Gore of Camden (Kent County).

In 1966, it was defined to consist of:

- the part of the County of Kent contained in the Townships of Camden, Chatham, Dover, Harwich, Howard, Orford and Zone;
- the part of the County of Lambton contained in the Townships of Brooke, Dawn, Euphemia, Enniskillen and Sombra;
- Walpole Island Indian Reserve No. 46.

The electoral district was abolished in 1976 when it was redistributed between Essex—Kent, Kent and Lambton—Middlesex ridings.

== Members of Parliament ==
This riding elected the following members of Parliament:

Parliament	Years	Member	Party
Riding created from Kent, Lambton East and Lambton West
18th	1935–1940	Hugh MacKenzie	Liberal
19th	1940–1945	Hugh MacKenzie	Liberal–Progressive
20th	1945–1949	Robert James Henderson	Progressive Conservative
21st	1949–1953	Hugh MacKenzie	Liberal
22nd	1953–1957	Hugh MacKenzie	Liberal
23rd	1957–1958	Ernest Campbell	Progressive Conservative
24th	1958–1962	Ernest Campbell	Progressive Conservative
25th	1962–1963	John Wesley Burgess	Liberal
26th	1963–1965	Mac McCutcheon	Progressive Conservative
27th	1965–1968	Mac McCutcheon	Progressive Conservative
28th	1968–1972	Mac McCutcheon	Progressive Conservative
29th	1972–1974	John Robert Holmes	Progressive Conservative
30th	1974–1979	John Robert Holmes	Progressive Conservative
Riding dissolved into Essex—Kent, Kent and Lambton—Middlesex

== Electoral history ==
1935 Canadian federal election
Party	Candidate	Votes
Liberal	Hugh MacKenzie	6,744
Conservative	John Thomas Sproule	5,064
Reconstruction	Burt Wendell Fansher	3,349

1940 Canadian federal election
Party	Candidate	Votes
Liberal–Progressive	Hugh MacKenzie	8,834
National Government	Calvert Stanley Stonehouse	6,089

1945 Canadian federal election
Party	Candidate	Votes
Progressive Conservative	Robert James Henderson	7,829
Liberal	Hugh MacKenzie	7,615
Co-operative Commonwealth	Joseph Wesley Kay	911

1949 Canadian federal election
Party	Candidate	Votes
Liberal	Hugh MacKenzie	9,674
Progressive Conservative	Robert James Henderson	8,189

1953 Canadian federal election
Party	Candidate	Votes
Liberal	Hugh MacKenzie	9,432
Progressive Conservative	Grant Stanley Dean	7,248

1957 Canadian federal election
Party	Candidate	Votes
Progressive Conservative	Ernest Campbell	9,745
Liberal	Hugh MacKenzie	7,752

1958 Canadian federal election
Party	Candidate	Votes
Progressive Conservative	Ernest Campbell	12,835
Liberal	Roy McBrayne	5,749

1962 Canadian federal election
Party	Candidate	Votes
Liberal	John Wesley Burgess	9,874
Progressive Conservative	Ernest Campbell	9,052
Social Credit	Lawrence Verheyden	521

1963 Canadian federal election
Party	Candidate	Votes
Progressive Conservative	Mac McCutcheon	9,520
Liberal	John Wesley Burgess	9,496
New Democratic	Cecil A. Cunningham	576
Social Credit	William E. Kellett	379

1965 Canadian federal election
Party	Candidate	Votes
Progressive Conservative	Mac McCutcheon	10,303
Liberal	Jack Beatty	9,413

1968 Canadian federal election
Party	Candidate	Votes
Progressive Conservative	Mac McCutcheon	14,460
Liberal	Len Lucier	11,094
New Democratic	Ray McGaffey	2,342

1972 Canadian federal election
Party	Candidate	Votes
Progressive Conservative	John Robert Holmes	16,306
Liberal	Gus Sonneveld	11,187
New Democratic	Mel Muxlow	2,970

1974 Canadian federal election
Party	Candidate	Votes
Progressive Conservative	John Robert Holmes	14,315
Liberal	Fred Reinhardt	12,483
New Democratic	Ron Howes	2,764

== See also ==
- List of Canadian electoral districts
- Historical federal electoral districts of Canada
