= Ernest Campbell =

Canadian politician (1903–1993)

Ernest John Campbell

Member of Parliament for Lambton—Kent
- In office June 1957 – June 1962
- Preceded by: Hugh Alexander Mackenzie
- Succeeded by: John Wesley Burgess

Personal details
- Born: 23 September 1903 Chatham Township, Ontario, Canada
- Died: 13 July 1993 (aged 89) Wallaceburg, Ontario, Canada
- Party: Progressive Conservative
- Profession: farmer

Ernest John Campbell (23 September 1903 – 13 July 1993) was a Progressive Conservative party member of the House of Commons of Canada. Born in Chatham Township, Ontario, he was a farmer by career.

He was first elected at the Lambton—Kent riding in the 1957 general election and re-elected there in the 1958 election. He was defeated by John Burgess of the Liberal party in the 1962 election.
