= Michael Therriault =

Canadian actor

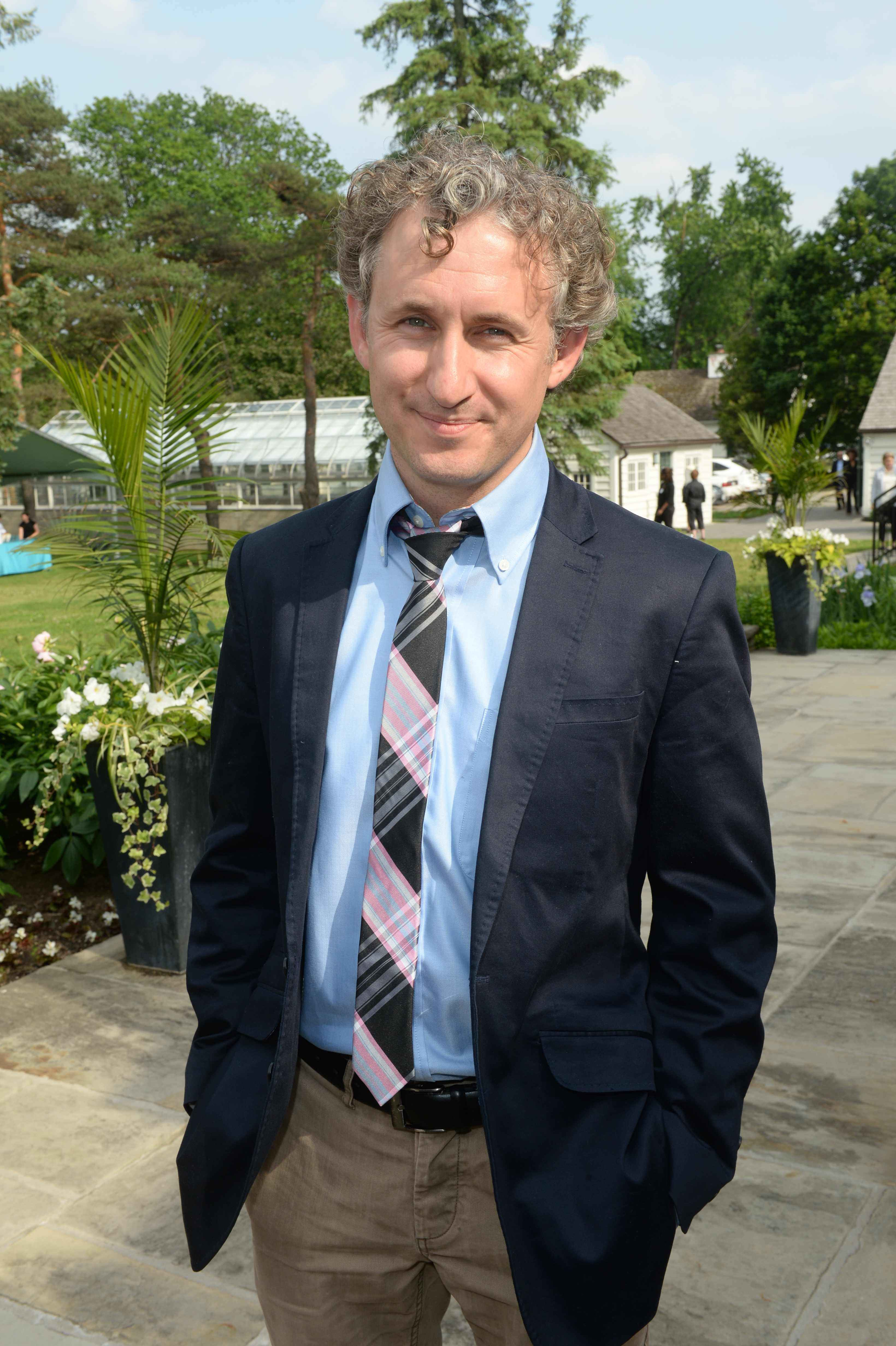
- Photography by: Tom Sandler, 2014
- Born: November 29, 1977 (age 48); Oakville, Ontario, Canada
- Occupation: Actor

Michael Therriault (born November 29, 1977) is a Canadian actor.

== Early life, family and education ==
Therriault graduated from Etobicoke School of the Arts in Toronto in 1992. He also attended Sheridan College in Oakville, Ontario. He was a member of the inaugural season of the Birmingham Conservatory for Classical Theatre Training in Stratford, Ontario.

== Career ==
After spending seven seasons at the Stratford Festival, Therriault left the classical repertoire theatre for musical theatre, starring as Leopold Bloom in the short-lived Toronto production of The Producers. For the performance Therriault won a Dora Award for Principal Actor in a Musical.

In 2006, Therriault portrayed Tommy Douglas in the CBC Television special Prairie Giant: The Tommy Douglas Story which earned him a nomination for a Gemini Award for Best Performance by an Actor in a Leading Role in a Dramatic Program or Mini-Series. The show received a total of nine nominations, including Best Writing in a Dramatic Program or Mini-Series and Best Dramatic Mini-Series. However, it was also heavily criticised for its historical inaccuracies, leading the CBC to pull it from future broadcasts.

While on Broadway in a revival of Fiddler on the Roof, Therriault got news that he had secured the role of Gollum in the Toronto premiere of The Lord of the Rings: The Musical. He received his second Dora for the performance. When it closed, he returned to Saskatchewan to film the made-for-television adaptation of Guy Vanderhaeghe's The Englishman's Boy. It aired in two parts on March 2 and 9, 2008, and was later available on DVD. In May 2007, The Lord of the Rings moved to London, with Therriault reprising the role he originated. The production closed on July 19, 2008, after 492 performances.

On October 20, 2008, Therriault took part in a tribute to the late Richard Monette, former artistic director of the Stratford Shakespeare Festival. Therriault performed in The Sound of Silence, a tribute to Paul Simon at the Bathurst Street Theatre in Toronto on April 20, 2009.

On April 27, 2009, it was announced that Therriault would appear as Irving Berlin, alongside Michael Boatman as Scott Joplin, in The Tin Pan Alley Rag, which centers around the imagined meeting of the two great musicians. The Tin Pan Alley Rag is presented by Roundabout Theatre Company in New York, June 12 to September 6, 2009.

Therriault has been a recurring actor in the Chucky franchise, having played the main human villain in the 7th film Cult of Chucky and two separate characters on episodes of the TV series Chucky.

He appeared as Dr. Doheny in the 2023 film Fitting In.

== Credits ==
=== Stratford Shakespeare Festival ===
- Peter Pan (2010)—Peter Pan
- Quiet in the Land (2003)—Yock Bauman
- Pericles, Prince of Tyre (2003)—Boult
- The Hunchback of Notre-Dame (2003)—Jehan
- The Two Noble Kinsmen (2002)—Doctor/Schoolmaster/Speaker
- King Henry VI, Reign of Terror (2002)—King Henry VI
- King Henry VI, Revolt in England (2002)—King Henry VI
- King Henry VI, Revenge in France (2002)—King Henry VI
- The Seagull (2001)—Konstantin'
- Henry V (2001)—Montjoy
- Twelfth Night (2001)—Sir Andrew Aguecheek
- As You Like It (2000)—Silvius
- Fiddler on the Roof (2000)—Motel
- Oscar Remembered (2000)—Lord Alfred Douglas
- The Alchemist (1999)—Drugger
- The Tempest (1999)—Ariel
- A Midsummer Night's Dream (1999)—Francis Flute
- The Miser (1998)—Cleante
- Much Ado About Nothing (1998)—George Seacole
- Julius Caesar (1998)—Lucius
- Filumena (1997)—Umbreto
- The Taming of the Shrew (1997)—Pietro
- Camelot (1997)—Mordred

=== Other ===
- Fitting In (2023) - Dr. Doheny
- Chucky (2021) - Nathan Cross (Season 1), Vice President Spencer Rhodes (Season 3)
- Cult of Chucky (2017) - Dr. Foley
- Me and My Girl, Shaw Festival (2017) - Bill Snibson
- The Bagel and Becky Show — Mayor Torgo, Old Man Jenkinsbot, Cyril (2016–2017)
- Halcyon — Blake Creighton (2016)
- Reign – Lord Castleroy, 2013–2017
- Stranded (2013) – Bruce Johns
- Parade, The Canadian Stage Company (2011) - Leo Frank
- Tin Pan Alley Rag, Roundabout Theatre Company (2009)—Irving Berlin
- Jitters, Manitoba Theatre Centre (2009)—George Ellsworth
- The Englishman's Boy, CBC Television (2008)—Harry Vincent
- The Lord of the Rings, Theatre Royal, Drury Lane, London (2007)—Gollum
- The Lord of the Rings, Princess of Wales Theatre, Toronto (2006)—Gollum
- Prairie Giant: The Tommy Douglas Story, CBC Television (2006)—Tommy Douglas
- The Producers, Canon Theatre, Toronto (2003) — Leo Bloom
- Murdoch Mysteries, Murdoch in Ladies Wear (2013) — John Craig Eaton

== See also ==
- Stratford Shakespeare Festival
