= Joseph Elijah Armstrong =

Canadian politician

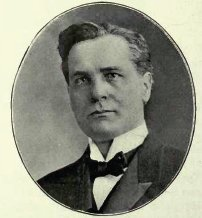

Member of the Canadian Parliament for Lambton East
- In office 1904–1921
- Preceded by: Oliver Simmons
- Succeeded by: Burt Wendell Fansher
- In office 1925–1926
- Preceded by: Burt Wendell Fansher
- Succeeded by: Burt Wendell Fansher

Personal details
- Born: November 9, 1866 York County, Canada West
- Died: January 31, 1931 (aged 64)
- Party: Conservative

Joseph Elijah Armstrong (November 9, 1866 – January 31, 1931) was a Canadian politician.

Born in York County, Canada West, Armstrong was educated in National School of Elocution and Oratory in Philadelphia, PA. An oil producer, a manufacturer and farmer, he first ran unsuccessfully as the Protestant Protective Association candidate for the House of Commons of Canada in the electoral district of Lambton East in the 1896 federal election. Switching to the Conservative Party, he was elected in a 1904 by-election. He served from 1904 to 1921 and from 1925 to 1926.
