= Oliver Simmons (Canadian politician) =

Canadian politician

Member of the Canadian Parliament for Lambton East
- In office 1900–1903
- Preceded by: John Fraser
- Succeeded by: Joseph Elijah Armstrong

Personal details
- Born: January 29, 1835 Chagrin Falls, Ohio
- Died: November 11, 1903 (aged 68)
- Party: Conservative

Oliver Simmons (January 29, 1835 – November 11, 1903) was a Canadian politician.

The son of Judge Solomon Simmons of Will County, Illinois, Simmons was born in Chagrin Falls, Ohio, United States. He was mayor of Petrolia, Ontario from 1892 to 1893. He was elected to the House of Commons of Canada for the electoral district of Lambton East. A Conservative, he died in office in 1903.
