= Robert James Henderson =

Canadian politician

Member of Parliament for Lambton—Kent
- In office June 1945 – June 1949
- Preceded by: Hugh MacKenzie
- Succeeded by: Hugh MacKenzie

Personal details
- Born: Robert James Henderson; 15 August 1877 Brooke Township, Ontario
- Died: 24 April 1953 (aged 75)
- Party: Progressive Conservative
- Spouse(s): Minnie Van Netter m. 26 December 1906
- Profession: Clerk, farmer, teacher

Robert James Henderson (15 August 1877 – 24 April 1953) was a Progressive Conservative party member of the House of Commons of Canada. He was born in Brooke Township, Ontario and became a municipal clerk, farmer and teacher by career.

Henderson attended high school in Watford, Ontario, then the London Normal School. He taught school from 1899 to 1940.

He was first elected to Parliament at the Lambton—Kent riding in the 1945 general election, defeating Liberal party incumbent Hugh MacKenzie. After serving one term, in the 20th Canadian Parliament, Henderson was defeated by MacKenzie in the 1949 election.
