= John Robert Holmes =

Canadian politician

Member of the Canadian Parliament for Lambton—Kent
- In office 1972–1979
- Preceded by: Mac McCutcheon
- Succeeded by: District was abolished in 1976.

Member of the Canadian Parliament for Kent
- In office 1979–1980
- Preceded by: District was created in 1976.
- Succeeded by: Maurice Bossy

Personal details
- Born: 3 September 1927 Tilbury, Ontario
- Died: 29 December 2011 (aged 84)
- Party: Progressive Conservative

John Robert Holmes (3 September 1927 – 29 December 2011) was a Canadian politician. First elected in the 1972 federal election, he served as a Progressive Conservative Member of Parliament representing the riding of Lambton—Kent. He was re-elected in the 1974 and 1979 elections, but was defeated in the 1980 election.
