= Mac McCutcheon (Canadian politician) =

Canadian politician

Maclyn Thomas "Mac" McCutcheon

Official 1968 portrait

Member of the Canadian Parliament for Lambton—Kent
- In office 1963–1972
- Preceded by: John Wesley Burgess
- Succeeded by: John Robert Holmes

Personal details
- Born: June 17, 1912 Croton, Ontario
- Died: May 19, 1978 (aged 65)
- Party: Progressive Conservative
- Spouse: Pauline Blanche McCutcheon
- Children: Charles William McCutcheon

Maclyn Thomas "Mac" McCutcheon (June 17, 1912 – May 19, 1978) was a Canadian politician and farmer.

Born in Croton, Ontario, he was elected to the House of Commons of Canada in the 1963 federal election as the Progressive Conservative Member of Parliament for Lambton—Kent, and re-elected in the 1965 and 1968 elections.

From 1972 to 1973 he was the Deputy House Leader of the Progressive Conservative Party while they were in opposition.
