= Shirley Douglas =

Canadian actress (1934–2020)

Shirley Douglas OC
- Born: Shirley Jean Douglas; April 2, 1934; Weyburn, Saskatchewan, Canada
- Died: April 5, 2020 (aged 86); Toronto, Ontario, Canada
- Education: Royal Academy of Dramatic Art
- Occupation: Actress
- Years active: 1954–2009
- Spouses: Timothy Emil Sick (m. 1957, divorced); Donald Sutherland (m. 1966; div. 1970)
- Children: 3, including Kiefer Sutherland
- Parent(s): Tommy Douglas, Irma Dempsey
- Relatives: Emil Sick (father-in-law, 1st marriage)

Shirley Jean Douglas OC (April 2, 1934 – April 5, 2020) was a Canadian actress. Her acting career combined with her family name made her recognizable in Canadian film, television, activism and national politics.

== Early life ==
Douglas was born on April 2, 1934, in Weyburn, Saskatchewan, the daughter of Irma May (née Dempsey; 1911–1995) and Tommy Douglas (1904–1986), the late Scottish-born Canadian statesman, Premier of Saskatchewan and the first leader of the federal New Democratic Party. She went to high school at Central Collegiate Institute in Regina, then at the age of 16 attended the Banff School of Fine Arts.

== Career ==
Douglas's acting career began in 1950 with a role in the Regina Little Theatre entry at the Dominion Drama Festival, where she won the best actress award. In 1952, she graduated from the Royal Academy of Dramatic Art in London and stayed in England for several years, performing in theatre and television before returning to Canada in 1957.

Douglas continued to work across stage, film, and television in Canada, the United Kingdom and the United States. Her roles included prominent feminist Nellie McClung, May Bailey in the television series Wind at My Back, Hagar Shipley in Margaret Laurence's The Stone Angel, and voice roles in popular science fiction series including The Silver Surfer and Flash Gordon.

In 1997, Douglas appeared on stage with her son Kiefer Sutherland at the Royal Alexandra Theatre and at the National Arts Centre in The Glass Menagerie. In 2000, she performed on stage in The Vagina Monologues. In 2006, she portrayed former U.S. Secretary of State Madeleine Albright in the ABC mini-series The Path to 9/11.

In 2003, for her contributions to the performing arts, she was named an Officer of the Order of Canada.

== Activism ==
Douglas moved to Los Angeles, California in 1967 after marrying actor Donald Sutherland. She became involved in the American Civil Rights Movement, the campaign against the Vietnam War, and later on behalf of immigrants and women. She helped establish the fundraising group "Friends of the Black Panthers".

In 1969, she was arrested in Los Angeles for Conspiracy to Possess Unregistered Explosives. According to a sworn statement by FBI agents, she allegedly attempted to purchase hand grenades from those FBI agents for the Black Panthers using a personal cheque. As her defence, she claimed the FBI was framing her by creating a crime where none existed prior to their involvement. Subsequently, the FBI denied her a work permit based on this allegation. Douglas, by then divorced from Sutherland, left the US in 1977. She and her three children moved to Toronto. The courts eventually dismissed the case and exonerated her.

Douglas co-founded the first chapter in Canada of the Performing Artists for Nuclear Disarmament.

As the daughter of Tommy Douglas, promoter of Medicare, she was one of Canada's activists in favor of taxpayer funded health care instead of privatised care. In the 2006 Canadian federal election, Douglas campaigned on behalf of the federal New Democratic Party and in 2012 she supported Brian Topp for that party's leadership.

== Personal life ==
Douglas was the mother of three children: Thomas Emil Sick from her marriage to Canadian prairie brewery heir Timothy Emil Sick in 1957, and twins (one being Kiefer Sutherland) from her second marriage to Canadian actor Donald Sutherland (1966–70).

Our jobs, we move around a great deal … and that is the reality that my children grew up with – is being left, and not happily.

By 2009, Douglas was in a wheelchair due to a degenerative spine condition that caused her severe pain.

== Death ==
Douglas died on April 5, 2020, due to complications from pneumonia, aged 86.

== Filmography ==
=== Film ===
Year	Title	Role	Notes
1955	Joe MacBeth	Patsy	Crime drama film directed by Ken Hughes
1962	Lolita	Mrs. Starch	
1983	The Wars	Mrs. Lawson	
1988	Dead Ringers	Laura	
1988	Shadow Dancing	Nicole	
1992	Passage of the Heart	Katherine Ward	
1992	The Shower	Marie	
1994	Mesmer	Duchess DuBarry	
1998	Barney's Great Adventure	Grandma Greenfield	
2000	Woman Wanted	Peg	
2000	The Law of Enclosures	Myra	
2000	Franklin and the Green Knight	Narrator	Video

=== Television ===
Year	Title	Role	Notes
1955	Rheingold Theatre	Molly Gaines	Episode: "The Long White Line"
1978	Nellie McClung	Nellie McClung	TV film
1982	Hangin' In	Mrs. Ricardo	Episode: "Barnum and Baby"
1986	Turning to Stone	Lena	TV film
1986	Loose Ends	Elder Seth's Wife	TV film
1987	Really Weird Tales	Edna Besley	TV film
1989	Alfred Hitchcock Presents	Monica Logan	Episode: "Driving Under the Influence"
1990–1991	Street Legal	Mayor Riley	Recurring role (4 episodes)
1992	Road to Avonlea	Miss Cavendish	Episode: "High Society"
1992	The Hat Squad		Episode: "Pilot"
1993	Shattered Trust: The Shari Karney Story	Vivian Karney (who bullied and abused her daughter Shari Karney)	TV film
1995	Redwood Curtain	Schyler Noyes	TV film
1995	Johnny's Girl	Mrs. Hardwick	TV film
1996–97	Flash Gordon	Additional Voices	25 episodes
1996–2001	Wind at My Back	May Bailey	Main role (65 episodes)
1998	Silver Surfer	Infectia (voice)	Unknown episodes
1998–2000	Franklin	Narrator	20 episodes
1999	Shadow Lake	Margaret Richards	TV film
2000	A House Divided	Elizabeth Dickson	TV film
2001	Made in Canada	Cybill Thornbush	Episode: "Beaver Creek Commercials"
2002	The Christmas Shoes	Ellen Layton	TV film
2005	Robson Arms	Pauline Dubois	Recurring role (4 episodes)
2005	Corner Gas	Peg	Episode: "Trees a Crowd"
2006	The Path to 9/11	Madeleine Albright	TV film
2008	Degrassi: The Next Generation	Professor Dunwoody	Episode: "Bust a Move: Part 2"

== Awards ==
- (2000) Gemini Award for her performance in the 1999 TV film Shadow Lake.
- (2001) Honorary degree of Doctor of Laws (LL.D) from Ryerson University.
- (2000) "Diamond Award" for her volunteerism, by the Variety Club an international charity for children in need
- (2002) Queen Elizabeth II Golden Jubilee Medal
- (2003) Officer of the Order of Canada (OC) - October 24, 2003.
- (2004) awarded a space on the Wall of Fame at the National Arts Centre in Ottawa
- (2004) received the "Distinguished Canadian Award" by the Seniors’ Education Centre at the University of Regina, an award first presented to her father almost 20 years before
- (2004) inducted with a star, on Canada's Walk of Fame in Toronto
- (2005) Honorary degree from Brandon University
- (2006) In November, Shirley gave an honorary lecture at Trent University
- (2009) Shirley Douglas was awarded the International Achievement Award at the 2009 Crystal Awards presented in Toronto by Women in Film & Television - Toronto, November 30, 2009
- (2012) Queen Elizabeth II Diamond Jubilee Medal – Toronto, February 28, 2012
