= John Wesley Burgess =

Canadian politician

Member of Parliament for Lambton—Kent
- In office 1962–1963
- Preceded by: Ernest John Campbell
- Succeeded by: Mac McCutcheon

Personal details
- Born: 19 May 1907 Wallaceburg, Ontario, Canada
- Died: 1 September 1990 (aged 83)
- Party: Liberal
- Profession: lawyer

John Wesley Burgess (19 May 1907 – 1 September 1990) was a Liberal party member of the House of Commons of Canada. He was born in Wallaceburg, Ontario and became a lawyer by career.

He was first elected at the Lambton—Kent riding in the 1962 general election. After serving his only term, the 25th Parliament, he was defeated in the 1963 federal election by Mac McCutcheon of the Progressive Conservative party.
