= Charles Oliver Fairbank (doctor) =

Canadian military officer (1858–1925)

- Born: July 21, 1858; Niagara Falls, Canada West
- Died: February 24, 1925 (aged 66); Santa Barbara, California, US
- Burial place: Petrolia, Ontario
- Military career
- Allegiance: Canada
- Branch: Canadian Forces
- Rank: Major
- Other work: reeve of Petrolia, warden of Petrolia(1914) and mayor of Petrolia (1919).

Major Charles Oliver Fairbank (1858–1925) was a Canadian oilman and military officer and M.D. who served in the First World War.

Fairbank was born July 21, 1858, in Niagara Falls, Welland County, Ontario. He was the son of famous Petrolia oil pioneer, John Henry Fairbank and grew up in the oil rush of Oil Springs and Petrolia. From the age of four to eight lived with his father in the Oil Springs log shanty. He was an oil operator who took the reins of all the family businesses in 1912 as the oil fields began declining. The businesses included oil production and a hardware store. The Fairbank family founded Fairbank Oil (still in operation) in 1861. He studied at Helmuth College in London, Ontario. Gentleman Cadet Fairbank was a member of the first class at Royal Military College of Canada, soon known as the "Old Eighteen." He entered 1st term on the 1st June 1876 and graduated in 1880. He graduated in 1891 with a degree of Doctor of Medicine from College of the Province of New York Known as King's College, now Columbia College. Due to his short stature, he was known as the little doctor. As part of the HQ staff, During World War I, he served as M.D. #1. The businesses included one of Canada's last private banks, which was in continuous operation from 1869 to 1924, when it closed its doors voluntarily. He was the oilman who hit Canada's first gas gusher in 1914 and developed oil fields both in Bothwell, Ontario, and in the Elk Hills in California.

== Personal life ==
An oilman, he was actually in California when the war broke out. Although he was 57, married with children, exceptionally wealthy, and on the road to retirement, his patriotism and dedication to his country brought him back to Canada to enlist to fight for King and Country. He lived in Petrolia, Ontario with his wife, Clara Mabel Fairbank (née Sussex) and their four boys: John Henry (15 years), Charles Oliver Fairbank (11 years), Henry Churchill (10 years) and Robert Theodore (8 months). He was an oil operator and M.D. He was Church of England.

== Military service ==
He was appointed Lieutenant, Royal Artillery 25 Aug 1880 and took more military training in England. He was appointed Lieutenant in the Active Militia, Province of Ontario 16 July 1880. He resigned his commission in June 1881. On May 12, 1898, he was promoted Major, Sixth "London" Field Battery in London, Ontario. Before the war, he served with the Canadian Artillery, a Unit of the Active Militia. He had served previously with the Royal Artillery. He belonged to the 6th Battery Militia and Royal Rothesay. He was 5'61/2 inches and 124 pounds and 57 years of age when he enlisted for World War I, on December 3, 1915. He was an oil operator and Medical Doctor. The military were not exactly keen to send a 57-year-old to the frontline, particularly one who was an experienced soldier. So he spent time training new recruits first in Canada, then in England. Although he wanted to go overseas and fight, he was told that he could not because he was too old. Eventually, Fairbank got his wish to fight on the front lines in France. He fought in the trenches at the battle of the Somme for the 70th Battalion, but the Canadian military had different plans for him. They sent Fairbank a letter asking him to return from the front, as they believed his skills would be better put to use training younger soldiers and supporting the war effort at home by giving speeches in support of the war effort, thus helping the army recruit new soldiers. He came back to Canada to give barnburner speeches around the region, including during a parade in Sarnia. He served in the Army in Canada, England and France during World War I with the 70th Battalion, 59th Battalion, 18th Battalion and Headquarters Staff M.D. #1. He initially served overseas as a Major with the 70th Battalion Canadian Expeditionary Forces from Aug 1915-September 1916. He embarked Halifax SS Lapland April 24, 1916, and disembarked in Liverpool on May 5/16. He transferred to the 39th Battalion on 11-7-16. He served with the 39th Battalion 2-8-16. He served in France with the 18th Battalion from 3 August 1916 to 10 October 1916. He served as Commanding Officer, Base Commandant in Boulogne 10/10/16. He left for England 10/10/16. He served in the War Office 2/10/16 where he was stuck off strength of 18th Battalion and returned for a post in Canada. He was transferred to HQ, Canadian Training Division Shornecliffe. He was awarded British War and Victoria Medals. He then transferred to the 15 Battalion (September 1916) then in London, Ontario (November 1916). As part of the HQ staff, he served as M.D. #1. As part of the General Demobilization, he was stuck off strength on 31 December 1918 in London, Ontario.

== Services to Canada ==
Fairbank was a powerful orator who contributed greatly to the war effort through his speeches. He gave barnburner speeches around the region, including during a parade in Sarnia. He was involved in many cenotaph dedications for fallen soldiers before he passed Feb 24, 1925. On 24 Sept. 1922, he unveiled the Petrolia Cenotaph, a granite soldier in Victoria Park, designed by Toronto sculptor, Emmanuel Hahn. He became a reeve, warden (1914) and the mayor of Petrolia (1919). He ran twice as a Liberal (Lambton East) in a federal election in October 1908 and September 1911.

== Legacy ==
Several properties associated with him are on the Petrolia Municipal Register of Cultural Heritage. e.g. Lancey Hall, his wife's former residence at 429 Ella St, Petrolia; Little Red Bank at 4245 Petrolia Line. His uniform was on display at the Lambton Heritage Museum until November 9, 2014. Petrolia & War http://www.petroliaheritage.com/military.html
