= John Henry Fairbank =

Canadian businessman & politician (1831–1914)

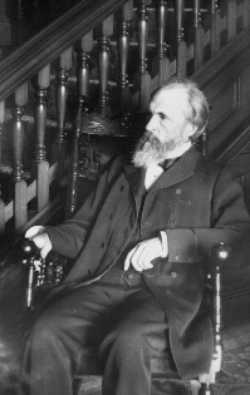
- Born: John Henry Fairbank; July 21, 1831; Rouse's Point, New York, United States
- Died: February 10, 1914 (aged 82); Petrolia, Lambton County, Ontario, Canada
- Occupations: Surveyor, Oilman, Inventor, Banker and Politician

John Henry Fairbank (July 21, 1831 - February 10, 1914) was variously a surveyor, oilman, inventor, banker, politician and fire chief in Lambton County, Ontario. Fairbank is best known for his invention of the jerker-line pumping system, which quickly spread across the world following its introduction in the mid-1860s. Fairbank Oil, established by Fairbank in 1861, is the oldest continually operating petroleum company, and the company's property, known as the "First Commercial Oil Field", is included in the List of National Historic Sites of Canada in Ontario.

== Biography ==
=== Early life ===
John Henry Fairbank was born near Rouse's Point, New York on July 21, 1831. He emigrated to Canada West in 1853, and two years later, he married Edna Chrysler in Niagara Falls. In 1861, Fairbank was hired by Julia Macklem to survey 100 acres of land in Oil Springs that she purchased from Charles Tripp and subdivide the property into 198 half-acre lots. After finishing the surveying job, Fairbank leased a half-acre plot of land from James Miller Williams and began to dig for oil, naming the well "Old Fairbank". Although the fluctuation in the price of oil in 1862-1863 nearly drove Fairbank to bankruptcy, his fortunes reversed in November 1863 when he netted $150 in profit in a single day. An upturn in the oil market in 1863-1864 further benefited Fairbank, and through steady reinvestment of his profits, he became the largest oil producer in Canada until the early 1900s. In 1865, Fairbank sold his half acre property at Oil Springs for $6000 and relocated to Petrolia, Ontario.

=== Jerker-line Pumping System ===
In the mid-1860s, Fairbank developed the jerker-line pumping system, which was ideally suited to the closely spaced, low-output oil wells in Lambton County. In this system, wooden rods connected to a single power source pumped dozens of wells at the same time. Before the invention of jerker-line system, a steam engine was required at each well. The resulting cost savings made it economically viable to pump hundreds of small oil wells that otherwise would have had to be abandoned and made it possible to work wells that were too deep and "too hard to work by manpower." Fairbank never patented the jerker-line system, thinking that the invention did not qualify for patent protection.

The jerker-line system quickly spread after its creation in Petrolia as Lambton oil drillers utilized the invention when opening up oil fields in Central Europe, Indonesia, Mexico, the Middle East and South America.

=== Career in Petrolia ===
After arriving in Petrolia in 1865, Fairbank opened a grocery and liquor store in partnership with Benjamin Van Tuyl. Quickly after its foundation, the store expanded into hardware and oil-well fittings. Above the store there was a room known as "Fairbank Hall", which served as a meeting place for oil producers before the construction of the Oil Exchange Hall in 1871. The store closed in November 2019.

In 1866, Fairbank led local efforts to build a spur line that would connect Petrolia to the Great Western Railway line at Wyoming. The producers sold the track to the railway company in late 1866 for the cost of construction and it quickly became one of the most profitable railway branches built in Canada due to the shipment of oil.

In 1869, Fairbank and Leonard Vaugh established Petrolia's first bank, known locally as "the little red bank" due to the colour of the building. Thirteen years later, Fairbank, Jacob Englehart and other businessmen from Petrolia formed the Crown Savings and Loan Company.

Throughout the 1870s, Fairbank took the lead in forming various producer groups that sought to limit production of oil to market demand and combat the growing power of oil refiners. Alongside 105 other oil producers, Fairbank joined the Lambton Crude Oil Partnership in June 1871, but the association was abandoned when the price of oil collapsed in 1873. Following the Lambton Crude Oil Partnerships' collapse, Fairbank and other oil producers formed the Home Oil Works Company. Fairbank was appointed President and Manager of Home Oil for eight years and the company constructed a refinery in Petrolia that was capable of refining 3,000 barrels of oil per week.

In 1892, Fairbank came into possession of a refinery in partnership with Samuel Rogers and Company of Toronto after its owners declared bankruptcy. The Fairbank, Rogers and Company refinery was valued at $50,000 and processed about 75,000 barrels of oil per year. In 1896, Fairbank and Rogers sold the refinery to the Bushnell Corporation, a Canadian subsidiary of Standard Oil.

Despite moving to Petrolia, Fairbank maintained an interest in the development of Oil Springs. In 1882, Fairbank purchased two-thirds interest in Henry C. Shannon's 138 acres of Oil land for $16,000. Between 1882 and 1887, Fairbank spend $32,000 on the development of the Shannon property. The Shannon property was one of Fairbank's most lucrative Oil sources, with almost half of his 30,000 barrels in 1885 coming from the site. By 1890, Fairbank purchased the remaining one-third share of the Shannon property for $22,500. The property is a key piece of Fairbank Oil Fields in Oil Springs today, owned and operated by Fairbank's great-grandson Charles O. Fairbank III.

Although Fairbank's business enterprises had always been closely related to the oil industry, he began to invest his surplus capital in a variety of enterprises in his later life. Many of these ventures ended in failure. In 1898, Fairbank entered into partnership with C. Dempsey and Company, a dry goods store. After three years the store failed and Fairbanks lost between $3000 and $5000. When the Petrolia Packing Company was forced into bankruptcy after a fire destroyed the building on October 31, 1905, Fairbank, one of its directors, likely lost between $5000 and $10,000. Fairbank also had an active interest in the Petrolia Wagon Works company. When the business required capital to pay off a series of bank loans, Fairbank agreed on December 29, 1908 to pay back any loans extended to the company. Despite the financial backing of Fairbank, the Wagon Works continued to lose money and eventually declared bankruptcy in 1922. The Fairbank estate paid $211,000 to settle the claims of the bank. Other endeavours were more profitable. In 1891, Fairbank took control of the Stevenson Boiler works plant after its founder, William Stevenson, fled to the United States to escape creditors. The plant employed 55 men and had a gross annual income of roughly $70,000. After nearly two decades of profitable operation, the Stevenson Boiler Works plant declined alongside the decline of the local oil industry and closed in 1918.

Fairbank was also involved with John W. Sifton in building the Canadian Pacific Railway west from Lakehead and he travelled to northwestern Ontario to oversee construction in 1875/1876.

=== Philanthropy ===
In 1872, Fairbank donated land on Railway Street to local Anglicans, enabling them to build a church. The church burned down in 1957, and in 1959, a new church was opened on the same site.

In 1901, Fairbank donated a portion of land adjoining Petrolia's town hall and purchased another piece of land for $8200 which he sold to the town for that amount. These pieces of land became Petrolia's market square.

=== Marriage and Children ===
Fairbank married Edna Chrysler, a granddaughter of a United Empire Loyalist in Niagara Falls in 1855. Together, they had six children, but only three lived past infancy:

Henry Addington Fairbank (June 7, 1856 - January 30, 1881)

Charles Oliver Fairbank (July 21, 1858- February 24, 1925)

Frank Irving Fairbank (died August 7, 1867)

Huron Hope Fairbank (June 2, 1868 - August 9, 1868)

Mary Edna (Fairbank) Rock (October 25, 1869 - June 28, 1944)

Ella Lenore Fairbank (December 6, 1871 - August 30, 1872)

=== Death ===
Fairbank's health began to decline in 1912, and he turned over active management of his affairs and company to his son Charles. Fairbank died on February 10, 1914. On February 12, 1914 Fairbank was laid to rest and businesses across Petrolia closed in tribute.

== Honours, decorations, awards and distinctions ==
In 1997, Fairbank was inducted into the Canadian Petroleum Hall of Fame for his success as an oil producer and his invention of the jerker-line pumping system.

== Politics ==
Fairbank served as reeve of Petrolia from 1868 to 1870, was chairman of the board of health and was chief of the Fire Department from 1874 to 1889. From 1882 to 1887, Fairbank represented Lambton East as a Liberal member of the House of Commons of Canada.

== Bibliography ==
Burr, Christina. Canada's Victorian Oil Town: The Transformation of Petrolia from a Resource Town into a Victorian Community. Montreal, Kingston, London and Ithaca: McGill-Queen's University Press, 2006.

Gray, Earle. Ontario's petroleum legacy : the birth, evolution and challenges of a global industry. Edmonton: Heritage Community Foundation, 2008.

Lauriston, Victor. "The Town of World Travelers: Maclean's: MAY 1, 1924." Maclean's | The Complete Archive, 1 May 1924, archive.macleans.ca/article/1924/5/1/the-town-of-world-travelers.

May, Gary. Hard Oiler!, The Story of Canadians' Quest for Oil at Home and Abroad. Toronto and Oxford: Dundurn Press, 1998.

Phelps, Charles. John Henry Fairbank of Petrolia (1831-1914): A Canadian Entrepreneur (Master's Thesis). Western University, 1965.

Report of the Royal Commission on the Mineral Resources of Ontario and Measures for their Development. Toronto: Warwick & Sons. 1890.

Ross, Victor. Petroleum in Canada. Toronto, 1914.

Whipp, Charles and Edward Phelps. Petrolia 1866-1966. Petrolia, Ontario: The Petrolia Advertiser-Topic and the Petrolia Centennial Committee, 1966.
