= George Moncrieff =

Canadian politician

George Moncrieff, KC (1842 – March 28, 1901) was a Scottish-born lawyer and political figure in Ontario, Canada. He represented Lambton East in the House of Commons of Canada from 1887 to 1896 as a Conservative member.

He was born in Musselburgh, the son of Presbyterian minister W.G. Moncrieff (author of a 1848 pamphlet that aroused a storm of controversy in Scottish religious circles). He was educated in Edinburgh. Moncrieff came to London, Canada West with his parents in 1854 and continued his education there. He studied law in London and Hamilton, was called to the Upper Canada bar in 1864 and set up practice in London, moving to Petrolia in 1866. In 1872, he married Isabella Thompson. Moncrieff served as reeve for Petrolia in 1867 and 1873 and mayor in 1874. He was town solicitor for Petrolia from 1875 to 1901 and was named Queen's Counsel in 1889.

Moncrieff was elected to the House of Commons in 1887 and was defeated when he ran for reelection in 1896.

He died in Petrolia at the age of 59.
