= Burnaby—Coquitlam =

Former federal electoral district in British Columbia, Canada

British Columbia electoral district

Defunct federal electoral district
- Legislature: House of Commons
- District created: 1952
- District abolished: 1966
- First contested: 1953
- Last contested: 1965

Burnaby—Coquitlam was a federal electoral district in British Columbia, Canada, that was represented in the House of Commons of Canada from 1953 to 1968. This riding was created in 1952 from parts of Burnaby—Richmond riding.

It was abolished in 1966 when it was redistributed into Burnaby—Seymour, Fraser Valley West and New Westminster ridings.

== Members of Parliament ==
Burnaby—Coquitlam
Parliament	Years	Member	Party
Riding created from Burnaby—Richmond
22nd	1953–1957	Erhart Regier	Co-operative Commonwealth
23rd	1957–1958	Erhart Regier	Co-operative Commonwealth
24th	1958–1961	Erhart Regier	Co-operative Commonwealth
24th	1961–1962	Erhart Regier	New Democratic
25th	1962–1962	Erhart Regier	New Democratic
25th	1962–1963	Tommy Douglas	New Democratic
26th	1963–1965	Tommy Douglas	New Democratic
27th	1965–1968	Tommy Douglas	New Democratic
Riding dissolved into Burnaby—Seymour, Fraser Valley West and New Westminster

== Election results ==
1965 Canadian federal election
Party	Candidate	Votes	%	±%
New Democratic	Tommy Douglas	22,553	52.93	+6.56
Liberal	Dick Hayes	12,090	28.37	–6.03
Social Credit	James Morris Kennedy	5,308	12.46	+2.93
Progressive Conservative	Mike Allen	2,662	6.25	–3.46
Total valid votes		42,613	99.16	
Total rejected ballots		361	0.84	+0.44
Turnout		42,974	77.22	–5.45
Eligible voters		55,653		
New Democratic hold		Swing		+6.30
Source: Library of Parliament

1963 Canadian federal election
Party	Candidate	Votes	%	±%
New Democratic	Tommy Douglas	19,067	46.37	–4.06
Liberal	Tom Kent	14,148	34.41	+9.58
Progressive Conservative	Lyn Morrow	3,990	9.70	+1.78
Social Credit	René Jules Gamache	3,917	9.53	–6.80
Total valid votes		41,122	99.60	
Total rejected ballots		167	0.40	+0.40
Turnout		41,289	82.67	–
Eligible voters		49,944		
New Democratic hold		Swing		–6.82
Source: Library of Parliament

Canadian federal by-election, October 22, 1962 On the resignation of Erhart Regier, August 20, 1962
Party	Candidate	Votes	%	±%
New Democratic	Tommy Douglas	16,313	50.43	+0.52
Liberal	Warren R. Clark	8,029	24.82	+0.32
Social Credit	Rene Jules Gamache	5,282	16.33	+4.37
Progressive Conservative	Eric Greenwood	2,562	7.92	–5.72
Independent	George Burnham	162	0.50	–
Total valid votes		32,348	100.00	
Total rejected ballots		–		
Turnout		32,348	–	
Eligible voters		–		
New Democratic hold		Swing		+0.42
Source: Library of Parliament

1962 Canadian federal election
Party	Candidate	Votes	%	±%
New Democratic	Erhart Regier	19,050	49.91	+6.83
Liberal	Warren R. Clark	9,351	24.50	+12.72
Progressive Conservative	Maurice Dorfman	5,206	13.64	–24.45
Social Credit	David C. King	4,564	11.96	+4.91
Total valid votes		38,171	99.24	
Total rejected ballots		291	0.76	+0.11
Turnout		38,462	80.04	+3.99
Eligible voters		48,051		
New Democratic hold		Swing		–2.94
Source: Library of Parliament

1958 Canadian federal election
Party	Candidate	Votes	%	±%
Co-operative Commonwealth	Erhart Regier	12,917	43.08	+4.30
Progressive Conservative	Murray Morrison	11,422	38.09	+20.56
Liberal	Robert James Cooper	3,533	11.78	–5.15
Social Credit	Morris Perrett	2,113	7.05	–19.71
Total valid votes		29,985	99.36	
Total rejected ballots		194	0.64	–0.21
Turnout		30,179	76.05	–0.19
Eligible voters		39,681		
Co-operative Commonwealth hold		Swing		–8.13
Source: Library of Parliament

1957 Canadian federal election
Party	Candidate	Votes	%	±%
Co-operative Commonwealth	Erhart Regier	10,947	38.78	+1.17
Social Credit	Clarence Gerhart	7,552	26.76	+0.82
Progressive Conservative	Jane Kilmer	4,949	17.53	+6.49
Liberal	Fred Philps	4,778	16.93	–5.21
Total valid votes		28,226	99.15	
Total rejected ballots		243	0.85	+0.35
Turnout		28,469	76.24	+11.13
Eligible voters		37,339		
Co-operative Commonwealth hold		Swing		+0.17
Source: Library of Parliament

1953 Canadian federal election
Party	Candidate	Votes	%	±%
Co-operative Commonwealth	Erhart Regier	7,232	37.62	–
Social Credit	René Jules Gamache	4,987	25.94	–
Liberal	George Campbell Bastedo	4,256	22.14	–
Progressive Conservative	John E. Milne	2,124	11.05	–
Labor–Progressive	Alexander Kucher	627	3.26	–
Total valid votes		19,226	99.49	
Total rejected ballots		98	0.51	–
Turnout		19,324	65.11	–
Eligible voters		29,679		
Co-operative Commonwealth notional gain		Swing		–
Source: Library of Parliament

== See also ==
- List of Canadian electoral districts
- Historical federal electoral districts of Canada
