= Weyburn (federal electoral district) =

Former federal electoral district in Saskatchewan, Canada

Weyburn was a federal electoral district in Saskatchewan, Canada, that was represented in the House of Commons of Canada from 1917 to 1949. This riding was created in 1914 from parts of Assiniboia, Qu'Appelle and Regina ridings. It was Tommy Douglas' riding from 1935 until he left Parliament to enter provincial politics in 1944.

It was abolished in 1947 when it was redistributed into Moose Mountain, Assiniboia and Qu'Appelle ridings.

== Election results ==
1917 Canadian federal election
Party	Candidate	Votes
Government (Unionist)	THOMPSON, Richard Frederick	acclaimed

1921 Canadian federal election
Party	Candidate	Votes
Progressive	MORRISON, John	6,635
Conservative	THOMPSON, Richard Frederick	2,539

1925 Canadian federal election
Party	Candidate	Votes
Liberal	YOUNG, Edward James	4,807
Progressive	MORRISON, John	2,162
Conservative	HILLIAR, Thomas Henry	1,957

1926 Canadian federal election
Party	Candidate	Votes
Liberal	YOUNG, Edward James	6,068
Progressive	MORRISON, John	3,493

1930 Canadian federal election
Party	Candidate	Votes
Liberal	YOUNG, Edward James	7,259
Conservative	MORLEY, John Rennie	5,723
Progressive	MCMANUS, James Hamilton	1,433

1935 Canadian federal election
Party	Candidate	Votes
Co-operative Commonwealth	DOUGLAS, Thomas Clement	7,280
Liberal	YOUNG, Edward James	6,979
Communist	BEISCHEL, George	1,557
Social Credit	FLETCHER, Morton Allison	362

1940 Canadian federal election
Party	Candidate	Votes
Co-operative Commonwealth	DOUGLAS, Thomas Clement	8,509
Liberal	METHERAL, Thomas Niddrie	7,554
United Reform	HILTON, John Harrison	269

1945 Canadian federal election
Party	Candidate	Votes
Co-operative Commonwealth	MCKAY, Eric Bowness	8,174
Liberal	METHERAL, Thomas Niddrie	5,962
Progressive Conservative	VENNARD, Elwood Haig	1,739
Social Credit	THAUBERGER, Joseph A.	980

== See also ==
- List of Canadian electoral districts
- Historical federal electoral districts of Canada
