= Richard Frederick Thompson =

Canadian politician

Richard Frederick Thompson (June 2, 1873 – September 25, 1949) was a farmer and political figure in Saskatchewan, Canada. He represented Weyburn in the House of Commons of Canada from 1917 to 1921 as a Unionist Party member.

He was born in Grey County, Ontario, the son of Robert Thompson and the former Miss Hunter, and was educated there. He owned a farm in Weyburn, Saskatchewan. Thompson was defeated when he ran for reelection in 1921. He died in Vancouver, British Columbia at the age of 76.
