= Hugh MacKenzie =

Canadian politician

Member of Parliament for Lambton—Kent
- In office October 1935 – June 1945
- Preceded by: riding created
- Succeeded by: Robert James Henderson

Member of Parliament for Lambton—Kent
- In office June 1949 – June 1957
- Preceded by: Robert James Henderson
- Succeeded by: Ernest Campbell

Personal details
- Born: Hugh Alexander MacKenzie; 7 August 1882 Warwick, Ontario, Canada
- Died: 8 January 1970 (aged 87)
- Party: Liberal; Liberal-Progressive
- Profession: farmer

Hugh Alexander MacKenzie (7 August 1882 – 8 January 1970) was a member of the House of Commons of Canada. He was born in Warwick, Ontario and became a farmer.

He was first elected as a Liberal party candidate at the Lambton—Kent riding in the 1935 general election then re-elected as a Liberal-Progressive candidate in 1940. Returning to the Liberal party, MacKenzie was defeated at Lambton—Kent for one term by Robert James Henderson of the Progressive Conservative party in the 1945 election. MacKenzie unseated Henderson in the next election in 1949 then was re-elected in 1953. After his final federal term in office, the 22nd Canadian Parliament, MacKenzie was defeated by Ernest Campbell in the 1957 election.
