= Erhart Regier =

Canadian politician

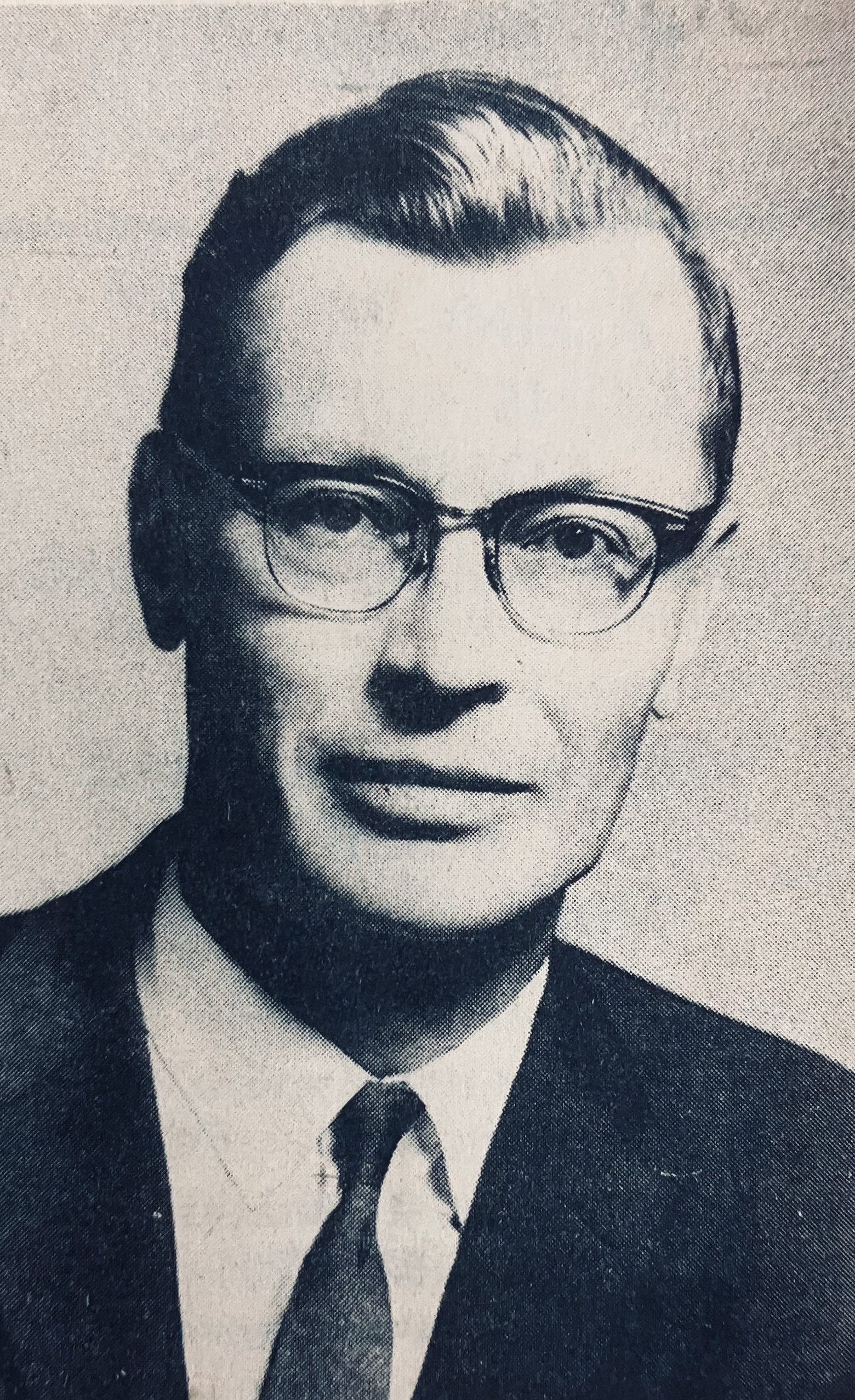

Member of Parliament for Burnaby—Coquitlam
- In office November 12, 1953 – August 20, 1962
- Preceded by: District created
- Succeeded by: Tommy Douglas

Personal details
- Born: January 15, 1916 Laird, Saskatchewan, Canada
- Died: October 22, 1976 (aged 60) New Westminster, British Columbia, Canada
- Party: CCF/NDP
- Occupation: Teacher

Erhart Regier (January 15, 1916 – October 22, 1976) was a Canadian politician, who represented the electoral district of Burnaby—Coquitlam in the House of Commons from 1953 to 1962.

Regier was born in Laird, Saskatchewan to a Mennonite family. After working as a teacher and founding a cooperative association general store, he was elected as a Co-operative Commonwealth Federation (CCF) MP in the 1953 election. When the CCF was succeeded by the New Democratic Party (NDP) in 1961, he joined its caucus. The following year, Regier resigned his House seat on August 20, 1962 so that federal NDP leader Tommy Douglas could contest a safe seat in a by-election. He then stood as the NDP's candidate in Fraser Valley in the 1963 election, in Algoma West in the 1965 election and in Prince George—Peace River in the 1968 election, but was not re-elected to the House in any of the later elections.

Regier was the first Mennonite elected to the Canadian Parliament. In his maiden speech, he invoked his Mennonite background as part of an appeal for the abolition of the Canadian military, arguing that Canada's defence budget should instead go to the United Nations' military operations budget and the other half to humanitarian aid. However, Regier was also critical of his Mennonite community, which he perceived as being overly-reluctant to participate in the Canadian political process. After retiring from Parliament, he wrote in the Canadian Mennonite that, in liberal democracies like Canada, “our [Mennonite] leaders of the past have failed to meet their responsibilities in that they clung to the old attitudes instead of attempting to participate and to help the children of God.”
