= Tommy Douglas =

Premier of Saskatchewan from 1944 to 1961

The Reverend and Honourable Tommy Douglas PC CC SOM
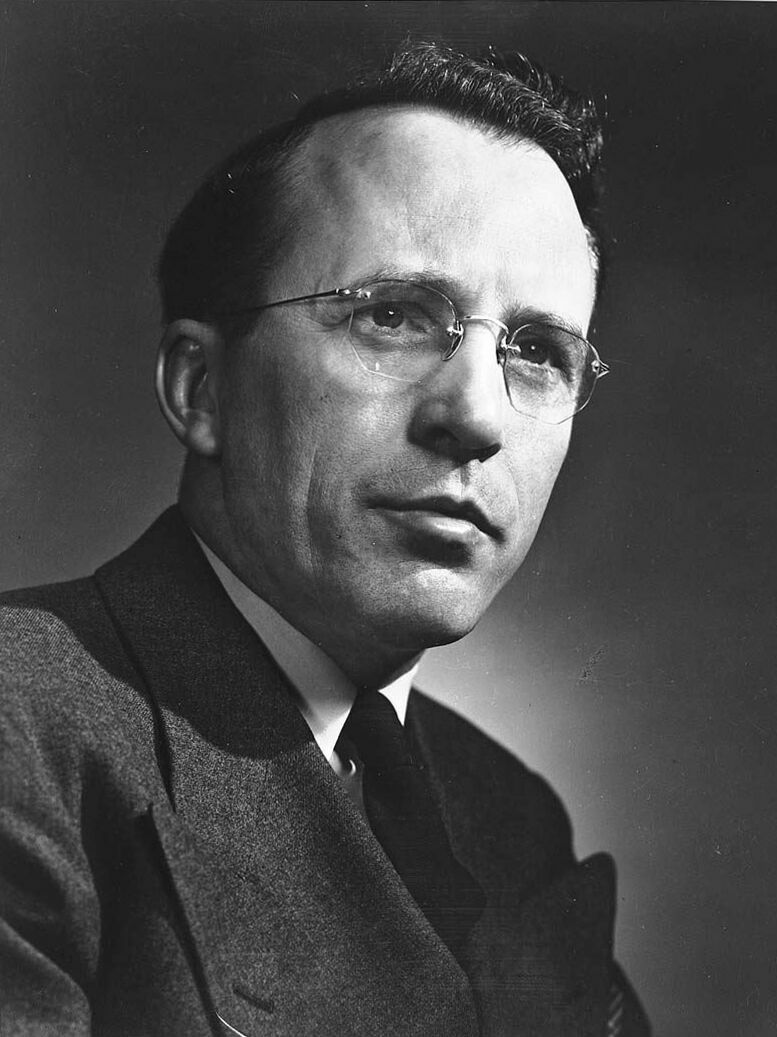
- Douglas, c. 1950s

Leader of the New Democratic Party
- In office 3 August 1961 – 24 April 1971
- Preceded by: Hazen Argue (as leader of the CCF)
- Succeeded by: David Lewis

7th Premier of Saskatchewan
- In office 10 July 1944 – 7 November 1961
- Monarchs: George VI; Elizabeth II
- Lieutenant Governor: Archibald Peter McNab; Thomas Miller; Reginald J. M. Parker; John M. Uhrich; William John Patterson; Frank Lindsay Bastedo
- Preceded by: William John Patterson
- Succeeded by: Woodrow Lloyd

Leader of the Saskatchewan CCF
- In office 17 July 1942 – 3 November 1961
- Preceded by: John Brockelbank
- Succeeded by: Woodrow Lloyd
Parliamentary constituencies
Member of Parliament for Nanaimo—Cowichan—The Islands
In office 10 February 1969 – 22 May 1979
Preceded by	Colin Cameron
Succeeded by	Riding dissolved
Member of Parliament for Burnaby—Coquitlam
In office 22 October 1962 – 25 June 1968
Preceded by	Erhart Regier
Succeeded by	Riding dissolved
Member of the Legislative Assembly of Saskatchewan for Weyburn
In office 15 March 1944 – 7 November 1961
Preceded by	George Crane
Succeeded by	Junior Staveley
Member of Parliament for Weyburn
In office 14 October 1935 – 15 June 1944
Preceded by	Edward James Young
Succeeded by	Eric Bowness McKay

Personal details
- Born: Thomas Clement Douglas; 20 October 1904 Camelon, Falkirk, Scotland
- Died: 24 February 1986 (aged 81) Ottawa, Ontario, Canada
- Resting place: Beechwood Cemetery, Ottawa
- Party: CCF (1935–1961); NDP (1961–1986)
- Spouse: Irma Dempsey (m. 1930)
- Children: 2, including Shirley Douglas
- Relatives: Kiefer Sutherland (grandson); Sarah Sutherland (great-granddaughter)
- Education: Brandon University; McMaster University; University of Chicago
- Profession: Baptist minister

Thomas Clement Douglas PC CC SOM (20 October 1904 – 24 February 1986) was a influential Scottish-born Canadian politician who served as the seventh premier of Saskatchewan from 1944 to 1961 and leader of the New Democratic Party from 1961 to 1971. A Baptist minister, he was elected to the House of Commons of Canada in 1935 as a member of the Co-operative Commonwealth Federation (CCF). He left federal politics to become leader of the Saskatchewan Co-operative Commonwealth Federation and then the seventh Premier of Saskatchewan. His government introduced the continent's first single-payer, universal health care program.

After setting up Saskatchewan's universal healthcare program, Douglas stepped down and ran to lead the newly formed federal New Democratic Party (NDP), the successor party of the national CCF. He was elected as its first federal leader in 1961. Although Douglas never led the party to government, through much of his tenure the party held the balance of power in the House of Commons. He was noted as being the main opposition to the imposition of the War Measures Act during the 1970 October Crisis. He resigned as leader the next year but remained as a Member of Parliament until 1979.

Douglas was awarded many honorary degrees, and a foundation was named for him and his political mentor M. J. Coldwell in 1971. In 1981, he was invested into the Order of Canada, and he became a member of Canada's privy council in 1984, two years before his death. In 2004, a CBC Television program named Tommy Douglas "The Greatest Canadian", based on a Canada-wide, viewer-supported survey.

== Early life ==
Thomas Clement Douglas was born in 1904 in Falkirk, the son of Annie (née Clement) and Thomas Douglas, an iron moulder who fought in the Boer War. In 1910 at age 7, his family immigrated to Canada, where they settled in Winnipeg. Shortly before he left the United Kingdom, Douglas fell and injured his right knee. Osteomyelitis set in and he underwent a number of operations in Scotland in an attempt to cure the condition. Later in Winnipeg, the osteomyelitis flared up again, and Douglas was sent to hospital. Doctors there told his parents his leg would have to be amputated; however, a well-known orthopedic surgeon took interest and agreed to treat him for free if his parents allowed medical students to observe. After several operations, Douglas's leg was saved. This experience convinced him that health care should be free to all. Many years later, Douglas told an interviewer, "I felt that no boy should have to depend either for his leg or his life upon the ability of his parents to raise enough money to bring a first-class surgeon to his bedside."

During World War I (aged 12 to 15), the family went back to Glasgow. They returned to Winnipeg in late 1918, in time for Douglas to witness the Winnipeg general strike. From a rooftop vantage point on Main Street, he witnessed the police charging the strikers with clubs and guns, and a streetcar being overturned and set on fire. He also witnessed the Royal Canadian Mounted Police (RCMP) shoot and kill one of the workers. This incident influenced Douglas later in life by cementing his commitment to protect fundamental freedoms in a Bill of Rights when he was premier of Saskatchewan.

In 1920, at the age of 15, Douglas began amateur boxing at the One Big Union gym in Winnipeg. Weighing 135 pounds (61 kg), he won the 1922 Lightweight Championship of Manitoba after a six-round fight. Douglas sustained a broken nose, a loss of some teeth, and a strained hand and thumb. He held the title the following year.

In 1930, Douglas married Irma Dempsey, a music student at Brandon College. They had one daughter, actress Shirley Douglas, and they later adopted a second daughter, Joan, who became a nurse. His daughter, Shirley, married actor Donald Sutherland; through Shirley, Kiefer Sutherland is Tommy Douglas' grandson.

== Education ==
Douglas started elementary school in Winnipeg. He completed his elementary education after returning to Glasgow. He worked as a soap boy in a barber shop, rubbing lather into tough whiskers, then dropped out of high school at 13 after landing a job in a cork factory. The owner offered to pay Douglas's way through night school so that he could learn Portuguese and Spanish, languages that would enable him to become a cork buyer. However, the family returned to Winnipeg when the war ended and Douglas entered the printing trades. He served a five-year apprenticeship and worked as a Linotype operator finally acquiring his journeyman's papers, but decided to return to school to pursue his ambition to become an ordained minister.

=== Brandon University ===
In 1924, the 19-year-old Douglas enrolled at Brandon College, a Baptist school affiliated with McMaster University, to finish high school and study theology. During his six years at the college, he was influenced by the Social Gospel movement, which combined Christian principles with social reform. Liberal-minded professors at Brandon encouraged students to question their fundamentalist religious beliefs. Christianity, they suggested, was just as concerned with the pursuit of social justice as it was with the struggle for individual salvation. Douglas took a course in socialism at Brandon and studied Greek philosophy. He came first in his class during his first three years, then competed for gold medals in his last three with a newly arrived student named Stanley Knowles. Both later became ministers of religion and prominent left-wing politicians. Douglas was extremely active in extracurricular activities. Among other things, he became a champion debater, wrote for the school newspaper and participated in student government winning election as Senior Stick, or president of the student body, in his final year.

Douglas financed his education at Brandon College by conducting Sunday services at several rural churches for $15 a week. A shortage of ordained clergy forced smaller congregations to rely on student ministers. Douglas reported later that he preached sermons advocating social reform and helping the poor: "[T]he Bible is like a bull fiddle ... you can play almost any tune you want on it." He added that his interest in social and economic questions led him to preach about "building a society and building institutions that would uplift mankind". He also earned money delivering entertaining monologues and poetry recitations at church suppers and service club meetings for $5 a performance. During his second and third years at the college, he preached at a Presbyterian church in Carberry, Manitoba. There he met a farmer's daughter named Irma Dempsey who would later become his wife.

=== MA thesis on eugenics ===
Douglas graduated from Brandon College in 1930 and completed his Master of Arts degree in sociology at McMaster University in 1933. His thesis, "The Problems of the Subnormal Family", endorsed eugenics. The thesis proposed a system that would have required couples seeking to marry to be certified as mentally and morally fit. Those deemed to be "subnormal", because of low intelligence, moral laxity, or venereal disease would be sent to state farms or camps, while those judged to be mentally defective or incurably diseased would be sterilized.

Douglas rarely mentioned his thesis later in his life, and his government never enacted eugenics policies, though two official reviews of Saskatchewan's mental health system recommended such a program when he became premier and minister of health. As premier, Douglas opposed the adoption of eugenics laws. By the time Douglas took office in 1944, many people questioned eugenics due to Nazi Germany's embrace of it in its effort to create a "master race". Instead, Douglas implemented vocational training for the mentally handicapped and therapy for those suffering from mental disorders. (Note: Two Canadian provinces, Alberta and British Columbia, had eugenics legislation that imposed forced sterilization. Alberta's law was first passed in 1928, with government-mandated sterilizations (without consent of parent or guardian) being allowed starting in 1937, while BC enacted its legislation in 1933. It was not until 1972 that both provinces repealed the legislation. (See Compulsory sterilization in Canada))

=== PhD research in Chicago ===
In the summer of 1931, Douglas continued his studies in sociology at the University of Chicago. He never completed his PhD thesis but was deeply disturbed by his field work in the Depression-era "jungles" or hobo camps where about 75,000 transients sheltered in lean-tos venturing out by day to beg or to steal. Douglas interviewed men who once belonged to the American middle class—despondent bank clerks, lawyers and doctors. Douglas said later, "There were little soup kitchens run by The Salvation Army and the churches ... In the first half-hour they'd be cleaned out. After that there was nothing ... It was impossible to describe the hopelessness."

Douglas was disturbed that members of the Socialist Party sat around quoting Marx and Lenin, waiting for a revolution while refusing to help the destitute. Douglas said: "That experience soured me with absolutists ... I've no patience with people who want to sit back and talk about a blueprint for society and do nothing about it."

== From school to pulpit to politics ==
Two months after Douglas graduated from Brandon College, he married Irma Dempsey, and the two moved to the town of Weyburn, Saskatchewan, where he became an ordained minister at the Calvary Baptist Church. Irma was 19, while Douglas was 25. With the onset of the Depression, Douglas became a social activist and joined the new Co-operative Commonwealth Federation (CCF) political party.

== Federal politics ==
Douglas was elected to the House of Commons of Canada in the 1935 federal election.

During the September 1939 special House of Commons debate on entering the war, Douglas, who had visited Nazi Germany in 1936 and was disgusted by what he saw, supported going to war against Hitler. He was not a pacifist, unlike his party's leader, J. S. Woodsworth, and stated his reasons:

If you accept the completely absolutist position of the pacifist, then you are saying that you are prepared to allow someone else who has no such scruples to destroy all the values you've built up. This is what I used to argue with Mr. Woodsworth ... if you came to a choice between losing freedom of speech, religion, association, thought, and all the things that make life worth living, and resorting to force, you'd used force. What you have internationally is what you have within a nation. You must have law and order, and you must have the necessary military means to enforce that law and order.

The CCF National Council eventually adopted Douglas and Coldwell's position, but they did not admonish Woodsworth for his pacifist stand and allowed him to put it forward in the House. Douglas assisted Woodsworth, during his leader's speech, by holding up the pages and turning them for him, even though he disagreed with him. Woodsworth had suffered a stroke earlier in the year and he needed someone to hold his notes, and Douglas still held him in very high regard, and dutifully assisted his leader.

After the outbreak of World War II, Douglas ran for re-election in 1940. He ran in close association with Agnes McPhail and Dorise Nielsen. He was re-elected as the MP for the Weyburn riding.

Douglas enlisted in the wartime Canadian Army. He volunteered for overseas service but a medical examination turned up his old leg problems. Douglas stayed behind in Canada, and the Grenadiers moved out to take up garrison duty in Hong Kong. If not for that ailment, he would likely have been with the regiment when its members were killed or captured at Hong Kong in December 1941.

== Premier of Saskatchewan ==
The Leader-Post announces the CCF victory, 1944

Despite being a federal Member of Parliament and not an MLA, Douglas was elected the leader of the Saskatchewan CCF in 1942 when he ran against the incumbent leader, George Hara Williams. He resigned from the House of Commons on 1 June 1944, two weeks into the 1944 provincial election campaign.

He led the CCF to power in 15 June 1944 provincial election, winning 47 of 52 seats in the Legislative Assembly of Saskatchewan, and thus forming the first social democratic government in not only Canada but all of North America.

Most of his government's pioneering innovations came about during its first term, including:

- the creation of the publicly owned Saskatchewan Power Corporation, successor to the Saskatchewan Electrical Power Commission, which began a long program of extending electrical service to isolated farms and villages;
- the creation of Canada's first publicly owned automotive insurance service, the Saskatchewan Government Insurance Office;
- the creation of a large number of crown corporations, many of which competed with existing private sector interests;
- legislation that allowed the unionization of the public service;
- a program to offer taxpayer-funded hospital care to all citizens—the first in North America.
- passage of the Saskatchewan Bill of Rights, legislation that broke new ground as it protected both fundamental freedoms and equality rights against abuse not only by government actors but also on the part of powerful private institutions and persons. (The Saskatchewan Bill of Rights preceded the adoption of the Universal Declaration of Human Rights by the United Nations by 18 months.)

Douglas and the Saskatchewan CCF went on to win five straight majority victories in all subsequent Saskatchewan provincial elections up to 1960. As premier, Douglas attended the coronation of Elizabeth II in June 1953.

Douglas was the first head of any government in Canada to call for a constitutional bill of rights. Douglas did this at a federal-provincial conference in Quebec City in January 1950. No one in attendance at the conference supported him in this. Ten years later, Premier Jean Lesage of Quebec joined with Douglas at a First Ministers' Conference in July 1960 in advocating for a constitutional bill of rights. Thus, respectable momentum was given to the idea that finally came to fruition, on 17 April 1982, with the proclamation of the Canadian Charter of Rights and Freedoms.

Thanks to a booming postwar economy and the prudent financial management of provincial treasurer Clarence Fines, the Douglas government slowly paid off the huge public debt left by the previous Liberal government, and achieved a balanced budget and even yearly surpluses. The improved economy and a federal government promise in 1959 to give more tax money for medical care, allowed Douglas's most notable achievement, the adoption of universal health care in 1961.

=== Medicare ===
Douglas's number one concern was the creation of Medicare. He introduced medical insurance reform in his first term, and gradually moved the province towards universal medicare near the end of his last term. In the summer of 1962, Saskatchewan became the centre of a hard-fought struggle between the provincial government, the North American medical establishment, and the province's physicians, who brought things to a halt with the 1962 Saskatchewan doctors' strike. The doctors complained their best interests were not being met and feared a significant loss of income as well as government interference in medical care decisions even though Douglas had agreed that his government would pay the going rate for service that doctors charged. The medical establishment claimed that Douglas would import foreign doctors to make his plan work and used racist images to try to scare the public.

Douglas is widely known as the father of Medicare, but the Saskatchewan universal program was finally launched by his successor, Woodrow Lloyd, in 1962. Douglas stepped down as premier and as a member of the legislature the previous year, to lead the newly formed federal successor to the CCF, the New Democratic Party of Canada (NDP).

The success of the province's public health care program was not lost on the federal government. Another Saskatchewan politician, newly elected Prime Minister John Diefenbaker, decreed in 1958 that any province seeking to introduce a hospital plan would receive 50 cents on the dollar from the federal government. In 1962, Diefenbaker appointed Justice Emmett Hall—also of Saskatchewan, a noted jurist and Supreme Court Justice—to Chair a Royal Commission on the national health system—the Royal Commission on Health Services. In 1964, Justice Hall recommended a nationwide adoption of Saskatchewan's model of public health insurance. In 1966, the Liberal minority government of Lester B. Pearson created such a program, with the federal government paying 50% of the province's costs. The adoption of public health care across Canada ended up being the work of three men with diverse political ideals – Douglas of the CCF, Diefenbaker of the Progressive Conservatives, and Pearson of the Liberals.

== Federal NDP leader ==
=== Election ===
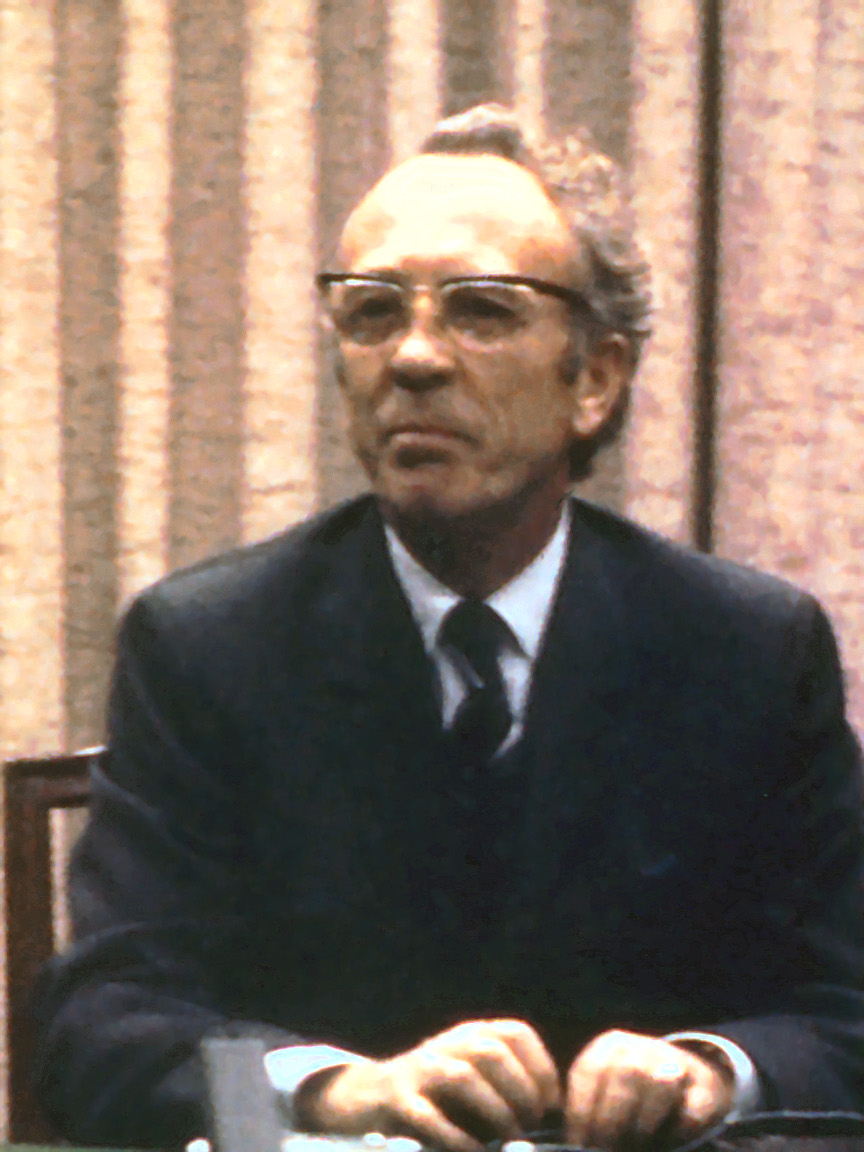
Douglas, c. 1971

The 1958 Canadian general election was a disaster for the CCF; its caucus was reduced to eight, and party leader M. J. Coldwell lost his own seat. The CCF executive knew that their party was dying and needed radical change. The executive persuaded Coldwell to remain as leader, but the party also needed a leader in the House of Commons to replace him, because he obviously was no longer a Member of Parliament. The CCF parliamentary caucus chose Hazen Argue as its new leader in the House. During the lead-up to the 1960 CCF convention, Argue was pressing Coldwell to step down; this leadership challenge jeopardized plans for an orderly transition to the new party that was being planned by the CCF and the Canadian Labour Congress. CCF national president David Lewis – who succeeded Coldwell as president in 1958, when the national chairman and national president positions were merged – and the rest of the new party's organizers opposed Argue's manoeuvres and wanted Douglas to be the new party's first leader. To prevent their plans from being derailed, Lewis unsuccessfully attempted to persuade Argue not to force a vote at the convention on the question of the party's leadership, and there was a split between the parliamentary caucus and the party executive on the convention floor. Coldwell stepped down as leader, and Argue replaced him, becoming the party's final national leader.

As far back as 1941, Coldwell wanted Douglas to succeed him in leading the National CCF (at that time, it was obvious that Coldwell would be assuming the national leadership in the near future). When the time came for the "New Party" to form, in 1961, Coldwell pressured Douglas to run for the leadership. Coldwell did not trust Argue, and many in the CCF leadership thought that he was already having secret meetings with the Liberals with a view to a party merger. Also, Coldwell and Douglas thought Lewis would not be a viable alternative to Argue because Lewis was not likely to defeat Argue; this was partly due to Lewis' lack of a parliamentary seat but also, and likely more importantly, because his role as party disciplinarian over the years had made him many enemies, enough to potentially prevent him from winning the leadership. Douglas, after much consultation with Coldwell, Lewis, and his caucus, decided in June 1961 to reluctantly contest the leadership of the New Party. He handily defeated Argue on 3 August 1961 at the first NDP leadership convention in Ottawa, and became the new party's first leader. Six months later, Argue crossed the floor and became a Liberal.

=== House of Commons, Act II ===
Douglas resigned from provincial politics and sought election to the House of Commons in the riding of Regina City in 1962, but was defeated by Ken More. He was later elected in a by-election in the riding of Burnaby—Coquitlam, British Columbia.

Re-elected as MP for that riding in the 1963 and 1965 elections, Douglas lost the redistricted seat of Burnaby—Seymour in the 1968 federal election. He won a seat again in a 1969 by-election in the riding of Nanaimo—Cowichan—The Islands, following the death of Colin Cameron in 1968, and represented it until his retirement from electoral politics in 1979.

While the NDP did better in elections than its CCF predecessor, the party did not experience the breakthrough it had hoped for. Despite this, Douglas was greatly respected by party members and Canadians at large as the party wielded considerable influence during Lester Pearson's minority governments in the mid-1960s.

=== Views on homosexuality ===
During the 1968 Federal Election, Douglas described homosexuality as a treatable illness by saying it was "a mental illness... [and] a psychiatric condition", as the American Psychiatric Association. Rather than treating it as a criminal offence with imprisonment, Douglas believed it could be treated by psychiatrists and social workers. This view of homosexuality was mainstream at the time. Nevertheless, Douglas would vote in favour of Bill C-150 in 1969, which decriminalized homosexuality.

=== The War Measures Act, 1970 ===
The October Crisis put Douglas and David Lewis—now a Member of Parliament—on the "hotseat", with Lewis being the only NDP MP with any roots in Quebec. He and Lewis were opposed to 16 October implementation of the War Measures Act. The act, enacted previously only for wartime purposes, imposed extreme limitations on civil liberties, and gave the police and military vastly expanded powers for arresting and detaining suspects, usually with little to no evidence required. Although it was only meant to be used in Quebec, since it was federal legislation, it was in force throughout Canada. Some police services, from outside of Quebec, took advantage of it for their own purposes, which mostly had nothing even remotely related to the Quebec situation, as Lewis and Douglas suspected. During a second vote on 19 October, sixteen of the twenty members of the NDP parliamentary caucus voted against the implementation of the War Measures Act in the House of Commons and four voted with the Liberal government.

They took much grief for being the only parliamentarians to vote against it, dropping to an approval rating of seven per cent in public opinion polls. Lewis, speaking for the party at a press scrum that day: "The information we do have, showed a situation of criminal acts and criminal conspiracy in Quebec. But, there is no information that there was unintended, or apprehended, or planned insurrection, which alone, would justify invoking the War Measures Act." Douglas voiced similar criticism: "The government, I submit, is using a sledgehammer to crack a peanut."

About five years later, some of the MPs who voted to implement it regretted doing so, and belatedly honoured Douglas and Lewis for their stand against it. Progressive Conservative leader Robert Stanfield went so far as to say "Quite frankly, I've admired Tommy Douglas and David Lewis, and those fellows in the NDP for having the courage to vote against that, although they took a lot of abuse at the time ... I don't brood about it. I'm not proud of it."

== Late career and retirement ==
Douglas resigned as NDP leader in 1971 but retained his seat in the House of Commons. Around the same time as the leadership convention held to replace him, he asked the party not to buy him an elaborate parting gift. Instead, he and his friend and political mentor M. J. Coldwell were honoured by the party with the creation of the Douglas–Coldwell Foundation in 1971. He served as the NDP's energy critic under the new leader, David Lewis. He was re-elected in the riding of Nanaimo–Cowichan–The Islands in the 1972 and 1974 elections. He retired from politics in 1979 and served on the board of directors of Husky Oil, an Alberta oil and gas exploration company that had holdings in Saskatchewan.

In June 1984, Douglas was injured when he was struck by a bus, but he quickly recovered and on his 80th birthday he claimed to The Globe and Mail that he usually walked up to five miles a day. By this point in his life his memory was beginning to slow down and he stopped accepting speaking engagements but remained active in the Douglas–Coldwell Foundation. Later that year, on 30 November, he became a member of the Queen's Privy Council for Canada.

Douglas died of cancer at the age of 81 on 24 February 1986, in Ottawa and was buried at Beechwood Cemetery.

== Legacy and commemorations ==
Douglas has been commemorated in monuments, public buildings, educational institutions, national honours, and cultural works across Canada, reflecting his enduring association with universal health care and social democratic reform.

=== Places and the built environment ===
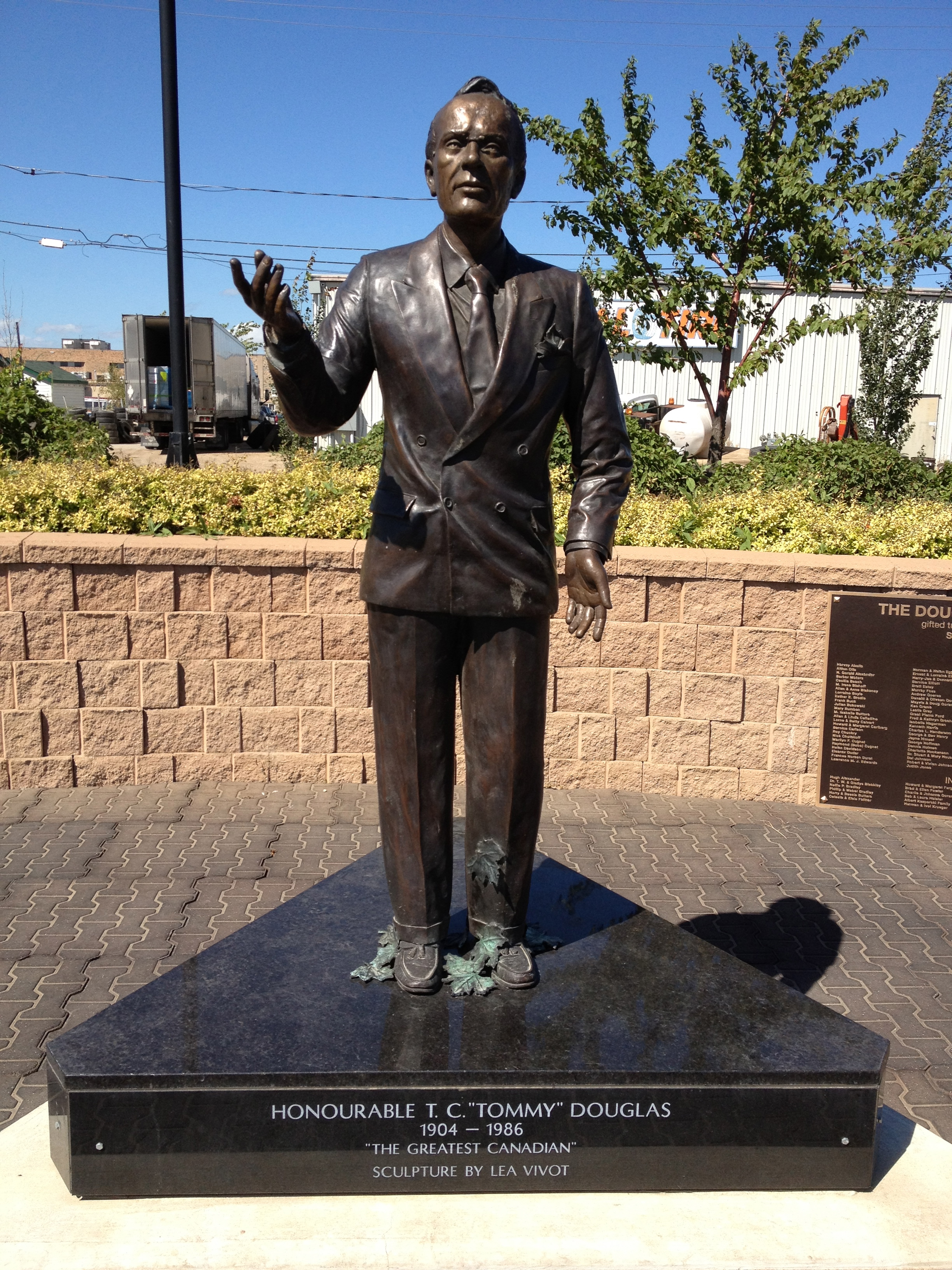
The Greatest Canadian, a statue depicting Douglas created by Lea Vivot and installed along the riverfront boardwalk in Weyburn, Saskatchewan

Several public sites and monuments across Canada bear his name or commemorate his contributions.

- The T. C. Douglas Building in Regina, Saskatchewan, completed in 1978 and situated within the Wascana Centre, was named after him. It houses provincial government offices as well as the MacKenzie Art Gallery.
- Douglas Provincial Park, located near Lake Diefenbaker and the Qu'Appelle River Dam in Saskatchewan, was designated in his honour.
- A statue titled The Greatest Canadian, created by sculptor Lea Vivot, was installed along the riverfront boardwalk in Weyburn, Saskatchewan, in September 2010 and unveiled by his grandson, actor Kiefer Sutherland.
- In March 2019, the Government of Canada commemorated Douglas as a person of national historic significance, and a plaque honouring him as the Father of Medicare was unveiled in Regina.

=== Educational institutions ===
A number of academic institutions and educational facilities have been named in recognition of his public service.

- Brandon University created a students' union building in honour of Douglas and his old friend, Stanley Knowles.
- Tommy Douglas Collegiate in Saskatoon opened in August 2007 and bears his name.
- A branch of the Burnaby Public Library in Burnaby, British Columbia, opened on 17 November 2009 and is named after Douglas.
- Tommy Douglas Secondary School in Vaughan, Ontario, opened in February 2015 and was dedicated in his honour by the York Region District School Board.
- Campus Co-operative Residences in Toronto named one of its houses, T. C. Douglas House (146 Howland Avenue), in his honour.

=== National symbolic honours ===
Douglas received several major honours during his lifetime, and his legacy continued to be formally recognized after his death.

- On 22 June 1981, he was appointed to the Order of Canada as a Companion for his service as a political leader and innovator in public policy.
- In 1985, he was appointed to the Saskatchewan Order of Merit.
- In 2004, Douglas was selected as The Greatest Canadian in a nationwide viewer poll conducted by the Canadian Broadcasting Corporation.
- On 29 June 2012, Canada Post issued a commemorative postage stamp honouring Douglas, marking the 50th anniversary of Saskatchewan's Medical Care Insurance Act.

=== International commemoration ===
Douglas's influence has also been recognized beyond Canada.

- In 2014, the former National Labor College in Silver Spring, Maryland, was renamed the Tommy Douglas Center following its purchase by the Amalgamated Transit Union.

=== Artistic depictions ===
Douglas has been portrayed and referenced in documentary and dramatic works reflecting his place in Canadian political history.

- In 1986, the National Film Board of Canada released the documentary Tommy Douglas: Keeper of the Flame, which received the Gemini Award for Best Writing in a Documentary Program or Series.
- Douglas was portrayed by Eric Peterson in the CBC Television mini-series Trudeau and Trudeau II: Maverick in the Making.
- The biographical mini-series Prairie Giant: The Tommy Douglas Story aired on CBC on 12 and 13 March 2006, with Douglas portrayed by Michael Therriault. The production was criticized as historically inaccurate, particularly in its portrayal of former Saskatchewan premier James Garfield Gardiner. CBC subsequently consulted a third-party historian and withdrew the film from future broadcasts and home distribution. The film was later broadcast in Asia on the Hallmark Channel on 11 and 12 June 2007.
- Douglas was mentioned in the 2007 documentary film Sicko, directed by Michael Moore, which compared the health care systems of the United States and Canada.

== Fables ==
"The Cream Separator" is a fable, written by Douglas, which aims to explain the inherent injustices of the capitalist system as it relates to the agricultural sector by making the analogy that the upper class gets the cream, the middle class gets the whole milk, and the farmers and industrial workers get a watery substance that barely resembles milk.

He was also known for his retelling of the fable of "Mouseland", which likens the majority of voters to mice, and how they either elect black or white cats as their politicians, but never their own mice: meaning that workers and their general interests were not being served by electing wealthy politicians from the Liberal or Conservative parties (black and white cats), and that only a party from their class (mice), originally the CCF, later the NDP, could serve their interests (mice). Years later, his grandson, television actor Kiefer Sutherland, provided the introduction to a Mouseland animated video that used a Douglas Mouseland speech as its narration.

== Electoral history ==
Electoral history of Tommy Douglas – Provincial and federal general elections
Year	Type	Party	Votes			Seats		Position
Year	Type	Party	Total	%	±%	Total	±	Position
1944	Provincial	Co-operative; Commonwealth	211,364	53.1%	+34.4%	47 / 52	+37	Majority government
1948	Provincial	Co-operative; Commonwealth	236,900	47.6%	−5.5%	31 / 52	−16	Majority government
1952	Provincial	Co-operative; Commonwealth	291,705	54.1%	+6.5%	42 / 53	+11	Majority government
1956	Provincial	Co-operative; Commonwealth	249,634	45.3%	−8.8%	36 / 53	−6	Majority government
1960	Provincial	Co-operative; Commonwealth	276,846	40.8%	−4.5%	37 / 54	+1	Majority government
1962	Federal	New Democratic	1,044,754	13.57%	N/A	19 / 265	N/A	Fourth party
1963	Federal	New Democratic	1,044,701	13.22%	−0.35%	17 / 265	−2	Fourth party
1965	Federal	New Democratic	1,381,658	17.91%	+4.69%	21 / 265	+4	Third party
1968	Federal	New Democratic	1,378,263	16.96%	−0.95%	22 / 264	+1	Third party

Electoral history of Tommy Douglas – Provincial and federal constituency elections
Year	Type	Riding	Party	Votes for Douglas				Result	Swing
Year	Type	Riding	Party	Total	%	P.	±%	Result	Swing
1934	Provincial general	Weyburn	Farmer–Labour	1,343	25.84%	3rd	N/A	Lost	Gain
1935	Federal general	Weyburn	Co-operative; Commonwealth	7,280	45.00%	1st	N/A	Elected	Gain
1940	Federal general	Weyburn	Co-operative; Commonwealth	8,509	52.10%	1st	+7.10%	Elected	Hold
1944	Provincial general	Weyburn	Co-operative; Commonwealth	5,605	61.63%	1st	N/A	Elected	Gain
1948	Provincial general	Weyburn	Co-operative; Commonwealth	6,273	56.31%	1st	−5.32%	Elected	Hold
1952	Provincial general	Weyburn	Co-operative; Commonwealth	6,020	59.86%	1st	+3.55%	Elected	Hold
1956	Provincial general	Weyburn	Co-operative; Commonwealth	4,930	48.17%	1st	−11.69%	Elected	Hold
1960	Provincial general	Weyburn	Co-operative; Commonwealth	5,054	48.43%	1st	+0.26%	Elected	Hold
1962	Federal general	Regina City	New Democratic	12,736	28.94%	2nd	N/A	Lost	Hold
1962	Federal by-election	Burnaby—Coquitlam	New Democratic	16,313	50.43%	1st	N/A	Elected	Hold
1963	Federal general	Burnaby—Coquitlam	New Democratic	19,067	46.37%	1st	−4.06%	Elected	Hold
1965	Federal general	Burnaby—Coquitlam	New Democratic	22,553	52.92%	1st	+6.55%	Elected	Hold
1968	Federal general	Burnaby—Seymour	New Democratic	17,753	44.89%	2nd	N/A	Lost	Gain
1969	Federal by-election	Nanaimo—Cowichan —The Islands	New Democratic	19,730	57.03%	1st	N/A	Elected	Hold
1972	Federal general	Nanaimo—Cowichan —The Islands	New Democratic	25,483	56.93%	1st	−0.10%	Elected	Hold

== Honorary degrees ==
Douglas received honorary degrees from several universities, including

- University of Saskatchewan in Saskatoon, Saskatchewan (LLD) in 1962
- McMaster University in Hamilton, Ontario (LLD) in May 1969
- Queen's University in Kingston, Ontario (LLD) on 27 May 1972
- University of Regina in Regina, Saskatchewan in 1978
- Carleton University in Ottawa, Ontario (LLD) in 1980
- University of Toronto in Toronto, Ontario (LLD) in June 1980
- University of British Columbia in Vancouver, British Columbia, (LLD) 27 May 1981
- Trent University in Peterborough, Ontario (LLD) in 1983

== Archives ==
There are Tommy Douglas fonds at Library and Archives Canada and the Provincial Archives of Saskatchewan.
