= Mount Logan (Quebec) =

Mountain in Quebec, Canada

- Mont Logan
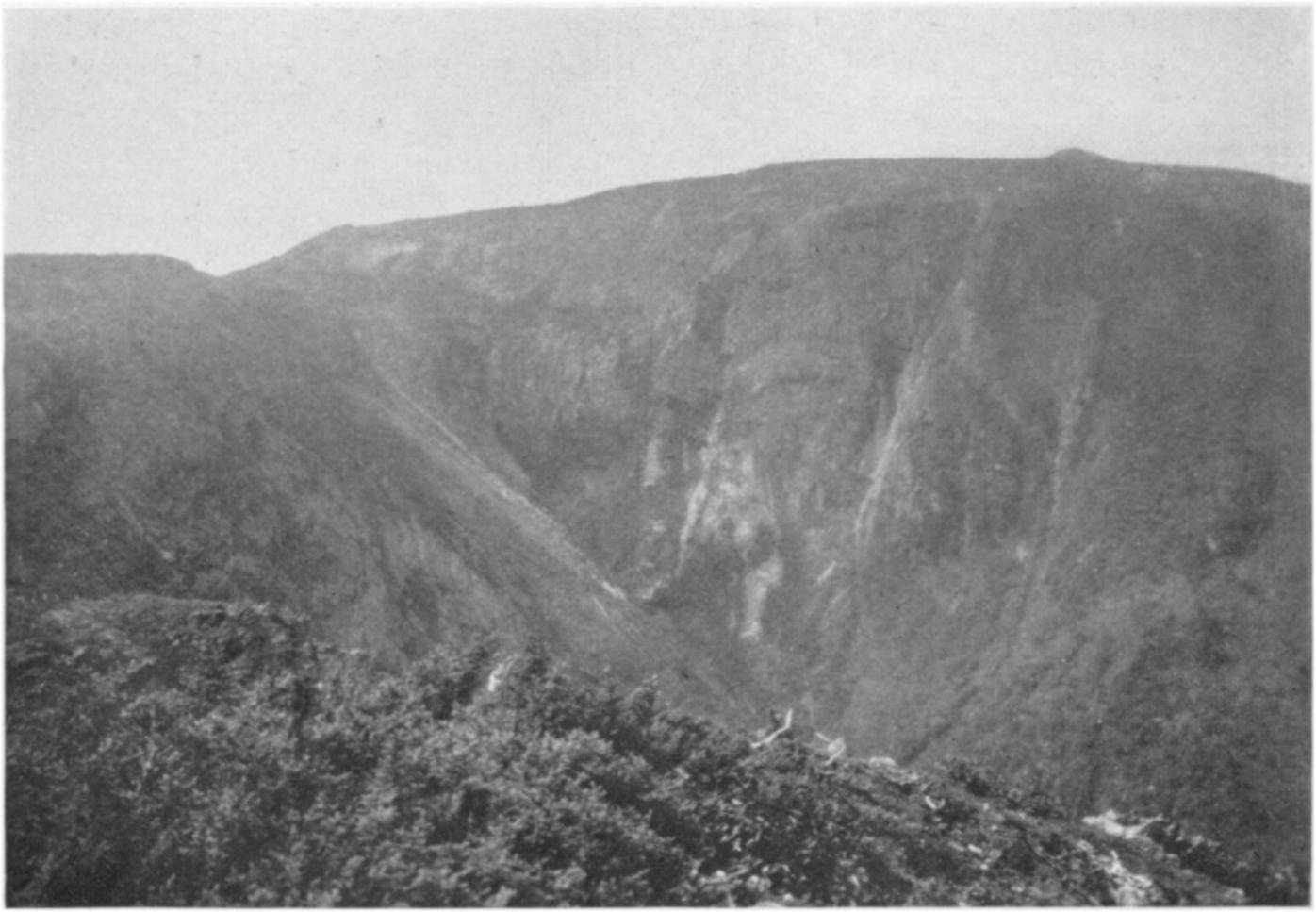
- The eastern slope of Mount Logan in 1923.

Highest point
- Elevation: 1,150 m (3,770 ft)
- Coordinates: 48°53′26″N 66°38′20″W

Geography
- Location within Quebec
- Interactive map of Mount Logan
- Country: Canada
- Province: Quebec
- Region: Bas-Saint-Laurent
- Parent range: Chic-Choc Mountains (Notre Dame Mountains, Appalachian Mountains)
- Topo map: NTS 22B15 Mont Logan

Geology
- Rock age: 450 million years
- Rock type(s): metabasalt and metasedimentary rock

Climbing
- First ascent: 1844 by Alexander Murray and William Edmond Logan
- Easiest route: Eastern slope

Mount Logan is a mountain on the Gaspé Peninsula, in Quebec, Canada. Part of the Chic-Choc Mountains, Mount Logan rises 1,150 metres (3,773 ft) above sea level, making it the highest point in the Bas-Saint-Laurent region and one of the few Quebec peaks over 1,100 metres (3,609 ft).

The mountain's unusually steep northern flank is visible from Cap-Chat, on the Saint Lawrence River. The altitude and the summit's exposure to winds from the Gulf of St. Lawrence make it one of Quebec's most precipitated summits. The combination of the mountain's physiography and unusual climate make it the habitat of several rare animal and plant species, such as caribou and griscom arnica.

Mount Logan's topography, ancient geological composition, and remarkable flora and fauna aroused the scientific community's interest in the mid-19th century.

Despite conditions favorable for skiing, Mount Logan's remoteness has worked against efforts to develop recreational and tourist enterprises. Straddling the boundaries of Gaspésie National Park, the Réserve faunique de Matane (Matane Animal Reserve), and the Fernald Ecological Reserve, its protected status works to the advantage of conservation by severely limiting industrial activities such as forestry or broadcasting.

== Toponymy ==
Mount Logan is named after William Edmond Logan. Although already in use for some time, the name was formalized in 1898 by the Geological Survey of Canada. The highest point in Canada, Mount Logan in Yukon, is also named in his honor.

== Geography ==
=== Location ===
External image
- Employé de la Réserve faunique de Matane. "Mount Logan". Le monde en images.

Mount Logan is in the unorganized area of Rivière-Bonjour, on the Gaspé Peninsula's northern flank in the province of Quebec in eastern Canada. It is 65 kilometres (40 mi) east of Matane, the capital of the La Matanie Regional County Municipality, and 410 kilometres (250 mi) northeast of Quebec City, the provincial capital. The summit rises to about 1,150 metres (3,770 ft) in the Chic-Choc Mountains of the chain of the Notre Dame Mountains.

=== Topography ===
Topographic map of the mountain and surrounding area.

The Mount Logan massif contains three physiographic divisions. The north features highlands, the center is a mountain ridge of the Chic-Chocs and the south is a plain.

The piedmont highlands are made up of wooded valleys with an average altitude of 550 metres (1,800 ft). Streams and rivers flow through ravines up to 400 metres (1,300 ft).

Mount Logan's terrain is variegated, with gentle rounded and grassy slopes alongside steep cliffs. To the north, a steep escarpment makes it one of eastern Canada's highest peaks, with a height at the peak of 620 metres (2,030 ft). This wall, whose height varies between 450 and 600 meters (1,480 and 1,970 ft), has a slope generally between 20 and 40 degrees and is even vertical in certain places. The wall is visible from several places along the coast of the Saint Lawrence, in particular Cap-Chat and Sainte-Anne-des-Monts. The wall's western portion, although not as steep, is nonetheless as impassable. The slopes of the southern flank of the massif are gentle; its elevation varies from 180 to 300 metres (590 to 980 ft), with a sloping distance of about one kilometer.

The summit itself is a picturesque dome with an elevation of up to 1,150 metres (3,770 ft), set on a ridge of similarly elevated peaks (Mattawees, Fortin, Pembroke) interspersed with deep valleys.

=== Geology ===
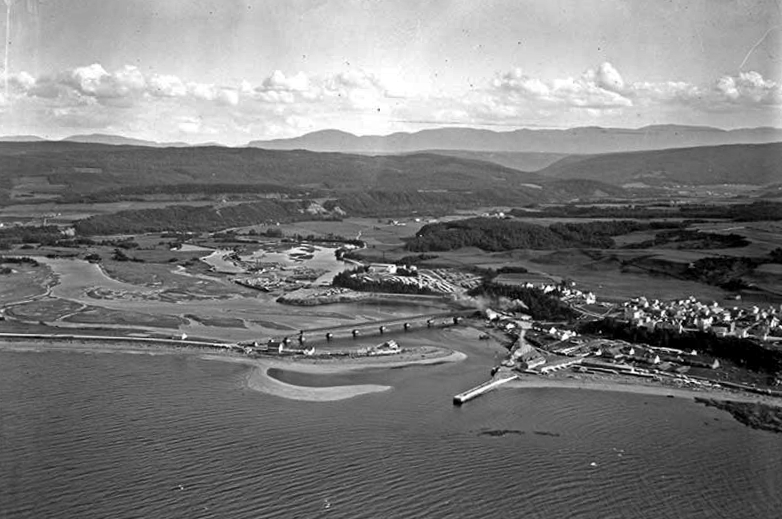
The north flank of the Chic-Chocs and its characteristic fault plane seen from the harbor of Cap-Chat.

Mount Logan was formed about 450 million years ago, during the Lower Ordovician, Paleozoic era During the Taconic orogeny, a mountain-building period that affected most of modern-day New England, the lateral pressure exerted by other formations in the bedrock created folds and a bed load a few hundred meters thick. The north overlap fault of Lake Cascapedia marks the front of one of these folds. The southern edge is made up of a strike-slip fault zone known as the "South Schikshock" or the "Brompton – Baie-Verte line". This line separates the Taconian belt from the Acadian belt. The Logan nappe consists of metabasalt and metasedimentary rocks., which are harder than the rocks of the surrounding formations, which in turn erode faster, revealing the unusual relief of the Chic-Choc mountains, and more specifically of Mont Logan.

Soundings revealed intrusions of the Devonian in the form of sill and dyke. This research also revealed a substantial presence of copper, talc and marl on the mountain.

=== Climate ===
There is no station providing continuous climate data at the top of Mount Logan; a climate model is used to estimate temperatures and precipitation from data from surrounding stations.

The climate of the mountain is influenced by its altitude and its proximity to the Gulf of St. Lawrence, whose currents carry cold waters from the Arctic. The average temperature at the top of the mountain is around −3 °C (27 °F). Moisture condenses there more easily due to the lower pressure and temperatures at the summit. Thus, on an annual basis, the mountains receive some of the greatest amounts of precipitation in Quebec. Episodes of rain, melting conditions, the formation of ice shells and numerous snowstorms during the winter combine to cause conditions conducive to avalanches, common on the cliffs of the mountain.

The prevailing winds are from the west. At 31.9 kilometres (19.8 mi) east of Logan, on Mount Albert., (Note: Similar in elevation and latitude to Mount Logan.) winds average 24 kilometres per hour (15 mph), and gusts of 250 kilometres per hour (160 mph) have been recorded.

=== Fauna and flora ===
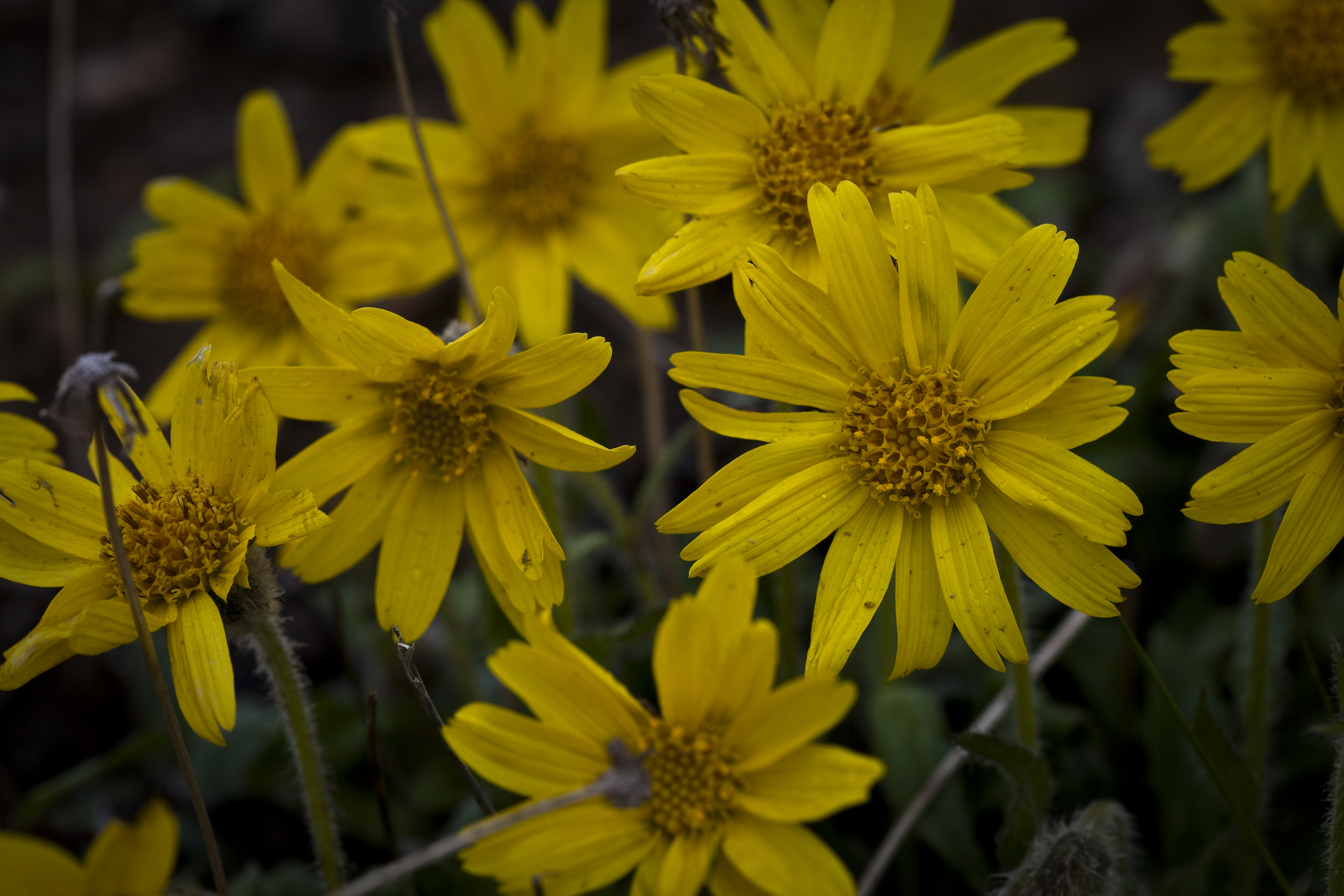
Griscom's Arnica is endemic to the Gulf of St. Lawrence.

Mount Logan is primarily covered in fir forest with white birch. The preindustrial forest was dominated by mature conifers, but logging has changed that. In particular, the Hammermill Paper Company held cutting rights for an annual volume of 72,000 cubic metres (2,500,000 cu ft) of wood on the mountain, which has since transformed the forest into mostly young coniferous shoots and hardwoods. The regeneration cycle is slow: 30 to 60 years (950 to 1,890 Ms) are required for a grove dominated by balsam fir to mature, nearly twice as long as other conifers.

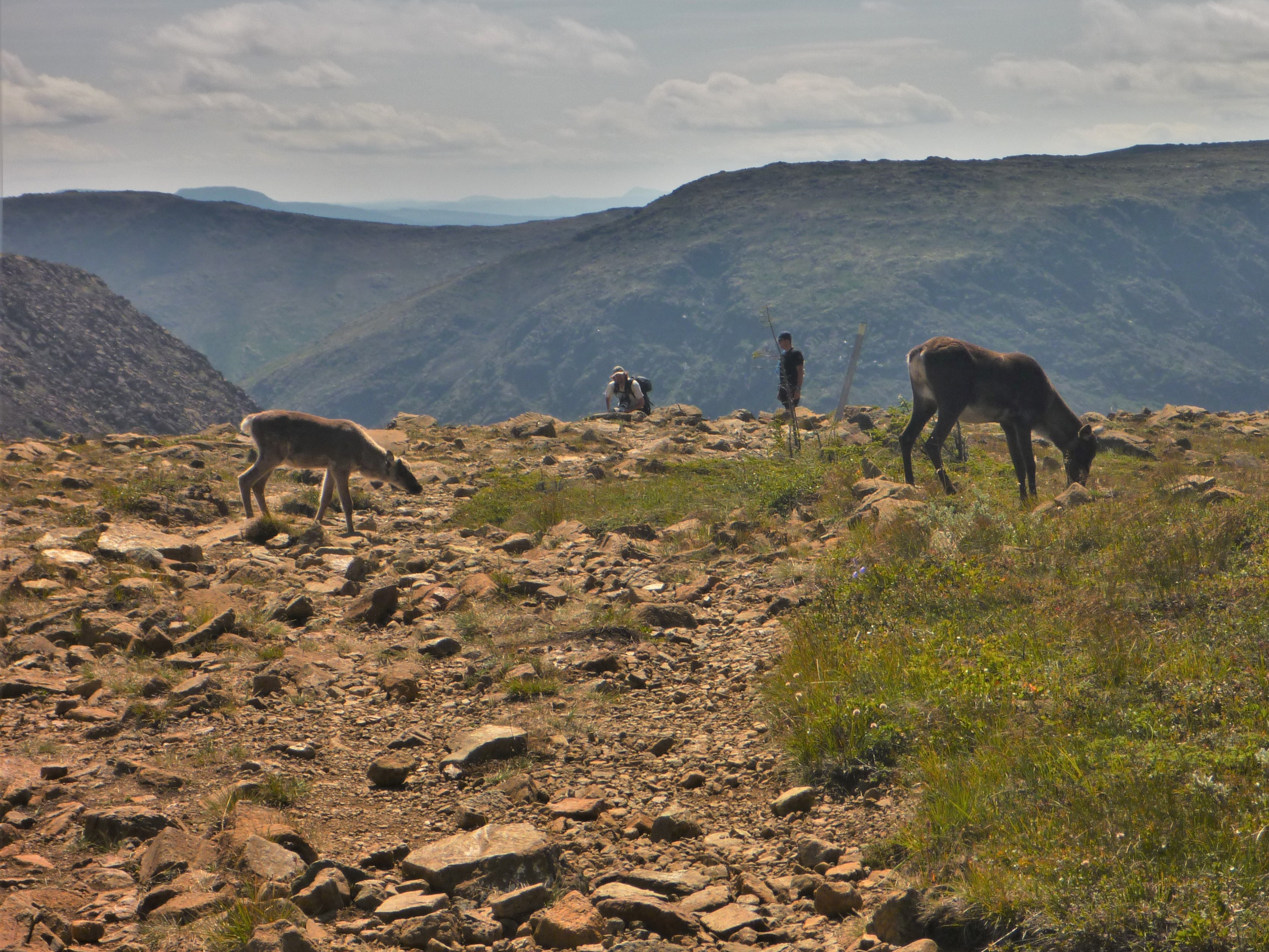
Gaspé caribou frequent Mount Logan.

The altitude of the mountain and its exposure to the winds make it an excellent site for the vegetation of subalpine meadows. The western slope of the mountain and its summit are home to a large number of rare, threatened or vulnerable plant species, some of which are endemic to the Chic-Choc massif. The Ministry of the Environment and Fight Against Climate Change protect threatened or vulnerable species on the mountain such as Arnica griscomii, Arnica lanceolata, the Athyrium distentifolium, Packera, Cirsium montanum, Dryopteris filix-mas, Festuca altaica, Norwegian gnaphale and Gaspé saxifrage.

In its land use plan, La Matanie Regional County Municipality identifies the mountain as the habitat of many plants likely to be vulnerable, such as Rosy Cat's Foot, Allen's Buttercup, sagina, snow saxifrage, and Cerastium cerastoides.

Mount Logan is home to two vulnerable animal species. The eastern slope is a habitat for Bicknell's thrush. Gaspésie-Atlantique caribou, having deserted it in the 1970s, now frequent the mountain again.

== History ==
=== Logan's Expedition ===
In search of coal, William Edmond Logan explored Gaspé for the first time in 1843, and returned there in 1844. On a boat taking him to Gaspé, chemist Édouard Sylvestre de Rottermund, joking with Captain Walter Douglas, proposed to name the highest mountain they could see off Cap-Chat, as "Logan", which they intended to explore. Logan disapproved of this.

Along with the Earl of Rottermund, the geologist Alexander Murray, two assistants, and four Mi'gmaq guides, the party left Cap-Chat on 5 July 1844, with the intention of reaching Mont Saint-Joseph and Chaleur Bay. The explorers proceeded to the peaks visible from the coast in the north of the peninsula, then canoed up the Cap-Chat River. They reached the base of the mountain on July 14. Four days later, they become the first Europeans to reach the summit of Mount Logan, planting the Union Jack there. Logan described the view:

From the highest peak we visited, the panorama was most magnificent. On the northern half of the circle, the waters of the St. Lawrence, dotted with ships and fishing boats, stretched left and right for as far as the eye could see [...].

Towards the east, a confusion of mountains and ravines belonging to the Monts Notre-Dame filled the horizon, and we assumed that a summit, which showed a patch of snow, might have been higher than the point at which we were standing. found. Several of the peaks that we could see were bare rock [...].

Towards the south, an undulating sea of parallel ridges occupied the picture [...].

On lower elevations, spruce trees mingled with birch trees, and tree sizes increased as elevation decreased. After confinement in the forest below, the high altitude vegetation hit us hard and satisfied us greatly. Large expanses of open meadow appeared to us on all sides except the north. Wide slopes to the east, south and west were carpeted with the most lush shoots and a diversity of ferns, from which the hills sometimes looked like park landscapes or works of art as if the distribution was arranged for an ornamental purpose and often producing, with peaks, ravines and a distant horizon, landscapes of the most grandiose.

The expedition explored the surroundings, then crossed a pass to finally reach the Cascapedia River, which they surveyed in detail. They reached Chaleur Bay on 6 September 1844.

=== Fernald's Expeditions ===
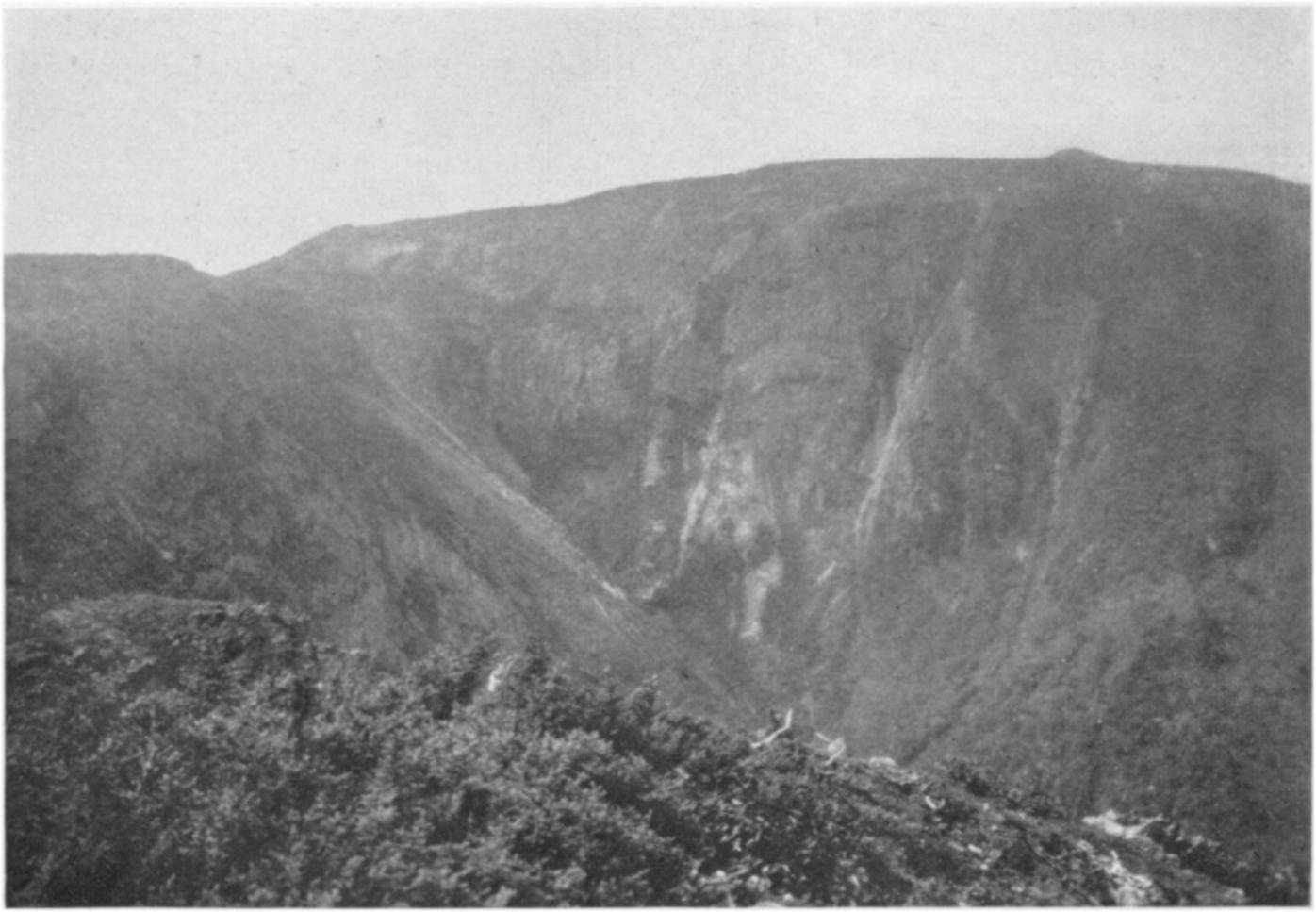
Fernald reaches the summit of Mount Logan following Logan's directions.

Academic publications became interested in the Chic-Chocs massif during the 1920s. Noting the paucity of knowledge of the mountain, the botanist Merritt Lyndon Fernald tried to reach the summit of Mount Logan with the intention to survey the flora. His work was inspired by the Laurentian herbarium of the botanist John Macoun, as well as physiographic studies by geologists William Edmond Logan, Arthur Coleman and Frederick J. Alcock.

In 1922, accompanied by botanist Arthur Stanley Pease and guide Joseph Fortin, Fernald tried to find the trail that Logan had taken to the summit. With little information the researchers attempted several routes to reach the top, but a series of thunderstorms put an end to their expedition. The following year, Fernald formed a team of seven botanists, including Pease, James Franklin Collins, Carroll William Dodge, Ludlow Griscom, Kenneth Kent Mackenzie and Lyman Bradford Smith. They found plants on the mountain characteristic of the Canadian Arctic and Western Cordillera, which had never before seen so far south and east. The expedition identified about 3,000 different plants: arctic, alpine and endemic. Fernald hypothesized that Mount Logan and the surrounding peaks were nunataqs during the last ice age.

Several neighboring mountains and a sunflower were named in honor of Fernald's acolytes: Mont Collins and Mont Dodge, and arnica de Griscom. Fernald's work in Gaspésie inspired botanist Brother Marie-Victorin to form his Laurentian Flore, a botanical record of species indigenous to Southern Quebec.

=== Focal point for television broadcasting in Eastern Canada ===
External image
- Employee of the Matane wildlife reserve (1980). "Mont Logan". Le monde en images.

As television spread across Quebec in the 1960s, a race to claim the Chic-Chocs emerged between different broadcasting groups. At the beginning of 1961, Télévision Transgaspésienne (TVTG, affiliated with Télé-Métropole) and the Compagnie de broadcasting de Matane (CKBL) both demanded from the Board of Broadcast Governors a broadcasting license on the highest summits of Gaspé. TVTG had obtained from the Quebec State an emphyteutic lease for the installation of an antenna at the top of Mount Jacques-Cartier; CKBL, which was ultimately licensed, instead obtained permission from the government to occupy the Logan summit.

Yvan Fortier, the technical director of the station, led the project. Construction took place from June to October 1961. The work was extensive: a 6 miles (10 km) road connecting Saint-Octave-de-l'Avenir to the 260 feet (79 m) transmitter was built, as well as buildings and a generator. But the equipment installed was rudimentary. To ensure uninterrupted television signal in Gaspésie, on the North-Shore and Labrador, three technicians and their families were assigned in rotation to reside at the transmitter's base, supplied with food and oil by helicopter, then by snowmobile.

Although powerful, the signal was ill-suited to the rugged Gaspé topography and as a result it was difficult to turn a profit. Contemporaneously, at the foot of the mountain, the village of Saint-Octave-de-l'Avenir was abandoned, forcing supplies to be obtained from Cap-Chat. When the Société Radio-Canada (SRC) acquired CKBL in 1972, plans to put the transmitter off-wave were made. In 1977 by the engineers of the SRC announced operation "Descent of Mount Logan", and part of the installations were dismantled the next year. The remaining buildings and the main pylon were demolished in 2011.

In 2007, SRC, still owner of the summit, tried to divest itself of its land. The Ministry of Environment blocked the sale. Studies revealed soil contamination from the diesel that once powered the generators. A decontamination project began in 2014. The process was mandated to be spread over a period of at least six years due to the harshness of the climate, the isolation of the site, and ecological sensitivity.

Since 2019, the summit serves as a radio transmission site for the operations of the Society for the Protection of Forests Against Fire (SOPFEU), the National Integrated Radiocommunication Network (RENIR) of the Ministry of Government Services, and de Télécommunications de l'Est. Radio-Canada remains the owner of block B of the Faribault township.

=== Ski resort proposals ===
In order to make their Mont Logan transmitter profitable, the owners of CKBL planned to develop the ski potential of the mountain as soon as it was put into service. They called on Ernie McCullogh, a ski trainer, to organize an exploration expedition with industrialists from Matane, followed by a cinematographic expedition to demonstrate its potential in the spring of 1964. The mountain was praised for its abundant and persistent snow, in addition to its multiple slopes. McCullogh planned to make Mount Logan the training site for the Canadian alpine ski team, comparing it to Val-d'Isère, a ski resort in the French Alps.

The expeditions attracted the attention of politicians and Toronto financiers. Details included a ski resort accommodating up to 5,000 skiers, five chairlifts, and lodging in nearby towns and hotels. Initial estimated costs were US$1,500,000, then US$3,000,000, and eventually between US$7,000,000 and US$10,000,000. The Ministry of Lands and Forests entrusted Claude Robillard with the task of studying the plausibility of the project. Plans eventually became more elaborate with the inclusion of a network of access roads and an airport large enough to accommodate airliners, which would have cost 40000000. Ultimately, no public investment was made. Mont Sainte-Anne, closer to Quebec and Montreal, was preferred for establishing an international ski resort.

The project was discussed again in the mid-1970s, this time with using helicopter for ski transport. The Quebec government decided not to invest. Nevertheless, a heli-ski resort was privately operated between 1985 and 1990. The effort was short-lived due to competition from Massif de Charlevoix.

In 2002, the Société des establishments de plein air du Québec picked Mont Jean-Yves-Bérubé over Mount Logan for the construction of a luxury resort.

== Activities ==
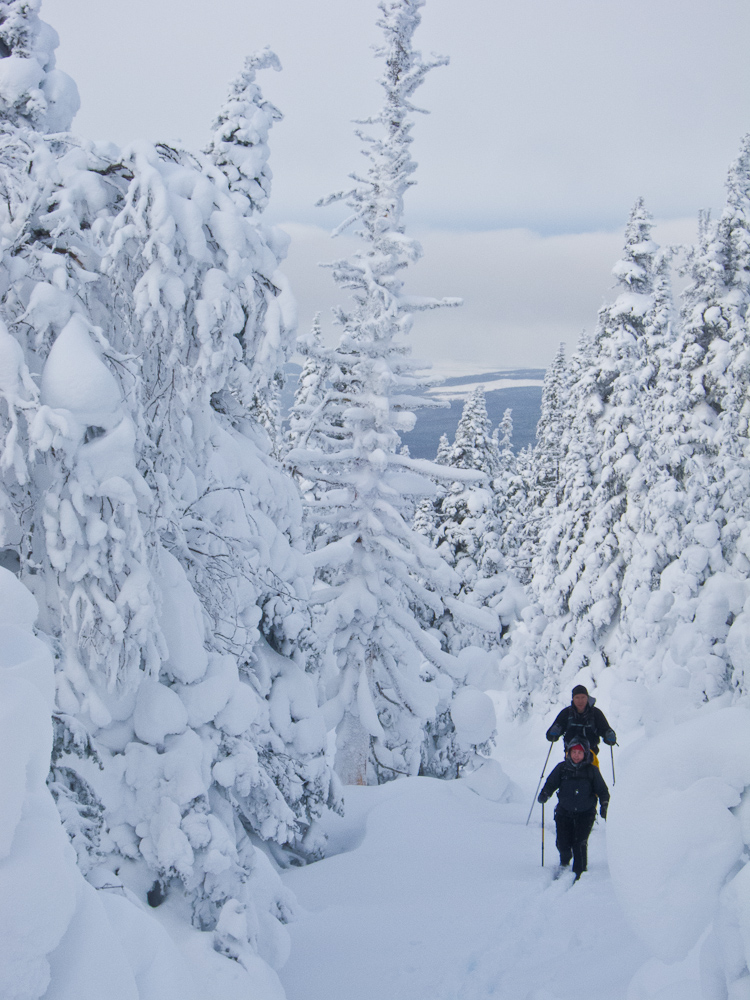
Mountain skiing on Mont Logan.

=== Mountain skiing ===
While attempts to establish the infrastructure necessary for a ski resort have failed, mountain skiing is still practiced on Mount Logan. Parc national de la Gaspésie and the Société des establishments de plein air du Québec provide rudimentary infrastructure on Mount Logan and surrounding peaks in the form of beacons, shelters, refuges and emergency equipment.

Although the slopes of the southern slope are of intermediate class, they are nevertheless a challenge even for advanced skiers. Journeying to the summit from Saint-Octave-de-l'Avenir is via a long trail of 35 kilometres (22 mi) whose positive elevation is close to 800 meters (2,600 ft) and requires two to three days of hiking.

Snowmobile transport is offered from Mont Jean-Yves Bérubé at Mount Logan at Chic-Chocs mountain inn in Cap-Chat.

=== Hiking ===
Ascent of Mount Logan is possible when the ground is clear of snow, from late June to late September. The trails are isolated and rarely frequented. The hike generally requires overnight camping. Climbing the mountain is also possible from the west, via the international Appalachian trail from the Cap-Chat River valley. The round trip requires two to three days of hiking. From the east, it is possible to take a forest path or a steep path. In order to shorten the route, one can take a shuttle from Cap-Chat. or the Mont Albert.

=== Environmental protection ===
As part of the Gaspé National Park, most of the mountain has been protected since 1937. In order to ensure increased protection of the flora and fauna particular to the Chic-Chocs massif, industrial forestry and mining have been prohibited in the park since 1977. The summit of the mountain is not part of the Parc de la Gaspésie, as Société Radio-Canada is still decontaminating diesel in the soil.

The eastern slope benefits from additional protection to ensure the survival of rare and threatened plant specimens found there. Part of the western slope, while excluded from the protections of Parc de la Gaspésie, is protected by the Réserve faunique de Matane. In the northwest, the Fernald ecological reserve provides full protection of the escarpment north of the Collins, Mattawees and Fortin summits.

The entire mountain is included in the legal habitat of the Gaspé caribou.

== See also ==
- Chic-Choc Mountains
- Geography of Quebec
- La Matanie Regional County Municipality
- Gaspésie National Park
- Matane Wildlife Reserve
