= Thomas-Sterry-Hunt International Ecological Reserve =

Nature reserve in Quebec, Canada

Coordinates: 46.5222°N 70.0389°W

- IUCN category Ia (strict nature reserve)
- Interactive map of Thomas-Sterry-Hunt International Ecological Reserve
- Location: Saint-Just-de-Bretenières, Montmagny Regional County Municipality, Québec, Canada
- Established: September 7, 1988

Thomas-Sterry-Hunt International Ecological Reserve is an ecological reserve in Quebec, Canada. It was established on September 7, 1988.

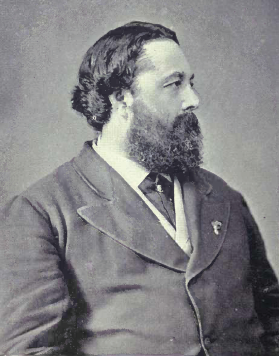
Thomas Sterry Hunt

The ecological reserve was named in honour of Thomas Sterry Hunt, F.R.S., an American geologist, who served as chief assistant to Sir William Edmond Logan, the director of the Canadian Geological Survey.

The reserve lies on the border with the Seboomook Lake territory of extreme northern Somerset County, Maine.
