= Canadian Oil Companies =

Canadian petroleum company (1908–1963)

- Industry: Petroleum
- Predecessor: Canadian Oil Company, Limited
- Founded: 4 December 1908
- Defunct: 24 May 1963
- Fate: Acquired by Shell Canada
- Headquarters: Canadian Oil Building, 188 University Ave, Toronto, Ontario
- Brands: White Rose Gasoline; En-Ar-Co Motor Oil

Canadian Oil Companies, Limited was a Canadian integrated petroleum company that existed from 1908 to 1963. The company was known best for the White Rose gasoline brand it sold across Canada. At the time of its sale to Shell Canada in 1962, Canadian Oil Companies was the country's last major domestically-owned petroleum company.

== History ==
The history of Canadian Oil Companies, Limited began in March 1904 when four oil companies from Southwestern Ontario amalgamated into a single holding company. The companies included in the amalgamation were the Canadian Consolidated Oil Company, Limited; the Canadian Oil Refining Company, Limited; the Sun Oil Refining Company of Hamilton, Limited; and the Grant Hamilton Oil Company of Toronto, Limited. The new holding company was named the Canadian Consolidated Oil Company, Limited and was headquartered in Toronto. On 4 April 1904, Canadian Consolidated changed its name to the Canadian Oil Company, Limited. The first president of the Canadian Oil Company was William Irwin.

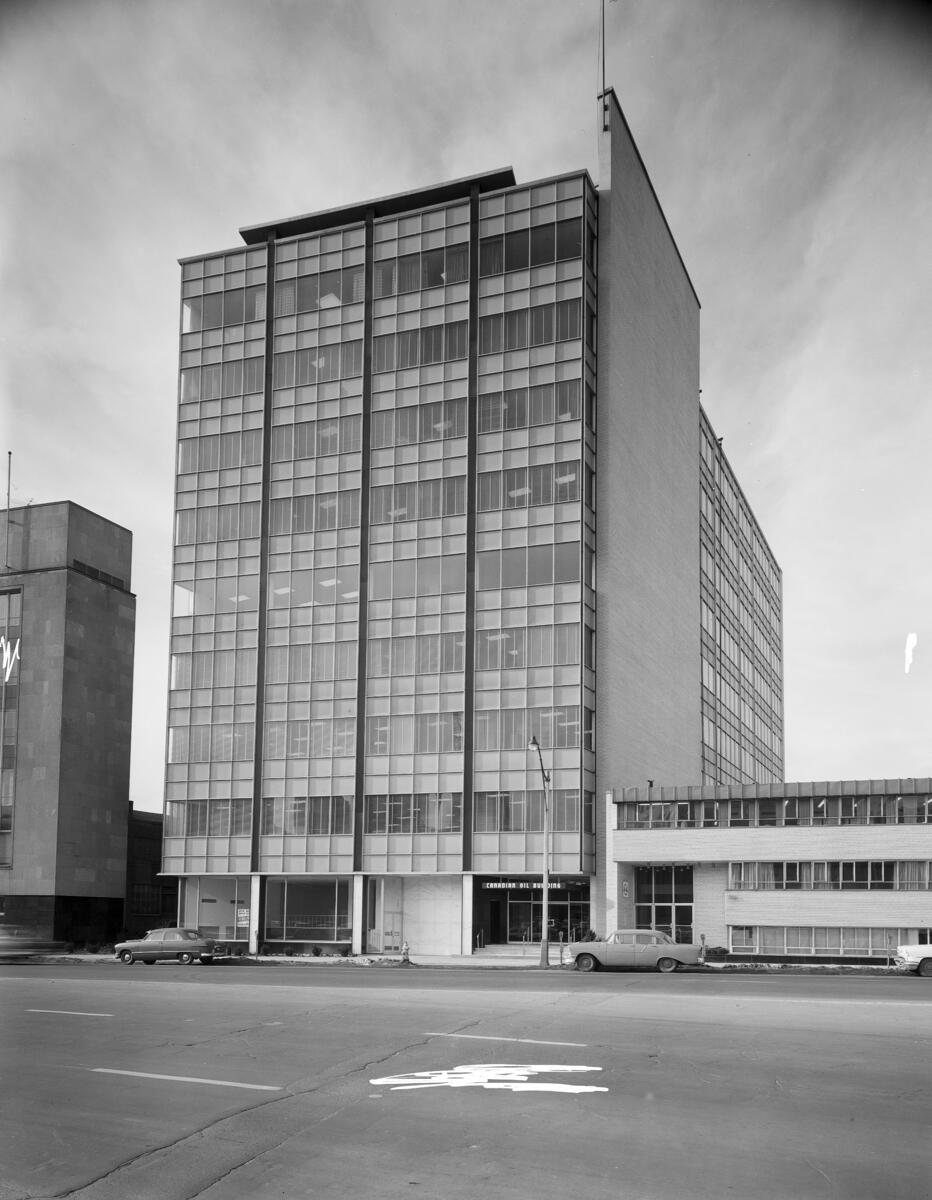
In 1958 the company moved into the new Canadian Oil Building at 188 University Ave, designed by Peter Caspari.

By 1908, the Canadian Oil Company had gone bankrupt. That year, the National Refining Company acquired Canadian Oil for $400,000. National had been incorporated in 1884 in Cleveland, Ohio and was founded by Julius I. Lamprecht (1853-1920). After the purchase, National reorganized the assets of Canadian Oil and on 4 December incorporated a new company called Canadian Oil Companies, Limited.

Under its American ownership, Canadian Oil Companies used the same product names and advertising schemes that National used in the United States. From the early 1910s Canadian sold White Rose Gasoline, En-Ar-Co Motor Oil, and Black Beauty Axle Grease. National Refining had conceived the name "White Rose" in 1890. It initially used the name for its stove gasoline and in 1905 began using it for automotive gasoline as well. For advertising Canadian used the "Boy and Slate" signs that Charles L. Archibold had conceived in 1920. In 1937 Canadian held a competition to design a new White Rose logo, and the winner was Bill Templeton. The "Boy and Slate" logo was phased out in 1939 and replaced with Templeton's new logo.

For many years Canadian Oil Companies had its head offices in the Terminal Building on the Toronto waterfront. While Canadian Oil was a tenant, the building displayed prominent White Rose Gasoline and En-Ar-Co Motor Oil signs on the roof. In June 1947 Canadian purchased the Goodyear Building at 204 Richmond Street West. The building was renamed the White Rose Building and Canadian Oil relocated its offices there in 1948. In 1956, the company announced that, upon completion, it would move to a new building at 188 University Avenue to be known as the Canadian Oil Building. The nine-storey office would be designed by Peter Caspari and owned by Canadawide Investments Ltd.

In December 1938, Nesbitt, Thomson and Company of Montreal purchased the controlling interest of Canadian Oil Companies from the National Refining Company. The sale became effective on 28 January 1939. The controlling interest consisted of around a third of the company's shares. This purchase made Canadian Oil Companies one of Canada's largest domestically-owned oil companies. Nesbitt, Thomson and Company later transferred its interest in Canadian Oil to its holding company, Power Corporation. By the early 1950s, 99 percent of Canadian Oil's shares were domestically owned.

=== Assets ===
==== Refineries ====
When Canadian Oil Companies formed in 1908, its main asset was the Petrolia Refinery that the Canadian Oil Refining Company had built in 1901. Canadian Oil closed the Petrolia Refinery in 1952. Concurrent with the closure of the Petrolia facilities, Canadian Oil built a new refinery at Corunna, Ontario, just south of Sarnia. On 25 September 1952, Liberal Member of Parliament C. D. Howe opened the new $23 million Sarnia facility.

In 1955, Canadian acquired the Anglo-Canadian Oil Company, Limited, headquartered in Calgary. With the acquisition of Anglo-Canadian, Canadian Oil obtained a fully developed exploration and development department in Western Canada. Canadian Oil continued to expand in the prairies when on 20 June 1961 it opened a new combined oil refinery and gas processing plant near Bowden, Alberta. The facility was officially opened by Premier Ernest Manning.

==== Ships ====
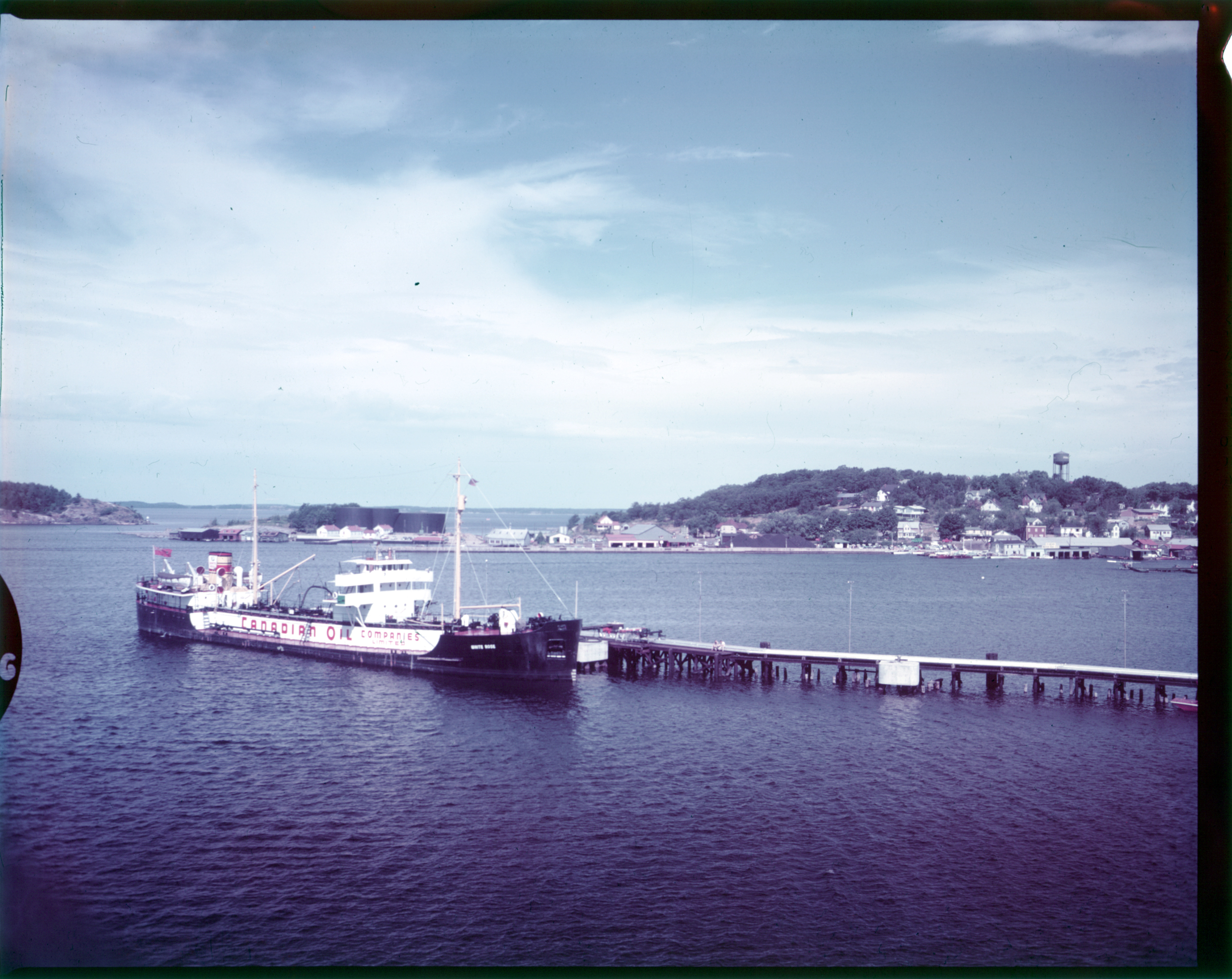
Tanker White Rose at Parry Sound in 1952.

During Canadian Oil Companies' life, it owned three oil tankers. In 1906, the Canadian Oil Company purchased a tanker that it named W. S. Calvert. It used the ship to transport oil from Toledo, Ohio to Froomfield, Ontario, where the oil was then transported by pipeline to the Petrolia Refinery. After the National Refining Company created Canadian Oil Companies in 1908, it renamed the ship the En-Ar-Co. Canadian continued to use the ship until 1934, when she was scrapped.

Canadian purchased its second ship in 1945. This ship, the Eglinton Park, had been built by Marine Industries Limited in Sorel, Quebec in 1944 for the Park Steamship Company. After the purchase, Canadian renamed her the John Irwin. In 1956, she was again renamed, this time the White Rose. In 1970 she was renamed the Fuel Marketer, and in 1979 was sold to Forand Marine Canada. She was scrapped in 1991.

In 1960, Canadian commissioned a new ship to complement the White Rose. This ship, the W. Harold Rea was built by Collingwood Shipbuilding and was Christened on 25 August 1962. After Canadian's acquisition by Shell in 1962, the Harold Rea was renamed the Eastern Shell II. Shell sold her in 1991 after which time she carried the names Le Crede, Colon Trader, and Cypress Point. She was scrapped in 2014.

=== Acquisition by Shell ===
In July 1962, Royal Dutch Shell, through a subsidiary called Hesper Oil Company Limited, submitted an offer to purchase Canadian Oil Companies, Limited for $39 per share. The board of directors rejected this offer. In September of that year two more purchase offers came to Canadian. The first was from the Hudson's Bay Oil and Gas Company, which offered shareholders two common shares and one 5.5 percent cumulative convertible share in the continuing company. The second offer was from Shell, this time through another subsidiary called Shell Investments Limited, and proposed a purchase at $52.20 per share. On Tuesday, 25 September the board of directors recommended proceeding with the Shell offer. The offer was ultimately accepted by Power Corporation, the controlling shareholder. On 12 October, Shell Investments mailed its formal offer to shareholders. Shell's acquisition included Canadian's refineries in Sarnia and Bowden, two tanker ships, 150 storage tanks, and 3,000 White Rose gas stations. The company's value at the time was around $125 million.

The takeover of Canadian by Shell followed several other American acquisitions of major domestic oil companies. Earlier in 1962, British American Oil, which was controlled by Gulf Oil, acquired the Anglo American Exploration Company and the Royalite Oil Company, both based in Calgary. The purchase of Canadian elicited considerable anxiety throughout the country. On 3 October the matter was discussed in the House of Commons. New Democratic member H. W. Herridge suggested a delay in the acquisition and asked if Prime Minister John Diefenbaker would urge the directors of Canadian to "put Canada first". Diefenbaker replied that "it is beyond the jurisdiction of the government to act in his behalf, however desirous all Canadians are that ownership and management of our resources be in Canadian hands." Before the sale was finalised, the Calgary Herald opined that "another part of Canada seems about to slip through Canadian fingers. [...] As regrettable as the situation may be in terms of our nationhood, it seems scarcely reasonable to expect that the shareholders will reject the offer. One offer from Shell was refused, but it was inevitable that a more attractive price would be offered for this last major Canadian-controlled, integrated oil company in the Dominion."

== Legacy ==
In 1955, Canadian Oil Companies purchased the site in Oil Springs, Ontario where in 1858 James Miller Williams drilled the first commercial oil well in North America. In 1957, it donated the site for the construction of the Oil Museum of Canada; the museum opened in 1960 and continues to operate today.

Both refineries that Canadian built still exist. Shell Canada has continued to use the Sarnia refinery since 1962. The Bowden oil refinery closed in 2001, although the gas processing plant continued to run. In 2018, Gen III Oil Corporation signed a deal with the refinery's owner, Parkland Refining Limited, to convert the oil facilities into a re-refinery.

On his 1995 album Drive-In Movie, Fred Eaglesmith recorded the song "White Rose". The lyrics include the line "I guess the White Rose filling station is just a memory now".

== Presidents ==
1. Julius I. Lamprecht, 1908–1920
2. Frank B. Fretter, 1920–1935
3. Frank Harrison Littlefield, 1935–1939
4. John Irwin, 1939–1949
5. William Harold Rea, 1949–1962
