= Hugh Shaw =

Hugh Shaw may refer to:

- Hugh Shaw (British Army officer) (1839–1904), recipient of the Victoria Cross
- Hugh Shaw (footballer, born 1896) (1896–1976), Scottish football player and manager (Hibernian)
- Hugh Shaw (footballer, born 1929), Scottish football player (Tranmere Rovers)
- Hugh Murray Shaw (1876–1934), farmer, rancher and Canadian federal politician
- Hugh Nixon Shaw (1812–1863), Irish-Canadian oil producer and businessman
