= John Stevens (Wisconsin inventor) =

American miller and inventor in Wisconsin (1840–1920)

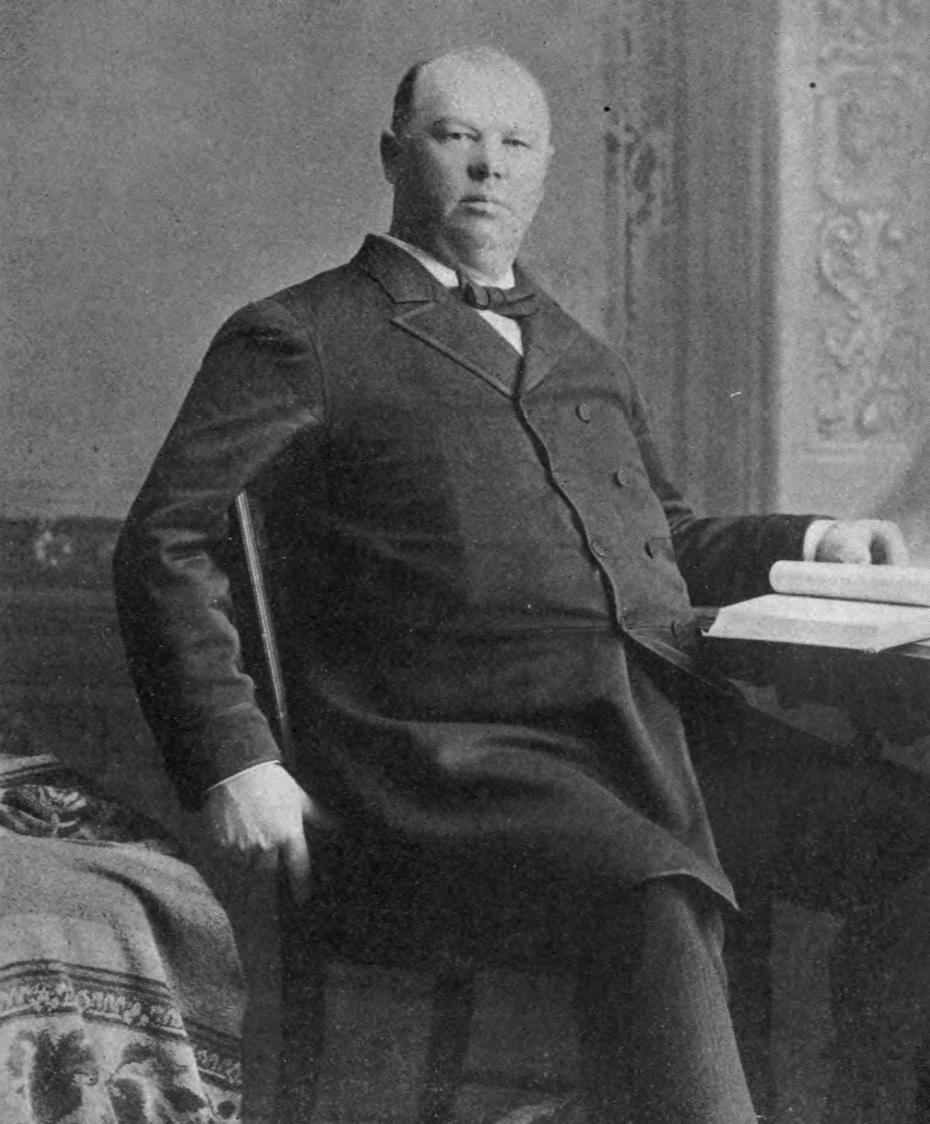
- Born: December 4, 1840; Llechryd, Cardiganshire, Wales
- Died: August 5, 1920 (aged 79); Neenah, Wisconsin
- Occupation: Flour miller
- Known for: Invention of the roller mill

John Stevens (December 4, 1840 – August 5, 1920) was a miller and inventor who lived in Neenah, Wisconsin. His inventions in flour milling revolutionized the process, leading to large-scale shifts in wheat-growing regions, and to the predominance of particular milling companies and mill-equipment manufacturers. Today Patent flour is still referred to due to Stevens' patents.

== Early life ==
John Stevens was born in Llechryd, Cardiganshire, Wales on December 4, 1840, the son of John and Elizabeth Bowen Stevens. His father was a landscape gardener. In 1854 they emigrated to the United States, settling in Neenah. Neenah at that time was a major flour milling center, and Wisconsin was a leading wheat growing state. As a teenager, young John went to work in the mills to help support his family.

In 1860, Stevens started work at a mill owned by John Mills on the upper race. Here he met his future partner, Tom Oborn. Through a series of consolidations and growth, Stevens eventually bought this mill and an adjacent mill, the combined mills known as Clement & Stevens.

== Background of the invention ==
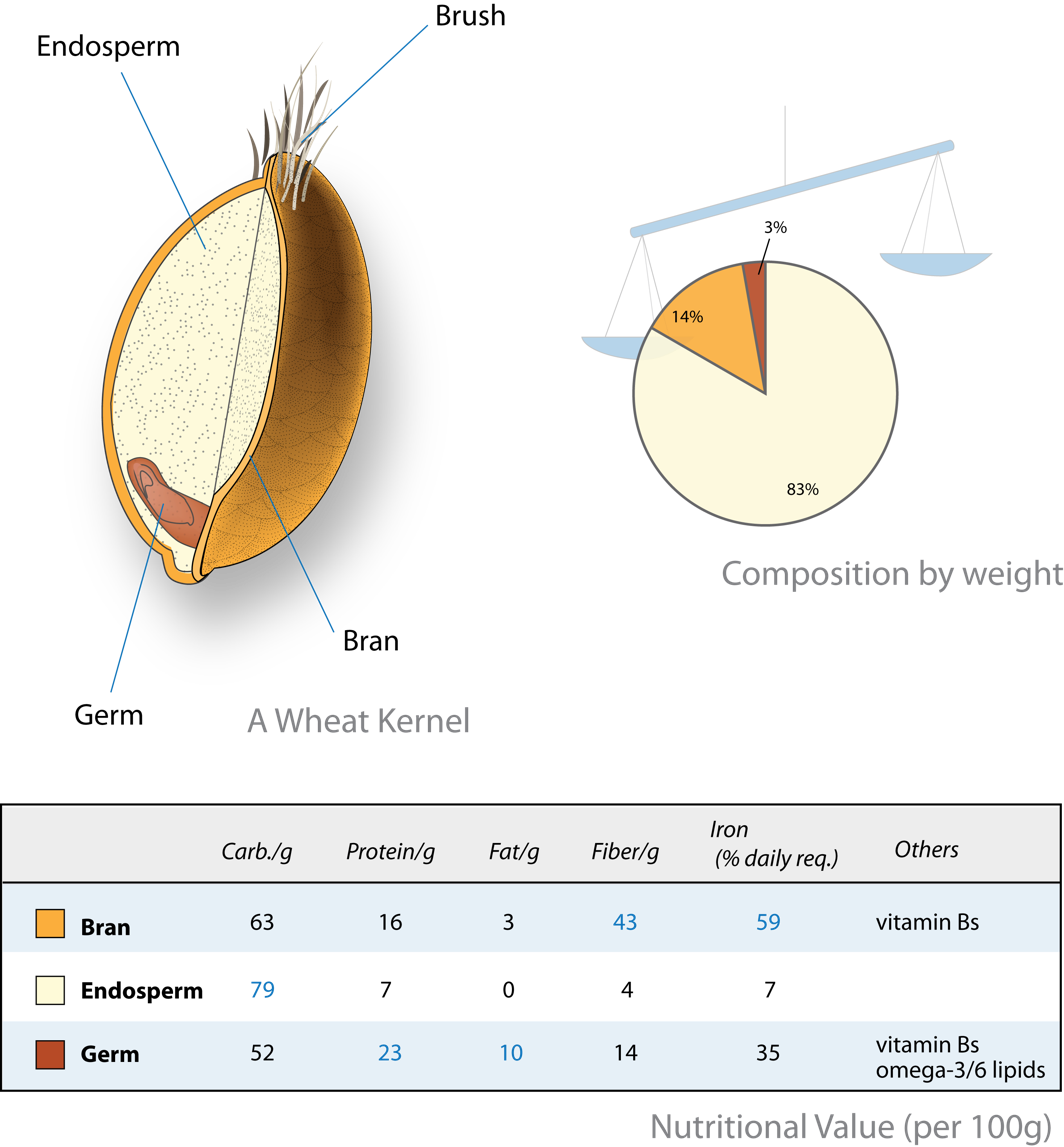

Wheat and other grains grow on a stalk and have an outer covering known as chaff which is not nutritional to humans. The essential grain is a hard berry that is separated from the chaff. However, even this hard berry is composed of several layers which are of varying use as a component of flour. The most desirable part of a wheat berry is the endosperm, a protein-rich nutrient whose natural purpose (like all fruits) is to give nutrition to the seed when it is planted. In order to extract this endosperm, the tiny outer shell — which is the bran — needs to be cracked open and separated from the endosperm. In most processes, but especially in the old stone mill process, some amount of ground bran always made its way into the flour which discolored it − and in Stevens' day the whiter the flour, the more value it had in the market. The reverse was also true: useful endosperm adhered to the bran pieces that were discarded (or used as animal feed). The basic problem of milling is to correctly separate these pieces. Even in the modern market where high-fiber bran is mixed back into the flour to create whole wheat flour, it is still highly desirable to control this process through proper separation of the components.

Traditionally for centuries, wheat was ground into flour using stones. While the characteristics of the stones and the manner in which they were used and maintained evolved over time, the same basic process never changed. In the mid 19th Century stones generally came from France, and were cut and dressed to have grooves in them, so that they both gently cracked the wheat and ground bits and pieces that mixed into the flour. In addition to flour purity, other considerations included not heating the flour while it was being ground. In general the process of creating and maintaining a proper face on the stone — known as "dressing" the stone — was more of an art than a science.

== The invention of the roller mill ==
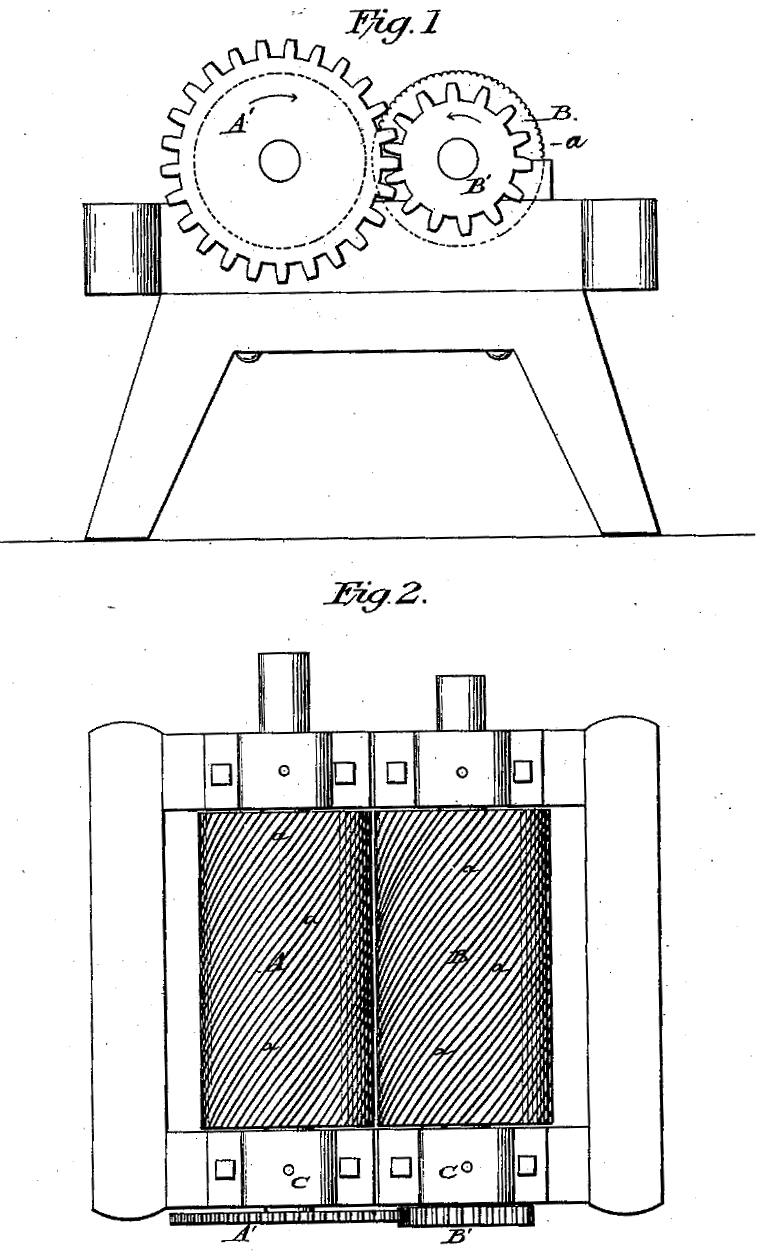
Figures from US Patent 225,770

Stevens' partner Tom Oborn had a method to dress the stones that was non-traditional, but developed a higher yield. One part of dressing the stone consisted of "picking" whereby typically the faces were chipped and roughened slightly. Oborn instead left the surfaces in a smooth state, but otherwise adjusted the width of the stones and their speed to compensate. Stevens surmised that Oborn's process did less crushing of the outer shell, but instead gently cracked the berry open and dumped out the endosperm. It was from this analysis that Stevens arrived at his invention idea.

Between 1870 and 1872, Stevens tried a number of models, including wooden rollers, but became convinced that rollers made from steel would best provide the type of cracking necessary. In order to prove the point, Stevens needed an actual device and he had some difficulty finding a machine shop who could manufacture steel rolls that had sufficient length and diameter, eventually employing the firm of Farrell and Sons in Ansonia, Connecticut. Once the rolls were made, Stevens developed systems to feed the wheat into the rolls, and he optimized the yield by experimenting with speeds and roller-to-roller distances. In time he was able to improve the yield of the mill from 200 barrels a day using the stone process, to 500 barrels a day using the steel roller process, with the same amount of water power. In addition to this yield per horsepower, the flour yield per bushel of raw wheat also increased.

Almost immediately the mill began benefiting financially from the new process, which Stevens and his associates attempted to keep secret but which was copied by rivals nevertheless, as they learned about it through various subterfuge. In order to protect his rights to the invention, in 1877 Stevens applied for a patent, and in 1880 was awarded US Patent number 225,770: Grain-Crushing Roll. The claims of this patent were:

1. A combination of rolls geared to roll at different speeds, with parallel grooves with flat plane surfaces, with the grooves crossed.
2. A combination of rolls geared to roll at different speeds, with parallel grooves with flat plane surfaces, with the grooved surfaces running in the same direction.

These claims covered most of the important aspects of the invention (differential speed, plane surfaces at fixed distance to optimally crack the berry, crossed grooves), but was not sufficient to protect all he had done, so subsequently, Stevens applied for several other additional patents, to cover the aspect of continuous reduction (re-crushing of the bran) and separation.

As noted above, despite attempts to keep the invention secret, the design leaked out. With his patents issued, Stevens was able to get patent royalties from mills all over the country, especially the mills whose business was surging in Minneapolis. He also received international patents in Canada, Germany, Austria-Hungary and the United Kingdom.

== Other Stevens patents ==
Stevens was awarded a total of nineteen patents in his career. These were for inventions in other areas of grain milling not directly related to the roller-mill inventions, as well as inventions unrelated to grain milling altogether.

== Stevens' retirement and the Wisconsin flour mill legacy ==
Stevens sold the rights to his inventions in 1893 and retired from the flour mill business. He built and lived in the largest mansion on Wisconsin Avenue in Neenah. He died on August 5, 1920.

Largely as a result of the revolutionary roller mill process, wheat production in Wisconsin plummeted to insignificance and the flour mills in Neenah all closed. This was due to the fact that the new process was much more well-suited to milling of spring wheat which could be grown cheaply on the plains and prairies of Minnesota and the Dakotas. However the effect in Minnesota, as the Minneapolis mills such as Pillsbury and General Mills adopted the process, led to dramatic growth in that state. By 1889 Minnesota was the number one wheat growing state in the United States.

Neenah did not in general suffer economically due to these changes however, because the water power on the Fox River was still valuable. Soon paper mills replaced the flour mills, for example, and well into the 21st Century the Fox River Valley remains one of the top paper producing areas in the world. There were other additional benefits to the economy of the state of Wisconsin, one being that the Edward P. Allis Company was one of the few manufacturers who were capable of producing the rollers and auxiliary equipment for the mills, and that company grew rapidly in the latter half of the 19th Century, diversifying from these early flour mill products into a large portfolio of mining and milling products. The Edward P. Allis Company was the forerunner of Allis-Chalmers. Another major effect on the economy of northern Wisconsin came when a consortium of the newly-wealthy Minneapolis millers formed the Soo line railroad for the purpose of shipping their flour products more directly to the east coast and Europe. In the hey day of the logging industry, the Soo Line provided a cheaper, faster and more direct means for lumberjacks and suppliers to reach the lumber camps. Previously these employees and supplies would have to be taken long distances over rough tote roads by wagon, sleigh or on foot.

== John Stevens' patents ==
List of patents
- US225770, Stevens, John, "Grain-Crushing Roll", issued March 23, 1880
- US230834, Stevens, John, "Grinding Mill", issued August 3, 1880
- US236104, Stevens, John, "Grinding Mill", issued December 28, 1880
- US236272, Stevens, John; Davis, John R. Jr., "Grain Heater", issued January 4, 1881
- US236643, Stevens, John, "Grinding Mill", issued December 11, 1881
- US240282, Stevens, John, "Grinding Mill", issued April 18, 1881
- US252705, Stevens, John, "Mill For Grinding and Reducing Grain, &tc", issued January 24, 1882
- US268567, Stevens, John, "Grinding Mill", issued December 5, 1882
- US278193, Stevens, John, "Automatic Grain Weighing Machine", issued May 22, 1883
- US278194, Stevens, John, "Automatic Grain Weighing Machine", issued May 22, 1883
- US288598, Stevens, John, "Fountain Brush", issued November 13, 1883
- US304468, Stevens, John, "Roller Mill", issued September 2, 1884
- US307877, Stevens, John, "Dampening Brush", issued November 11, 1884
- US307878, Stevens, John, "Bottle For Holding and Applying Blacking, &tc.", issued November 11, 1884
- US325282, Stevens, John, "Automatic Weighing Machine", issued September 1, 1885
- US370097, Stevens, John, "Roller Mill", issued September 20, 1887
- US384648, Stevens, John, "Pump", issued June 19, 1888
- US397946, Stevens, John, "Fountain Brush", issued February 19, 1889
- US407699, Stevens, John, "Pump", issued July 23, 1889
