= Llechryd =

Village in Ceredigion, Wales

Coordinates: 52.06°N 4.60°W

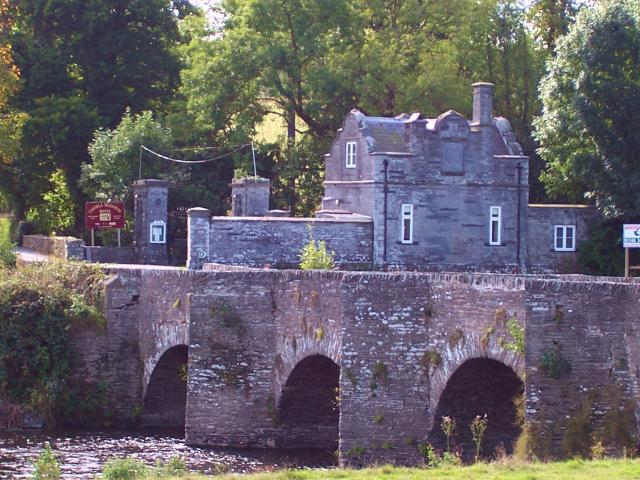
- River Teifi, Llechryd Bridge; Castell Malgwyn entrance

- Location within Ceredigion
- OS grid reference: SN217438
- Principal area: Ceredigion
- Preserved county: Dyfed
- Country: Wales
- Sovereign state: United Kingdom
- Post town: CARDIGAN
- Postcode district: SA43
- Dialling code: 01239
- Police: Dyfed-Powys
- Fire: Mid and West Wales
- Ambulance: Welsh
- UK Parliament: Ceredigion Preseli
- Senedd Cymru – Welsh Parliament: Ceredigion Penfro

Llechryd (Welsh pronunciation: [ɬɛxrɪd]) is a rural village on the A484 road approximately 3 miles (4.8 km) from Cardigan, Ceredigion, Wales. Situated on the north bank of the tidal River Teifi, Llechryd is the first point upstream of Cardigan where crossing is possible. Most of the village has developed along the A484, with some estates branching off into the valley.

It is part of the community of Llangoedmor.

== Etymology ==
The name Llechryd translates from the Welsh for "Slate Ford" (Llech Rhyd).

== History ==
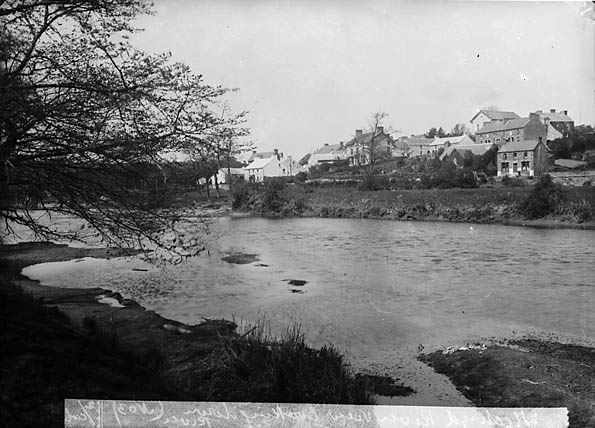
Llechryd (c 1885)

A battle was fought in or near the village in 1087 between Rhys ap Tewdwr and the sons of Bleddin ab Cynfyn.

In 1844, during the Rebecca Riots, the weir across the Teifi built to prevent salmon from going upstream was demolished by rioters.

St Tydfil's church was built in 1877–8 to replace the older Church of the Holy Cross near the bridge which had to be abandoned due to persistent flooding. Another notable church nearby is Manordeifi Old Church, near the far end of the "canal" road. It is preserved as it was in the early 19th century. The canal was not a transport canal, rather a leat supplying water to the tinworks which stood behind the Castell Malgwyn stable block on the southern bank of the river. This leat collected water from the Teifi just to the north of Manordeifi Church, as seen on the 1842 Manordeifi Tithe map. A weir is still evident at this spot. In March 2006, staff from the Survey Branch of RCAHMW carried out survey and analysis of the Castell Malgwyn Tinplate works.

The Teifi is tidal and used to be navigable by lighters as far as Llechryd. During the 1840s, careless working of the slate quarries resulted in a severe choking of the Cilgerran Gorge, causing the flooding for which the area is now known, and the moving of the navigable tidal limit (in all but the smallest boats/canoes) downstream of Cilgerran Castle. In his book from 1867, The History of Cilgerran, John Roland Phillips wrote:

Under the castle, and at the influx of the Brook Plysgog into the Teivi, a great quantity of rubbish and débris seems to have been swept away by floods from quarries on the river's banks, and having settled in the current near to what was formerly a green island, has raised the bed of the river and rendered the navigation thereof during dry seasons, and at low water, rather difficult.

There is a disused mill and associated buildings on the Nant Arberth; these buildings are now residential properties. Much closer to the Teifi, but still on the Nant Arberth below Glanarberth, are the remains of a much older mill's infrastructure. The remains of the dam are still in situ, with at least three 2-foot-thick walls sandwiching 2-foot-thick clay infill. The leat that this feeds is some 200m long and is situated to the west of the Nant Arberth. About half of the leat is still visible. The mill itself was situated closer to the A484, approximately where the house Glannau is now; the mill building can be seen in a photograph taken from the west side of the bridge, dated circa 1868. The outfall from the mill crossed beneath the A484 parallel to the Nant Arberth, then fed into it, prior to entering the Teifi. The position of the dam, the leat, and the mill can be seen on the 1841 Llechryd Tithe map.

Due to the village's closeness to the port of Cardigan, many large houses were built nearby by wealthy merchants and sea captains. These include Cilbronnau, Noyadd Wilym, Coedmore, Glanolmarch, Pengraig, Castell Malgwyn, Glanarberth, Manor Eifed, Penylan, Llwynduris, Blaen-Pant, and Stradmore.

== Llechryd Bridge ==
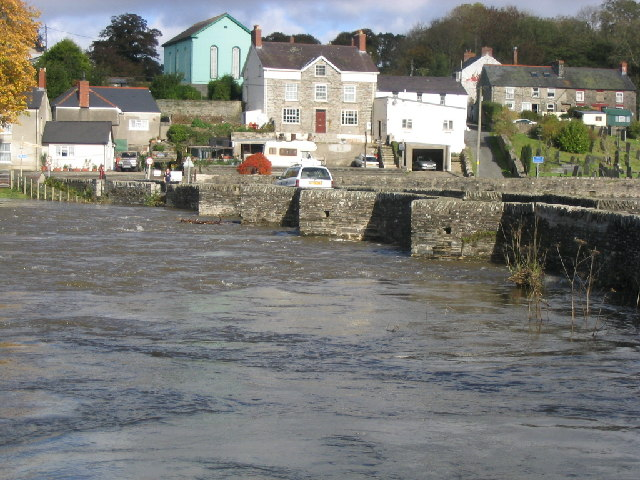
River in flood in 2004

A bridge at Llechryd is marked on Christopher Saxton's map of Radnor, Brecknok, Cardigan et Caermarden of 1579, on which the village is marked as Capel Langbrid.

The River Teifi is crossed at Llechryd by a grade II* listed bridge built in the 17th century. The bridge, part of an ancient drovers' road, may be wholly submerged at times of high water or heavy rain, necessitating travelling to Cardigan or Cenarth to cross the river A flood in December 2015 when flood-waters covered the bridge entirely, damaged the bridge.

== Notable people ==
- John Stevens (1840–1920), was a miller and inventor of the roller-flour mill. He emigrated to the United States in 1854 and lived in Neenah, Wisconsin. His inventions there in flour milling revolutionized the process.
- In 1974, a Welsh coracle piloted by Bernard Thomas (ca.1923–2014) of Llechryd crossed the English Channel to France in 13 1/2 hours. The journey was undertaken to demonstrate how the Bull Boats of the Mandan Indians of North Dakota could have been copied from coracles introduced by Prince Madog in the 12th century.
- Lewis Vaughan Jones (1981–), journalist and news television presenter

== Teifi Trout Association ==
The Teifi Trout Association (TTA) owns the trout fishing rights from the eastern side of the bridge upstream, although some plots of land by the river are privately owned.

== Sport ==
The village football club is Llechryd F.C. who currently play in the Ceredigion League First Division.
