= Oil Museum of Canada =

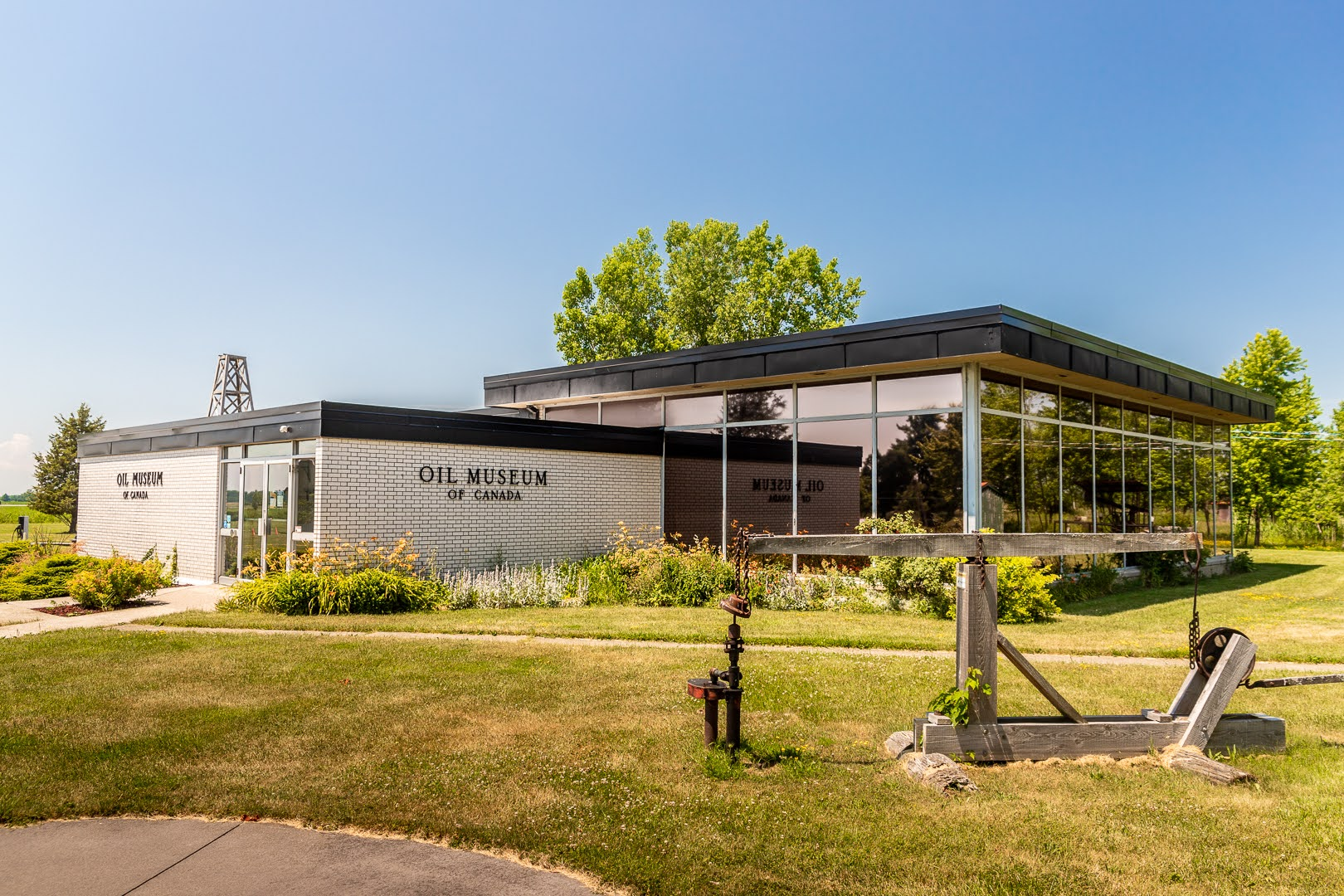
- The Oil Museum of Canada
- Established: July 1, 1960; 66 years ago
- Location: 2423 Kelly Road, P.O. Box 16; Oil Springs, Ontario, Canada; N0N 1P0
- Coordinates: 42°46′24″N 82°07′15″W
- Type: History museum
- Website: https://www.lambtonmuseums.ca/oil/

The Oil Museum of Canada, is a petroleum heritage museum in Oil Springs, Ontario, Canada. The museum is located on the site where James Miller Williams dug the first commercial oil well on the continent in 1858.

The museum's property, and the lands surrounding it were designated as the "First Commercial Oil Field National Historic Site of Canada" in 1925. The museum itself was opened to the public in July 1960 and renovated from 2021 to 2022.

== History ==
Interest for an oil museum that paid tribute to Canada's early oil history in Lambton County began to surface in 1955 when Canadian Oil Companies Ltd. purchased the land where James Miller Williams established North America's first commercial oil well. In 1957, a panel made up of members of the Lambton County Historical Society and the Oil Springs Centennial Committee developed plans for a $100,000 Museum that would preserve the site of the first commercial well and tell the stories of the oldest oil-producing area in North America. The County of Lambton, Oil Springs and various local petrochemical companies financed the project, and Canadian Oil Companies Ltd donated William's former property to the museum committee. Construction began in 1959, and the museum officially opened on July 1, 1960. The museum building was designed by Forbes & Rutherford of Sarnia. Lieutenant- Governor John Keiller MacKay hosted the museum's opening ceremony, noting that "we should hold an enduring reverence and respect for the pioneers, who laid the foundations for the oil development in this area."

In 2021 the museum was closed to the public to allow a $1-million renovation of the main building. The museum reopened in May 2022.

== Collection ==
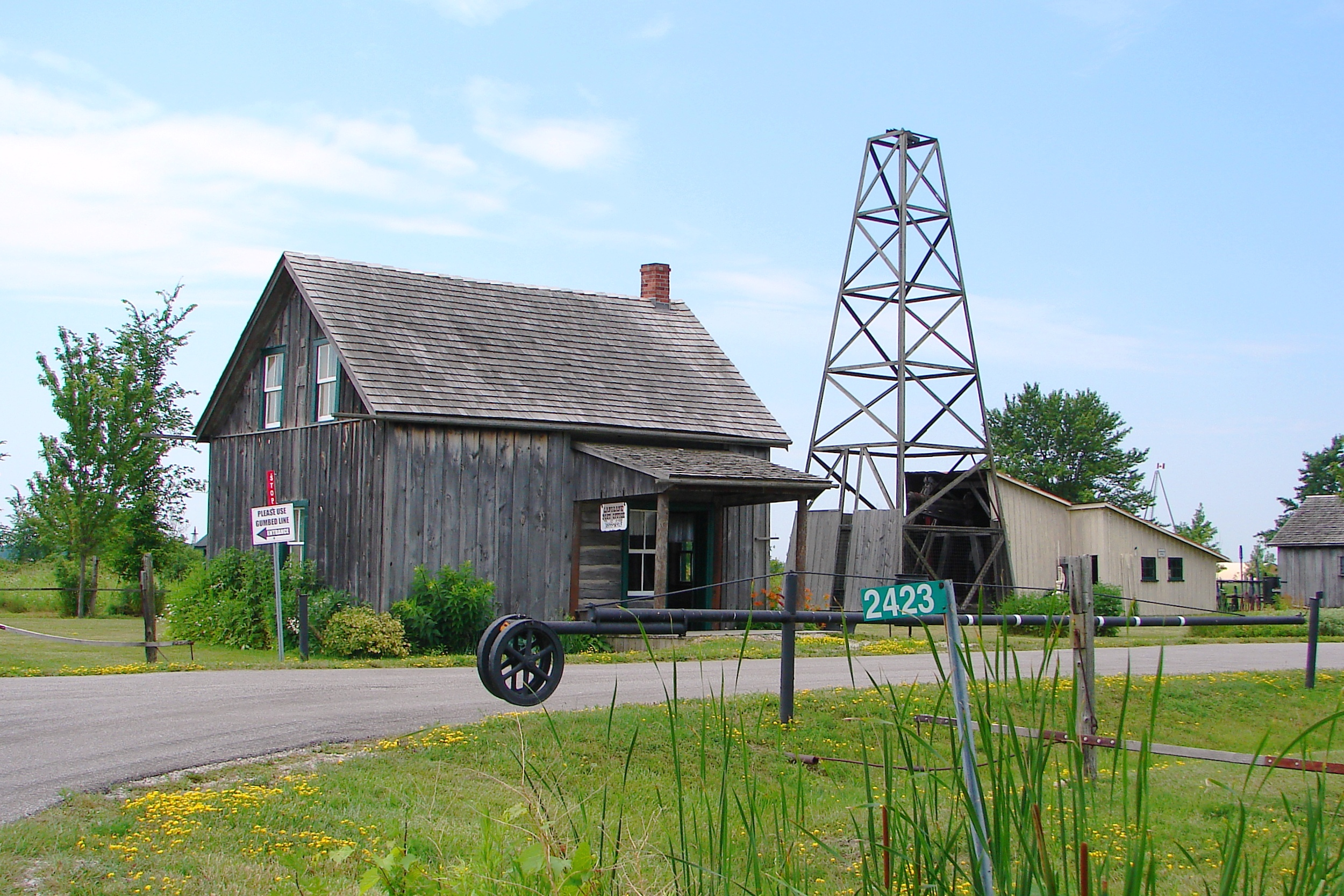
A drilling rig and historic building at the museum's outdoor exhibit

The Oil Museum of Canada's exhibits contain petroleum industry artifacts, historic photographs, geological displays and the souvenirs of the 'foreign drillers' who roamed the world in search of oil. The outside exhibits include Canadian drilling rigs, a demonstration of the jerker line pumping system, a nineteenth century oil wagon and original buildings from the boom period.

The Oil Museum of Canada's website includes a virtual exhibit that allows users to explore Lambton County's early oil history through the stories of Oil Springs and Petrolia's prominent historical figures.

== See also ==
- List of museums in Ontario
- List of National Historic Sites of Canada in Ontario
- List of petroleum and gas museums
