= John Shaw (oil driller) =

American oil driller (c.1831–1871)

- Born: c. 1831
- Died: July 1871; Petrolia, Ontario, Canada West
- Occupation: Oil producer

John Shaw (c. 1831-July 1871) was an American oil driller, businessman and photographer. Shaw is best known for striking Canada's first oil gusher at Oil Springs on January 16, 1862. Shaw's oil gusher marked the beginning of the first oil boom in Enniskillen Township, as speculators rushed to Oil Springs seeking similar fortunes.

== Biography ==
=== The Shaw gusher ===
John Shaw was likely born in Port Huron, Michigan, and immigrated to Kingston, Province of Canada, before arriving in Enniskillen Township sometime in the early 1860s. Reportedly, after failing to find oil at a well somewhere in Enniskillen, Shaw travelled to Oil Springs in June 1861 and began to dig another well. For roughly seven months, Shaw worked the well despite not finding any oil. By January 1862, the oil venture had bankrupted him. According to reports at the time, on January 16, the day Shaw discovered the gusher, a local store refused to allow him to buy a pair of boots on credit. Following the embarrassing encounter, Shaw reportedly decided that if he was unsuccessful in striking oil by the end of the day, he would give up oil drilling and leave Enniskillen Township. Shaw then hit oil after digging through fifty feet of clay and drilling through 158 feet of rock. The blast shot oil 20 feet in the air and yielded 1,500 barrels for several days before dropping down to 670 barrels after the flow was contained by a system of pipes and oil tanks. In the four days it took to calm the flow, it is likely that thousands of barrels were lost as oil ran uncontrolled into the Black Creek. In the aftermath of Shaw's discovery, speculators rushed to Oil Springs, and there were an additional thirty-two wells drilled by the end of 1862.

After producing roughly 35,000 barrels of oil, the Shaw well petered out in early 1863 alongside 30 other wells in Oil Springs. The almost universal cessation of flowing oil in Oil Springs ended the region's first boom period as producers turned their attention to the question of supply.

=== Later life and death ===
On May 11, 1866, the Sarnia Observer reported that Shaw established another well near the original gusher's location to "give the old spot another good try over again."

On July 21, 1871, the Sarnia Observer reported that Shaw died in Petrolia. According to the obituary, Shaw had been struggling to make a living after the Shaw Well petered out and died in abject poverty.

== Shaw gusher controversy ==
Although the majority historical sources up into the 1940s credited John Shaw with the discovery of Canada's first gusher, contemporary scholarship often miscredits the discovery to Hugh Nixon Shaw, another oil producer who lived in Enniskillen Township. The confusion over who struck the Shaw gusher began with historian Robert Harkness, who claimed in his 1940 publication Makers of Oil History: 1850–1880 that a series of articles from the Toronto Globe named the discoverer as Hugh Nixon Shaw. In fact, the articles he cited were written months before the gusher was struck and discuss Hugh Nixon Shaw's distillation process. When the Toronto Globe began reporting on the gusher in January 1862, they identified the discoverer as a "Mr. Shaw, lately of Port Huron, Michigan, a daugerrean artist, and formerly of Kingston West," a description that fits John Shaw, not Hugh Nixon Shaw. Moreover, on February 5, 1862, the Globe directly credited John Shaw as the discoverer of the well. Despite Harkness' mistakes, his research influenced the work of other historians and journalists, who began to cite Hugh Nixon Shaw as the one responsible for Canada's first gusher.
