= Geological Survey of Newfoundland and Labrador =

Government operated scientific research agency

Agency overview
- Formed: 1864
- Jurisdiction: Government of Newfoundland and Labrador
- Headquarters: St. John's, Newfoundland
- Annual budget: approx. $5,000,000 CAD
- Minister responsible: Lloyd Parrott, Minister of Energy and Mines
- Agency executive: John Hinchey, Director
- Website: Official Website

The Geological Survey of Newfoundland and Labrador is a scientific research agency that is part of the Department of Energy and Mines of the Government of Newfoundland and Labrador. It is the agency responsible for performing geological mapping and surveying which provides geological maps, reports, and mineral analysis, and for developing Newfoundland and Labrador's natural resources and protecting the environment.

The Geological Survey is a division of the Mines Branch. The Survey currently has 5 sections (Regional Geology; Mineral Deposits; Geochemistry, Geophysics and Terrain Sciences; Geoscience Data Management and Geoscience Publications and Information) and a geochemical laboratory.

== History ==
The first geological surveys of Newfoundland were begun as early as 1839 by Joseph Jukes. It was, however, in 1864 that the first systematic geological investigations began, when the Geological Survey of Newfoundland was inaugurated by Sir William Logan, who, on request of the colonial government appointed Alexander Murray as director. Murray and his assistant (and eventual successor), James Howley, were pioneering geologists whose work formed the basis for the first geological map of Newfoundland, published in 1907. After Howley's death in 1909, the Survey was temporarily disbanded. It was resurrected in 1926 under H.A. Baker, but it was not until the 1930s, under the leadership of Government Geologist A.K. Snelgrove, working at Princeton University, that the Geological Survey was revived and a continuous series of geological investigations commenced within the country's Department of Natural Resources.
