= Hugh Nixon Shaw =

Irish-Canadian oil producer and businessman

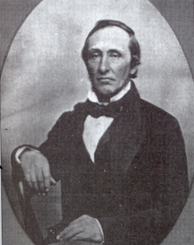
- Born: 1812; Near Dublin, United Kingdom of Great Britain and Ireland
- Died: February 11, 1863 (aged 50–51); Oil Springs, Ontario, Canada West
- Cause of death: Asphyxiation
- Occupation(s): Oil producer and businessman

Hugh Nixon Shaw (1812 – February 11, 1863) is an Irish-Canadian oil producer and businessman. Shaw is best known for being misidentified as the discoverer of the Shaw well, Canada's first oil gusher, on January 16, 1862.

== Biography ==
Hugh Nixon Shaw was born near Dublin, Ireland, in 1812. At some point, Shaw emigrated to Canada West and operated a general store in Cooksville, before moving to Enniskillen Township sometime in the late 1850s or early 1860s. Shaw became a successful oil producer, patenting a distilling process that made oil less volatile. Shaw defined his process as applying heat and benzol to remove the impurities out of the oil. Shaw operated a refinery until it burnt down in May 1862.

On February 11, 1863, Shaw died checking the status of one of his oil wells. According to one of his employees, he asked two workers to lower him into his well to grab hold of a pipe that had gotten loose. After fixing the pipe and calling out to be hauled back up, Shaw began coughing and fell backwards into the oil well. An autopsy revealed that Shaw died of asphyxiation from the poisonous gases inside the well.

== Shaw gusher controversy ==
Contemporary historians and journalists often miscredit Hugh Nixon Shaw as the discoverer of Canada's first oil gusher. The real founder was John Shaw, another oil producer in Enniskillen Township. The confusion over who struck the gusher appears to have arisen from historian Robert Harkness, who claimed in his 1940 publication Makers of Oil History: 1850–1880 that a series of articles in the Toronto Globe credited Hugh Nixon Shaw with the discovery. In fact, the articles Harkness cited were written months before the gusher was struck, and only discuss Hugh Nixon Shaw's distillation process. When the Globe began reporting on the gusher in January 1862, they identified the discoverer as a "Mr. Shaw, lately of Port Huron, Michigan, a daugerrean artist, and formerly of Kingston West," a description that fits John Shaw, not Hugh Nixon Shaw. Moreover, on February 5, 1862, the Globe directly credited John Shaw as the discoverer of the well. Despite Harkness' error, his research had a significant impact on other historians and journalists, who began citing Hugh Nixon Shaw as the discoverer of the Shaw gusher.
