= William Edmond Logan =

British-Canadian geologist

Sir William Edmond Logan FRSE FRS FGS
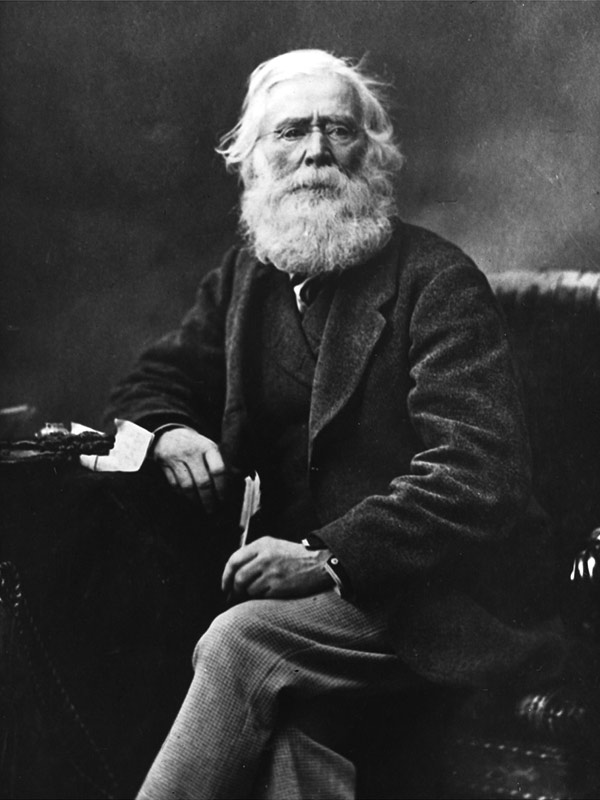
- Sir William Edmond Logan (1869)
- Born: 20 April 1798; Montreal, Lower Canada, British Empire
- Died: 22 June 1875 (aged 77); Castell Malgwyn, Wales
- Education: University of Edinburgh
- Known for: "Geology of Canada" (1863)
- Awards: Wollaston Medal (1856); Royal Medal (1867)
- Scientific career
- Fields: Geology
- Workplaces: Director of the Geological Survey of Canada (1842–69)

Sir William Edmond Logan, FRSE FRS FGS (20 April 1798 – 22 June 1875), was a Canadian-born geologist and the founder and first director of the Geological Survey of Canada.

== Life ==
William Edmond Logan was born into a well-to-do Montreal family in 1798, the third son of William Logan, a baker and owner of real estate, and Janet Edmond, both originally from Scotland.

Logan was sent to Edinburgh to receive an education. As was common at the time for young men of means, he learned several languages (French, Spanish, some Gaelic and German), music (flute), and became an accomplished artist. In the 1830s, Logan became fascinated with geology while managing a copper-smelting works near Swansea, Wales, on behalf of his uncle, Hart Logan. His self-taught talent for the subject soon brought his geological maps and interpretations to the attention of the most eminent geologists of Great Britain, and it was their later recommendations that clinched Logan's appointment as the founding director of the Geological Survey of Canada (GSC).

The need for an organization that could chart the mineral resources of the newly established Province of Canada (following the merger of Upper and Lower Canada) had been under discussion for over a decade. Government funds were allocated in 1841 and Logan took up his duties in 1842.

By the spring of 1843, Logan had established the Survey's headquarters in what he described as a "small and dark room" in Montreal. He had also hired Scottish-born Alexander Murray, a former naval officer, as his assistant. The rapid industrial advances in England since the late 18th century had shown how essential coal was to economic expansion. With the accepted belief that North America's destiny lay in applying industrial technology to rich natural resources, the search for coal became the Survey's first priority.

The 1843 field season saw Logan working between Pictou, Nova Scotia, and the Gaspé, as well as Murray between Lake Erie and Lake Huron. The following year, Logan mapped the north shore of the Gaspé Peninsula and then explored inland to the mountains along the Cap Chat River. Logan's assistants named the highest peak in his honour (this Mount Logan is not to be confused with Canada's highest mountain, which is located in Yukon and also named for him).

Based on information gathered during the first two field seasons, Logan was able to report that no coal deposits were to be found in the Province of Canada. Logan's conclusion undoubtedly made the idea of amalgamating with the coal-rich Maritime Provinces attractive, and was one of the factors leading to Confederation in 1867.

Logan also made many important discoveries in the early days of the Survey. For example, he identified several broad geological divisions: folded rocks covering Quebec's Gaspé Peninsula and Eastern Townships; the nearly flat-lying limestones that extend west from Montreal to Lake Huron; and much older crystalline rocks extending north an unknown distance from Kingston, Ottawa, and Montreal. The latter soon proved to be the southernmost exposed section of Canada's mineral-rich Precambrian Shield.

After failing to find any extensive coal deposits in the Province of Canada, Logan became interested in the bitumen deposits in Enniskillen Township as a potential substitute. In the Report of the Geological Survey for 1849–1850, Thomas Sterry Hunt analyzed a one hundred pound sample of bitumen that was sent to Logan, noting that the material could be used to create asphalt, caulking material for ships or lamp fuel. The Survey's reports caught the attention of Charles and Henry Tripp, who established the International Mining and Manufacturing Company in 1854, the world's first petroleum company.

In addition to Logan's skills at geological observation and surviving in the wilds, he was an adept manager; during the 1850s he built up the staff of the GSC, adding a paleontologist, a chemist, more geologists, and a museum technician, amongst others. He also lobbied the government successfully for continued funding for the GSC, although he would use his own funds when necessary; he was an independently wealthy man, and to the despair of many parents hoping to snag him as a son-in-law, his response was always that he was "married to the rocks." By the late 1850s, Logan had built the GSC into a well-rounded organization capable of conducting rigorous exploration, making maps, analyzing and identifying mineral and fossil specimens, producing reports, and maintaining a public museum.

The 1850s saw the beginning of the great international expositions, and Logan was a talented promoter of Canada's mineral resources abroad, starting with the Exhibition of the Industry of All Nations, the 1851 world fair at the Crystal Palace in London, England. A second similar opportunity came in 1855 with the Universal Exposition in Paris. Canada's participation in these high-profile events stimulated international interest in Canadian minerals and brought personal honours to Logan. Logan exhibited Charles and Henry's asphalt, where it won an honorable mention. He received the French Cross of the Legion of Honour from Napoleon III in 1855, and his greatest honour, his knighthood bestowed by Queen Victoria at Windsor Castle in 1856. That same year he was awarded the Wollaston Medal, the highest award of the Geological Society of London. Throughout his career, Logan was to receive dozens of prestigious awards.

Logan was also an influential museum builder. In 1856, he was authorized by the government to establish a Geological Museum open to the public – which he did at the GSC headquarters in Montreal. This museum was to grow through the years, and both the Canadian Museum of Nature and the Canadian Museum of History trace their roots to it.

One of the most important accomplishments of the GSC under Logan was the publication in 1863 of the Geology of Canada. Representing all the work of the organization up to that date, this 983-page book recorded everything known about Canadian geology. It received national and international acclaim for its content, style, and precision.

In 1864 Logan founded the Geological Survey of Newfoundland, on request of the colonial government and appointed Alexander Murray as the first director.

In 1869, Logan's geological map of Canada was published (the map is actually dated 1866). On a scale of 1 inch to 25 miles, it showed the geology and geography of southeastern Canada as far west as Manitoba and as far north as lakes St. John, Timiskaming, Nipigon, and St. Joseph. In 1864, a smaller scale version of this same map (1 inch to 125 miles) had been printed in atlas form, making it the first comprehensive illustration of the geology of what is now the southern part of Ontario and Quebec.

Logan retired in 1869 at the age of 71. He died at Castle Malgwyn in Wales, the home of his sister, Elizabeth Gower, on 22 June 1875, and is buried in the churchyard of St Llawddog at Cilgerran, Pembrokeshire, Wales.

== Posthumous honours ==
- Mount Logan, Canada's highest mountain, was named in Logan's honour in 1890 by I.C. Russell of the U.S. Geological Survey.
- The rare mineral weloganite, discovered by GSC scientist Ann Sabina at the Francon Quarry in Montreal in 1966 was named in his honour.
- The Geological Association of Canada awards the Logan Medal, established in 1964, annually as its highest honour.
- Maclean's magazine, in July 1998, named Logan 'Canada's Greatest Scientist' in their feature "The 100 Most Important Canadians in History."
- In 2005, the Literary Review of Canada chose Logan's landmark publication Geological Survey of Canada: Report of Progress from its Commencement to 1863 as one of the 100 most important Canadian books. The list was intended to identify the books that had "changed our country's psychic landscape."

== Bibliography ==
- Winder, C. Gordon, LOGAN, Sir WILLIAM EDMOND, Dictionary of Canadian Biography, Vol. X, http://www.biographi.ca/en/bio/logan_william_edmond_10E.html.
- Vodden, Christy, No Stone Unturned: The First 150 Years of the Geological Survey of Canada, Minister of Supply and Services, Ottawa, 1992
- Harrington, Bernard, J., Life of Sir William E. Logan, Dawson Brothers, Montreal, 1883
- Smith, Charles and Dyck, Ian (editors), William E. Logan's 1845 Survey of the Upper Ottawa Valley, Canadian Museum of Civilization, Gatineau, 2007
- Winder, C. Gordon, William Edmond Logan (1798–1875): Knighted Canadian Geologist, Trafford on Demand Publishing, 2004

Professional and academic associations
Preceded by John Charles Fields	President of the Royal Canadian Institute	Succeeded by Sir Daniel Wilson (academic)
