= Alexander Murray (geologist) =

British geologist (1810–1884)

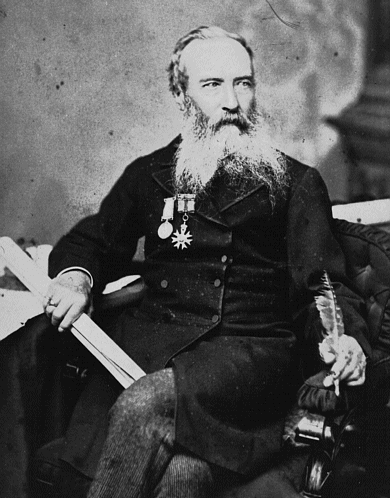
- Born: 2 June 1810; Crieff, Perthshire, Scotland
- Died: 18 December 1884 (aged 74)
- Known for: Geology of Newfoundland
- Scientific career
- Fields: Geology
- Workplaces: Geological Survey of Newfoundland

Alexander Murray, CMG (2 June 1810–18 December 1884) was a British geologist. He is best known for his career with the Geological Survey of Canada and the Geological Survey of Newfoundland. He is credited as the discoverer of the first known Precambrian (Ediacaran) fossil, later named Aspidella.

== Biography ==
=== Early life ===
Alexander Murray was born at Dollerie House, Crieff, Perthshire, on 2 June 1810. He was educated at the Royal Navy Academy and joined the Royal Navy in 1824. During his career in the navy, Murray was wounded at the Battle of Navarino and received a medal for his actions. He became a lieutenant in 1833 and retired from service in 1835. Following his retirement, he emigrated to Woodstock, Upper Canada.

During the Rebellions of 1837–1838, Murray volunteered for service and served in Lieutenant Andrew Drew's naval brigade, which destroyed the US steamer Caroline.

After a period as a farmer, Murray and his family returned to England in 1841, and he applied unsuccessfully for re-appointment to the Royal Navy. During his time in England, Murray studied geology and received an appointment in 1842–1843 to the Geological Survey of Great Britain.

=== Geological Survey of Canada ===
In 1842, the Province of Canada formed the Geological Survey of Canada and appointed William Edmund Logan as its first director. While spending the winter of 1842 in England, Logan made the acquaintance of Murray, and he appointed him as his assistant. Murray returned to Canada in May 1843, and the pair commenced a survey of the colony's natural resources. Murray examined land in the Ontario Peninsula, while Logan surveyed Nova Scotia and New Brunswick.

On 31 May 1851, Murray conducted fieldwork in Enniskillen Township following Thomas Sterry Hunt's analysis of a 100-pound sample of bitumen taken from the region. In his report, Murray confirmed that the region contained various bituminous deposits, noted the presence of oil seeps, and declared the material suitable for the production of lamp fuel, paints, varnishes, and asphalt. Although Murray was cautious in calculating the economic benefits of the gum beds, his work attracted the attention of Charles and Henry Tripp, who acquired a lot in Enniskillen in 1852 and established the world's first incorporated oil company in 1854. In 1858, at an Enniskillen oil seep located by Murray, James Miller Williams established North America's first commercial oil well.

=== Marriage and children ===
Around 1836, Murray married Fanny Judkins in Scotland. Together, they had a son, Anthony Hepburn (born 30 October 1840), and two daughters Mary Ellen (born 2 October 1838) and Helen (born 19 March 1843).

Judkins died in the winter of 1862–1863 in Woodstock while Murray was temporarily residing at the Geological Survey of Canada's headquarters in Montreal.

=== Later life and death ===
In 1864 Murray moved to Newfoundland and became the first director of the Geological Survey of Newfoundland. His first major task was to produce a reliable topographical map of the interior of the island. He did detailed work in the area between Hall's Bay and St. George's Bay, as well as the area surrounding Conception, Placentia, and St. Mary's bays. He also mapped parts of the Great Northern Peninsula and central Newfoundland.

Murray produced the first geological map of Newfoundland, and his reports of rich resources in the island's interior were an important factor in the decision to build the trans-island railway in 1881.

Poor health caused Murray to return to Britain in 1883. On 18 December 1884, Murray died in Belmont Cottage, Crieff.
