= Charles Nelson Tripp =

American businessman (1823–1866)

- Born: Schenectady, New York
- Died: September 30, 1866; New Orleans, Louisiana
- Occupation: bitumen businessmen
- Spouse: Almira Jane Cornish

Charles Nelson Tripp (1823 – 30 September 1866) was an American bitumen businessman in Ontario, Canada. Tripp is best known for his role in the formation of the International Mining and Manufacturing Company in 1854, the world's first incorporated oil company. Tripp and his brother Henry were among the first to exploit Enniskillen Township's bitumen deposits following Thomas Sterry Hunt and Alexander Murray's reports on the region and helped kickstart the first oil boom in Enniskillen Township.

== Biography ==
=== Early life ===
Charles Nelson Tripp and his brother Henry moved to Canada West from Schenectady, New York, sometime before 1850. Tripp went to Bath, Ontario, where he worked as a foreman in a stove foundry. The Tripp brothers learned of the bitumen deposits in Lambton County through a series of Geological Survey of Canada reports by Alexander Murray and Thomas Sterry Hunt and moved to Enniskillen Township in the early 1850s.

=== International Mining and Manufacturing Company ===
After arriving in Enniskillen Township, Tripp amassed 1,450 acres of land and engaged in manufacturing asphalt by boiling bitumen. In 1852, Tripp petitioned the Legislative Council of Canada West for a charter to establish the International Mining and Manufacturing Company. After multiple petitions, the Legislative Council issued a charter on December 18, 1854, resulting in the world's first incorporated oil company. The charter stipulated that the International Mining and Manufacturing Company's goals were to “erect works for the purpose of making oils, paints, burning fluids, varnishes, and other things of the like from their properties in Enniskillen." The company was capitalized at a value of $60,000, with Charles Tripp as President. The Board of Directors included Henry Tripp, Hiram Cook, a wood merchant from Hamilton, John B. VanVoorhies, a wood merchant and contractor from Woodstock and three Americans from New York. Around the same time as the International Mining and Manufacturing Company's incorporation, Tripp sent samples of the bitumen to Thomas Antisell, who described the sample as "a very valuable variety of Bitumen, and applicable to all the purposes for which this substance is now in such demand," and that it was highly suitable for paints, waterproofing materials and an illuminant if distilled.

In 1855, Tripp sent a sample of his asphalt to the University Exhibition in Paris, and it received an honourable mention. The exhibit prompted Paris to order asphalt from Tripp's Company to pave its streets.

Ultimately, Tripp's venture into asphalt manufacturing was not successful. The company had little capital, high transportation costs, and growing debts. From 1855 to 1857, 13 creditors issued judgements against Tripp, and he lost all of his land in Enniskillen with the exception of two 100 acre parcels that he sold for 10 shillings to Henry. One creditor, James Miller Williams, purchased 600 acres of Tripp's land for £2000 and commenced his own oil operation. Tripp briefly worked for Williams in 1856 and unsuccessfully attempted to sink an oil well near Bothwell, before heading to the United States in November. Williams eventually established the first commercially successful oil well in North America when he struck oil in the summer of 1858.

=== Later life ===
After leaving Canada, Tripp travelled to the oil fields in Pennsylvania, before making his way to Louisiana. Throughout the American Civil War, he reportedly explored Louisiana and Texas for minerals under the orders of Edmund Kirby Smith and Henry Watkins Allen. After the end of the Civil War, Tripp learned of the oil discoveries on his forfeited land and returned to Canada to see if he could lay claim to his former property. Tripp travelled to Ottawa in 1866 to petition Parliament and succeeded in getting a small parcel of land back, which he sold for $7000. Tripp then travelled back to New Orleans to pay instalments on his American lands.

=== Marriage and Children ===
In 1855, Tripp married Almria Jane Cornish, daughter of William King Cornish, a prominent London, Ontario doctor, physician and lawyer. Tripp abandoned Cornish when he left for the United States in November 1856, and in 1862 she applied to remove him and Richard Martin as trustees on her Enniskillen properties. Vice-Chancellor Spragge ruled that the Court of Chancery could appoint new trustees, but Cornish could not take full control of her properties. During a public auction of Tripp's land in May 1866, Cornish attempted to secure a 200-acre lot, but she lost the bid after failing to pay the deposit.

=== Death ===
Shortly after arriving in New Orleans, Tripp died in a hotel room on September 30 from "congestion of the brain." His obituary in the Ottawa Citizen noted that Tripp "knew practically, more about the mineral wealth of every Southern State than any other man." Reportedly, at the time of his death, Tripp was organizing companies to mine the minerals he had discovered in Louisiana and Texas.

== Honours, decorations, awards and distinctions ==
In 1997, Tripp and his brother Henry were inducted into the Canadian Petroleum Hall of Fame for discovering the bitumen deposits in Enniskillen township and establishing North America's first incorporated oil company.

In 2008, Canada Post issued a commemorative postage stamp featuring portraits of Tripp and Williams.
