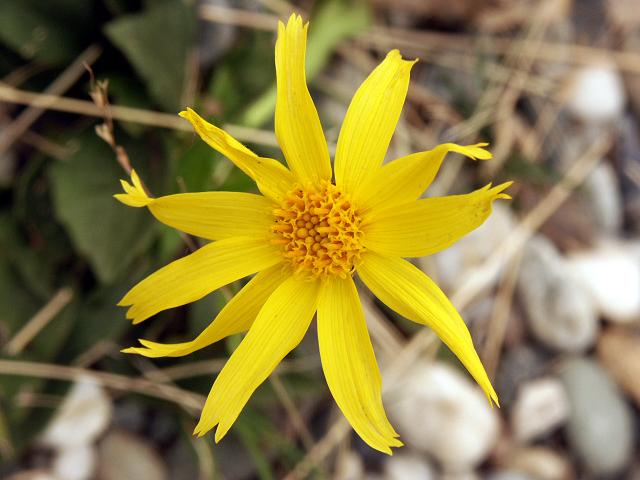

Scientific classification
- Kingdom: Plantae
- Clade: Tracheophytes
- Clade: Angiosperms
- Clade: Eudicots
- Clade: Asterids
- Order: Asterales
- Family: Asteraceae
- Genus: Arnica
- Species: A. griscomii

Binomial name
- Arnica griscomii Fernald

Synonyms
- Synonymy: Arnica frigida subsp. griscomii (Fernald) S.R.Downie; Arnica louiseana subsp. griscomii (Fernald) Maguire; Arnica brevifolia Rydb., syn of subsp. frigida; Arnica frigida C.A.Mey. ex Iljin, syn of subsp. frigida; Arnica illiamnae Rydb., syn of subsp. frigida; Arnica mendenhallii Rydb., syn of subsp. frigida; Arnica nutans Rydb., syn of subsp. frigida; Arnica sancti-laurentii Rydb., syn of subsp. frigida; Arnica snyderi Raup, syn of subsp. frigida

= Arnica griscomii =

Species of flowering plant

Arnica griscomii is an Asian and North American species of plants in the sunflower family, known by the common name snow arnica. It is native to eastern Russia and northwestern North America (Alaska, British Columbia, Yukon, Northwest Territories) and to eastern Canada (Quebec and Newfoundland).

Subspecies

- Arnica griscomii subsp. frigida (C.A.Mey. ex Iljin) S.J.Wolf - Alaska, western Canada, eastern Russia
- Arnica griscomii subsp. griscomii - Quebec and Newfoundland
