= Castell Malgwyn =

Country house in Pembrokeshire, Wales

Coordinates: 52.0606°N 4.6069°W

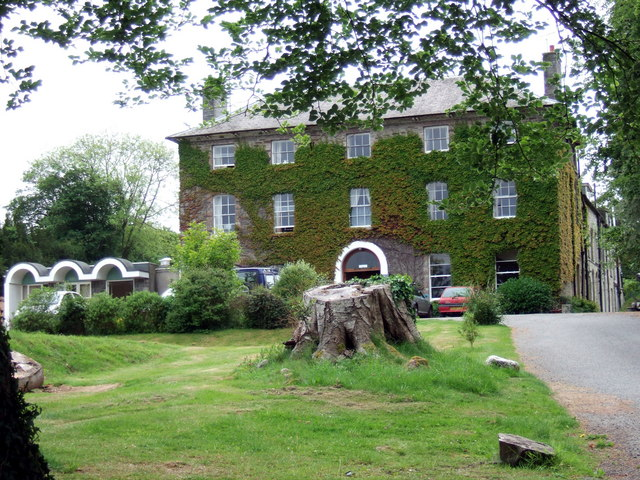
Castell Malgwyn

Castell Malgwyn (alternatively Castle Malgwyn or Hammet House) is a grade II listed Georgian-style country house standing in a landscaped estate in the community of Manordeifi, Pembrokeshire, lying on the south bank of the river Teifi opposite the village of Llechryd. The gardens are listed at Grade II* on the Cadw/ICOMOS Register of Parks and Gardens of Special Historic Interest in Wales. The house is now an upmarket B&B.

== History ==
The present house was constructed c.1795 for Sir Benjamin Hammet, a wealthy entrepreneur from Taunton, Somerset, who bought the estate in 1791. It is built in three storeys of local Cilgerran stone with a hipped slate roof, a five-bay frontage and a two-storey wing. It replaced a previous house and was originally named Castle Malgwyn.

Hammet, who founded and co-owned the bank of Esdaile, Hammet & Co. was elected MP for his home town of Taunton in 1782. He had originally bought the estate to acquire the associated tinplate works at nearby Penygored. He was given permission to close the public road from Llechryd to Cilgerran which ran through the estate and to reroute it further south to skirt the estate. This entailed building the Castell Malgwyn bridge over the "canal", a conduit which fed water to the tinworks, and Hammet Bridge over the Morgenau brook. The grounds were landscaped by local landscaper, Charles Price. They are listed at Grade II* on the Cadw/ICOMOS Register of Parks and Gardens of Special Historic Interest in Wales.

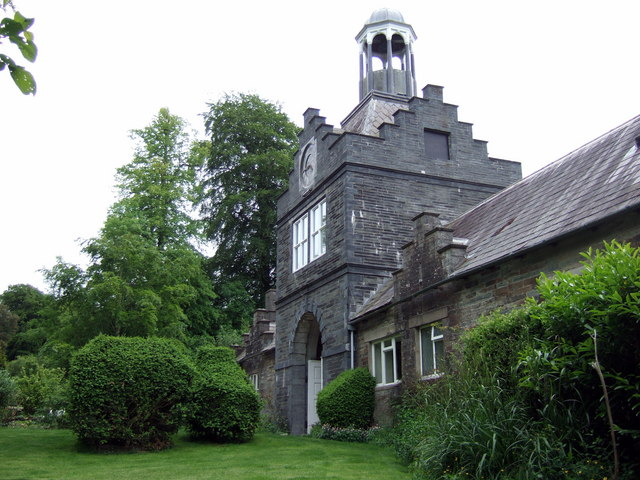
Castle Malgwyn Stable Block

After Hammet's death in 1802 the estate passed to his son, John. By 1806 the works were demolished and on John's early death in 1811 the house contents were sold. When Sir Benjamin's wife Lady Louisa died in 1824 the estate was sold to Abel Anthony Gower of Glandovan, who let the property. On Gower's death in 1837 his nephew, Abel Lewes Gower, inherited and moved in, investing a large amount of money on improving the property, commissioning Ambrose Poynter to build the lodge, grand entrance and stable court. When he also died young in 1849 his widow remained in residence until her own death in 1886, when it passed to Abel Lewes's brother, Robert Frederick Gower, who had also inherited Glandovan from their father. Castell Malgwyn passed down in the Gower family until it was sold in 1948, and became a hotel in 1962.

The house was renamed Hammet House in 2012.
