= Oil Springs, Ontario =

Oil Springs
- Village (lower-tier)
- Village of Oil Springs
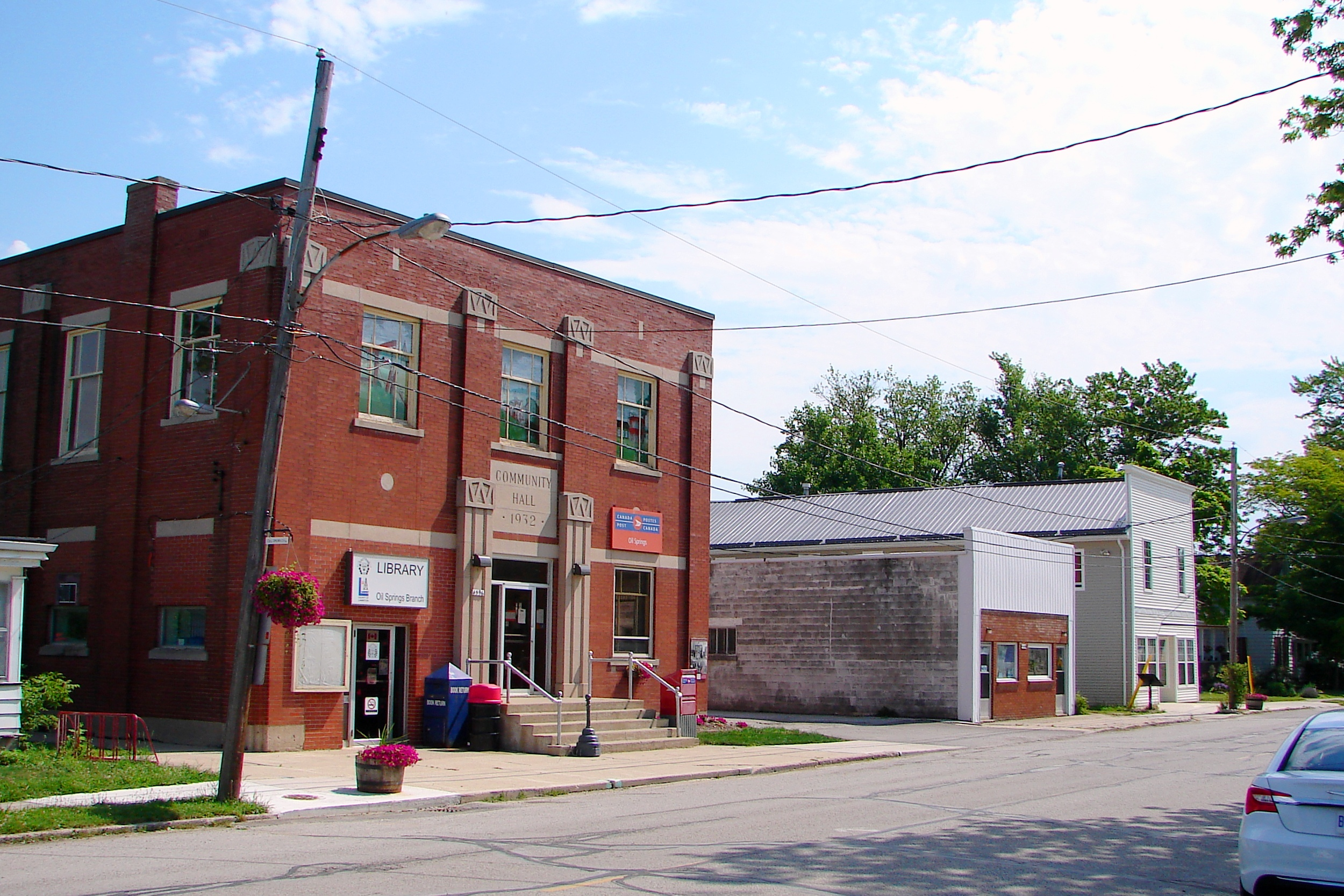
- Nickname: Canada’s Premier Oil Town
- Location within Lambton County Location within Southern Ontario
- Coordinates: 42°47′N 82°07′W
- Country: Canada
- Province: Ontario
- County: Lambton
- Settled: 1850s
- Incorporated: 1865

Government
  - Mayor: Ian Veen
  - Fed. riding: Sarnia—Lambton—Bkejwanong
  - Prov. riding: Sarnia—Lambton

Area
  - Land: 8.14 km^{2} (3.14 sq mi)

Population (2021)
  - Total: 647
  - Density: 79.5/km^{2} (206/sq mi)
- Time zone: UTC-5 (EST)
  - Summer (DST): UTC-4 (EDT)
- Postal Code: N0N 1P0
- Area codes: 519 and 226
- Website: www.oilsprings.ca

Oil Springs is a village in Lambton County, Ontario, Canada, located along Former Provincial Highway 21 south of Oil City. The village, an enclave within Enniskillen Township, is the site of North America's first commercial oil well. It is home to the Oil Museum of Canada.

== History ==
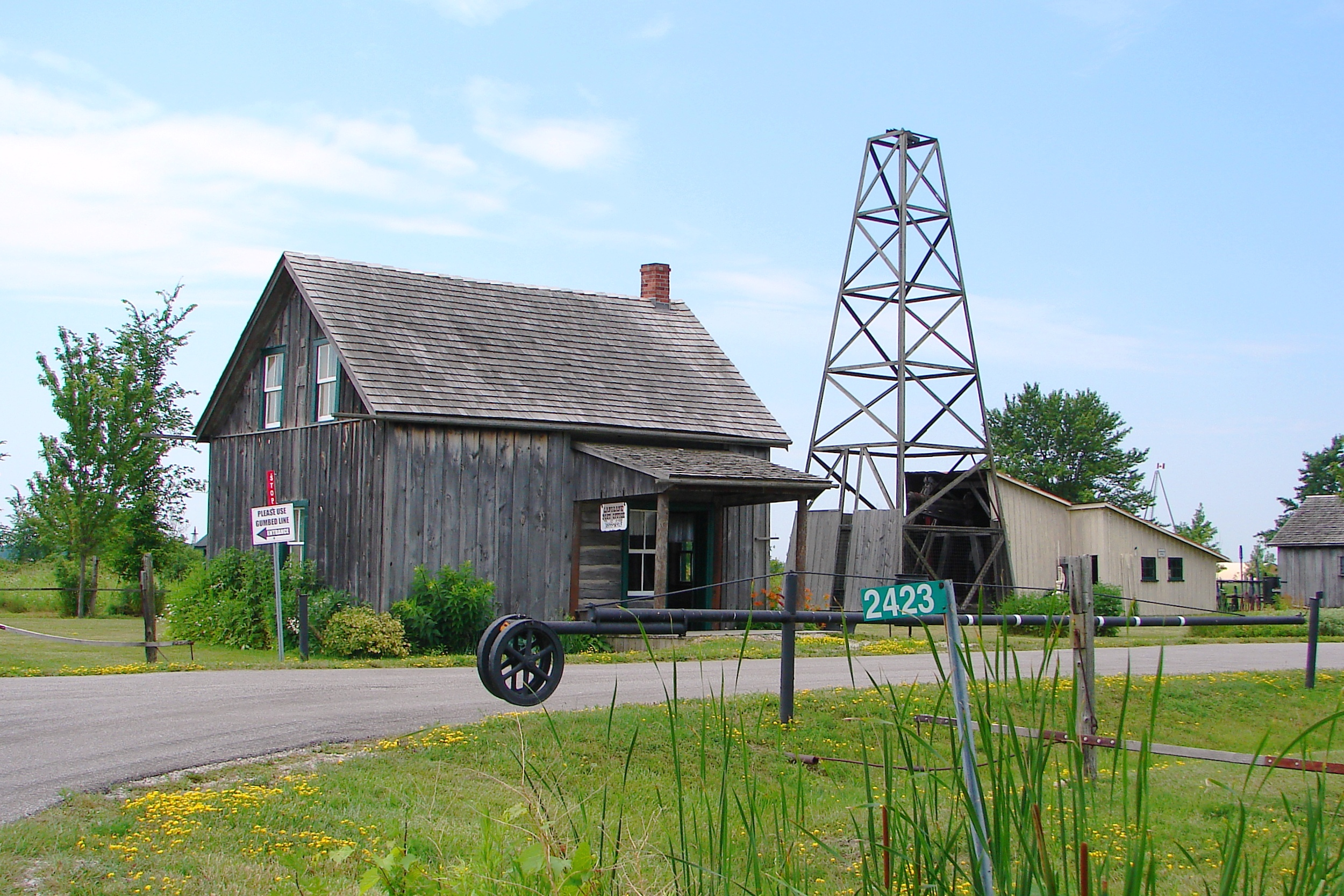
Oil Museum

Before the village was formed, the indigenous people already knew about the gum beds and used the sticky oil to waterproof their canoes. The place, originally called Black Creek, became the site of North America's first commercial oil well when asphalt producer James Miller Williams set out to dig a water well in September 1858 and found free oil instead.

Williams' discovery triggered North America's first oil rush and the village's name was changed to Oil Springs that same year. Within a few years, Oil Springs was a bustling town with four thousand residents and in its peak days boasted paved roads, horse-drawn buses and street lamps.

John Henry Fairbank, a surveyor turned oil man who came to Oil Springs in 1861, bought some property and despite incurring debts and suffering family tragedies, Fairbank struck it rich, founding the successful Fairbank Oil Company that is now the oldest petroleum company in the world. He also invented the jerker line, a method used to pump oil to the surface from multiple wells using a shared steam engine. Jerker lines are still used to pump oil in Oil Springs today.

On January 16, 1862, John Shaw using a springboard to chip through rock, created Canada's first oil gusher (located on Gypsie Flats Road). It shot oil from over 60 metres (200 ft) below ground to above the treetops at a rate of 3000 barrels per day. A year later, a plank road was built from Oil Springs to Wyoming rail station.

In 1865, the place separated from Enniskillen Township and was incorporated as a village. A year later, Bernard King struck oil at Petrolia, 11 kilometres (6.8 mi) north of Oil Springs. Petrolia quickly replaced Oil Springs as Canada's oil capital, leaving Oil Springs almost abandoned.

In 1881, more oil was discovered at a deeper level, resulting in another oil boom for Oil Springs. Two oil pipelines were built to Petrolia, and in 1886, a spur line of the Canada Southern Railway connected the village to Oil City (operating until 1960).

In 1914, Charles Fairbank, son of John Henry, found a gas gusher in Oil Springs that was deemed the biggest gusher in Canada.

In the 1930s, a fire destroyed all of the original oil rigs on William's property and by 1974, the last receiving station of Imperial Oil closed.

In 2008, the 150th anniversary of Williams' discovery, Canada Post issued a stamp commemorating this first commercial oil well, featuring portraits of Charles Tripp and Williams.

In 2014 the Heaven’s Wildlife Rescue Rehabilitation and Education Centre began a tradition of "Oil Springs Ollie" using a rescued groundhog to make Groundhog Day weather predictions in the spirit of Punxsutawney Phil and Wiarton Willie. Two groundhogs have served the role since 2014. Oil Spring Ollie has been scored the most reliable of the weather predicting groundhogs by a 2021 study by Lakehead University climatologists compared 530 predictions by 33 weather-predicting groundhogs to the onset of spring weather. While Groundhog Day predictions average only 50% accuracy, Oil Springs Ollie was right over 75% of the time.

== Demographics ==
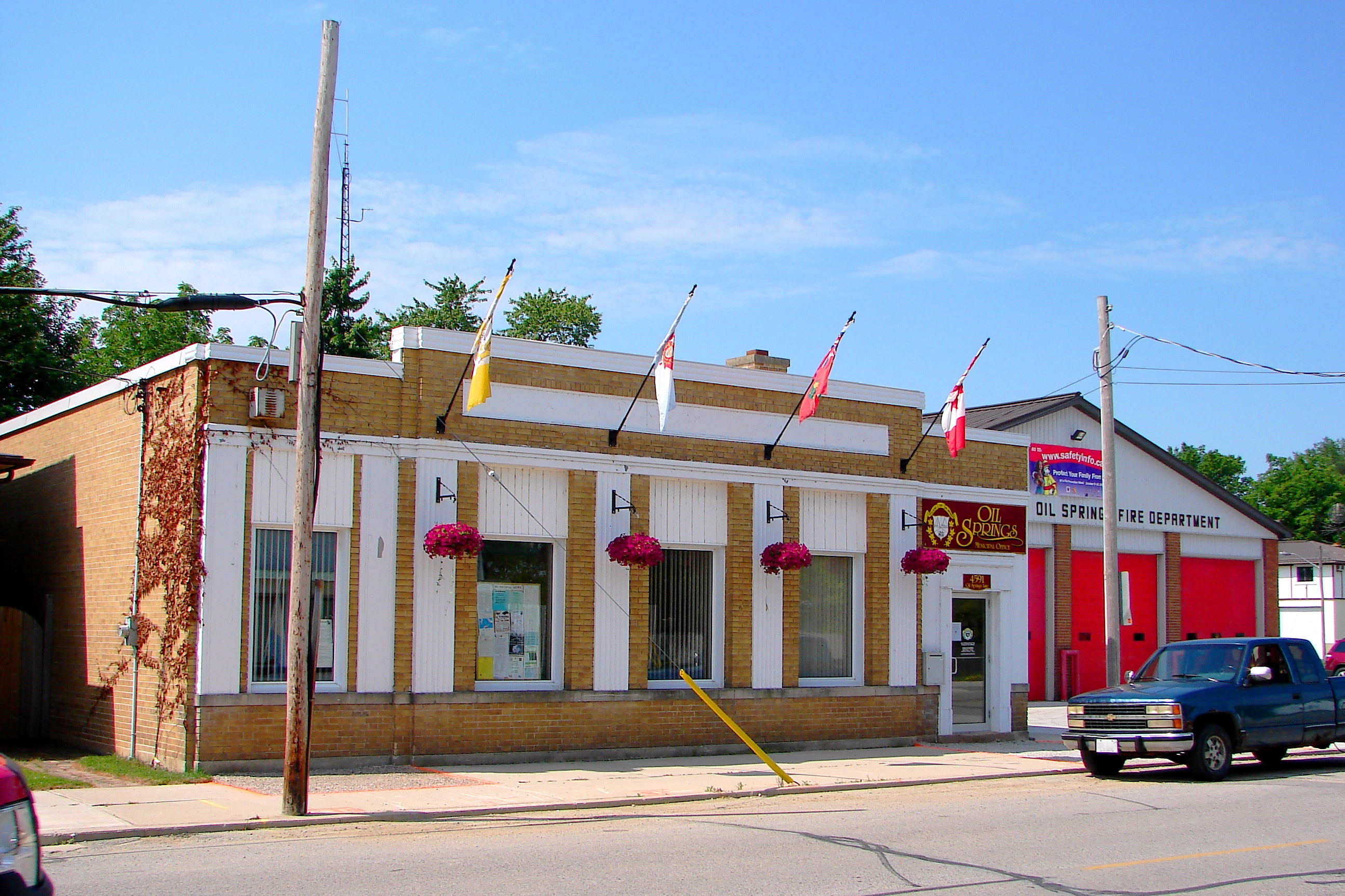
Municipal office

In the 2021 Census of Population conducted by Statistics Canada, Oil Springs had a population of 647 living in 267 of its 283 total private dwellings, a change of −0.2% from its 2016 population of 648. With a land area of 8.14 km^{2} (3.14 sq mi), it had a population density of 79.5/km^{2} (205.9/sq mi) in 2021.

Canada census – Oil Springs community profile

	2021	2016	2011
Population	647 (-0.2% from 2016)	648 (-8.0% from 2011)	704 (-1.8% from 2006)
Land area	8.14 km^{2} (3.14 sq mi)	8.19 km^{2} (3.16 sq mi)	8.18 km^{2} (3.16 sq mi)
Population density	79.5/km^{2} (206/sq mi)	79.1/km^{2} (205/sq mi)	86.1/km^{2} (223/sq mi)
Median age	40.8 (M: 40.8, F: 41.2)	45.6 (M: 43.0, F: 48.1)	41.5 (M: 40.4, F: 43.7)
Private dwellings	283 (total) 267 (occupied)	285 (total)	302 (total)
Median household income	$91,000	$76,288

References: 2021 2016 2011

Historical census populations – Oil Springs, Ontario

Year	Pop.	±%
1871	551	—
1881	552	+0.2%
1891	1,138	+106.2%
1901	1,018	−10.5%
1911	646	−36.5%
1921	490	−24.1%
1931	394	−19.6%
1941	458	+16.2%

Year	Pop.	±%
1951	433	−5.5%
1956	481	+11.1%
1961	484	+0.6%
1966	527	+8.9%
1971	570	+8.2%
1976	618	+8.4%
1981	627	+1.5%
1986	674	+7.5%

Year	Pop.	±%
1991	690	+2.4%
1996	773	+12.0%
2001	758	−1.9%
2006	717	−5.4%
2011	704	−1.8%
2016	648	−8.0%
2021	647	−0.2%

Source: Statistics Canada
