= Thomas Sterry Hunt =

19th-century American geologist and chemist

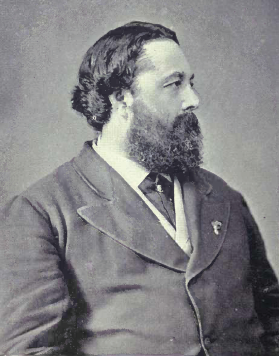
- Born: September 5, 1826; Norwich, Connecticut
- Died: February 12, 1892 (aged 65); New York City
- Occupations: Geologist, chemist

Thomas Sterry Hunt (September 5, 1826 – February 12, 1892) was an American geologist and chemist.

== Biography ==
Hunt was born at Norwich, Connecticut. He lost his father when twelve years old, and had to earn his own livelihood. In the course of two years he found employment in a printing office, in an apothecary shop, in a book store and as a clerk. He became interested in natural science, and especially in chemical and medical studies, and in 1845 he was elected a member of the Association of American Geologists and Naturalists at Yale—a body which four years later became the American Association for the Advancement of Science.

In 1848 he presented a paper in Philadelphia, "On Acid Springs and Gypsum Deposits of the Onondaga Salt Group". At Yale, he became assistant to Benjamin Silliman Jr., and in 1846 was appointed chemist to the Geological Survey of Vermont. In 1847 he was appointed to similar duties on the Geological Survey of Canada in Montreal under Sir William Logan, and this post he held until 1872. Upon arriving in Canada, Hunt began studying the crystalline rocks of eastern Canada, sulphate and phosphate deposits, the composition of mineral waters, and the oil resources in Enniskillen Township. In the Report of the Geological Survey for 1849-1850, Hunt analyzed a one hundred pound sample of bitumen from Enniskillen Township, noting that the mineral could be used to create asphalt, caulking material for ships or illuminating gas. Hunt's report drew attention to the bitumen despots in Southwestern Ontario and helped ignite the first oil boom in Enniskillen Township. In December 1860, Hunt travelled to the Enniskillen oil fields and recorded that James Miller Williams and other entrepreneurs had sunk over 100 oils wells and mined somewhere between 300,000 and 400,000 gallons of oil. He resigned to become professor of geology at Massachusetts Institute of Technology. He was elected an Associate Fellow of the American Academy of Arts and Sciences in 1851.

In 1857, he invented a chromium oxide-based ink while teaching at Université Laval, in response to an appeal for measures to fight counterfeiting. The ink ended up being used on various bank notes, including the US government's Civil War bank notes. This is the origin of the term "Greenback".

In 1859 he was elected fellow of the Royal Society, and he was one of the original members and president of the Royal Society of Canada. In 1861, he was elected as a member of the American Philosophical Society. He was made Chevalier or the Legion of Honor in France and an honorary doctor of laws of the University of Cambridge. He was a frequent contributor to scientific journals, writing on the crystalline limestones, the origin of continents, the chemistry of the primeval earth, on serpentines, etc. He also wrote a notable Essay on the History of the names Cambrian and Silurian (Canadian Naturalist, 1872), in which the claims of Adam Sedgwick, with respect to the grouping of the Cambrian strata, were forcibly advocated. Hunt was elected a member of the National Academy of Sciences in 1873.

Building upon John Tyndall's research on greenhouse gases, Hunt first proposed the theory which linked climate change from the Carboniferous to the modern age to concentrations of carbon dioxide in the atmosphere in an 1863 submission to the American Journal of Science and Arts. He further explored at a meeting for the British Society for the Advancement of Science in the fall of 1878. This was well before Arrhenius established the theory of the greenhouse effect. Hunt later hypothesized that the high concentrations of atmospheric carbon dioxide in the geologic past was of cosmic, rather than volcanic, origin.

He died in New York City on February 12, 1892. The Thomas-Sterry-Hunt International Ecological Reserve, an ecological reserve in Quebec, Canada was established on September 7, 1988.

== Publications ==
His publications include:

- Chemical and Geological Essays (1875, ed. 2, 1879)
- Mineral Physiology and Physiography (1886)
- A New Basis for Chemistry (1887, ed. 3, 1891)
- Systematic Mineralogy (1891)

== Organizations of which he was president ==
- American Association for the Advancement of Science (1870)
- American Institute of Mining Engineers (1876)
- American Chemical Society (1879 and 1888)
- Royal Society of Canada (1884)

== Family ==
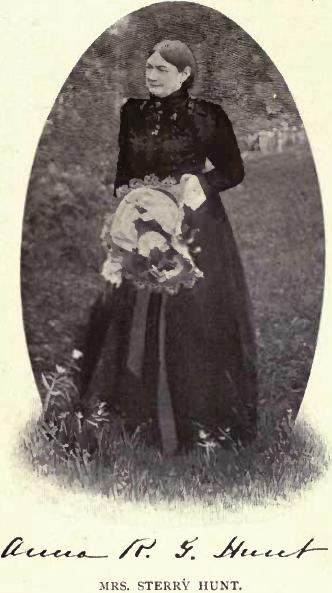
Anna Hunt

In January, 1878, Thomas Sterry Hunt married Anna Rebecca, daughter of Mr. Justice Gale, of Montreal. She was born and educated in Montreal, Quebec. Her early years were spent on a farm adjacent to Montreal. After her father's death, in 1865, she and her two sisters, Baroness von Friesen, and Mrs. Stuart of Quebec, travelled extensively in Europe. The couple moved to Boston, and travelled extensively both before and after her husband's death in February, 1892. Mrs. Hunt was a linguist, and authored volumes of poems.

Professional and academic associations
Preceded by Pierre-Joseph-Olivier Chauveau	President of the Royal Society of Canada; 1884–1885	Succeeded by Daniel Wilson
