= List of United Farmers/Labour MLAs in the Ontario legislature =

The United Farmers of Ontario entered politics by contesting a 1918 by-election which was won by UFO candidate Beniah Bowman. The next year, in the 1919 provincial election in Ontario they achieved a major political upset by winning enough seats to form a government in alliance with Labour MLAs in the Ontario legislature (also listed). The UFO did not have a leader until after the 1919 election when Ernest Charles Drury was asked by the caucus to serve as Premier of Ontario. As he did not have a seat in the legislature he had to enter via a by-election.

== 1874 by-election ==
- Daniel John O'Donoghue, was the first Labour candidate elected to the Ontario legislature. He won an 1874 by-election in Ottawa. Though he supported the Liberals in the legislature he was defeated in the 1875 general election in a three way race against Conservative and Liberal opponents.

== Patrons of Industry (1894) ==
Three candidates were elected under the Patrons of Industry banner in the 1894 general election:

- William Dynes, (Dufferin)
- James Haggerty, (Hastings North)
- David McNicol, (Grey South)

Twelve Liberals and one Conservative were also elected on a joint ticket with the Patrons. The party did not elect any candidates in the 1898 election.

== Rise and fall of UFO and Labour ==
= UFO
= Progressive
= Independent-Progressive
= Labour
= Labour-United Farmers
= Liberal-United Farmers
= Liberal-Progressive

Constituency	MLA	1906	1908	1911	1914	1919	1923	1926	1929	1934	1937
Hamilton East	Allan Studholme										
Hamilton East	George Grant Halcrow										
Manitoulin	Beniah Bowman (Note: elected in 1918 byelection)										
Manitoulin	Thomas Farquhar (Note: defeated in 1929 when he ran for re-election as a Liberal)										
Ontario North	John Widdifield (Note: elected in 1919 byelection)										
Wentworth North	Frank Campbell Biggs										
Middlesex North	James C. Brown										
Middlesex North	Alexander Daniel McLean										
Elgin West	Peter Gow Cameron										
Grey Centre	Dougall Carmichael										
Renfrew South	John Carty										
Dundas	William Casselman										
Kent East	James B. Clark (Note: resigned in 1920 to allow byelection)										
Kent East	Manning Doherty (Note: elected in 1920 byelection)										
Kent East	Christopher Gardiner										
Norfolk South	Joseph Cridland										
Wentworth South	Wilson Crockett										
Sault Ste. Marie	James Bertram Cunningham										
Hastings East	Henry Ketcheson Denyes										
Simcoe South	Edgar James Evans										
Bruce North	William Henry Fenton										
Halton	John Featherstone Ford (Note: resigned in 1920 to allow byelection)										
Halton	Ernest Charles Drury (Note: elected in 1920 byelection)										
Essex South	Milton C. Fox										
Middlesex East	John Freeborn (Note: returned as Liberal for Middlesex North, 1934, 1937)										
Huron Centre	John Govenlock										
Carleton	Robert Henry Grant										
St. Catharines	Frank Howard Greenlaw										
Kenora	Peter Heenan (Note: returned as Liberal, 1934, 1937 (see Liberal-Labour))										
Kenora	Earl Hutchinson (Note: resigned 1934 to accept a government appointment)										
Wellington East	Albert Hellyer (Note: resigned in 1920 to allow byelection)										
Wellington East	William Edgar Raney (Note: elected in 1920 byelection, subsequently elected in Prince Edward in 1926)										
Huron South	Andrew Hicks										
Huron South	William George Medd										
Waterloo South	Karl Homuth (Note: reelected as Conservative in 1929, died 1930)										
Simcoe East	John Benjamin Johnston										
Grey South	George Mansfield Leeson										
Grey South	Farquhar Oliver (Note: returned as Liberal, 1943, 1945, 1948, 1951, 1955, 1959, 1963, joined Liberal cabinet 1941, served as Liberal leader twice)										
Middlesex West	John Giles Lethbridge										
Brantford	Morrison MacBride (Note: returned as Independent 1934, Independent Liberal 1937, died 1938)										
Elgin East	Malcolm MacVicar										
Wellington West	Robert Neil McArthur										
Lanark North	Hiram McCreary										
Peterborough East	Ernest Nicholls McDonald										
Fort William	Harry (Henry) Mills										
Northumberland East	Wesley Montgomery										
Simcoe Centre	Gilbert Hugh Murdoch										
Brant North	Harry Nixon (Note: Liberal 1937, 1943, 1945, 1948, 1951, 1955, 1959, d. 1961. Provincial Secretary (1919–1923), also served in Liberal cabinets (1934–1943) and as Liberal Premier (1943))										
Lambton East	Leslie Oke										
Hamilton West	Walter Rollo (Note: leader of Independent Labour Party)										
Oxford North	David Munroe Ross (Note: elected in 1921 byelection)										
Glengarry	Duncan Alexander Ross										
Victoria South	Frederick George Sandy										
Norfolk North	George David Sewell										
Dufferin	Thomas Kerr Slack										
Perth South	Peter Smith										
Durham East	Samuel Sandford Staples										
London	Hugh Stevenson										
Haldimand	Warren Stringer										
Niagara Falls	Charles Swayze										
Grey North	David James Taylor (Note: died 1934)										
Essex North	Alphonse George Tisdelle										
Peterborough West	Thomas Tooms										
Oxford South	Albert Thomas Walker										
Renfrew North	Ralph Warren										
Victoria North	Edgar Watson										
Lambton West	Jonah Moorehouse Webster										
Lincoln	Robert Kemp										
Bruce South	Malcolm Alex McCallum (Note: d? 1927)										
