= Bothwell (Canadian electoral district) =

Former electoral district in Ontario, Canada

Ontario electoral district

Defunct federal electoral district
- Legislature: House of Commons
- District created: 1867
- District abolished: 1903
- First contested: 1867
- Last contested: 1900

Defunct provincial electoral district
- Legislature: Legislative Assembly of Ontario
- District created: 1867
- District abolished: 1875
- First contested: 1867
- Last contested: 1871
- Region: Lambton & Kent counties Southwestern Ontario

Bothwell was a electoral district and county in the province of Ontario, Canada. It was one of the three new countries in Ontario created by the British North America Act, 1867, upon Canadian Confederation, and consequently one of Ontario's 82 original electoral districts being contested at the concurrently held 1867 dominion election ("federal election" in modern terminology) and 1867 Ontario local election ("Ontario provincial election") shortly after Confederation. The first elections returned Liberal David Mills, later a cabinet minister in the Mackenzie ministry and Laurier ministry and briefly a justice of the Supreme Court of Canada, to the House of Commons and Archibald McKellar, the first Ontario Liberal Party leader, to the Ontario legislature. Coincidentally, one of election contests Mills was a part of would end up in the top court more than a decade before he was to join the court.

Bothwell was represented in the House of Commons of Canada for nine terms from 1867 to 1904, and in the Legislative Assembly of Ontario for only two terms from 1867 to 1875. It is considered one of Ontario's historic counties, as it was among the census districts used from the census of 1871 to the census of 1901 for tabulation of residence of population and economic activities. Despite its brief existence, Bothwell and its predecessor and neighbouring electoral districts had outsized prominence due to the region being the political power base of George Brown, his closest Liberal confidants, and their protégées.

== District ==
The county and electoral district of Bothwell were by-product of the legislation that that created Canada as a nation, the British North America Act, 1867. The act created three new counties for Ontario — Bothwell, Cardwell, and Monck. For Bothwell, the Act prescribes its constituent communities as follows:

The County of BOTHWELL to consist of the Townships of Sombra, Dawn, and Euphemia (taken from the County of Lambton), and the Townships of Zone, Camden with the Gore thereof, Orford, and Howard (taken from the County of Kent)

— British North America Act, 1867, First Schedule - Electoral Districts of Ontario, B. New Electoral Divisions, section 4.iii

The provincial electoral district was only represented in the legislature for two terms, and was abolished in 1874 and redistributed mostly to Kent East and some portion to Lambton East, and Lambton West.

The federal electoral district was represented in the House of Commons for nine terms until 1904. In 1882, the Townships of Euphemia, Orford and Howard were excluded from the riding, and the township of Chatham, the villages of Wallaceburg, Dresden and Thamesville, and the town of Bothwell were added to the riding.

== Electoral History ==
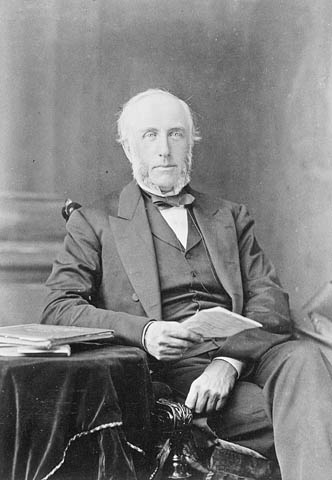
George Brown, founder of the Bothwell community
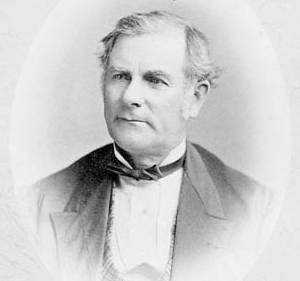
Archibald McKellar, MPP for Bothwell
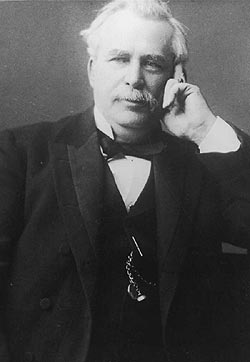
David Mills, MP for Bothwell

=== Reform-Liberal spiritual homeland ===
With territory drawn from Kent and Lambton counties around the time of Canadian Confederation, Bothwell was created at the heart of the political power base of George Brown, the spiritual leader of Clear Grit faction of the pre-confederation Reform Party that became the Liberal Party of Canada and Ontario Liberal Party. Many of the early representatives of Bothwell and its predecessor and nearby districts were key figures in the early Liberal governments both in Ottawa and in Toronto, and some of their strategic decisions and miscalculations unquestionably changed Canadian political trajectory.

The township of Bothwell at the centre of country was founded by Brown, who purchased 4000 acres of land north of the Delaware Nation at Moraviantown in 1851 and had the area surveyed and plotted in anticipation of business opportunities from nearby railway development. Already a known Reform Party influencer and power broker as the publisher of the Globe, he was nominated by the local Reform association to contest the 1851 election against the Reform ministry-sanctioned candidate, and was elected to the 4th Parliament of the Province of Canada in 1851 as the member for Kent.

Rapid population growth in southwestern Ontario led to Lambton county being created out of Kent, and the creation of the corresponding electoral district in 5th Parliament, for which Brown was its inaugural member in 1954. During the final two colonial parliamentary terms prior to confederation, Lambton and Kent, the two electoral district from which Bothwell was created, were represented respectively by Alexander Mackenzie and Archibald McKellar, the two close confidants of George Brown who co-managed the 1851 campaign for his first electoral victory.

=== The 1867 elections ===
In the concurrent 1867 dominion and local elections, there were not yet prohibition law against standing in multiple electoral districts or holding parliamentary and provincial legislature seats simultaneously. In hopes of spreading his three-term incumbent advantage, McKellar stood for re-election for the Commons seat for Kent with former Chatham mayor John Smith joining him on the ticket for the provincial seat while campaigning for the new provincial seat for Bothwell with future federal justice minister David Mills, then a fresh University of Michigan law school graduate not yet called to the bar, standing for the Commons seat. Mackenzie in the other hand contested only the Commons seat for Lambton, won re-election handily and ushered in the future provincial minister Timothy Blair Pardee to the new provincial legislature on his comfortably long coattail. After some hard-fought battles, McKellar delivered both Mills and Smith to their seats, and secured himself a place as MPP for Bothwell, but lost his re-election bid in Kent, a seat he held for three terms.

Their friend and leader George Brown, the founder of Bothwell, fares worse in that election. Bullish about his prospect for the premiership of the new nation having united divergent factions of reform-minded politicians from all four new provinces under his leadership and seeking to settle some old scores, he left his Oxford South turf to contest Ontario South, held by a former moderate Reformer turned loyal lieutenant of Sir John A Macdonald. His defeat there at the nation's first election effectively ended his electoral career. (Note: it was revealed decades later that Sir John A took specific interest in the electoral outcome of Ontario South, and were in some instances personally directing bribes and favours to secure the election of Thomas Gibbs, who would later be a member of his cabinet) The leadership void he left thrusted his two loyal friends to the front line, marshalling the dispirited Liberal survivors in their respective parliaments.

=== Home region to Liberal cabinet members ===
Bothwell and the collections of seats in the region would continue to be featured prominently as the Liberals regained their electoral footing.

Following confederation, the two loyal friends to Brown would collaborate again briefly, as two of the six cabinet members in the first Ontario Liberal ministry formed by Edward Blake in 1871. Bothwell and its successor district Kent East was home riding for McKellar through his ministerial career holding three different portfolios including agriculture, the top economic portfolio at the time, in the Blake and then Mowat ministry. Mackenzie entered the provincial legislature in 1871 representing nearby Middlesex West, gaining back a seat they suffered unexpected duo-defeat in 1867, and served as provincial Treasurer until duo mandate (simultaneously holding provincial and federal seat) was disallowed. Mackenzie's provincial running mate in Lambton Timothy Blair Pardee inherited his ministerial mantle upon his exit and served in the provincial cabinet continuously for sixteen years. The new Premier Blake represented Bruce South also in the region. When Mackenzie's successor at the provincial treasury Adam Crooks suffered local defeat in Toronto, he kept his ministerial career alive through Oxford South, the safe Liberal seat Brown gave up in 1867 to settle old score left by another close associate. When Brown convinced that close associate to give up his judicial perch and return to front line electoral politics to succeed Blake, the new Premier, ever the steady and unstated political operator, would not repeat Brown's mistake, and instead sought his way back to the legislature via Oxford North in this same region.

Alexander Mackenzie retained the predecessor Lambton seat in the House of Commons until it was redistributed in 1882. He shouldered the duty of marshalling a dispirited caucus again after Blake failed to dislodge the conservative government in 1872 and refused to lead the Liberals in opposition. He was unexpectedly given the chance to form government when he Conservative government was brought down by the Pacific Scandal, and led the party to its first electoral victory in 1874. Bothwell MP David Mills would served as his Minister of the Interior, and later as Minister of Justice under Wilfrid Laurier before joining the Supreme Court of Canada in 1902 shortly before his death. Due to the need to balance regional representation, few of the more than 60 Ontario Liberal MPs were included in the Mackenzie ministry. When Mills entered cabinet, there were only three other Ontario MPs in it — former leader Edward Blake, finance minister Richard John Cartwright, and the Prime Minister himself.

=== Supreme electoral dispute ===
Bothwell was the source of one of the rare election cases litigated all the way to the Supreme Court of Canada, coincidently the final ruling declared victory for future justice of the court David Mills. In the 1882 election, the local returning officer initially declared Conservative candidate John Joseph Hawkins elected by a 16-vote margin over the four term incumbent Mills, and Hawkins took his seat in parliament while Mills awaited appeal. In January 1884, a full 18 months after the election, Justice Thomas Galt of the Court of Common Pleas (Note: later Chief Justice Sir Thomas Galt of the same court, the court was later integrated into the Supreme Court of Ontario) rendered the court's ruling that the returning officer acted unlawfully in excluding one poll's tally over errors made by the deputy returning officer in good faith that did not affect the results and in declaring Hawkins elected despite a county court judge having re-tallied the results and certified that Mills having received more votes. The poll in questions had 44 votes for Hawkins and 72 for Mills, its inclusion reversed a 16-vote deficit to a 12-vote advantage for Mills. The court further declared that Hawkins was not duly elected, and awarded the election to Mills. Hawkins appealed to the country's top court, which heard the case in February and issued its judgement on February 25, 1884 sustaining Justice Galt's judgement that the tally of the poll should be included. Its ruling did not declared the whole election void or ordered fresh election. To the contrary, it specifcially stressed the principle that minor mistakes or non-compliances would not affect the validity of the election. The top court confirmed the lower court's decision to include the tally of the one poll in the results and its declaration that Mills having been duly elected and not Hawkins.

== Members of Parliament and Provincial Parliament ==
Bothwell - House of Commons
Parliament	Years	Member	Party
Created from parts of Lambton and Kent
1st	1867–1872	David Mills	Liberal
2nd	1872–1874	David Mills	Liberal
3rd	1874–1876	David Mills	Liberal
3rd	1876–1878	David Mills	Liberal
4th	1878–1882	David Mills	Liberal
5th	1882–1884	~~John Joseph Hawkins~~ (Note: Hawkins was declared by court ruling as not having been elected, with Mills declared elected, see section under electoral history)	Liberal–Conservative
5th	1884–1887	David Mills	Liberal
6th	1887–1891	David Mills	Liberal
7th	1891–1896	David Mills	Liberal
8th	1896–1900	James Clancy	Conservative
9th	1900–1904	James Clancy	Conservative
Dissolved into Kent East, Kent West, Simcoe East and Simcoe South

Bothwell - Legislative Assembly of Ontario
Assembly	Years	Member	Party
Created from parts of Lambton and Kent
1st	1867–1871	Archibald McKellar	Liberal
2nd	1871–1875	Archibald McKellar	Liberal
Dissolved into Kent East, Lambton East, and Lambton West

== Canadian election results ==
1867 Canadian federal election
Party	Candidate	Votes
Liberal	David Mills	1,333
Conservative	David Glass	1,224
Source: Canadian Elections Database

1872 Canadian federal election
Party	Candidate	Votes
Liberal	David Mills	1,727
Unknown	C. R. Atkinson	1,135

1874 Canadian federal election
Party	Candidate	Votes
Liberal	David Mills	1,600
Unknown	? Dobbyn	1,137

Canadian federal by-election, 15 November 1876 Ministerial election, on Mills being appointed Minister of the Interior and Superintendent General of Indian Affairs, 24 October 1876
Party	Candidate	Votes
Liberal	David Mills	1,650
Unknown	James Dawson	1,142

1878 Canadian federal election
Party	Candidate	Votes
Liberal	David Mills	1,852
Liberal–Conservative	John Joseph Hawkins	1,567
Source: Canadian Elections Database

1882 Canadian federal election Initial return ruled unlawful, 12 Jan. 1884, results revised, Mills declared elected instead of Hawkins; ruling sustained by Supreme Court of Canada 25 Feb. 1884.
Party	Candidate	Votes
Liberal–Conservative	John Joseph Hawkins	~~1,520~~ 1,564
Liberal	David Mills	~~1,504~~ 1,576
SCC Ruling: Hawkins v. Smith (Bothwell Election Case), 1884 CanLII 53, 8 SCR 676 (25 February 1884), Supreme Court (Canada)

The returning officer, having excluded the results of one polling division on the grounds of errors committed by the deputy returning officer, initially declared Conservative candidate John Joseph Hawkins was initially declared as elected and returned the writ of election with Hawkins' name. The poll being excluded had 72 votes for Mills and 44 for Hawkins. Justice Thomas Galt of the Court of Common Pleasupon appeal ruled that actions of the returning officer, in both excluding the tally of the one poll and in declaring Hawkins elected, to be unlawful. The ruling included the tally of the one poll in the final results, and based on the result,s, declared Mills instead of Hawkins elected. Upon appeal by Hawkins, the Supreme Court of Canada on February 25, 1884 ruled to sustain the judgement of the Court of Common Pleas. See #Supreme electoral dispute above

1887 Canadian federal election
Party	Candidate	Votes
Liberal	David Mills	2,182
Conservative	Geo. M. D. Mitchell	2,161

1891 Canadian federal election
Party	Candidate	Votes
Liberal	David Mills	2,006
Conservative	G. R. Langford	1,456
Unknown	A. McLartey	1,088

1896 Canadian federal election
Party	Candidate	Votes
Conservative	James Clancy	2,587
Liberal	David Mills	2,528

1900 Canadian federal election
Party	Candidate	Votes
Conservative	James Clancy	2,547
Liberal	David A. Gordon	2,430

== Ontario election results ==
=== 1867 ===
1867 Ontario general election: Bothwell
Party	Candidate	Votes	%
Liberal	Archibald McKellar	1,242	51.45
Conservative	Mr. Kirby	1,172	48.55
Total valid votes		2,414	83.16
Eligible voters		2,903	
Liberal pickup new district.			
Source: Elections Ontario

=== 1871 ===
1871 Ontario general election: Bothwell
Party	Candidate	Votes	%	±%
Liberal	Archibald McKellar	1,304	55.02	+3.57
Conservative	Mr. Kerby	1,066	44.98	−3.57
Turnout		2,370	72.17	−10.99
Eligible voters		3,284		
Liberal hold		Swing		+3.57
Source: Elections Ontario

=== 1872 by-election ===
Ontario provincial by-election, January 1872: Bothwell Ministerial by-election
Party	Candidate	Votes
Liberal	Archibald McKellar	Acclaimed
Source: History of the Electoral Districts, Legislatures and Ministries of the Province of Ontario

== See also ==
- List of Canadian electoral districts
- Historical federal electoral districts of Canada
