= St. Clair Gordon =

Canadian politician

Ontario MPP
- In office 1934–1945
- Preceded by: Archibald Clement Calder
- Succeeded by: George Parry
- Constituency: Kent West

Personal details
- Born: June 3, 1894 Wallaceburg, Ontario, Canada
- Died: June 29, 1953 (aged 59) Wallaceburg, Ontario, Canada
- Party: Liberal
- Spouse: Gretta Hay
- Children: 1
- Occupation: Businessman
- Portfolio: Minister without portfolio, 1937-1943

Arthur St. Clair Gordon (June 3, 1894 – June 29, 1953) was a politician in Ontario, Canada. He served as a Liberal member of the Legislative Assembly of Ontario from 1934 to 1945. He served in the cabinet of Mitchell Hepburn.

== Background ==
He was born in Wallaceburg, the son of D. A. Gordon, and was educated there and at Ridley College. Gordon was president of the National Pressure Cooker Co., the Schultz Die Casting Co., the Sydenham Trading Co. and the Gordon Manufacturing Co. He died in Wallaceburg in 1953; at the time of his death he had a heart condition that caused his health to decline for the last two years of his life.

== Politics ==
He was elected as a town councillor in 1924 and serving as mayor from 1927 to 1928.

In the 1934 provincial election, he ran as the Liberal candidate in the riding of Kent West.

On October 12, 1937, he was appointed as a Minister without portfolio by Premier Mitchell Hepburn. Hepburn wanted Gordon to take on an active portfolio but Gordon declined citing increasing pressures in his own business.

In March 1943, he was appointed Treasurer by Gordon Conant to replace the retiring Mitchell Hepburn. Conant was soon replaced as Premier by the new Liberal leader, Harry Nixon, who retained Gordon as Treasurer in his short lived government which was defeated in the 1943 provincial election. Gordon then served on the opposition bench until he left politics at the 1945 election.

=== Cabinet posts ===
Nixon ministry, Province of Ontario (1943)
Cabinet post (1)
Predecessor	Office	Successor
Mitchell Hepburn	Treasurer of Ontario; 1943 (March–August)	Leslie Frost
