= McCraney =

McCraney is a surname. Notable people with the surname include:

- Daniel McCraney (1834–1885), Canadian politician and lawyer
- George Ewan McCraney (1868–1921), Canadian politician and lawyer
- Tarell Alvin McCraney (born 1980), American playwright and actor
- William McCraney (1831–1911), Canadian businessman and politician

== See also ==
- Rural Municipality of McCraney No. 282, Saskatchewan, Canada
