= Kent West (provincial electoral district) =

Ontario electoral district

Defunct provincial electoral district
- Legislature: Legislative Assembly of Ontario
- District created: 1875
- District abolished: 1967
- First contested: 1875
- Last contested: 1963

Demographics
- Census division: Kent County
- Census subdivision(s): Blenheim, Chatham, Dover, Harwich, Raleigh, Romney, Tilbury, Tilbury East

Kent West was an electoral riding in Ontario, Canada. It was created in 1875 when the riding of Bothwell was split into the ridings of Kent East and Kent West. It was abolished in 1966 before the 1967 election when the ridings of Kent East and Kent West were merged to form the riding of Kent.

== Members of Provincial Parliament ==
Kent West
Assembly	Years	Member	Party
3rd	1875–1879	Alexander Coutts	Conservative
4th	1879–1883	Edward Robinson	Liberal
5th	1883–1886	James Clancy	Conservative
6th	1886–1890	James Clancy	Conservative
7th	1890–1894	James Clancy	Conservative
8th	1894–1898	Thomas Letson Pardo	Liberal
9th	1898–1902	Thomas Letson Pardo	Liberal
10th	1902–1904	Thomas Letson Pardo	Liberal
11th	1905–1908	Archibald McCoig	Liberal
12th	1908–1911	George William Sulman	Conservative
13th	1911–1914	George William Sulman	Conservative
14th	1914–1919	George William Sulman	Conservative
15th	1919–1923	Robert Livingstone Brackin	Liberal
16th	1923–1926	Robert Livingstone Brackin	Liberal
17th	1926–1929	Archibald Clement Calder	Conservative
18th	1929–1934	Archibald Clement Calder	Conservative
19th	1934–1937	Arthur St. Clair Gordon	Liberal
20th	1937–1943	Arthur St. Clair Gordon	Liberal
21st	1943–1945	Arthur St. Clair Gordon	Liberal
22nd	1945–1948	George Parry	Progressive Conservative
23rd	1948–1951	George Parry	Progressive Conservative
24th	1951–1955	George Parry	Progressive Conservative
25th	1955–1959	George Parry	Progressive Conservative
26th	1959–1963	George Parry	Progressive Conservative
27th	1963–1967	Darcy McKeough	Progressive Conservative
Sourced from the Ontario Legislative Assembly
Merged into Kent before the 1967 election

== Election results ==
1963 Ontario general election
Party	Candidate	Votes	%	±%
Progressive Conservative	Darcy McKeough	12,205	53.69	+2.54
Liberal	Garnet R. Newkirk	10,529	46.31	–2.54
Total valid votes		22,734	99.12	
Total rejected ballots		202	0.88	–0.07
Turnout		22,936	64.99	+9.04
Eligible voters		35,290		
Progressive Conservative hold		Swing		+2.54
Source: Elections Ontario

1959 Ontario general election
Party	Candidate	Votes	%	±%
Progressive Conservative	George Parry	9,941	51.15	–3.43
Liberal	Reginald Myers	9,495	48.85	+11.44
Total valid votes		19,436	99.05	
Total rejected ballots		186	0.95	–0.60
Turnout		19,622	55.95	–2.09
Eligible voters		35,070		
Progressive Conservative hold		Swing		–7.44
Source: Elections Ontario

1955 Ontario general election
Party	Candidate	Votes	%	±%
Progressive Conservative	George Parry	10,399	54.58	–0.68
Liberal	William A. Donovan	7,127	37.41	–0.37
Co-operative Commonwealth	Edward N. Savage	1,526	8.01	+1.05
Total valid votes		19,052	98.45	
Total rejected ballots		299	1.55	+0.32
Turnout		19,351	58.04	–10.52
Eligible voters		33,338		
Progressive Conservative hold		Swing		–0.15
Source: Elections Ontario

1951 Ontario general election
Party	Candidate	Votes	%	±%
Progressive Conservative	George Parry	12,194	55.26	+4.51
Liberal	George Frye	8,336	37.78	–11.47
Co-operative Commonwealth	Edward N. Savage	1,536	6.96	–
Total valid votes		22,066	98.77	
Total rejected ballots		274	1.23	–0.00
Turnout		22,340	68.57	+6.19
Eligible voters		32,580		
Progressive Conservative hold		Swing		+7.99
Source: Elections Ontario

1948 Ontario general election
Party	Candidate	Votes	%	±%
Progressive Conservative	George Parry	9,825	50.75	–0.93
Liberal	George Frye	9,534	49.25	+9.92
Total valid votes		19,359	98.77	
Total rejected ballots		241	1.23	+0.03
Turnout		19,600	62.38	–8.29
Eligible voters		31,421		
Progressive Conservative hold		Swing		–5.42
Source: Elections Ontario

1945 Ontario general election
Party	Candidate	Votes	%	±%
Progressive Conservative	George Parry	10,691	51.68	+16.48
Liberal	W. George Kerr	8,136	39.33	–12.67
Co-operative Commonwealth	John C. Morrice	1,861	9.00	–3.81
Total valid votes		20,688	98.80	
Total rejected ballots		252	1.20	+0.10
Turnout		20,940	70.67	+14.81
Eligible voters		29,630		
Progressive Conservative gain from Liberal		Swing		+14.58
Source: Elections Ontario

1943 Ontario general election
Party	Candidate	Votes	%	±%
Liberal	St. Clair Gordon	7,969	52.00	–25.72
Progressive Conservative	Arthur Poulter	5,394	35.20	+12.91
Co-operative Commonwealth	Ross D. Perry	1,963	12.81	–
Total valid votes		15,326	98.90	
Total rejected ballots		171	1.10	–0.46
Turnout		15,497	55.86	+0.70
Eligible voters		27,741		
Liberal hold		Swing		–19.32
Source: Elections Ontario

1937 Ontario general election
Party	Candidate	Votes	%	±%
Liberal	St. Clair Gordon	10,991	77.72	+18.91
Conservative	Arthur W. Sanderson	3,151	22.28	–10.48
Total valid votes		14,142	98.44	
Total rejected ballots		224	1.56	+0.15
Turnout		14,366	55.16	–19.14
Eligible voters		26,044		
Liberal hold		Swing		+14.70
Source: Elections Ontario

1934 Ontario general election
Party	Candidate	Votes	%	±%
Liberal	St. Clair Gordon	11,016	58.81	+9.62
Conservative	Burton L. Bedford	6,137	32.76	–18.05
Independent	Isaac L. Davis	1,580	8.43	–
Total valid votes		18,733	98.59	
Total rejected ballots		267	1.41	+0.78
Turnout		19,000	74.30	+15.58
Eligible voters		25,573		
Liberal gain from Conservative		Swing		+13.83
Source: Elections Ontario

1929 Ontario general election
Party	Candidate	Votes	%	±%
Conservative	Archibald Clement Calder	6,911	50.81	–6.42
Liberal	St. Clair Gordon	6,690	49.19	+6.42
Total valid votes		13,601	99.38	
Total rejected ballots		85	0.62	+0.33
Turnout		13,686	58.71	–5.51
Eligible voters		23,310		
Conservative hold		Swing		–6.42
Source: Elections Ontario

1926 Ontario general election
Party	Candidate	Votes	%	±%
Conservative	Archibald Clement Calder	8,443	57.24	–
Liberal	Charles B. Oliver	6,308	42.76	–17.04
Total valid votes		14,751	99.71	
Total rejected ballots		43	0.29	–1.18
Turnout		14,794	64.22	+16.02
Eligible voters		23,037		
Conservative gain from Liberal		Swing		–
Source: Elections Ontario

1923 Ontario general election
Party	Candidate	Votes	%	±%
Liberal	Robert Livingstone Brackin	6,153	59.80	+11.77
United Farmers	David Livingstone McCreary	4,136	40.20	+9.48
Total valid votes		10,289	98.53	
Total rejected ballots		154	1.47	–1.41
Turnout		10,443	48.20	–33.00
Eligible voters		21,668		
Liberal hold		Swing		+1.15
Source: Elections Ontario

1919 Ontario general election
Party	Candidate	Votes	%	±%
Liberal	Robert Livingstone Brackin	8,098	48.03	–1.86
United Farmers	Elliot W. Hardy	5,179	30.72	–
Conservative	Milton W. Shaw	3,583	21.25	–28.86
Total valid votes		16,860	97.11	
Total rejected ballots		501	2.89	+2.48
Turnout		17,361	81.19	+4.76
Eligible voters		21,383		
Liberal gain from Conservative		Swing		–0.93
Source: Elections Ontario

1914 Ontario general election
Party	Candidate	Votes	%	±%
Conservative	George William Sulman	4,022	50.11	–8.00
Liberal	Robert Livingstone Brackin	4,004	49.89	–
Total valid votes		8,026	99.59	
Total rejected ballots		33	0.41	–0.06
Turnout		8,059	76.43	+20.67
Eligible voters		10,544		
Conservative hold		Swing		–4.00
Source: Elections Ontario

1911 Ontario general election
Party	Candidate	Votes	%	±%
Conservative	George William Sulman	3,106	58.11	+5.14
Independent	Edwin Hea	2,239	41.89	–
Total valid votes		5,345	99.53	
Total rejected ballots		25	0.47	–0.27
Turnout		5,370	55.76	–27.70
Eligible voters		9,630		
Conservative hold		Swing		+2.57
Source: Elections Ontario

1908 Ontario general election
Party	Candidate	Votes	%	±%
Conservative	George William Sulman	3,926	52.98	+4.02
Liberal	Frederick Stone	3,485	47.02	–4.02
Total valid votes		7,411	99.26	
Total rejected ballots		55	0.74	+0.23
Turnout		7,466	83.47	+0.00
Eligible voters		8,945		
Conservative gain from Liberal		Swing		+4.02
Source: Elections Ontario

1905 Ontario general election
Party	Candidate	Votes	%	±%
Liberal	Archibald McCoig	4,073	51.05	–0.59
Conservative	James Clancy	3,906	48.95	+0.59
Total valid votes		7,979	99.49	
Total rejected ballots		41	0.51	–0.19
Turnout		8,020	83.46	+6.98
Eligible voters		9,609		
Liberal hold		Swing		–0.59
Source: Elections Ontario

1902 Ontario general election
Party	Candidate	Votes	%	±%
Liberal	Thomas Letson Pardo	3,714	51.63	–0.36
Conservative	J. S. Fraser	3,479	48.37	+0.36
Total valid votes		7,193	99.30	
Total rejected ballots		51	0.70	+0.03
Turnout		7,244	76.49	–2.15
Eligible voters		9,471		
Liberal hold		Swing		–0.36
Source: Elections Ontario

1898 Ontario general election
Party	Candidate	Votes	%	±%
Liberal	Thomas Letson Pardo	3,689	51.99	–2.53
Conservative	W. R. Hall	3,406	48.01	+2.53
Total valid votes		7,095	99.33	
Total rejected ballots		48	0.67	–0.06
Turnout		7,143	78.63	+7.04
Eligible voters		9,084		
Liberal hold		Swing		–2.53
Source: Elections Ontario

1894 Ontario general election
Party	Candidate	Votes	%	±%
Liberal-Patrons of Industry	Thomas Letson Pardo	3,106	54.52	–
Conservative	James Clancy	2,591	45.48	–4.89
Total valid votes		5,697	99.27	
Total rejected ballots		42	0.73	+0.20
Turnout		5,739	71.59	+6.25
Eligible voters		8,016		
Liberal-Patrons of Industry gain from Conservative		Swing		+2.44
Source: Elections Ontario

1890 Ontario general election
Party	Candidate	Votes	%	±%
Conservative	James Clancy	2,823	50.37	+0.20
Liberal	Mr. Fleming	2,782	49.63	–0.20
Total valid votes		5,605	99.47	
Total rejected ballots		30	0.53	–0.52
Turnout		5,635	65.34	+8.31
Eligible voters		8,624		
Conservative hold		Swing		+0.20
Source: Elections Ontario

1886 Ontario general election
Party	Candidate	Votes	%	±%
Conservative	James Clancy	2,208	50.17	–4.95
Liberal	J. Dillon	2,193	49.83	+4.95
Total valid votes		4,401	98.94	
Total rejected ballots		47	1.06	–0.17
Turnout		4,448	57.03	–1.06
Eligible voters		7,799		
Conservative hold		Swing		–4.95
Source: Elections Ontario

1883 Ontario general election
Party	Candidate	Votes	%	±%
Conservative	James Clancy	2,299	55.12	+7.81
Liberal	H. F. Cummings	1,872	44.88	–7.81
Total valid votes		4,171	98.77	
Total rejected ballots		52	1.23	+1.23
Turnout		4,223	58.10	+11.22
Eligible voters		7,269		
Conservative gain from Liberal		Swing		+7.81
Source: Elections Ontario

1879 Ontario general election
Party	Candidate	Votes	%	±%
Liberal	Edward Robinson	1,343	52.69	+5.36
Conservative	Alexander Coutts	1,206	47.31	−5.36
Total valid votes		2,549	46.87	−11.77
Eligible voters		5,438		
Liberal gain from Conservative		Swing		+5.36
Source:+link Elections Ontario

1875 Ontario general election
Party	Candidate	Votes	%
Conservative	Alexander Coutts	1,440	52.67
Liberal	S. White	1,294	47.33
Turnout		2,734	58.64
Eligible voters		4,662	
Conservative pickup new district.			
Source: Elections Ontario
