= James McGuigan (disambiguation) =

James McGuigan may refer to:

- James McGuigan (1894-1974), Archbishop of Toronto
- Jim McGuigan (1923-1998), Canadian politician
- Jimmy McGuigan (1924-1988), Scottish footballer
