= George William Sulman =

Canadian politician

Ontario MPP
- In office 1908–1919
- Preceded by: Archibald McCoig
- Succeeded by: Robert Livingstone Brackin
- Constituency: Kent West

Personal details
- Born: July 4, 1866 Burford, Kent County, Canada West
- Died: August 10, 1938 (aged 72) Chatham, Ontario
- Party: Conservative
- Spouse: Mary Agnes Meekison (m. 1889)
- Occupation: Businessman

George William Sulman (July 4, 1866 – August 10, 1938) was an Ontario merchant and political figure. He represented Kent West in the Legislative Assembly of Ontario from 1908 to 1919 as a Conservative member.

He was born in Burford, Kent County, Canada West, the son of William Sulman who came to Canada from England. He was educated in Burford and in Brantford. Sulman worked for various companies before establishing a wallpaper, stationery and book store in Chatham. He also owned the Great Western Silverware Company. In 1889, he married Mary Agnes Meekison. Sulman was mayor of Chatham in 1901 and 1902. He also served as a master for the local Masonic lodge. He died after a short illness at his home in Chatham in 1938.

== Travels ==
Sulman and his wife traveled extensively and many of the items that they collected in their travels, including a mummy regarded today as the Sulman Mummy purchased in Cairo, Egypt were donated to the local museum.
