= Kent (Ontario provincial electoral district) =

Former provincial electoral district in Ontario, Canada

Ontario electoral district

Defunct provincial electoral district
- Legislature: Legislative Assembly of Ontario
- District created: 1867
- District abolished: 1986
- First contested: 1867
- Last contested: 1985

Kent was a provincial electoral district in Ontario, Canada. It was created in 1867 at the time of confederation. It was abolished in 1875 when it was split into Kent East and Kent West ridings. It was re-established in 1967 and then redistributed into Kent—Elgin in 1975. It was finally abolished in 1987 when it was merged into Essex—Kent.

== Members of Provincial Parliament ==
Kent
Assembly	Years	Member	Party
1st	1867–1871	John Smith	Liberal
2nd	1871–1874	James Dawson	Liberal
Riding split into Kent East and Kent West ridings in 1875
Riding re-established in 1967
28th	1967–1971	Jack Spence	Liberal
29th	1971–1975	Jack Spence	Liberal
Kent-Elgin
30th	1975–1977	Jack Spence	Liberal
31st	1977–1981	Jim McGuigan	Liberal
32nd	1981–1985	Jim McGuigan	Liberal
33rd	1985–1987	Jim McGuigan	Liberal
Sourced from the Ontario Legislative Assembly
Merged into Essex—Kent before the 1987 election

== Election results ==
=== Kent—Elgin (1975–1987) ===
1985 Ontario general election: Kent—Elgin
Party	Candidate	Votes	%	±%
Liberal	Jim McGuigan	11,616	54.36	+7.28
Progressive Conservative	Shirley McHardy	7,838	36.68	–8.84
New Democratic	Donald Wayne Alexander	1,916	8.97	+1.56
Total valid votes		21,370	99.47	
Total rejected ballots		114	0.53	+0.24
Turnout		21,484	62.71	–1.63
Eligible voters		34,260		
Liberal hold		Swing		+8.06
Source: Elections Ontario

1981 Ontario general election: Kent—Elgin
Party	Candidate	Votes	%	±%
Liberal	Jim McGuigan	10,115	47.08	+1.36
Progressive Conservative	Wes Thompson	9,778	45.51	+2.71
New Democratic	Ed Cutler	1,591	7.41	–4.08
Total valid votes		21,484	99.71	
Total rejected ballots		62	0.29	–0.12
Turnout		21,546	64.34	–2.45
Eligible voters		33,487		
Liberal hold		Swing		–0.68
Source: Elections Ontario

1977 Ontario general election: Kent—Elgin
Party	Candidate	Votes	%	±%
Liberal	Jim McGuigan	10,038	45.72	–10.85
Progressive Conservative	Don Luckham	9,397	42.80	+9.37
New Democratic	Ed Cutler	2,521	11.48	+1.48
Total valid votes		21,956	99.60	
Total rejected ballots		89	0.40	+0.09
Turnout		22,045	66.79	–3.44
Eligible voters		33,007		
Liberal hold		Swing		–10.11
Source: Elections Ontario

1975 Ontario general election: Kent—Elgin
Party	Candidate	Votes	%	±%
Liberal	Jack Spence	12,793	56.57	+6.74
Progressive Conservative	Don Luckham	7,561	33.43	–5.08
New Democratic	Ray McGaffey	2,262	10.00	–1.66
Total valid votes		22,616	99.68	
Total rejected ballots		72	0.32	–
Turnout		22,688	70.23	–
Eligible voters		32,306		
Liberal notional hold		Swing		+5.91
Source: Elections Ontario

=== 1967–1975 ===
1971 Ontario general election
Party	Candidate	Votes	%	±%
Liberal	Jack Spence	8,768	49.83	–1.19
Progressive Conservative	Milt Greer	6,776	38.51	–6.44
New Democratic	Ray McGaffey	2,051	11.66	+7.62
Total valid votes		17,595	99.21	
Total rejected ballots		140	0.79	–0.37
Turnout		17,735	80.37	+3.43
Eligible voters		22,068		
Liberal hold		Swing		+2.62
Source: Elections Ontario

1967 Ontario general election
Party	Candidate	Votes	%
Liberal	Jack Spence	7,668	51.02
Progressive Conservative	John Snobelen	6,755	44.95
New Democratic	Ray McGaffey	606	4.03
Total valid votes		15,029	98.84
Total rejected ballots		177	1.16
Turnout		15,206	76.94
Eligible voters		19,764	
Liberal pickup new district.			
Source: Elections Ontario

=== 1867–1874 ===
1871 Ontario general election
Party	Candidate	Votes	%	±%
Liberal	James Dawson	1,382	53.55	+2.41
Conservative	John Smith	1,199	46.45	−2.41
Turnout		2,581	61.15	−16.84
Eligible voters		4,221		
Liberal hold		Swing		+2.41
Source: Elections Ontario

1867 Ontario general election
Party	Candidate	Votes	%
Liberal	John Smith	1,486	51.14
Conservative	Mr. McMichael	1,420	48.86
Total valid votes		2,906	77.99
Eligible voters		3,726	
Liberal pickup new district.			
Source: Elections Ontario

== See also ==
- List of Ontario provincial electoral districts
- Canadian provincial electoral districts
