= Edward Robinson (Canadian politician) =

Canadian politician

Ontario MPP
- In office 1879–1883
- Preceded by: Alexander Coutts
- Succeeded by: James Clancy
- Constituency: Kent West

Personal details
- Born: 1829 County Roscommon, Ireland
- Died: January 3, 1888 (aged 58) Chatham, Ontario
- Party: Liberal
- Spouse: Charlotte Miller (m. 1864)
- Occupation: Lawyer

Edward Robinson (born 1828 - January 3, 1888) was an Ontario lawyer and political figure. He represented Kent West in the Legislative Assembly of Ontario as a Liberal member from 1879 to 1883.

He was born in County Roscommon, Ireland in 1829 and educated at Trinity College in Dublin. He came to Toronto in 1854 as head of the mathematics department of the Toronto Grammar School. Robinson later articled in law, was admitted as an attorney in 1863 and became a partner of Walter McCrea at Chatham. In 1864, he married Charlotte Miller.

== Electoral history ==
1879 Ontario general election: Kent West
Party	Candidate	Votes	%	±%
Liberal	Edward Robinson	1,343	52.69	+5.36
Conservative	Alexander Coutts	1,206	47.31	−5.36
Total valid votes		2,549	46.87	−11.77
Eligible voters		5,438		
Liberal gain from Conservative		Swing		+5.36
Source:+link Elections Ontario
