= Cardwell =

Cardwell may refer to:

== Places ==
=== Australia ===
- Cardwell, Queensland

=== United States ===
- Cardwell, Missouri
- Cardwell, Montana
- Cardwell Hall, Kansas State University

=== Canada ===
- Cardwell Parish, New Brunswick

== People ==
- Alvin B. Cardwell (1902–1992), American physicist
- Dale Cardwell (born 1962), American consumer advocate and journalist
- Don Cardwell (1935–2008), American baseball player
- D. S. L. Cardwell (1919-!998), British historian of science and technology
- Dylan Cardwell (born 2001), American basketball player
- Edward Cardwell (1787–1861), English theologian
- Edward Cardwell, 1st Viscount Cardwell (1813–1886), 19th Century English politician and Secretary of State for War
- Ethan Cardwell (born 2002), Canadian ice hockey player
- John Edwin Cardwell, British missionary in China
- Joi Cardwell (born 1967), musician
- Joshua Cardwell (1910–1982), Northern Ireland politician
- Lloyd Cardwell (1913–1997), American football player
- Louis Cardwell (1912–1986), English footballer
- Paul Cardwell (born 1958), British advertising executive
- Richard H. Cardwell (1845–1931), American lawyer and politician
- Steve Cardwell (born 1950), Canadian ice hockey player
- Vicki Cardwell (born 1955), Australian squash player

== Things ==
- Cardwell Reforms of the British army
- Cardwell (federal electoral district), a former Canadian federal electoral district
