= Thomas Letson Pardo =

Ontario MPP
- In office 1894–1904
- Preceded by: James Clancy
- Succeeded by: Archibald McCoig
- Constituency: Kent West

Personal details
- Born: November 21, 1840 Cedar Springs, Upper Canada
- Died: June 11, 1925 (aged 84)
- Party: Liberal
- Spouse: Ellen Jane Price (m. 1866)
- Occupation: Businessman

Thomas Letson Pardo (November 21, 1840 – June 11, 1925) was an Ontario farmer, manufacturer and political figure. He represented Kent West in the Legislative Assembly of Ontario from 1894 to 1902 as a Liberal-Patrons of Industry and then Liberal member.

He was born at Cedar Springs, Upper Canada, the son of Thomas Pardo. Pardo was in British Columbia from 1862 to 1865, possibly in search of gold. After his return, in 1866, he married Ellen Jane Price. He operated a sawmill in partnership with his brothers, later becoming sole owner, and also manufactured barrel staves and operated gristmills at Blenheim. Pardo served on the council for Harwich Township, also serving as reeve. He was a Freemason and a member of the Ancient Order of United Workmen.
