= Andrew Thomas Ward =

Canadian politician

Member of the Ontario Provincial Parliament for Kent East
- In office November 22, 1951 – May 2, 1955
- Preceded by: Edward B. McMillan
- Succeeded by: Jack Spence

Personal details
- Party: Progressive Conservative

Andrew Thomas Ward was a Canadian politician who was Progressive Conservative MPP for Kent East from 1951 to 1955.

== See also ==
- 24th Parliament of Ontario
