= Robert Livingstone Brackin =

Canadian politician from Ontario

Member of the Ontario Provincial Parliament for Kent West
- In office October 20, 1919 – October 18, 1926
- Preceded by: George William Sulman
- Succeeded by: Archibald Clement Calder

Personal details
- Party: Liberal

Robert Livingstone Brackin was a Canadian politician from Ontario. He represented Kent West in the Legislative Assembly of Ontario from 1919 to 1926.

== See also ==
- 15th Parliament of Ontario
- 16th Parliament of Ontario
