= Christopher Gardiner =

Canadian politician from Ontario

Member of the Ontario Provincial Parliament for Kent East
- In office December 1, 1926 – September 17, 1929
- Preceded by: Manning Doherty
- Succeeded by: Philip James Henry

Personal details
- Party: Progressive

Christopher Gardiner was a Canadian politician who was Progressive MPP for Kent East from 1926 to 1929.

== See also ==
- 17th Parliament of Ontario
- List of United Farmers/Labour MLAs in the Ontario legislature
