= Robert Ferguson (Ontario politician) =

Canadian politician

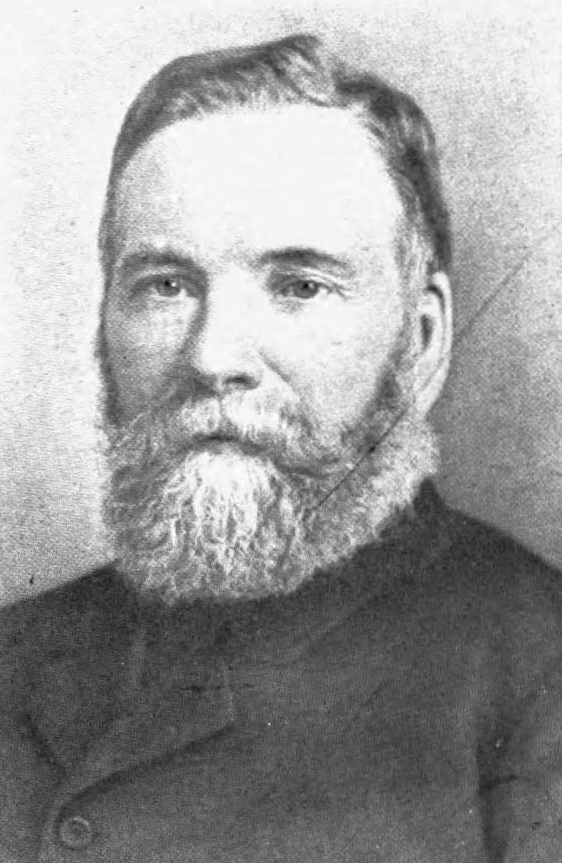

Ontario MPP
- In office 1885–1901
- Preceded by: Daniel McCraney
- Succeeded by: John Lee
- Constituency: Kent East

Personal details
- Born: August 16, 1832 Kilsyth, Stirlingshire, Scotland
- Died: September 7, 1901 (aged 67) Thamesville, Ontario
- Party: Liberal
- Occupation: Businessman

Robert Ferguson (August 16, 1834 – September 7, 1901) was an Ontario merchant and political figure. He represented Kent East in the Legislative Assembly of Ontario from 1885 to 1901 as a Liberal member.

He was born in Kilsyth, Stirlingshire, Scotland in 1834, the son of James Ferguson, and came to Howard Township with his family in 1854. He learned carpentry in Scotland and later became involved in the lumber trade in Ontario. Ferguson served as reeve for Camden Township and warden for Kent County. He was elected in an 1885 by-election held after the death of Daniel McCraney. He died at his home in Thamesville, Ontario in 1901.
