= Edward B. McMillan =

Canadian politician from Ontario

Member of the Ontario Provincial Parliament for Kent East
- In office June 7, 1948 – October 6, 1951
- Preceded by: Wesley Gardiner Thompson
- Succeeded by: Andrew Thomas Ward

Personal details
- Party: Liberal

Edward B. McMillan was a Canadian politician who was Liberal MPP for Kent East from 1948 to 1951.

== See also ==
- 24th Parliament of Ontario
