= Alexander Coutts =

Canadian politician

Ontario MPP
- In office 1875–1879
- Preceded by: New riding
- Succeeded by: Edward Robinson
- Constituency: Kent West

Personal details
- Born: April 17, 1824 Tullich, Aberdeenshire, Scotland
- Died: August 14, 1881 (aged 57) Tilbury, Ontario
- Party: Conservative
- Spouse: Jane McVean (m. 1856)
- Occupation: Farmer

Alexander Coutts (April 17, 1824 – August 14, 1881) was a Scottish-born farmer and politician in Ontario, Canada. He represented Kent West in the Legislative Assembly of Ontario from 1875 to 1879 as a Conservative.

He was born in Tullich, Aberdeenshire, the son of John Coutts and Ann McDonald, and arrived in Canada with his family in 1834. Coutts was educated in Tilbury East. In 1856, he married Jane McVean. Coutts served 18 years on the township council for Tilbury East, serving as reeve for 12 years.

He died in Tilbury East at the age of 57.

== Electoral history ==
1875 Ontario general election: Kent West
Party	Candidate	Votes	%
Conservative	Alexander Coutts	1,440	52.67
Liberal	S. White	1,294	47.33
Turnout		2,734	58.64
Eligible voters		4,662	
Conservative pickup new district.			
Source: Elections Ontario

1879 Ontario general election: Kent West
Party	Candidate	Votes	%	±%
Liberal	Edward Robinson	1,343	52.69	+5.36
Conservative	Alexander Coutts	1,206	47.31	−5.36
Total valid votes		2,549	46.87	−11.77
Eligible voters		5,438		
Liberal gain from Conservative		Swing		+5.36
Source:+link Elections Ontario
