= Creature Comforts =

British media franchise

- Created by: Nick Park
- Original work: Creature Comforts (1989)
- Owner: Aardman Animations
- Years: 1989–2024

Films and television
- Animated series: Creature Comforts (2003-2006); Creature Comforts: In the USA (2007); Things We Love (2024)
- Television special(s): Greetings from Creature Comforts (2007)
- Television short(s): Creature Comforts (1989)

Creature Comforts is a British stop-motion mockumentary franchise originating in a 1989 animated short film of the same name. The film matched animated zoo animals with a soundtrack of people talking about their homes, making it appear as if the animals were being interviewed about their living conditions.

It was created by Nick Park and Aardman Animations. The film became the basis of a series of television advertisements for the electricity boards in the United Kingdom. In 2003, a television series in the same style was released. An American version of the series was also made. A sequel series, Things We Love, first aired on BBC One in 2024.

== The original film ==
The original Creature Comforts short film was conceived and directed by Nick Park and produced by Aardman Animations, featuring the voices of British non-actors in the same vein as the "man on the street" vox pop interviews. It was produced as part of a series called Lip Synch for Channel 4. The film won Nick Park the Academy Award for Best Animated Short Film in 1991.

The film shows various animals in a zoo being interviewed about their living conditions. These include a family of polar bears, Tracey, a depressed female gorilla, a Brazilian lion (often resembled a puma), a maternal brown four-eyed opossum, and a hippopotamus calf who complain about the cold weather, the poor quality of their enclosures and the lack of space and freedom.

By contrast, a tarsier, Alex, a former circus chicken, a tortoise, and an armadillo praise their enclosures for the comfort and security they bring, and a family of polar bears, particularly one named Andrew, talk about both the advantages and disadvantages of zoos for the welfare of animals. Rather than the subject being one-sided or biased towards one viewpoint, there is a strong balance of opinions in the film, with some interviewees who are happy with their living situation, some who are not, and some who have a neutral opinion.

The voices of each character were performed by residents of both a housing estate and an old people's home. Stop motion animation was then used to animate each character, and the answers given in the interviews were put in the context of zoo animals. The polar bears were voiced by a family who owned a local shop, while the lion was voiced by Nick Park's Brazilian friend. The only credited actress was Julie Sedgewick who voiced the interviewer.

== Advertisements ==
In 1990, Nick Park worked with Phil Rylance and Paul Cardwell to develop a series of British television advertisements for the electricity boards' "Heat Electric" campaign. The creative team of advertising agency GGK had seen the original Creature Comforts film and were hugely impressed by it.

They were convinced that a series of short films modeled on the original film would be ideally suited to television advertising – as long as the advertising was handled with sufficient sensitivity to preserve the integrity and charm of Park's work. The initial result of their collaboration was three 30-second Creature Comforts advertisements, made in the same style as the original film. This led to a series.

Although there had been a tradition of vox pop advertisements going back to the soap powder adverts of the 1960s, the Creature Comforts series was distinctive in its juxtaposition of real-life dialogue and animated creatures. The series featured a variety of endearing plasticine animals, including a tortoise, a cat, a family of penguins and a Brazilian parrot. The characters were seen in their own domestic settings, chatting to an unseen interviewer behind a large microphone.

The characters' dialogue was obtained by taking tape recordings of everyday people talking about the comfort and benefits of the electrical appliances in their homes and then using extracts of these – complete with pauses, false starts, repetitions, hesitations and unscripted use of language (such as "easily turn off and on able"). The selected interviewees spoke in a range of down-to-earth regional accents, and the overall effect was of natural conversation. The adverts' warm and cosy tone reflected the warmth and homeliness of central heating.

The characterisation was strengthened by having each voice carefully matched to a suitable animal in a combination that would produce a memorable impact. These features were rounded off by a gentle closing voiceover spoken by Johnny Morris. Morris appealed especially to older audiences, who would remember him and his animal conversations on the television programme Animal Magic.

The campaign was a great success and its run was extended over three years. The advertisements received critical acclaim within the advertising industry – with Park, Rylance and Cardwell picking up many top creative awards in Europe and America, including "Best Commercial of the Year" in the 1991 British Television Advertising Awards and "Most Outstanding European Campaign" in the 1991 D&AD Europe Awards. In fact, Creature Comforts was subsequently voted by media professionals (in leading trade outlets Marketing and Brand Republic) as one of the top television advertisements of the last fifty years.

As well as attaining a very high level of viewer recall, the advertisements were much loved – particularly the ones involving Frank (the tortoise), Carol (the cat) and Pablo (the parrot). In awarding them a place in The 100 best British ads of the century, the United Kingdom's leading advertising journal Campaign commented "The power of a campaign which can make consumers feel warm towards a utility cannot be underestimated".

The many popular awards won by the Creature Comforts advertisements included being voted fourth in the all time 100 Greatest TV Ads by readers of The Sunday Times and viewers of Channel 4 in April 2000. Their position among the classic advertisements of British television was confirmed when Creature Comforts was voted fourth in ITV's Best Ever Adverts by viewers of ITV in 2005. Finally, in a YouGov survey during 2006, Creature Comforts topped the list of the United Kingdom's alltime favourite animated or puppet characters used in adverts.

The Creature Comforts advertisements have now attained a place in popular culture, and are probably better remembered than the original film that spawned them. However, it is claimed that many members of the public mistakenly remember the commercials as advertising gas heating, the main competitor to electricity.

=== Influences ===
The Creature Comforts advertisements were produced in the period 1990 to 1992 and in some ways they were indicative of the shape of things to come in British television advertising. Many commentators believe that there was a fundamental shift in television advertising from the unbridled consumerism and egoism of the 1980s to what is sometimes termed a more "caring" approach in the 1990s. The Creature Comforts advertisements are cited as an early example of this phenomenon.

The format of the Creature Comforts advertisements was so successful that it was replicated in other campaigns in the following decades. In later years, however, members of the public became increasingly conscious of the potential uses of their vox pop interviews. This made it difficult to recapture the spontaneity and innocence of the early Creature Comforts advertisements. Although lookalike animations became relatively commonplace in television advertisements, they were usually scripted and rarely possessed the painstaking attention to detail of the original advertisements.

=== Credits ===
- Director: Nick Park
- Creative Director: Nick Fordham
- Art Directors: Phil Rylance, Newy Brothwell
- Writers: Paul Cardwell, Kim Durdant-Hollamby

== The series ==
In 2003, a series of Creature Comforts films directed by Richard Goleszowski was made for the British television network ITV by Aardman Animations. The series was distributed globally by Granada International who also handled home video rights except in the United Kingdom, United States and Australia, which were retained by Aardman.

The series has since aired as repeats on Comedy Central, usually late at night. Starting in 2005, it has also aired in Australia on ABC, in The Netherlands on Veronica, on pay television channel US TV, and on the Internet, as well as on the Aardman Animations YouTube Channel.

A thirty-minute special in which the regular characters attempt to perform and interpret the Christmas carol "The Twelve Days of Christmas" was first aired on 25 December 2005. The special was broadcast in Canada on the CBC on 26 December 2005.

Humour pervades all aspects of the series, for example:

- A highly philosophical speech given by Brian the amoeba.
- An alligator praising her neighbourhood, the sewer.
- Animals being scared of their own habitat
- Background details such as:
  - Insects swarming into a gap in the paving stones when a slug mimics a bird call.
  - Grey aliens blinking in unison.
  - A lab mouse being interviewed while another mouse with a human ear on his back walks by.

The series gently mocks the constructed performance sometimes given by members of the general public when being interviewed for television vox pops and documentaries. This includes the attempts to present a cogent but simple conclusive answer to a general question, a sound bite, and the attempts to present a cheery spin on a complex issue while the subject attempts to hide their personal issues and problems with the issue.

The series is currently repeated on Gold.

== Regular characters ==
The following characters are among those who make regular appearances throughout the series. These animals are always portrayed by the same interviewees to maintain consistency throughout the series.

=== Introduced in Series 1 ===
- Fluffy – a the cynical hamster who lives in Catford.
- Pickles (voiced by Sarah Williams – an optimistic Labrador Retriever who works as a guide for a blind man. She is often seen sitting by her owner's side, but the man's face is never shown on screen.
- Clement – an elderly bloodhound who talks about his past life experiences.
- Sapphire – an adolescent bottlenose dolphin who lives in an aquarium.
- Trixie and Captain Cuddlepuss – Trixie is a female Vizsla and Captain Cuddlepuss is a male British Shorthair. They sit on a red sofa and frequently argue about trivial things. They are the most recurring regular characters in the series.
- Anthony – a mysophobic pig.
- Chappie – an elderly Camargue horse.
- Sue and Lorraine – two walruses who sit on an iceberg.
- Gary and Nigel – two slugs who mostly talk about plants and gardening. One of them is accompanied by his young daughter in one episode.
- Dave – a laid-back earthworm who lives with his mother.
- The Shark – a blue shark with a fear of water.
- Stan and Ted – two baby birds who live in a nest.
- Sid and Nancy – two rats who live in a garden shed.
- Frank – a tortoise who originally appeared in the Heat Electric television adverts.
- Dennis – a dung beetle who pushes a ball of dung while walking backwards.
- Brian – an amoeba that can be seen through a microscope. Despite being an extremely primitive life form, Brian has a highly philosophical view on life and talks about complex science. Unlike other characters in the series, Brian is a CGI animated character.
- Muzulu and Toto – two Peruvian spider monkeys. In the first series, Muzulu and Toto are shown as circus monkeys sitting in a cage and wearing matching pink and blue outfits, but in the second series they are shown without their outfits and living in a forest with other wild monkeys.
- Megan and Gladys – two herring gulls with a Welsh accent who stand on a landfill site.
- Spanner and Trousers – two stray dogs who sit in a skip.
- The Rudges – a family of sea anemones voiced by the same family as the polar bears in the original Creature Comforts short.

=== Introduced in Series 2 ===
- Victor – a white mouse with a Geordie accent who lives in a doll house.
- Derek – An elderly Shar Pei with a Welsh accent. He sits next to a small Shar Pei puppy who does not speak.
- Brian and Keith – two Bull Terriers who are brothers.
- Muriel and Catherine – a pair of bats who roost in a belfry.
- Behzad – an Arabian horse who has several different jobs, including a police horse, a member of the Queen's Guard at Buckingham Palace, and a faux Christmas reindeer.
- Rocky – a black rooster who speaks before it is ready to crow and wake up the farm.
- Black – a black pig with a yellow RFID tag on her left ear.
- Audrey and Seymour – two Dachshunds.
- Fifi and Apollo – two Poodles.

== Miscellaneous ==
A special short was aired in the United Kingdom as part of Red Nose Day 2007.

== American version ==
Starting in June 2007, CBS planned to broadcast seven episodes of an Americanized version of the show, featuring ordinary American people providing the voices, in the same vein as the British original. The series was titled Creature Comforts and was seen Monday nights at 8PM ET/PT from 4 to 18 June 2007 (only three episodes were broadcast due to low ratings, and was replaced with reruns of The New Adventures of Old Christine); the series was also simulcast in Canada on the CH system. It was the fourth prime-time animated series produced for CBS after Fish Police and Family Dog.

CBS also created a web presence with the help of the Creature Comforts staff. A behind-the-scenes collaborative account/blog of each episode was posted, in conjunction with the three short-lived airings. The American version was co-produced by Aardman Animations and The Gotham Group.

Seven episodes of this series were produced. However, the series ran for only three episodes, before being cancelled by CBS due to low ratings. Its remaining episodes were later premiered on Animal Planet in 2008 (see below). A standard DVD of the show's seven episodes was released on 9 October 2007 by Sony, now entitled Creature Comforts America. Currently, there is no Blu-ray version, even though the show was mastered in 1080 HD with a 16:9 aspect ratio.

On 8 February 2008, the show won an Annie Award for "Best Animated Television Production" of 2007. In Australia, public broadcaster ABC Television began airing the American season in Australia on 18 February 2008, having aired the original British version since its inception on both ABC1 and the digital only ABC2.

On 24 April 2008, Animal Planet picked up the first season of the American version. It was broadcast in both SD letterbox and native HD formats. Episodes 1&2 premiered on 24 April, Episodes 3&4 premiered on 1 May, and Episodes 5&6 premiered on 9 May. Creature Comforts was nominated for an Emmy Award for "Outstanding Animated Program (For Programming Less Than One Hour)" but on 13 September 2008, it lost out to The Simpsons. Teresa Drilling, one of the show's many animators, won an individual Emmy Award for "Outstanding Individual Achievement in Animation".

=== American version staff ===
- Executive Producers: Kit Boss, Miles Bullough, Peter McHugh, David Sproxton, Peter Lord, Nick Park
- Producers: Kenny Micka, Gareth Owen
- Story Editors: Chad Carter, June Raphael, Casey Wilson
- Writers: Kit Boss, Chad Carter, Michael Dougan, Ben Stout, June Raphael, Casey Wilson
- Directors: David Osmand, Merlin Crossingham

== Things We Love ==
In 2024, a series of six 30 second films, Things We Love, was announced by the BBC. Like the original series, audio from interviews with non-actors is synched with stop-motion animation of animals to make it seem as if they are talking about their living conditions. The sequel series is also created and produced by Aardman.

== DVD releases ==
DVD title	Country of release	Region	Date of release	DVD company	Catalog number	Notes
Creature Comforts	United States	1	28 November 2000	Image Entertainment	ID0106CUDVD	The original 1989 film presented in widescreen. Also includes the other Aardman animations Wat's Pig, Not Without My Handbag and Adam
Creature Comforts – Series 1, Part 1	United Kingdom	2	17 November 2003	Momentum Pictures		The first half of Series 1, the original 1989 film, and other extras
Creature Comforts – Series 1, Part 2	United Kingdom	2	5 April 2004	Momentum Pictures		The second half of Series 1, featuring many extras including ITV1 idents, Heat Electric adverts, and more
Creature Comforts – The Complete First Season	United States	1	27 September 2005	Sony Pictures Home Entertainment	08694	Features the original 1989 film in fullscreen as an extra
Creature Comforts – Complete Series 1	United Kingdom	2	31 October 2005	Momentum Pictures		Two-disc set of the first series.
Creature Comforts – Series 2, Part 1	United Kingdom	2	21 November 2005	Momentum Pictures		First half of Series 2, plus many making of extras.
Creature Comforts – Series 2, Part 2	United Kingdom and United States	2	20 February 2006	Momentum Pictures		Second half of Series 2, plus extras
Creature Comforts – The Complete Second Season	United States	1	24 October 2006	Sony Pictures Home Entertainment	14823	Two-disc set of the Second Series and the "Merry Christmas, Everybody" DVD release (see below)
Creature Comforts – Merry Christmas Everybody	United States	1	24 October 2006	Sony Pictures Home Entertainment		Also included in the Second Series DVD release
Creature Comforts – The Complete First and Second Seasons	United States	1	24 October 2006	Sony Pictures Home Entertainment		Two-disc set of the First and Second Series
Creature Comforts – Complete Series 2	United Kingdom	2	6 November 2006	Momentum Pictures		Three-disc set of the Second Series and "Merry Christmas Everybody"
Creature Comforts America – The Complete First Season	United States	1	9 October 2007	Sony Pictures Home Entertainment		The seven episodes made for the cancelled American version
Creature Comforts - Complete Series 3: In The USA	United Kingdom	2	24 November 2008	2 Entertain		The seven episodes made for the canceled American version

The television series (United Kingdom) is now available to watch on the official Aardman YouTube channel. ()

== Awards and nominations ==
Caption text
Year	Award	Catergy	Result
1991	Academy Awards	Best Animated Short Film	Won

== See also ==
- List of Creature Comforts episodes
