= Wesley Gardiner Thompson =

Canadian politician from Ontario

Member of the Ontario Provincial Parliament for Kent East
- In office August 4, 1943 – April 27, 1948
- Preceded by: Douglas Munro Campbell
- Succeeded by: Edward B. McMillan

Personal details
- Born: 1894
- Died: 1968 (aged 73–74)
- Party: Progressive Conservative

Wesley Gardiner Thompson (1894-1968) was a Canadian politician who was Progressive Conservative MPP for Kent East from 1943 to 1948.

An agriculturalist by profession, he served as Minister of Lands and Forests.

== See also ==
- 24th Parliament of Ontario
