= Jack Spence (politician) =

Canadian politician

Ontario MPP
- In office 1975–1977
- Preceded by: New riding
- Succeeded by: Jim McGuigan
- Constituency: Kent—Elgin
- In office 1967–1975
- Constituency: Kent
- In office 1955–1967
- Preceded by: Andrew Thomas Ward
- Succeeded by: Riding abolished
- Constituency: Kent East

Personal details
- Born: March 27, 1905 Muirkirk, Ontario
- Died: June 25, 1981 (aged 76) St. Thomas, Ontario
- Party: Liberal
- Occupation: Farmer

John Purvis Spence (March 27, 1905 – June 25, 1981) was a politician in Ontario, Canada. He was a Liberal member of the Legislative Assembly of Ontario from 1955 to 1977, representing the electoral districts of Kent East from 1955 to 1967, Kent from 1967 to 1975, and Kent—Elgin from 1975 to 1977.

He was born in Muirkirk, Ontario in 1905 and farmed in that area. In the 1940s he was a councillor and reeve of Orford Township and in 1949 became warden of Kent. He died in St. Thomas, Ontario in 1981 at the age of 76.
