= List of Creature Comforts episodes =

The following is a list of episodes from the British stop motion mockumentary series Creature Comforts and its American version.

The series originally aired on ITV in the UK and CBS in the US and is currently being repeated on Gold and SF2.

== The Pilot (1989) ==
No. in season	Title	Original release date
1	"Lip Synch: Creature Comforts"	15 July 1989
Animals in a zoo discuss their experiences and opinions of life in captivity. A depressed western lowland gorilla, a young hippopotamus, and a South American cougar complain about the lack of space in their enclosures, the frustration of being unable to get out as much as they would like, and their objection to British weather. By contrast, an elderly tarsier and nine-banded armadillo praise the zoo and the level of security it brings, while a family of polar bears discuss the benefits of zoos.

== The series ==
=== Season 1 (2003) ===
No. in season	Title	Original release date
1	"The Circus"	1 October 2003
Animals in a travelling circus such as an Indian elephant, an African lioness, some brown bears, a pig cannonball, a Holstein Friesian cow trapeze artist, and horses (many of whom are voiced by real circus performers) discuss their past experiences, their thoughts and philosophies on performing, and their job satisfaction. Other animals discuss what they think about watching the circus. This episode introduces recurring characters Fluffy the hamster, Pickles the guide Labrador Retriever, Sid and Nancy the rats, and Mazulu and Toto the Peruvian spider monkeys.
2	"Pets at the Vet's"	1 October 2003
Animals in a vet's waiting room talk about their experiences with doctors and the various effects surgery, medicine and medication have had on them. This episode introduces recurring characters Trixie the dog and Captain Cuddlepuss the cat (the series' most recurring characters), Anthony the pig, Clement the bloodhound, and Chappie the horse.
3	"Working Animals"	5 October 2003
The animals talk about their jobs, places of work, and job satisfaction. A German Shepherd speaks about his work as a police dog, an Egyptian plover comments on working on the teeth of Nile crocodiles, a bulldog laments about his irregular shift patterns as a guard dog, hens complain about how their routine gets repetitive, Pickles lists the views of her job as a guide dog, an barn owl describes the type of job he wants, mice in a laboratory praise their workplace for its social atmosphere, and a maggot on a fishing hook explains why positivity is important at work. This episode introduces recurring character Sapphire the bottlenose dolphin.
4	"The Sea"	12 October 2003
Marine animals talk about the sea, problems they have faced while swimming, and their thoughts on other marine life. This episode introduces recurring characters Brian the philosophical amoeba, Sue and Lorraine the walruses, and Megan and Gladys the seagulls.
5	"The Garden"	19 October 2003
Wildlife found in gardens discuss gardening, their favourite kinds of plants and flowers, and how to deal with garden pests. A frog describes his ideal garden, Gary the slug talks about his favourite plant, the burning bush, and a caterpillar argues with a butterfly about whether it's better to have a garden full of flowers or vegetables. This episode introduces recurring characters Dave the earthworm, Stan and Ted the baby birds, and Gary and Nigel the garden slugs.
6	"Feeding Time"	26 October 2003
The animals talk about foods. A pigeon worries if eating chicken makes her a cannibal, Anthony the pig complains of dirt on food being deadly, an old horse worries of humans eating fatty chips instead of healthy fruits, Sapphire the dolphin expresses her disgust for seafood, and a fly talks about his love of different types of poo. This episode introduces recurring characters Dennis the dung beetle and Spanner and Trousers the stray dogs, as well as seeing the return of Frank the tortoise, a character from the Heat Electric television adverts made by Aardman in the 1990s.
7	"The Beach"	2 November 2003
The animals discuss beaches, seaside resorts, and going on holiday. A crab tells of an unpleasant experience she had with a slimy fish in a rock pool, a seal reveals his favourite British holiday destinations, and Fluffy the hamster explains why he loves sunbathing but hates swimming. This episode introduces the Rudges.
8	"Pet Shop"	9 November 2003
Animals for sale in a pet shop discuss what qualities make a good pet, and how much they think they're worth. A chameleon voices her insecurities about never finding the right person, a cobra confesses how isolated and alone he feels in his tank, and a dog argues with a stick insect about who is the more interesting pet.
9	"What's It All About?"	16 November 2003
The animals debate and philosophise about the origins of life on Earth, the process of evolution, and whether life actually originated from another world as an alien race. Two sheep ponder the age-old question of which came first, the chicken or the egg, Fluffy explains why he thinks evolution doesn't work, the Rudges discuss whether they've reached their evolutionary pinnacle, and Dennis the dung beetle explains his theory of where humans came from.
10	"Being a Bird"	23 November 2003
Birds tell of their experiences and the joys of flying. A raven claims birds stay in the air through a mixture of happiness and magic, a peregrine falcon talks about the thrill of flying at great speed, four songbirds in a bird bath sing an upbeat melody, and a pigeon remembers when he surprised a family by accidentally falling through a skylight and into their kitchen.
11	"Is Anyone Out There?"	30 November 2003
The animals discuss the existence of extraterrestrial life, what they may look like, and the legitimacy of UFO sightings, while aliens living on Earth (some of whom are voiced by real foreign immigrants to the United Kingdom) talk about how they're adapting to life in a new place, as well as the new culture, customs and ideas they experience.
12	"Cats or Dogs?"	7 December 2003
Dogs and cats argue about who is the superior pet. Captain Cuddlepuss remembers all the times he has been attacked by dogs, a ginger tom cat expresses his dislike for the grotesque appearances of certain dog breeds, and Clement talks about how loyal he is despite being let down several times in his life.
13	"Merry Christmas"	25 December 2003
The animals discuss the positives and negatives of Christmas, as well as their own traditions, Christmas dinner, and buying presents. Pickles remembers when she tried to get a mistletoe kiss from a caretaker, Fluffy talks about the disappointment of getting a Christmas present you don't really want, a robin tries to remember the words to Jingle Bells, and two of Santa's reindeer explain what they like about their job.

=== Season 2 (2005–2006) ===
No. in season	Title	Original release date
1	"Beast in Show"	30 October 2005
Farm animals at a county show talk about taking part in the contests, checking out the competition, and breeding perfection. A pig stresses the importance of having a pedigree, a duck explains why a pond is essential for keeping waterfowl, and chickens discuss the politics of egg judging. This episode introduces two recurring characters Bill the Hare and Black the Pig.
2	"The Brood"	6 November 2005
Various animals talk about their families, whether it be children, siblings or parents, and they discuss the bonds and relationships they have with their relatives. This episode introduced regular characters Brian and Keith the Staffordshire Bull Terriers, Derek the Sharpei, Victor the Geordie Mouse and Muriel and Catherine the Bats.
3	"Pet Hates"	13 November 2005
The animals reveal what annoys them. A spider on a car's rearview mirror complains about reckless drivers, Behzad the police horse explains the best way to deal with rowdy drunks, and Clement tries to explain what a "pet hate" is while being constantly interrupted by the sound of a jackhammer. This episode introduces regular characters Behzad the horse and Nicola and Steve the pigs.
4	"Impressions"	20 November 2005
The animals talk about the impressions, Captain Cuddlepuss talks about making a good impression for Trixie, Fluffy talks about his impression of kippers, Gary and Nigel are capable of making chicken noises, a cluster of mussels discuss on cockatoos and cockatiels, and Steve tells Nicola that a cuckoo sound is a good impression of all time.
5	"Animals in the Hood"	27 November 2005
The Animals talk their opiniins about their homes and the areas they live in. An American alligator praises her home in the sewer, an ant talks through his method of brick-laying, limpets talk about their rock on the shore and Clement the Bloodhound takes pride in the structural quality of his kennel.
6	"Sport!"	4 December 2005
The Animals discuss fitness, their favourite sports and why they play them. Two blue wildebeest and a cheetah voice their opinions on racing, polar bear talks about the joys of fishing, dung beetles play a game of football with a ball of dung, a pair of scorpions practice duelling with their claws, and Trixie and Captain Cuddlepuss argue about whether darts should be classed as a sport or not. This episode is dedicated to the memory of the late Frank Philips, the voice of Frank the Tortoise.
7	"Monarchy Business"	11 December 2005
The animals discuss the British royal family, what they actually do, and whether or not Britain really needs them. Among the interviewees supporting the Royals are the Queen's corgis and the Tower of London's ravens, as well as some foreign tourists visiting Buckingham Palace, including an American Grizzly bear, a Kenyan wildebeest, an Indian elephant, and a family of Chinese giant pandas.
8	"Animal Magnetism"	18 December 2005
The animals talk about their love lives, relationships, and what they look for in potential mates. Nancy reveals what first attracted her to Sid, Behzad explains the importance of body odor in finding the perfect match, and Pickles describes the feeling of being in love, all of the while oblivious to her owner falling into a sewer.
9	"Merry Christmas Everybody!"	25 December 2005
Christmas time has come again, and the recurring characters all have a go at singing the classic Christmas carol 'Twelve Days of Christmas'. This special episode was longer than the other episodes of the series, at 22 minutes instead of the usual 10.
10	"Bed Time"	8 January 2006
The animals discuss their sleep patterns. A cat explains the problems of sleeping for night shift workers, a tortoise struggles to stay awake while lamenting about having to go to sleep, a woodlouse complains about his wife's snoring, and Spanner and Trousers list some of the strange places where they have slept, including in fields and under motorway bridges. This episode was dedicated to the late David Drew, who voiced Dave the Earthworm.
11	"Self Image"	15 January 2006
The animals discuss their appearances, dieting, body confidence, and the ethics of cosmetic surgery. Catherine the bat contemplates getting a nose job, a seal expresses her disgust at liposuction, a snake explains how a person's "inner sense" stops them eating certain things, and a cluster of mussels debate which of them is the best looking.
12	"Communication"	22 January 2006
The animals talk about languages, accents, dialects, and how they communicate with others. A sheep mimics a shepherd's whistle to demonstrate his flock's reaction, a dog explains how to tell when a donkey is angry, Victor points out the strange use of words in the Geordie accent, and Mazulu and Toto contemplate how language has evolved through history.
13	"Safari Park"	29 January 2006
Animals in a safari park (some of whom are voiced by the staff of Longleat Safari Park) discuss life in captivity and their opinions on the other animals they share their home with. A South African giraffe hopes to get a work permit so he can stay at the park, a common ostrich describes her daily routine, and a red deer talks about the laziness of the park's hippos and his affection for a Grant's zebra named Katie. The owner of Longleat, Alexander Thynn, 7th Marquess of Bath, features in this episode as the voice of an African lion.

=== Series 3 in the USA (2007) ===
No. in season	Title	Original release date
Special	"Comic Relief: Greetings from Creature Comforts"	16 March 2007
Broadcast in the UK as part of Comic Relief's Red Nose Day, this was a special edited from the American version.
1	"Animal Magnetism" / "Secrets & Lies" / "Pets at the Vet"	4 June 2007
Animals from across America are interviewed on a variety of topics. In the first third of the episode, the topic is going to the doctor and the effects of medicine and medication. The second topic is how good the Animals are at keeping secrets and what the worst lies they've ever told are, and the final topic is love, attraction and relationships.
2	"Self Image" / "Winging It" / "Art"	11 June 2007
3	"Winter" / "The Zoo"	18 June 2007
In the first half of the episode, the topic is what the Animals like and dislike winter, and how they get through it in one piece. The second half, in a call-back to the original short, focuses on animals in zoos and what they think about life in captivity.
4	"Working" / "For the Birds" / "Love Animal Style"	July 2007
5	"Growing Up" / "Fears & Phobias" / "Something's Afoot"	23 July 2007
In The First Half of the episode, a deer talks about things about his fear, the pigs talks about Phobias and the poodles talks about Fears. The Second Half, the pigs talk about the female pig's babies, the black labrador talks about growing of puppys and a black sheep speaks about growing up. and In The Third Half, the dachshunds talk about something's afoot.
6	"Communication" / "Feeding Time" / "Parrot Tongue Twister"	October 9, 2007
7	"Great Outdoors" / "Pet Peeves" / "Talent Show"	October 9, 2007
