= Archibald McKellar =

Canadian politician

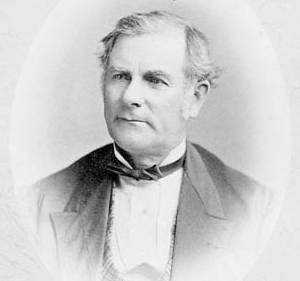
- Source: Library and Archives Canada

Leader of the Ontario Liberal Party
- In office 1867–1868
- Preceded by: George Brown
- Succeeded by: Edward Blake

Member of the Legislative Assembly of Ontario for Bothwell
- In office 1867–1875
- Preceded by: first member
- Succeeded by: riding dissolved

Member of the Legislative Assembly of Ontario for Kent East
- In office January 18 – July 25, 1875
- Preceded by: first member
- Succeeded by: Daniel McCraney

Personal details
- Born: February 3, 1816 Inveraray, Scotland
- Died: February 11, 1894 (aged 78) Hamilton, Ontario
- Other political affiliations: Ontario Liberal Party

Archibald McKellar (3 February 1816 – 11 February 1894) was briefly leader of Canada's Ontario Liberal Party from 1867 to 1868 and, unofficially, the first Leader of the Opposition in Ontario's new provincial legislature (though he was not officially recognised as such) and went on to serve as Commissioner of Public Works in Ontario Premier Oliver Mowat's first government.

He was born near Inveraray, Scotland in 1816 and came to Upper Canada with his parents in 1817. He helped on the family farm in Kent County and was also part owner of a large sawmill at Chatham. He served in the militia during the Upper Canada Rebellion, becoming a major in the Kent Battalion. McKellar later moved to Chatham where he served on the town council and was also reeve from 1856 to 1857. He married Lucy McNab in 1836. McNab died in 1857. In 1857, he was elected to the Legislative Assembly of the Province of Canada for Kent and he served until Confederation. He was defeated by Rufus Stephenson when he ran in Kent in the 1867 election, but he was elected to the 1st Parliament of Ontario for Bothwell in 1867 and 1871. He married a second time to Mary Catherine Powell in 1874.

He was elected in the new district of Kent East in 1875. However, the opposition had accused him of taking advantage of his position to award contracts to his friends. Although he was cleared of any wrongdoing, he retired from politics in 1875 and was appointed sheriff in Wentworth County. He died in Hamilton in 1894.

The township of McKellar in Parry Sound District was named in his honour.

== Electoral history ==
1867 Ontario general election: Bothwell
Party	Candidate	Votes	%
Liberal	Archibald McKellar	1,242	51.45
Conservative	Mr. Kirby	1,172	48.55
Total valid votes		2,414	83.16
Eligible voters		2,903	
Liberal pickup new district.			
Source: Elections Ontario

1871 Ontario general election: Bothwell
Party	Candidate	Votes	%	±%
Liberal	Archibald McKellar	1,304	55.02	+3.57
Conservative	Mr. Kerby	1,066	44.98	−3.57
Turnout		2,370	72.17	−10.99
Eligible voters		3,284		
Liberal hold		Swing		+3.57
Source: Elections Ontario

Ontario provincial by-election, January 1872: Bothwell Ministerial by-election
Party	Candidate	Votes
Liberal	Archibald McKellar	Acclaimed
Source: History of the Electoral Districts, Legislatures and Ministries of the Province of Ontario

1875 Ontario general election: Kent East
Party	Candidate	Votes	%
Liberal	Archibald McKellar	1,425	51.76
Conservative	J.G. Laird	1,328	48.24
Turnout		2,753	66.27
Eligible voters		4,154	
Liberal pickup new district.			
Source: Elections Ontario
