= Philip Henry Bowyer =

Canadian politician

Ontario MPP
- In office 1905–1911
- Preceded by: John Lee
- Succeeded by: Walter Renwick Ferguson
- Constituency: Kent East

Personal details
- Born: September 7, 1882
- Died: January 24, 1933 (aged 50)
- Party: Conservative
- Spouse: Agnes Maria Yocom (m. 1882)

Philip Henry Bowyer (February 6, 1860 – January 24, 1933) was an editor, publisher and politician in Ontario, Canada. He represented Kent East in the Legislative Assembly of Ontario from 1905 to 1911 as a Conservative member.

He was born in Toronto. In 1882, Bowyer married Agnes Yocom. From 1880 to 1893, he was editor of the Ridgetown Standard; in 1895, he became editor of the Ridgetown Dominion.
