= James Dawson (politician) =

Canadian politician

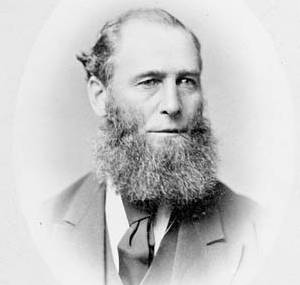
- James Dawson; Source: Library and Archives Canada

Member of the Legislative Assembly of Ontario for Kent
- In office 1871–1874

Personal details
- Born: June 5, 1823 Wolfe Island, Upper Canada
- Died: November 3, 1886 (aged 63) Lambton County, Ontario
- Party: Liberal

James Dawson (June 5, 1823 – November 3, 1886) was an Ontario political figure. He represented Kent in the Legislative Assembly of Ontario as a Liberal member from 1871 to 1874.

He served as warden for Lambton County. He died of bladder cancer in 1886. At the time of his death he had been serving as postmaster for Sarnia. He was buried at Our Lady of Mercy Roman Catholic Cemetery in Lambton County.

== Electoral history ==
1871 Ontario general election: Kent
Party	Candidate	Votes	%	±%
Liberal	James Dawson	1,382	53.55	+2.41
Conservative	John Smith	1,199	46.45	−2.41
Turnout		2,581	61.15	−16.84
Eligible voters		4,221		
Liberal hold		Swing		+2.41
Source: Elections Ontario
