= George Ewan McCraney =

Canadian politician

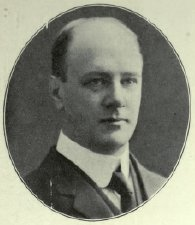

Member of the Canadian Parliament for Saskatchewan
- In office 1906–1908
- Preceded by: The electoral district was created in 1905.
- Succeeded by: The electoral district was abolished in 1907.

Member of the Canadian Parliament for Saskatoon
- In office 1908–1917
- Preceded by: The electoral district was created in 1907.
- Succeeded by: James Robert Wilson

Personal details
- Born: July 23, 1868 Bothwell, Ontario
- Died: March 18, 1921 (aged 52)
- Party: Liberal
- Relations: Daniel McCraney, father
- Education: University of Toronto

George Ewan McCraney (July 23, 1868 – March 18, 1921) was a Canadian lawyer and politician.

Born in Bothwell, Ontario, his father was Daniel McCraney, a lawyer and political figure who represented Kent East in the Legislative Assembly of Ontario. McCraney was educated at the University of Toronto where he graduated a B.A. in 1892 and an LL.B. in 1895. He was first returned to the House of Commons of Canada at a by-election held in February 1906 for the riding of Saskatchewan, after the resignation of the sitting MP, John Henderson Lamont. A Liberal, he was re-elected in 1908 and 1911 for the riding of Saskatoon. He did not stand for re-election in 1917.
