= John Lee (Canadian politician) =

Canadian politician

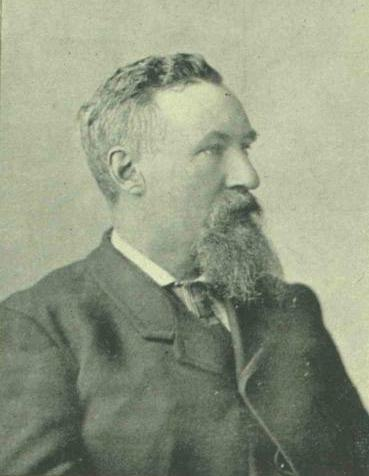

Ontario MPP
- In office 1901–1904
- Preceded by: Robert Ferguson
- Succeeded by: Philip Henry Bowyer
- Constituency: Kent East

Personal details
- Born: March 5, 1845 Orford township, Kent County, Canada West
- Died: January 16, 1915 (aged 69) Kent, Ontario
- Party: Liberal
- Spouse: Rebecca Sophia Attridge (m. 1865)
- Occupation: Farmer

John "Big John" Lee (March 5, 1845 – January 16, 1915) was a farmer and politician in Ontario, Canada. He represented Kent East in the Legislative Assembly of Ontario from 1901 to 1904 as a Liberal.

The son of John and Sarah Lee, both natives of Ireland, he was born in Orford township and was educated there. In 1865, he married Rebecca Attridge. He was a Methodist. Lee imported Lincoln sheep from England to raise on his farm.

Lee served on the Orford township council from 1869 to 1870, was deputy reeve in 1872, was reeve from 1873 to 1878 and was warden for Kent County in 1875. He was also a justice of the peace. He was first elected to the Ontario assembly in a 1901 by-election held following the death of Robert Ferguson.
