= Saskatchewan (electoral district) =

Saskatchewan was a federal electoral district in Saskatchewan, Canada, that was represented in the House of Commons of Canada from 1906 to 1908.

This riding was created following the admission of Saskatchewan as a province into Canadian Confederation in 1905, from the former Northwest Territories riding Provisional District of Saskatchewan. The sitting member in the prior riding at the time was John Henderson Lamont, who resigned in 1905.

The only member actually elected to this seat was George Ewan McCraney, in a by-election in 1906. The electoral district was abolished in 1907 when it was redistributed into the ridings of Battleford, Prince Albert, and Saskatoon.

== Election results ==
By-election: Resignation of Mr. John Henderson Lamont, 5 September 1905

By-election on 6 February 1906
Party	Candidate	Votes
Liberal	MCCRANEY, George Ewan	acclaimed

== See also ==
- List of Canadian federal electoral districts
- Historical federal electoral districts of Canada
