= Philip James Henry =

Canadian politician from Ontario

Member of the Ontario Provincial Parliament for Kent East
- In office September 30, 1929 – August 13, 1933
- Preceded by: Christopher Gardiner
- Succeeded by: Douglas Munro Campbell

Personal details
- Died: January 3, 1934
- Party: Conservative

Philip James Henry (died January 3, 1934) was a Canadian politician who was Conservative MPP for Kent East from 1929 to 1933.

== See also ==
- 18th Parliament of Ontario
