= Walter Renwick Ferguson =

Canadian politician from Ontario

Member of the Ontario Provincial Parliament for Kent East
- In office December 11, 1911 – September 23, 1919
- Preceded by: Philip Henry Bowyer
- Succeeded by: James B. Clark

Personal details
- Party: Liberal

Walter Renwick Ferguson was a Canadian politician who was Liberal MPP for Kent East from 1911 to 1919.

== See also ==
- 13th Parliament of Ontario
- 14th Parliament of Ontario
