= James Clancy (politician) =

Canadian politician and businessman

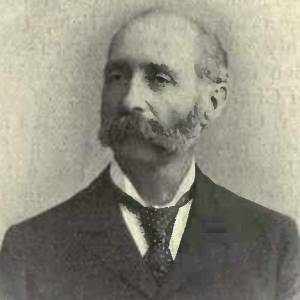

Member of the Legislative Assembly of Ontario for Kent West
- In office 1883–1894
- Preceded by: Edward Robinson
- Succeeded by: Thomas Pardo

Member of the House of Commons of Canada for Bothwell
- In office 1896–1903
- Preceded by: David Mills
- Succeeded by: riding dissolved

Personal details
- Born: July 21, 1844 Mosa Township, Middlesex County, Canada West
- Died: January 10, 1921 (aged 76)
- Party: Conservative
- Spouse: Emily McIntosh
- Occupation: merchant

James Clancy (July 21, 1844 – January 10, 1921) was an Ontario farmer, businessman and political figure. He represented Kent West in the Legislative Assembly of Ontario from 1883 to 1894 and Bothwell in the House of Commons of Canada from 1896 to 1904 as a Conservative member.

He was born in Mosa Township, Middlesex County, Canada West in 1844, the son of Patrick Clancy, an Irish immigrant. In 1868, he married Emily McIntosh. He was a lumber merchant in Wallaceburg. Clancy served on the town council for Dresden and was reeve of Chatham. In 1896, he defeated David Mills to win a seat in the House of Commons. He ran unsuccessfully for the federal seat representing Lambton West in 1904 after the riding of Bothwell was redistributed, and for the provincial seat representing Kent West in 1905. Clancy served as provincial auditor from 1905 to 1920.

== Electoral record ==
1896 Canadian federal election: Bothwell
Party	Candidate	Votes
Conservative	James Clancy	2,587
Liberal	David Mills	2,528

1900 Canadian federal election: Bothwell
Party	Candidate	Votes
Conservative	James Clancy	2,547
Liberal	David A. Gordon	2,430
