= John Joseph Hawkins =

Canadian politician

Member of the Canadian Parliament for Bothwell
- In office 1882–1884
- Preceded by: David Mills
- Succeeded by: David Mills

Personal details
- Born: 1840 Brantford, Upper Canada
- Died: June 2, 1916 (aged 75–76)
- Party: Liberal-Conservative
- Spouse: Ellen Harrington

John Joseph Hawkins (1840 – June 2, 1916) was a grocer and political figure in Ontario, Canada. He represented Bothwell in the House of Commons of Canada from 1882 to 1884 as a Liberal-Conservative member.

He was born in Brantford, Upper Canada, the son of John Hawkins and Mary Macdougall, and was educated there. In 1862, Hawkins married Ellen M. Harrington. He served as a member of the first Brantford city council and of the council for Brant County. Hawkins ran unsuccessfully for a seat in the Ontario legislative assembly in 1873 and was an unsuccessful candidate in the 1878 federal election. His election in 1882 was overturned after an appeal and David Mills was declared elected in 1884.

1882 Canadian federal election: Bothwell
Party	Candidate	Votes
Liberal–Conservative	John Joseph Hawkins	1,520
Liberal	David Mills	1,504
