= Douglas Munro Campbell =

Canadian politician

Ontario MPP
- In office 1934–1943
- Preceded by: Philip James Henry
- Succeeded by: Wesley Gardiner Thompson
- Constituency: Kent East

Personal details
- Born: February 25, 1889 Harwich Township, Kent County
- Died: 1986
- Party: Liberal
- Spouse: Janet Rowe
- Occupation: Farmer

Douglas Munro Campbell (February 25, 1889 – 1986) was a farmer and politician in Ontario, Canada. He represented Kent East in the Legislative Assembly of Ontario from 1934 to 1943 as a Liberal and then Liberal-Progressive member.

The son of Malcolm Campbell and Robina Munro, both natives of Scotland, he was born in Harwich Township, Kent County and was educated in Ridgetown and Chatham. In 1914, he married Janet Rowe, the daughter of Major Rowe.

Campbell was elected to the Ontario assembly in a 1934 by-election. He was reelected in 1934 and 1937.
