= David Mills (Canadian politician) =

Canadian politician and Supreme Court judge (1831–1903)

The Honourable David Mills PC
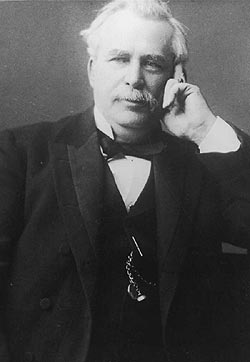

Member of Parliament for Bothwell
- In office September 20, 1867 – June 19, 1882
- Succeeded by: John Joseph Hawkins
- In office February 25, 1884 – June 22, 1896
- Preceded by: John Joseph Hawkins
- Succeeded by: James Clancy

Canadian Senator from Ontario
- In office November 13, 1896 – February 7, 1902
- Appointed by: Wilfrid Laurier

Puisne Justice of the Supreme Court of Canada
- In office February 8, 1902 – May 8, 1903
- Nominated by: Wilfrid Laurier
- Preceded by: John Wellington Gwynne
- Succeeded by: Wallace Nesbitt

Superintendent-general on Indian Affairs
- In office October 24, 1876 – October 8, 1878
- Preceded by: David Laird
- Succeeded by: John A. Macdonald

Personal details
- Born: March 18, 1831 Orford Township, Upper Canada
- Died: May 8, 1903 (aged 72) Ottawa, Ontario, Canada
- Party: Liberal
- Education: University of Michigan

David Mills, PC (March 18, 1831 – May 8, 1903) was a Canadian politician, author, poet and puisne justice of the Supreme Court of Canada.

== Early life and education ==
He was born in Palmyra, in southwestern Upper Canada (now Ontario). His father, Nathaniel Mills, was one of the first settlers in the area. Mills served as superintendent of schools for Kent County from 1856 to 1865. He then attended the University of Michigan School of law, graduating with honors in 1867 with an LL.B degree.

He published The Present and Future Political Aspects of Canada in 1860 and The Blunders of the Dominion Government in connection with the North-West Territory in 1871.

== Political career ==
Mills was first elected to the House of Commons of Canada as a Liberal Member of Parliament (MP) in the 1867 federal election and re-elected in four subsequent votes until being defeated in the 1882 election. He was an opponent of dual representation (the practice in which someone could simultaneously be a member of parliament as well as a member of the Ontario or Quebec legislature. He unsuccessfully introduced a private member's bill to abolish this practice, and continued to advocate for this until it was abolished in 1873.

During the debates surrounding the creation of the Supreme Court of Canada in 1875, Mills was one of the few exceptions who opposed granting the court jurisdiction over provincial law, as he viewed it as contrary to Canada's federalist structure.

He returned to Parliament through an 1884 by-election. He was re-elected in subsequent elections until his defeat in the 1896 election despite this being the election that brought the Liberals back to power.

He served as Minister of the Interior in the Cabinet of Alexander Mackenzie from 1876 to 1878. Sir Wilfrid Laurier appointed Mills to the Senate of Canada after he lost his Commons seat in 1896, and appointed him to Cabinet as Minister of Justice and Leader of the Government in the Canadian Senate. He resigned from the Senate and Cabinet in 1902.

Mills appointment as Minister of Justice and Attorney General in 1897 was controversial in that he had no legal experience practicing before a court or in a judicial proceeding. The Canada Legal Journal in its criticism for his lack of practical experience described Mills as an "academic" and "mere book-worm" who studied law as a science.

As Minister of Justice, Mills was sympathetic to the Roman Catholic cause in Ontario and complaints about under representation in the judiciary. He maintained a list of suitable catholic appointees.

== Justice of the Supreme Court of Canada ==
On February 8, 1902, Mills was appointed to the Supreme Court of Canada by Prime Minister Wilfrid Laurier to replace Justice John Wellington Gwynne after he died in office on January 7, 1902. Justice Gwynne had apparently agreed to retire in 1896 after pressure from Charles Tupper, but when the Conservative government failed to find a replacement, he agreed to stay in his post. When the Laurier government came into power, they found a replacement in David Mills, however, Laurier refused to interfere with the Court and entice or force Gwynne's retirement. Mills did not have significant legal experience, and did not begin practicing law until the 1880s despite graduating law school in 1855. Mills was among a series of patronage appointments of Laurier, with the role on the Court promised well before the appointment. As justice minister, Mills blocked the appointment of other judges to the Supreme Court to hold his position while also refusing attempts to appoint him to lesser positions. Mills' appointment was widely criticized for his age, lack of practical legal experience and the nature of the patronage appointment.

Mills' judicial philosophy was in fact not scientific or mechanical, but instead Mills noted the courts had a duty "make the words of the statute yield to its reason and expressed intention." Mills was conscious of social changes and values in his decisions, but also strongly considered "reason" as part of his judicial process. However, Mills' reputation as an academic lawyer meant his decisions lacked credibility in the Canadian legal community.

Mills served on the Court for one year until his death at the age of 72 on May 8, 1903. In their memorial article, the Canadian Law Times was unforgiving, noting his appointment was "unsatisfactory" and continued many of the criticisms of his appointment only a year earlier.

Historian Ian Bushnell describes Mills as the "first true judicial statesman", and "renowned for his sense of justice and his scruples," but notes his legacy was largely erased from the Canadian legal system.

== Electoral record ==
1867 Canadian federal election: Bothwell
Party	Candidate	Votes
Liberal	David Mills	1,333
Conservative	David Glass	1,224
Source: Canadian Elections Database

1872 Canadian federal election
Party	Candidate	Votes
Liberal	David Mills	1,727
Unknown	C. R. Atkinson	1,135

1874 Canadian federal election: Bothwell
Party	Candidate	Votes
Liberal	David Mills	1,600
Unknown	? Dobbyn	1,137

Mr. David Mills was appointed Minister of the Interior and Superintendent General of Indian Affairs, 24 October 1876:

By-election on 15 November 1876
Party	Candidate	Votes
Liberal	David Mills	1,650
Unknown	James Dawson	1,142

1878 Canadian federal election: Bothwell
Party	Candidate	Votes
Liberal	David Mills	1,852
Liberal–Conservative	John Joseph Hawkins	
Source: Canadian Elections Database

1882 Canadian federal election: Bothwell
Party	Candidate	Votes
Liberal–Conservative	John Joseph Hawkins	1,520
Liberal	David Mills	1,504

Election declared void Mr. J.J. Hawkins was declared not duly elected and was unseated by judgement of Supreme Court. The seat was awarded to his opponent, 25 February 1884:

By-election on 25 February 1884
Party	Candidate	Votes
Liberal	David Mills	acclaimed

1887 Canadian federal election: Bothwell
Party	Candidate	Votes
Liberal	David Mills	2,182
Conservative	Geo. M. D. Mitchell	2,161

1891 Canadian federal election: Bothwell
Party	Candidate	Votes
Liberal	David Mills	2,006
Conservative	G. R. Langford	1,456
Unknown	A. McLartey	1,088

1896 Canadian federal election: Bothwell
Party	Candidate	Votes
Conservative	James Clancy	2,587
Liberal	David Mills	2,528

Parliament of Canada
Preceded by Sir Oliver Mowat	Leader of the Government in the Senate of Canada; 1897–1902	Succeeded by Sir Richard William Scott
