= James B. Clark (Canadian politician) =

Canadian politician

Ontario MPP
- In office 1919–1920
- Preceded by: Walter Renwick Ferguson
- Succeeded by: Manning Doherty
- Constituency: Kent East

Personal details
- Born: October 14, 1867; Harwich Township, Ontario
- Died: May 14, 1943 (aged 75); Chatham, Ontario, Canada
- Political party: United Farmers of Ontario
- Spouse: Maria C. Scarlett
- Profession: Farmer

James B. Clark (October 14, 1867 – May 14, 1943) was an Ontario farmer and political figure. He represented Kent East from 1919 to January 1920 as a United Farmers of Ontario member.

He was born in Harwich Township, Ontario, the son of William B. Clark. In 1889, he married Maria C. Scarlett. He was a member of the township council and served as reeve from 1909 to 1910. Clark also served as a member of the council for Kent County. He died in Chatham in 1943 and was buried at Evergreen Cemetery at Blenheim.
