= Jim McGuigan =

Canadian politician

Ontario MPP
- In office 1987–1990
- Preceded by: New riding
- Succeeded by: Pat Hayes
- Constituency: Essex-Kent
- In office 1977–1987
- Preceded by: Jack Spence
- Succeeded by: Riding abolished
- Constituency: Kent—Elgin

Personal details
- Born: November 9, 1923 Cedar Springs, Chatham-Kent, Ontario
- Died: March 5, 1998 (aged 74) Chatham, Ontario
- Party: Liberal
- Spouse: Mona
- Children: 4
- Occupation: Farmer

James Fitzgerald McGuigan (November 9, 1923 – March 5, 1998) was a politician in Ontario, Canada. He was a Liberal member of the Legislative Assembly of Ontario from 1977 to 1990.

== Background ==
McGuigan was educated at Ontario Agricultural College, and worked as a farmer. He served as the president of several farming organizations, including the Kent County Vegetable Growers Association, the Kent County Federation of Agriculture and the Ontario Fruit and Vegetable Growers' Association. He also served as chair of the Raleigh-Harwich Public School Board, and was an executive member of the Ontario Federation of Agriculture from 1973 to 1977. McGuigan was known as an agricultural innovator. He pioneered the use of plastic greenhouses for tobacco production. He also experimented with the production, pre-cooling and shipment of strawberries to markets in Ontario and Quebec. Together with his wife Mona, they raised four children on their farm in Cedar Springs, Chatham-Kent, Ontario.

== Politics ==
He was elected to the Ontario legislature in the 1977 provincial election, defeating Progressive Conservative Don Luckham by 641 votes in the southwestern Ontario riding of Kent—Elgin. In the 1981 election, he defeated PC challenger Wes Thompson by 337 votes.

The Liberal Party made an electoral breakthrough in the 1985 provincial election, and McGuigan was re-elected by a significant margin. Following the election, the Liberals were able to form a minority government with support from the Ontario New Democratic Party. During the next five years he was appointed as parliamentary assistant to several ministers including the Energy, Natural Resources, Transportation and Agriculture.

Ontario's electoral map was redistributed before the 1987 election, and McGuigan was forced to face NDP incumbent Pat Hayes in the new riding of Essex—Kent. McGuigan won by 1,063 votes, as the Liberal Party won a landslide majority across the province.

The NDP defeated the Liberals in the 1990 provincial election, and Hayes defeated McGuigan by almost 6,000 votes. He retired from politics after his defeat.

== After politics ==
In 1992, he was inducted into the Kent Agricultural Hall of Fame. He died at Chatham Public General Hospital in 1998.
