= John Smith (Kent MPP) =

Ontario tanner and political figure

John Smith was an Ontario tanner and political figure. He represented Kent in the 1st Legislative Assembly of Ontario as a Liberal member.

He was born in England. Smith also served as mayor of Chatham.

== Electoral history ==
1867 Ontario general election: Kent
Party	Candidate	Votes	%
Liberal	John Smith	1,486	51.14
Conservative	Mr. McMichael	1,420	48.86
Total valid votes		2,906	77.99
Eligible voters		3,726	
Liberal pickup new district.			
Source: Elections Ontario

1871 Ontario general election: Kent
Party	Candidate	Votes	%	±%
Liberal	James Dawson	1,382	53.55	+2.41
Conservative	John Smith	1,199	46.45	−2.41
Turnout		2,581	61.15	−16.84
Eligible voters		4,221		
Liberal hold		Swing		+2.41
Source: Elections Ontario
