= Daniel McCraney =

Canadian politician

Member of the Legislative Assembly of Ontario for Kent East
- In office September 16, 1875 – February 28, 1885
- Preceded by: Archibald McKellar
- Succeeded by: Robert Ferguson

Personal details
- Born: July 1, 1834 Trafalgar Township, Upper Canada
- Died: February 28, 1885 (aged 50)
- Party: Liberal
- Children: George Ewan; William

Daniel McCraney (July 1, 1834 – February 28, 1885) was an Ontario lawyer and political figure. He represented Kent East in the Legislative Assembly of Ontario from 1875 to 1885 as a Liberal member.

He was born in Trafalgar Township, Upper Canada in 1834, the son of Hiram McCraney. McCraney studied in Oakville, went on to study law and was called to the bar in 1871. In 1866, he had married Janet Ewan. He set up practice in Bothwell. McCraney served as mayor of Bothwell from 1868 to 1873. He was first elected to the Ontario assembly in 1875 after Archibald McKellar retired from politics. He died in office in 1885.

McCraney Township in Nipissing District was named after him.

His son George Ewan was a member of the Canadian House of Commons from Saskatoon and his brother William was also an MP and mayor of Oakville.

== Electoral history ==
Ontario provincial by-election, September 1875: Kent East Resignation of Archibald McKellar
Party	Candidate	Votes	%	±%
Liberal	Daniel McCraney	1,509	52.87	+1.11
Conservative	J.G. Laird	1,345	47.13	−1.11
Total valid votes		2,854		
Liberal hold		Swing		+1.11
Source: History of the Electoral Districts, Legislatures and Ministries of the Province of Ontario

1879 Ontario general election: Kent East
Party	Candidate	Votes	%	±%
Liberal	Daniel McCraney	1,774	54.91	+2.03
Conservative	Mr. Trevice	1,457	45.09	−2.03
Total valid votes		3,231	58.60	
Eligible voters		5,514		
Liberal hold		Swing		+2.03
Source: Elections Ontario
