= Archibald Clement Calder =

Canadian politician from Ontario

Member of the Ontario Provincial Parliament for Kent West
- In office December 1, 1926 – April 3, 1934
- Preceded by: Robert Livingstone Brackin
- Succeeded by: Arthur St. Clair Gordon

Personal details
- Party: Progressive Conservative

Archibald Clement Calder was a Canadian politician from the Progressive Conservative Party of Ontario. He represented Kent West in the Legislative Assembly of Ontario from 1926 to 1934.

== See also ==
- 17th Parliament of Ontario
- 18th Parliament of Ontario
