= Manning Doherty =

Canadian politician

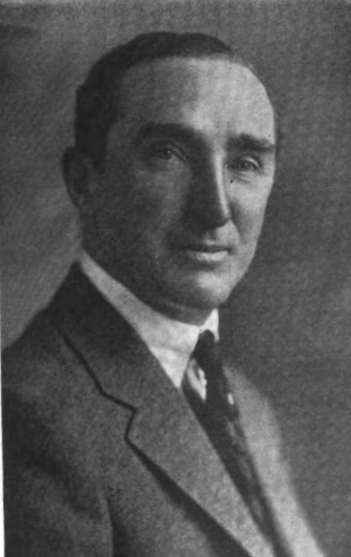

Ontario MPP
- In office 1920–1926
- Preceded by: James B. Clark
- Succeeded by: Christopher Gardiner
- Constituency: Kent East

Personal details
- Born: Manning William Doherty; September 27, 1875 Peel, Ontario, Canada
- Died: September 26, 1938 (aged 62) Toronto, Ontario, Canada
- Party: Labour; Progressive
- Spouse: Antionette Cassidy

Manning William Doherty (September 27, 1875 - September 26, 1938) was a farmer, businessman and politician serving as Ontario's Minister of Agriculture during the United Farmers of Ontario-Labour government of 1919 to 1923 and as leader of the Progressives (as the UFO had become known) in Opposition before leaving provincial politics.

== Early life ==
Doherty was the descendant of an old pioneer family that immigrated to Upper Canada from Ireland. His great-grandfather, Bernard Doherty, arrived in York (present-day Toronto) in 1812 and was offered a farm on the land now bordered by Queen Street West, Yonge Street, University Avenue, and College Street - then on the outskirts of town but today the heart of Downtown Toronto. He rejected the offer as too low and wet for agricultural purposes and instead accepted {500 ac [200 ha]) in what is now Peel County. The property remained in the Doherty family and was 300 ac (120 ha} of the original homestead was inherited and farmed by Manning Doherty, Bernard Doherty's great-grandson. As a child, Doherty attended Toronto Township School Section No. 11, Hanlan.

Doherty graduated from Upper Canada College and then earned a Bachelor of Scientific Agriculture from the University of Toronto's Ontario Agricultural College (became part of the University of Guelph since 1964) in 1895. He then studied at Cornell University where he received his master's degree before returning to the Ontario Agricultural College to teach from 1898 to 1902 as an associate professor.

== Political career ==
=== UFO ===
He was a supporter of the Conservative Party initially before being attracted to the agrarian movement and the fledgling United Farmers. He became vice-president of the United Farmers of Ontario and director of the United Farmers Co-operative Company.

Shortly after the 1919 provincial election in which the UFO won an upset victory Manning was appointed agriculture minister in the government of E.C. Drury and entered the Ontario legislature by means of a by-election. As Agriculture Minister, Doherty encouraged co-operative marketing for agricultural products serving until the government's defeat in the 1923 provincial election. Doherty was personally re-elected to the legislature in his riding of Kent East.

=== Progressives ===
Doherty served as acting leader of the Progressives through the 1924 legislative session but announced at the beginning of this tenure that he would not be seeking the leadership permanently. Doherty remained leader until January 1925 when the Progressive caucus chose William Raney as its leader after Doherty refused to reconsider his retirement.

Despite the fact that the UFO/Progressives were the second largest party in the Ontario legislature following the 1923 provincial election, Doherty did not become Leader of the Opposition since Conservative Premier Howard Ferguson used an announcement from UFO general secretary James J. Morrison was withdrawing from party politics as a pretext to recognise the third place Liberals as the official opposition, despite Doherty's protests. The parliamentary wing of the UFO and its non-parliamentary wing had been at loggerheads throughout the party's time in government and Morrison's statement was issued without consulting UFO members of the legislature, who subsequently became officially known as the Progressive group due in part to the dispute with Morrison's wing of the UFO.

=== Conservatives ===
Doherty resigned his seat in the provincial legislature in 1926 in order to campaign in support of the federal Conservatives led by Arthur Meighen. He considered running as a federal Conservative candidate against former Liberal Labour minister John Campbell Elliott in Middlesex West win the 1926 federal election but, in the end, did not run.

== After politics ==
Following his retirement from politics, Doherty focussed his efforts on his business interests, principally in the brokerage firm of Doherty, Roadhouse and Company. He became treasurer of the Toronto Stock Exchange in 1936 and was its vice-president when he died in 1938.

His son Brian Doherty was a playwright.

Party political offices
| Preceded by E.C. Drury | Leader of the United Farmers of Ontario/Progressives; 1924–1925 | Succeeded by William Raney |
