= George Parry (Ontario politician) =

Canadian politician

George William Parry

MPP for Kent West
- In office June 4, 1945 – September 24, 1963
- Preceded by: Arthur St. Clair Gordon
- Succeeded by: Darcy McKeough

Personal details
- Born: April 9, 1889 Chatham, Ontario
- Died: October 30, 1968 (aged 79) Chatham, Ontario
- Party: Ontario Progressive Conservative Party
- Occupation: farmer

George William Parry (April 9, 1889 – October 30, 1968) was a Canadian politician who was a Member of Provincial Parliament in Legislative Assembly of Ontario from 1945 to 1963. He represented the riding of Kent West for the Ontario Progressive Conservative Party. He was a farmer.
