= Kent East (provincial electoral district) =

Ontario electoral district

Defunct provincial electoral district
- Legislature: Legislative Assembly of Ontario
- District created: 1875
- District abolished: 1967
- First contested: 1875
- Last contested: 1963

Demographics
- Census division: Kent County
- Census subdivision(s): Bothwell, Camden, Chatham Township, Dresden, Howard, Orford, Ridgetown, Thamesville, Wallaceburg, Zone

Kent East was an electoral riding in Ontario, Canada. It was created in 1875 when the riding of Bothwell was split into the ridings of Kent East and Kent West. It was abolished in 1966 before the 1967 election when the ridings of Kent East and Kent West were merged to form the riding of Kent.

== Members of Provincial Parliament ==
Bothwell
Assembly	Years	Member	Party
1st	1867–1871	Archibald McKellar	Liberal
2nd	1871–1875	Archibald McKellar	Liberal
Bothwell Split into Kent West and Kent East
Kent East
3rd	1875–1875	Archibald McKellar	Liberal
3rd	1875–1879	Daniel McCraney	Liberal
4th	1879–1883	Daniel McCraney	Liberal
5th	1883–1885	Daniel McCraney	Liberal
5th	1885–1886	Robert Ferguson	Liberal
6th	1886–1890	Robert Ferguson	Liberal
7th	1890–1894	Robert Ferguson	Liberal
8th	1894–1898	Robert Ferguson	Liberal
9th	1898–1901	Robert Ferguson	Liberal
9th	1901–1902	John Lee	Liberal
10th	1902–1904	John Lee	Liberal
11th	1905–1908	Philip Henry Bowyer	Conservative
12th	1908–1911	Philip Henry Bowyer	Conservative
13th	1911–1914	Walter Renwick Ferguson	Liberal
14th	1914–1919	Walter Renwick Ferguson	Liberal
15th	1919–1920	James B. Clark	United Farmers
15th	1920–1923	Manning Doherty	United Farmers
16th	1923–1926	Manning Doherty	United Farmers
17th	1926–1929	Christopher Gardiner	Progressive
18th	1929–1933	Philip James Henry	Conservative
18th	1934–1934	Douglas Munro Campbell	Liberal
19th	1934–1937	Douglas Munro Campbell	Liberal
20th	1937–1943	Douglas Munro Campbell	Liberal
21st	1943–1945	Wesley Gardiner Thompson	Progressive Conservative
22nd	1945–1948	Wesley Gardiner Thompson	Progressive Conservative
23rd	1948–1951	Edward B. McMillan	Liberal
24th	1951–1955	Andrew Thomas Ward	Progressive Conservative
25th	1955–1959	Jack Spence	Liberal
26th	1959–1963	Jack Spence	Liberal
27th	1963–1967	Jack Spence	Liberal
Sourced from the Ontario Legislative Assembly
Merged into Kent before the 1967 election

== Election results ==
=== Kent East (1875–1967) ===
1963 Ontario general election
Party	Candidate	Votes	%	±%
Liberal	Jack Spence	7,365	55.49	–0.65
Progressive Conservative	Ernest Depencier	5,907	44.51	+0.65
Total valid votes		13,272	98.90	
Total rejected ballots		147	1.10	–0.04
Turnout		13,419	75.51	–1.93
Eligible voters		17,770		
Liberal hold		Swing		–0.65
Source: Elections Ontario

1959 Ontario general election
Party	Candidate	Votes	%	±%
Liberal	Jack Spence	7,352	56.14	+3.38
Progressive Conservative	Philip W. Schleihauf	5,744	43.86	–3.38
Total valid votes		13,096	98.86	
Total rejected ballots		151	1.14	–0.14
Turnout		13,247	77.45	–0.54
Eligible voters		17,104		
Liberal hold		Swing		+3.38
Source: Elections Ontario

1955 Ontario general election
Party	Candidate	Votes	%	±%
Liberal	Jack Spence	6,940	52.76	+9.51
Progressive Conservative	Andrew Thomas Ward	6,215	47.24	–9.51
Total valid votes		13,155	98.72	
Total rejected ballots		170	1.28	+0.23
Turnout		13,325	77.99	+5.06
Eligible voters		17,085		
Liberal gain from Progressive Conservative		Swing		+9.51
Source: Elections Ontario

1951 Ontario general election
Party	Candidate	Votes	%	±%
Progressive Conservative	Andrew Thomas Ward	6,891	56.75	+11.81
Liberal	Lloyd S. Coleman	5,251	43.25	–11.81
Total valid votes		12,142	98.96	
Total rejected ballots		128	1.04	+0.40
Turnout		12,270	72.93	–4.25
Eligible voters		16,824		
Progressive Conservative gain from Liberal		Swing		+11.81
Source: Elections Ontario

1948 Ontario general election
Party	Candidate	Votes	%	±%
Liberal	Edward B. McMillan	7,536	55.06	+8.26
Progressive Conservative	Ernest Warwick	6,151	44.94	–8.26
Total valid votes		13,687	99.36	
Total rejected ballots		88	0.64	+0.02
Turnout		13,775	77.18	–0.34
Eligible voters		17,847		
Liberal gain from Progressive Conservative		Swing		+8.26
Source: Elections Ontario

1945 Ontario general election
Party	Candidate	Votes	%	±%
Progressive Conservative	Wesley Gardiner Thompson	7,000	53.20	–5.04
Liberal	Edward B. McMillan	6,159	46.80	+5.04
Total valid votes		13,159	99.38	
Total rejected ballots		82	0.62	–0.13
Turnout		13,241	77.52	+6.74
Eligible voters		17,080		
Progressive Conservative hold		Swing		–5.04
Source: Elections Ontario

1943 Ontario general election
Party	Candidate	Votes	%	±%
Progressive Conservative	Wesley Gardiner Thompson	6,800	58.23	+29.68
Liberal	Douglas Munro Campbell	4,877	41.77	–29.68
Total valid votes		11,677	99.25	
Total rejected ballots		88	0.75	+0.03
Turnout		11,765	70.79	–0.25
Eligible voters		16,620		
Progressive Conservative gain from Liberal–Progressive		Swing		+29.68
Source: Elections Ontario

1937 Ontario general election
Party	Candidate	Votes	%	±%
Liberal–Progressive	Douglas Munro Campbell	8,250	71.45	+6.84
Conservative	John Dufferin Brien	3,297	28.55	–4.79
Total valid votes		11,547	99.28	
Total rejected ballots		84	0.72	+0.08
Turnout		11,631	71.04	–1.86
Eligible voters		16,373		
Liberal–Progressive hold		Swing		+5.82
Source: Elections Ontario

1934 Ontario general election
Party	Candidate	Votes	%	±%
Liberal–Progressive	Douglas Munro Campbell	8,399	64.60	–
Conservative	John Dufferin Brien	4,335	33.34	–
Independent	Ray Hooper King	267	2.05	–
Total valid votes		13,001	99.36	
Total rejected ballots		84	0.64	–
Turnout		13,085	72.89	–
Eligible voters		17,951		
Liberal–Progressive gain from Liberal		Swing		–
Source: Elections Ontario

Ontario provincial by-election, January 3, 1934 Death of Philip James Henry
Party	Candidate	Votes
Conservative	Douglas Munro Campbell	acclaimed
Source: Elections Ontario

1929 Ontario general election
Party	Candidate	Votes	%	±%
Conservative	Philip James Henry	3,157	38.56	+1.07
Liberal	Angus Gilanders	2,722	33.24	+22.40
Progressive	Christopher Gardiner	2,309	28.20	–23.47
Total valid votes		8,188	99.32	
Total rejected ballots		56	0.68	+0.19
Turnout		8,244	69.32	–4.41
Eligible voters		11,892		
Conservative gain from Progressive		Swing		–10.67
Source: Elections Ontario

1926 Ontario general election
Party	Candidate	Votes	%	±%
Progressive	Christopher Gardiner	4,562	51.67	–
Conservative	Philip James Henry	3,310	37.49	–7.76
Liberal	Walter J. Cryderman	957	10.84	–
Total valid votes		8,829	99.52	
Total rejected ballots		43	0.48	+0.05
Turnout		8,872	73.73	+16.08
Eligible voters		12,033		
Progressive gain from United Farmers		Swing		+3.88
Source: Elections Ontario

1923 Ontario general election
Party	Candidate	Votes	%	±%
United Farmers	Manning Doherty	4,024	54.75	–
Conservative	Samuel William Beamish	3,326	45.25	–
Total valid votes		7,350	99.57	
Total rejected ballots		32	0.43	–
Turnout		7,382	57.65	–
Eligible voters		12,804		
United Farmers hold		Swing		+0.00
Source: Elections Ontario

Ontario provincial by-election, February 9, 1920 Resignation of James B. Clark to open seat for Manning Doherty
Party	Candidate	Votes
United Farmers	Manning Doherty	acclaimed
Source: Elections Ontario

1919 Ontario general election
Party	Candidate	Votes	%	±%
United Farmers	James B. Clark	5,374	55.28	–
Conservative	James Nathan Mowbray	4,348	44.72	–1.38
Total valid votes		9,722	96.58	
Total rejected ballots		344	3.42	+2.96
Turnout		10,066	81.83	–0.24
Eligible voters		12,301		
United Farmers gain from Liberal		Swing		+0.69
Source: Elections Ontario

1914 Ontario general election
Party	Candidate	Votes	%	±%
Liberal	Walter Renwick Ferguson	2,566	53.90	+1.64
Conservative	Philip James Henry	2,195	46.10	–1.64
Total valid votes		4,761	99.54	
Total rejected ballots		22	0.46	+0.10
Turnout		4,783	82.07	+11.60
Eligible voters		5,828		
Liberal hold		Swing		+1.64
Source: Elections Ontario

1911 Ontario general election
Party	Candidate	Votes	%	±%
Liberal	Walter Renwick Ferguson	2,452	52.26	+3.08
Conservative	Philip Henry Bowyer	2,240	47.74	–3.08
Total valid votes		4,692	99.64	
Total rejected ballots		17	0.36	–0.10
Turnout		4,709	70.47	–8.07
Eligible voters		6,682		
Liberal gain from Conservative		Swing		+3.08
Source: Elections Ontario

1908 Ontario general election
Party	Candidate	Votes	%	±%
Conservative	Philip Henry Bowyer	2,524	50.83	+0.30
Liberal	Richard Lawrence Gosnell	2,442	49.17	–0.30
Total valid votes		4,966	99.54	
Total rejected ballots		23	0.46	+0.22
Turnout		4,989	78.54	+2.42
Eligible voters		6,352		
Conservative hold		Swing		+0.30
Source: Elections Ontario

1905 Ontario general election
Party	Candidate	Votes	%	±%
Conservative	Philip Henry Bowyer	2,714	50.52	+5.39
Liberal	J. Cochrane	2,658	49.48	–1.33
Total valid votes		5,372	99.76	
Total rejected ballots		13	0.24	–0.62
Turnout		5,385	76.12	+9.51
Eligible voters		7,074		
Conservative gain from Liberal		Swing		+3.36
Source: Elections Ontario

1902 Ontario general election
Party	Candidate	Votes	%	±%
Liberal	John Lee	2,468	50.81	–
Conservative	John Davidson	2,192	45.13	–
Independent	George Johns	197	4.06	–
Total valid votes		4,857	99.14	
Total rejected ballots		42	0.86	–
Turnout		4,899	66.62	–
Eligible voters		7,354		
Liberal hold		Swing		–
Source: Elections Ontario

Ontario provincial by-election, November 4, 1901 Death of Robert Ferguson
Party	Candidate	Votes
Liberal	John Lee	acclaimed
Source: Elections Ontario

1898 Ontario general election
Party	Candidate	Votes	%	±%
Liberal	Robert Ferguson	2,869	55.32	+0.30
Conservative	A. M. Mason	2,317	44.68	–
Total valid votes		5,186	99.52	
Total rejected ballots		25	0.48	+0.09
Turnout		5,211	68.47	+6.85
Eligible voters		7,611		
Liberal hold		Swing		+0.15
Source: Elections Ontario

1894 Ontario general election
Party	Candidate	Votes	%	±%
Liberal	Robert Ferguson	2,365	55.03	–38.40
Liberal-Patrons of Industry	C. Darling	1,933	44.97	–
Total valid votes		4,298	99.61	
Total rejected ballots		17	0.39	+0.39
Turnout		4,315	61.62	–26.85
Eligible voters		7,003		
Liberal hold		Swing		–19.20
Source: Elections Ontario

1890 Ontario general election
Party	Candidate	Votes	%	±%
Liberal	Robert Ferguson	2,347	53.99	–3.22
Liberal	A. Patterson	1,714	39.43	–17.78
Equal Rights	E. E. Parrott	286	6.58	–
Total valid votes		4,347	100.00	
Total rejected ballots		–		
Turnout		4,347	88.46	+30.46
Eligible voters		4,914		
Liberal hold		Swing		+10.50
Source: Elections Ontario

1886 Ontario general election
Party	Candidate	Votes	%	±%
Liberal	Robert Ferguson	2,302	57.21	–
Conservative	T. R. Jackson	1,722	42.79	–
Total valid votes		4,024	99.55	
Total rejected ballots		18	0.45	–
Turnout		4,042	58.00	–
Eligible voters		6,969		
Liberal hold		Swing		–
Source: Elections Ontario

Ontario provincial by-election, June 19, 1885 Death of Daniel McCraney
Party	Candidate	Votes
Liberal	Robert Ferguson	acclaimed
Source: Elections Ontario

1883 Ontario general election
Party	Candidate	Votes	%	±%
Liberal	Daniel McCraney	1,947	52.61	–2.30
Conservative	Mr. Wilson	1,754	47.39	+2.30
Total valid votes		3,701	99.36	
Total rejected ballots		24	0.64	+0.64
Turnout		3,725	63.36	+4.76
Eligible voters		5,879		
Liberal hold		Swing		–2.30
Source: Elections Ontario

1879 Ontario general election
Party	Candidate	Votes	%	±%
Liberal	Daniel McCraney	1,774	54.91	+2.03
Conservative	Mr. Trevice	1,457	45.09	−2.03
Total valid votes		3,231	58.60	
Eligible voters		5,514		
Liberal hold		Swing		+2.03
Source: Elections Ontario

Ontario provincial by-election, September 1875 Resignation of Archibald McKellar
Party	Candidate	Votes	%	±%
Liberal	Daniel McCraney	1,509	52.87	+1.11
Conservative	J.G. Laird	1,345	47.13	−1.11
Total valid votes		2,854		
Liberal hold		Swing		+1.11
Source: History of the Electoral Districts, Legislatures and Ministries of the Province of Ontario

1875 Ontario general election
Party	Candidate	Votes	%
Liberal	Archibald McKellar	1,425	51.76
Conservative	J.G. Laird	1,328	48.24
Turnout		2,753	66.27
Eligible voters		4,154	
Liberal pickup new district.			
Source: Elections Ontario

=== Bothwell (1867–1875) ===
Ontario provincial by-election, January 1872: Bothwell Ministerial by-election
Party	Candidate	Votes
Liberal	Archibald McKellar	Acclaimed
Source: History of the Electoral Districts, Legislatures and Ministries of the Province of Ontario

1871 Ontario general election: Bothwell
Party	Candidate	Votes	%	±%
Liberal	Archibald McKellar	1,304	55.02	+3.57
Conservative	Mr. Kirby	1,066	44.98	–3.57
Total valid votes		2,370	100.00	
Total rejected ballots		–		
Turnout		2,370	72.17	–10.99
Eligible voters		3,284		
Liberal hold		Swing		+3.57
Source: Elections Ontario

1867 Ontario general election: Bothwell
Party	Candidate	Votes	%
Liberal	Archibald McKellar	1,242	51.45
Conservative	Mr. Kirby	1,172	48.55
Total valid votes		2,414	83.16
Eligible voters		2,903	
Liberal pickup new district.			
Source: Elections Ontario
