= WDSS =

WDSS may refer to:

- WDSS-LD, a low-power television station (channel 13, virtual 38) licensed to serve Syracuse, New York, United States
- WPRR (AM), a radio station (1680 AM) licensed to serve Ada, Michigan, United States, which held the call sign WDSS from 2003 to 2008
- Wallaceburg District Secondary School (WDSS), a high school in Wallaceburg, Ontario, Canada.
