= Stef Sanjati =

Canadian YouTuber and streamer (born 1995)

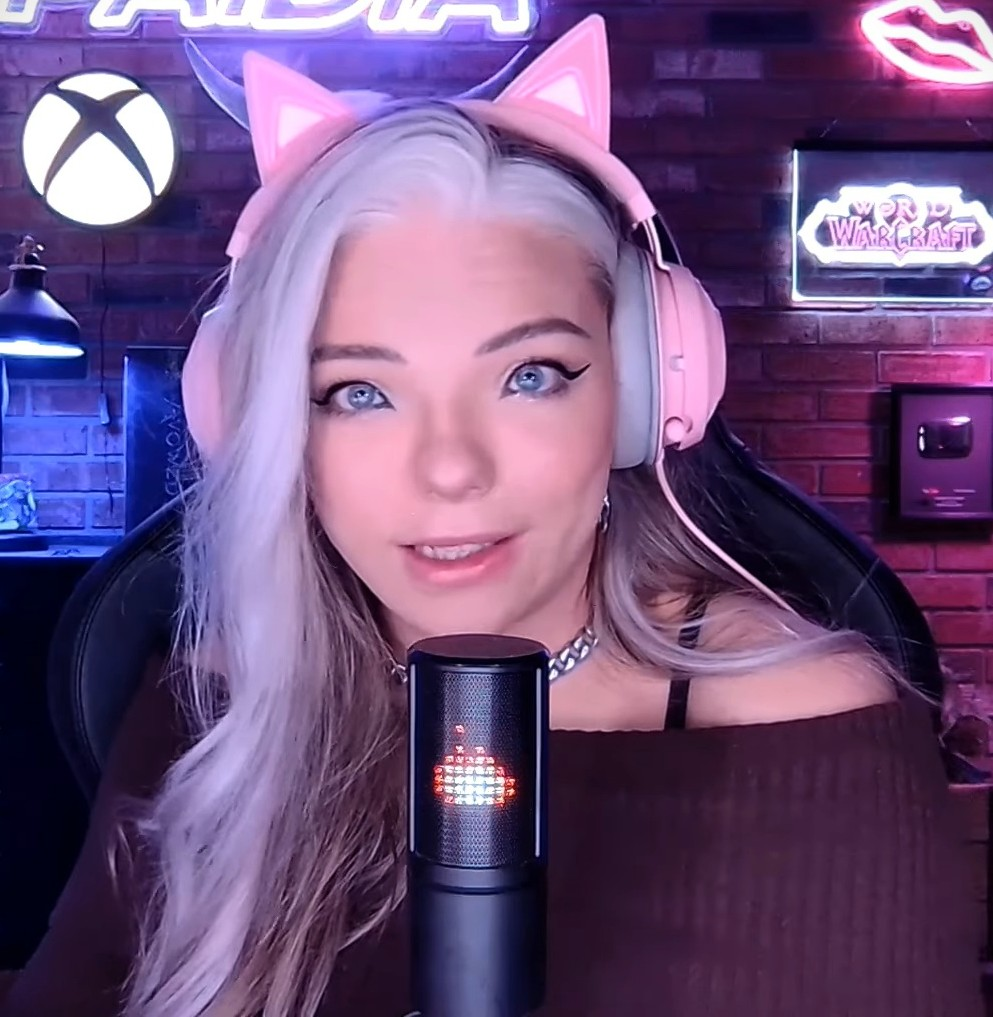
- Sanjati in 2025
- Born: 27 November 1995 (age 30); Wallaceburg, Ontario, Canada
- Other name: Stephanie Luciana Peloza
- Years active: 2014–present
- Known for: Fashion Video Blogger, Waardenburg Syndrome, Transgender activism

Stephanie Luciana Peloza, better known by her stage name Stef Sanjati, is a Canadian video game streamer, video blogger and YouTube personality.

== Life ==
Born Stefan Peloza, Sanjati is of Croatian and Scottish descent.

External videos
- My Face: Waardenburg Syndrome on YouTube – Stef's self-published video on Waardenburg syndrome.

Sanjati has a forelock of white hair and eyes both deeper blue and further apart than typical human anatomy. This is due to a genetic condition known as Waardenburg syndrome. The condition has also left Sanjati deaf in her left ear. In a 2018 interview, Sanjati recounts her experience being bullied and harassed growing up, both for being feminine and for having her rare facial features. She states that she used the Internet and social media as a tool to find her "true self" and express her emotions in a safer environment.

Living near and attending Wallaceburg District Secondary School, due to the bullying, Sanjati was driven to school most days, leading to social anxiety. Originally considering herself gay, she came out as transgender after college.

In December 2016, Sanjati underwent facial feminization surgery. She did not allow her surgeon to alter any of her Waardenburg syndrome features. Sanjati shared the healing process on her YouTube channel.

== Activism ==
Sanjati is known for her educational videos on trans identity, as well as topics such as mental health, relationships and fashion. Sanjati is also known for her make-up tutorials, targeted towards helping other trans women. Sanjati frequently uses YouNow to stream herself applying makeup. Sanjati's YouTube channel has more than 594,000 subscribers, who are collectively known as the "Bread Squad", due to Sanjati's love of bread.

In April 2020, Sanjati retired her YouTube channel. On 25 January 2021, Sanjati posted a video on her YouTube channel announcing she is changing the topic of her content. She said she is retiring from fashion and beauty, but will now do gaming and tech on Twitch and on a new gaming channel.
