= Loyola Catholic Secondary School =

Coordinates: 43.5261°N 79.7129°W

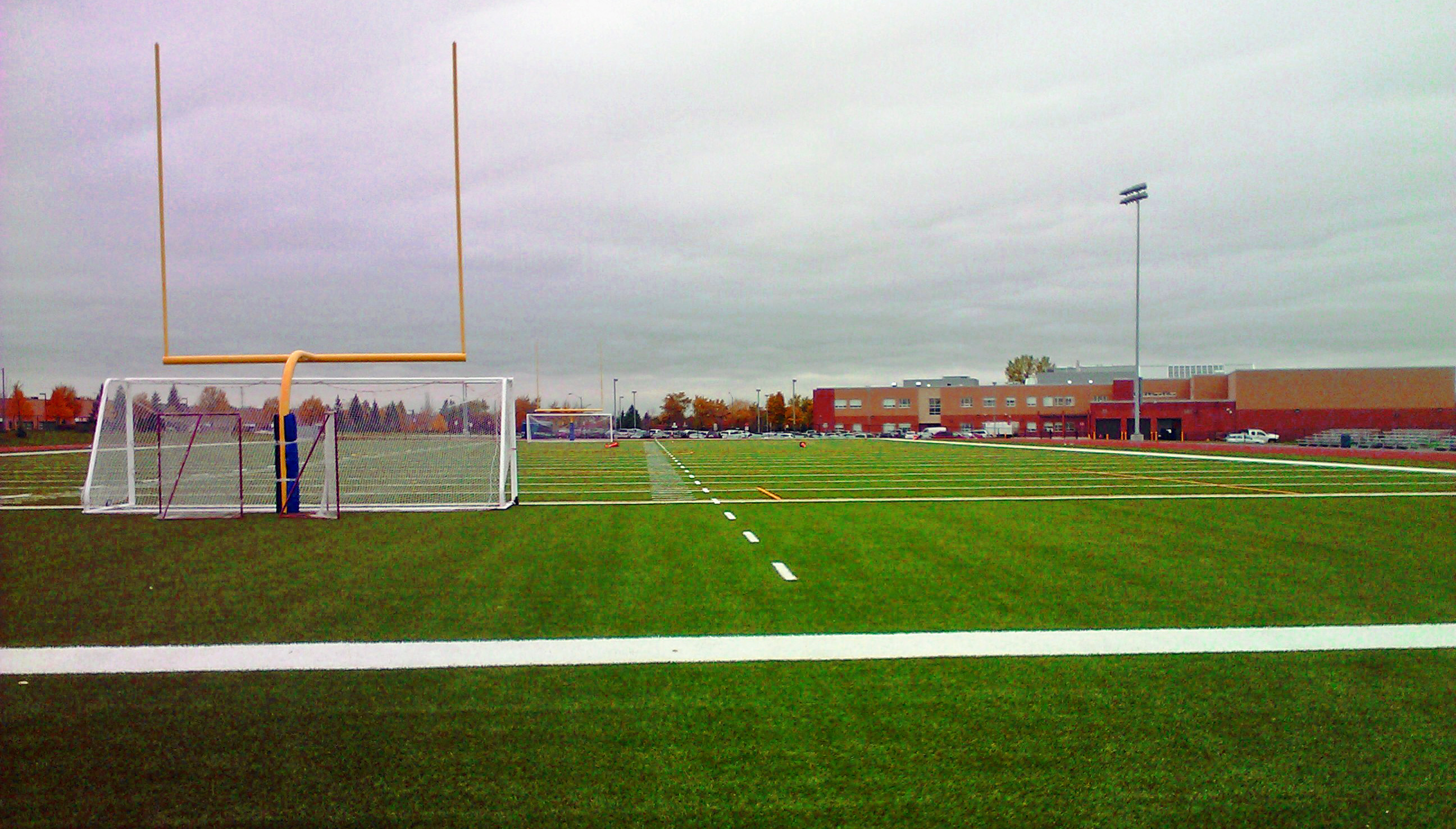

Location
- 4010 Sladeview Crescent (formerly: 3566 South Common Court); Mississauga, Ontario, L5L 6B1; Canada

Information
- School type: Catholic High School
- Motto: Gloria Dei Vita Pleina
- Religious affiliation: Roman Catholic
- Founded: September 1978
- School board: Dufferin-Peel Catholic District School Board
- Superintendent: Cathy Saytar
- Principal: Gina Renda
- Grades: 9 to 12
- Enrolment: approx. 1500 students
- Language: English, programs include French
- Campus: Suburban
- Area: Burnhamthorpe Road West & Ridgeway Drive
- Colours: Burgundy and Gray (former) Navy Blue and White (current)
- Team name: Warriors
- Feeder schools: Christ the King, All Saints, St. Clare, St. Margaret and St. Mark
- Website: www.dpcdsb.org/LOYOL

Loyola Catholic Secondary School is a Roman Catholic high school located in Mississauga, Ontario, Canada. The school has approximately 1500 students, and is operated by the Dufferin-Peel Catholic District School Board.

Every two years, Loyola hosts "Culturefest", a celebration of Canada's diverse cultural make-up that features pavilions, food, and entertainment.

== History ==
Originally, the old building (at South Common Court) was built as a middle school in 1978. It had gone through a series of expansions to accommodate the excess of students in the area; for example, an additional floor level was built. Although upgraded and renovated, it lacked the quality of facilities found in other secondary schools within the region.

In the 2006-2007 year, the school lobbied the Dufferin-Peel Catholic District Schoolboard for a new facility. The new Loyola building was originally approved for construction in 2001. Complete architectural plans for the building were finished, and the project was ready to move underway. However, due to changes in government, the funding for the project was cut, and it was postponed indefinitely. The next time the issue was raised, it was a tie vote that was the result of a strong lobby by parents from Holy Name of Mary SS who did not want to move to the old Loyola campus. The 2006-2007 lobby was an attempt to get this project up and running again, as millions had already been spent on planning the new school, and the Loyola community wished for a facility on par with those enjoyed by other secondary schools. The Board voted against the project in favour of building new elementary schools in the Brampton region.

On April 28, 2009, the trustees of the Dufferin-Peel Catholic District School Board finally decided to give the Loyola Catholic Secondary School community a new and larger school. The plans included the creation of new programs, a full-size gymnasium and ample parking for its 1,300 students with a budget of $49.3 million.

== Relocation ==
After more than 10 years of lobbying the new facility was ready. The school body moved in on Aug 30, 2012. The school now sits on 15 acres (61,000 m^{2}) of land on Burnhamthorpe Rd. and Ridgeway Dr, several blocks west of its previous location. The school now neighbours Oakville, Ontario.

The old facility at South Common Court has now been converted into an education centre named after Canada's first aboriginal Saint, St. Kateri Tekakwitha.

== Notable alumni ==
- Juwan Brescacin (born 1993), professional Canadian football player and Grey Cup champion (2022).
- Marian Coveny (1954–2022), school's physical skills teacher and sports coach (1981–); first captain of the Canada women's national ice hockey team.
- Raheem Edwards (born 1995), professional soccer player for Toronto FC.
- Nik Stauskas (born 1993), professional basketball player formerly of the Sacramento Kings, Philadelphia 76ers, Brooklyn Nets, Portland Trail Blazers, and Cleveland Cavaliers.
- Daniel Winnik (born 1985), hockey player formerly of the Phoenix Coyotes, Toronto Maple Leafs, Washington Capitals, and other National Hockey League teams.

== See also ==
- Education in Ontario
- List of secondary schools in Ontario
