= Marian Coveny =

Canadian ice hockey captain

Mern Coveny
- Born: 24 September 1954; Wallaceburg, Ontario
- Died: 6 January 2022 (aged 67); Orangeville, Ontario
- Occupation: physical education teacher
- Known for: first captain of the Canada women's national ice hockey team (1987)

Marian Louise 'Mern' Coveny (24 September 1954–6 January 2022) was the first captain of the Canada women's national ice hockey team, playing centre and left wing.

Longtime women's Canadian hockey administrator Fran Rider stated 'Coveny's impact at that [1987] tournament and on the history of women's hockey runs deeper than Coveny, the consummate team player, will ever admit'. Coveny's story helped precipitate the 2024 book, Ice in their veins: Women's relentless pursuit of the puck, where it was considered that if she was a man, she would have been entered in the Hockey Hall of Fame, or that her name would be emblazoned on a local arena.

== Early life ==
Coveny was the youngest of ten children to a sporting family in a small farming village near Wallaceburg, south-west Ontario, and first played hockey on a frozen creek near their home. Even at the age of seven, fellow siblings and nephews could not get the puck from her. Once the snow and ice had melted, the front yard then became a baseball diamond.

She attended the Wallaceburg District Secondary School, when she first commenced playing organised hockey. After completing a bachelor of physical education at McMaster University, Coveny taught physical education and geography at Saint Ignatius Loyola high school, Mississauga from 1981. As well as coaching badminton, hockey, and softball, in 2008 she took the junior boys' volleyball team to a championship.

== Athletic career ==
Whilst fastball and softball were available to women and girls, and she played both, ice hockey was not. Her first team was with the Wallaceburg Hornettes. That team was to become part of the first women's ice hockey tournament in Ontario in 1967, becoming the Lipstick Tournament and anointed the North American Women's Hockey Tournament.

Coveny went onto play Ontario Women's Interuniversity Athletic Association (OWIAA) hockey for McMaster University's Marauders, taking them to the Ontario championships in 1976 and 1978. While at the university she was a founding member of the Hamilton Golden Hawks (1977), before graduating as a physical education teacher.

During the 1980s, part of the provincial championships team, she would win the 'A' division title multiple times, including most valuable player in 1981. The Golden Hawks took out the Lipstick Tournaments in 1984 and 1985, with silver and bronze at national championships in the same years, and taking out their first national title in 1986 and the Abby Hoffman Cup.

Women's ice hockey was still considered lesser to the men's competition in the 1980s; during one Golden Hawks game Coveny had to order the zamboni driver off the ice, who had come during the third period due to the late finish of the earlier men's game.

Despite International Ice Hockey Federation objections, in 1987 the first Women’s World Hockey Tournament was held; with long-term captain Coveny setting the goal to have the team win the national championships and go onto the world event. At the championships in Riverview, New Brunswick, Hamilton took Edmonton Chimos 3–2 in overtime, became 'Team Canada', and with it, Coveny became the first captain. The 1987 non-sanctioned world tournament was held in Toronto with six countries (Canada, Japan, Nederlands, Sweden, Switzerland, and the United States) and an extra Ontario team. Canada's first goal by Coveny, player #3, set up the 10–0 win against Switzerland. Along with Geraldine Heaney and Angela James, the team winning gold at the tournament outright undefeated.

== Later years ==
Later on Coveny was still involved as an athlete, winning three Canadian Ball Hockey Championships, and as a 65-year-old in 2020, advancing onto the age national championships before it was cancelled by the COVID-19 pandemic in Canada.

A serious competitor, her proudest achievement was representing and captaining Canada at the first Women's World Hockey Tournament. Covery was considered a legend and 'one of the most influential hockey players to wear the Maple Leaf representing Canada'.

Coveny died of pancreatic cancer in January 2022, after a diagnosis in September 2020. She died leaving a wife.

== Honours ==
- Wallaceburg Sports Hall of Fame, 1995.
- McMaster Athletics Hall of Fame, 2002.
- The Mern Coveny Memorial Tournament, an annual tournament held in Oakville, Ontario. First held in 2022, to help support girls and women in hockey who need financial assistance with sport registrations fees and equipment costs.
