= Nik Stauskas =

Canadian basketball player (born 1993)

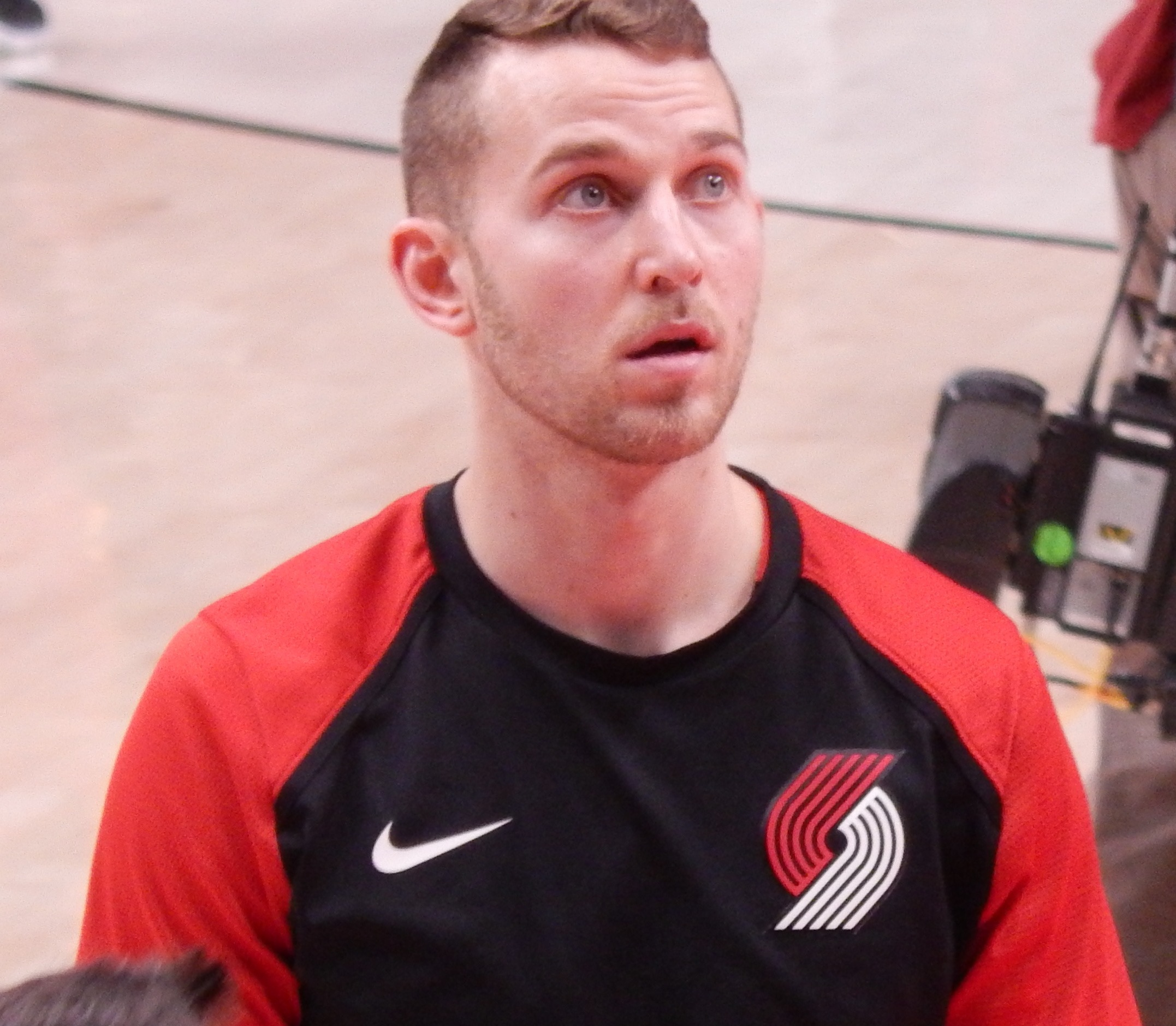
- Stauskas with the Portland Trail Blazers in 2019

Personal information
- Born: October 7, 1993 (age 33) Mississauga, Ontario, Canada
- Listed height: 6 ft 6 in (1.98 m)
- Listed weight: 207 lb (94 kg)

Career information
- High school: Loyola Catholic (Mississauga, Ontario); South Kent School (South Kent, Connecticut); St. Mark's (Southborough, Massachusetts)
- College: Michigan (2012–2014)
- NBA draft: 2014: 1st round, 8th overall pick
- Drafted by: Sacramento Kings
- Playing career: 2014–2022
- Position: Shooting guard
- Number: 10, 11, 2, 6, 1, 9, 13

Career history
- 2014–2015: Sacramento Kings
- 2015–2017: Philadelphia 76ers
- 2017–2018: Brooklyn Nets
- 2018–2019: Portland Trail Blazers
- 2019: Cleveland Cavaliers
- 2019–2020: Baskonia
- 2021: Raptors 905
- 2021: Grand Rapids Gold
- 2021–2022: Miami Heat
- 2022: Grand Rapids Gold
- 2022: Boston Celtics
- 2022: →Maine Celtics

Career highlights
- Consensus second-team All-American (2014); Big Ten Player of the Year (2014); First-team All-Big Ten (2014)
- Stats at NBA.com
- Stats at Basketball Reference
Medals
Men's basketball
Representing Canada
FIBA AmeriCup
Bronze medal – third place	2015 Mexico City	National team
FIBA Americas U16 Championship
Bronze medal – third place	2009 Mendoza	National team

Nikolas Tomas Stauskas (born October 7, 1993) is a Canadian former professional basketball player who played six seasons in the National Basketball Association (NBA). A shooting guard, Stauskas played two seasons of college basketball for the Michigan Wolverines from 2012 to 2014. He was drafted eighth overall in the 2014 NBA draft by the Sacramento Kings. Stauskas, whose family is of Lithuanian heritage, is a member of the Canadian national team.

As a freshman for the 2012–13 Michigan Wolverines, Stauskas was named Sports Illustrated National Freshman of the Week once, Big Ten Conference Freshman of the Week three times and to the Wayman Tisdale Award, United States Basketball Writers Association's National Freshman of the Year, top 12 midseason list. During the 2013 NCAA Men's Division I Basketball Tournament, he earned South All-Regional Team recognition. As a sophomore for the 2013–14 team, Stauskas went on to be named a 2014 NCAA Men's Basketball consensus All-American and was named Big Ten Conference Men's Basketball Player of the Year for the 2013–14 Big Ten Conference men's basketball season.

Stauskas has played for several NBA and NBA G League teams. In 2022, he reached the NBA Finals with the Celtics.

== Early life ==
Stauskas grew up in Mississauga, Ontario. His first experience with basketball came as a member of the Aušra Sports Club, which is a Toronto-based traveling team for children of Lithuanian descent. He became so devoted to basketball that his head coach at Michigan, John Beilein, said in 2013,

He doesn't know anything about hockey, he doesn't know anything about football. The other day we had him try to throw a baseball pass as a press breaker. And he had never thrown a baseball.

== High school career ==
Until 2009, Stauskas played for Loyola Catholic Secondary School. He averaged 15 points, 5 rebounds and 5 assists in 2007–08 and 32 points, 14 rebounds and 7.5 assists in 2008–09. Stauskas also joined the premier Amateur Athletic Union (AAU) team in Toronto, run by Ro Russell. Some of Russell's prior players, such as Tristan Thompson and Cory Joseph had gone to the United States to complete their scholastic years. Stauskas spent the 2009–10 academic year at South Kent School, but he transferred to St. Mark's School the following year. He missed the 2009–10 basketball season as a result of a hip injury. Michigan Wolverines men's basketball head coach John Beilein became familiar with Stauskas during the Summer 2010 NBA camp prior to Stauskas's junior year. He visited Michigan that summer and was also being recruited by Villanova, Iowa State, Georgetown, Notre Dame, Florida and Providence. By the time he arrived at St. Mark's, he was expected to be an All-State performer. In the 2011 NEPSAC Class AA Championship game, Stauskas led St. Mark's in scoring with 17 points against Nerlens Noel and the Tilton School, but St. Marks lost 72–56. On March 26, 2011, Stauskas made a verbal commitment to Michigan. This commitment made him the second member of Michigan's recruiting class of 2012. That summer, he scored 27 points in an exhibition of Canadian high school all-stars against the Baylor Bears men's basketball team.

Prior to his senior year, ESPN named him as one of the top 25 three-point shooters in the national class of 2012. At the time of their November 2011 National Letter of Intent signings, Stauskas, Glenn Robinson III and Mitch McGary gave Michigan a consensus top 10 entering class for its 2012 class. Stauskas led St. Mark's to 67–57 victory in a 2012 Hoophall Classic contest with 16 points against Friends Central. As the season progressed, Stauskas (and Robinson) improved in the national player ratings to offset McGary's slide and maintain a top-rated class. He scored 19 to lead his school to a 59–53 2012 NEPSAC Class AA Championship game victory over Noel's Tilton. Stauskas earned the NEPSAC championship game MVP. He was selected to the 2012 All-NEPSAC Class AA first team (along with teammate Kaleb Tarczewski). Following these honors, Stauskas's stock and rankings continued to rise.

College recruiting
Name	Hometown	School	Height	Weight	Commit date
Nik Stauskas; SF/SG	Mississauga, Ontario	Loyola Catholic (ON); South Kent (CT); St. Mark's (MA)	6 ft 6 in (1.98 m)	205 lb (93 kg)	Apr 7, 2014
Nik Stauskas; SF/SG	Recruit ratings: Scout: Rivals: (92)				
Overall recruit ranking: Scout: 18 (SF) Rivals: 71, 13 (SG) ESPN: 76, 21 (SF), 2 (CAN)
Note: In many cases, Scout, Rivals, 247Sports, On3, and ESPN may conflict in their listings of height and weight.; In these cases, the average was taken. ESPN grades are on a 100-point scale.; Sources: "Michigan 2012 Basketball Commitments". Rivals.; "2012 Michigan Basketball Commits". Scout.; "ESPN". ESPN.; "Scout.com Team Recruiting Rankings". Scout.; "2012 Team Ranking". Rivals.

== College career ==
The 2011–12 Michigan Wolverines men's basketball team had been co-champions of 2011–12 Big Ten Conference, but lost both of its co-captains, Zack Novak and Stu Douglass, to graduation and three players as transfers. The team was returning a nucleus of All-Big Ten players Trey Burke and Tim Hardaway Jr.

=== Freshman season ===
External videos
- Stauskas 45 for 50 three point exhibition posted on Christmas Eve 2012
- Stauskas 70 for 76 three point exhibition posted first day home after freshman year.

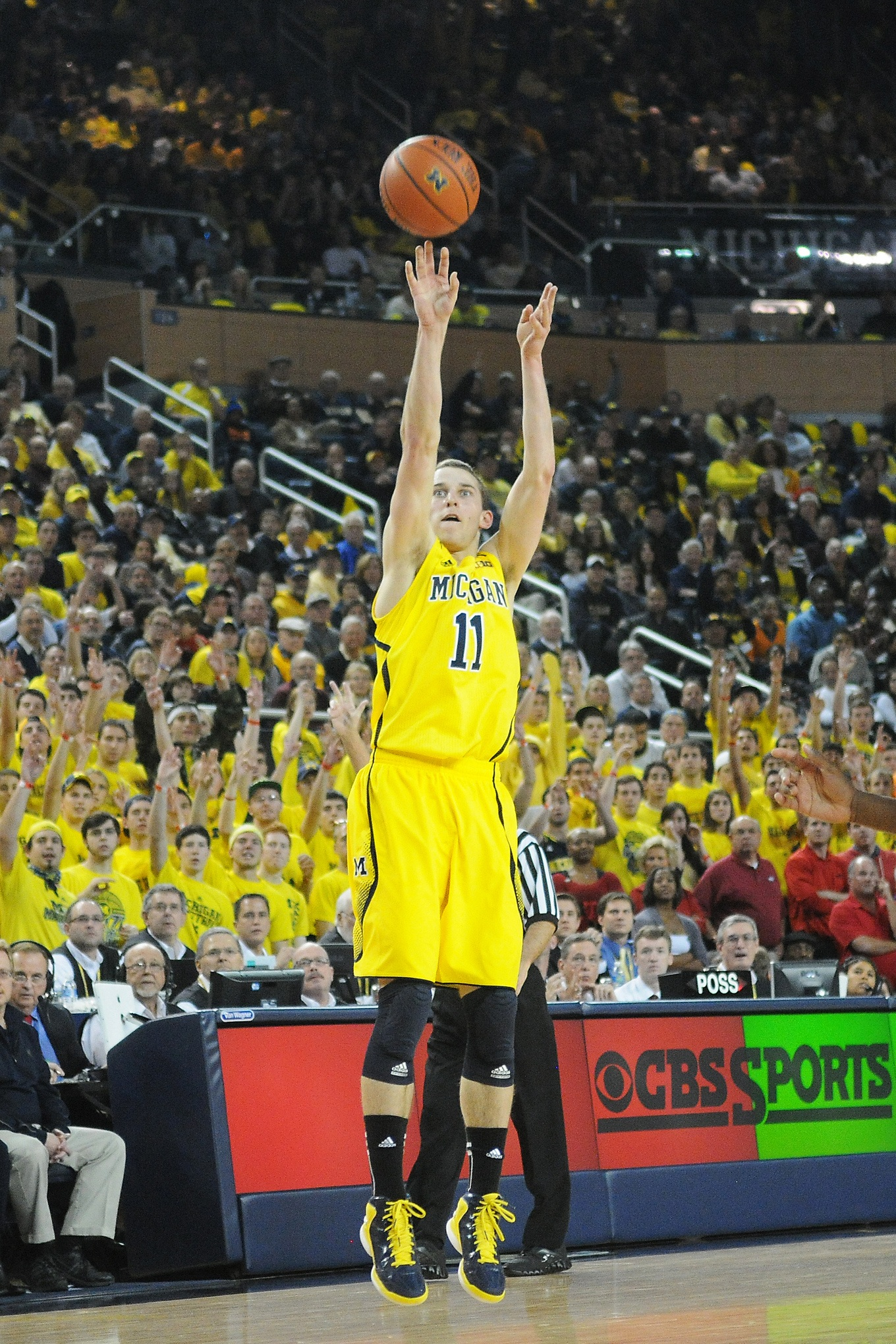
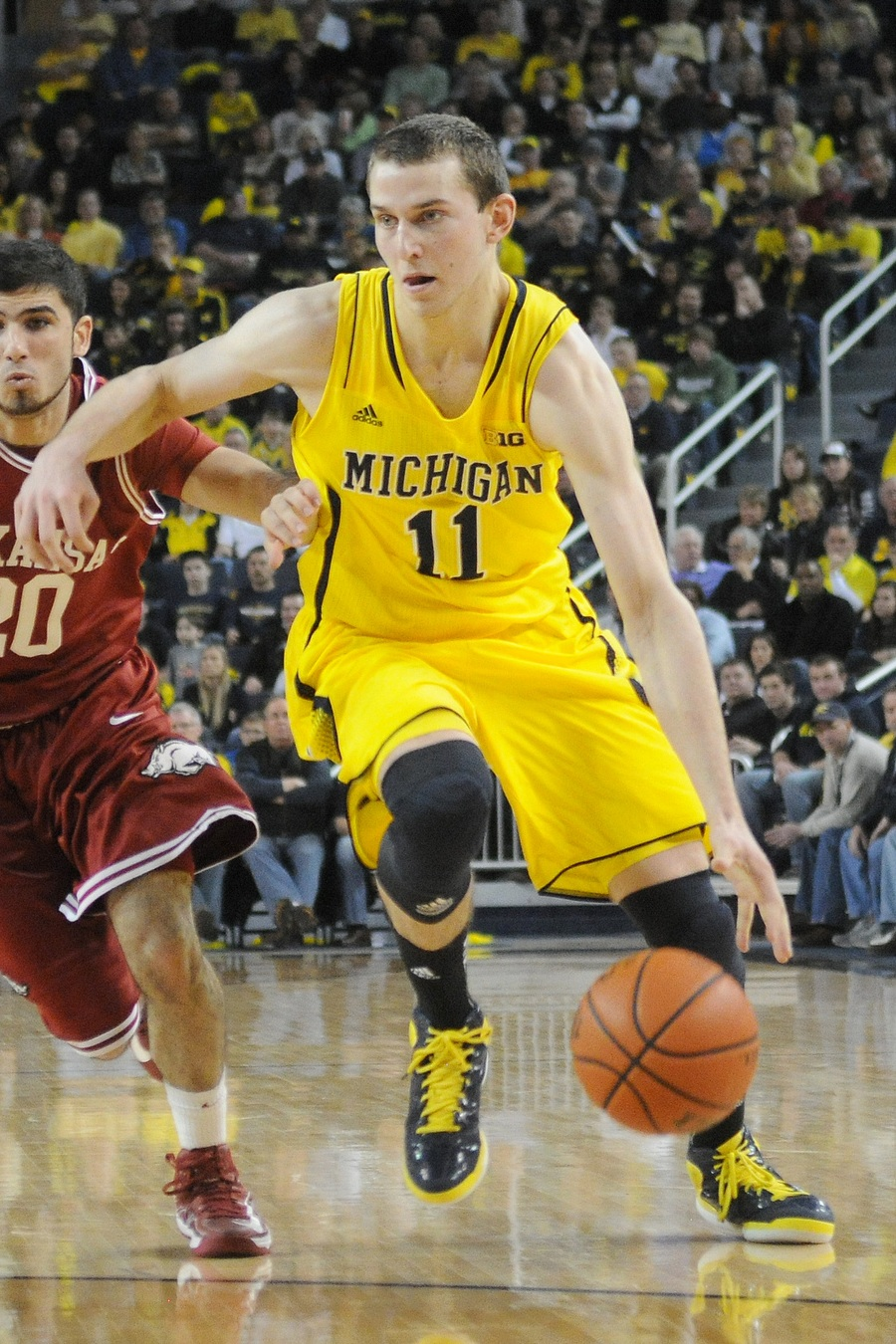
Stauskas in action in (2012-12-08)

Stauskas began his college career with the expectation that he would be a sharpshooter based on his performance in three-point field goal drills in which he had raised the bar for the team. In the championship rounds of the 2012 NIT Season Tip-Off tournament at Madison Square Garden on November 21 and 23, Michigan defeated Pittsburgh and Kansas State, respectively, to win the tournament. On November 26, Stauskas earned Big Ten Freshman of the Week honors for his NIT tournament performance in which he averaged 12.5 points and 4.5 rebounds. On November 27, Michigan defeated its first ranked opponent of the season, NC State (#18 AP Poll/#18 Coaches' Poll), in the ACC–Big Ten Challenge with a then-career-high 20 points from Stauskas in a 79–72 victory. On December 1 against Bradley, Stauskas made his first career regular season start and posted a new career-high 22 points. For his first two 20 point performances, he repeated as Big Ten Freshman of the Week on December 3. On December 29, against Central Michigan, Stauskas posted 19 points on 5-for-8 three-point shooting. His 5 three-pointers and 7 rebounds were career-highs, earning him his third Big Ten Freshman of the Week on December 31.

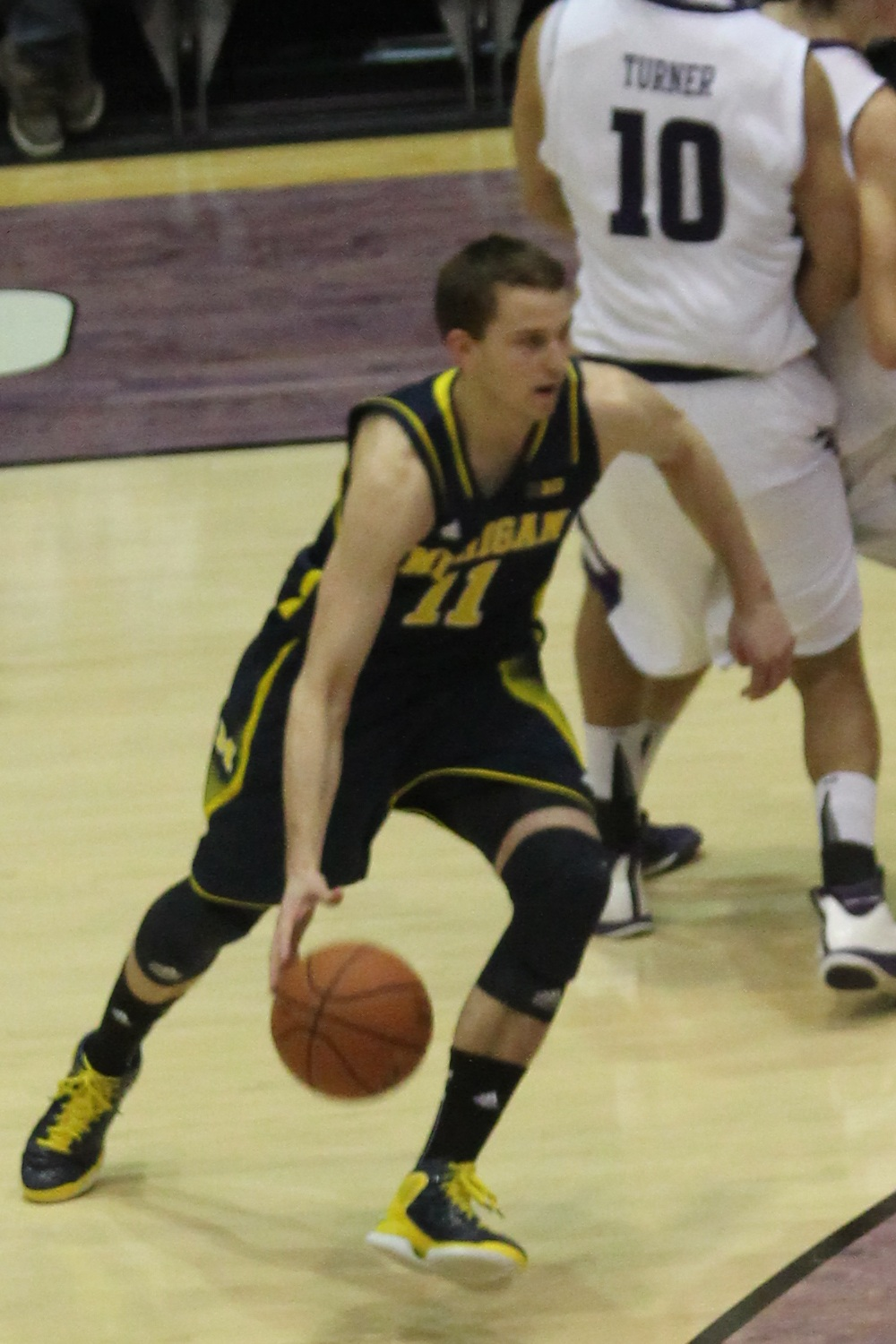
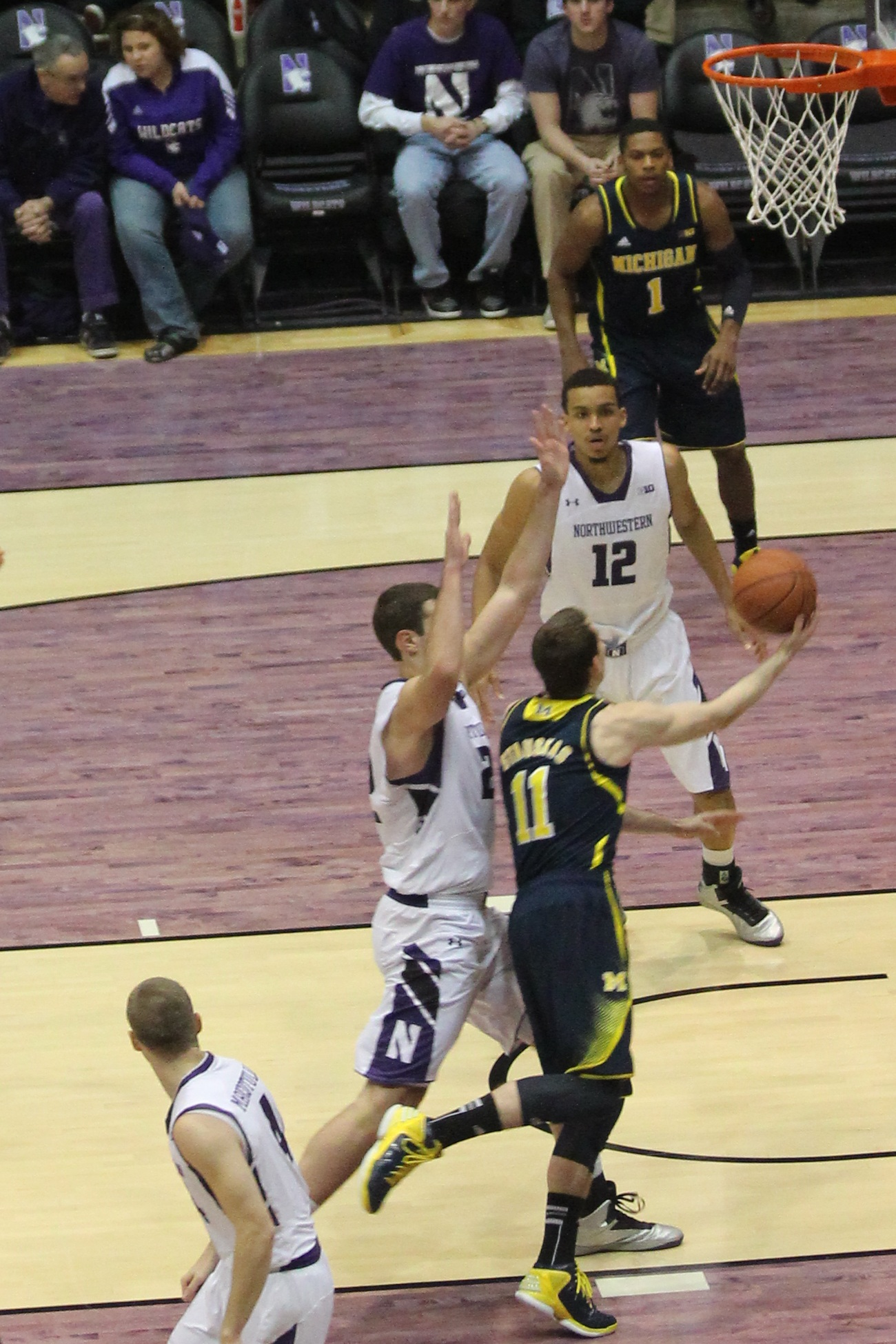
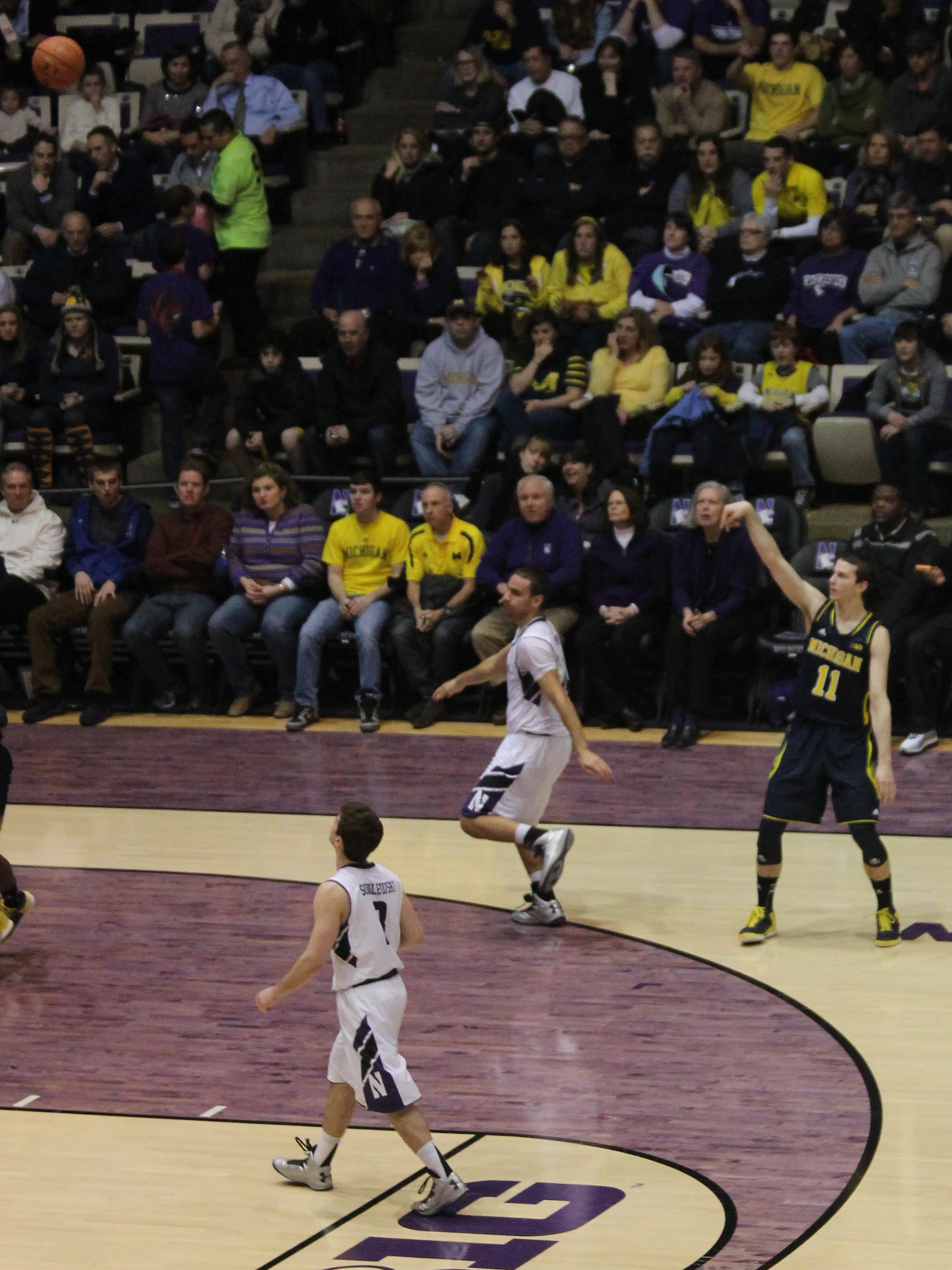
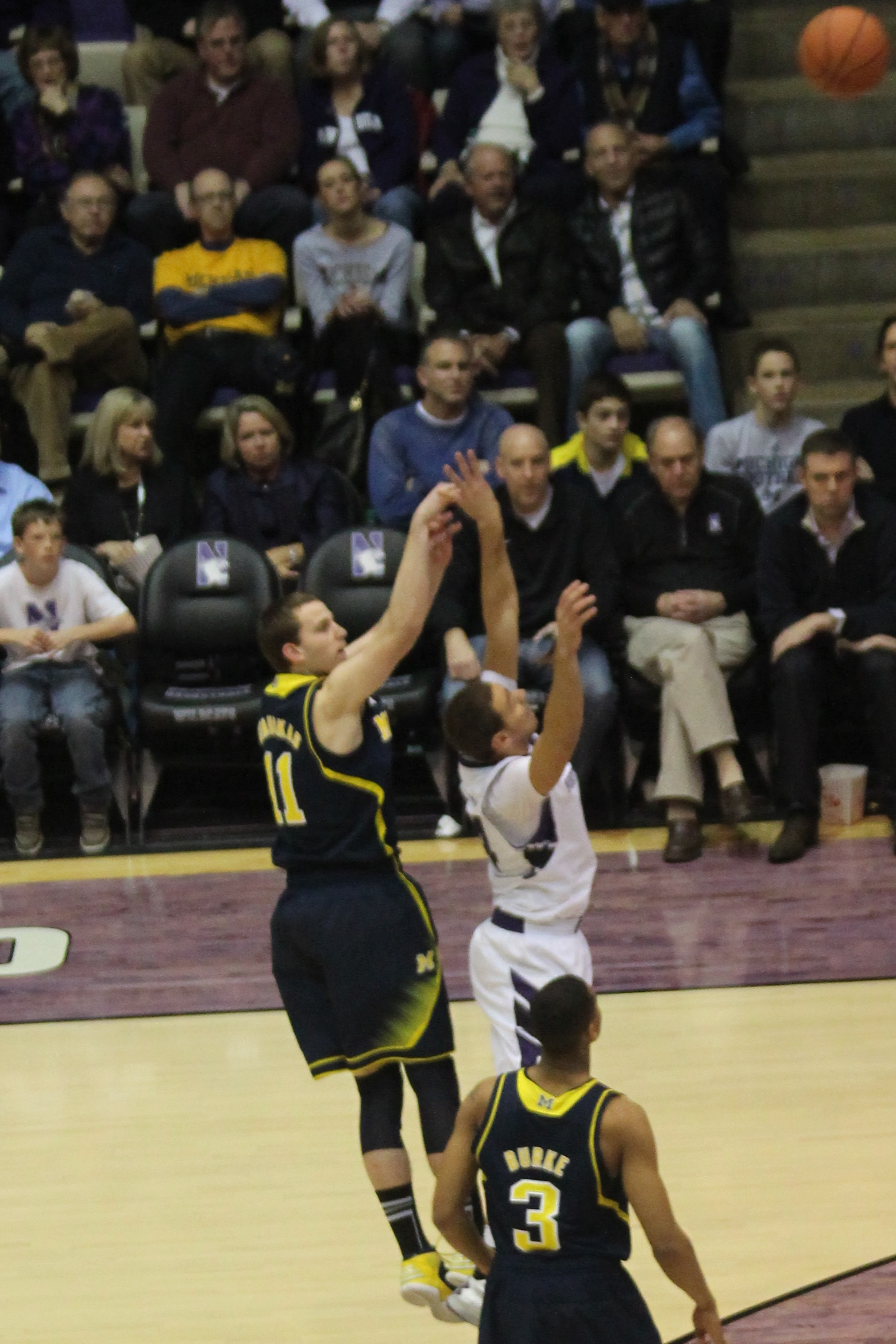
Stauskas in action in the 2012–13 Big Ten Conference men's basketball season opener on January 3 against Northwestern: left—slashing, left center—a layup, right center—follow through on a three-point field goal, right— a jump shot

Entering the day of December 31, Stauskas led the nation in three-point field goal percentage. On January 16, 2013, Sporting News named Stauskas the surprise player of the first half of the year. As late as January 28, Stauskas was leading the Big Ten in free throw shooting percentage (.833) as well as three-pointers made and was second in 3-point shooting percentage (.490). On that day, Michigan was ranked number one in the AP Poll with 51 of the 65 first place votes. It marked the first time Michigan ranked atop the AP Poll since the Fab Five 1992–93 team did so on December 5, 1992. On January 31, Stauskas and Robinson were named to the Wayman Tisdale Award (USBWA National Freshman of the Year) top 12 midseason list, recognizing their performances as being among the 12 best freshman performances in the NCAA competition. Stauskas finished the 18-game 2012–13 Big Ten Conference men's basketball season schedule with a 37% three-point percentage on 30-for-81 shooting during conference play.

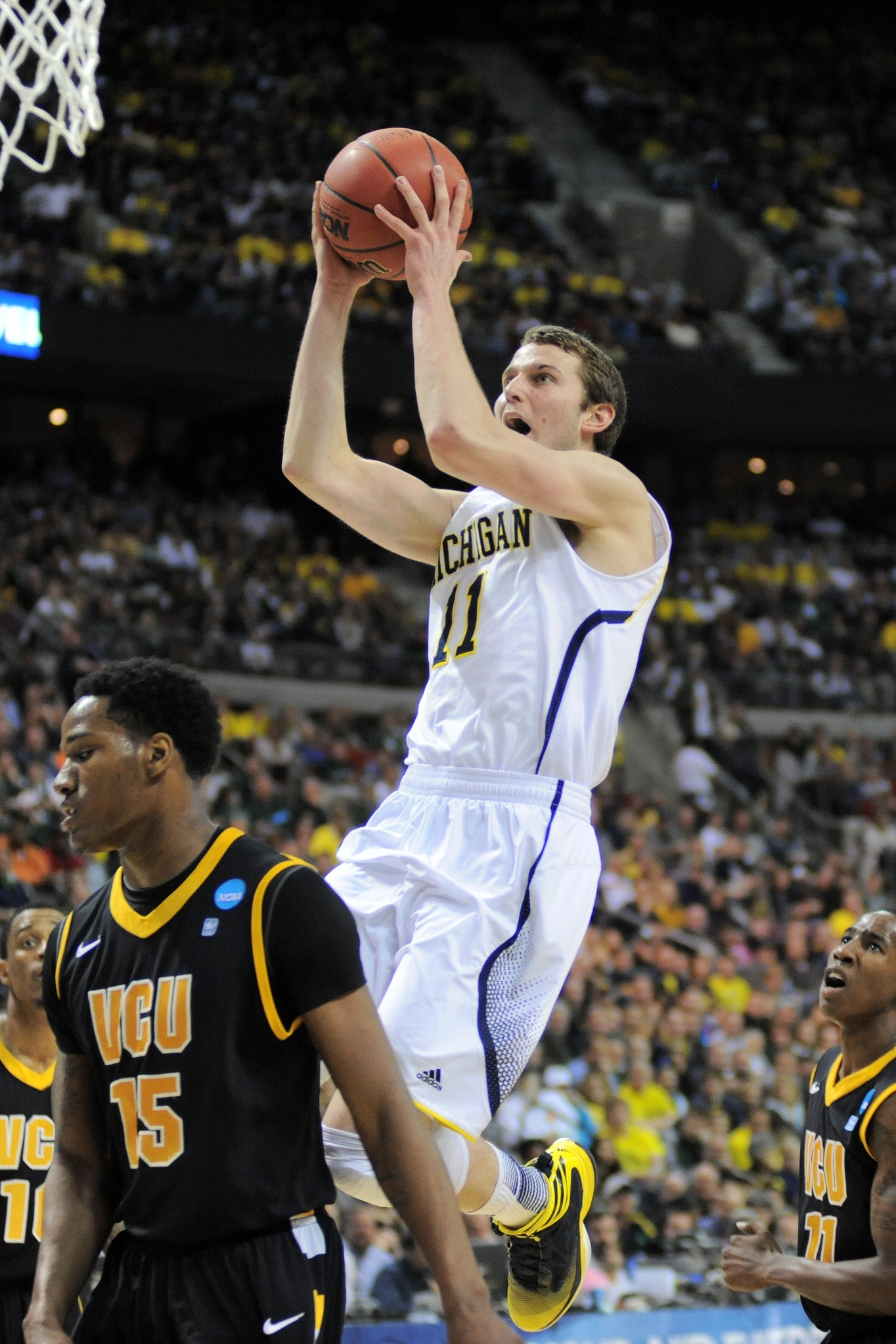
Stauskas in the 2013 NCAA Men's Division I Basketball Tournament

Having made his last 20 consecutive free throws entering the 2013 NCAA Men's Division I Basketball Tournament Sweet Sixteen, Stauskas ended the season with an 85.1% (74–87) free throw shooting percentage, which was better than the Big Ten Conference free throw shooting percentage leader, Adreian Payne (84.8%). In the regional finals on March 31 against Florida, Stauskas made all 6 of his three-point shot attempts, including all 5 in the first half as the team built a 41–17 lead before going into the half up 47–30. This marked the best NCAA Tournament single-game three-point shooting percentage in school history (min 5 attempts) since no other Wolverine has shot 100% with at least 5 attempts. Michigan advanced to the April 8 national championship game where the team lost to Louisville by an 82–76 margin. His 6 three-point shots was a new career best and his 22-point performance tied his career high. All his three-point shots came from the left corner. The 6 three-point shots pushed Stauskas to a Michigan freshman-season record total of 80, surpassing Tim Hardaway Jr.'s two-year-old record of 76. Six 3 point shots made without a miss was one shy of a conference record shared by Wolverine Glen Rice and 3 others (including David Lighty's 2011 NCAA Tournament performance). Stauskas joined McGary and Most Outstanding Player Trey Burke on the South All-Regional team. For the season, his .9 fouls per 40 minutes was second in the country.

=== Sophomore season ===
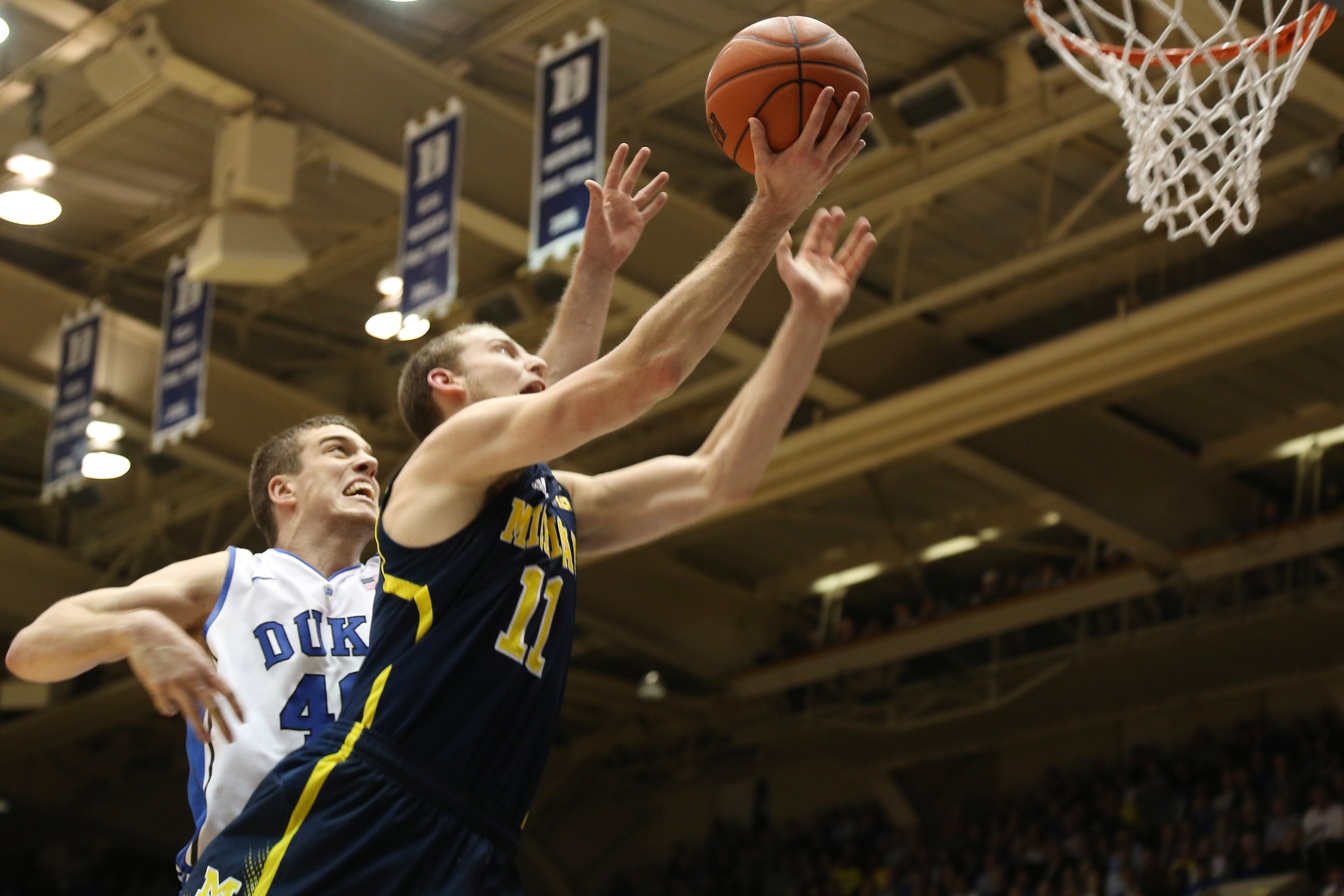
Stauskas drives against Marshall Plumlee.

In the offseason, Stauskas added 16 pounds (7.3 kg) to his frame and 6 inches (15.2 cm) to his vertical jump. On November 12, Stauskas posted career highs of 23 points and 5 assists in the second game of the regular season against South Carolina State. In the next game, Stauskas contributed a career-high 6 assists as well as 20 points against Iowa State on November 17. Stauskas scored a game-high 24 points on November 21 against Long Beach State in the first round of the Puerto Rico Tip-Off, surpassing his career high set two games before and giving him three consecutive 20-point performances for the first time in his career. Stauskas established another career high the next day against Florida State as he scored 26 points including 7 of the team's 13 points in overtime, despite scoring only 3 points in the first half. In the game, he set a career high with 9 made free throws and logged his fourth consecutive 20 point game. Following a Michigan timeout with 11 seconds in regulation, Stauskas made a layup to force overtime. In the championship game against Charlotte, Stauskas tallied 20 points and a career-high 3 steals. Although Michigan lost in the championship game, Stauskas earned tournament MVP honors. In the second half Stauskas twisted his ankle, but continued to play the final 9½ minutes. Stauskas sat out the November 29 game against Coppin State to rest his ankle.

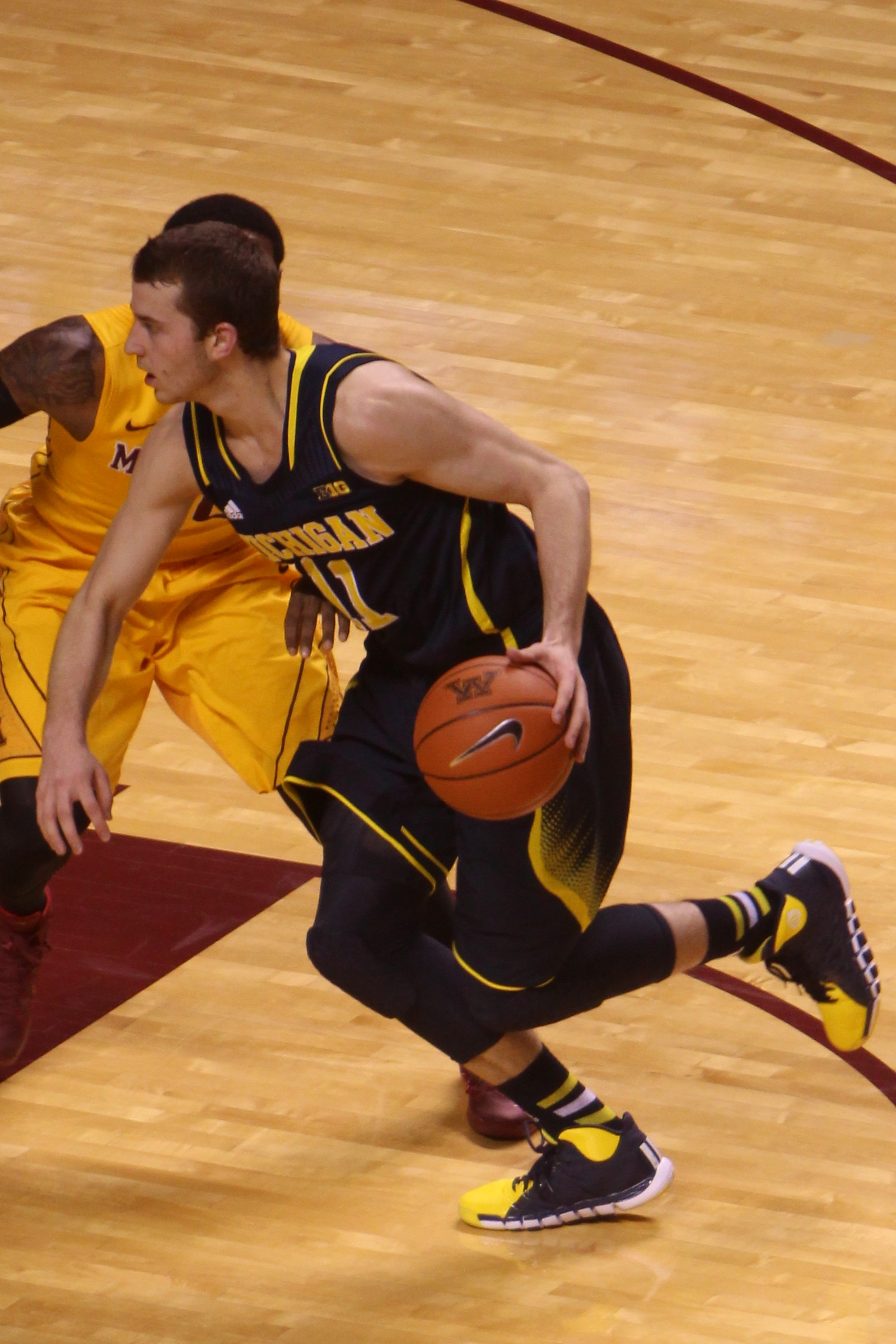
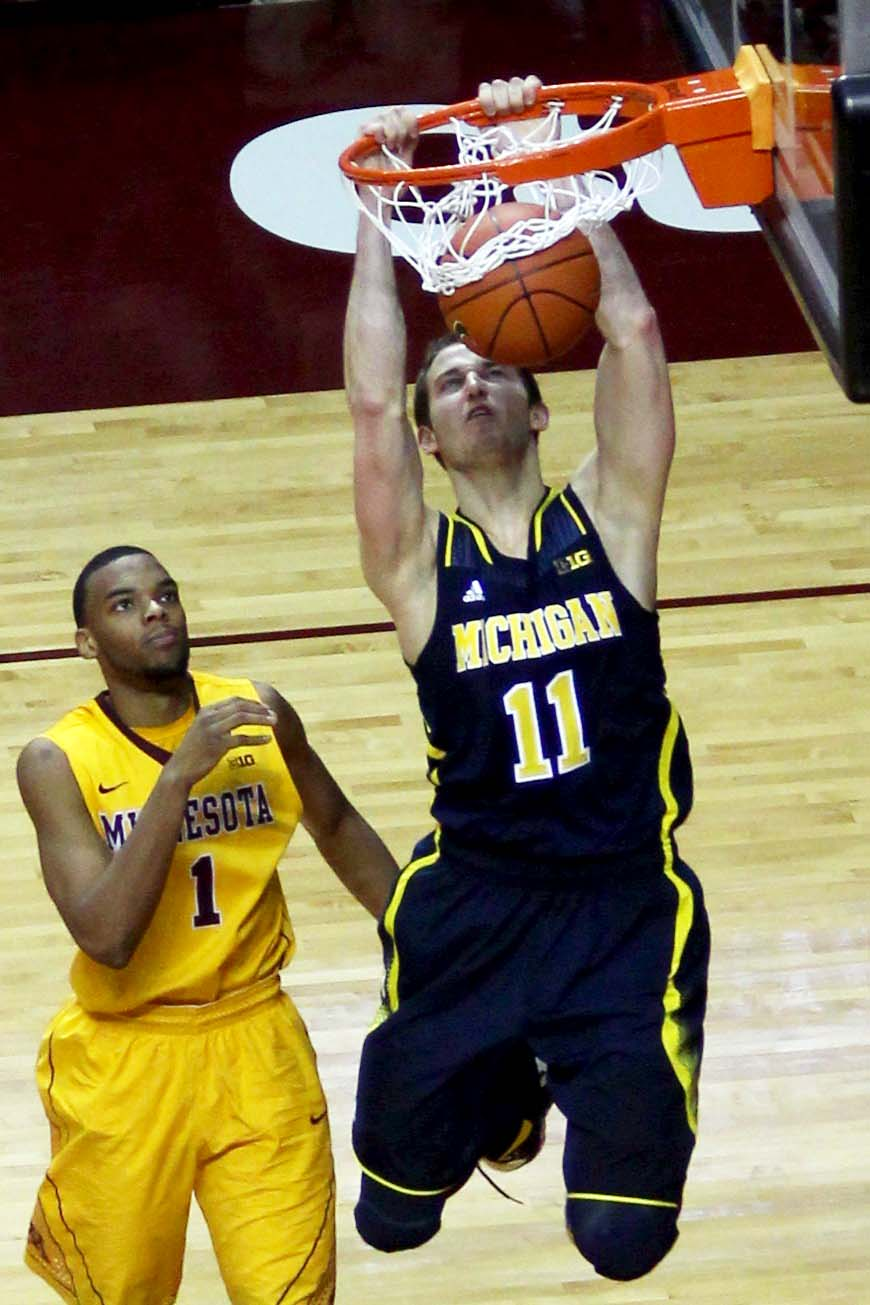
Stauskas in the Michigan–Minnesota 2013–14 Big Ten season opener

In the January 2 Big Ten Conference opener against Minnesota, Stauskas set a career high with 7 assists while scoring 14 points. On January 14, he had a game-high 21 points, team-high 5 assists as well as 6 rebounds against Penn State. On January 18, Stauskas scored 23 points including the final 11 for Michigan as the team defeated (#3) Wisconsin at the Kohl Center for the first time since the 1998–99 team did so, ending an 11-game losing streak at Wisconsin. On January 21, Stauskas earned his first Big Ten Conference Player of the Week recognition. At the time he was leading the conference in scoring and 20-point games. On January 22, against (#10) Iowa Stauskas tied his career high with 26 points and contributed 5 rebounds and 5 assists, helping Michigan defeat consecutive top 10 opponents for the first time since the 1996–97 team. On January 25 in the Michigan–Michigan rivalry game against the 2013–14 Spartans, Stauskas contributed 19 points and 4 assists, including a 5-for-6 effort on three-point shots. The 80–75 victory over (#3) Michigan State marked the first time in school history that the team defeated three consecutive AP Poll top ten opponents and marked the first time since the 1986–87 Iowa Hawkeyes that any team has won three consecutive games all of which were against top 10 opponents. It also gave Michigan a 7–0 Big Ten start, which is the best since the 1976–77 team won its first eight games. His effort for the week earned a second Big Ten Player of the Week recognition on January 27. Stauskas also earned Oscar Robertson National Player of the Week recognition from United States Basketball Writers Association on January 28. He led the conference in scoring and three-point shooting percentage through January, but he only scored six points when Michigan got upset by Indiana on February 2, ending a 10-game winning streak and 8–0 Big Ten conference start. Stuaskas established another career high in assists with 8 against Nebraska on February 5 as the team posted its largest conference game margin of victory since defeating Indiana 112–64 on February 22, 1998. On February 23 against (#13/14) Michigan State, Michigan rebounded from an early 22–11 deficit to win 79–70. Stauskas led the way with 25 points on 9-for-13 shooting and with 21 coming in the second half, including 10 that took the score from a 48–43 deficit to a 53–51 lead. It marked his first game with 9 made field goals. He added 5 assists, 3 rebounds and no fouls on his way to earning his third Big Ten Player of the Week recognition on February 24. On March 4, Stauskas had 24 points, including a career-high seven three-point shots, as part of a 7-for-9 three-point effort against Illinois to help Michigan clinch its 14th and eighth outright Big Ten Conference championship. On March 8, Stauskas had a team-high 21 points to help Michigan close out its season with a season-ending 84–80 victory over Indiana. On March 10 Stauskas earned his fourth Big Ten Player of the week award (this time Co-POTW with Shavon Shields). Stauskas's four Player of the Week awards led the Big Ten for the season. Four B1G Player of the Week awards is a Michigan single-season record. At the end of the regular season, he was the only player in the Big Ten to rank among the top 10 for field goal percentage (48.9), three-point percentage (45.8) and free throw percentage (81.1).

On March 22 against Texas in Michigan's second game of the 2014 NCAA Men's Division I Basketball Tournament, Stauskas had a career-high-tying 8 assists as well as a team-high 17 points. The 2013–14 team was eliminated in the elite eight round of the 2014 NCAA Men's Division I Basketball Tournament by Kentucky as Stauskas led all scorers with 24 points. Stauskas and teammate Caris LeVert joined Julius Randle, Aaron Harrison and Marcus Lee on the All-Midwest Regional team.

On April 15, in a joint press conference with Robinson on the Big Ten Network, Stauskas declared for the 2014 NBA draft. During his two years with Michigan, the school enjoyed its winningest two-year stretch in school history marked by a total of 59 wins. Of Michigan's prior 14 early NBA draft entrants, 10 were selected in the first round and 3 in the second. Stauskas did sign with Bartelstein (along with teammate McGary).

==== Watchlists and awards ====
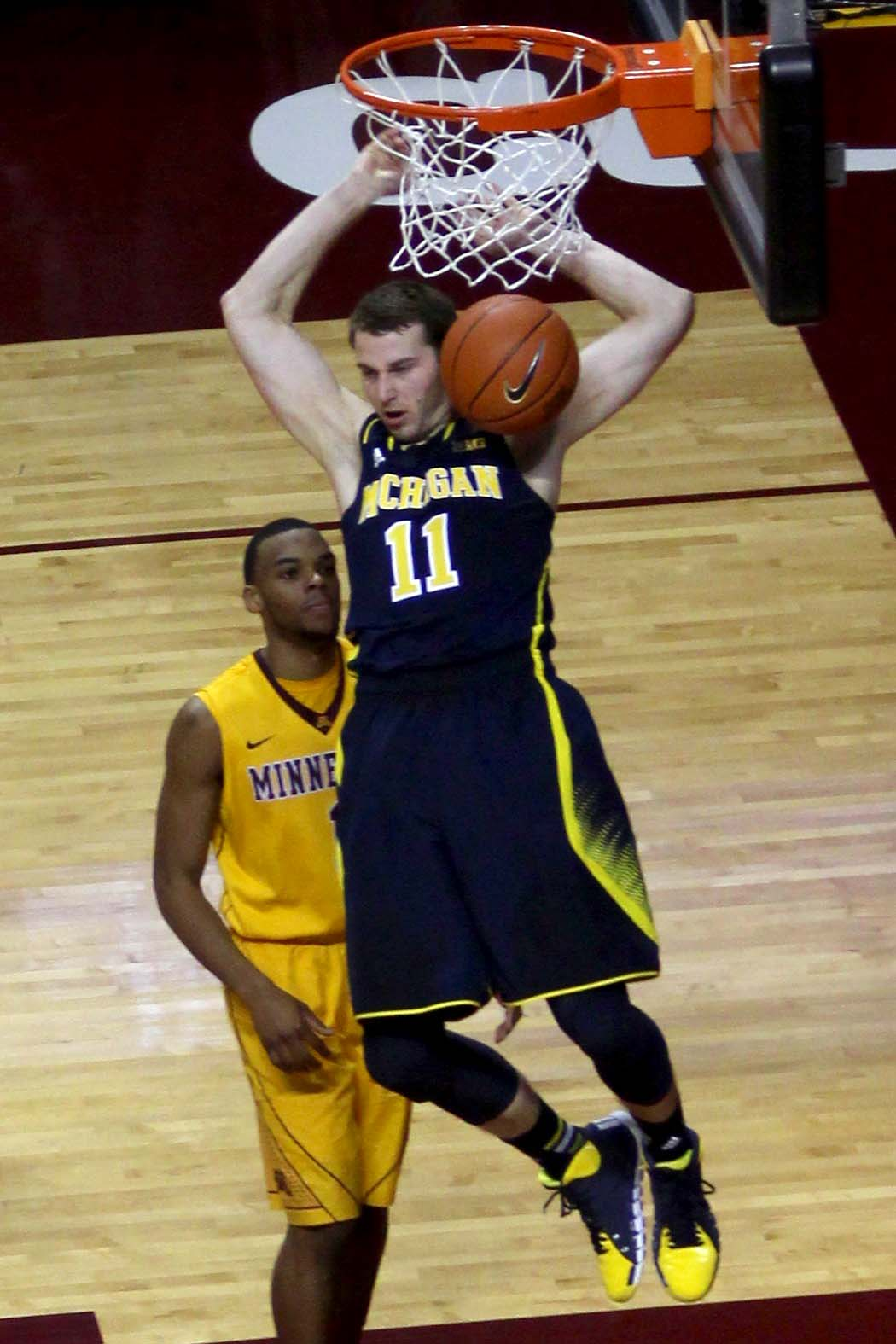
Stauskas (#11) while with Michigan in 2014

On February 13, Stauskas was one of four Big Ten players (along with Keith Appling, Gary Harris and Roy Devyn Marble) who were named to the 30-man Naismith College Player of the Year midseason watchlist. On March 8, Stauskas was one of two Big Ten players (along with Harris) listed among the 15 finalists for the John R. Wooden Award.

Stauskas was a 2014 NCAA Men's Basketball All-American second-team selection by the Sporting News. Stauskas earned third team All-American recognition from USA Today. He was a first team All-American selection by the National Association of Basketball Coaches (NABC). He was also a second team selection by Sports Illustrated and Bleacher Report, as well as a third team selection by NBC Sports. When Stauskas was named second team All-American by the Associated Press, he became a consensus All-American. Stauskas also earned John R. Wooden Award All-American Team recognition.

Stauskas was the Big Ten Conference Men's Basketball Player of the Year and a unanimous first-team All-Big Ten selection by both the coaches and the media, becoming Michigan's fifth B1G player of the year and second consecutive. On March 11 Stauskas was named District V (OH, IN, IL, MI, MN, WI) Player of the Year by the United States Basketball Writers Association. Stauskas was listed on the National Association of Basketball Coaches Division I All‐District 7 first team on March 12. Stauskas was named to the 2014 Big Ten Men's Basketball Tournament All-Tournament Team.

=== Statistics ===
Stauskas's career free throw percentage of 83.16% is second in Michigan history, and his 44.10% three-point shot percentage ranks fifth.

Year	Team	GP	GS	MPG	FG%	3P%	FT%	RPG	APG	SPG	BPG	PPG
2012–13	Michigan	39	33	30.5	.463	.440	.851	3.0	1.3	0.6	0.2	11.0
2013–14	Michigan	36	36	35.6	.470	.442	.824	2.9	3.3	0.6	0.3	17.5

The maize and blue Michigan Wolverines colored Canadian flag used to cheer on Stauskas

== Professional career ==
=== 2014 NBA draft ===
Discussion about him entering the 2014 NBA draft began in January 2014, while his father told Sports Illustrated, "He knows all he has to do is keep his nose to the grindstone for another couple of months, and there's a really good possibility he might be able to go pro." However, a few days later, Stauskas attempted to distance himself from his father's statements and apologized to his fans. Following the season, Stauskas, who was regarded as a likely late first round selection, said he would need some time to process his decision and that he would make his decision after talking to his coaches and family. On April 6, Stauskas said he would make his decision within the next week or so. On April 10, reports emerged that Stauskas had decided to go pro, but he denied he had made a decision. The reports were based on rumors that Stauskas had decided to hire Mark Bartelstein as his agent. Bartelstein is the father of former Michigan teammate Josh Bartelstein, and agent for former teammate Tim Hardaway Jr.

=== Sacramento Kings (2014–2015) ===
Stauskas was drafted eighth overall by the Sacramento Kings. He was the highest Michigan selection since Jamal Crawford went eighth in the 2000 NBA draft. With teammates McGary and Robinson also being drafted, it marked the first time Michigan had at least three draft picks since the 1990 NBA draft. With Burke and Hardaway having been drafted the year before, every player that started in the 2013 NCAA Men's Division I Basketball Championship Game was drafted either in the 2013 or 2014 NBA draft.

Following the draft, Kings owner Vivek Ranadivé described the rookie as a player who "shoots like Steph and "[is] big like Klay". It was later reported that Ranadivé had overruled his front office's preference for Elfrid Payton. Both Ranadivé and then head coach Michael Malone considered Stauskas' skills (as well as criticisms) to be reminiscent of the Splash Brothers, whom they observed first-hand while part of the Golden State Warriors organization – as co-owner and assistant coach respectively.

On July 8, 2014, Stauskas signed a rookie scale contract with the Sacramento Kings. Stauskas committed to represent the Sacramento Kings in 2014 NBA Summer League., ultimately starting on the team that would win the Summer League championship. In the 2014–15 NBA.com Rookie Survey at the annual Rookie Photo Shoot on August 6, Stauskas was named by his peers as the second best shooter in the Rookie class behind Doug McDermott. During his first preseason, he garnered publicity for the statement "I understand that I'm a rookie and I'm white, so people are going to attack me" because of stereotypes about race and his unproven and presumably weak defensive skills. Stauskas was surprised by the attention the statement received. In his first week in the league, he had a 3-block game against the Los Angeles Clippers. On December 8 in his first game against Utah and former teammate and fellow Big Ten Player of the Year Burke, Stauskas posted career highs of 15 points and 8 rebounds. Stauskas again posted 15 points against the New York Knicks and former Michigan teammate Tim Hardaway Jr. on March 3. On March 24, he received the nickname "Sauce Castillo" via social media after a closed captioning error. Stauskas started in the Kings' April 15 season finale against the Los Angeles Lakers and tallied 5 assists. It was his first and only start of the season.

=== Philadelphia 76ers (2015–2017) ===
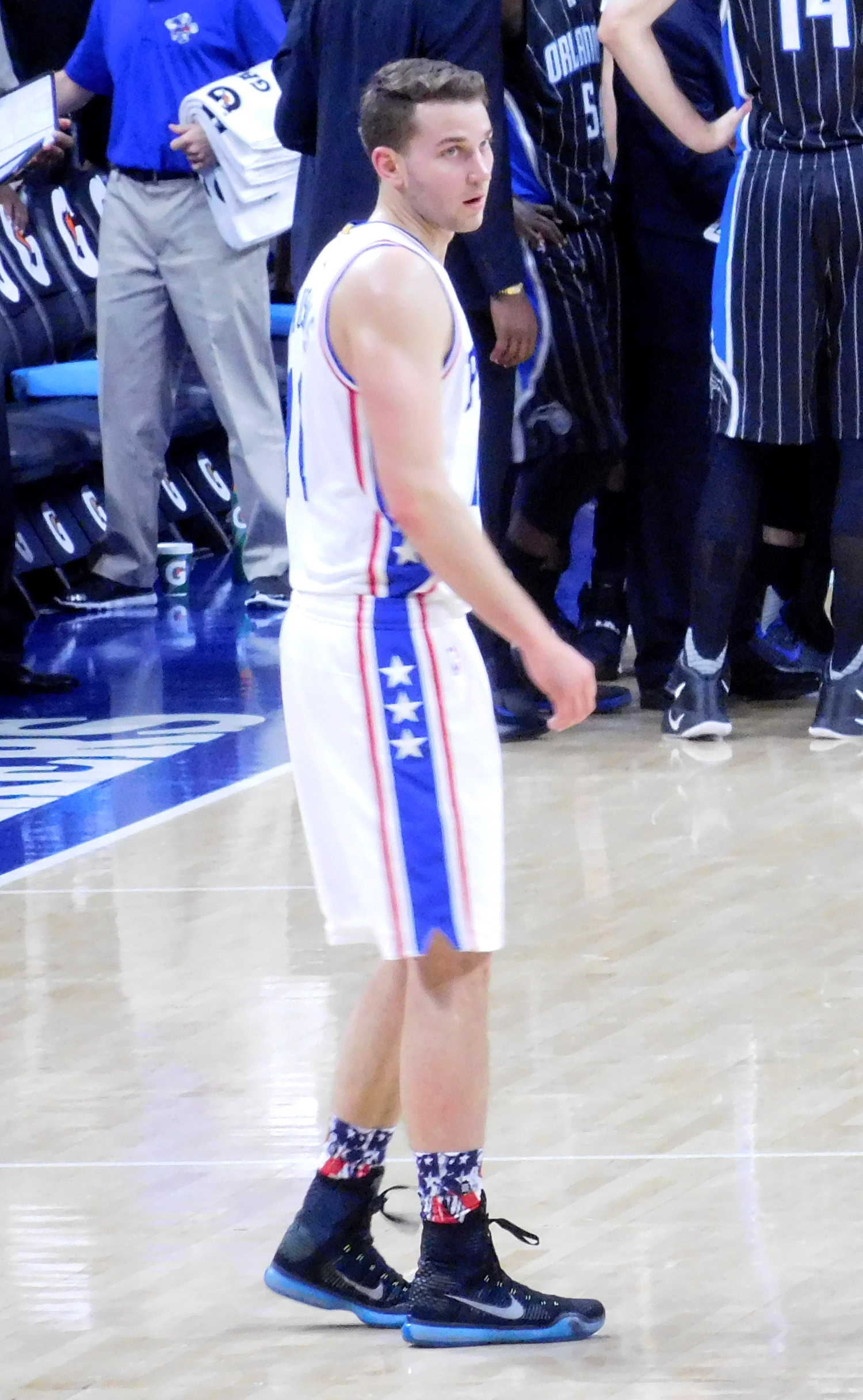
Stauskas with the 76ers in 2015

On July 10, 2015, Stauskas was traded to the Philadelphia 76ers along with Carl Landry, Jason Thompson, a future first round pick, and the rights to swap first round picks in 2016 and 2017, in exchange for the rights to Artūras Gudaitis and Luka Mitrović. For the Kings, the trade's goal was to clear cap space.

During the preseason, Stauskas was impaired by a right tibia stress reaction. Although he felt recovered from the stress reaction by the beginning of the season, he missed the October 28 season opener with back spasms. Stauskas debuted for the 76ers on October 30 against the Utah Jazz, scoring 12 points. Stauskas moved into the starting lineup on November 2 against the Cleveland Cavaliers. He posted a career-high-tying 15 points. On November 7, Stauskas posted a career-high 18 points and career-high tying five assists against the Orlando Magic.

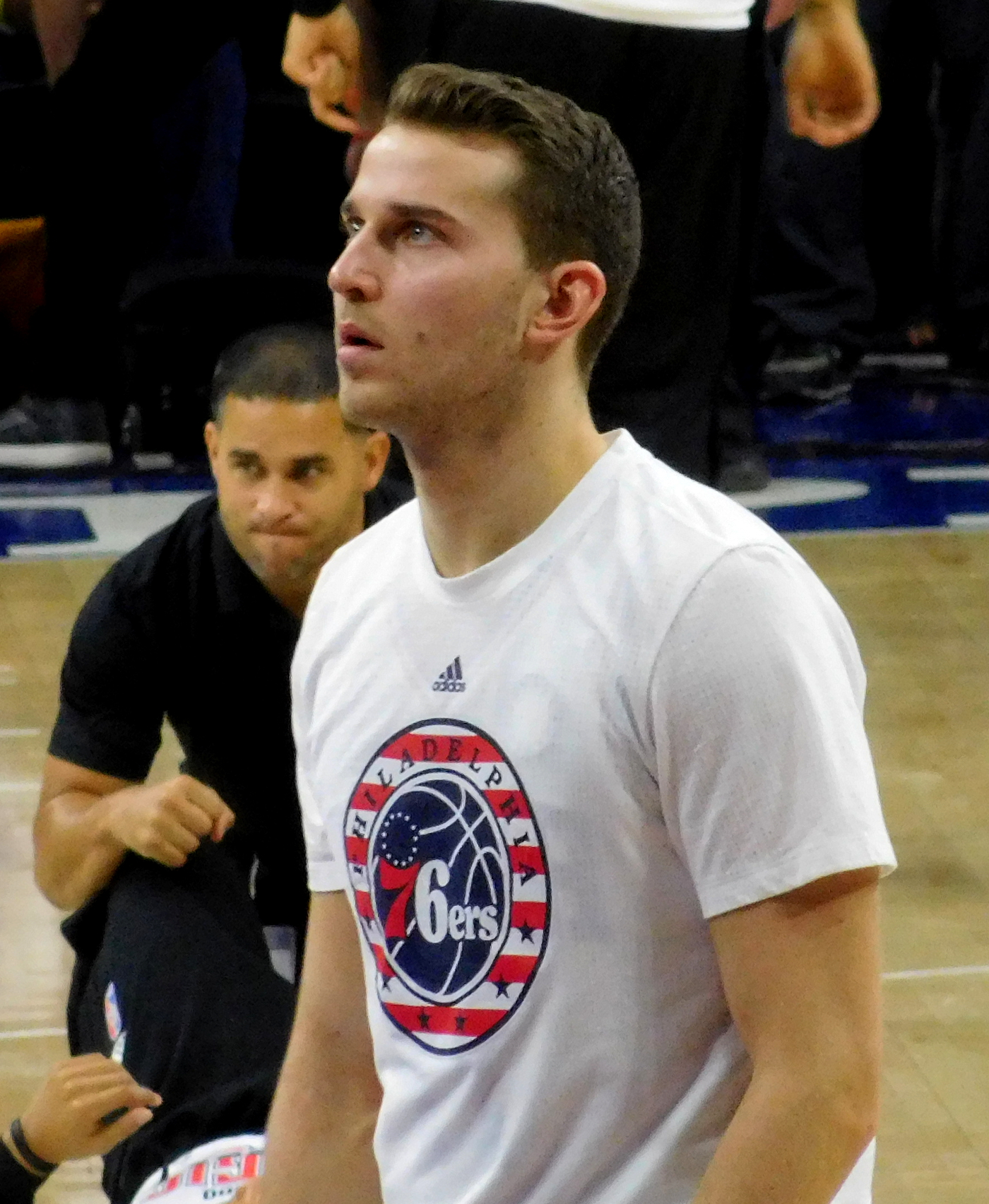
Stauskas in 2015

On December 1, Stauskas and the 76ers defeated the Los Angeles Lakers 103–91. The win ended the longest losing streak in the history of major professional sports in the United States (28 games going back to the prior season) and the worst start in NBA history (tied with the 2009–10 New Jersey Nets at 0–18). Stauskas was injured in overtime of the January 15, 2016 contest against the Chicago Bulls and missed three games before returning to the lineup on January 25 against the Boston Celtics. Stauskas established a new career high on March 18 against the Oklahoma City Thunder, scoring 23 points.

After the first week of the 2016–17 NBA season, the 76ers exercised the fourth-year team option. On November 19, 2016, Stauskas scored 21 points, while shooting 8-for-9 in a 120–105 win over the Phoenix Suns. He posted a career-high 24 points on 4-for-7 three-point shooting on March 4 in a 136–106 loss to Detroit. On March 20 against Orlando and March 22 against Oklahoma City, Stauskas reached 20 points in consecutive contests for the first time in his NBA career.

=== Brooklyn Nets (2017–2018) ===
On December 7, 2017, Stauskas was traded, along with Jahlil Okafor and a 2019 second round draft pick, to the Brooklyn Nets in exchange for Trevor Booker. In his debut for the Nets on December 15, 2017, Stauskas scored a team-high 22 points in a 120–87 loss to the Toronto Raptors. In his first few weeks with Brooklyn, he made 19 of his first 33 shots (57.6%) from beyond the three-point line and set a career high with 7 made three-point shots (on 7-for-10 shooting) on December 27 against the New Orleans Pelicans, which tied a Nets franchise record by a performance off the bench.

=== Portland Trail Blazers (2018–2019) ===
On July 5, 2018, Stauskas signed with the Portland Trail Blazers. In his debut for the Trail Blazers in their season opener on October 18, 2018, Stauskas came off the bench to score a career-high-tying 24 points in a 128–119 win over the Los Angeles Lakers.

=== Cleveland Cavaliers (2019) ===
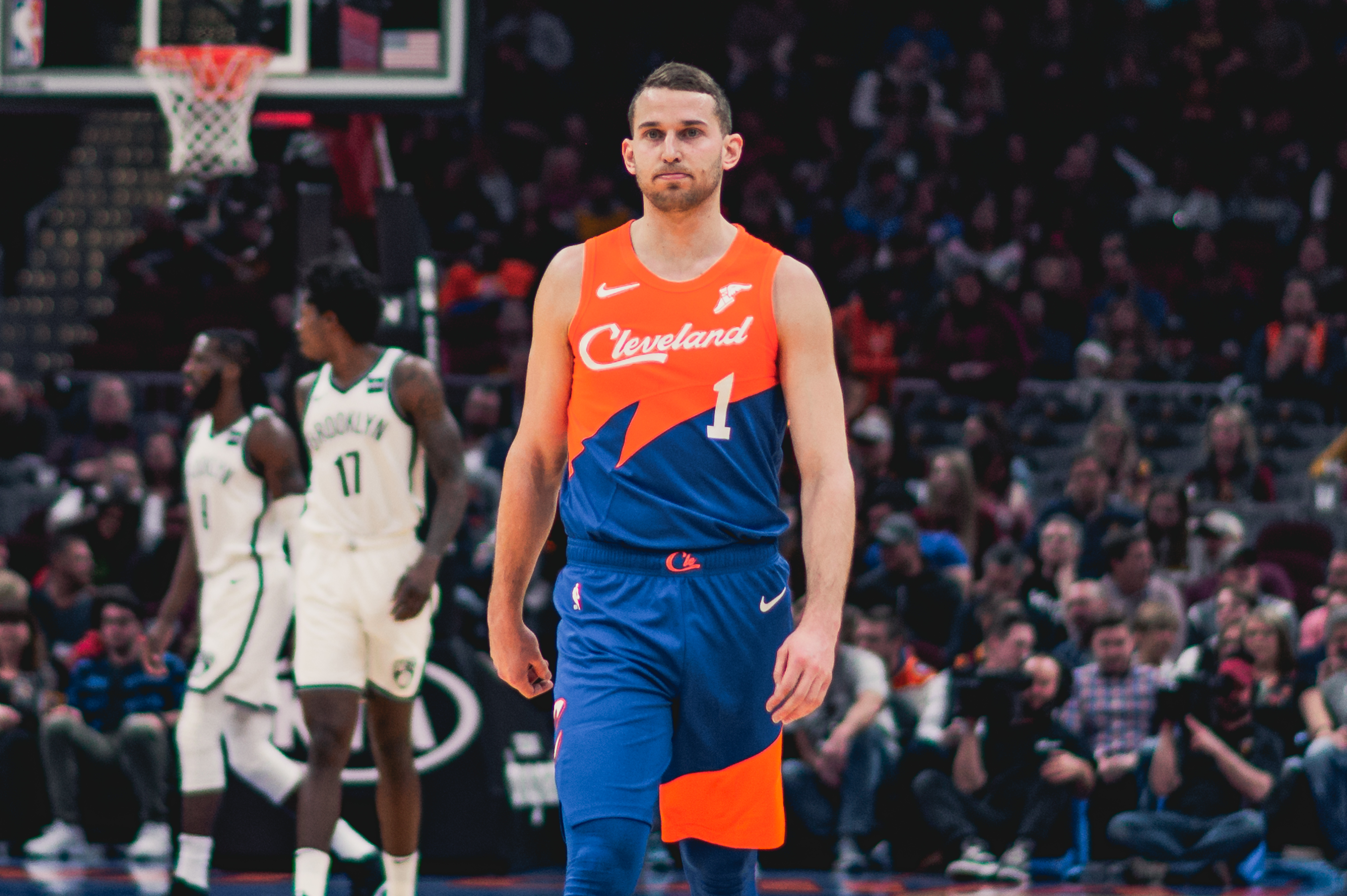
Stauskas with the Cavaliers in 2019

On February 4, 2019, Stauskas was traded to the Cleveland Cavaliers along with Wade Baldwin IV and two second-round picks for Rodney Hood. Three days later, he was acquired by the Houston Rockets in a three-team trade that involved the Cavaliers and Sacramento Kings. Hours later, he was traded again, this time to the Indiana Pacers alongside Baldwin, a 2021 second-round draft pick and the rights to Maarty Leunen, in exchange for cash considerations. He was waived by the Pacers on February 8. On February 11, Stauskas signed with the Cavaliers.

=== Baskonia (2019–2020) ===
On August 1, 2019, Stauskas signed a one-year deal with Spanish EuroLeague club Kirolbet Baskonia. On February 12, 2020, Baskonia and Stauskas agreed to terminate the contract.

On December 3, 2020, Stauskas was signed to a training camp contract by the Milwaukee Bucks. He was waived at the end of training camp.

=== Raptors 905 (2021) ===
On January 27, 2021, Stauskas was included on the Raptors 905 roster for the 2020–21 season.

=== Grand Rapids Gold (2021) ===
On October 16, Stauskas was signed by the Denver Nuggets, but was waived later that day. He subsequently joined the Grand Rapids Gold as an affiliate player.

=== Miami Heat (2021–2022) ===
On December 31, 2021, Stauskas signed a 10-day contract with the Miami Heat.

=== Return to Grand Rapids (2022) ===
Following the expiration of his 10-day contract, Stauskas returned to the Grand Rapids Gold. On March 1, 2022, he scored a franchise-record 57 points in a 131–127 win over the Wisconsin Herd. Alongside the feat, which was the sixth-highest scoring total in NBA G League history, he logged a G League-record 38 first half points. Stauskas made his first 12 shots in the game (including a 9–9/24 point first quarter), marking the second-highest scoring 100% FG% quarter in league history. The 38-point first half was one point shy of the G League record for either half. The next day, Stauskas posted 43 points against the Lakeland Magic, becoming the second G League player (Russ Smith, 105 March 2016) to achieve at least 100 points in consecutive games and the first to do it on consecutive nights. Stauskas' 100-point effort coincided with the 60th anniversary of Wilt Chamberlain's 100-point game. On March 8, 2022, he was named G League Player of the Week.

=== Boston Celtics (2022) ===
On March 4, 2022, Stauskas signed a two-year contract with the Boston Celtics. Stauskas and the Celtics reached the 2022 NBA Finals, where they lost in 6 games to the Golden State Warriors.

On July 9, 2022, Stauskas was traded, alongside Daniel Theis, Aaron Nesmith, Malik Fitts, Juwan Morgan and a 2023 first-round pick, to the Indiana Pacers in exchange for Malcolm Brogdon. On July 14, Stauskas was waived by the Pacers. Stauskas' G-League rights were still held by the Gold, who traded them to the College Park Skyhawks, who turned around and dealt him to the Minnesota Timberwolves. Stauskas entered training camp under contract with the Timberwolves, who assigned his rights to the Iowa Wolves.

After his tenure with the Celtics, Stauskas retired from professional basketball.

== National team career ==
Stauskas played for Canada in the 2009 FIBA Americas Under-16 Championship held in Argentina. He helped lead the Canadian junior national team to a bronze medal, which qualified them for the 2010 FIBA Under-17 World Championship. He averaged 9.4 points per game in the tournament, including a game-high 21 points in a 126–78 loss against the United States team led by Bradley Beal and James Michael McAdoo on June 20, 2009. First overall 2013 NBA draft pick Anthony Bennett was one of Stauskas' teammates in the tournament.

After joining the NCAA in 2013, Stauskas stated that would consider the possibility to represent Lithuania, but went on to play for his birth country, Canada.

Stauskas was later invited to train with the Canada senior national team.

He represented Canada at the 2015 FIBA Americas Championship, contributing 111 points in 9 games—including 18-for-36 three-point shooting, but did not play in the team's final game. Food poisoning had impaired him in the semifinal loss against Venezuela, and the illness caused him to miss the bronze medal game against Mexico, which Canada won 87–86.

== Career statistics ==
Legend
GP	Games played	GS	Games started	MPG	Minutes per game
FG%	Field goal percentage	3P%	3-point field goal percentage	FT%	Free throw percentage
RPG	Rebounds per game	APG	Assists per game	SPG	Steals per game
BPG	Blocks per game	PPG	Points per game	**Bold**	Career high

=== NBA ===
==== Regular season ====
Year	Team	GP	GS	MPG	FG%	3P%	FT%	RPG	APG	SPG	BPG	PPG
2014–15	Sacramento	73	1	15.4	.365	.322	.859	1.2	.9	.3	.2	4.4
2015–16	Philadelphia	73	**35**	24.8	.385	.326	.771	2.5	1.9	**.6**	.3	8.5
2016–17	Philadelphia	**80**	27	**27.4**	.396	.368	.813	**2.8**	**2.4**	**.6**	**.4**	**9.5**
2017–18	Philadelphia	6	0	7.5	.250	.000	**1.000**	.2	.2	.7	.0	.7
2017–18	Brooklyn	35	0	13.7	.393	.404	.704	1.8	1.1	.1	.1	5.1
2018–19	Portland	44	0	15.3	**.419**	.344	.889	1.8	1.4	.3	.1	6.1
2018–19	Cleveland	24	0	14.3	.367	.429	.893	2.0	.8	.3	.1	5.5
2021–22	Miami	2	0	12.0	.375	**.500**	.750	1.5	.5	.0	.0	5.5
2021–22	Boston	6	0	2.5	.333	.333	.500	.0	.2	.0	.0	1.2
Career		343	63	19.5	.389	.354	.812	2.0	1.5	.4	.2	6.7

==== Playoffs ====
Year	Team	GP	GS	MPG	FG%	3P%	FT%	RPG	APG	SPG	BPG	PPG
2022	Boston	13	0	1.8	.250	.300	1.000	.3	.3	.0	.0	1.0
Career		13	0	1.8	.250	.300	1.000	.3	.3	.0	.0	1.0

=== EuroLeague ===
Year	Team	GP	GS	MPG	FG%	3P%	FT%	RPG	APG	SPG	BPG	PPG	PIR
2019–20	Baskonia	22	12	20.5	.415	.422	.781	2.1	1.6	.5	.2	9.0	6.8
Career		22	12	20.5	.415	.422	.781	2.1	1.6	.5	.2	9.0	6.8

=== College ===
Year	Team	GP	GS	MPG	FG%	3P%	FT%	RPG	APG	SPG	BPG	PPG
2012-13	Michigan	**39**	33	30.5	.463	.440	**.851**	**3.0**	1.3	**.6**	.2	11.0
2013-14	Michigan	36	**36**	**35.6**	**.470**	**.442**	.824	2.9	**3.3**	**.6**	**.3**	**17.5**
Career		75	69	32.9	.467	.441	.832	2.9	2.3	.6	.3	14.1

== Personal life ==
Stauskas is the son of Paul and Ruta Stauskas. His brother's name is Peter. Three of Stauskas's four grandparents lived in Lithuania before World War II. Stauskas previously attended Lithuanian Saturday School in Toronto and is able to understand and speak some Lithuanian.

In 2016, Stauskas visited Lithuania for the first time.

== See also ==
- List of Canadians in the National Basketball Association
- Michigan Wolverines men's basketball statistical leaders
