= Shaun Suisham =

Canadian football player (born 1981)

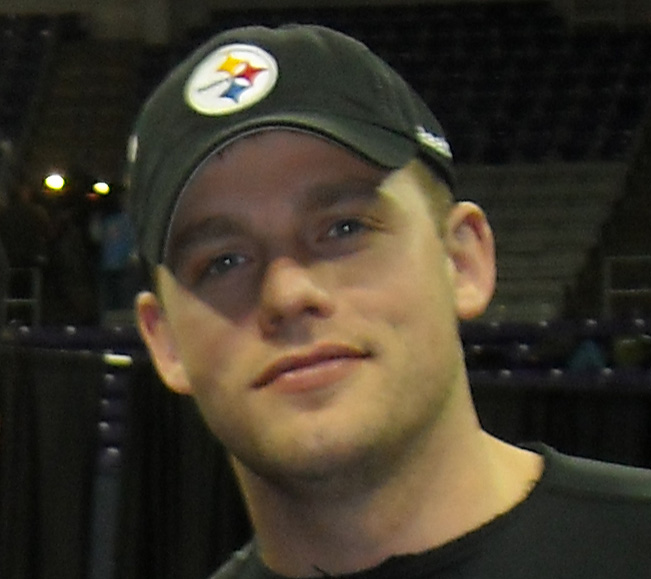
- Suisham prior to Super Bowl XLV in 2011

No. 4, 6
- Position: Placekicker

Personal information
- Born: December 29, 1981 (age 44); Wallaceburg, Ontario, Canada
- Listed height: 6 ft 0 in (1.83 m)
- Listed weight: 199 lb (90 kg)

Career information
- High school: Wallaceburg District
- College: Bowling Green (2000–2004)
- NFL draft: 2005: undrafted
- CFL draft: 2004: 3rd round, 20th overall pick

Career history
- Pittsburgh Steelers (2005)*; Dallas Cowboys (2005–2006); San Francisco 49ers (2006)*; Washington Redskins (2006–2009); Dallas Cowboys (2009); Cleveland Browns (2010)*; St. Louis Rams (2010)*; Pittsburgh Steelers (2010–2015)
- * Offseason or practice squad member only

Awards and highlights
- Second-team All-MAC (2004)

Career NFL statistics
- Games played: 128
- Field goals made: 211
- Field goals attempted: 251
- Field goal %: 84.1%
- Longest field goal: 53
- Touchbacks: 139
- Stats at Pro Football Reference

Shaun Christopher Suisham (/ˈswiːzəm/; born December 29, 1981) is a Canadian former professional American football player who was a placekicker in the National Football League (NFL), primarily for the Pittsburgh Steelers, while also playing for the Dallas Cowboys and Washington Redskins. He was signed by the Steelers as an undrafted free agent in 2005. He played college football for the Bowling Green Falcons.

== Early life ==
Suisham was born in Wallaceburg, Ontario, to Rick and Wendy Suisham. He attended Holy Family Catholic School before attending Wallaceburg District Secondary School, where he began playing football under his uncle Rob MacLachlan, the coach of the team. He also helped Suisham make a highlight reel to send out to colleges.

As a junior in 1998, he kicked two field goals (from 58 and 27 yards) and helped Wallaceburg win the league championship for the first time since 1968. As a senior in 1999, he was named the conference offensive MVP. He was also rated as the number-one placekicker in Canada, after setting school and Ontario field goal records.

== College career ==
Suisham accepted a football scholarship from Bowling Green State University, starting from the spring 2000 semester. He suffered an injury during spring practice and was forced to take a medical redshirt. He played under coach Urban Meyer in 2001 and 2002.

As a freshman, he was named the starter at placekicker, converting 44-of-45 extra points, 3-of-8 field goal attempts and scoring 53 points.

As a sophomore, he converted 12-of-14 field goal attempts and set a new Mid-American Conference and school record by converting 57-of-59 extra point tries. He had a career-high 3 field goals made against the University of Missouri.

As a junior, he converted 16-of-24 field goal attempts and 56-of-60 extra point tries. In the season opener against Eastern Kentucky University, he set school records for extra point attempts and conversion in a single-game, making all of his 9 tries. He kicked a season-long 47-yard field goal against Purdue University.

As a senior, he converted 14-of-20 field goal attempts, set a Mid-American Conference record by making all 69 of his extra points attempts and kicked a career-long 52-yard field goal against Ohio State University. He was a Lou Groza Award semifinalist after finishing 12th in the nation in scoring with a 9.3 points-per-game average. He set the All-time NCAA Division I record for extra points made in a career (226).

He left Bowling Green as the all-time leading scorer of the Falcons football team with 361 points, while also setting records with 45 career field goals and 31 touchbacks. He graduated in 2005 with a degree in exercise science.

== Professional career ==
=== Pittsburgh Steelers (first stint) ===
Suisham was selected by the Ottawa Renegades in the third round (20th overall) of the 2004 CFL draft and his rights were traded to the Edmonton Eskimos. He instead opted to sign as an undrafted free agent with the Pittsburgh Steelers of the National Football League on April 28. He played in the first game of the preseason against the Philadelphia Eagles, converting a 46-yard field goal and an extra point. On August 28, he was waived after not being able to pass Jeff Reed on the depth chart.

=== Dallas Cowboys (first stint) ===
On September 4, 2005, he was signed by the Dallas Cowboys to their practice squad. On October 11, he was released and later re-signed to the practice squad on October 18. On October 24, he was promoted to active roster to replace José Cortez. After two weeks on the team, in which he went 2 for 2 on field goals, he was released on November 19, so the Cowboys could sign Billy Cundiff. On December 26, he was re-signed for the season finale after Cundiff struggled.

On March 23, 2006, the team signed Mike Vanderjagt to improve its kicking game. Vanderjagt suffered a groin injury in training camp that kept him out of action for most of the preseason games. He returned for the final preseason game against the Minnesota Vikings, but missed two field goals in overtime of 32 and 33 yards (both misses were wide right), forcing the contest to end in a tie. These circumstances forced the Cowboys to make the unconventional move of keeping 2 kickers on the regular season roster, helping Suisham to make the team. He was named the starter for the Cowboys' season opener against the Jacksonville Jaguars on September 10, 2006. He attempted two kicks during the game, the first of which was good from a then-career-long 52 yards. The second attempt, which would have given the Cowboys the lead, hit the right upright of the goalpost. He went on to kick for five more weeks as a kick off specialist. On October 12, he was released and signed to the practice squad on October 14. He was released on October 17.

=== San Francisco 49ers ===
On October 24, 2006, Suisham was signed to the San Francisco 49ers' practice squad. He was released on October 31.

=== Washington Redskins ===
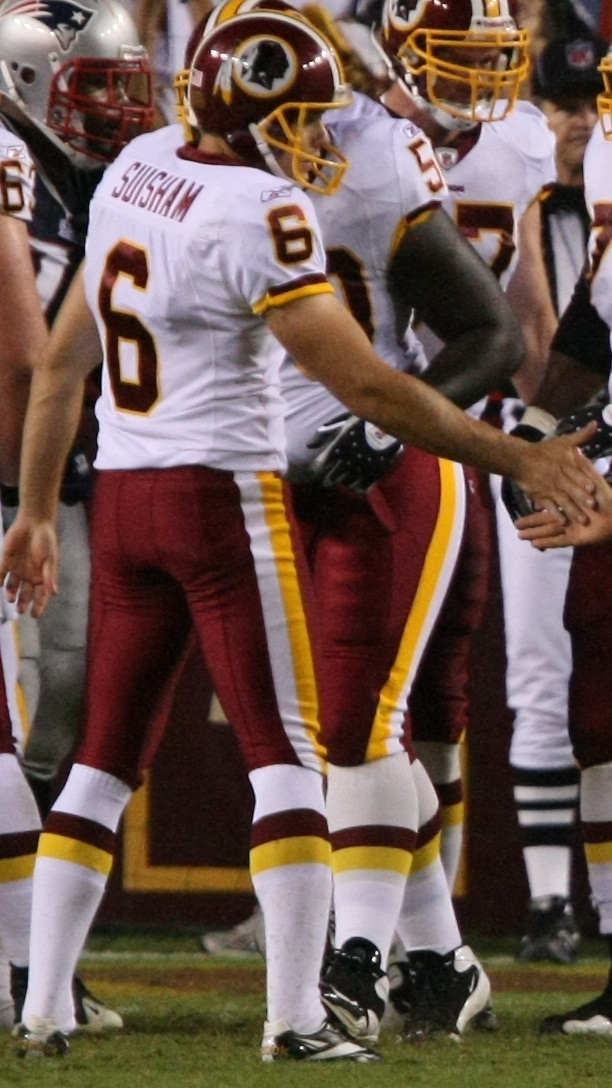
Suisham in August 2009 with the Washington Redskins.

On November 28, 2006, he was signed to the Washington Redskins' practice squad. On December 2, he was promoted to the active roster. Despite missing his first field goal attempt (from 50 yards) and struggling on kickoffs against the Atlanta Falcons, the team decided to keep him instead of placekicker Nick Novak. He would go on to make 8 consecutive field goals to finish out the year. He kicked his first game-winning field goal from 39 yards in an overtime victory over the Miami Dolphins in the Redskins' season-opener on September 9, 2007.

On March 16, 2009, he was re-signed by the Redskins. On December 6, he missed a 23-yard field goal that likely would have sealed an upset win against the undefeated New Orleans Saints. The team went on to lose the game in overtime, 33–30. On December 8, he was released and replaced him with former UFL kicker Graham Gano.

=== Dallas Cowboys (second stint) ===
On December 21, 2009, the Cowboys signed Suisham, after Nick Folk missed 10 field goals during the season. He was two out of three in the regular season. On January 17, 2010, he played in the NFC Divisional Playoff game against the Minnesota Vikings, his fourth game after replacing Nick Folk. He missed twice, including kicks from 48 and 49 yards, making one field goal from 33 yards. He was not re-signed after the season.

=== Cleveland Browns ===
On May 18, 2010, Suisham signed as a free agent with the Cleveland Browns. On June 17, he was released after not being able to pass Phil Dawson on the depth chart.

=== St. Louis Rams ===
On August 12, 2010, Suisham was signed by the St. Louis Rams. On August 17, he was released after not being able to pass Josh Brown on the depth chart.

=== Pittsburgh Steelers (second stint) ===
==== 2010 season ====
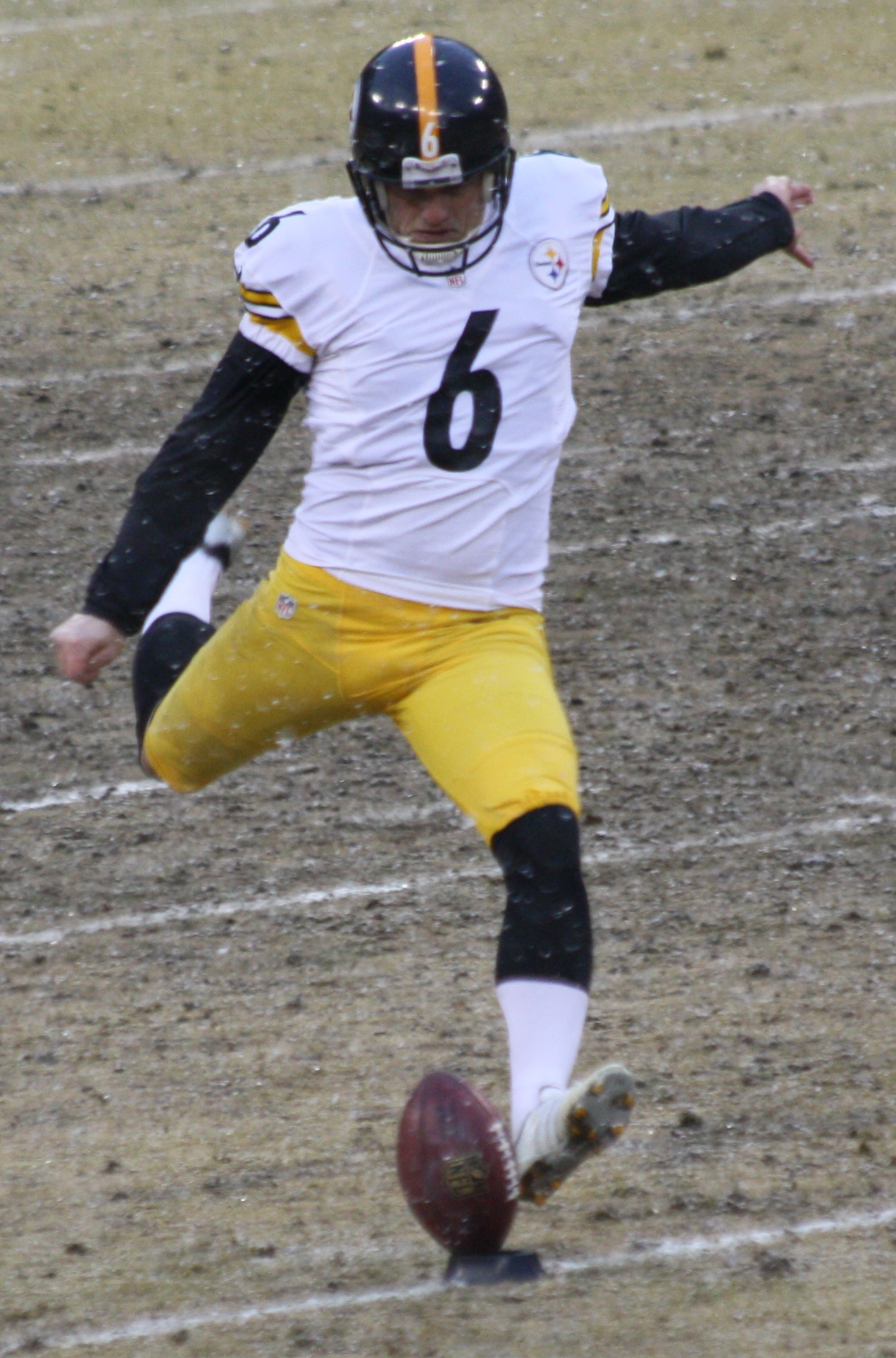
Shaun Suisham at practice in 2013

On November 16, 2010, Suisham signed with the Pittsburgh Steelers after a tryout, as Jeff Reed had poor outings throughout the 2010 season. On November 28, Suisham kicked four 40+ yard field goals (45, 46, 48, and 41 yards) against Buffalo, including the game-winning kick in overtime. No other player in NFL history had kicked four field goals of 40 yards or longer, including an OT game-winner, in one game, but he did it twice. He had a 5 field goal effort of 40+ yards for the Redskins in a 23–20 overtime victory over the Jets in 2007.

On December 5, Suisham made two field goals in the Steelers 13–10 victory against the Baltimore Ravens. He also handled the punting duties for the Steelers after Daniel Sepulveda tore his ACL. On December 12, he made three field goals in the Steelers' victory over the Bengals.

Suisham finished the regular season 14 of 15 on field goal attempts, with his only miss coming from 41 yards out in Week 16 against the Carolina Panthers.

On January 15, 2011, Suisham missed a 43-yard field goal in the divisional playoff round, the first postseason miss by a Steelers kicker since Jeff Reed's rookie year of 2002.

On February 6, He converted a 33-yard field goal and missed a 52-yard field goal in Super Bowl XLV. The Steelers lost 31–25 to the Green Bay Packers.

==== 2011 season ====
On September 25, Suisham made a 38-yard game-winning field goal against the Indianapolis Colts with 4 seconds remaining in the 4th quarter. The Steelers lost to the San Francisco 49ers 20–3 on December 19, 2011, and the only scoring by Pittsburgh came from Suisham's 51-yard field goal in the second quarter. However, Suisham missed a 48-yard attempt wide left.

==== 2012 season ====
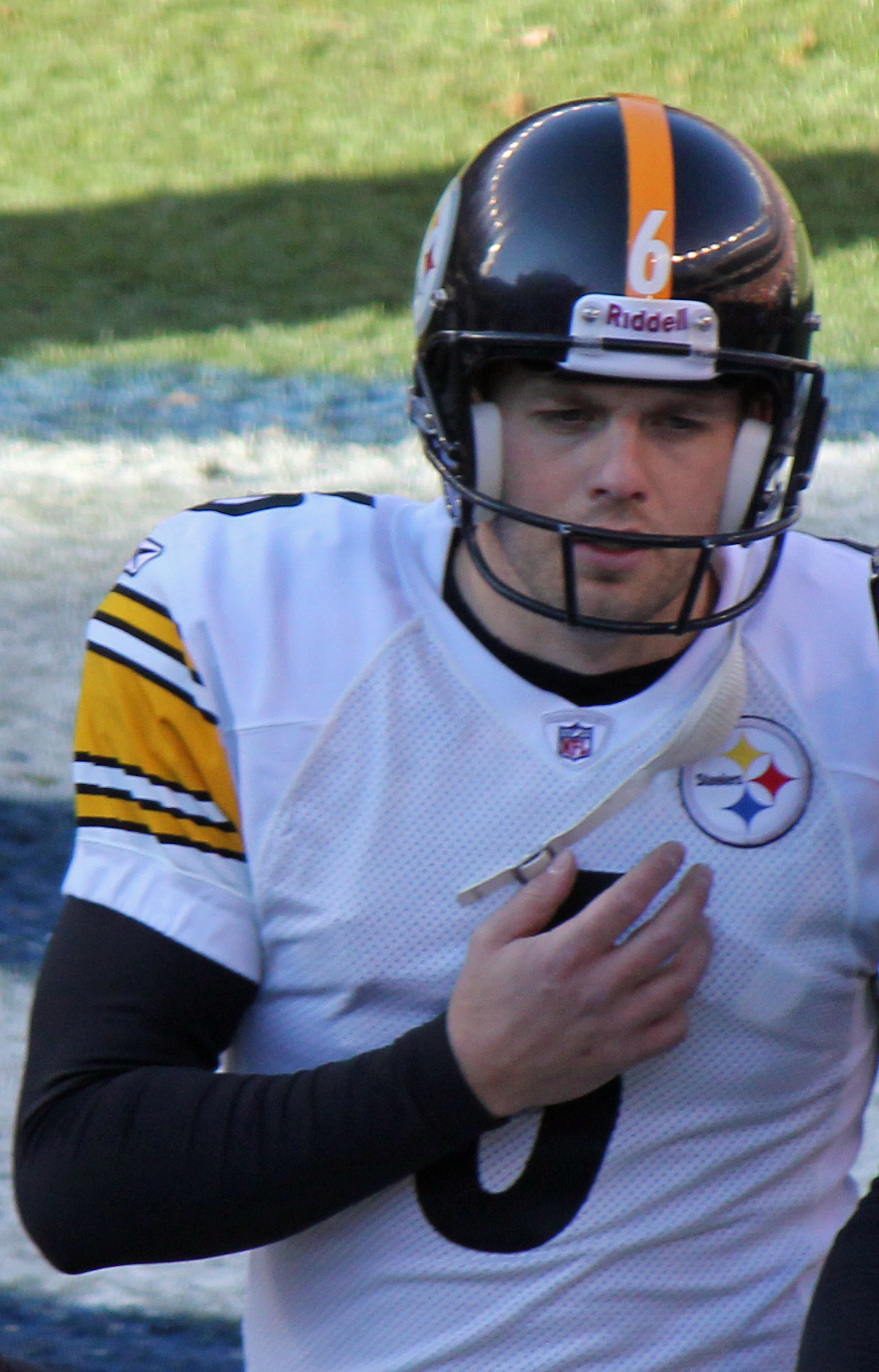
Suisham during the 3:16 game

On October 7, 2012, Suisham made a 34-yard game-winning field goal against the Philadelphia Eagles with 3 seconds left in the 4th quarter. The successful attempt made him 8-for-8 on the season.

On October 11, 2012, he failed to make a 54-yard attempt against the Tennessee Titans with the ball falling about one yard short of the uprights.

However, he made his next thirteen field goals following the miss, including game winners of 23 and 42 yards respectively against the Kansas City Chiefs and Baltimore Ravens.

==== 2013 season ====
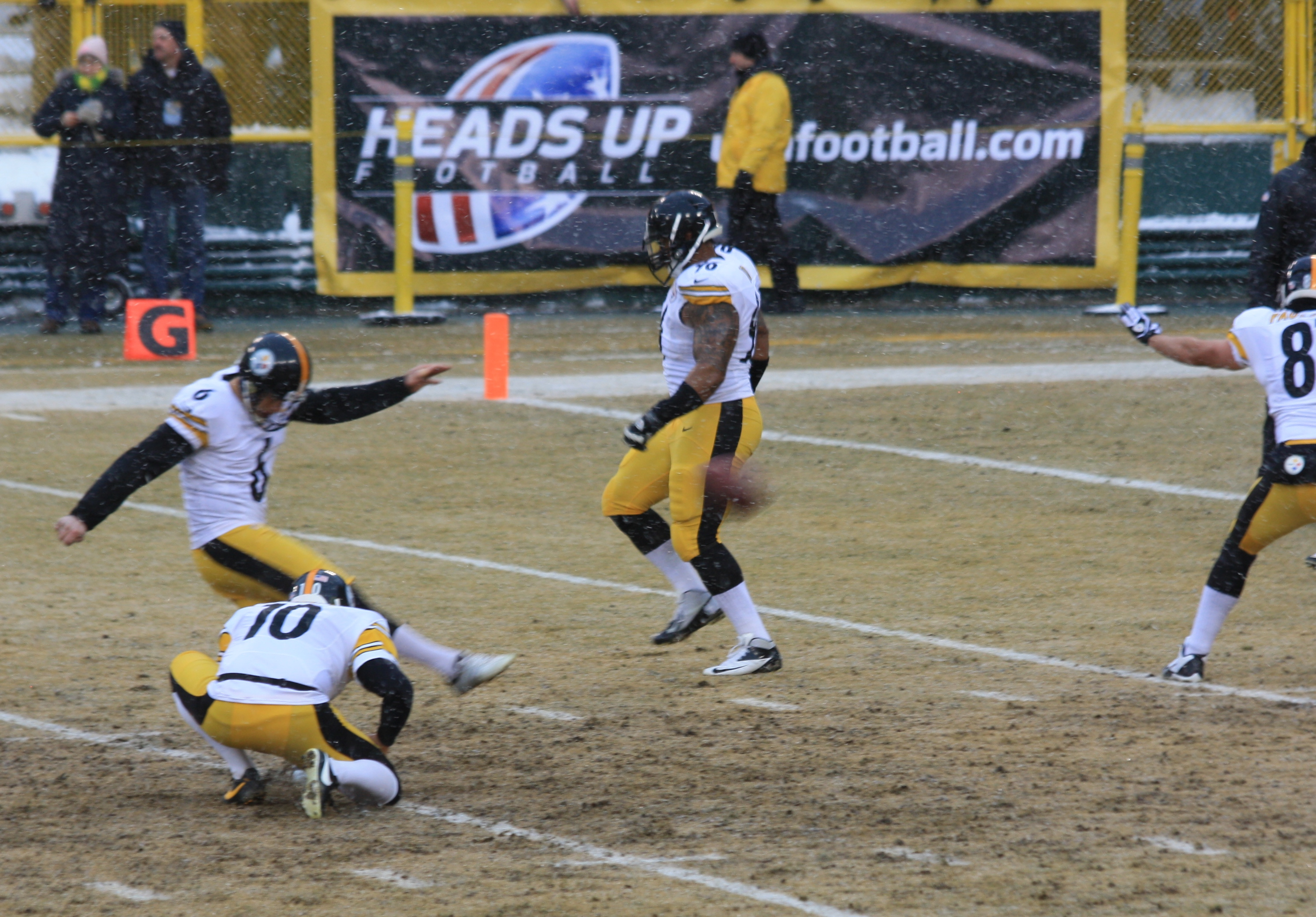
Suisham on a field goal attempt in 2013.

Suisham appeared in all 16 games, connecting on 30-of-32 field goal attempts in 2013, establishing a Steelers record (min. 15 attempts) with a 93.8% conversion mark. His 30 field goals made tied as the third-most in team history and his 129 points ranked fifth-most in a single-season.

On October 20, playing against the Baltimore Ravens, he was 4-of-4 on his field goal attempts and made a 42-yard field goal with no time remaining in the fourth quarter to seal a 19–16 win. He received AFC Special Teams Player of the Week honors for his efforts.

==== 2014 season ====
On August 1, 2014, the Steelers announced that his contract had been extended for four years through the 2018 season. He scored a career-best 132 points in the regular season (third in team history). He extended a streak of 30 consecutive field goal made from 40 to 49 yards. He made the ninth game-winning field goal of his career (seventh as a Steeler) on September 7.

On September 28, playing against the Tampa Bay Buccaneers, he passed Norm Johnson for the fourth-most extra points made in team history. He also connected on his first field goal of the contest, to extend his club record of 24 straight field goals made, before missing his second attempt.

On October 12, playing against the Cleveland Browns, he moved into fourth place on the club's all-time field goals made list. On November 30, playing against the New Orleans Saints, he scored 10 points to give him 509 for his Steelers' career and become the fourth kicker in club history to reach 500 points.

==== 2015 season ====
On August 9, 2015, Suisham told NFL reporters that he believed he had torn his anterior cruciate ligament in his left knee while covering the opening kickoff in the Pro Football Hall of Fame Game. An MRI was taken on August 10 and showed he had torn his ACL. He went on to miss the entire 2015 season and was replaced with Garrett Hartley at first and eventually with Chris Boswell.

On June 24, 2016, Suisham was released by the Steelers after a failed physical.

== Personal life ==
While with Washington, Suisham put on a free football camp for kids in the area of his hometown of Wallaceburg, Ontario. They offered hands-on-training, face time with the NFL kicker, and a "Pass, Punt, and Kick" competition.

Suisham played ice hockey growing up. When his two daughters started playing hockey, he got involved with the sport again. In 2014, while playing for the Steelers, Suisham began coaching girls youth hockey. In 2024, he was named Director of the Girls Hockey Program for the Pittsburgh Penguins Elite.
