= Wallaceburg District Secondary School =

Canadian high school

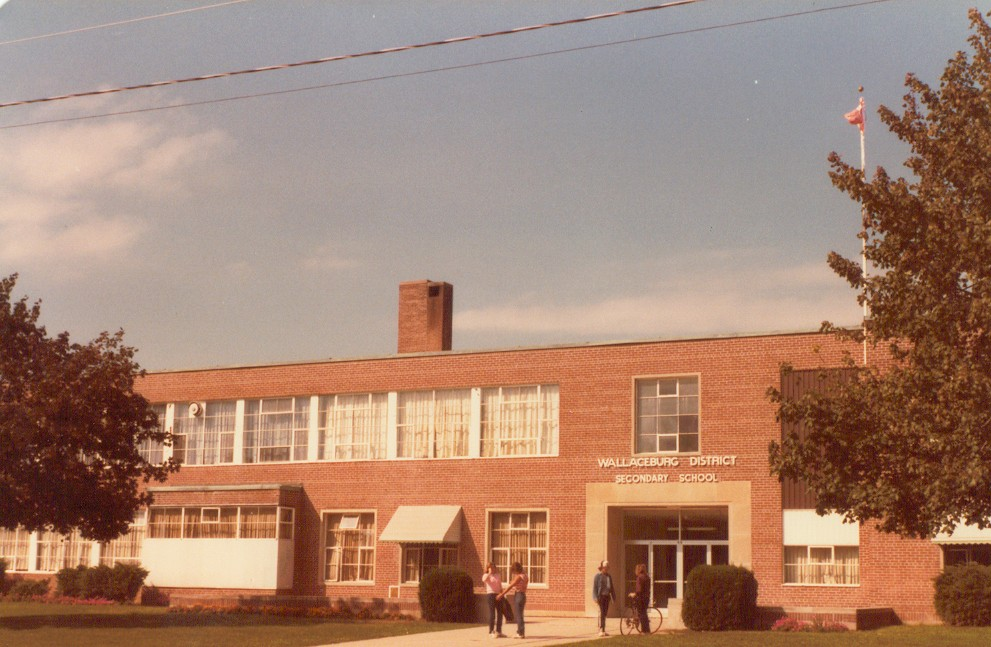
- WDSS front (1984)

Location
- 920 Elgin Street; Wallaceburg, Ontario, N8A 3E1; Canada; 42.5963°N 82.3917°W

Information
- School type: Public
- Founded: 1912
- School board: Lambton Kent District School Board
- Principal: Tiffany Cadotte
- Grades: 9 to 12
- Enrollment: 590 (2019/2020)
- Language: English/Ojibwe
- Colours: Maroon and white
- Team name: Tartans

Wallaceburg District Secondary School is the high school in Wallaceburg, Ontario, Canada. While offering education for grades 9 to 12, the building houses public school students for grades 7 and 8. The school comes within the control of the Lambton Kent District School Board. Feeder schools include the A. A. Wright Public School and H. W. Burgess Public School. Students also attend from the nearby Walpole Island First Nation.

The town competes with nearby Sarnia to the north and Chatham to the south, which affects the town and student populations.

== History ==
From 1887 to its fire in 1915, the North Side school at Lisgar and Elizabeth Streets served the needs of the pupils of Wallaceburg and surrounds' post-elementary school education.

On Lisgar Street the Wallaceburg Continuation School opened in 1912, to become the dedicated Wallaceburg High School in 1917. Edgar U. Dickenson became the principal, until his retirement in 1933, succeeded by William T. Laing.

Post-World War II, on 5 September 1950 the new Wallaceburg District High School was opened at the present location on Elgin Street under the custodianship of Principal W. Clair F. Weir and eighteen staff members. The new gymnasium became home to the Wallaceburg Basketball League.

The school was renamed in 1962 to the Wallaceburg District Secondary School.

County-wide school boards were introduced in 1969. In 1998 Kent County was dissolved, and Wallaceburg and the school became municipally part of Chatham-Kent.

In the 1980s and 1990s, students from the rural routes were bused in, and subject to snow days.

Grade 13 (as part of Ontario Academic Credit) was phased out in 2003. A number of students each year have also become Ontario Scholars. This declined with the removal of Grade 13 and the Ontario Secondary School Honours Graduation Diploma.

A time capsule located on the north wall of the main lobby was to be opened in 2007.

Ongoing impacts to high school student populations have occurred in line with the closure of its feeder schools such as W. T. Laing Public School in 2001, and the D. A. Gordon Public School in June 2014 (established 1922).

September 2014 saw WDSS accommodate the Grades 7 and 8 students from H. W. Burgess and A. A. Wright public schools, those schools becoming JK–Grade 6 schools. The Grades 7 and 8 students became housed in a separate wing of the school, which had been a Saint Clair College of Applied Arts and Technology campus.

Due to its small number of students, Wallaceburg Secondary has made the school smaller in order to use the land as a sports field.

Over the years there has been a student council and prefects.

In early 2026, the WDSS Drama Club advanced to the provincial level of the National Theatre School Drama Festival, with The Way Home being presented at York University, about a student escaping the Mohawk Institute residential school at Brantford. This was the first time the club had reached this level.

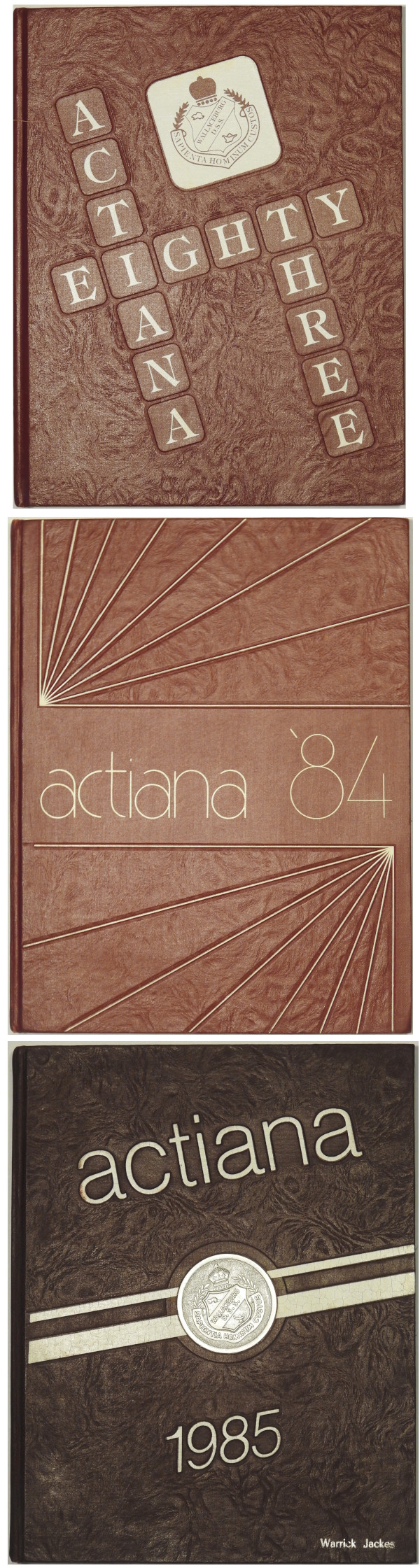
Yearbooks

=== Demographics ===
Staff size may give an indication of student population and school health.

Year	Students	Teachers	Office staff	Custodians	Cafeteria	Notes
1983	~1000	65	6	10	6	Includes Grade 13.
1984		72	5	8	6	Includes Grade 13.
1985		70	6	7	5	Includes Grade 13.
2019/2020	590					
2021/2021	555					Grades 9 to 12.

== Symbols ==
The school crest is a Tudor crown atop a shield, surrounded by a wreath and scroll. The shield has the word 'Wallaceburg' (or 'Wallaceburg District SS', or 'Wallaceburg DSS'), the oil lamp (representing learning), and a beaver (part of the then-town's coat of arms). The scroll has the Latin words Sapientia hominum custos (wisdom human keeper). It was designed by Principal Laing and W. Clair F. Weir in 1939.

The yearbook Actiana is the record of the school's engagements (since 1949). Year books were first introduced under Principal Dickenson (1917–1933), originally as the Tatler.

The present school colours of maroon and white/silver (usually against a grey contrast). These colours were introduced in 1948, replacing orange and black from 1912 to 1947.

The school ring is of silver, showing the wheat fields from the area's farming, the oil lamp of learning, a ruby stone, and the words 'Wallaceburg District SS'.

== Facilities ==
The school today is principally two-storey long brick buildings, fronting Elgin Street, and bounded by Selkirk Street and Lorne Avenue to the sides, and Brander Avenue to the rear. The rear half of the land is the football field with running track.

There is a large cafeteria, and the Glora Thomson library. Thomson (née Lauriston) was a long-term librarian at WDSS. Within that library is the Frank Mann Reference Room, named for a well-known community worker and town historian (born 1896).

The Webber Auditorium, the largest in the town, was named for local agriculturalist Wilifred Webber, who also served on the school's board.

Staff in 1973 included a school nurse. The school had an underground rifle range to the 1980s, and a photographic dark room.

== First Nations ==
Students completing their Walpole Island Elementary School education continue at WDSS. In the mid-1990s, graduation for First Nations students was about 20%, but by mid-2010s had become closer to 75%.

The Harriett Jacobs Center within the school houses the Walpole Island First Nation Secondary School Program, assisting 150+ students.

== Curriculum ==
In the 1980s, WDSS subjects included: Accounting, Art, Auto mechanics, Biology, Chemistry (including advanced), Computer science, Drafting, Electricity, Electronics, English (general, and advanced), Family studies, French, Geography, Geology, History, Machine shop, Marketing, Mathematics, Music, Physical education, Physics (including advanced), Science, Shopwork, Woodworking. School awards at this time included agriculture mechanics, senior secretarial courses, and shorthand. The Grade 13s also took over teaching for a day in 1985.

The school's music programme would periodically combine with Chatham Collegiate Institute (CCI) and Blenheim District High School, and included tours to Halifax, Nova Scotia in the Spring of 1998 as part of the East Coast Music Festival. The programme was disbanded in 2015 when the department head retired.

Partnership with a local business since 2014 has seen practical programmes to develop students including about hospitality, construction, and welding, and two annual scholarships to assist students towards post-secondary education.

The school presently teaches English, French (up to Grade 10), and Ojibwe. In past years, WDSS had taught Spanish (1984).

=== Arts and sciences ===
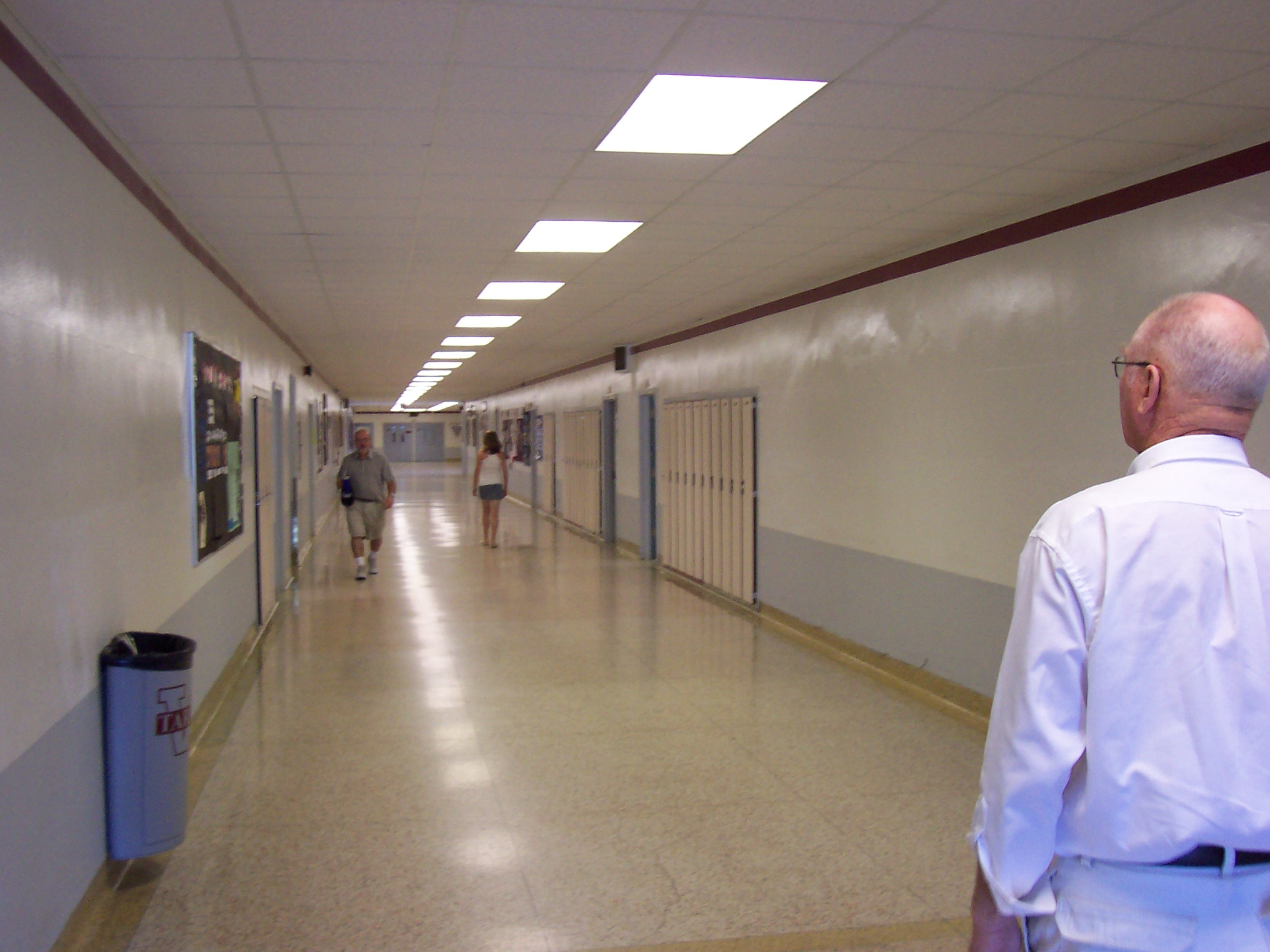
Corridor and lockers (2006)

The formative years under Principal Dickenson (1917–1933) saw the introduction of a literary society, cadet corps, choirs, bands, and other 'enrichment'. With the opening of the new building on Elgin Street in 1950, school drama and musical productions were done at the Hydro Building.

Over the years there have been (end-of-school-years as indicators only):

- activity council (1984, 1985)
- art club (1973, 2024)
- auto boys (1985)
- band
  - junior (1973, 1983, 1984, 1985)
  - senior (1983, 1984, 1985)

The 1974 jazz band called themselves 'Brass with class'

- camera club (1983, 1984, 1985)
- cartography club (1985)
- culture club (1983, 1984, 1985)
- drama club (1968, 1983, 2023, 2024)
- environmental club (2024)
- family studies activities (1985)
- Future elders (2024)
- glee club (1961, 1973)
- Inter-School Christian Fellowship (1983, 1984, 1985)
- newspaper (1983, 1984, 1985)
- pep club (1973/4)
- promotion club (1984)
- Reach for the Top quiz team (1983, 1984, 1985)
- safety team (1984, 1985)
- science club (1983, 1984)
  - Science Olympics (1983, 1985)
- tech crew (1983, 1984, 1985)
- TV crew (1983)
- video society (1983, 1984, 1985).

Some years have seen a school newsletter. In 1975, students used to contribute to the Wallaceburg News 'Tartan Topics' column.

Various musicals have been performed at the school by the student body including Whistlestop (1983), All American (1984), and The Sound of Music (April 1984).

=== Sports ===
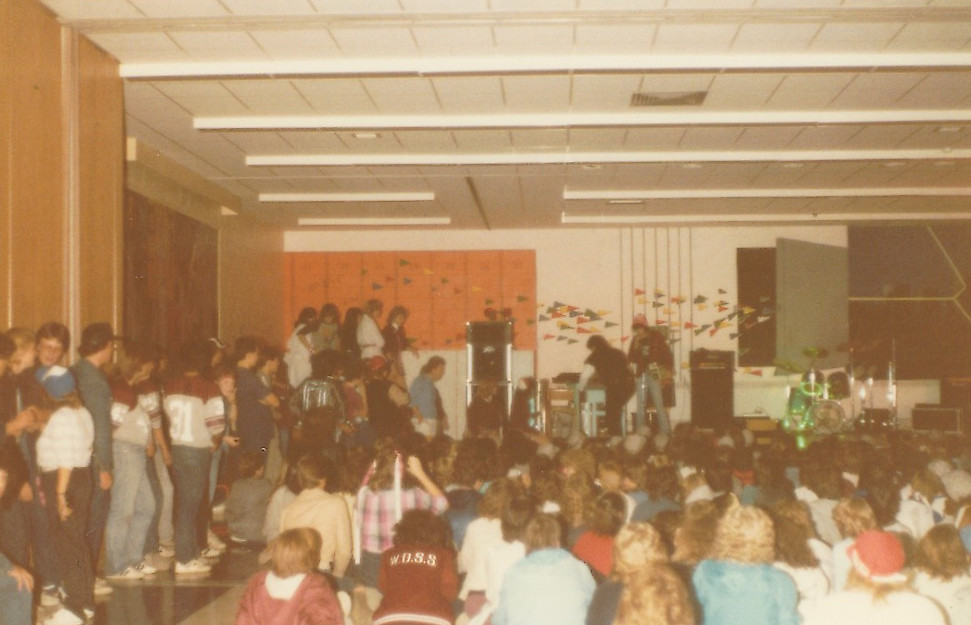
Bronze Boot pep rally (1984)

Related to the town's namesake, Scottish hero William Wallace, the sports teams are named the 'Tartans'.

The interhouse council assists with the student governance activities including with the school houses of Dickenson, Dundas, Laing, and Plewes. Edgar U. Dickenson was the first high school principal (1917–1933), William T. Laing its second (1933–1949). Thomas B. Dundas arrived in 1893 as an educator, becoming principal of a public school, before going on to serve five town mayoral terms.

Over the years there have been (end-of-school-years as indicators only):

- athletic association (Boys' 1973, 1983; Girls' 1973, 1983)
- badminton club (1973, 1983, 1985, 2024)
- baseball (2024)
- basketball (1924, 2024)
  - boys' midget, junior, and senior (1970, 1973, 1983, 1984)
  - girls' midget, junior and senior (1970, 1973, 1984)
  - girls' junior and senior (1983)
  - girls' senior (1985)
- cheerleading (1973, 1983, 1984)
- cross-country ((the 1973 senior boys cross-country team won the Kent AA championship six consecutive seasons: 1983, 1984, 1985)?, 2024)
- curling club (boys and girls) (1970, 1973, 1983, 1985, 2024)
- football Tartans (2024)
  - senior (1983, 1984, 1985)
  - junior (1973, 1983, 1984, 1985)
- golf (2024)
- gymnastics (1973, 1984, 1985)
- hockey (2024)
- intramural sports (2024)
- rifle club (1973)
- soccer (1973, 2024)
  - boys' junior, senior (1983, 1984, 1985)
  - girls' (1983, 1984, 1985)
- swimming (2024)
- tennis (1970, 2024)
- track and field (1983, 1984)
- volleyball (2024)
  - boys' midget, junior, senior (1983, 1984, 1985)
  - girls' midget, junior, senior (1983, 1984, 1985)
- wrestling (1973).

Students have also represented the school at various activities including the 1947 Kent County Track and Field Meet.

In May 2014, WDSS held the annual 'Tinman triathlon', with 260 participants and 70 volunteers.

== Annual events ==
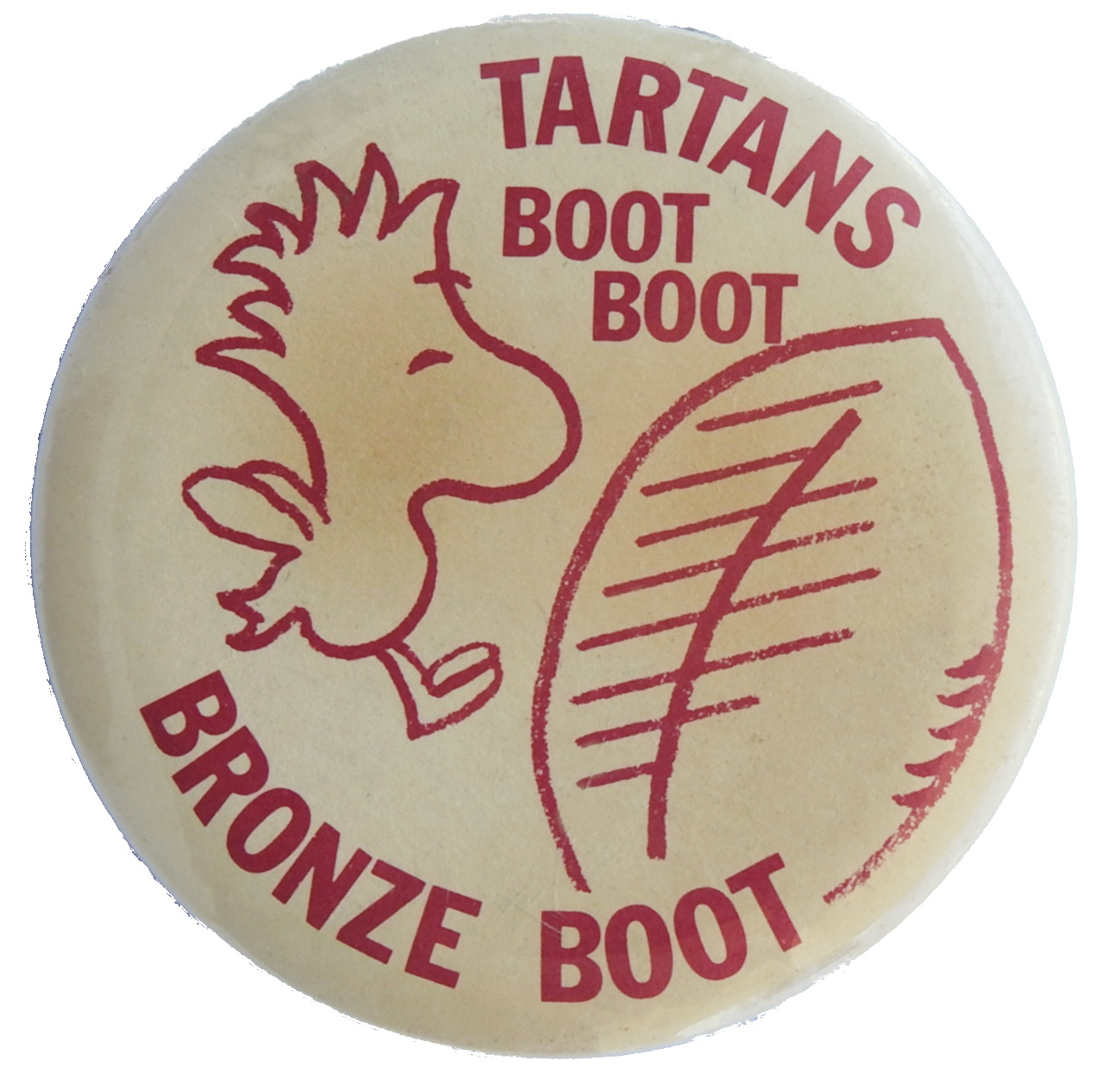
Bronze Boot button (1984)

In the 1980s regular events included Grade Nine Orientation, dress-up days, Christmas Assembly, Indian Feast and Mini Pow Wow, and commencement. Many formals had a theme, such as 'A starry starry night' (1983), 'Four seasons' (Spring 1984), and 'Stairway to Heaven' (Spring 1985).

Bronze Boot is the annual sports week around October or November, commencing with a pep rally, cross-country, Bronze Baton relay, soccer, dance, Miss Tartan Contest, and involving a football game against a rival school. In 1984 as part of the activities, twenty-five Year 9 students were able to be packed into a small car. The trophy was rebuilt by 2010, and now features a bronzed football shoe of former Tartan kicker Shaun Suisham.

== Other involvements ==
Royal Canadian Army Cadets corps were attached to the school from Principal Dickenson's time to at least 1949.

The school has also served the needs of the United Church for two years when the 1914 Trinity Methodist Church was destroyed by fire on 3 February 1978.

In May 2019 the Wallaceburg Concert Band left the school's former music room which had served as their rehearsal space, when the area was to be unexpectedly resumed by the school for unspecified reasons.

== Principals ==
Some past principals include:

Year(s)	Holder	Notes
1917–1933	Edgar U. Dickenson	Later becoming the town's mayor. Died 1942.
1933–1949	William T. Laing	
1950–	W. Clair F. Weir	
<1983 – >1985	Jack O. Glendenning	
2001–2005	Jim Costello	
2014–2016	Rob Lee	
2016–	Murray Hunt	
?2018–2022	Melissa Mallette	
2022–2025	Jeremy Gower	
2025–	Tiffany Cadotte	A previous teacher at the school.

== Notable alumni ==
- Marian Coveny (1954–2022), first captain of the Canada women's national ice hockey team.
- Ralph Murphy (1944–2019), Canadian Country Music Hall of Fame inductee
- Stef Sanjati (born 1995), fashion blogger, social activist
- Shaun Suisham (born 1981), former NFL player

== See also ==
- Education in Ontario
- List of secondary schools in Ontario
