= Aubrey Scotto =

American film director

- Born: August 21, 1895; Los Angeles, California, United States
- Died: June 24, 1953; Los Angeles, California
- Occupation(s): Film director, writer, film editor

Aubrey H. Scotto (August 21, 1895 – June 24, 1953) was an American film director, writer and film editor.

Born in Los Angeles and active in films from 1929, Scotto graduated from directing short subjects to Republic Pictures features in 1933.

== Personal life ==
In January 1941, Scotto was one of several men named in divorce proceedings, accused of "committing improper acts" with Marion Talley. He had directed her in the 1936 film Follow Your Heart. Scotto was married at the time to Florida socialite Natalie H. Scotto, but his relationship with Talley was cited in the divorce suit against him in March 1941. By October 1948, he had been married four times.

== Selected films ==
- The Viking, 1928 (editor)
- Musical Justice, 1931 short subject featuring Rudy Vallée, Mae Questel as Betty Boop and Victor Young (director)
- Rhapsody in Black and Blue, 1932 short subject featuring Louis Armstrong (director)
- The Divorce Racket (1932) (director)
- Uncle Moses, 1932 (director)
- 1,000 Dollars a Minute, 1935 (director)
- Smart Girl, 1935 (director)
- Private Worlds, 1935 (editor)
- Hitch Hike Lady, 1935 (director)
- Follow Your Heart, 1936 (director)
- Ticket to Paradise, 1936 (director)
- Blazing Barriers, 1937 (director)
- I Was a Convict, 1939 (director)
