= Wallaceburg Antique Motor and Boat Outing =

Annual summer festival in Canada

Wallaceburg Antique Motor and Boat Outing WAMBO
- Genre: Antique motor and boat festival
- Frequency: Annual (second weekend of August)
- Locations: Wallaceburg, Ontario, Canada
- Coordinates: 42.59378°N 82.3849°W
- Years active: 1988–present
- Founders: Donald "Chip" Gordon
- Attendance: ~30,000

The Wallaceburg Antique Motor and Boat Outing (WAMBO) in Wallaceburg, Ontario, Canada, is an annual summer festival of antique, classic, and specialty vehicles. With its access to Lake Saint Clair and the Great Lakes, the large Sydenham River goes through the centre of the town, facilitating many boat moorings.

== History ==
Started in 1988, the festival takes place on the second weekend of August every year, attracting approximately 30,000 visitors to see antique boats, cars, motorcycles, airplanes, fire trucks, tractors, and other various antique vehicles. Initiated in part by former town councillor Donald 'Chip' Gordon (c. 1947–2012), he had a vision of revitalising the bustling Wallaceburg downtown area. WAMBO now provides a temporary boost to the local economy. The name itself was styled along with a popular action movie at the time, Rambo.

Gordon stated he had done a deal to keep the rain away; the event to 2016 only experiencing one wash-out on a Saturday in 2009.

Economic reasons including higher fuel prices saw boat numbers reduce from the mid-1990s with over 100 boats in the Sydenham basin, to 83 in 2006, and an expected thirty in 2013.

== Activities ==
Admission fees to attendees are not charged, with festival costs met by local businesses, sponsorships, and donations.

In addition to antique vehicle exhibitions, WAMBO also includes a number of other significant events: A car dream cruise, soap box races, a toy show, art in the park, live bands, food vendors, art and craft vendors, pioneer crafts at the museum, camping in Crothers Park, and free admission to the Wallaceburg and District Museum. Live entertainment has included an Eagles tribute band (2013), and a Supertramp tribute band (2022). A regular function is a large interdenominational church service on Sunday, under what was a few hours earlier the large beer tent.

After ringing of the bell, the events usually commence with the Terry Glover Memorial Cruise procession of classic cars. The cruise commenced in 2002 and named after Glover who was a long-time volunteer to WAMBO (he died in 2006). In 2013 another activity was added to the list, creating a boat made of cardboard and duct tape.

A lawn mower race commenced in 2002, absent during some intermittent periods, and was again held at the 2016 WAMBO.

The twenty-fifth WAMBO (Friday 9 August to Sunday 11 August 2013) would see the bell rung twenty-five times, was expected to draw a crowd of 30,000 persons, and thirty-five fire trucks participating.

Due to the COVID-19 pandemic in 2020, WAMBO was cancelled for the first time in the festival's history. WAMBO 2021 was scaled down and held from 8 to 9 October with 155 cars down the downtown streets, and the year's final farmers market. WAMBO 2022 saw a return to the full festival, with over 260 registered vehicles.

The thirty-seventh WAMBO (Friday 8 August to Sunday 10 August 2025), held in conjunction to the town's 150th celebrations and concert, saw about 200 motor vehicles on display (up from 160 the year before). The 2025 festival was preceded by a large '3Rivers Roll' bicycling event, which had commenced in 2017.
