= Marion Talley =

American opera singer

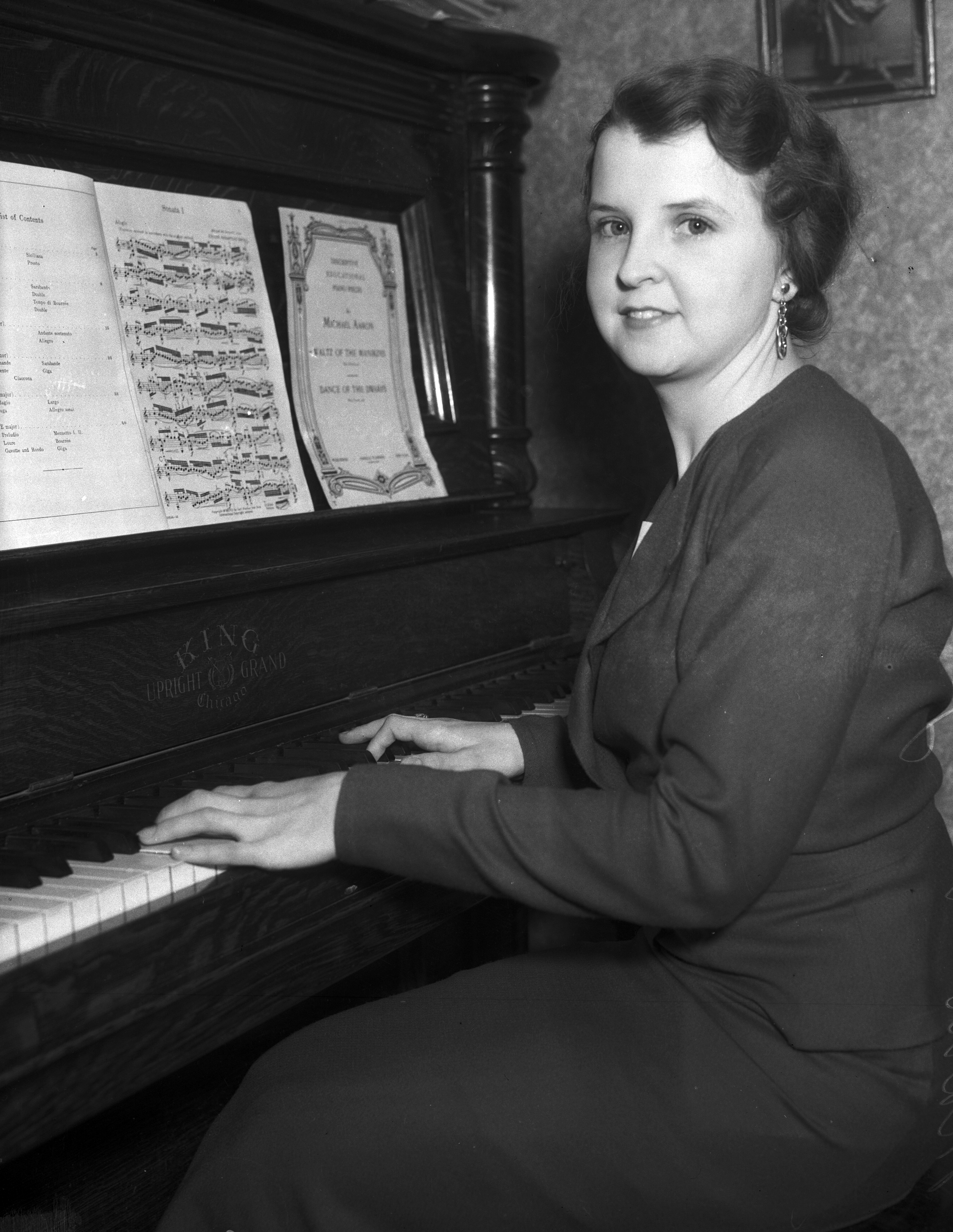
Marion Talley in 1933

Marion Nevada Talley (December 20, 1906 – January 3, 1983) was an American operatic lyric coloratura soprano. She was at the time (1926) the youngest prima donna to have made a debut at the Metropolitan Opera; her swift rise to fame was followed by a period of decline, although she remained in the public eye for a number of years.

== Early life ==
Marion Nevada Talley was born in Nevada, Missouri, the daughter of Charles Marion Talley, a telegraph operator for Missouri Pacific Railroad, and Helen H. (Brown) Talley. She grew up in Kansas City, Missouri after her father was transferred there when she was a baby. At an early age she was taking piano, violin, and voice lessons, singing with church choirs, and growing a reputation among local music critics and audiences.

At the age of fifteen, Talley appeared in a 1922 Kansas City Grand Opera Company production of Mignon by Ambroise Thomas, and was a local sensation. Her career became a cause célèbre for the citizens of Kansas City, who attended benefit concerts and contributed money for her to study in New York, under the famed teacher Frank LaForge, and later in Italy. She unsuccessfully auditioned for the Metropolitan Opera in 1923.

== Career ==
The Metropolitan Opera's general manager, Giulio Gatti-Casazza, hired Talley for the 1925/26 season. On February 17, 1926, she made her debut there as Gilda, the daughter of the title character in Giuseppe Verdi's Rigoletto. At the age of nineteen, she was the youngest prima donna to sing at the Metropolitan Opera at that time. (Patrice Munsel would perform there at age eighteen in 1943.) Her pending debut caused a media sensation, contrary to Gatti-Casazza's hopes that it would remain low-key. A delegation of two hundred leading citizens of Kansas City, including Mayor Albert I. Beach, arrived via a special train. Tickets were being resold at astronomical prices. A telegraph was set up backstage so her father could send dispatches to the Associated Press. Her performance prompted multiple ovations from the crowd, but critics were less enthusiastic. While they thought her debut promising, it did not live up to the expectations caused by the media frenzy.

That year featured two other Talley debuts. Two days later, she made her radio debut singing "Home! Sweet Home!" She also appeared in the first publicly exhibited shorts featuring the Vitaphone sound film, which premiered on Broadway on August 6, along with the first Vitaphone feature-length film, Don Juan starring John Barrymore. The short films preceding the feature were a collection of musical performances featuring Talley along with a number of other classical and opera musicians including Henry Hadley conducting the New York Philharmonic, Mischa Elman, Josef Bonime, Efrem Zimbalist, Harold Bauer, Giovanni Martinelli, and Anna Case and Hawaiian guitarist Roy Smeck. Talley performed "Caro nome" from Rigoletto. Negative reviews of the Vitaphone premiere focused mainly on Talley, criticizing her inexperience as a performer and her lack of photogenic qualities. In 1927, she would appear in another Vitaphone short film, performing "Bella figlia dell'amore", the quartet from Rigoletto. along with Jeanne Gordon, Beniamino Gigli, and Giuseppe de Luca.

Talley spent four seasons with the Metropolitan Opera and appeared in seventy-six performances of seven operas, as well as in eight concerts where she performed alongside other Met artists, for a total of eighty-four performances. Besides her debut role of Gilda, her other Met roles were the title role in Lucia di Lammermoor by Gaetano Donizetti, the title role in Le rossignol by Igor Stravinsky, Olympia in Jacques Offenbach's Les contes d'Hoffmann, the Queen of the Night in The Magic Flute by Wolfgang Amadeus Mozart, Philine in Ambroise Thomas' Mignon, and the Queen of Shemakha in Rimsky-Korsakov's The Golden Cockerel.

== Later life and marriages ==
Talley claimed that she would retire to a farm in Kansas, but she attempted to resurrect her career in several ways. She went on concert tours and spent some time at the Chicago Opera. From 1936 to 1938, she had her own program on NBC Radio. It was sponsored by Ry-Krisp and she appeared in many of their advertisements. She moved to Los Angeles to pursue a career in motion pictures, but she starred in only one film, Follow Your Heart (1936), a musical from Republic Pictures. Soon she permanently retired from show business.

Talley was married twice. In 1932, she married German pianist Michael Raucheisen, but the marriage was annulled after a few months. In 1935, she married music critic and voice teacher Adolf Eckstrom. That marriage ended with a lengthy custody battle over their daughter Susan, during which Talley was forced to admit on the witness stand that her daughter was born out of wedlock. Both marriages received much media publicity.

Marion Nevada Talley died on January 3, 1983, in Beverly Hills, California. Talley is buried at Westwood Memorial Park, Los Angeles, California.
