= David Corrente =

Canadian baseball player (born 1983)

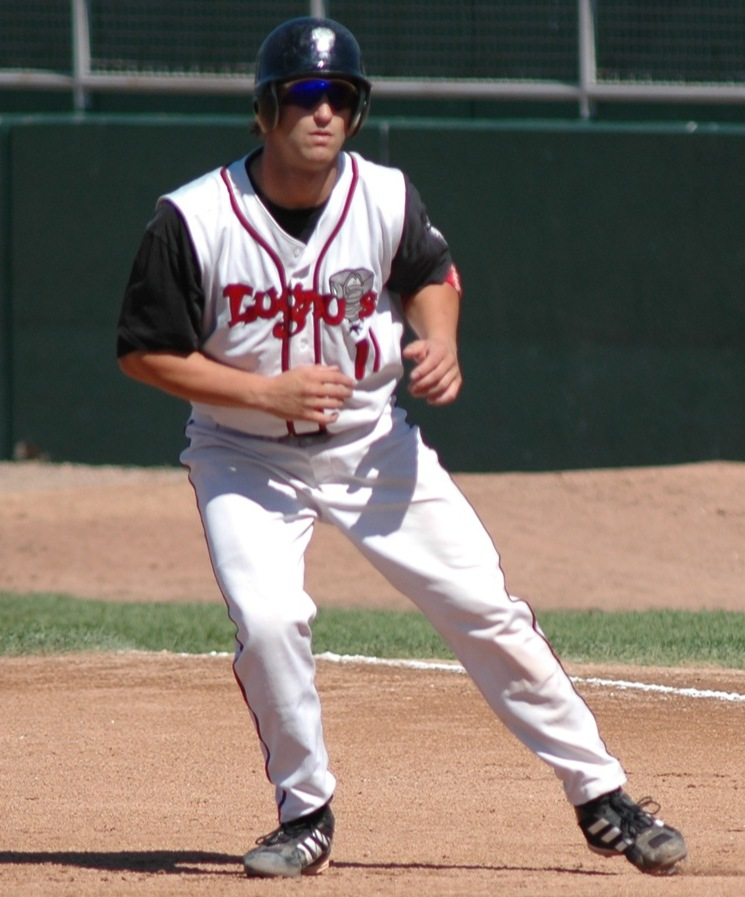
- Corrente with the Lansing Lugnuts in 2005
- Catcher
- Born: October 13, 1983 (age 42); Wallaceburg, Ontario, Canada
- Bats: Right Throws: Right
- Stats at Baseball Reference

David Ross Corrente (born October 13, 1983, in Wallaceburg, Ontario, Canada) is a former Minor League Baseball catcher. Corrente played in the minor leagues from 2001 to 2008 and played for Team Canada in the 2008 Summer Olympics.

Corrente was drafted by the Toronto Blue Jays in the 14th round of the 2001 Major League Baseball draft. He played in the Blue Jays minor league system from 2001 to 2008 as a catcher. Corrente was a .238 career minor league hitter, and had 252 hits in 1228 at bats.
