= Hitch Hike Lady =

1935 film by Aubrey Scotto

- Theatrical release poster
- Directed by: Aubrey Scotto
- Screenplay by: Gordon Rigby; Lester Cole
- Story by: Wallace MacDonald
- Produced by: Nat Levine
- Starring: Alison Skipworth; Mae Clarke; Arthur Treacher; James Ellison; Warren Hymer; Beryl Mercer
- Cinematography: Jack A. Marta; Ernest Miller
- Edited by: Ray Curtiss
- Music by: Arthur Kay
- Production company: Republic Pictures
- Distributed by: Republic Pictures
- Release date: December 28, 1935
- Running time: 74 minutes
- Country: United States
- Language: English

Hitch Hike Lady is a 1935 American comedy film directed by Aubrey Scotto and written by Gordon Rigby and Lester Cole. The film stars Alison Skipworth, Mae Clarke, Arthur Treacher, James Ellison, Warren Hymer and Beryl Mercer. The film was released on December 28, 1935, by Republic Pictures.

In the United Kingdom it was released with the title Eventful Journey.

== Plot ==
Mrs. Amelia Blake, an elderly woman living in Kent, England has an adult son who lives in the United States and writes regularly from “Rancho San Quentin”. He promises that he will send for her when he establishes his business. Mrs. Blake unexpectedly receives a £100 inheritance and decides to surprise her son by travelling to visit him. Her ship arrives in New York and when enquiring how to reach California, she learns that it’s a distance of over 3000 miles.

Most of her money has been spent so she accepts an offer from a man who says he is driving to California, and for a fee she can join him. She befriends another passenger, Judy, and when they stop overnight at a motel, they meet Jimmy, a travelling salesman of trailer homes. Mrs. Blake tells them about her son and his letters from “San Quentin”; they both realize he is a prison inmate, but to spare Mrs. Blake, they don’t divulge the truth. In the morning Mrs. Blake and Judy discover they have been swindled by the driver, who has taken their money and abandoned them, and Jimmy has also left. They begin hitch hiking and after a few days, they stop a car pulling a trailer and discover it is Jimmy, who invites them to join him. They drive for some distance, and when they stop, Jimmy opens the trailer to discover two con men, Mortimer Wingate and Cluck Regan, have been travelling in the trailer.

Jimmy orders them to leave, but Mrs. Blake asks if she may sleep in the trailer and without Jimmy noticing, beckons the con men to join her. Hours pass and as they drive through the night, the trailer becomes uncoupled and eventually comes to rest in a farm worker’s campsite. Mortimer takes advantage of the situation and conducts a raffle with the trailer as the prize. He and Cluck plan on leaving with the proceeds but are caught as Jimmy and Judy return for the trailer.

Circumstances force the group to remain together and Mrs. Blake offers some support to the con men, who appreciate her kindness. The group runs out of money and when they reach the next town, Mrs. Blake sends a wire to her son asking for money. Jimmy is able to sell a trailer and the con men also raise some funds. Each of them give Mrs. Blake a sum of money and each tell her that it is from her son.

Jimmy and Judy grow closer and Jimmy asks her to marry him. She accepts, but that night Mortimer tells Jimmy that he has a plan to help Mrs. Blake. The next morning the women discover that the men have abandoned them and they resume hitch hiking. Mortimer receives a large payment through an orange eating contest that he has been promoting, while Jimmy and Cluck meet with the prison warden and governor, and explain that Jimmy wishes to report Cluck and hand him over to collect a bounty that the State of California has on him. The governor is so moved that Cluck would sacrifice himself to help Mrs. Blake that he agrees to release her son from prison and waive the short amount of time Cluck would have been required to serve.

The police are called in to find the two women as they continue hitch hiking, and during this time the men use the money they’ve collected to set up a ranch nearby. Mrs. Blake and Judy are found by the police and driven to the ranch where Jimmy, Mortimer, Cluck and Mrs. Blake’s son are waiting.

The film ends with the mother and son embracing, and Jimmy and Judy discussing their honeymoon. Mortimer and Cluck comment that there are bounties in other states for Cluck, and they set off together.

== Cast ==
- Alison Skipworth as Mrs. Amelia Blake
- Mae Clarke as Judith Martin
- Arthur Treacher as Mortimer Wingate
- James Ellison as Jimmy Peyton
- Warren Hymer as Cluck Regan
- Beryl Mercer as Mrs. Bayne
- J. Farrell MacDonald as Judge Hale
- Christian Rub as Farmer
- Harold Waldridge as Oswald Brown
- Irving Bacon as Ed Simpson
- Lionel Belmore as Mr. Harker
- George "Gabby" Hayes as Miner
- Dell Henderson as Williams
- Clay Clement as Warden
- Ward Bond as Motorcycle Officer
- Otis Harlan as Mayor Loomis
- Charles C. Wilson as Mike

== Critical reception ==
Variety described it as "the best effort from Republic for some time", and wrote that it had "an intriguing plot, with happy intermingling of humor and heart tugs." Alison Skipworth and Mae Clarke were complimented on their "polished" performances, with the review also commenting, "Arthur Treacher …. is tops in his role" and "Jimmy Ellison, young newcomer on the Hollywood scene, contributes probably his best effort to date."

Motion Picture Herald described the film as a "family type attraction" that moves "to a fairly fast tempo." It commented, "While there is nothing new or novel to the hitch-hike premise, the manner in which it is presented here carries an atmosphere of refreshing difference, as the factors of comedy, romance, action and deception are capably merged in dialogue and action."

Picturegoer’s Lionel Collier wrote : "Alison Skipworth is the standby of this amusing and human little comedy …. There is an incidental romance which is also delightfully introduced." In discussing the performances, he wrote, "Arthur Treacher as a confidence man and Warren Hymer as a gangster are very funny and the romantic interest is well sustained by Mae Clarke and Jimmy Ellison."
