= CKXS-FM =

Radio station in Wallaceburg, Ontario

Coordinates: 42°37′38″N 82°18′28″W

- Wallaceburg, Ontario; Canada
- Frequency: 99.1 MHz
- Branding: 99.1 CKXS

Programming
- Format: Variety hits

Ownership
- Owner: Five Amigos Broadcasting

History
- First air date: October 20, 2009

Technical information
- Class: A
- ERP: 1 kW average 3 kW peak
- HAAT: 84.8 metres (278 ft)

Links
- Website: ckxsfm.com

CKXS-FM is a Canadian radio station that broadcasts a variety hits format on 99.1 MHz in Wallaceburg, Ontario. The station is branded as 99.1 CKXS.

Owned by Five Amigos Broadcasting Inc., the station was authorized on May 26, 2009.

Long-time local morning man Greg Hetherington is also the principal owner of CKXS.

CKXS is a popular station with customers in the United States the border also. The core American listeners being around Algonac, Michigan. To cater to the listeners, some weather is given in fahrenheit as well as celsius.

The station launched on October 20, 2009 at 9:00 a.m. EDT.
