= $1,000 a Minute =

1935 film

1,000 Dollars a Minute
- Film poster
- Directed by: Aubrey Scotto
- Written by: Everett Freeman; Claire Church; Jack Natteford
- Produced by: Nat Levine
- Starring: Roger Pryor
- Cinematography: Jack A. Marta
- Edited by: Ray Curtiss
- Distributed by: Republic Pictures (I)
- Release date: October 22, 1935
- Running time: 70 minutes
- Country: United States
- Language: English

$1,000 a Minute is a 1935 American comedy film directed by Aubrey Scotto and starring Roger Pryor and Leila Hyams. The film was released on October 22, 1935. It was nominated for an Academy Award in the Best Sound Recording category.

== Plot ==
A broken and penniless newspaperman participates in an experiment in which two crazy millionaires are offering a prize of $10,000 to anyone who can spend $1,000 a minute, every minute, for 12 hours straight.

== Cast ==
- Roger Pryor as Wally Jones
- Leila Hyams as Dorothy Summers
- Edward Brophy as Benny Dolan
- Sterling Holloway as Pete
- Edgar Kennedy as Police Officer McCarthy
- Purnell Pratt as Charlie, the Editor
- Herman Bing as Vanderbrocken
- Arthur Hoyt as Jewel clerk
- William Austin as Salesman
- Franklin Pangborn as Reville
- George Hayes as New Deal Watson
- Morgan Wallace as Big Jim Bradley
- Claude King as Robinson

== Reception ==
In a contemporary review for The New York Times, critic Andre Sennwald wrote: "This fanciful situation is a setup for cinema farce and '$1,000 a Minute' races busily along, picking up its laughs on the run. Stemming from a short story, the enterprise suffers the natural hazard of sustaining the idea over a distance, and the adapters are not overly successful in their efforts to pad it to the requirements of a full-length motion picture. The film has a tendency to work down instead of up to a climax, and toward the end it thins out pretty rapidly. But it makes for good, unpretentious fun, and it contains more honest laughter than you will find in many more elaborate screen entertainments."
