= Josephine Whittell =

American actress

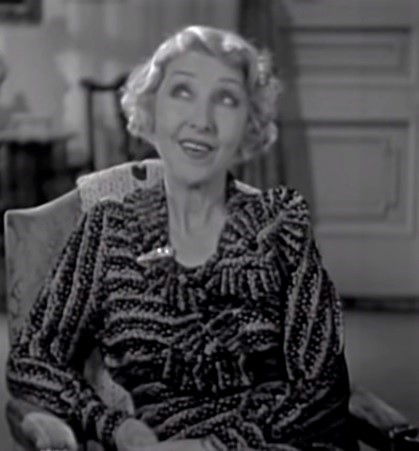
- Whittell in Follow Your Heart (1936)
- Born: Josephine Cunningham; November 30, 1883; San Francisco, California, U.S.
- Died: June 1, 1961 (aged 77); Los Angeles, California, U.S.
- Resting place: Chapel of the Pines Crematory, Los Angeles, California, U.S.
- Occupation: Actress
- Years active: 1916–1959
- Spouse(s): George Whittell Jr. (1904-1906; div.); Robert Warwick (m. 1910; div. 19??)

Josephine Whittell (born Josephine Cunningham; November 30, 1883 – June 1, 1961) was an American character actress of silent and sound films.

== Early years ==
Whittell was born on November 30, 1883, in San Francisco, California to Charles and Susan Cunningham.

== Career ==
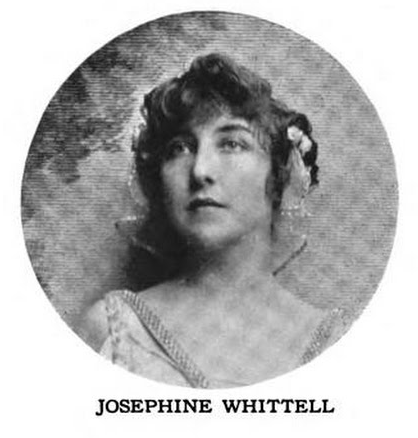
Josephine Whittell from a 1916 publication.

Early in her career, Whittell performed as a chorus girl in Anna Held's theatrical company.

Whittell began her film career during the silent era, debuting in a featured role in 1917's Alimony. She appeared in four silent films between 1917 and 1921, before taking a hiatus from the film industry. In 1931 Whittell returned to films, with supporting roles in two Wheeler and Woolsey comedies, Caught Plastered and Peach O'Reno. During her 43-year career, she appeared in more than 70 films. In the early 1930s, she appeared frequently as the older seductress in films before the enactment of the film code in the mid-1930s.

Whittell appeared in many notable films, either in supporting or small roles. Some of those films include: Stage Door (1938), starring Katharine Hepburn, Ginger Rogers, and Adolphe Menjou; 1939's The Women, with Norma Shearer, Joan Crawford, and Rosalind Russell; the 1945 version of State Fair, starring Jeanne Crain and Dana Andrews; King Vidor's The Fountainhead, the film version of the Ayn Rand novel of the same name, starring Gary Cooper and Patricia Neal; the musical, In the Good Old Summertime, with Judy Garland and Van Johnson; George Stevens' A Place in the Sun, starring Montgomery Clift, Elizabeth Taylor and Shelley Winters; the Cecil B. De Mille epic, The Greatest Show on Earth; and the 1954 version of A Star is Born, directed by George Cukor, and starring Garland and James Mason.

She remained active in films until late in life, making her last appearance in 1959's The Buccaneer, directed by Anthony Quinn (his only directing credit).

== Personal life ==
In May 1904, Josephine Cunningham's purported engagement to George Whittell Jr. was a subject of dispute. She and her mother said that a diamond ring was evidence of the engagement. Meanwhile, George Whittell Sr. denied any engagement. On June 2, 1904, they were married in Jersey City, New Jersey. She filed for divorce two years later. Whittell married, secondly, to actor Robert Warwick in 1910. When she acted on stage and he worked in films, they lived in New York and California, respectively, and visited each other occasionally.

== Death ==
On June 1, 1961, Whittell died in Hollywood, California, at age 77.

== Filmography ==
- Alimony (1917)
- The Climbers (1919)
- Marie, Ltd. (1919)
- The Inner Chamber (1921)
- Caught Plastered (1931)
- Peach O'Reno (1931)
- Symphony of Six Million (1932)
- What Price Hollywood? (1932)
- Infernal Machine (1933)
- It's a Gift (1934)
- The Life of Vergie Winters (1934)
- Servants' Entrance (1934)
- Jealousy (1934)
- Love Time (1934)
- Mills of the Gods (1934)
- Under Pressure (1935)
- Redheads on Parade (1935)
- Shanghai (1935)
- Follow Your Heart (1936)
- Easy to Take (1936)
- Beware of Ladies (1936)
- Beg, Borrow or Steal (1937)
- Hotel Haywire (1937)
- Stage Door (1937)
- Married Before Breakfast (1937)
- Larceny on the Air (1937)
- Double Wedding (1937)
- Blondie (1938)
- Too Hot to Handle (1938)
- Women Are Like That (1938)
- Lucky Night (1939)
- The Women (1939)
- Boy Trouble (1939)
- Tugboat Annie Sails Again (1940)
- Glamour Boy (1941)
- Life with Henry (1941)
- Unfinished Business (1941)
- Ziegfeld Girl (1941)
- Lady in a Jam (1942)
- The Magnificent Dope (1942)
- Dixie (1943)
- Standing Room Only (1944)
- The Enchanted Cottage (1945)
- Having Wonderful Crime (1945)
- State Fair (1945)
- Life with Blondie (1945)
- Affairs of Geraldine (1946)
- Easy to Wed (1946)
- Rendezvous with Annie (1946)
- That Brennan Girl (1946)
- The Virginian (1946)
- The Devil Thumbs a Ride (1947)
- The Shocking Miss Pilgrim (1947)
- Song of Love (1947)
- One Touch of Venus (1948)
- Sitting Pretty (1948)
- Train to Alcatraz (1948)
- The Accused (1949)
- Adventure in Baltimore (1949)
- Chinatown at Midnight (1949)
- The Fountainhead (1949)
- In the Good Old Summertime (1949)
- The Lady Takes a Sailor (1949)
- Chinatown at Midnight (1950)
- Shakedown (1950)
- Molly (1951)
- Here Comes the Groom (1951)
- A Place in the Sun (1951) - Margaret - Eastman's Secretary (uncredited)
- Too Young to Kiss (1951)
- The Greatest Show on Earth (1952)
- Forever Female (1954)
- A Star Is Born (1954)
- The Search for Bridey Murphy (1956)
- The Buccaneer (1959)
