= Wallaceburg =

Town in south-west Ontario, Canada

Wallaceburg, Ontario
- Unincorporated community
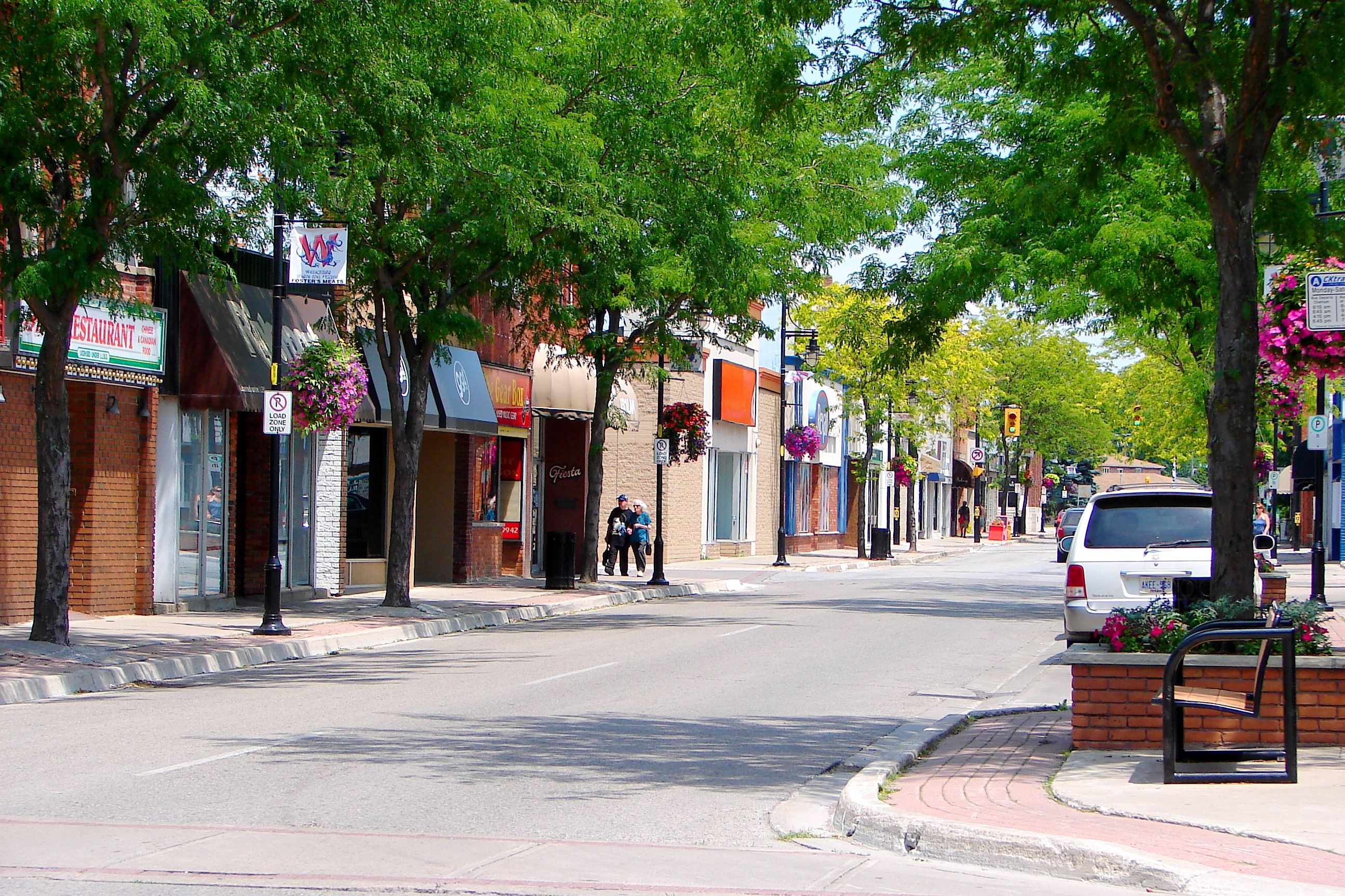

- Location within Municipality of Chatham-Kent Location within Southern Ontario
- Coordinates: 42°35′41″N 82°23′03″W
- Country: Canada
- Province: Ontario
- Municipality: Chatham-Kent

Government
  - Governing body: Chatham-Kent Municipal Council
  - MPs: Bev Shipley (CPC); Dave Van Kesteren (CPC)
  - MPPs: Rick Nicholls (OPC); Monte McNaughton (OPC)

Area
  - Land: 8.84 km^{2} (3.41 sq mi)
- Elevation: 198 m (650 ft)

Population (2021)
  - Total: 10,323
  - Density: 1,167.4/km^{2} (3,024/sq mi)
- Time zone: UTC-5 (EST)
  - Summer (DST): UTC-4 (EDT)
- Forward sortation area: N8A
- Area codes: 519 and 226
- NTS Map: 040J09
- GNBC Code: FDATX
- Website: wallaceburg.ca

Wallaceburg (2021 population 10,323) is an unincorporated community in the municipality of Chatham-Kent in Southern (Southwestern) Ontario, Canada. Originally a small settlement, it was recognized for its significant contribution to the lumber and boat building industries and strategic location along the banks of the scenic Sydenham River. In more recent years (1895–1999) the town was known for its glass-making industry. For that reason, Wallaceburg is locally known as the "glass town of Canada".

Wallaceburg is the home of Wallaceburg Antique Motor and Boat Outing (WAMBO), an annual antique car, boat, bus, and fire truck show that began in 1988.

== History ==
The town was founded in the early 19th century and named after Scotland's national hero, Sir William Wallace. It was incorporated as a village in 1875 and then as a town in 1896. In 1998, it was amalgamated into the new municipality of Chatham–Kent.

=== The Baldoon settlement ===
The first settlers to the Wallaceburg area came in 1804. They initially settled along the Snye River at a location they called the Baldoon Settlement. Thomas Douglas, 5th Earl of Selkirk, provided an opportunity for poor farmers and peasants from Kirkcudbrightshire, Scotland to come to what is now known as Wallaceburg to build better lives for themselves. He is often considered a great philanthropist for his efforts working with his poor countrymen. Unfortunately, the early Baldoon settlers faced a plethora of difficulties: malaria, harsh winters, marshland, lack of food, and American invaders during the War of 1812. By the 1820s, the settlement was deemed a failure by Lord Selkirk and other interested parties. The Baldoon settlers, however, did not give up; many of them contributed to the early success and development of the town of Wallaceburg.

Census	Population
1871	600
1881	1,625
1891	2,726
1901	2,763
1911	3,438
1921	4,006
1931	4,326
1941	4,986
1951	7,688
1961	7,881
1971	10,550
1981	11,506
1991	11,846
2001	11,114
2006	10,703
2011	10,127
2016	10,098
2021	10,323

=== The Baldoon mystery ===
The Baldoon Mystery is one of Ontario's greatest haunting stories, handed down by word of mouth. The strange events of this case are alleged to have occurred between 1829 and 1840, within a few kilometres of Wallaceburg, Ontario.

=== Industrial history ===
The town's first major industry was the lumber trade. It was highly successful during the mid- to late 19th century. The most notable business that developed during this era was the Wallaceburg Cooperage Company. It was opened by David Alexander Gordon and his uncle Captain James Steinhoff in 1887. By the end of the 19th century it was difficult to make large profits off of a declining hardwood supply. Industrialists needed to find other business ideas to sustain the local economy.

When historians think of Wallaceburg they often remember its three major modern industries: glass, brass, and sugar. In 1894 the Sydenham Glass Company began. The glassmaking industry in Wallaceburg lasted over 100 years. The factory closed in 1999. This left approximately 1000 workers unemployed.

Another notable industry was the Dominion Sugar Company. It was opened in 1901, and merged in 1930 with another company. The company was known for producing raw sugar from sugar beets. The business in Wallaceburg closed in 1960.

The Wallaceburg Brass Company was the third staple industry. It opened in 1905 and was famous for creating brass faucets and plumbing supplies. The company later merged with Kindred industries, founded by Robbert Hartog, and was known thereafter as known as Waltec. The factory stopped manufacturing in Wallaceburg as late as 2006.

=== The Lee rifle prototype ===
In 1878, James Paris Lee (1832–1904) and his brother John perfected a rifle with a box magazine in Wallaceburg. This rifle later became an antecedent to the famous Lee–Enfield rifle. A well-trained person could fire approximately 15 to 30 shots a minute. The prototype was tested successfully in Wallaceburg and is currently housed at the Wallaceburg and District Museum.

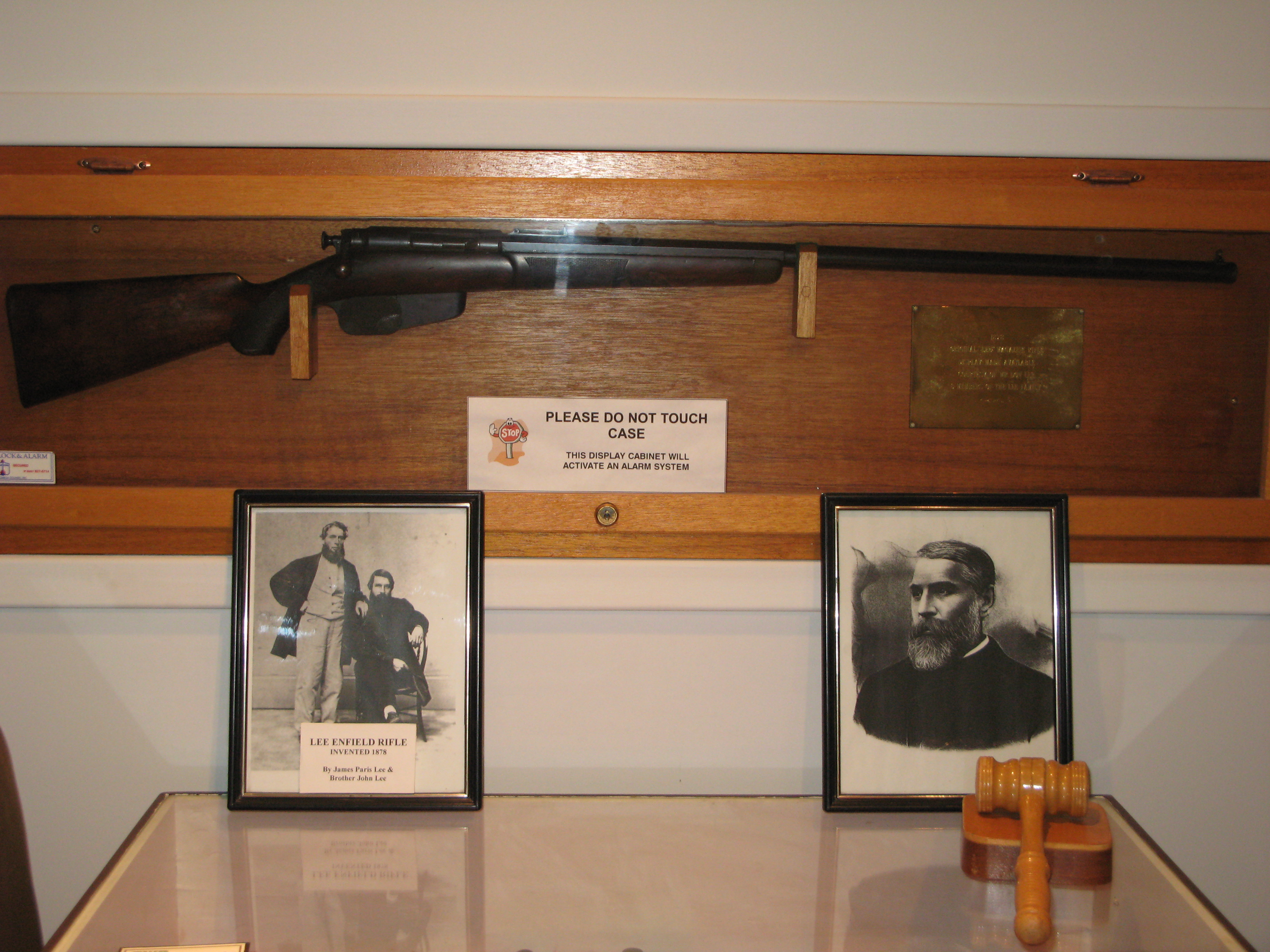
Lee Rifle prototype, 1878

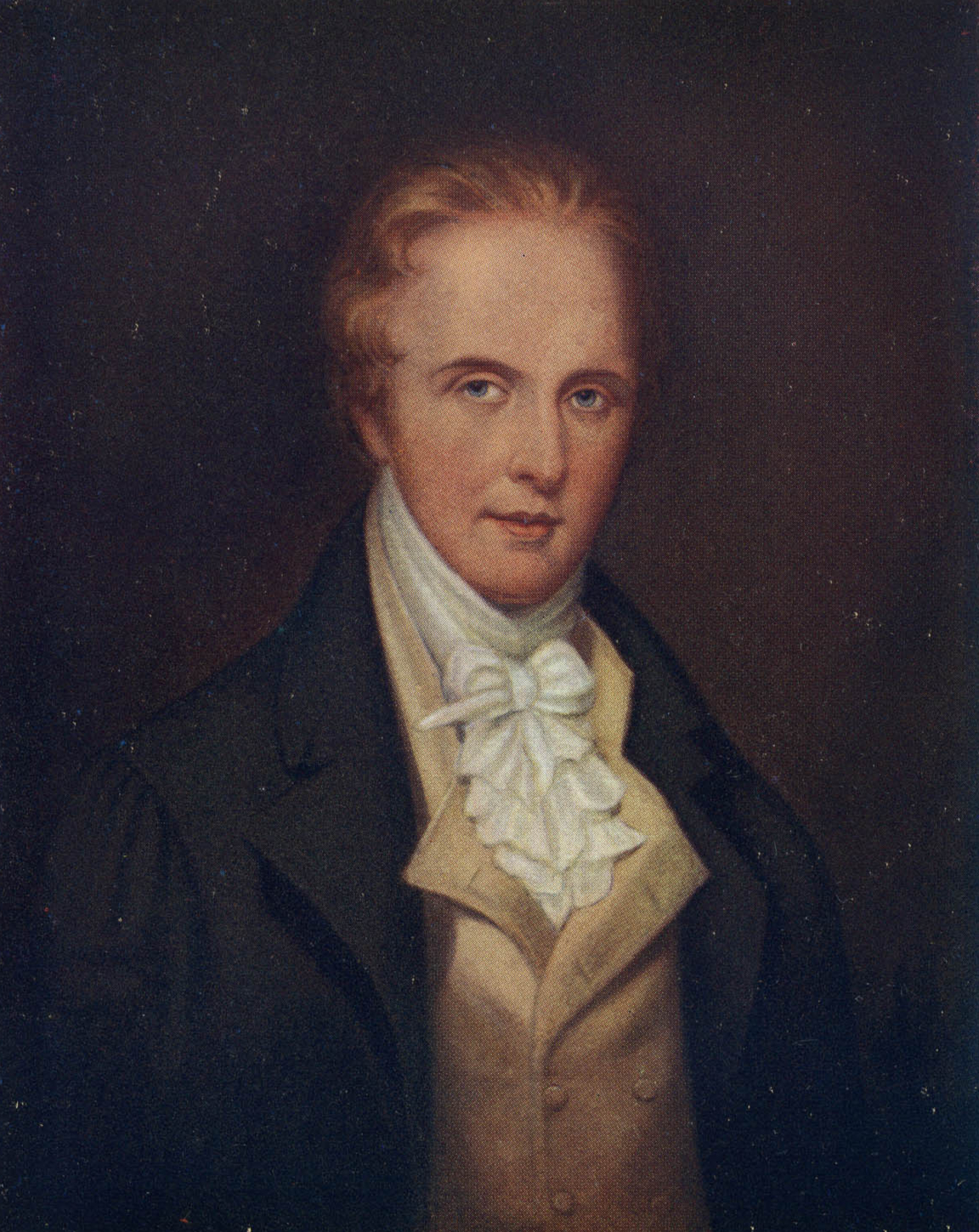
Thomas Douglas, 5th Earl of Selkirk

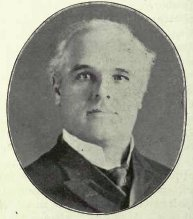
David Alexander Gordon

== Tourist attractions ==
Wallaceburg is home to a number attractions and yearly events. Tourists come to Wallaceburg to experience fishing, hunting, golf, and pleasure boating. Fishers enjoy a variety of species, including bass, walleye, perch, pike, muskie, trout, and panfish. Hunters take pleasure in searching for the area's abundant population of water fowl, deer, and rabbits. Boaters enjoy a vast array of rivers and lakes. There is still water for knee boarders and wake boarders. There is also open water nearby for those who enjoy sailing and scuba diving.

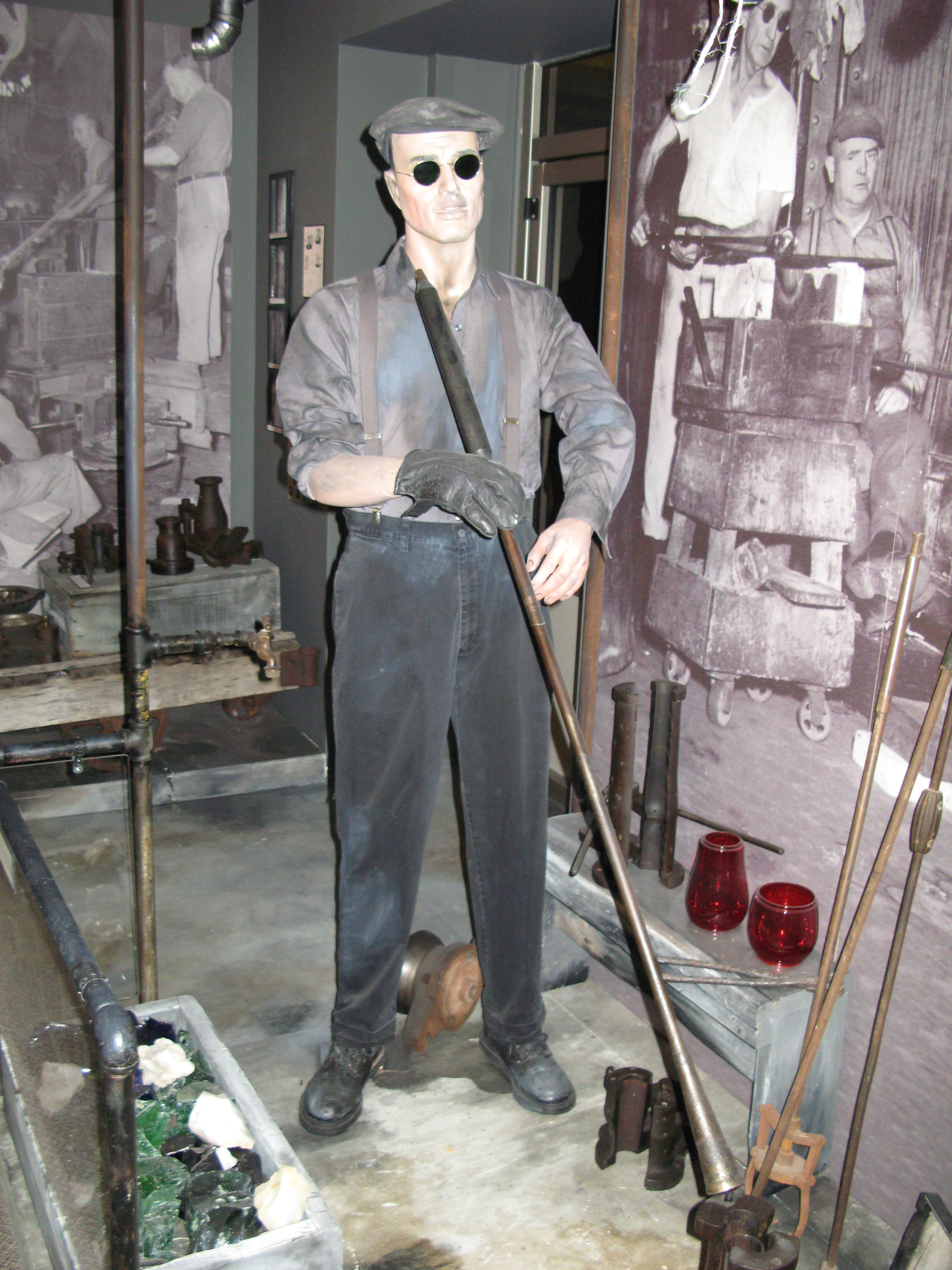
Wallaceburg Museum glass industry exhibit

The Wallaceburg and District Museum documents the history of Wallaceburg, starting with the area's First Nations groups dating back thousands of years. It then moves to the first European settlement started by Lord Selkirk's Baldoon settlers, in 1804. However, the museum's current major focus is on the community's rich industrial heritage. Some of the major industries highlighted include glass, brass, and sugar.

The museum is also home to the Wallaceburg Sports Hall of Fame and a number of other temporary and rotating exhibits. Arguably the most internationally significant artifact on display is the Lee Rifle prototype, the precursor to the Lee–Enfield Rifle. This dates back to 1878 and was invented and perfected in Wallaceburg by James Paris and John Lee. The first shots of the rifle were believed to be taken at the Lee Foundry on the banks of the Sydenham River.

The community also hosts a number of annual events that attract people from around North America. WAMBO is the most notable and is commented on at length below. Live theatre can be experienced at various times during the year. The Jeanne Gordon Theatre puts on at least two productions annually.

Wallaceburg is only minutes from Uncle Tom's Cabin, and is within an hour's drive of Blenheim, Point Pelee National Park, and Rondeau Provincial Park.

== WAMBO ==
The Wallaceburg Antique Motor and Boat Outing is Wallaceburg's largest annual summer festival and was started in 1988. It is the largest transportation show in Canada. It takes place on the second weekend in August every year. The event attracts approximately 30 000 visitors to see the boats, cars, motorcycles, airplanes, fire trucks, tractors, and various other antique vehicles.

In addition to antique vehicle exhibitions, WAMBO also includes a number of other significant events, including a car dream cruise, soap box races, a toy show, art in the park, live bands, food vendors, art and craft vendors, pioneer crafts at the museum, camping in Crothers Park, and free admission to the Wallaceburg and District Museum.

== Education ==
School boards serving the community include Lambton Kent District School Board, the St. Clair Catholic District School Board, the Conseil scolaire catholique Providence (CSC Providence), and the Conseil scolaire Viamonde.

Wallaceburg has six elementary schools and a high school. The public elementary schools are A. A. Wright, and H. W. Burgess. The Catholic elementary schools include St Elizabeth, Holy Family, and Christ the King. There is also Wallaceburg Christian School. Wallaceburg District Secondary School is the town's high school. It accommodates children from Wallaceburg and the surrounding rural communities. In 2018 Edward International Academy opened in the former D. A. Gordon Public school as a private high school with boarding available for foreign and domestic students.

== Climate ==
Climate data for Wallaceburg (1951–1980)
Month	Jan	Feb	Mar	Apr	May	Jun	Jul	Aug	Sep	Oct	Nov	Dec	Year
Record high °C (°F)	18.3 (64.9)	16.1 (61.0)	29.4 (84.9)	30.6 (87.1)	33.5 (92.3)	38.3 (100.9)	38.9 (102.0)	40.0 (104.0)	37.2 (99.0)	30.0 (86.0)	26.1 (79.0)	18.3 (64.9)	40.0 (104.0)
Mean daily maximum °C (°F)	−1.4 (29.5)	−0.4 (31.3)	4.8 (40.6)	12.8 (55.0)	19.9 (67.8)	24.9 (76.8)	27.4 (81.3)	26.5 (79.7)	22.4 (72.3)	16.0 (60.8)	8.0 (46.4)	1.2 (34.2)	13.5 (56.3)
Daily mean °C (°F)	−4.9 (23.2)	−4.1 (24.6)	0.9 (33.6)	7.7 (45.9)	14.2 (57.6)	19.3 (66.7)	21.8 (71.2)	21.1 (70.0)	17.2 (63.0)	11.3 (52.3)	4.6 (40.3)	−1.9 (28.6)	8.9 (48.0)
Mean daily minimum °C (°F)	−8.2 (17.2)	−7.8 (18.0)	−3.1 (26.4)	2.5 (36.5)	8.4 (47.1)	13.7 (56.7)	16.2 (61.2)	15.8 (60.4)	12.0 (53.6)	6.5 (43.7)	1.2 (34.2)	−4.9 (23.2)	4.4 (39.9)
Record low °C (°F)	−30 (−22)	−30 (−22)	−22 (−8)	−12.2 (10.0)	−3.3 (26.1)	1.1 (34.0)	1.7 (35.1)	2.2 (36.0)	−2.2 (28.0)	−7.8 (18.0)	−15.6 (3.9)	−27.2 (−17.0)	−30 (−22)
Average precipitation mm (inches)	49.1 (1.93)	51.3 (2.02)	67.3 (2.65)	72.8 (2.87)	62.7 (2.47)	78.3 (3.08)	60.0 (2.36)	71.8 (2.83)	62.5 (2.46)	58.2 (2.29)	61.2 (2.41)	64.7 (2.55)	759.9 (29.92)
Average rainfall mm (inches)	25.4 (1.00)	32.6 (1.28)	55.0 (2.17)	70.2 (2.76)	62.7 (2.47)	78.3 (3.08)	60.0 (2.36)	71.8 (2.83)	62.5 (2.46)	57.7 (2.27)	53.8 (2.12)	39.9 (1.57)	669.9 (26.37)
Average snowfall cm (inches)	23.8 (9.4)	19.4 (7.6)	12.3 (4.8)	2.6 (1.0)	0.0 (0.0)	0.0 (0.0)	0.0 (0.0)	0.0 (0.0)	0.0 (0.0)	0.5 (0.2)	7.1 (2.8)	23.2 (9.1)	88.9 (35.0)
Average precipitation days (≥ 0.2 mm)	9	9	10	11	10	8	8	8	8	9	9	11	110
Average rainy days (≥ 0.2 mm)	4	4	7	10	10	8	8	8	8	8	8	6	89
Average snowy days (≥ 0.2 cm)	6	5	4	1	0	0	0	0	0	0	2	5	23
Source: Environment Canada

== Healthcare ==
Wallaceburg and Chatham-Kent as a whole are served by the Chatham-Kent Health Alliance, since 2019. The Public General Hospital and Saint Joseph Hospital in Chatham were moved to a single campus in 2004, while the former Sydenham District Hospital remains in Wallaceburg. The Sydenham District Hospital was opened in 1957 after many years of lobbying. Wallaceburg is one of the few smaller communities in Ontario with a fully functioning facility. The now-Wallaceburg District Hospital has an emergency room, x-ray facility, laboratory, and various therapies.

== Sports ==
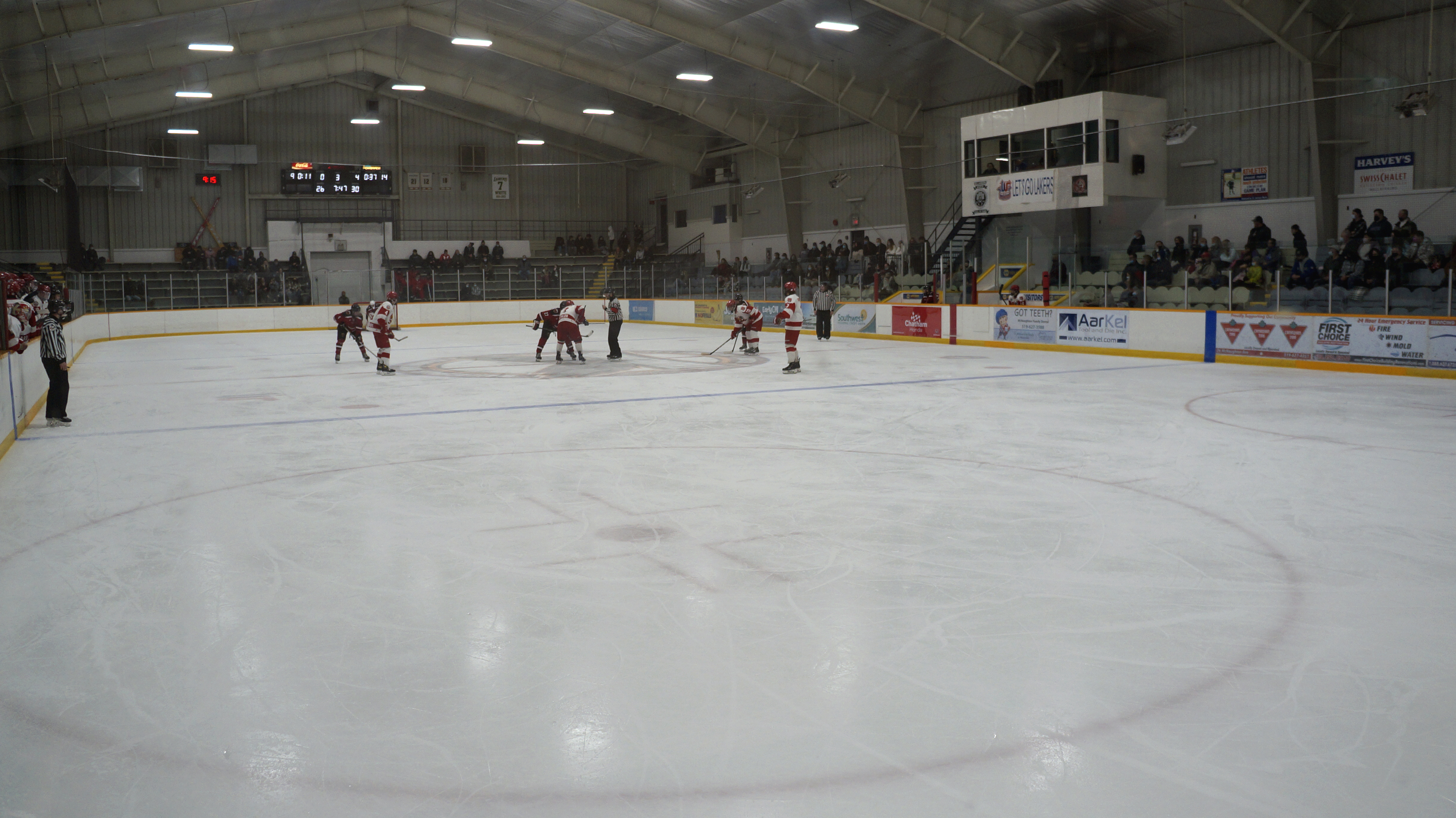
Wallaceburg Memorial Arena

Wallaceburg is home to an assortment of amateur sports teams. The Wallaceburg Thunderhawks are the local Junior C hockey team. The Wallaceburg Red Devils are the local Junior B lacrosse team. Other teams include the Wallaceburg Warriors, men's and women's baseball teams, and the Wallaceburg District Secondary School Tartans. In 2001, the Wallaceburg Red Devils won the Founders Cup, the national Championship for Canadian Junior B lacrosse.

Wallaceburg was one of the stops on the historic Olympic Torch Relay (Vancouver 2010 Winter Olympics) on Christmas Eve, 2009 (Day 56).

In 2011, Wallaceburg was selected to win a community grant of $25,000 from TSN and Kraft Foods to refresh outdoor lacrosse fields. Many town members spent hours voting continuously over that 24-hour span, and even booked the local UAW hall in town to hold a voting session. Some townspeople also had friends in Australia, England, the United States and South Korea voting for the town.

== Transportation ==
Wallaceburg is linked to Chatham, Blenheim, Sarnia and the Blue Water Bridge to the United States by Highway 40. The Sydenham River runs through the town of Wallaceburg, and provides a water connection to Lake St. Clair and the rest of the Great Lakes water basin. The Sydenham River is dredged to a depth of approximately 20 feet (6.1 m).

The Walpole Island Ferry serves as the closest method of transportation to the United States, located just outside of Wallaceburg.

== Media ==
=== Print ===
- The Wallaceburg Courier Press is a local paper owned and operated by Postmedia Network. It was owned by Gary O'Flynn from its debut in September 1972 to 1991. O'Flynn was a former mayor of the town (1989–1991). The Courier Press continued to print weekly and online until June 2026.
- The Wallaceburg News was a local paper owned and operated by the Osprey Media Group. It was the oldest paper in Wallaceburg. It closed in 1996, and later reformed in 1999 as the Wallaceburg Community News. It became the Wallaceburg News in 2003. The Wallaceburg News shut down in October 2007, and closed their office after a four-year newspaper war with the Courier Press.

=== Radio ===
- CKXS-FM is Wallaceburg's only local radio station, which launched on 20 October 2009. The station broadcasts at 99.1 FM with an adult contemporary format.

== Politics ==
In the November 2006 municipal election Tom McGregor and Sheldon Parsons were elected as Ward Five Chatham-Kent councillors. These two men are responsible to constituents in the Wallaceburg area. Go to Chatham-Kent Municipal Council for a list of other municipal politicians.

Previous representatives:

- 2003–2006 Chip Gordon and Tom McGregor
- 2000–2003 Chip Gordon and Tom McGregor
- 1997–2000 Chip Gordon and Jeff Wesley

Following is a partial list of Wallaceburg Mayors prior to amalgamation into Chatham-Kent:

- 1991–1997 Jeff Wesley
- 1989–1991 Gary O'Flynn
- 1981–1989 Don Truan
- 1977–1981 Lou Stonehouse
- 1976 Joseph Taylor
- 1970–1975 Cecile Bechard
- 1966–1969 Nigel Savage
- 1963–1965 Alan B. Cousins
- 1962 George Clement
- 1959–1961 Robert Newberry
- 1957–1958 Jack Thompson
- 1952–1956 William Collins
- 1951 Wilfred Picard

== Community organizations ==
Wallaceburg is home to a number of strong community organizations, including the Wallaceburg and District Chamber of Commerce, the Business improvement area, Rotary (1945–2020), Knights of Pythias, Knights of Columbus, Royal Canadian Legion, and Kinsmen.

== Notable residents ==
- Brigitte Belton (1970–), 2022 Canada convoy protest founder.
- David Corrente (1983–), former Minor League Baseball player and coach; member of Canada's Olympic Baseball Team at the Beijing Olympics in 2008.
- Marian Coveny (1954–2022), first captain of the Canada women's national ice hockey team.
- David Alexander Gordon (1858–1919), Liberal Party MP, Wallaceburg mayor; co-founder of Sydenham Glass Company.
- Jeanne Gordon (1885–1952), Metropolitan Opera singer, daughter of D. A. Gordon.
- Seth Griffith (1993–), professional hockey player.
- Tim Landeryou (1984–), racquetball player.
- John Lee (1833–1907), co-inventor of the Lee rifle (1878).
- Stef Sanjati (1995–), YouTube personality and vlogger.
- Doug Shedden (1961–), NHL player, EV Zug head coach.
- Shaun Suisham (1981–), Pittsburgh Steelers player (placekicker).
