= David Alexander Gordon =

Canadian politician

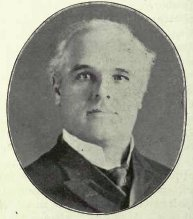

Member of the Canadian Parliament for Kent East
- In office 1904–1917
- Preceded by: The electoral district was created in 1903.
- Succeeded by: The electoral district was abolished in 1914.

Personal details
- Born: January 18, 1858 Wallaceburg, Canada West
- Died: March 9, 1919 (aged 61)
- Party: Liberal

David Alexander Gordon (January 18, 1858 – March 9, 1919) was a Canadian politician. Born in Wallaceburg, Canada West, the son of Aaron Gordon (Scottish heritage), and Jane Steinchoff (German heritage), Gordon educated at the public schools in Wallaceburg.

His son Arthur Saint Clair Gordon (1894–1953) later served as an Ontario cabinet minister. His daughter Ruby May Gordon (1885–1952) was an opera singer.

== Political career ==
A manufacturer, he was a town councillor and mayor of Wallaceburg from 1898 to 1900. He was an unsuccessful candidate for the House of Commons of Canada for the electoral district of Bothwell at the general elections of 1900. He was elected in 1904 for the electoral district of Kent East. A Liberal, he was re-elected in 1908 and 1911.

== Business career ==
Although D. A. Gordon had a successful regional and national political career he is known locally as the "Father of Modern Wallaceburg". He was most likely given this title for his work in establishing four of Wallaceburg's most successful industries: Wallaceburg Cooperage Company (1887), Sydenham Glass Company (1894), Canada and Dominion Sugar Company (1901), and the Wallaceburg Brass and Iron Limited Company (1905). He played various leadership roles in starting the aforementioned businesses, however, his ability to raise investment funds was invaluable.

== Legacy ==
A southside public school was in his honour, the D. A. Gordon Public School, on 430 King Street, from 1922 before its closure in June 2014. It then became the Edward International Academy.

== Electoral record ==
1900 Canadian federal election: Bothwell
Party	Candidate	Votes
Conservative	James Clancy	2,547
Liberal	David A. Gordon	2,430
