= Follow Your Heart (1936 film) =

1936 film by Aubrey Scotto

- Directed by: Aubrey Scotto
- Written by: Dana Burnet (story); Lester Cole (writer); Olive Cooper (additional dialogue); Samuel Ornitz (writer); Nathanael West (writer)
- Produced by: Leonard Fields; Nat Levine; Albert E. Levoy
- Starring: Marion Talley; Michael Bartlett; Nigel Bruce; Luis Alberni; Henrietta Crosman
- Cinematography: Alan Jones; John J. Mescall
- Edited by: Ernest J. Nims; Robert L. Simpson
- Music by: Hugo Riesenfeld
- Distributed by: Republic Pictures
- Release date: August 11, 1936
- Running time: 82 minutes
- Country: United States
- Language: English

Follow Your Heart is a 1936 American musical film directed by Aubrey Scotto and starring Marion Talley, Nigel Bruce and Luis Alberni. It was distributed by Republic Pictures.

== Cast ==
- Marion Talley as Marian Forrester
- Michael Bartlett as Michael Williams
- Nigel Bruce as Henri Forrester
- Luis Alberni as Tony Masetti
- Henrietta Crosman as Madame Bovard
- Vivienne Osborne as Gloria Forrester
- Walter Catlett as Joe Sheldon
- Eunice Healey as Specialty Dancer
- Ben Blue as himself
- Mickey Rentschler as Tommy Forrester
- John Eldredge as Harrison Beecher
- Margaret Irving as Louise Masetti
- Si Jenks as Mr. Hawks
- Josephine Whittell as Mrs. Plunkett

== Soundtrack ==
- "Page Song" from opera Les Huguenots (Written by Giacomo Meyerbeer)
- "Follow Your Heart" (Music by Victor Schertzinger, lyrics by Sidney D. Mitchell)
- "Magnolias in the Moonlight" (Music by Victor Schertzinger, lyrics by Walter Bullock)
- "Who Minds'Bout Me" (Music by Victor Schertzinger, lyrics by Walter Bullock)
