= Wallaceburg and District Museum =

Coordinates: 42°35′N 82°22′W

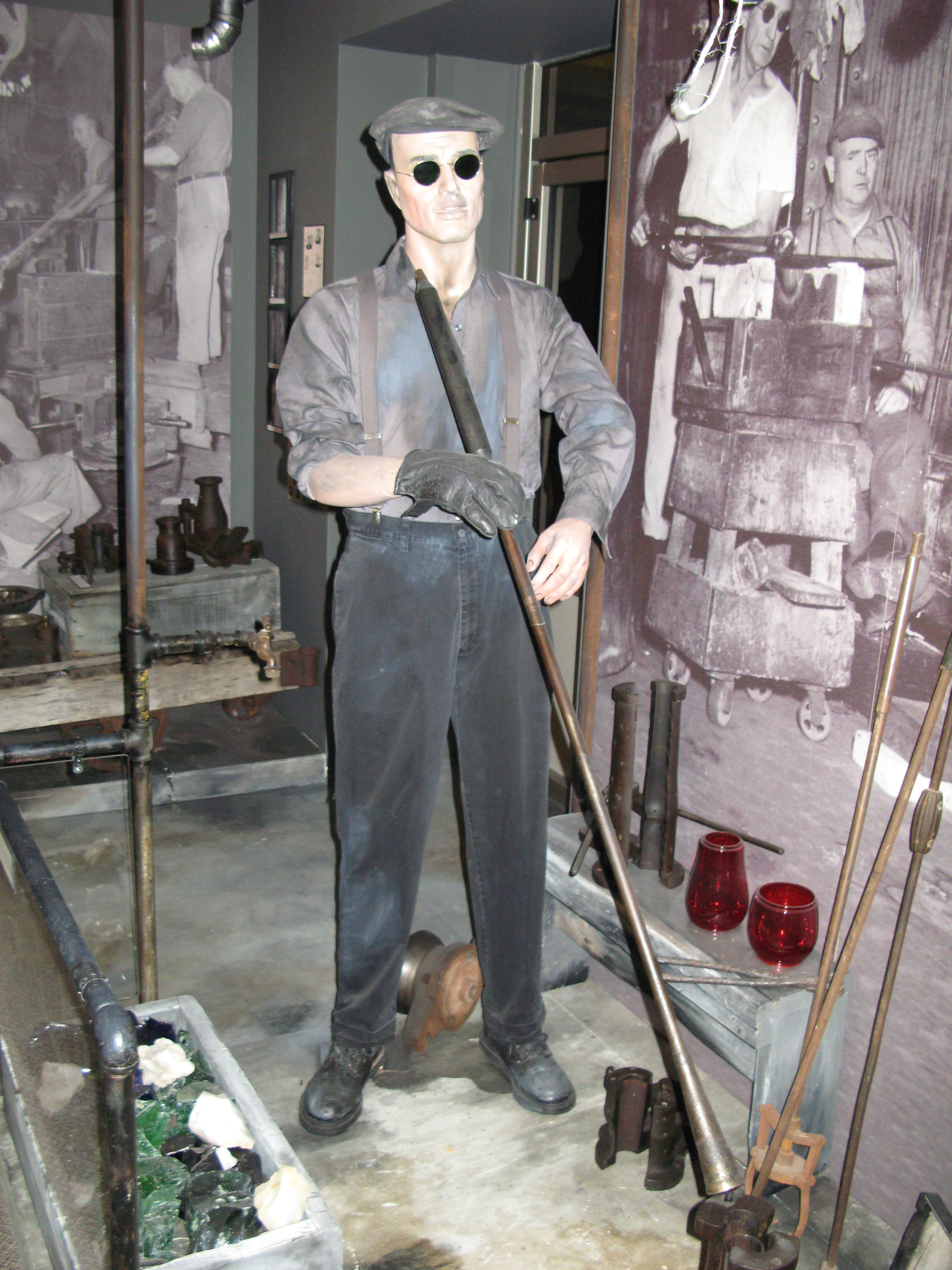
- Established: June 29, 1984
- Location: 505 King Street, Wallaceburg, Ontario, Canada
- Type: Cultural/Historic Museum
- Collection size: 85,000
- Website: https://www.wallaceburgmuseum.ca

The Wallaceburg and District Museum is located in Southern Ontario in the town of Wallaceburg. Located a half-block from the banks of the Sydenham River, the museum occupies the former Wallaceburg Hydro Office at 505 King Street. The museum opened on June 29, 1984. The museum documents the beginning of the Wallaceburg community from the founding of the Baldoon Settlement by Lord Selkirk in 1804 to its success as an industrial hub in the mid-1900s.

== History ==
=== Founding (1974–1984) ===
In 1974, five men combined their efforts to found the Wallaceburg and District Historical Society (WDHS). They were Doug Thompson, A.G. Fairhead, Tom Chatterton, Frank Mann and Al Mann.

The group sought to create a means of preserving and exhibiting the history of the Wallaceburg community, and decided on the creation of a public museum. In 1975, the WDHS used funds from the recently acquired "New Horizon Grant" to purchase microfiche and recording equipment to begin compiling materials for the project. The WDHS began conducting interviews with older citizens of the community, and sorting material property to one day be exhibited. In 1981, the Ontario Ministry of Tourism, Culture and Sport (formerly known as the Ontario Ministry of Culture and Recreation) became involved in the project, and worked with the WDHS to find potential sites for the construction of the museum, one of which being a large building at 505 King Street owned by Wallaceburg Hydro. In 1983, The Town of Wallaceburg purchased the building from Wallaceburg Hydro for $1 Canadian. On June 29, 1984, the Wallaceburg and District Museum was officially opened.

=== Von Ayres Cultural Centre (1997) ===
In 1997, the museum was massively renovated to include a larger basement for future exhibits, as well as an upstairs auditorium for guest speakers, concerts, and presentations. The auditorium would also be available to the public to be rented for personal events. Renovations were completed within the year, and the auditorium was named Hydro Electric Auditorium, harking back to the original ownership of the building by Wallaceburg Hydro. The entire complex, containing both the auditorium and the museum, was given the name Von Ayres Cultural Centre in honour of late Wallaceburg WW1 veteran Sgt. Estell Von Ayres.

=== Modernization and growth (2001–2010) ===
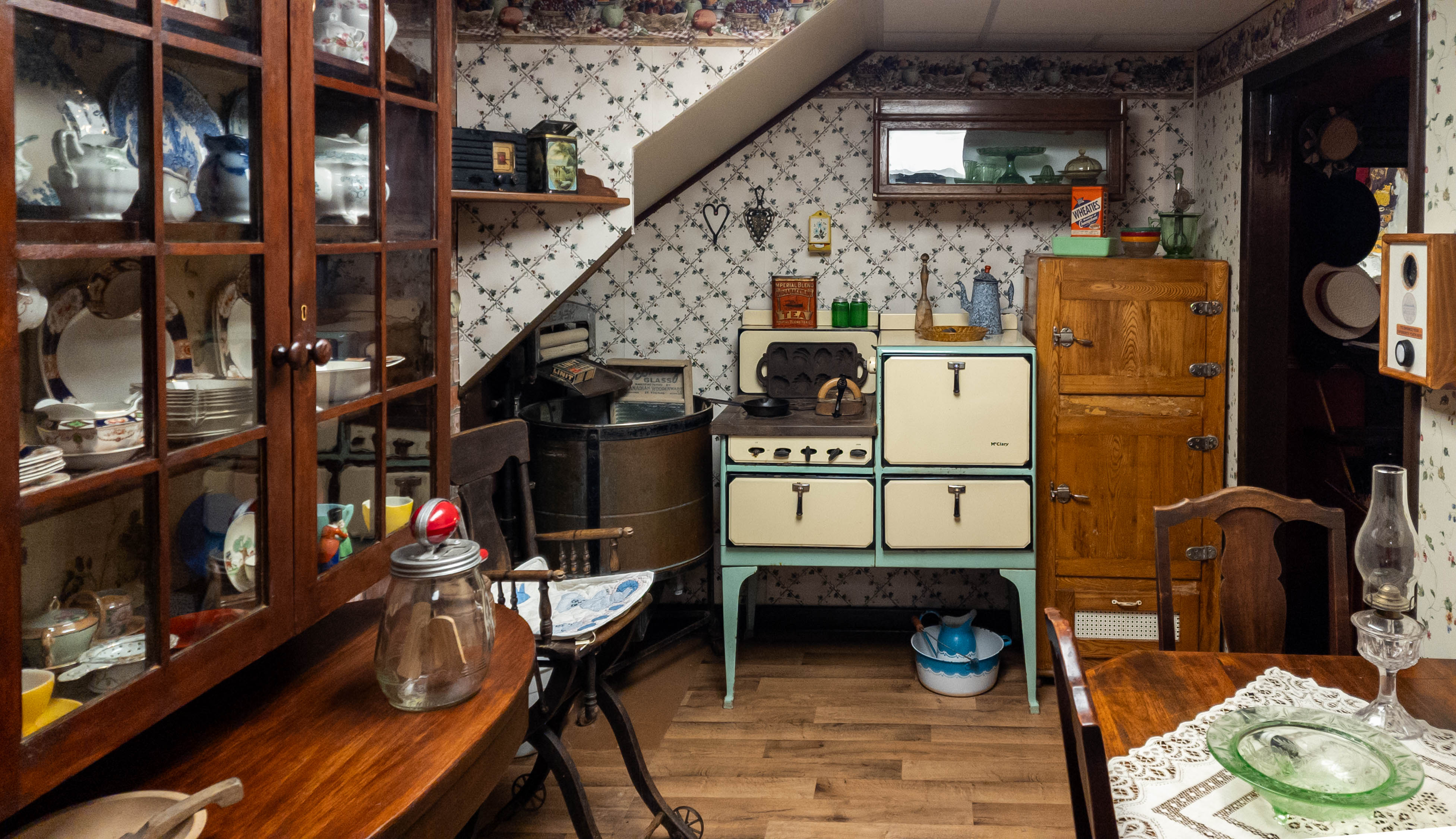
An early 20th-century kitchen, one of the displays in the basement

In 2001 and 2002, work was done to completely renovate the Glass Gallery Exhibit. The WDHS worked with retired workers from the Sydenham Glass Company (which had just recently closed in 1999) to collect and authenticate new pieces for the overhauled exhibit.

After a four-year renovation hiatus, staff and volunteers began work on a massive exhibit that would eventually become the Industrial Room. During this renovation, the decision was made to construct portable walls that would make further renovations and redesigns of the exhibits easier.

From 2008 to 2010, the previously added basement was expanded to include three new exhibits. During this time, the museum also acquired a $2600 "Museums and Technology Grant" from the government of Ontario. This money was used to purchase the PastPerfect Museum Software, which would enable the museum to digitally catalogue all archival materials.

In 2010, funding for a mural and bench on the north side of the museum was provided by Wallaceburg resident Saundra Vansnick in memory of her husband George Vansnick, who was a founding member of the WDHS.

=== Wallaceburg Sports Hall of Fame (2011) ===
Funding was received in 2011 from the Wallaceburg Sports Hall of Fame to completely redesign and renovate the sports room. A touchscreen exhibit was added cataloguing all Wallaceburg Sports Hall of Fame inductees. Additionally, a digital information sign was installed at the front of the building, and the museum's website was professionally redesigned.

== Building ==
The museum is built upon a plot of land originally granted to Captain John McGregor by The Crown for outstanding service in the War of 1812. In 1876, McGregor donated the land to the Town of Wallaceburg. He stipulated the land was to be used for municipal purposes, and it became the site of the First Town Hall and Opera House. In 1905, the Hedgling Brass and Iron Manufacturing Company (now the former Waltec) began its operations in the building's basement. In 1925, the Wallaceburg Hydro building was constructed on the site, where it would eventually be sold to the municipality for use as the museum.

== Exhibits and collections ==
=== The Glass Gallery ===
The Glass Gallery is dedicated to the history of Wallaceburg's once highly successful glass manufacturing industry, as well as the art of glass blowing all over the world.

The collection ranges from small poison bottles, to oversized champagne bottles originally blown right in Wallaceburg. Along with these items, the exhibit features photos and dioramas of glassblowers working in the factories.

=== The Industrial Room ===
The Industrial Room is home to the history of Wallaceburg's once large industrial sector. The exhibit showcases baseball gear, water taps, pressure cookers, and other various products and tools that were manufactured and used in the various factories, and are important relics of Wallaceburg's industrial past. The exhibit also serves to pay homage to the many company branches Wallaceburg has been home to over the years. These branches include Waltec, Dominion Sugar Company (presently known as Domino Foods), Libbey's (presently known as the Libbey-Owens-Ford Company), Heinz, Greenmelk, and Wallaceburg Dairies.

=== The Marine Room ===
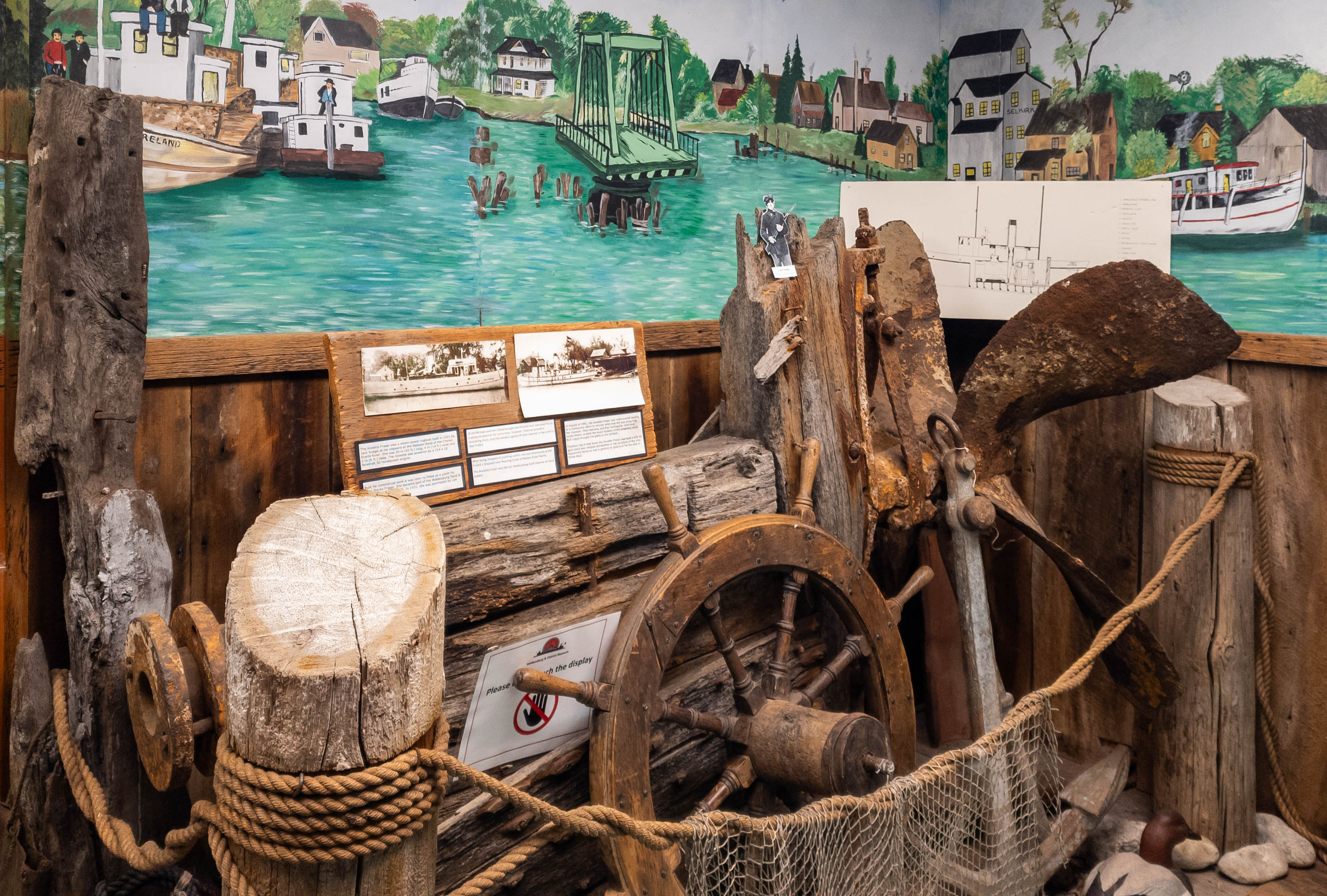
A display in the Marine Room

The Marine Room is dedicated to providing information of the history of Wallaceburg's marine shipping industry. The room is home to several models, including those of ships that were built in Wallaceburg, the shaft and prop from the Annette Fraser steamer, and a photo display of John McCallum's Lake Superior rescue bid.

=== James Streetscape ===
The James Streetscape is one of the oldest exhibits in the museum, and serves to demonstrate what the downtown sector of Wallaceburg was like in the 1920s.

The exhibit features full recreations of local companies and storefronts, inspired by both personal accounts from people alive during the era and photos taken of the James Street area during the early-mid 1900s. Some of the recreated storefronts and shops feature real tools and materials used in the time, such as old 20th century medical materials in the doctor's office.

=== Sports Room ===
As one of the newly renovated rooms in the museum, the exhibit features records of every single inductee in the hall of fame since the first induction ceremony held in 1982. Also in the hall of fame is a collection of sporting equipment and paraphernalia once belonging to many historic Wallaceburg athletes.

The room also features displays dedicated to some of the more recent successes in professional sports born in Wallaceburg, such as previous Pittsburgh Steelers kicker Shaun Suisham, and Toronto Maple Leafs centre Seth Griffith.

=== The Baldoon Mystery ===
The museum houses an interactive exhibit dedicated to the local folklore and ghost story traditionally referred to as The Baldoon Mystery. The lore of said mystery is centered around Wallaceburg farmer John T. McDonald and his family during the years of 1830–1840, and the community's belief that the family was being cursed by a witch.

The exhibit features newspaper clippings documenting the Baldoon Mystery, as well as artifacts from the time period and a model of the supposed witch. There is also a five-minute video experience provided to guests who wish to learn more about the tale.

=== Baldoon Pioneer Room ===
This room contains information on the original settlers to the Wallaceburg area. Exhibits here aim to demonstrate to guests what life was like for the first settlers from Scotland, and to showcase what kind of fashion, tools, and responsibilities were common in early pioneer lives. The room also features a functional weaving loom that was built in the 1790s.

=== Legion Room ===
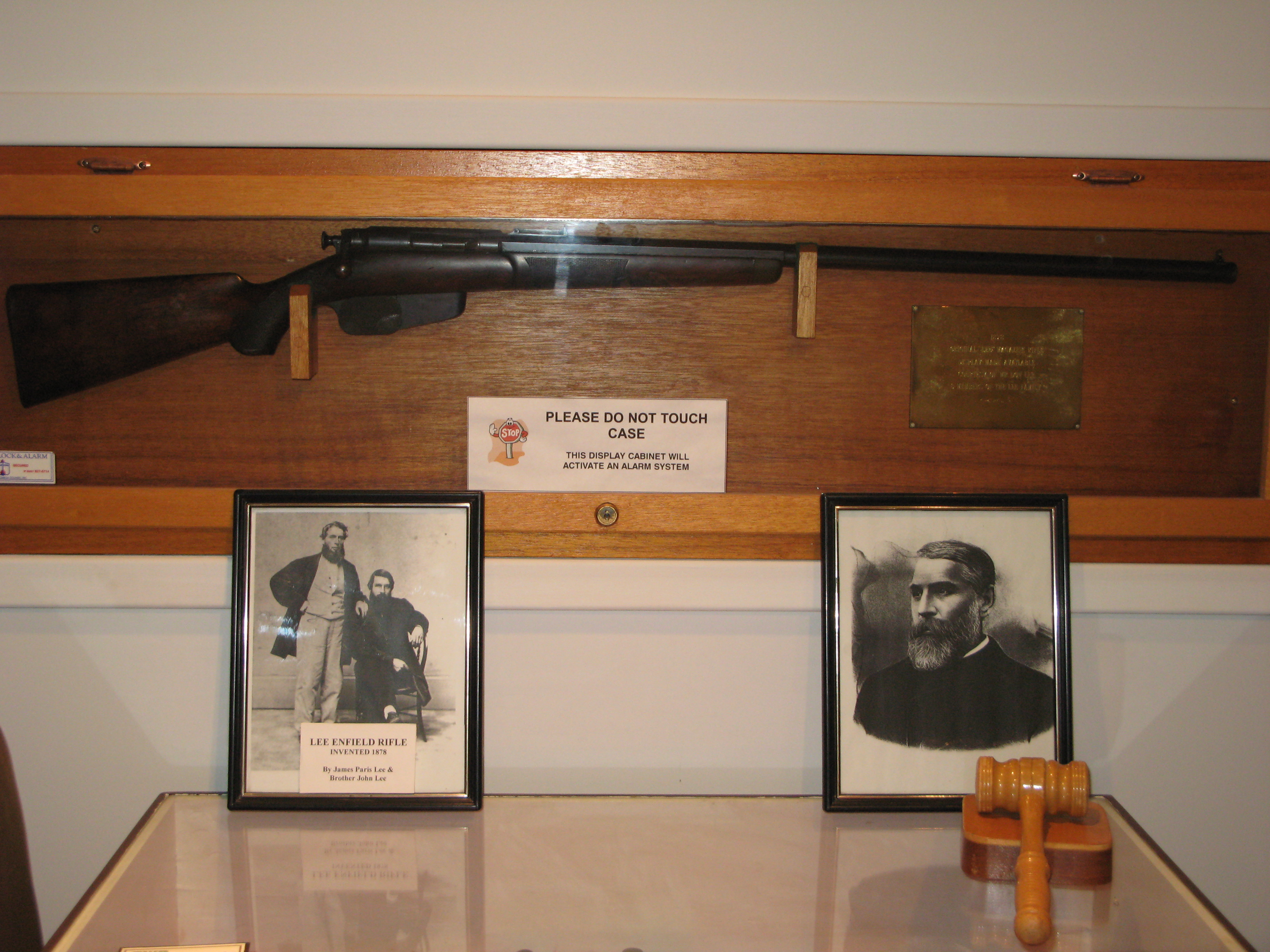
Lee Rifle Prototype 1878

The Legion Room is dedicated to the Canadian Armed Forces. The collections in the room include uniforms, equipment, models, and written stories from Canada's efforts overseas during WWI and WWII. The room also features an exhibited dedicated to the inception and perfection of the famous Lee-Enfield rifle, which was invented in Wallaceburg in 1878.

The exhibit was created with the help of the Royal Canadian Legion Branch 18 members and was completed in spring 2010.

== Photo gallery ==
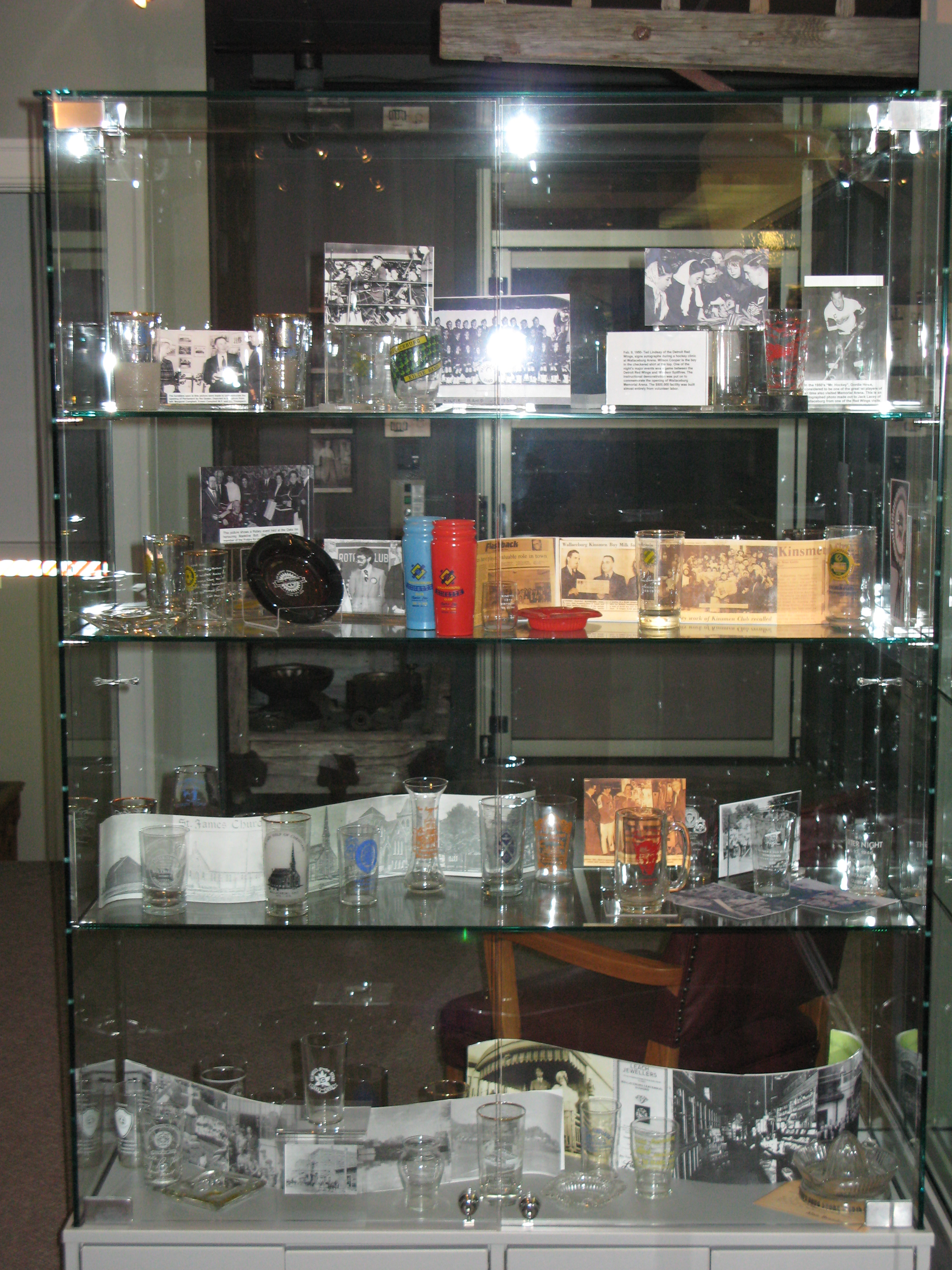

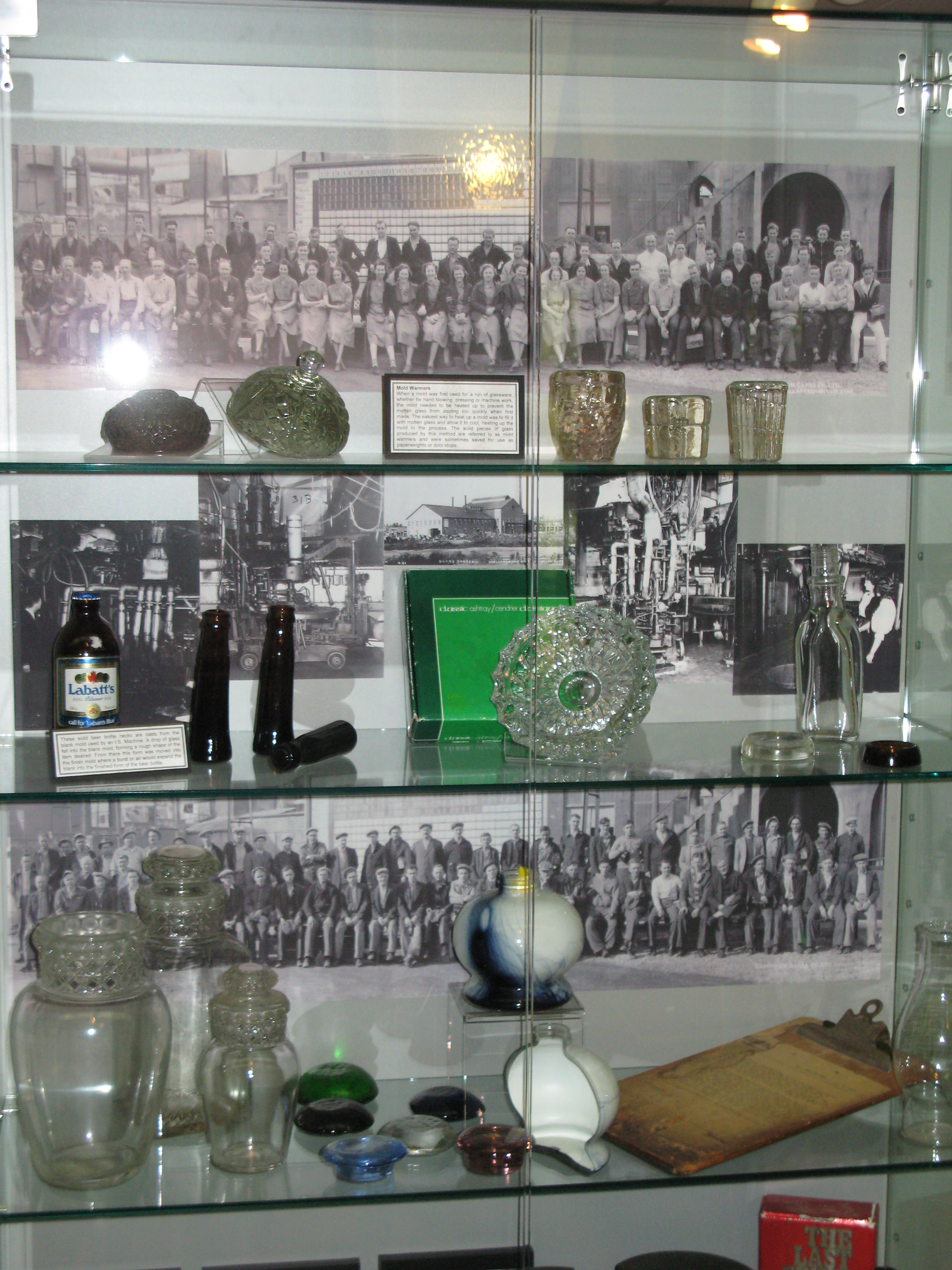

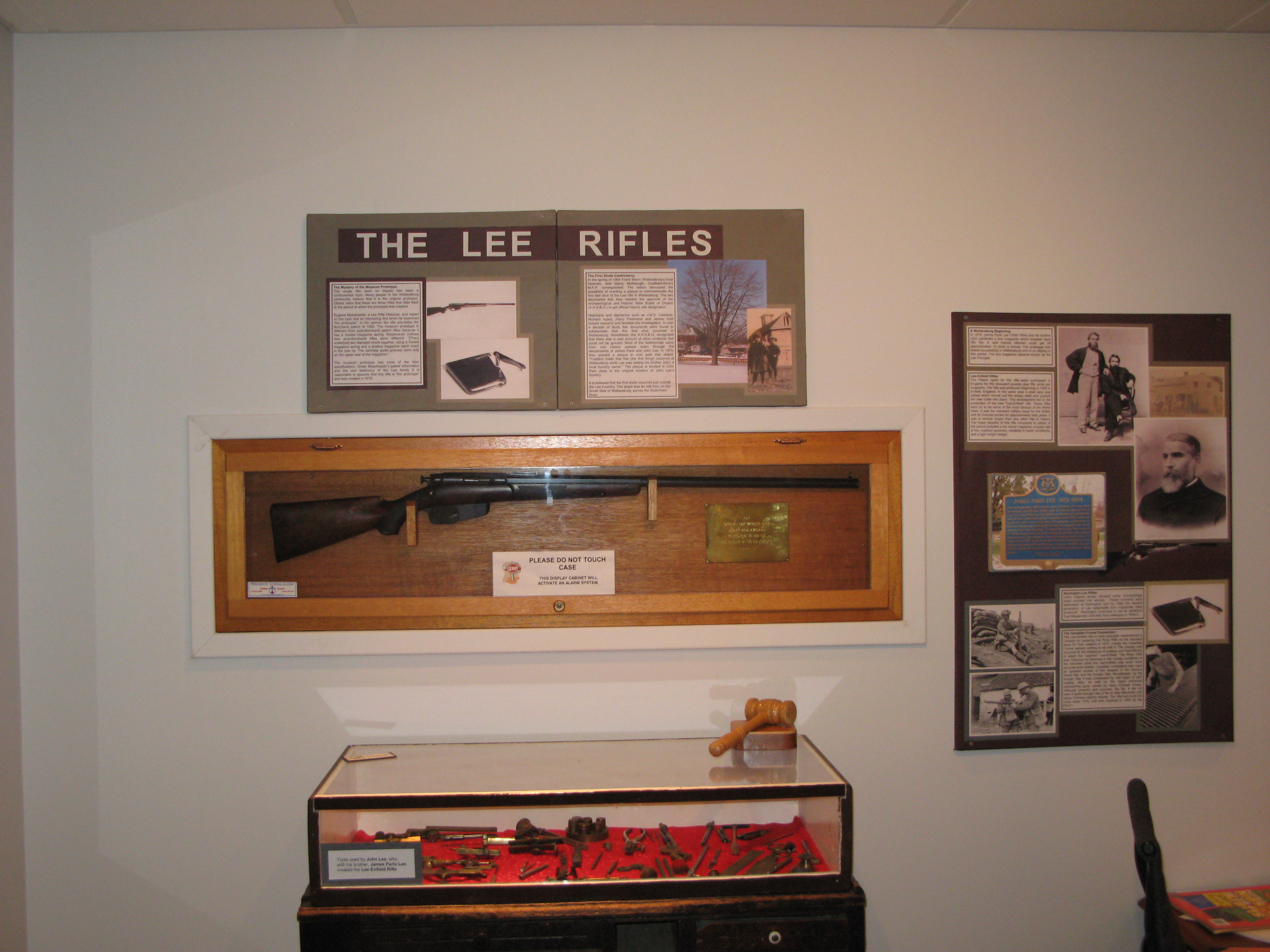

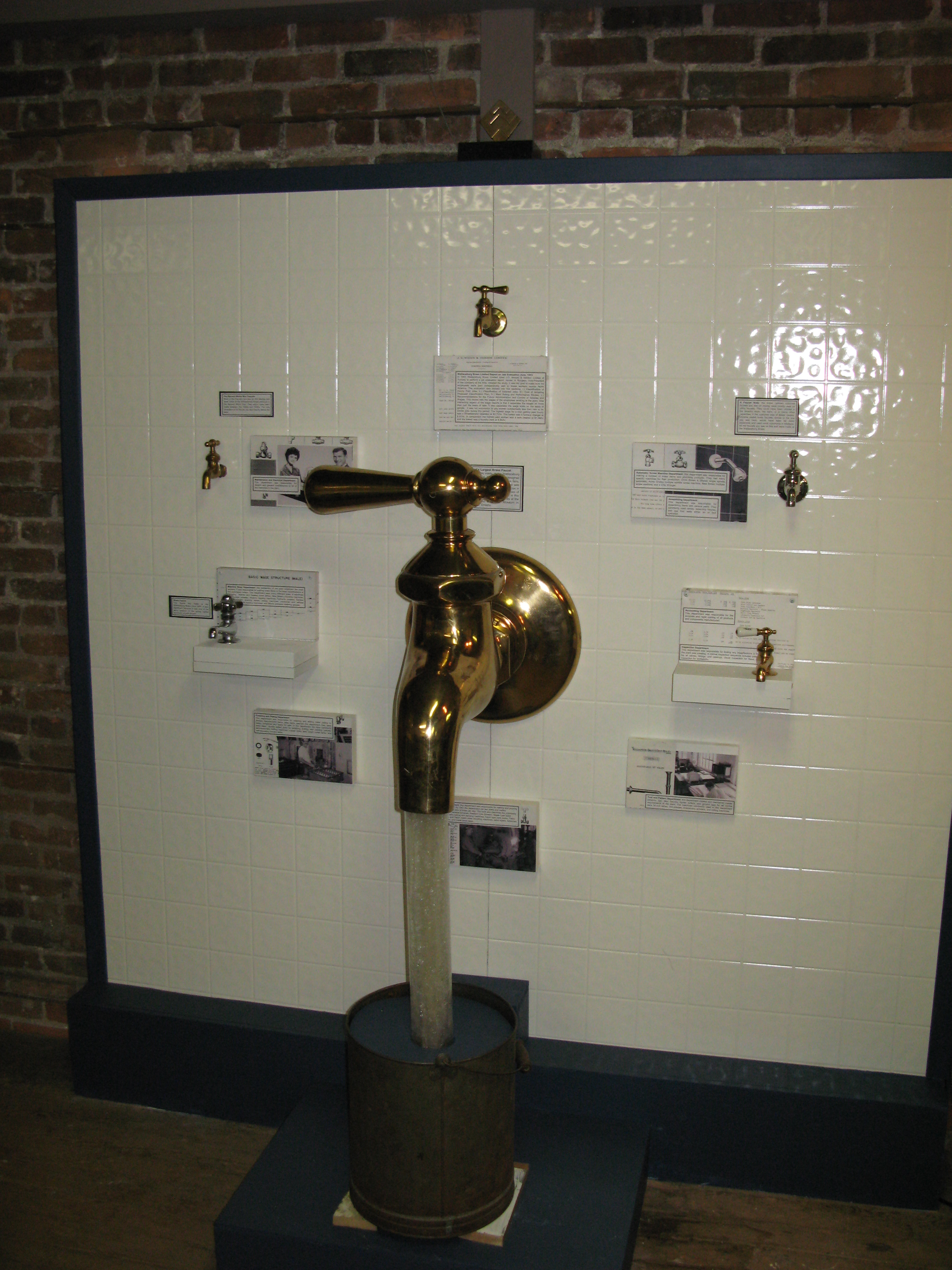

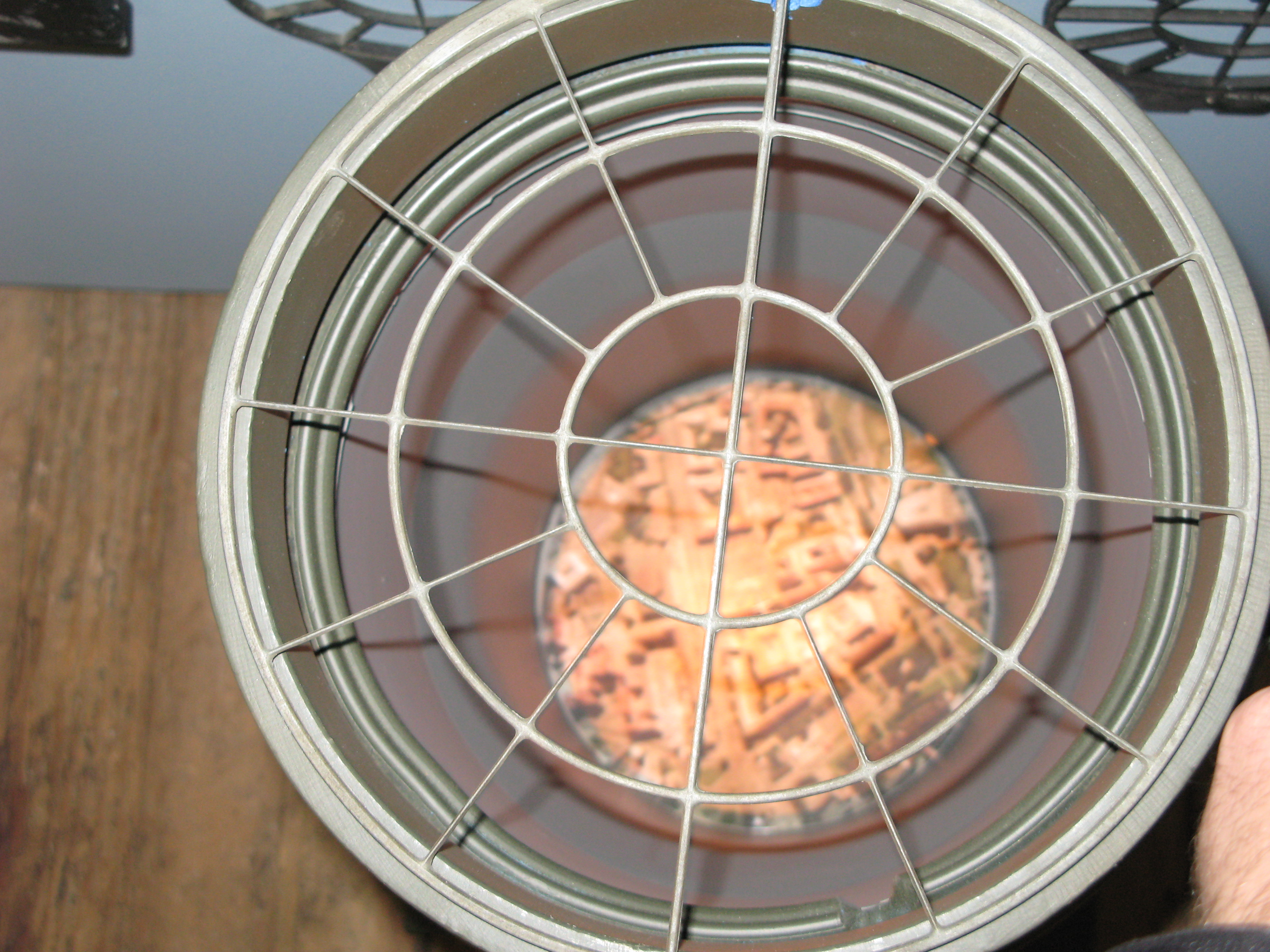

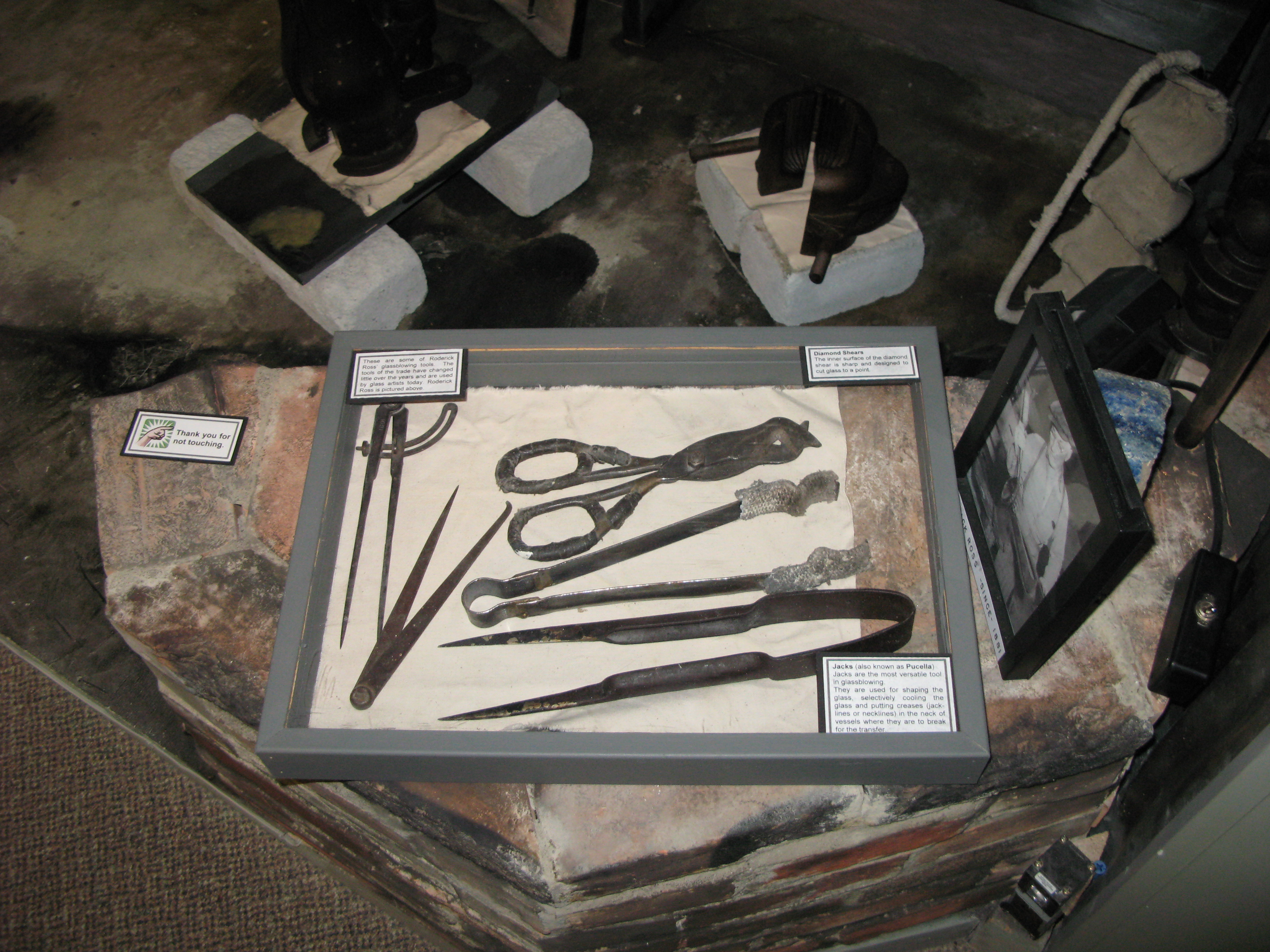

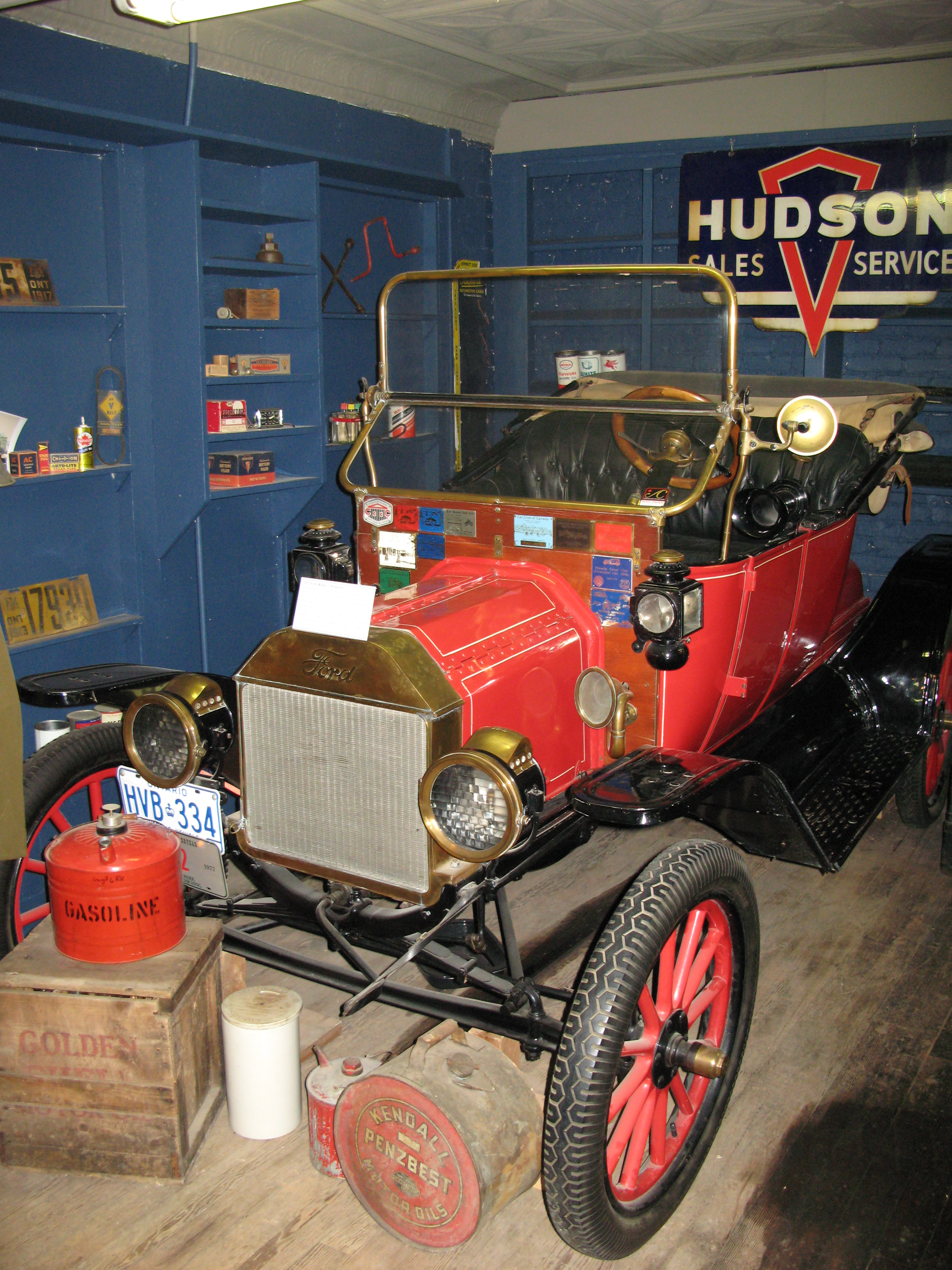

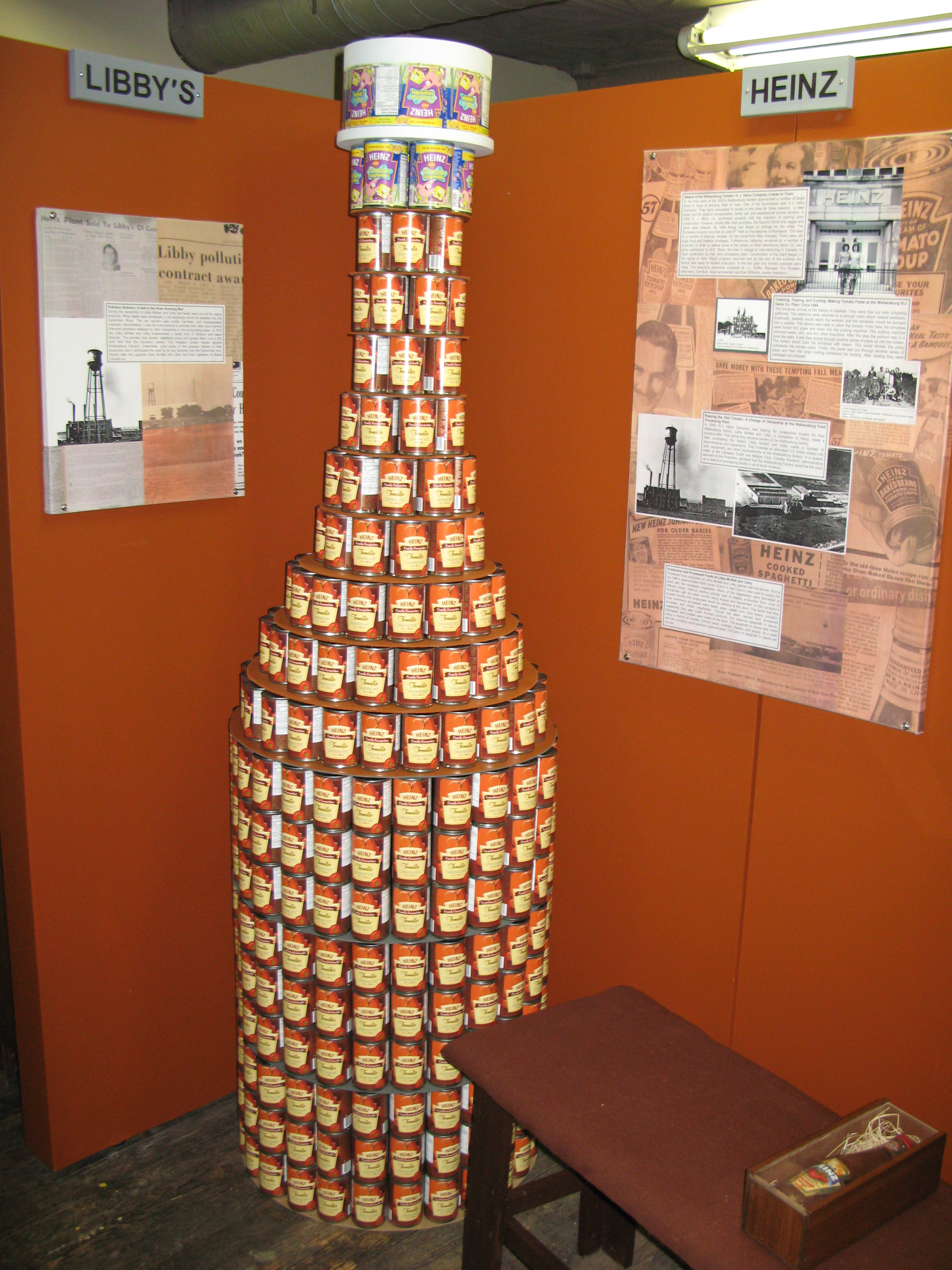

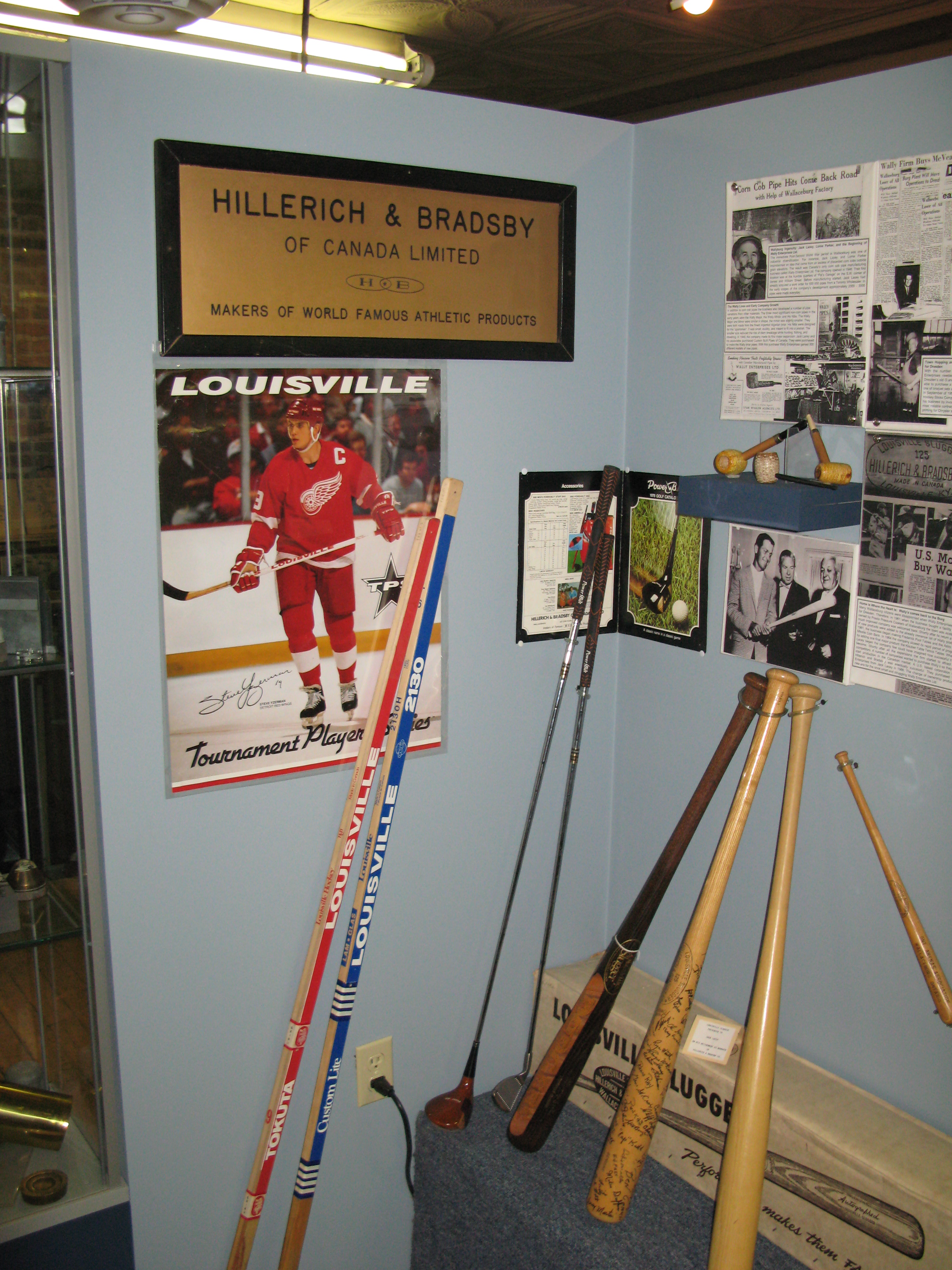

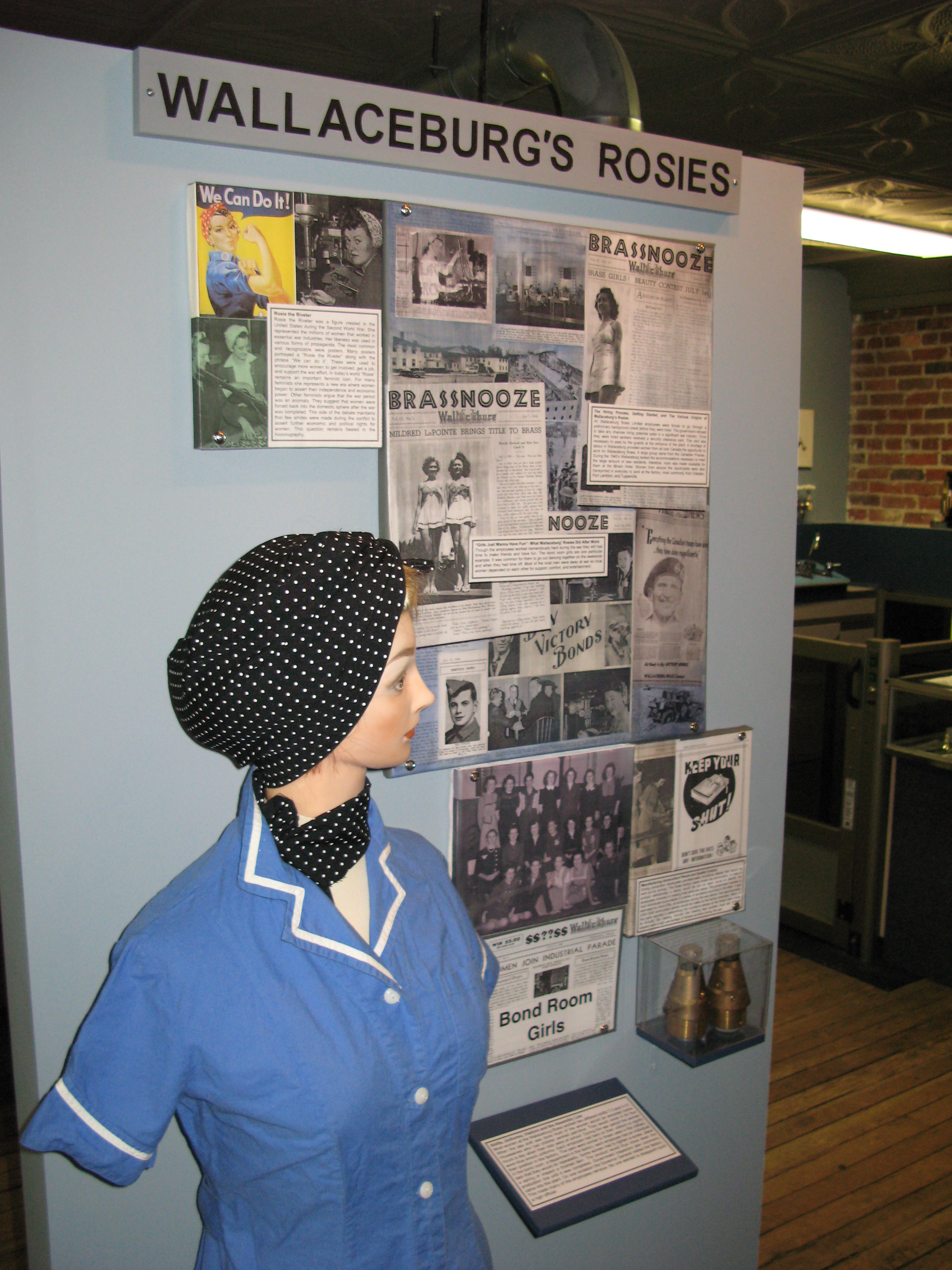

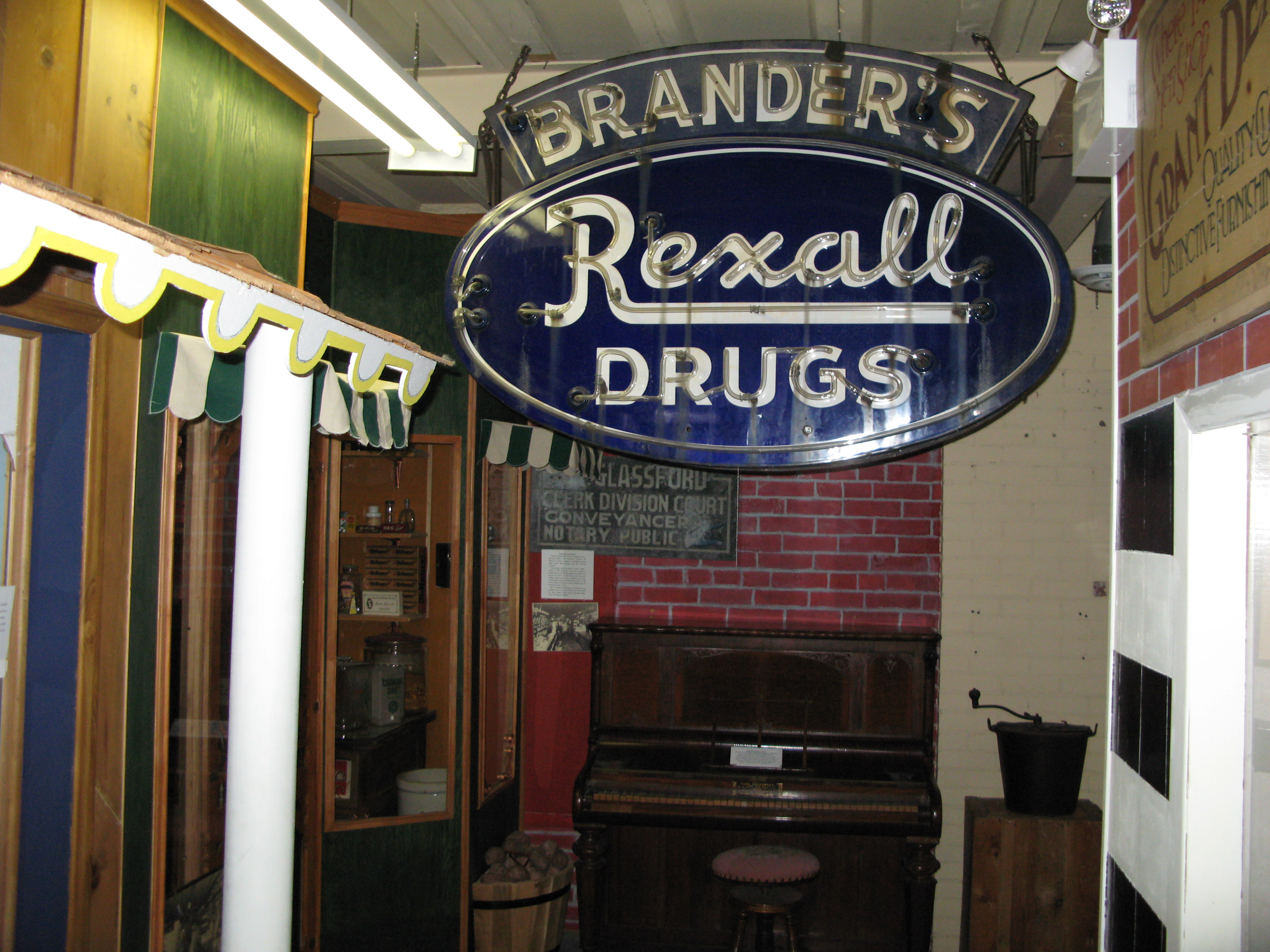

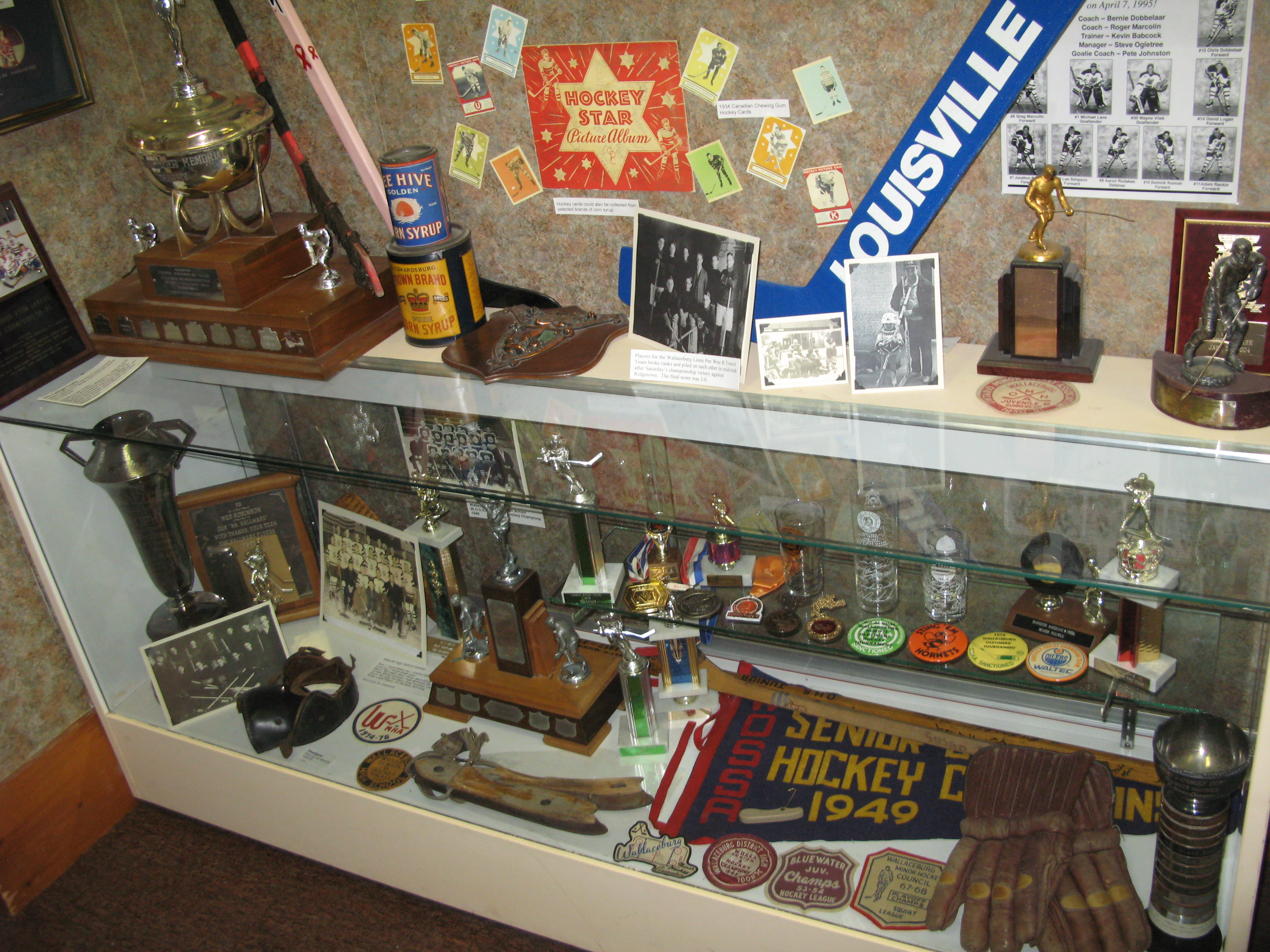

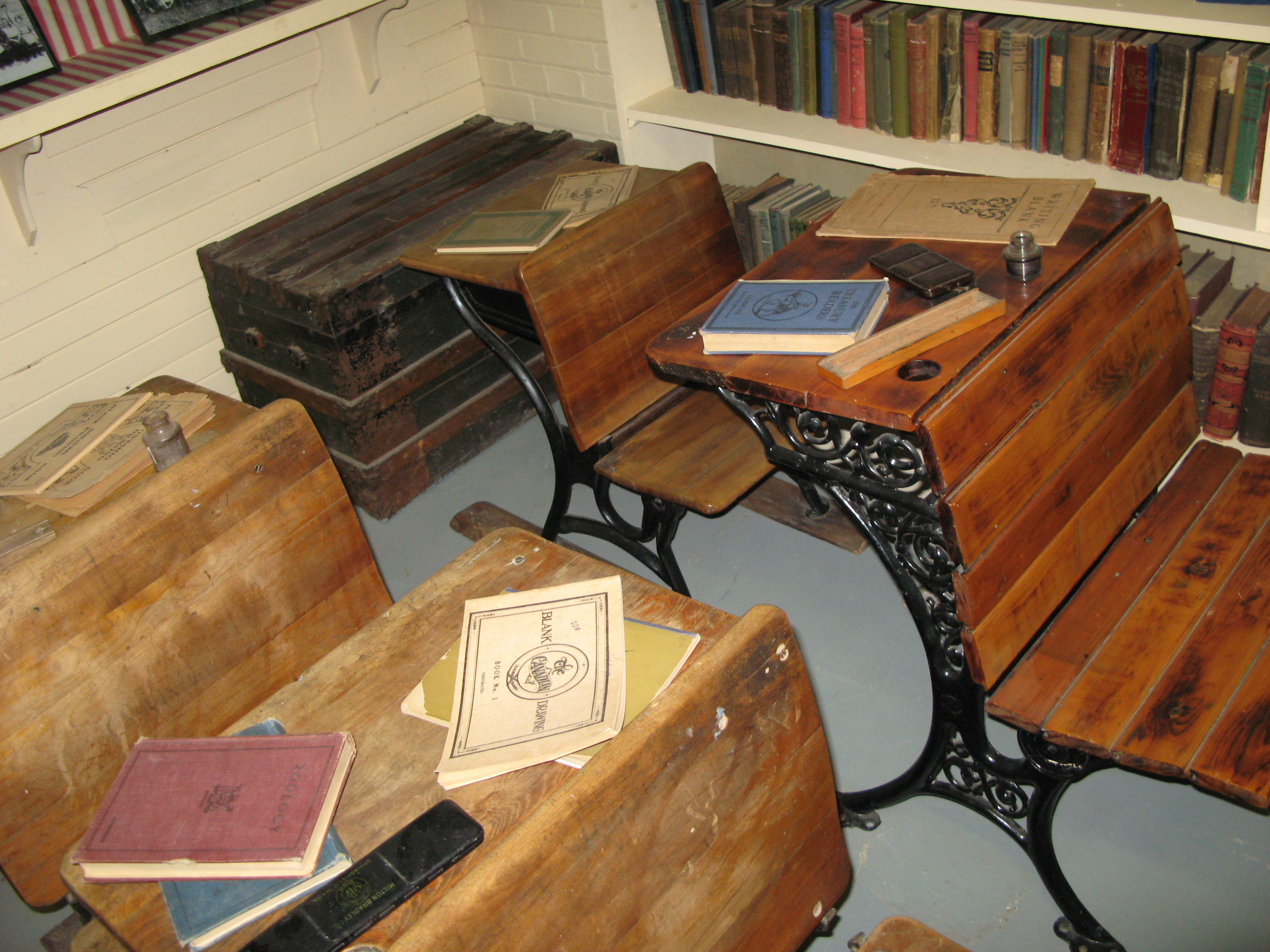
