= Jeanne Gordon =

Canadian opera singer

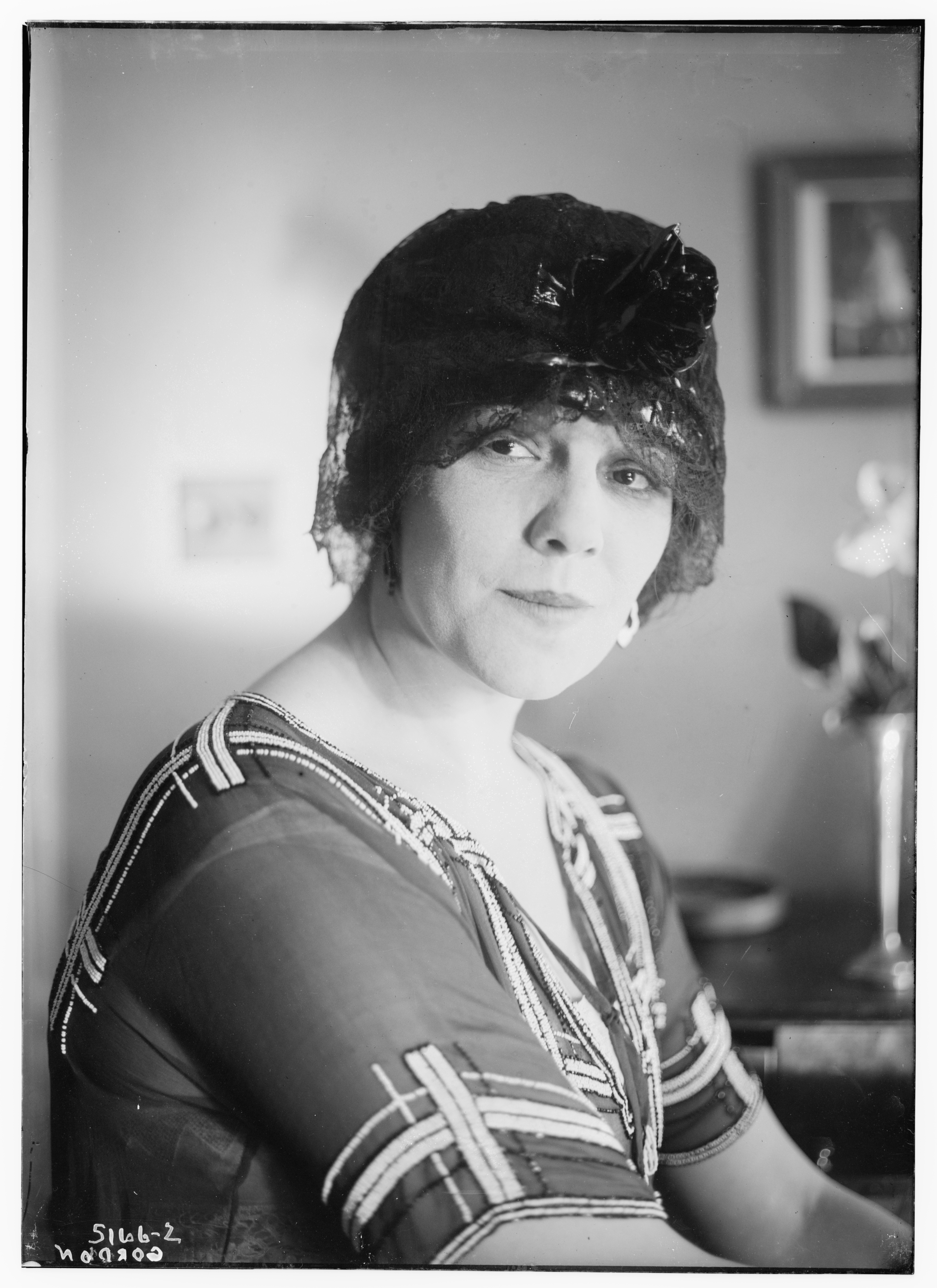
Jeanne Gordon in 1920

Jeanne Gordon (born Ruby May Gordon, January 26, 1885 – February 22, 1952) was a Canadian contralto opera singer active during the early 1900s.

Gordon was born as Ruby May Gordon in Wallaceburg, Ontario, Canada on January 26, 1885, to businessman and politician David Alexander Gordon (1858–1919) and Rose Fox (1867–1940).

Gordon was trained as a singer by Albert Ham. She got her big break in July 1919. She was called to New York City and offered a three-year Metropolitan Opera contract by Giulio Gatti-Casazza. Shortly after signing her contract she changed her name to Jeanne Gordon. Her debut performance was as Azucena in Il trovatore on 22 November 1919. In 1919, she created the roles of the Fairy and Madame Berlingot in L'oiseau bleu by Albert Wolff in its world premiere.

Gordon recorded 78s for Columbia and Victor in the 1920s.

She made guest appearances with the Opéra de Monte-Carlo in 1928.

In 1933 she had a nervous breakdown. She died of a heart attack at age 67 in Macon, Missouri on February 22, 1952.

In 2022 she was inaugurated into the Chatham-Kent Cultural Hall of Fame as part of its inaugural class.
