= Baldoon Mystery =

Legendary Canadian ghost story

The Baldoon Mystery is a legendary ghost story that is part of the folklore of Wallaceburg, Ontario.

== Legend ==
According to the tale, the family farm of local resident John T. McDonald was disturbed by a haunting attributed to the curse from a witch; they heard noises of people marching through their kitchen, saw bullets and stones come through windows, and witnessed fires starting around the house. The McDonalds enlisted the aid of a woman who told them to make a bullet out of silver and shoot a black-headed goose with it, and if they wounded the bird, the witch would be wounded also. After McDonald used the bullet to break the wing of the goose, he encountered an old woman seated in a rocking chair on her front porch with a broken arm, and after that point, there were no more disturbances at the McDonald farm.
