= 2012–13 Michigan Wolverines men's basketball team =

American college basketball season

2012–13 Michigan Wolverines men's basketball

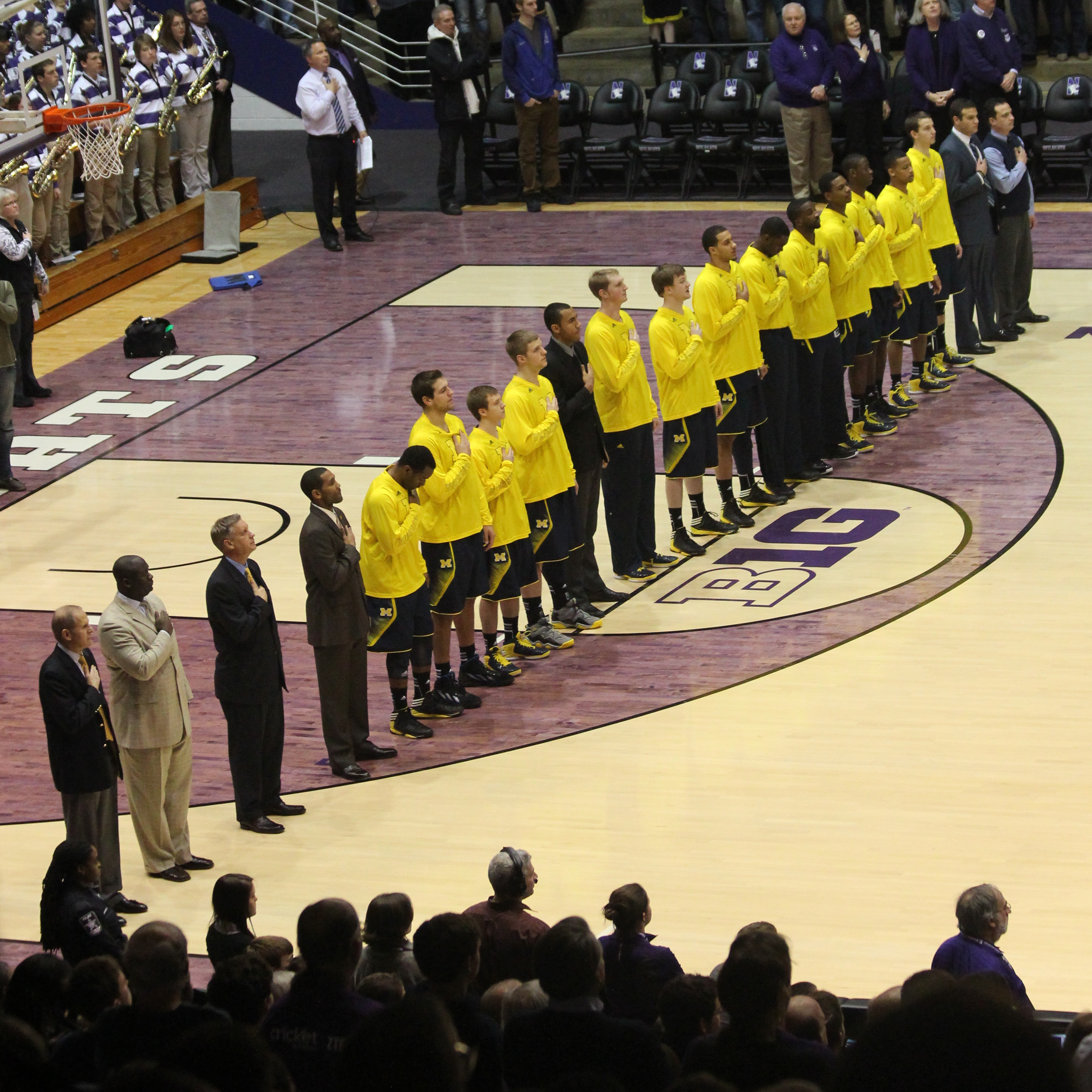

NCAA tournament, Runner-up NIT Season Tip-Off champions

National Championship Game, L 76–82 vs. Louisville
- Conference: Big Ten Conference

Ranking
- Coaches: No. 2
- AP: No. 10-t
- Record: 31–8 (12–6 Big Ten)
- Head coach: John Beilein (6th season)
- Assistant coaches: Jeff Meyer; LaVall Jordan; Bacari Alexander
- MVP: Trey Burke
- Captain: Josh Bartelstein
- Home arena: Crisler Center

2012–13 Big Ten Conference men's basketball standings
	Conf.				Overall
Team	W		L	PCT	W		L	PCT
No. 4 Indiana	14	–	4	.778	29	–	7	.806
No. 7 Ohio State †	13	–	5	.722	29	–	8	.784
No. 9 Michigan State	13	–	5	.722	27	–	9	.750
No. 10 Michigan	12	–	6	.667	31	–	8	.795
No. 18 Wisconsin	12	–	6	.667	23	–	12	.657
Iowa	9	–	9	.500	25	–	13	.658
Illinois	8	–	10	.444	23	–	13	.639
Minnesota	8	–	10	.444	21	–	13	.618
Purdue	8	–	10	.444	16	–	18	.471
Nebraska	5	–	13	.278	15	–	18	.455
Northwestern	4	–	14	.222	13	–	19	.406
Penn State	2	–	16	.111	10	–	21	.323
† 2013 Big Ten tournament winner Rankings from AP Poll

The 2012–13 Michigan Wolverines men's basketball team represented the University of Michigan during the 2012–13 NCAA Division I men's basketball season. The team played its home games in Ann Arbor, Michigan, at the Crisler Center. This season marked the team's 96th consecutive year as a member of the Big Ten Conference, and it is occasionally referred to as "Team 96". The team was led by sixth-year head coach John Beilein.

As the defending 2011–12 Big Ten Conference men's basketball season regular season co-champions, the Wolverines finished fourth in the conference in 2012–13 and as National Runner-up in the 2013 NCAA Division I men's basketball tournament after losing in the championship game to Louisville (Louisville's championship was later vacated due to a sex scandal, which ruled multiple players ineligible). The team achieved a 31–8 record, the most wins by the program in 20 seasons.

Following the 2011–12 season, the team lost graduating senior captains Zack Novak and Stu Douglass, who moved on to professional basketball careers in Europe. The incoming class of Mitch McGary, Glenn Robinson III and Nik Stauskas was ranked among the best classes in the nation by the media. With its new lineup, the team matched the greatest starts in school history. Starting the season with 11 consecutive wins matched the best start since Michigan's 1989 national champions, the 1988–89 team. At 16–0, Michigan matched its best start since the last repeat Big Ten Regular season championship, the 1985–86 team, tying a school record. Reaching 19–1 set a record for the best start in school history. The team also reached the number one position in the AP Poll for the first time since the Fab Five 1992–93 team. The team entered February with a 20–1 record (7–1 Big Ten), but with an injury to eventual B1G All-Defensive selection Jordan Morgan and a stretch of games against its strongest conference opponents, Michigan lost three out of four games. The team closed the season with a 5–5 run to finish tied for fourth in the conference and won one game in the Big Ten tournament before being eliminated.

The team was led by 2013 national player of the year, Big Ten Player of the Year and 2013 Consensus All-American Trey Burke and three additional All-Conference honorees. Tim Hardaway Jr. was named to the 2012–13 All-Big Ten first team by the coaches and to the second team by the media; Robinson was named an honorable mention All-Big Ten by the media, and Morgan was an All-Big Ten Defensive team selection. Stauskas and McGary earned multiple Big Ten Freshman of the Week recognitions during the season. Burke was the second National Player of the Year and eighth first-team consensus All-American in Michigan basketball history.

Michigan entered the 2013 NCAA Division I men's basketball tournament as the youngest team in the field. The team made its first Sweet Sixteen appearance since the 1993–94 team did so. The Wolverines made their first appearance in the Final Four and the national title game since 1993 (which was vacated along with their 1992 appearance due to a scandal involving the eligibility of Chris Webber). Following the season, at the 2013 NBA draft, Burke and Hardaway were selected ninth and twenty-fourth, respectively, becoming the first pair of first-round NBA draft choices from Michigan since the 1994 NBA draft.

== Preseason roster changes ==
=== Departures ===
The team lost both of its captains from the prior season to graduation after they completed their eligibility. Senior two-time captain Douglass turned pro, joining Basket Navarra Club of the Liga Española de Baloncesto. Senior three-time captain Novak graduated to play for Landstede Basketbal in the Dutch Basketball League. In addition to the loss of senior co-captains, the team lost three players who decided to transfer: Evan Smotrycz, Carlton Brundidge and Colton Christian. Smotrycz, who transferred to Maryland, had started in 42 of the 69 games he played during his first two years. He left the program as the fifth-best all-time three-point shooter with a percentage of 40.5. Brundidge transferred to Detroit and Christian transferred to Florida International. The program also announced the departure of walk-on Sai Tummala and the return of walk-on Corey Person for a fifth year.

Name	Number	Pos.	Height	Weight	Year	Hometown	Notes
Stu Douglass	1	PG	6'3"	200	Senior	Carmel, Indiana	Graduated
Zack Novak	0	SG	6'4"	210	Senior	Chesterton, Indiana	Graduated
Evan Smotrycz	23	F	6'9"	230	Sophomore	Reading, Massachusetts	Transferred to Maryland
Carlton Brundidge	2	SG	6'1"	190	Freshman	Southfield, Michigan	Transferred to Detroit
Colton Christian	45	F	6'6"	215	Sophomore	Bellevue, Washington	Transferred to Florida International
Sai Tummala	24	F	6'6"	190	Senior	Phoenix, Arizona	Left program

=== 2012–13 team recruits ===
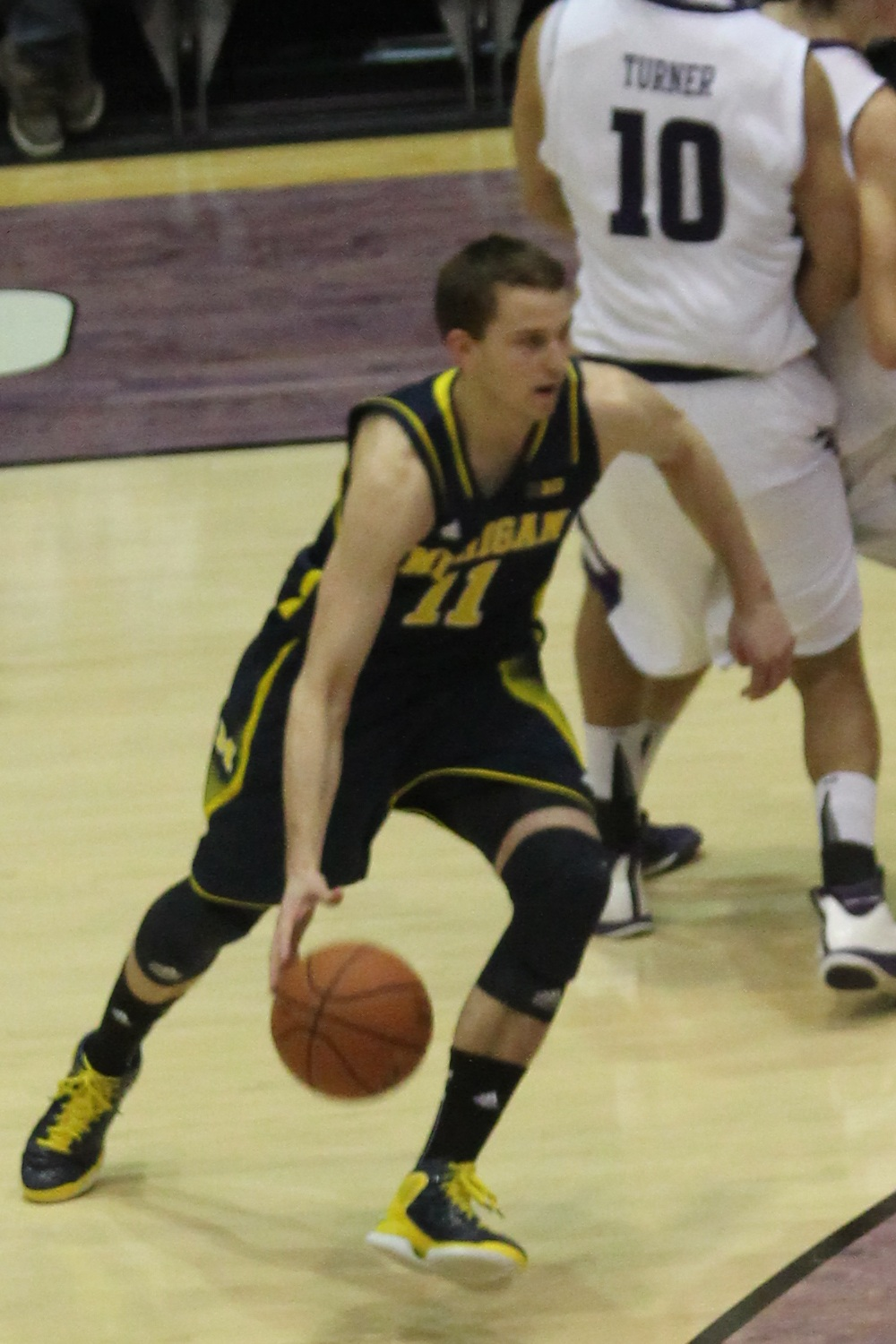
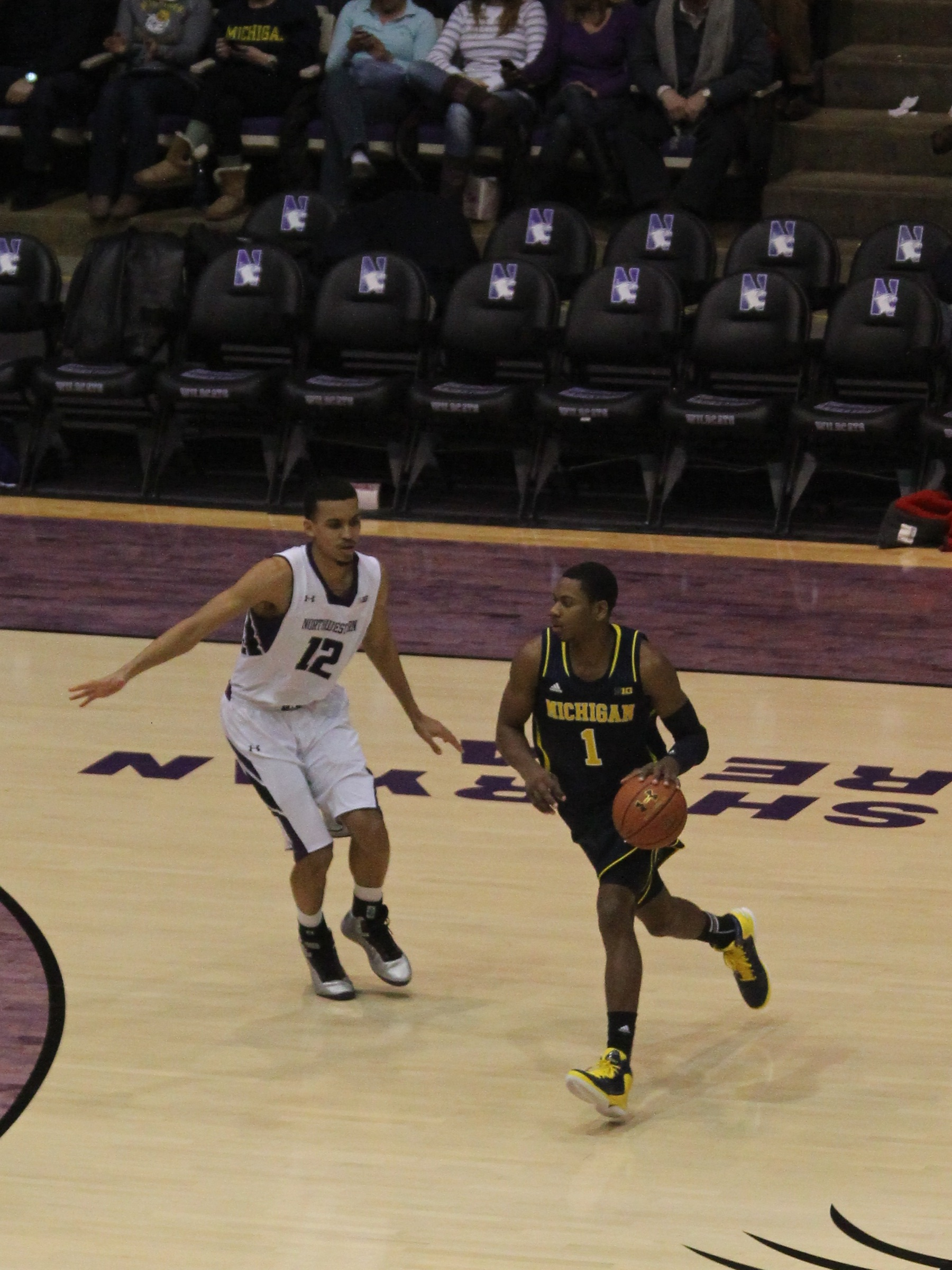
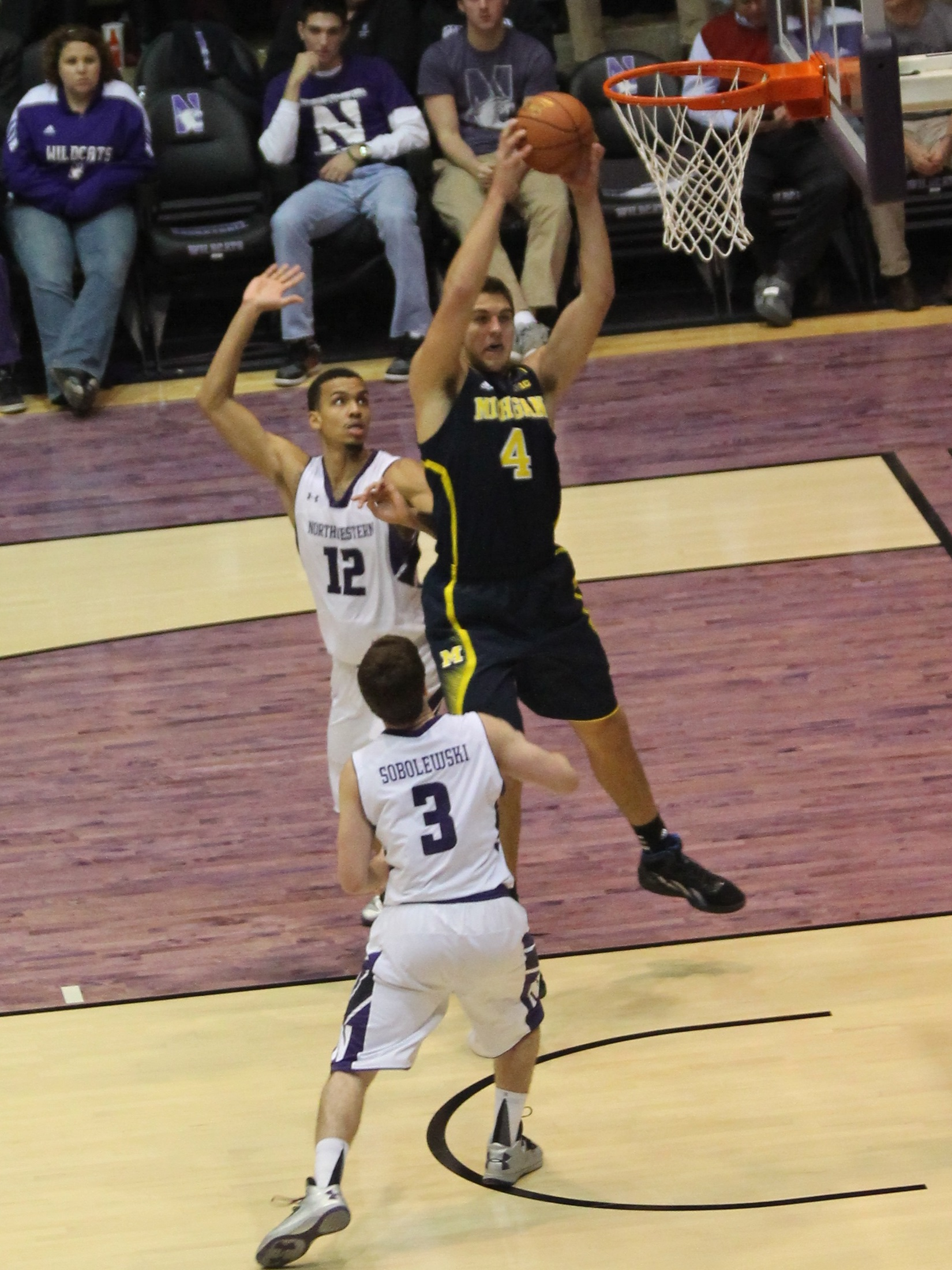
Nik Stauskas, Glenn Robinson III, and Mitch McGary in action in the 2012–13 Big Ten Conference men's basketball season opener on January 3 against Northwestern. Each went on to earn multiple Big Ten Freshman of the week accolades.

Glenn Robinson III, son of former first overall NBA draft pick Glenn Robinson, verbally committed on September 14, 2010, as the first commitment in Michigan's class of 2012. On March 26, 2011, Michigan received its second verbal commitment of the class of 2012 from Canadian wing guard Nik Stauskas. On November 3, Mitch McGary, who was ranked as the number two prospect in the nation at the time, announced his verbal commitment to Michigan. Within hours of the commitment, ESPN announced that Michigan ranked as the fifth best class in the nation. Each of the three signed a National Letter of Intent with the team on November 9. After several other schools announced their commitments, the signing of McGary moved Michigan from outside the top 25 at the end of October to the number 7 class in the nation by mid-November, according to ESPN. That November, McGary, Robinson and Stauskas ranked 3, 34, and 79, respectively, in the Rivals.com Class of 2012 Top 150.

All three recruits had playoff success: McGary was a member of Brewster Academy's National Prep Championship team. Stauskas earned the championship game MVP of the NEPSAC Class AA Championship after leading St. Mark's to victory. Robinson led Lake Central to its first Indiana High School Athletic Association sectional title in 15 years. He earned the Post-Tribune's Boys basketball player of the year award for Northwest Indiana and the state MVP from the Indiana Basketball News.

McGary was invited to participate in the four-team April 1, 2012 All-American Championship, along with future teammate Robinson in New Orleans. Robinson was awarded the ESPNHS All-American Championship Player of the Game for his 16-point, 4-rebound performance, which included 5 dunks among his 6-for-7 shooting night. McGary was also selected to represent USA Basketball at the fifteenth annual Nike Hoops Summit on April 7 as part of the 2012 USA Junior National Select Team.

Michael "Spike" Albrecht committed to Michigan on April 6, 2012. Albrecht led Northfield Mount Hermon School to the 2012 NEPSAC Class AAA Boys' Basketball Tournament, defeating McGary's Brewster Academy in the semifinals. Albrecht was MVP of the tournament. Albrecht was a former AAU teammate of McGary and Robinson. Albrecht's and outgoing captain Novak's fathers were collegiate teammates. Albrecht was a 2011 graduate of Crown Point High School. After most of the big signings announced their decisions on the April 11 signing day, Michigan was ranked as the early number 5 preseason selection as a team by ESPN.

College recruiting information
Name	Hometown	School	Height	Weight	Commit date
Mitch McGary; PF	Chesterton, Indiana	Brewster Academy (NH)	6 ft 10 in (2.08 m)	247.5 lb (112.3 kg)	Mar 11, 2011
Mitch McGary; PF	Recruit ratings: Scout: Rivals: (96)				
Glenn Robinson III; SF	St. John, Indiana	Lake Central High School	6 ft 7 in (2.01 m)	198.5 lb (90.0 kg)	Sep 14, 2010
Glenn Robinson III; SF	Recruit ratings: Scout: Rivals: (97)				
Nik Stauskas; SF/SG	Mississauga, Ontario	St. Mark's School (MA)	6 ft 5 in (1.96 m)	192.5 lb (87.3 kg)	Mar 26, 2011
Nik Stauskas; SF/SG	Recruit ratings: Scout: Rivals: (92)				
Caris LeVert; SG	Pickerington, Ohio	Pickerington High School Central (OH)	6 ft 4 in (1.93 m)	175 lb (79 kg)	Dec 5, 2012
Caris LeVert; SG	Recruit ratings: Scout: Rivals: (87)				
Spike Albrecht; PG	Crown Point, Indiana	Crown Point High School (IN)/ Northfield Mount Hermon School (MA)	6 ft 0.5 in (1.84 m)	180 lb (82 kg)	Jun 4, 2012
Spike Albrecht; PG	Recruit ratings: Rivals: (79)				
Overall recruit ranking: Scout: 9 Rivals: 7 ESPN: 14
Note: In many cases, Scout, Rivals, 247Sports, On3, and ESPN may conflict in their listings of height and weight.; In these cases, the average was taken. ESPN grades are on a 100-point scale.; Sources: "Michigan 2012 Basketball Commitments". Rivals.; "2012 Michigan Basketball Commits". Scout.; "ESPN Recruiting Nation Basketball". ESPN.; "Scout.com Team Recruiting Rankings". Scout.; "2012 Team Ranking". Rivals.

== 2013–14 team recruits ==
Zak Irvin was named 2013 Indiana Mr. Basketball, giving Hamilton Southeastern High School the state's first back-to-back winners (Gary Harris) from the same high school. Derrick Walton was runner up in the 2013 Mr. Basketball of Michigan by a 2130–2086 margin to Iowa State signee Monte Morris despite having one more first place vote. Both Walton and Irvin were 2013 Parade All-American honorees and were named state Boys Basketball Gatorade Player of the Year.

College recruiting information
Name	Hometown	School	Height	Weight	Commit date
Derrick Walton; PG	Detroit, MI	Chandler Park Academy	6 ft 0 in (1.83 m)	172.5 lb (78.2 kg)	Jan 8, 2011
Derrick Walton; PG	Recruit ratings: Scout: Rivals: (89)				
Zak Irvin; SF	Fishers, IN	Hamilton Southeastern High School	6 ft 5.5 in (1.97 m)	177.5 lb (80.5 kg)	Jul 31, 2011
Zak Irvin; SF	Recruit ratings: Scout: Rivals: (91)				
Mark Donnal; PF	Whitehouse, OH	Anthony Wayne High School	6 ft 9 in (2.06 m)	207.5 lb (94.1 kg)	Jun 23, 2011
Mark Donnal; PF	Recruit ratings: Scout: Rivals: (82)				
Andrew Dakich; PG	Zionsville, IN	Zionsville Community High School	6 ft 2 in (1.88 m)	160 lb (73 kg)	Apr 29, 2013
Andrew Dakich; PG	Recruit ratings: (59)				
Cole McConnell; SG	Atherton, CA	Sacred Heart Prep; New Hampton School	6 ft 4 in (1.93 m)	200 lb (91 kg)	Mar 14, 2013
Cole McConnell; SG	Recruit ratings: No ratings found				
Overall recruit ranking: Scout: 16 Rivals: 12 ESPN: 12
Note: In many cases, Scout, Rivals, 247Sports, On3, and ESPN may conflict in their listings of height and weight.; In these cases, the average was taken. ESPN grades are on a 100-point scale.; Sources: "Michigan 2013 Basketball Commitments". Rivals.; "2013 Michigan Basketball Commits". Scout.; "ESPN Recruiting Nation Basketball". ESPN.; "Scout.com Team Recruiting Rankings". Scout.; "2013 Team Ranking". Rivals.

== Roster ==
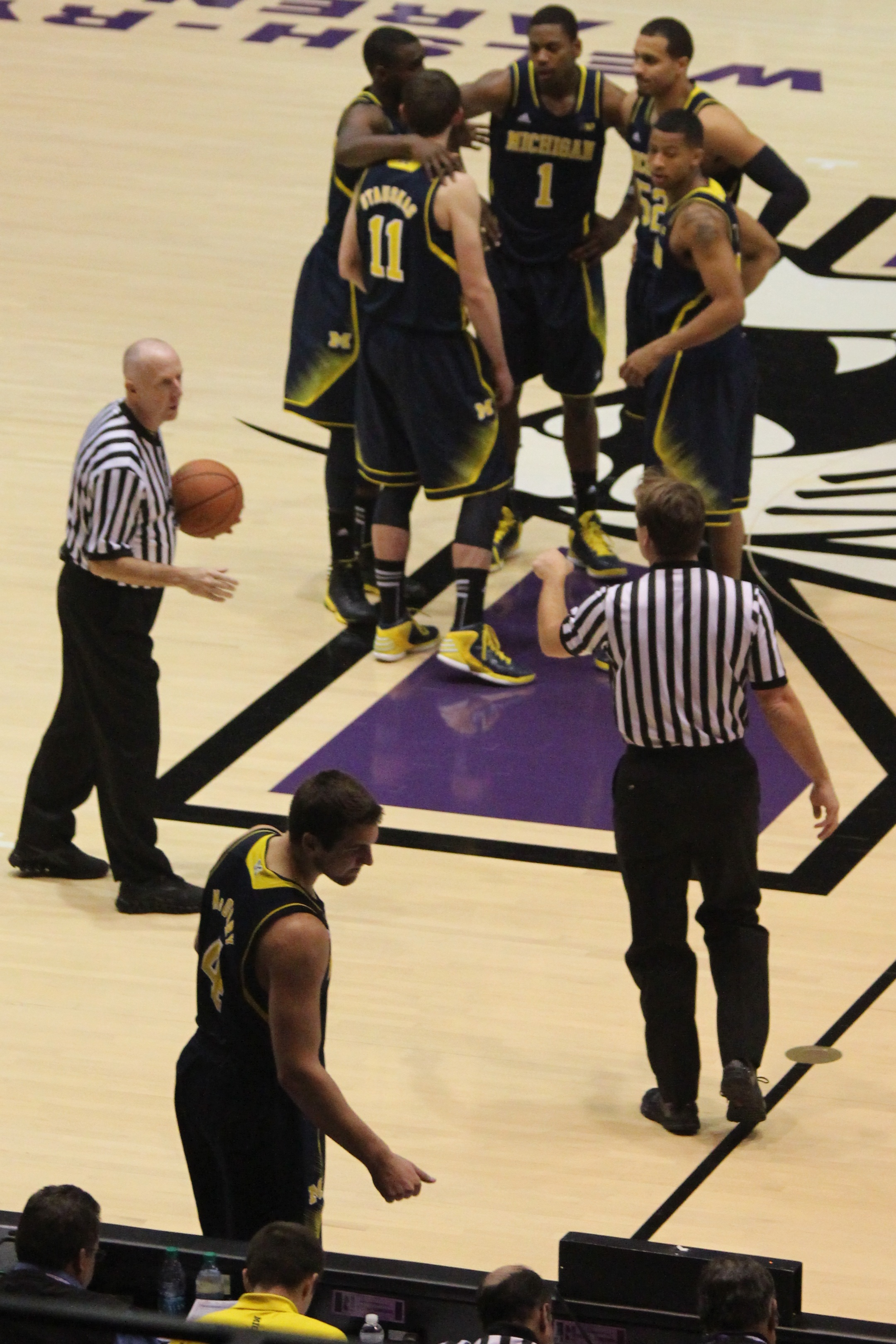
Sixth man Mitch McGary checking into the Wolverines's Big Ten Conference season opener at Welsh-Ryan Arena (starters in background clockwise from front: Stauskas, Hardaway Jr., Robinson III, Morgan, and Burke)

2012–13 Michigan Wolverines men's basketball team
Players
Coaches

Pos.	#	Name	Height	Weight	Year	Hometown
F	1	Glenn Robinson III	6 ft 6 in (1.98 m)	210 lb (95 kg)	Fr	St. John, IN
G	2	Spike Albrecht	5 ft 11 in (1.8 m)	170 lb (77 kg)	Fr	Crown Point, IN
G	3	Trey Burke	6 ft 0 in (1.83 m)	190 lb (86 kg)	So	Columbus, OH
F	4	Mitch McGary	6 ft 10 in (2.08 m)	250 lb (113 kg)	Fr	Chesterton, IN
G	5	Eso Akunne	6 ft 2 in (1.88 m)	225 lb (102 kg)	Sr	Ann Arbor, MI
G	10	Tim Hardaway Jr.	6 ft 6 in (1.98 m)	205 lb (93 kg)	Jr	Miami, FL
G	11	Nik Stauskas	6 ft 6 in (1.98 m)	190 lb (86 kg)	Fr	Mississauga, ON
G	13	Matt Vogrich	6 ft 4 in (1.93 m)	200 lb (91 kg)	Sr	Lake Forest, IL
F	15	Jon Horford	6 ft 10 in (2.08 m)	250 lb (113 kg)	RS So	Grand Ledge, MI
G	20	Josh Bartelstein (C)	6 ft 3 in (1.91 m)	210 lb (95 kg)	Sr	Highland Park, IL
F	22	Blake McLimans	6 ft 10 in (2.08 m)	240 lb (109 kg)	Sr	Hamburg, NY
G	23	Caris LeVert	6 ft 5 in (1.96 m)	170 lb (77 kg)	Fr	Pickerington, OH
F	32	Corey Person (W)	6 ft 3 in (1.91 m)	210 lb (95 kg)	RS Sr	Kalamazoo, MI
F	44	Max Bielfeldt	6 ft 7 in (2.01 m)	245 lb (111 kg)	RS Fr	Peoria, IL
C	52	Jordan Morgan	6 ft 8 in (2.03 m)	250 lb (113 kg)	RS Jr	Detroit, MI

Head coach

- John Beilein (Wheeling)

Assistant coach(es)

- Jeff Meyer (Taylor)
- LaVall Jordan (Butler)
- Bacari Alexander (Detroit Mercy)

Legend

- (C) Team captain
- (S) Suspended
- (I) Ineligible
- (W) Walk-on
- Injured
- Current redshirt

Roster

== Preseason ==
Michigan basketball hosted its on campus media day press conference on October 10, 2012, at Crisler Center. The team was represented by Burke, Hardaway, Morgan and Beilein at the Big Ten Conference Basketball Media Day press conference on October 24 in Rosemont, Illinois. When the 24-person Big Ten Media poll was announced, Michigan was predicted to finish second to Indiana. Burke was a preseason All-Conference selection by the same media.

Michigan enjoyed high expectations from the national media as well during the preseason. Sporting News named them to the number 5 position in its preseason poll, while conference foes Indiana and Ohio State were ranked number 1 and 3, respectively. Michigan also earned the number 5 ranking in both the preseason Coaches' Poll and preseason Associated Press poll, but behind Indiana (#1) and Ohio State (#4) in both. This was Michigan's highest preseason ranking since the 1992–93 team. Sports Illustrated ranked Michigan number 9 in its October preseason power rankings, again behind Indiana (#1) and Ohio State (#6), but when it printed its November preseason poll listed Michigan at number 6 ahead of Ohio State (#7), but behind Indiana (#1). Prior to the first exhibition game on November 1, senior Josh Bartelstein was named team captain.

ESPN's Eamonn Brennan noted that Michigan was a perimeter oriented team with possibly the best one-two guard combination in the country. Burke and Hardaway were both preseason John R. Wooden Award top 50 selections. Burke was a preseason All-American (Associated Press first team, CBS Sports second team, Sports Illustrated second team, ESPN second team, Sporting News third team) as well as a preseason Naismith Award top 50 selection.

== Slogans, nicknames and emblems ==
=== WE ON ===
The acronym "WE ON" was the slogan for the whole team for the 2012–13 season. The team and coaching staff selected it at the beginning of the season as another way for Michigan to say Bo Schembechler's famous quote, "the Team, the Team, the Team." The acronym "WE ON" stands for "When Everyone Operates N'sync." Michigan assistant coach Bacari Alexander even tweeted that the acronym summarizes this team-focused mindset. According to Dave Brandon, assistant coach LaVall Jordan and director of basketball operations Travis Conlan guided the team to develop the slogan.

Adidas warm up shirts were created and were first worn on November 21, 2012, before Michigan's NIT Season Tip-Off game against the Pittsburgh Panthers. The shirts use the school colors with blue with maize lettering. On February 12, 2013, when Michigan played the first of two regularly scheduled rivalry games against Michigan State, students in the Izzone at the Breslin Center wore T-shirts with "YOU OFF" printed in Spartan colors (green and white). Michigan State went on to win the game by 23 points.

"WE" – WE is also an acronym for "Wolverine Excellence", which is chiefly used by the team. Wolverine Excellence calls for players and managers to focus on its five core values: integrity, unity, passion, diligence and appreciation.

"ON" – ON represented each player's individual commitment to season-long improvement. There was a "U-M Fuse Box" (mock-University of Michigan set of switches) in the Men's Basketball locker room in Crisler Center. Each player had selected one word on which to focus during the season and before every practice and game, each player flipped his switch "on". This represented each player's commitment to improvement every day.

=== Fresh Five ===
Prior to the season, the five freshmen were dubbed the "Fresh Five", a moniker hearkening remembrance of the incoming freshman class of 1991, known as the Fab Five, that led Michigan to back-to-back Championship games while starting the majority of games. However, the nickname and its expectations were downplayed most of the season by the team. Nonetheless, during the final two weeks of the regular season The New York Times ran a feature story on the team that reinvigorated the nickname while noting that the current five were the supporting cast rather than the stars of the team like the original five.

=== Canadian flag ===
The maize and blue Michigan Wolverines colored Flag of Canada used to cheer on Nik Stauskas

ESPN's Chantel Jennings tweeted a picture of a Flag of Canada redone in Michigan's team colors of maize and blue at Crisler Arena on December 4. One of her followers noted that the big version on the wall was a general Stauskas fan flag and that a little version of the flag was added next to it for each three-pointer Canadian Stauskas made in the game. By mid-December of his freshman season, the students in the Maize Rage (Michigan student section at Crisler Arena) had begun cheering Stauskas on with such a flag. The Michigan Public & Media Relations office started mentioning the flag before Christmas. The flag was mentioned widely in the press as he continued his hot shooting into January. Through the first week of January, Stauskas was shooting 53.7% on three-point shots as the team held a 15–0 record.

=== 96 ===
The team, which represented Michigan Basketball for the ninety-sixth season in the Big Ten Conference, is sometimes referred to as Team 96 or Squad 96. Although this team represented Michigan for the ninety-sixth consecutive year, there was controversy as to whether the team should in fact be marketed as Team 96 because the 1908–09 Michigan Wolverines men's basketball team was not properly accounted for among the prior teams. The subsequent team was marketed as Team 98.

== Schedule ==
=== Regular season ===
==== November ====
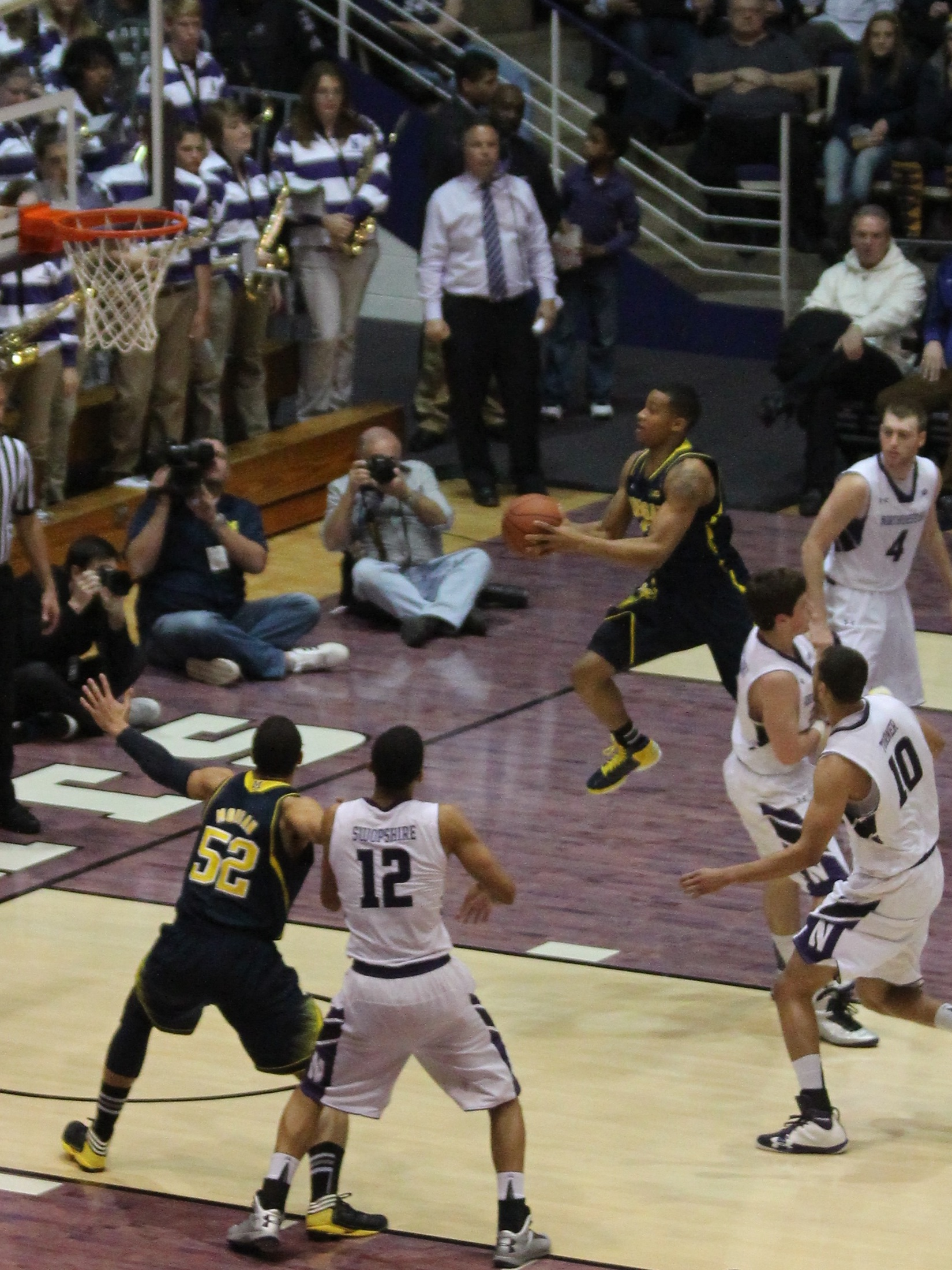
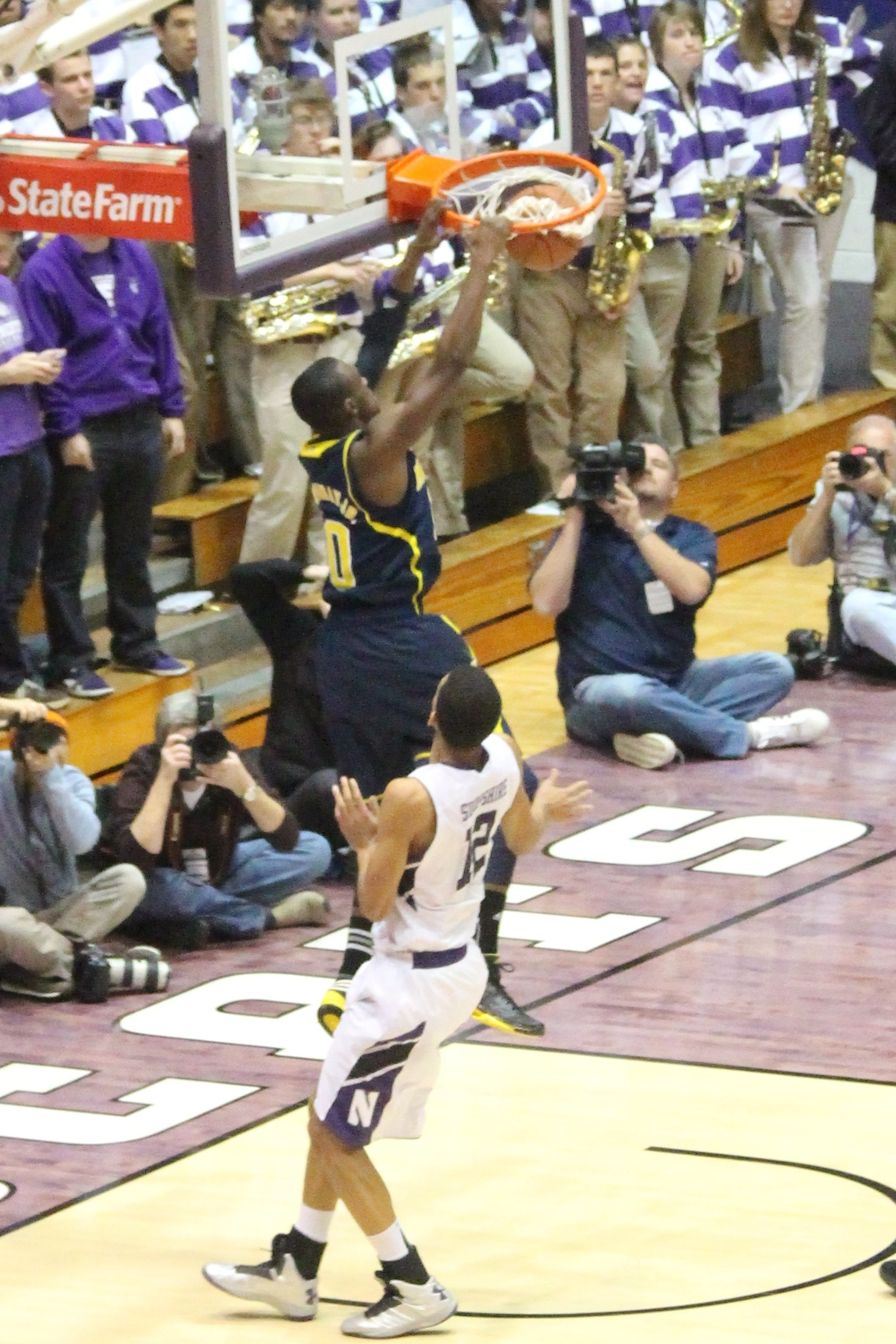
Trey Burke (left) and Tim Hardaway Jr. (right) led Michigan in scoring and each earned multiple Big Ten Player of the Week awards.

Hardaway began the season with his fourth career double-double by scoring 25 points (including 5-for-5 three-point shooting) and adding 10 rebounds in a 100–62 win over Slippery Rock; this earned him his second career Big Ten Player of the Week award. The 100-point performance of November 9 was Michigan's first since the 2007–08 team posted 103 points against Oakland on December 12, 2007.

Michigan hosted games for the first two rounds of the 2012 NIT Season Tip-Off. The team's first game of the tournament, a November 12 contest against the IUPUI Jaguars, resulted in a 91–54 Michigan victory. The win also gave Michigan its first consecutive 90-point performances since the 2000–01 team recorded three consecutive 90-point games. The following night, Michigan defeated Cleveland State by a 77–47 margin, marking the first time the school opened the season with three consecutive 30-point victories. The win also marked the first time Michigan had posted three consecutive 30-point wins since the 1988–89 Wolverines team (the 1989 national champion) won five consecutive 30-point games.

In the championship rounds of the NIT Season Tip-Off tournament at Madison Square Garden on November 21 and 23, Michigan defeated Pittsburgh and Kansas State, respectively, to win the tournament. Hardaway, who totaled 39 points at the Garden, was the tournament MVP and was joined on the all-tournament team by Burke, who contributed 27 points and 10 assists. Stauskas earned Big Ten Freshman of the Week honors for his NIT tournament performance in which he averaged 12.5 points and 4.5 rebounds. On November 27, Michigan raised its Big Ten championship banner from the season before. Then, the team defeated its first ranked opponent of the season – NC State (#18 AP/#18 Coaches) – in the ACC–Big Ten Challenge. The win was supported by Burke's first career double-double which included a career-high 11 assists, no turnovers and 18 points as well as a career-high 20 points from Stauskas in a 79–72 victory.

==== December ====
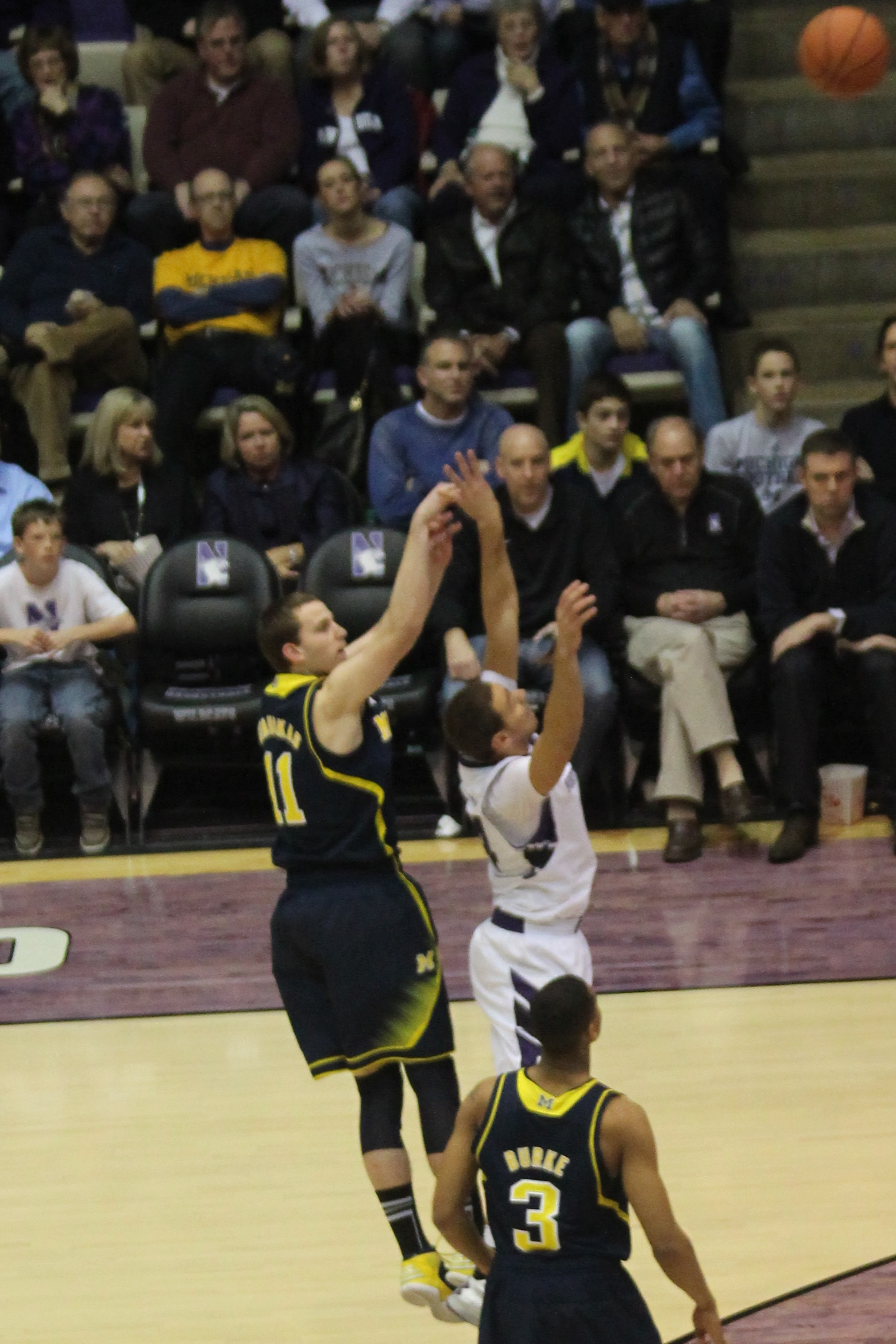
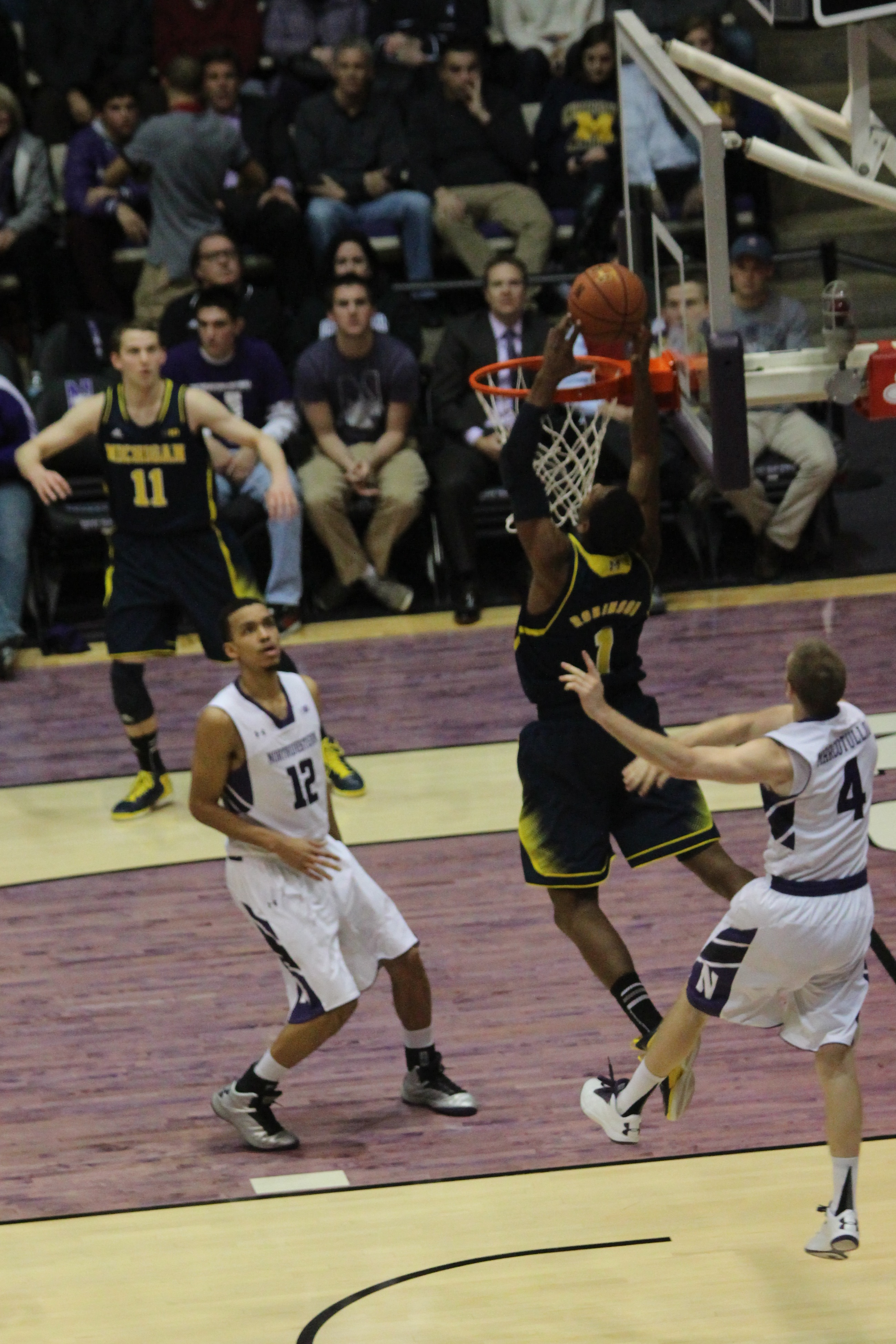
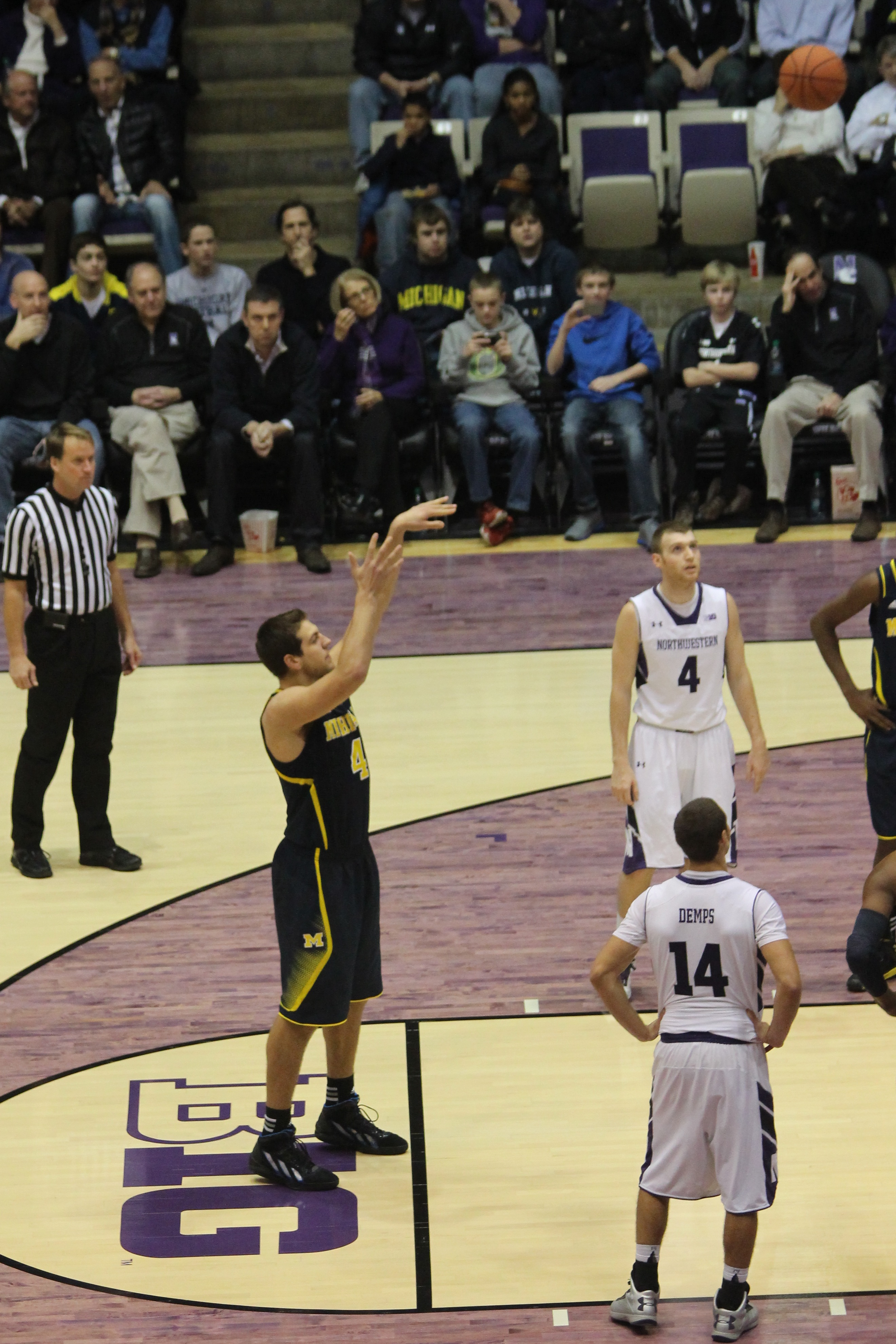
Nik Stauskas (left), Glenn Robinson III (center) and Mitch McGary (right) each earned multiple Big Ten Freshman of the Week awards.

Ranked third in both polls, Michigan established a record as the highest ranked visiting team in the history of Carver Arena on December 1. Giving Stauskas his first career start, Michigan emerged victorious over Bradley. It was the third game of the season that Michigan never trailed in. Stauskas repeated as Big Ten Freshman of the Week on December 3 for his back-to-back 20-point performances.

On December 4, Michigan defeated Western Michigan 73–41, giving the team its first 8–0 start since the 1996–97 team; the team never trailed in the game. Michigan defeated Arkansas 80–67 in its December 8 matchup. It marked the fourth 9–0 start in school history (1988–89, 1985–86 and 1926–27) and the third consecutive game that Michigan never trailed. Michigan went to 10–0 on December 11 by defeating Binghamton 67–39.

Michigan traveled to play in the December 15 Brooklyn Hoops Winter Festival at the Barclays Center, where they defeated West Virginia (coach Beilein's previous employer) 81–66 to move to 11–0 for the third time in school history (1985–86 and 1988–89). The team never trailed in the contest. For averaging 23.0 points, 6.5 assists, 4.5 rebounds and 2.0 steals with only 1.0 turnover in the games against Binghamton and West Virginia, Burke earned Player of the Week on December 17.

On December 20, the team became the second in school in history (1985–86 went 16–0) to reach 12–0 when it beat Eastern Michigan. After recording his first career double-double in the game with only 18 minutes of play, McGary was recognized as Big Ten Freshman of the Week. Hardaway suffered an ankle injury that caused him to miss the December 29 game against Central Michigan and that broke his 81 consecutive games played streak that went back to the beginning of his Michigan career. The game also marked the team's second game without Jon Horford, who dislocated his knee during the West Virginia game. In Hardaway's absence, Burke posted his second career double-double with 22 points and a career-high tying 11 assists and Robinson posted his second career 20-point game. Stauskas added career highs with 5 three-pointers and 7 rebounds and earned his third Big Ten Freshman of the Week award on December 31. The thirteenth win clinched Michigan's ninth perfect non-conference regular season record. The team never trailed in the contest.

==== January ====
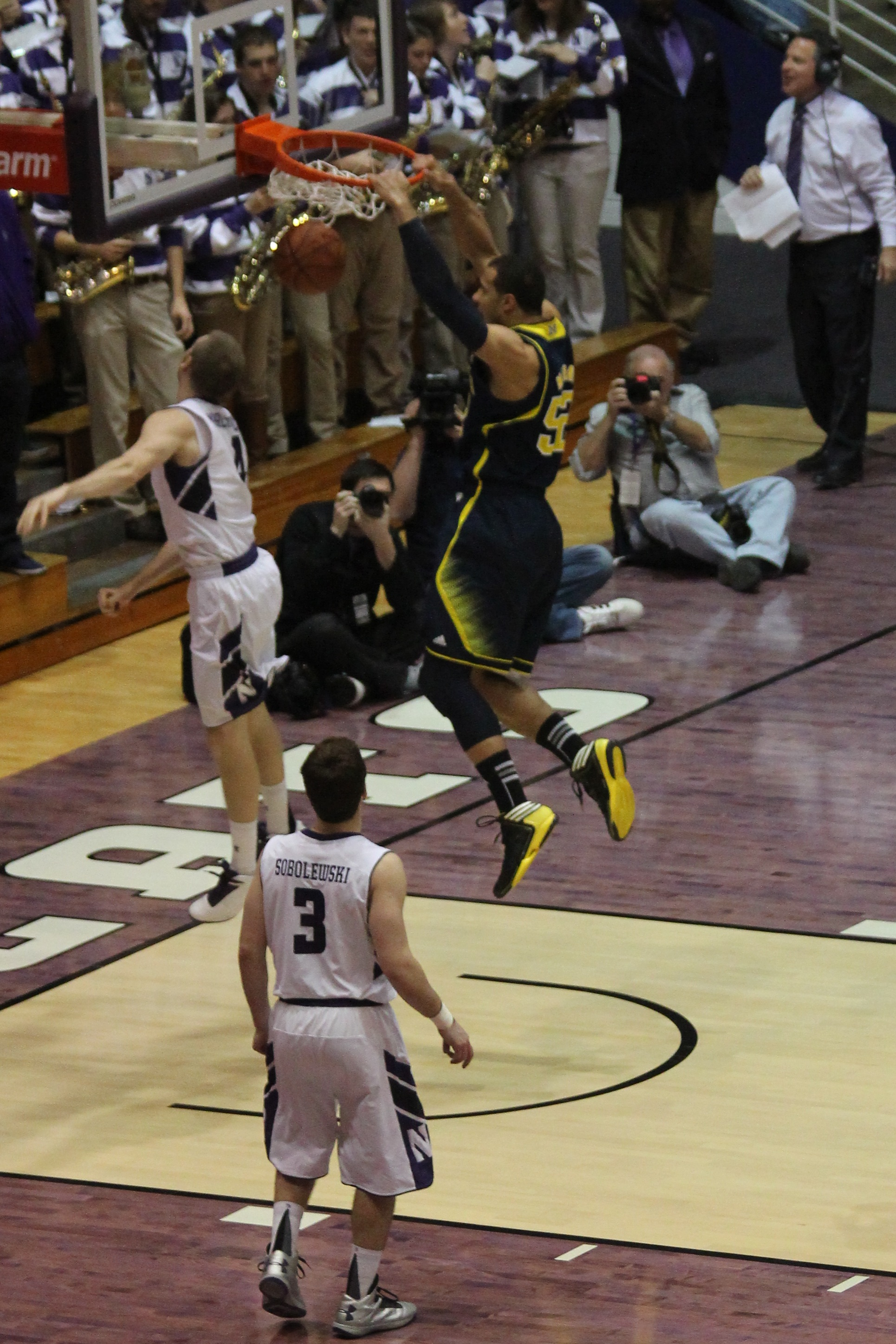
Starting center Jordan Morgan

On January 3, Michigan opened the 2012–13 Big Ten conference schedule with a 94–66 win over Northwestern to move to 14–0. Burke had 23 points, 5 assists and a career high 4 steals, while Hardaway added 21 points, Morgan posted a double-double with 12 points and 13 rebounds, while Stauskas and Robinson added 10 points each. Burke and Robinson both posted their third and first career double-doubles, respectively, in a 95–67 victory against Iowa on January 6. It marked the first time that the team scored 90 points in back-to-back conference games since the 1999–2000 team and tied for the most points in a conference game since the 1997–98 team. On January 7, Burke was recognized as Big Ten Conference Player of the Week and Robinson was recognized as Conference Freshman of the Week.

The team tied the school record for best start by defeating Nebraska for its 16th straight victory to start the season on January 9. The victory also marked Beilein's 400th Division I coaching victory. On January 13, the team lost to Ohio State (#15 AP/#14 Coaches) snapping their winning streak. Horford returned to the lineup after missing 5 games. Michigan had been the only remaining unbeaten team and was expected to be ranked #1 if they had won. The loss was Michigan's 9th straight in Columbus.

Michigan defeated Minnesota (#9 AP/#12 Coaches) at Williams Arena on January 17, marking the first time Michigan defeated a top-10 team on the road since a December 6, 1996, victory by the 1996–97 team over Duke. After his performance, in which he scored 21 points while making 7 of 8 shots and 4 of 5 three-point shots, in addition to recording 5 rebounds, 3 assists, 3 steals and 2 blocks, Hardaway earned a second Big Ten Player of the Week Award.

Michigan defeated Purdue 68–53 on January 24 and Illinois 74–60 on January 27. This gave Michigan the first 19–1 start in school history. Robinson earned his second Big Ten Freshman of the Week award on January 28 for a pair of 12-point performances during a week in which he averaged 8 rebounds while maintaining 71.4% field goal percentage. Later that day, Michigan was ranked number one in the AP Poll with 51 of the 65 first place votes. It marked the first time Michigan ranked atop the AP Poll since the Fab Five 1992–93 team did so on December 5, 1992.

Michigan concluded January by beating Northwestern a second time on January 30, becoming the first team in the country to reach 20 wins. After enduring an injured ankle against Illinois, starting center Jordan Morgan missed his first game since redshirting a full season for the 2009–10 Wolverines when he sat out the Northwestern game. Horford started in his place.

==== February ====
On February 2, 2013, Michigan (#1 AP/#2 Coaches) appeared on ESPN's College GameDay against Indiana (#3 AP/#3 Coaches) who hosted the game at Assembly Hall. Michigan lost 81–73, but the television broadcast of the game on ESPN set a Big Ten record for viewership with 4.035 million viewers. Morgan only played two minutes behind replacement starter Horford. Michigan then defeated Ohio State (#10 AP/#10 Coaches) in overtime in the rematch at home on February 5. Starting center Morgan only played 4 minutes. Coach Beilein noted that Morgan's absence affected the team's ability to match up defensively and substitute as it desired.

Michigan lost to Wisconsin on February 9 in overtime following a half-court buzzer beater by Wisconsin that tied the game in regulation It marked Michigan's eleventh consecutive loss against Wisconsin on the road. Morgan did not play, but McGary played 32 minutes, totaling 12 points, 3 steals and 8 rebounds. However, dramatically increased play in Morgan's absence enabled McGary to earn his second Big Ten Freshman of the Week honor on February 11.

On February 12, Michigan lost 75–52 in its rivalry game against (#8 AP/#8 Coaches) Michigan State. Among those in attendance were Rick Snyder, Matthew Stafford, Mark Dantonio, Brady Hoke, and Lloyd Carr. It marked the first time both teams were ranked in the top ten of the AP Poll, and resulted in Michigan losing back-to-back games and three consecutive road games for the first time since the 2010–11 team did so. Burke's 18 points, 4 assists and 3 steals were one of Michigan's few bright spots in their February 12 contest.

On February 17 against Penn State, Burke posted a season-high 29 points along with 5 assists, 3 rebounds and two steals. As a result of his efforts, Burke won his third player of the week award of the season and fourth of his career on February 18. Morgan returned to the starting lineup in the Penn State contest, but he only played 7 minutes.

After playing only 22 total minutes since January 27, Morgan played more minutes (17) than the other low post players (McGary, Horford, and Max Bielfeldt) for the first time on February 24 against Illinois. Michigan defeated Illinois 71–58 behind 26 points and 8 assists from Burke. In the game, Burke became the seventh Wolverine sophomore to reach 1000 career points. On February 27, Michigan surrendered a 15-point second-half lead to give Penn State its only conference win of the season. Following the game, the team called a rare players-only meeting at the Pizza House, with fifth-year reserve Corey Person doing most of the talking.

==== March ====
On March 3, Michigan defeated Michigan State (#9 AP/#10 Coaches) in the Ann Arbor rematch of their rivalry series as Trey Burke made 2 steals in the final 30 seconds to secure the 58–57 victory. Michigan snapped a 453-game streak with at least one made three-point shot and became the first team since February 2009 to defeat a top ten opponent without making one. On March 6, with its Big Ten Conference Championship destiny in its own hands, Michigan defeated Purdue to set up a championship showdown with Indiana on March 10. Michigan concluded its road schedule with a 5–5 record.

Michigan closed out the season by losing to Indiana (#2 AP/#2 Coaches) on March 10, failing its pursuit of defense of its conference co-championship. Michigan led by 5 with 52 seconds to go, but then missed 3 free throws, including the first attempt during 2 one-and-one situations. Burke and Morgan also missed last-second shots at the rim. Michigan wound down its regular season with its fifteenth sellout and five seniors on the roster: Eso Akunne, Josh Bartelstein, Blake McLimans, Corey Person, and Matt Vogrich. The loss kept Michigan from its first undefeated home season since the 1976–77 team.

=== Postseason ===
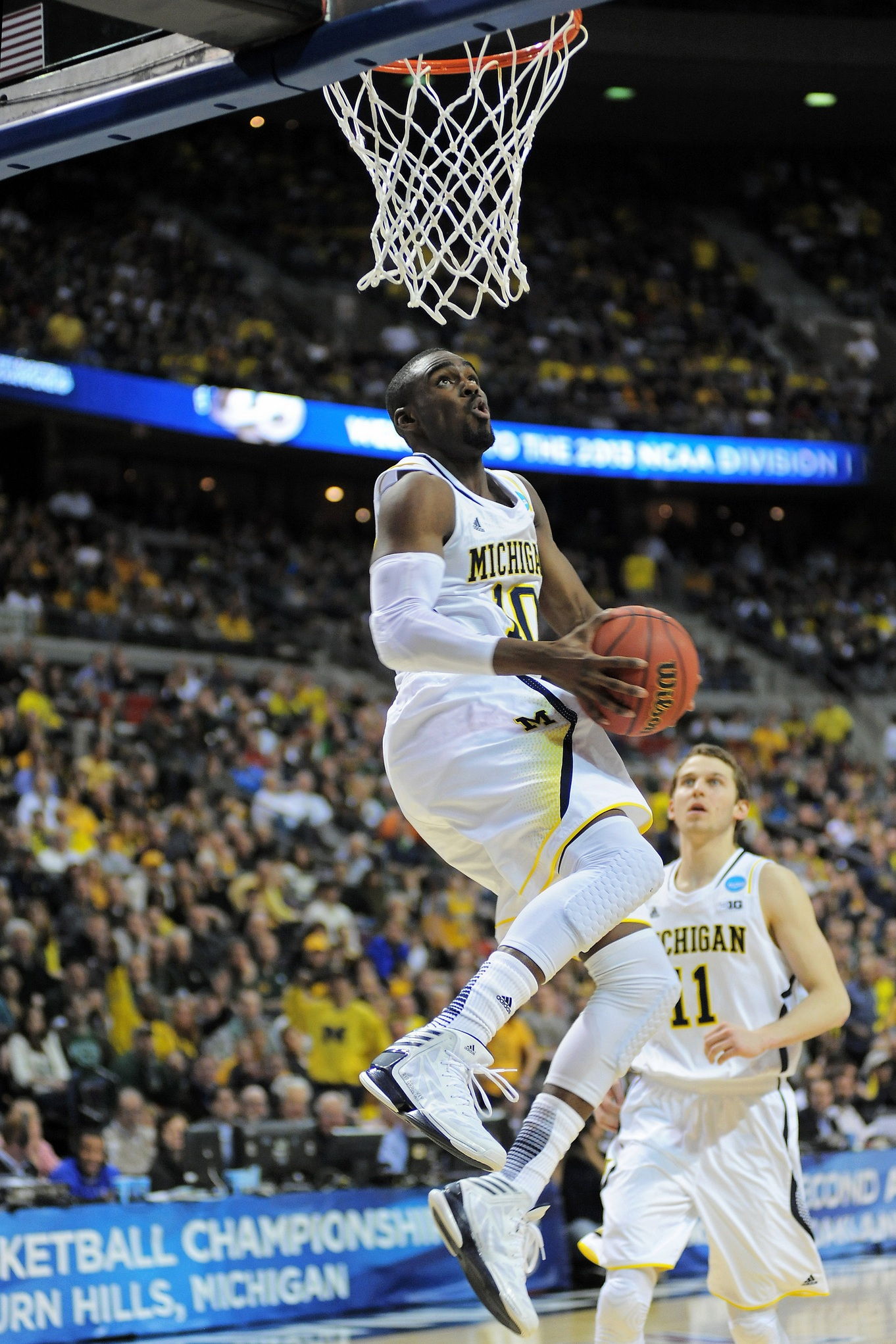
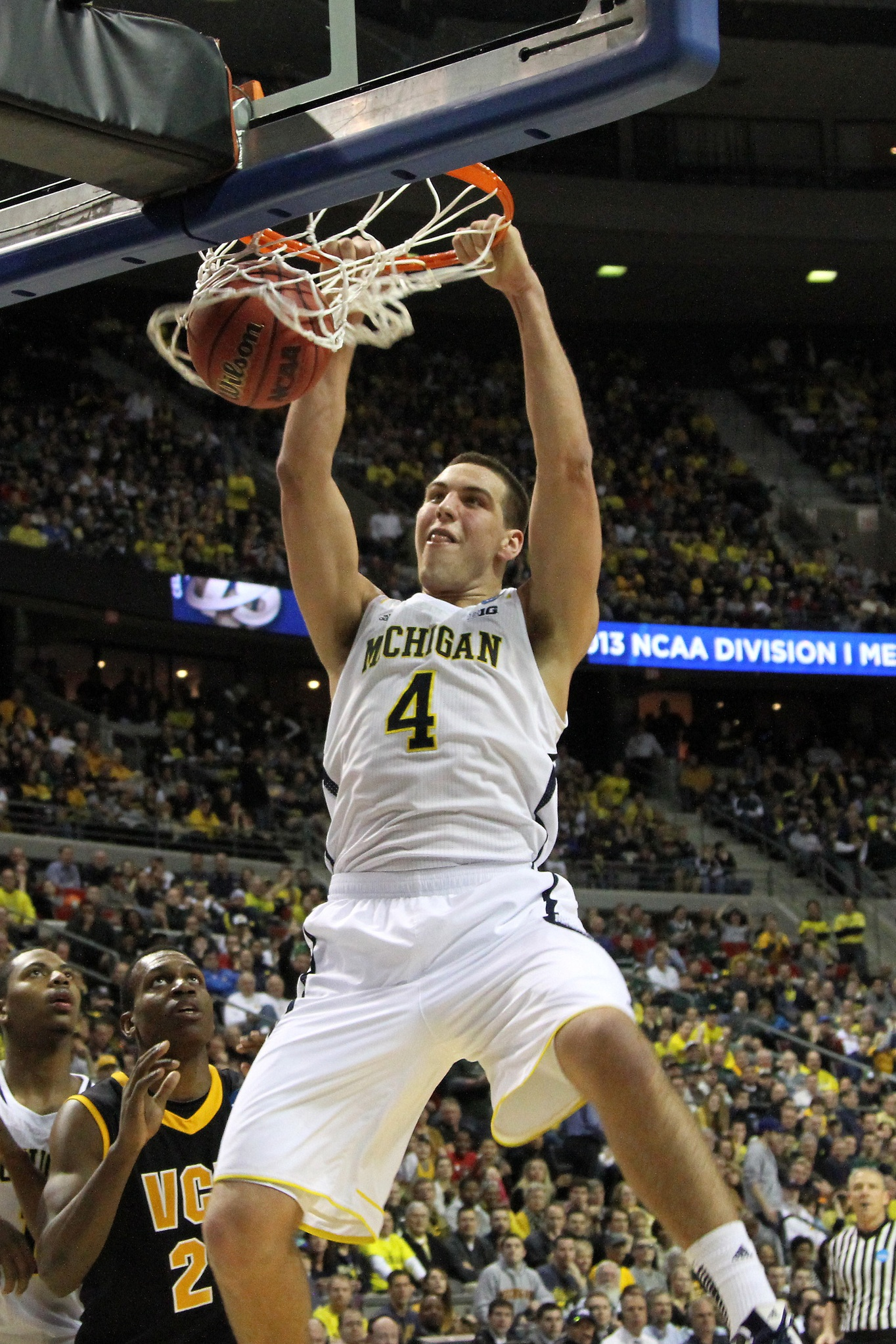
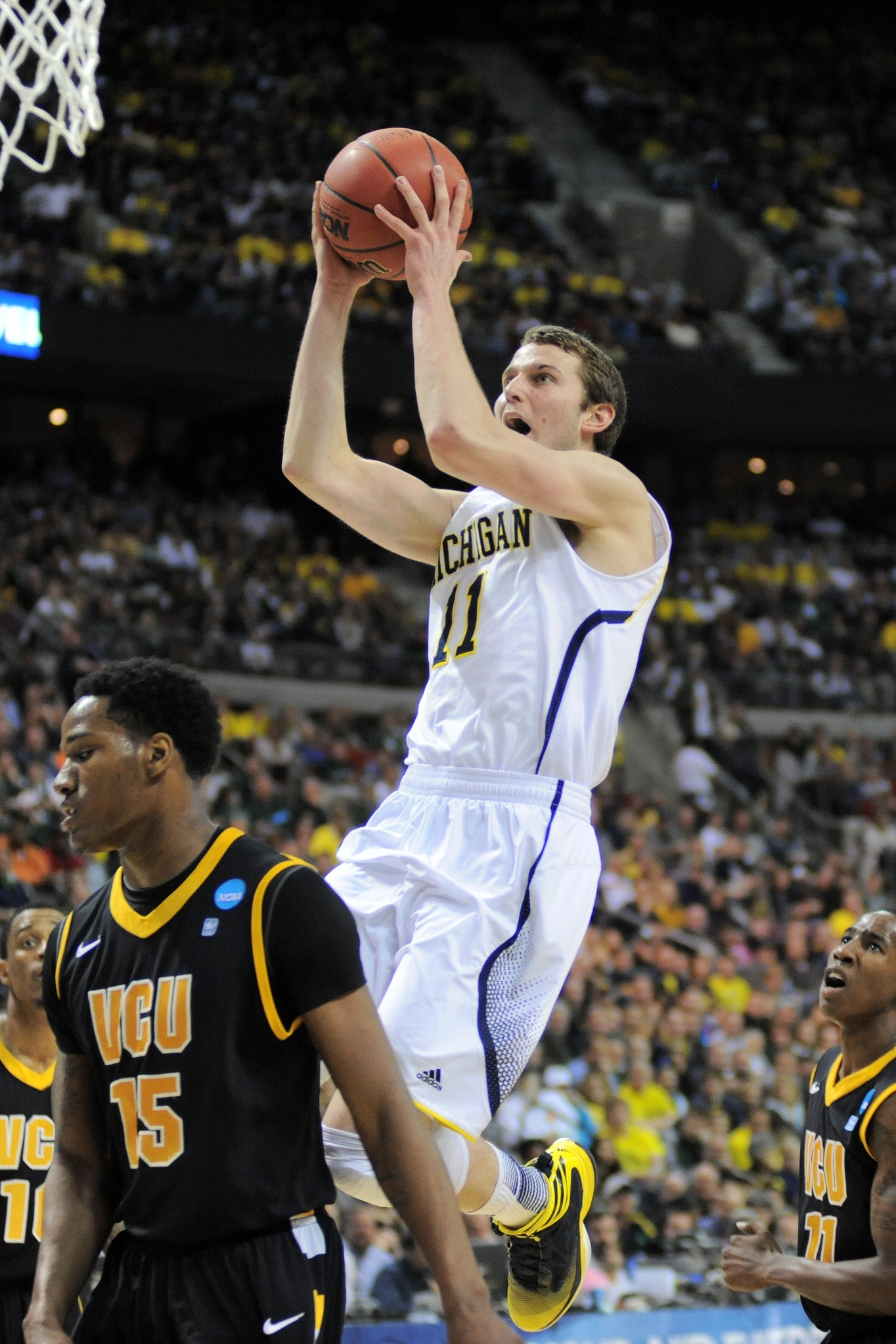
(left to right) Tim Hardaway Jr., Mitch McGary and Nik Stauskas during the 2013 NCAA tournament

Michigan participated in the 2013 Big Ten Conference men's basketball tournament at the United Center in Chicago. As the #5 seed, they defeated Penn State in the opening round on March 14 by an 83–66 margin. In the second round, the team lost to Wisconsin, 68–59. Prior to the 2013 NCAA Division I men's basketball tournament, Jeff Goodman of CBSSports.com named Michigan first among tournament teams in terms of having the most future NBA talent on its roster (in the absence of Kentucky, which was left to accept an invitation to the 2013 National Invitation Tournament). Among Michigan's starting lineup, Burke, Robinson, Hardaway, and McGary were all expected to be likely NBA draft choices, while Stauskas had the potential to be one.

Despite its highly touted lineup, Michigan entered the tournament as the sixth youngest team in the country and the youngest team in the field of 68 teams according to Sports Illustrated, based on weighted minutes played. The game marked Michigan's first NCAA Championship Monday appearance since 1989. Some sources claim 1993 as the school's last appearance, but those results have been vacated by the NCAA due to the University of Michigan basketball scandal.

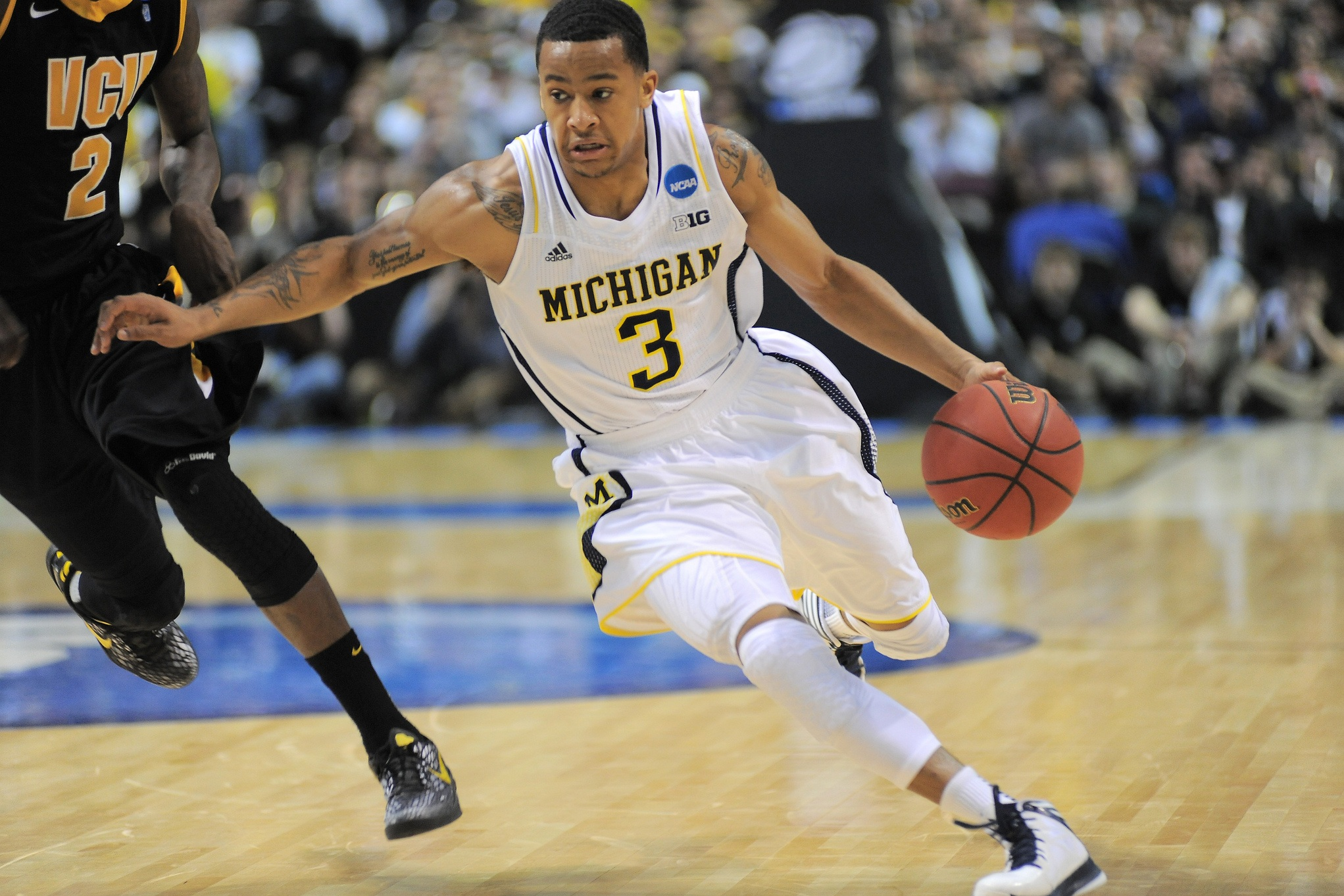
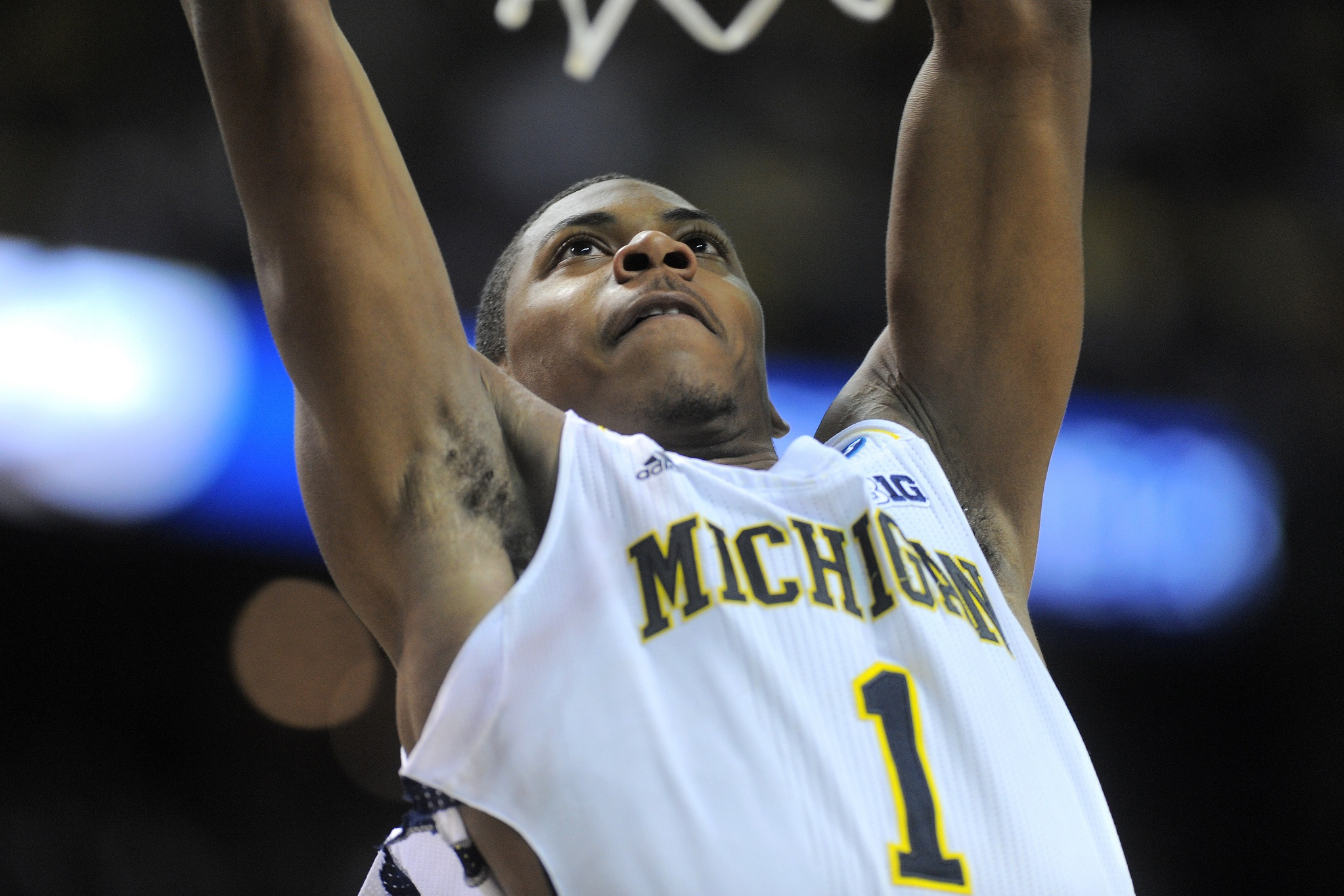
Trey Burke (top) and Glenn Robinson III (bottom) during the 2013 NCAA tournament

Michigan was entered in the tournament's South region where it would play its first two games at The Palace of Auburn Hills in nearby Auburn Hills, Michigan. As a number four seed, Michigan opened the tournament by defeating South Dakota State 71–56, giving the team its most wins in 20 years and matching Beilein's career high as it raised its record to 27–7. Michigan then ousted 5th-seeded VCU by a 78–53 margin. That gave Michigan its first Sweet Sixteen appearance since the 1993–94 team went to the 1994 NCAA Division I men's basketball tournament.

==== Sweet Sixteen ====
"It was probably the biggest shot I ever made and definitely a shot I'll always remember."

— Burke during regional semifinal postgame press conference following his late game-tying three-point shot

The regional championship rounds for Michigan were at AT&T Stadium in Arlington, Texas. On March 29 against Kansas, Michigan overcame a 14-point deficit with 6:50 remaining and a 10-point deficit with 2:52 remaining to force overtime before an eventual victory. Burke scored eight points in the final 1:15 of regulation time, including a game-tying long three-pointer with 4.2 seconds remaining. McGary (25 points and 14 rebounds) and Burke (23 points and 10 assists) both posted double-doubles.

In the regional finals on March 31 against Florida, Michigan built a 13–0 lead and never led by less than 10 the rest of the game. Several players had career-highs in the game: Stauskas with 6 three-point shots, Burke 8 rebounds, McGary 5 steals and off the bench Albrecht 7 points and 3 steals. Eight of McGary's 11 points came as Michigan built the initial 13–0 lead and 5 of Stauskas' 6 three-pointers came as Michigan built a 41–17 lead and closed the half with a 47–30 lead. Burke was named South Regional Tournament Most Outstanding Player. McGary and Stauskas joined Burke on the five-man South All-Regional team. Following the regional championship postgame prayer and with Mrs. Beilein's consent, McGary and Hardaway gave Beilein a Gatorade shower.

==== Final Four ====
The national championship rounds were held at the Georgia Dome in Atlanta, Georgia. In the April 6 national semifinal against Syracuse, Michigan emerged with its thirty-first victory, the most since the 1992–93 team went 31–5. McGary posted 10 points, 12 rebounds and 6 assists, while the bench contributed 22 points, including 6 from Albrecht, who raised his NCAA tournament total to 5-for-5 on three-point shots.

Michigan lost the April 8 national championship game against Midwest number one seed Louisville by an 82–76 score. Albrecht scored 17 first-half points on 4-for-4 three-point shooting. Burke scored 24 points in the championship game and made the seven-man All-Tournament team (which was revised multiple times) along with teammates McGary and Albrecht. The turning point of the game was described as a missed call by the referees when, as Michigan trailed 67–64 with 5 minutes left, Burke pinned Peyton Siva's dunk attempt with a clean, all-ball block, but was called for a foul, resulting in two made free throws by Siva. Michigan never got closer than 4 points the rest of the game. Louisville's championship has since been vacated by the NCAA, as well as all its wins from 2011 to 2015. This followed an escort recruitment scandal at the university.

=== Results ===
Date time, TV	Rank^{#}	Opponent^{#}	Result	Record	High points	High rebounds	High assists	Site (attendance) city, state
Exhibition
November 1, 2012*; 7:00 pm, BTN.com	No. 5	Northern Michigan	W 83–47	–	17 – Stauskas	12 – Morgan	6 – Albrecht	Crisler Center (10,524); Ann Arbor, MI
November 5, 2012*; 7:00 pm, BTN.com	No. 5	Saginaw Valley State	W 76–48	–	17 – Robinson	10 – McGary	8 – Burke	Crisler Center (9,097); Ann Arbor, MI
Non-conference Regular Season
November 9, 2012*; 8:30 pm, BTN.com	No. 5	Slippery Rock	W 100–62	1–0	25 – Hardaway (1)	10 – Hardaway (1)	8 – Burke (1)	Crisler Center (12,693); Ann Arbor, MI
November 12, 2012*; 9:00 pm, ESPNU	No. 5	IUPUI; NIT Season Tip-Off	W 91–54	2–0	22 – Burke (1)	7 – Hardaway (2)	9 – Burke (2)	Crisler Center (8,412); Ann Arbor, MI
November 13, 2012*; 8:00 pm, ESPN2	No. 5	Cleveland State; NIT Season Tip-Off	W 77–47	3–0	17 – Hardaway (2)	9 – McGary (1)	7 – Burke (3)	Crisler Center (8,622); Ann Arbor, MI
November 21, 2012*; 9:30 pm, ESPN2	No. 4	vs. Pittsburgh; NIT Season Tip-Off Semifinal	W 67–62	4–0	17 – Burke (2)	8 – Morgan (1)	6 – Burke (4)	Madison Square Garden (7,230); New York, NY
November 23, 2012*; 4:30 pm, ESPN	No. 4	vs. Kansas State; NIT Season Tip-Off Championship	W 71–57	5–0	23 – Hardaway (3)	12 – Robinson (1)	4 – Burke (5)	Madison Square Garden (7,198); New York, NY
November 27, 2012*; 7:30 pm, ESPN	No. 3	No. 18 NC State; ACC-Big Ten Challenge	W 79–72	6–0	20 – Stauskas (1)	7 – Robinson (2)	11 – Burke (6)	Crisler Center (12,693); Ann Arbor, MI
December 1, 2012*; 4:00 pm, ESPNU	No. 3	at Bradley	W 74–66	7–0	22 – Stauskas (2)	10 – Morgan (2)	5 – Burke (7)	Carver Arena (11,019); Peoria, IL
December 4, 2012*; 8:30 pm, BTN	No. 3	Western Michigan	W 73–41	8–0	20 – Burke (3)	8 – Morgan (3)	7 – Burke (8)	Crisler Center (12,693); Ann Arbor, MI
December 8, 2012*; 12:00 pm, CBS	No. 3	Arkansas	W 80–67	9–0	17 – Robinson (1)	10 – Morgan (4)	7 – Burke (9)	Crisler Center (12,693); Ann Arbor, MI
December 11, 2012*; 7:00 pm, BTN	No. 3	Binghamton	W 67–39	10–0	19 – Burke (4)	10 – McGary (2)	5 – Burke (10)	Crisler Center (11,061); Ann Arbor, MI
December 15, 2012*; 8:00 pm, ESPN	No. 3	vs. West Virginia; Brooklyn Hoops Winter Festival	W 81–66	11–0	27 – Burke (5)	7 – Robinson (3)	8 – Burke (11)	Barclays Center (16,514); Brooklyn, NY
December 20, 2012*; 8:30 pm, BTN	No. 2	Eastern Michigan	W 93–54	12–0	17 – Hardaway (4)	11 – McGary (3)	8 – Burke (12)	Crisler Center (12,693); Ann Arbor, MI
December 29, 2012*; 7:00 pm, BTN	No. 2	Central Michigan	W 88–73	13–0	22 – Burke (6)	7 – Stauskas (1)	11 – Burke (13)	Crisler Center (12,693); Ann Arbor, MI
Big Ten Regular Season
January 3, 2013; 7:00 pm, ESPN2	No. 2	at Northwestern	W 94–66	14–0 (1–0)	23 – Burke (7)	13 – Morgan (5)	5 – Burke (14)	Welsh-Ryan Arena (8,117); Evanston, IL
January 6, 2013; 12:00 pm, BTN	No. 2	Iowa	W 95–67	15–0 (2–0)	20 – Robinson (2)	11 – McGary (4)	12 – Burke (15)	Crisler Center (12,693); Ann Arbor, MI
January 9, 2013; 7:00 pm, BTN	No. 2	Nebraska	W 62–47	16–0 (3–0)	18 – Burke (8)	11 – Morgan (6), Hardaway (3)	3 – Burke (16)	Crisler Center (12,693); Ann Arbor, MI
January 13, 2013; 1:30 pm, CBS	No. 2	at No. 15 Ohio State; Rivalry	L 53–56	16–1 (3–1)	15 – Burke (9)	6 – Morgan (7)	4 – Burke (17)	Value City Arena (18,809); Columbus, OH
January 17, 2013; 7:00 pm, ESPN	No. 5	at No. 9 Minnesota	W 83–75	17–1 (4–1)	21 – Hardaway (5)	5 – Hardaway (4), Robinson (3)	9 – Burke (18)	Williams Arena (14,625); Minneapolis, MN
January 24, 2013; 7:00 pm, ESPN	No. 2	Purdue	W 68–53	18–1 (5–1)	15 – Burke (10)	9 – Robinson (4)	8 – Burke (19)	Crisler Center (12,693); Ann Arbor, MI
January 27, 2013; 6:00 pm, BTN	No. 2	at Illinois	W 74–60	19–1 (6–1)	19 – Burke (11)	8 – McGary (5)	5 – Burke (20)	Assembly Hall (16,618); Champaign, IL
January 30, 2013; 6:30 pm, BTN	No. 1	Northwestern	W 68–46	20–1 (7–1)	18 – Burke (12)	11 – McGary (6)	8 – Burke (21)	Crisler Center (12,693); Ann Arbor, MI
February 2, 2013; 9:00 pm, ESPN	No. 1	at No. 3 Indiana; ESPN College GameDay	L 73–81	20–2 (7–2)	25 – Burke (13)	7 – McGary (7)	8 – Burke (22)	Assembly Hall (17,472); Bloomington, IN
February 5, 2013; 9:00 pm, ESPN	No. 3	No. 10 Ohio State; Rivalry	W 76–74 ^{OT}	21–2 (8–2)	23 – Hardaway (6)	6 – McGary (8), Stauskas (2)	8 – Burke (23)	Crisler Center (12,693); Ann Arbor, MI
February 9, 2013; 12:00 pm, ESPN	No. 3	at Wisconsin	L 62–65 ^{OT}	21–3 (8–3)	19 – Burke (14)	8 – McGary (9)	4 – Burke (24)	Kohl Center (17,249); Madison, WI
February 12, 2013; 9:00 pm, ESPN	No. 4	at No. 8 Michigan State; Rivalry	L 52–75	21–4 (8–4)	18 – Burke (15)	4 – McGary (10)/ Hardaway (5)	4 – Burke (25)	Breslin Center (14,797); East Lansing, MI
February 17, 2013; 12:00 pm, BTN	No. 4	Penn State	W 79–71	22–4 (9–4)	29 – Burke (16)	10 – Robinson (5)	5 – Burke (26)	Crisler Center (12,693); Ann Arbor, MI
February 24, 2013; 1:00 pm, ESPN	No. 7	Illinois	W 71–58	23–4 (10–4)	26 – Burke (17)	7 – Hardaway (6)	8 – Burke (27)	Crisler Center (12,693); Ann Arbor, MI
February 27, 2013; 6:30 pm, BTN	No. 4	at Penn State	L 78–84	23–5 (10–5)	19 – Hardaway (7)	8 – Stauskas (3)	6 – Burke (28)	Bryce Jordan Center (8,892); University Park, PA
March 3, 2013; 4:00 pm, CBS	No. 4	No. 9 Michigan State; Rivalry	W 58–57	24–5 (11–5)	21 – Burke (18)	7 – Hardaway (7)/Morgan (8)	8 – Burke (29)	Crisler Center (12,693); Ann Arbor, MI
March 6, 2013; 7:00 pm, BTN	No. 7	at Purdue	W 80–75	25–5 (12–5)	26 – Burke (19)	7 – Robinson (6)	7 – Burke (30)	Mackey Arena (14,201); West Lafayette, IN
March 10, 2013; 4:00 pm, CBS	No. 7	No. 2 Indiana	L 71–72	25–6 (12–6)	20 – Burke (20)	8 – Morgan (9)	4 – Burke (31)	Crisler Center (12,693); Ann Arbor, MI
Big Ten tournament
March 14, 2013; 2:30 pm, BTN	(5) No. 6	vs. (12) Penn State; First round	W 83–66	26–6	21 – Burke (21)	11 – McGary (11)	5 – Hardaway (1)	United Center (19,470); Chicago, IL
March 15, 2013; 2:35 pm, ESPN	(5) No. 6	vs. (4) No. 22 Wisconsin; Quarterfinal	L 59–68	26–7	19 – Burke (22)	9 – Hardaway (8)	7 – Burke (32)	United Center (21,793); Chicago, IL
NCAA tournament
March 21, 2013*; 7:15 pm, CBS	(S 4) No. 10	vs. (S 13) South Dakota State; First round	W 71–56	27–7	21 – Hardaway (8), Robinson (3)	9 – McGary (12)	7 – Burke (33)	The Palace of Auburn Hills (19,829); Auburn Hills, MI
March 23, 2013*; 12:15 pm, CBS	(S 4) No. 10	vs. (S 5) VCU; Second round	W 78–53	28–7	21 – McGary (1)	14 – McGary (13)	7 – Burke (34)	The Palace of Auburn Hills (21,723); Auburn Hills, MI
March 29, 2013*; 7:37 pm, TBS	(S 4) No. 10	vs. (S 1) No. 3 Kansas; Sweet Sixteen	W 87–85 ^{OT}	29–7	25 – McGary (2)	14 – McGary (14)	10 – Burke (35)	Cowboys Stadium (40,639); Arlington, TX
March 31, 2013*; 2:20 pm, CBS	(S 4) No. 10	vs. (S 3) No. 14 Florida; Elite Eight	W 79–59	30–7	22 – Stauskas (3)	9 – McGary (15)	7 – Burke (36)	Cowboys Stadium (36,585); Arlington, TX
April 6, 2013*; 9:21 pm, CBS	(S 4) No. 10	vs. (E 4) No. 16 Syracuse; Final Four	W 61–56	31–7	13 – Hardaway (9)	12 – McGary (16)	6 – McGary (1)	Georgia Dome (75,350); Atlanta, GA
April 8, 2013*; 9:23 pm, CBS	(S 4) No. 10	vs. (MW 1) No. 2 Louisville; National Championship	L 76–82	31–8	24 – Burke (23)	6 – McGary (17)	4 – Hardaway (2)	Georgia Dome (74,326); Atlanta, GA
*Non-conference game. ^{#}Rankings from AP Poll. (#) Tournament seedings in parentheses. All times are in Eastern Time. Regions: S=South, E=East, MW=Midwest.

== Statistics ==
Statistics come from the team's website:

Name	GP	GS	Min.	Avg.	FG	FGA	FG%	3FG	3FGA	3FG%	FT	FTA	FT%	OR	DR	RB	Avg.	Ast.	Avg.	PF	DQ	TO	Stl.	Blk.	Pts.	Avg.
Trey Burke	39	39	1,378	35.3	259	560	0.463	76	198	0.384	133	166	0.801	21	103	124	3.2	260	6.7	73	0	86	62	20	727	18.6
Tim Hardaway Jr.	38	38	1,324	34.8	201	460	0.437	73	195	0.374	77	111	0.694	9	168	177	4.7	93	2.5	73	0	71	26	17	552	14.5
Nik Stauskas	39	33	1,190	30.5	138	298	0.463	80	182	0.440	74	87	0.851	20	96	116	3.0	52	1.3	26	0	44	22	9	430	11.0
Glenn Robinson III	39	39	1,312	33.6	167	292	0.572	23	71	0.324	71	105	0.676	83	128	211	5.4	43	1.1	44	0	32	39	10	428	11.0
Mitch McGary	39	8	769	19.7	134	224	0.598	0	0	—	23	52	0.442	99	147	246	6.3	25	0.6	92	0	47	42	28	291	7.5
Jordan Morgan	36	27	573	15.9	71	123	0.577	0	0	—	24	43	0.558	62	92	154	4.3	13	0.4	50	1	33	15	3	166	4.6
Jon Horford	32	4	281	8.8	34	59	0.576	0	0	—	19	27	0.704	24	47	71	2.2	9	0.3	46	0	14	8	16	87	2.7
Spike Albrecht	39	0	317	8.1	28	59	0.475	18	33	0.545	10	12	0.833	4	27	31	0.8	28	0.7	24	0	15	12	1	84	2.1
Caris LeVert	33	1	356	10.8	28	89	0.315	13	43	0.302	7	14	0.500	6	30	36	1.1	25	0.8	39	0	10	6	2	76	2.3
Matt Vogrich	26	6	145	5.6	9	27	0.333	5	19	0.263	3	4	0.750	3	20	23	0.9	5	0.2	8	0	3	2	0	26	1.0
Max Bielfeldt	20	0	106	5.3	9	20	0.450	0	2	0.000	5	12	0.417	15	16	31	1.6	3	0.2	8	0	3	3	1	23	1.1
Eso Akunne	18	0	51	2.8	8	26	0.308	4	12	0.333	1	2	0.500	2	10	12	0.7	5	0.3	4	0	1	0	0	21	1.2
Blake McLimans	16	0	40	2.5	4	15	0.267	2	11	0.182	1	2	0.500	3	10	13	0.8	1	0.1	4	0	1	1	1	11	0.7
Corey Person	13	0	23	1.8	3	7	0.429	2	3	0.667	2	3	0.667	0	1	1	0.1	2	0.2	4	0	1	0	0	10	0.8
Josh Bartelstein	6	0	10	1.7	0	1	0.000	0	0	—	0	2	0.000	0	0	0	0.0	1	0.2	1	0	0	1	0	0	0.0
TEAM	38													65	55	120	3.2					7				
Season Total	39	—	—	—	1,093	2,260	0.484	296	769	0.385	450	642	0.701	416	950	1,366	35.0	565	14.5	496	1	368	239	108	2,932	75.2
Opponents	39	—	—	—	941	2,221	0.424	242	745	0.325	343	503	0.682	396	855	1,251	32.1	494	12.7	605	—	470	209	124	2,467	63.3

Burke's 260 assists set a school single-season record. He also finished his sophomore season with 1,231 career points, surpassing the former school record for sophomore season career point total of 1,218 by Chris Webber. Stauskas reached a total of 80 made three-point shots, which surpassed Hardaway's 2-year-old school freshman season record of 76.

== Rankings ==
Ranking movements Legend: ██ Increase in ranking ██ Decrease in ranking т = Tied with team above or below ( ) = First-place votes
	Week																				
Poll	Pre	1	2	3	4	5	6	7	8	9	10	11	12	13	14	15	16	17	18	19	Final
AP	5	5	4	3	3	3	2 (3)	2 (2)	2 (2)	2 (3)	5 (1)	2 (11)	1 (51)	3	4	7	4	7	6	10T	Not released
Coaches'	5	5	4	3	3	3	2 (1)	2 (1)	2 (1)	2 (1)	5	3 (1)	2 (14)	3	5 (1)	7	4	8	8	11	2

== Watchlists and awards ==
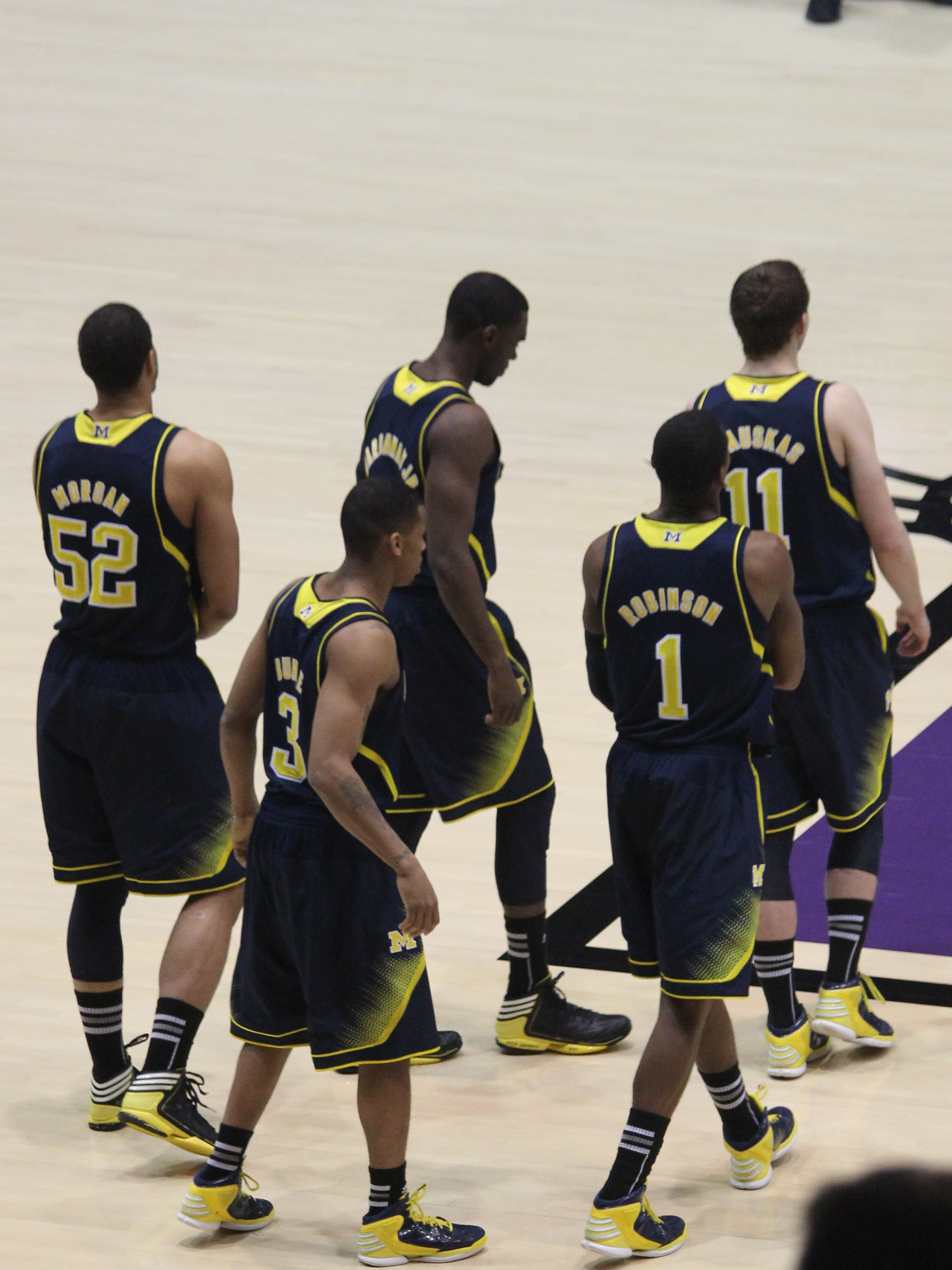
The starting five (Burke, Hardaway Jr., Morgan, Robinson III, Stauskas) in the January 3 2012–13 Big Ten Conference season opener against Northwestern at Welsh-Ryan Arena

=== Preseason ===
	Wooden Top 50	Naismith Top 50
Trey Burke UM	✓	✓
Tim Hardaway Jr. UM	✓	

=== In-season ===
	Big Ten Player of the Week			Big Ten Freshman of the Week	
Date	Name	Class	Position	Name	Position
November 12, 2012	Tim Hardaway Jr.	Jr.	SG		
November 26, 2012				Nik Stauskas	SG
December 3, 2012				Nik Stauskas	SG
December 17, 2012	Trey Burke	So.	PG		
December 24, 2012				Mitch McGary	PF
December 31, 2012				Nik Stauskas	SG
January 7, 2013	Trey Burke	So.	PG	Glenn Robinson III	SF
January 21, 2013	Tim Hardaway Jr.	Jr.	SG		
January 28, 2013				Glenn Robinson III	SF
February 11, 2013				Mitch McGary	PF
February 18, 2013	Trey Burke	So.	PG		

Stauskas also earned recognition from Sports Illustrated's Seth Davis as National Freshman of the Week on December 3. On January 9, Burke earned the Oscar Robertson National Player of the Week from the United States Basketball Writers Association (USBWA). Burke also earned ESPN.com Player of the Week recognition on April 1.

The Wooden Award midseason top 25 list, which included Burke, was announced on January 10. On January 31, Burke was named to the Oscar Robertson Trophy (USBWA National Player of the Year) midseason top 12 list, while Stuaskas and Robinson were named to the Wayman Tisdale Award (USBWA National Freshman of the Year) top 12 midseason list. Burke was one of six Big Ten players named among the top 30 finalists for the Naismith Award when the list was announced on February 26. Burke was among four Big Ten Players on the March 4, 14-man Robertson watchlist. On March 9, Burke was named among the top 15 Wooden Award finalists. On March 11, Burke was named one of five finalists for the Cousy Award. Burke was named one of four finalists for the Naismith Award on March 24.

Burke was named a first-team All-American by Sporting News on March 11, the USBWA on March 18, Sports Illustrated on March 19, CBSSports.com on March 20, the National Association of Basketball Coaches (NABC) on March 28, and the Associated Press on April 1. Burke was one of four Big Ten players named to the 10-man Wooden All-American team of finalists for the Wooden Award on April 1. On April 1, Robinson was one of two Big Ten players (Harris) named to the 21-man 2013 Kyle Macy Freshman All-America team. Burke became the fifth Consensus All-American (Cazzie Russell, Rickey Green, Gary Grant and Webber) in school history.

SI also named Burke National Player of the Year, making him the second (Russell, 1966) National Player of the Year in school history. On April 4, Burke won the Bob Cousy Award and was named Associated Press College Basketball Player of the Year. Burke won both the Oscar Robertson Trophy from the USBWA as well as the John R. Wooden Award on April 5. On April 7, he won the NABC Player of the Year and Naismith College Player of the Year awards, giving him a sweep of the four major player of the year awards.

Burke earned Big Ten Conference Men's Basketball Player of the Year in 2013 and was a unanimous 2012–13 All-Big Ten 1st team selection. Hardaway was a 1st team selection by the coaches and second team by the media. Robinson was an honorable mention All-Conference selection and All-freshman honoree by the coaches. Morgan was a coaches All-defensive team selection. On March 12, the USBWA named Burke and Hardaway to its 2012–13 Men's All-District V (OH, IN, IL, MI, MN, WI) Team, based upon voting from its national membership. Burke was recognized as District V Player of the Year. Burke and Hardaway were selected to the NABC Division I All-District 7 first team on March 26, as selected and voted on by member coaches of the NABC, making them eligible for the State Farm Coaches' Division I All-America team. On that same day, Burke was selected to the 21-man 2013 Lute Olson All-America Team.

John Beilein was selected as an assistant coach for the 2013 World University Games. Seniors Josh Bartelstein and Matt Vogrich were among the 38 Big Ten men's basketball players recognized as Winter Academic All-Big Ten for maintaining 3.0 averages. Trey Burke was named team MVP.

== 2013 NBA draft ==
Prior to the final four, McGary stated that he would not enter the 2013 NBA draft, but a few days later said he had been caught off guard and would prefer to respond after he had time to reflect on his season.

At 12:30 PM ET on April 4, Forbes sports business reporter Darren Heitner tweeted that Burke and teammate Hardaway would declare for the 2013 NBA Draft. According to Heiter, one of Burke's potential sports agents was Alonzo Shavers, who had known Burke since his birth. Burke's mother responded at 2:15 PM that same day that "He has not made any decision" about going pro, according to Yahoo! Sports reporter Eric Adelson. At 2:23 PM, Heitner tweeted that Hardaway Sr. said his son was undecided.

On April 9 before boarding the airplane to return from the NCAA Final Four, Beilein met with Burke, Hardaway, Robinson and McGary to direct them to seek the advice of the NBA advisory committee. The draft board had until April 15 to develop each individual report and the players had until April 28 to enter the draft. On that same date, ESPN's Jason King predicted that if all four players had left for the NBA draft, the 2013–14 team would have begun the season unranked. USA Today projected on April 9 that if one of the four possible 2013 NBA draft entrants returned, Michigan could have been ranked number twenty-four, and that if they all returned, Michigan would have been preseason number one. ESPN journalist Myron Medcalf predicted on April 12 that Burke and Hardaway would enter the draft and that McGary and Robinson were on the borderline of doing so.

On April 13, reports surfaced that Burke would announce that he would enter the NBA draft at a press conference the following day. He entered the 2013 NBA Draft on April 14. On April 17, Hardaway declared for the NBA draft. McGary and Robinson announced on April 18 that they had decided not to enter their names in the NBA draft.

On June 27, 2013, Burke was selected ninth in the 2013 NBA Draft by the Milwaukee Bucks and then traded to the Utah Jazz for the fourteenth and twenty-first picks, which were used to select Shabazz Muhammad and Gorgui Dieng. Hardaway was drafted twenty-fourth by the New York Knicks. Burke and Hardaway became the first Michigan duo selected in the first round since Juwan Howard and Jalen Rose in the 1994 NBA draft. Burke became the first top-10 Wolverine selection since Jamal Crawford in the 2000 NBA draft, and joined Victor Oladipo and Cody Zeller, who were selected second and fourth, respectively, to give the Big Ten its first top ten trio since the 1990 NBA draft. Hardaway joined his father, who was picked fourteenth in 1989 NBA draft, as a first round selection.

=== Team players drafted into the NBA ===
Every player that started in the 2013 national championship game was drafted either in the 2013 or 2014 NBA draft. Four players from Michigan's 2012 entering class were eventually drafted in the NBA draft (Stauskas, McGary, Robinson and LeVert).

Year	Round	Pick	Overall	Player	NBA club
2013	1	9	9	Trey Burke	Minnesota Timberwolves
2013	1	24	24	Tim Hardaway Jr.	New York Knicks
2014	1	8	8	Nik Stauskas	Sacramento Kings
2014	1	21	21	Mitch McGary	Oklahoma City Thunder
2014	2	10	40	Glenn Robinson III	Minnesota Timberwolves
2016	1	20	20	Caris LeVert	Indiana Pacers

== Postseason roster changes ==
Following the season the team lost five seniors from the roster: guard Eso Akunne, guard Josh Bartelstein (captain), forward Blake McLimans, guard Corey Person and guard Matt Vogrich. The team's required 10-year dissociation with players implicated in the University of Michigan basketball scandal ended on May 8, 2013. Bartelstein blogged for the team from October 15, 2010, until April 11, 2013. His blogs from this season were turned into an ebook about the season entitled We On: Behind the Scenes of Michigan's Final Four Run.
