= Josh Bartelstein =

American basketball executive and player

Phoenix Suns
- Title: CEO Phoenix Suns, Phoenix Mercury, Valley Suns, and Footprint Center
- League: NBA/WNBA

Personal information
- Born: July 17, 1989 (age 37)
- Listed height: 6 ft 3 in (1.91 m)
- Listed weight: 210 lb (95 kg)

Career information
- High school: Phillips Exeter (Exeter, New Hampshire); Highland Park (Highland Park, Illinois)
- College: Michigan (2009–2013)
- Position: Guard

Career highlights
- As player: 3× Academic All-Big Ten (2011–2013)

Josh Bartelstein (born July 17, 1989) is an American basketball executive and former college basketball player who is currently the CEO of the Phoenix Suns of the National Basketball Association (NBA), Phoenix Mercury of the Women's National Basketball Association (WNBA), and the Footprint Center.

Prior to his ascension to his current position, he spent 7 and a half years in various roles for the Detroit Pistons of the NBA. He played college basketball for Michigan as a walk-on and was a 3x Academic All-Big Ten honoree. He served as captain of the national runner-up 2012–13 Michigan Wolverines men's basketball team. He was a two-year starter at Highland Park High School before spending a post-graduate season playing for Phillips Exeter Academy where he set a couple of school records.

He is the son of NBA and National Football League (NFL) sports agent Mark Bartelstein of Priority Sports and Entertainment.

== Early life ==
Bartelstein is from Highland Park, Illinois in the North Shore of the Chicago metropolitan area. He is the son of Mark and Sheri Bartelstein and has three sisters. He played basketball with a core group of friends from second grade through organized high school basketball. As a 10-year-old in 2000, Bartelstein played for the Highland Park 11-year-old traveling baseball team as a pitcher and attended a skills academy run by former St. Louis Cardinals minor leaguer John Stutz and professional baseball player Pete Dallas. He also played his first year of organized basketball in the Highwood Small Fry youth basketball 2000 spring season.

Because his father, Mark, was an NBA and NFL sports agent, Bartelstein had the opportunity to fill his bedroom wall with pictures of himself alongside many famous athletes. The first picture he put on his bedroom of a non-relative was one with Bobby Phills. The first basketball game that he ever missed was the night he learned of Phills' death in an automobile accident in 2000. As he grew, he had the opportunity to have workouts with athletes such as Mo Williams, Bobby Simmons and Kirk Hinrich.

In 2002, Bartelstein was one of the leaders of The Highwood Heat of the Highwood Small Fry basketball league. The team went 7–1 to earn a trip to Orlando for the Small Fry International youth basketball tournament.

== High school ==
A summer 2005 area recruiting guide listed Bartelstein as a player to watch. As a 5 ft 9 in (1.75 m) sophomore guard, Bartelstein was expected to start for Highland Park High School until he endured an ankle stress fracture that limited his season to 3 games. He had to have screws put in his ankle. He returned as a 6 ft 1 in (1.85 m) junior reserve. He regularly reviewed game film of every high school game with his father, who helped him make acquaintance with several professional athletes, such as Brad Miller and Antoine Walker of the NBA and Kurt Warner of the NFL.

At Highland Park, he was considered one of the leaders of the team (along with Chris Wroblewski). Bartelstein's steal started a 15–0 run as part of the comeback in the 2007 Illinois High School Association (IHSA) Class AA regional championship for the four-seeded Highland Park Giants against fifth-seeded John Hersey High School.

Bartelstein scored 19 points on 5–6 three point shooting the help Highland Park won its 11th consecutive game during his senior season. As of January of his 2008 senior season, he had NCAA Division III offers from New York University and Emory University as well as promising interest from some NCAA Division I programs such as University of Wisconsin-Milwaukee, Northwestern and Pepperdine. As a senior he made two all-tournament teams (Moline and Elgin). In April 2008, he committed to play for Phillips Exeter Academy. He finished his senior season with a total of 51 three point shots, a 9.8 scoring average and 3.9 rebounds for a Highland Park team that finished as the 2008 IHSA Class 4A regional champions. In the regional championship game for number 3 seeded Highland Park, Bartelstein posted 10 points in the 51–50 victory over number eleven seeded Waukegan High School. The 2008 Highland Park senior class was the first in school history to have back-to-back 20-win seasons. Because of his "bridge year" commitment, he was eligible to play an additional season of the AAU summer basketball circuit, where he posted multiple 30-point games.

In the fall of 2008, Bartelstein nearly signed Division I scholarship offers with Elon University and then University of San Diego, but he was eventually attracted by the appeal of the Big Ten Conference and Michigan's Ross School of Business. Michigan Head coach John Beilein had been a walk-on player himself and the 2008–09 Michigan Wolverines men's basketball team was co-captained by former walk-ons David Merritt and C.J. Lee who played significant roles. While averaging 15.5 points per game, Bartelstein set two school records at Phillips Exeter: single-half scoring (21 points vs. New Hampton) and single-season three-pointers (52). Because he had grown 7 inches late in high school, the extra year gave him a chance to grow into his body and show his potential. The year marked progress in his "long-range shooting and off-the-dribble game", according to Beilein. He was recruited by Penn and had walk-on offers from Michigan and Northwestern and claimed 9 Division I scholarship offers. Bartelstein's Exeter coach, Malcolm Wesselink, confirmed 3 of these D I offers (San Diego, Wagner and Elon). Bartelstein was connected to Michigan by former Beilein assistant Mike Maker. He was in communication with athletes that he had met as a youth such as Chris Quinn and Shannon Brown during his recruitment. On May 22, 2009, Bartelstein was announced by Beilein as one of two (along with Eso Akunne) preferred walk-on (non-scholarship) players to join an incoming 2009–10 class of six new players (Blake McLimans, Jordan Morgan, Darius Morris, and North Shore native Matt Vogrich). Bartelstein and Akunne brought the number of walk-ons on the roster to 4 (with Eric Puls and Corey Person). Morris, Vogrich and Akunne were all guards.

== College ==
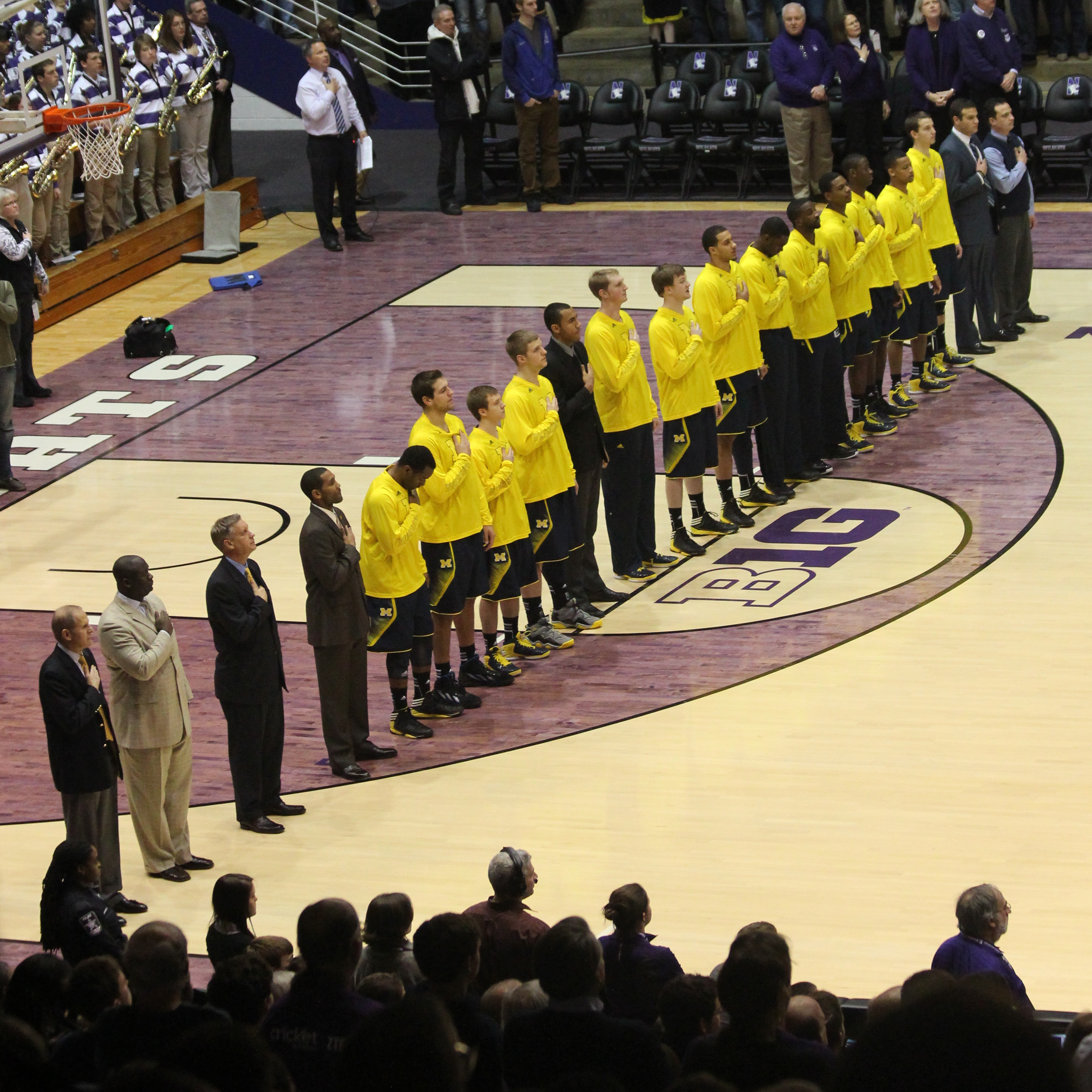
Bartelstein is second from the right in this photo of the 2012–13 Michigan Wolverines

On November 14, 2009, in the 2009–10 Michigan Wolverines season opener and the first game of his college career against Northern Michigan Bartlestein played in what would be his career high 4 minutes. He posted his first points on December 28, 2010, against (#11 ESPN/USA Today, #12 AP) Purdue on a three point shot as a sophomore for the 2010–11 Wolverines. He was one of 41 men's basketball 2010–11 Academic All-Big Ten selections.

The March 4 victory over Penn State clinched a share of the 2011–12 Big Ten Conference season regular season championship for the 2011–12 team. One of Bartelstein's 4 career assists came in an appearance in the February 5, 2012 rivalry game against (#10 ESPN/USA Today, #9 AP) Michigan State in which he was credited with zero minutes played. Bartelstein's' other points came on a three pointer against (#7-ranked) Ohio State on March 10 in the 2012 Big Ten men's basketball tournament. As a junior, Bartelstein was among 37 Academic All-Big Ten men's basketball players.

Prior to the first exhibition game on November 1, 2012, Bartelstein was named team captain of the 2012–13 Michigan Wolverines. Although Bartelstein was the official captain, he only played 10 minutes all season, and the team was led on the court by Trey Burke and Tim Hardaway Jr. Despite his modest role in the games, he is noted for his "leadership, motivational abilities and commitment to success" according to Bleacher Report author Lee Schechter (especially as evidenced by his output in "The Bartelstein Blog"). On March 10, 2013, Michigan lost its regular season finale to Indiana (#2 AP/#2 Coaches), failing to defend its conference co-championship. Michigan celebrated senior day for five seniors: Akunne, Bartelstein, McLimans, Corey Person, and Vogrich. The loss kept Michigan from its first undefeated home season since the 1976–77 team. In the April 6 national semifinal against Syracuse, Michigan earned its thirty-first victory, the most since the 1992–93 team went 31–5. Michigan lost the April 8, national championship game against Midwest number one seed Louisville by an 82–76 score. Louisville's championship has since been vacated by the NCAA. Bartelstein appeared in 2 tournament games (against VCU and Florida). As a senior, Bartelstein was among the 38 Big Ten men's basketball players recognized as Winter Academic All-Big Ten for maintaining 3.0 averages.

Six players from the 2012–13 Wolverines team that Bartelstein captained were future NBA draftees: Trey Burke (2013, 9th), Tim Hardaway Jr. (2013, 24th), Nik Stauskas (2014, 8th), Mitch McGary (2014, 21st), Glenn Robinson III (2014, 40th), and Caris LeVert (2016, 20th). Bartelstein's father became the agent for three of those players: his former roommate, Hardaway, Stauskas, and McGary as well as future Wolverine and NBA player Derrick Walton.

In September 2013, Bartelstein released an ebook that chronicled Michigan's rise from a sub-.500 basketball team to the NCAA Championship game. It included elements from his blog, photos, videos and contributions by his past teammates.

== Professional career ==
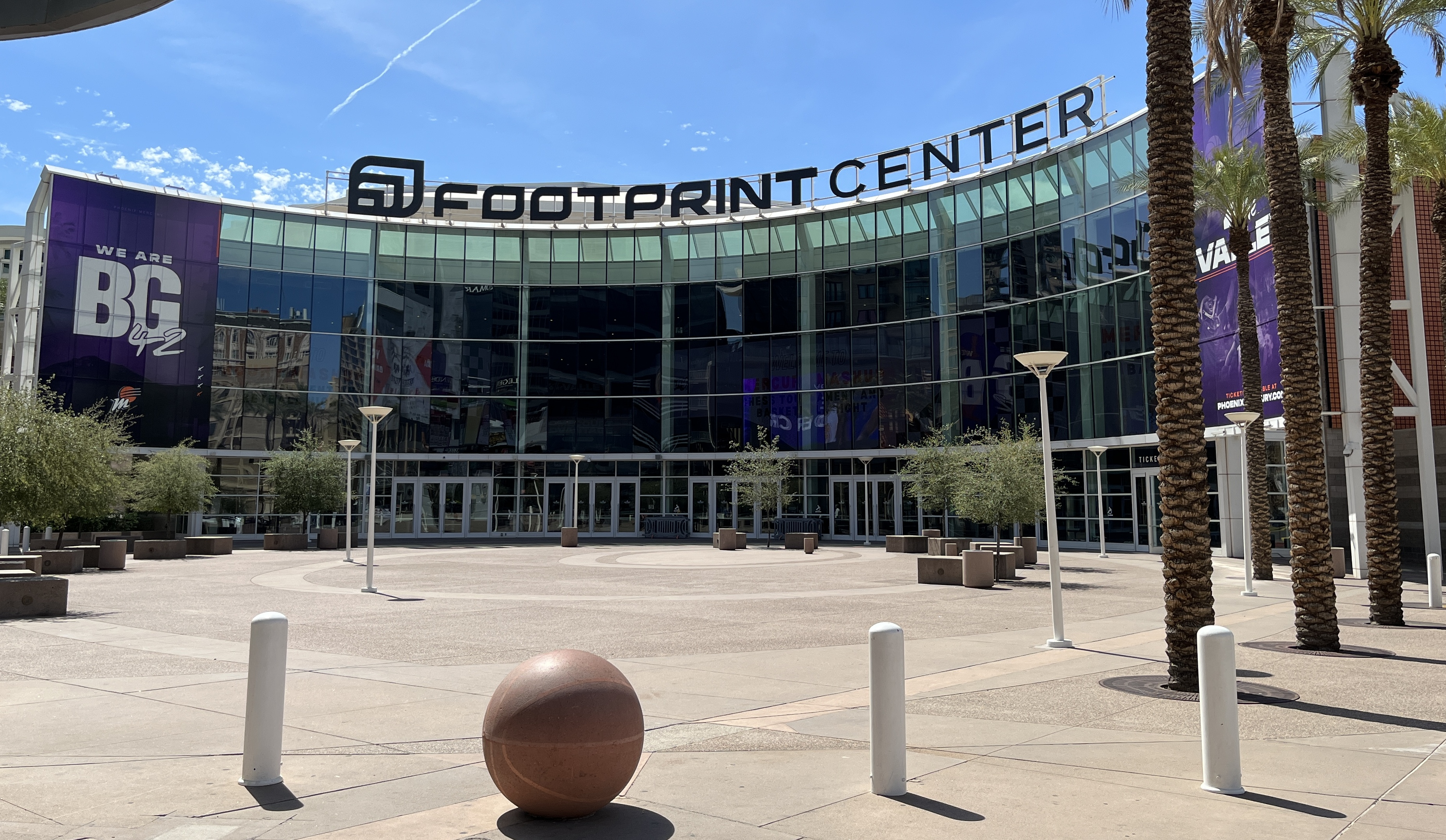
Bartelstein was named CEO of the Footprint Center (pictured in 2022), which is home to the Phoenix Suns and Phoenix Mercury as well as the Arizona Rattlers.

In August 2015, Bartelstein and Wroblewski hosted a two-day basketball skills development camp in the North Shore for youth between 3rd and 12th grade. At the time Bartelstein was a 7th and 8th grade basketball coach in Highland Park. Bartelstein was hired by the Detroit Pistons in October 2015 "as an assistant to Palace Sports & Entertainment vice chair Arn Tellem". In his 8 years with the Pistons, he went on to hold the titles of Chief of Staff and then Executive Vice President of Business and Basketball Operations before becoming Assistant General Manager in June 2022. Then he was hired as CEO of the Phoenix Suns, Phoenix Mercury and the operating entity for Footprint Center on April 10, 2023. Among his notable roles for the Pistons was his oversight of the design and construction of the Henry Ford-Detroit Pistons Performance Center. His role as CEO gives him authority over business operations while the team tasked its basketball operations to its President of Basketball Operations and General Manager.

Mat Ishbia bought a majority share of the Suns from Robert Sarver in February 2023, leading to the resignation of Phoenix Suns president and CEO Jason Rowley and clearing the way for an organizational cultural reset. The story regarding Bartelstein's hiring as part of an overhaul by Ishbia, who like Bartelstein was a walk-on Big Ten basketball player (for Michigan State), broke on March 4, 2023. Bartelstein was not officially named CEO until April 10, 2023. During his first season as Suns CEO, Bartelstein played a pivotal role in orchestrating trades that saw the acquisition of Bradley Beal, Jusuf Nurkić, and Grayson Allen.

On July 6, 2026, Bartelstein and the Suns agreed to a contract extension.
