= Maize (color) =

Color

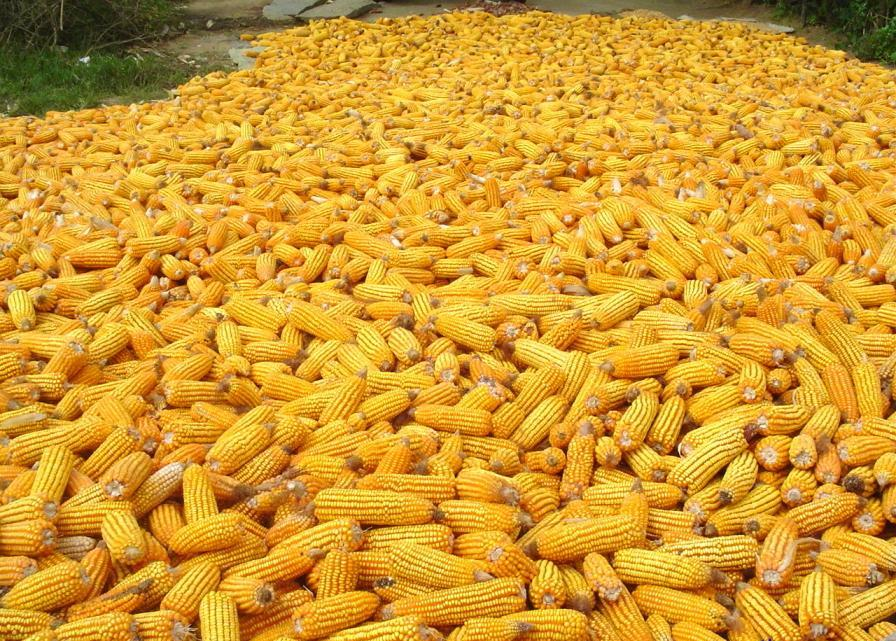
- The color is named for the cereal Maize

Color coordinates
- Hex triplet: #ffcb05
- sRGB^{B} (r, g, b): (255, 203, 5)
- HSV (h, s, v): (48°, 98%, 100%)
- CIELCh_{uv} (L, C, h): (84, 98, 63°)
- Source: Maerz and Paul
- ISCC–NBS descriptor: Brilliant greenish yellow
- B: Normalized to [0–255] (byte)

Corn
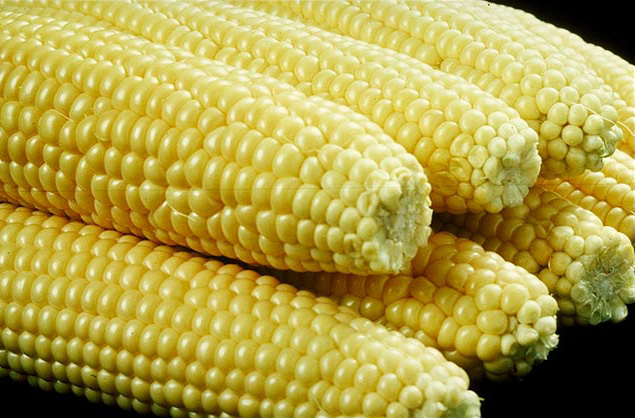
- Sweet corn

Color coordinates
- Hex triplet: #fbec5d
- sRGB^{B} (r, g, b): (251, 236, 93)
- HSV (h, s, v): (54°, 63%, 98%)
- CIELCh_{uv} (L, C, h): (92, 86, 79°)
- Source: ColorHexa
- B: Normalized to [0–255] (byte)

The shade maize or corn refers to a specific tone of yellow; it is named for the cereal of the same name—maize (called corn in the United States and Canada). In public usage, maize can be applied to a variety of shades, ranging from light yellow to a dark shade that borders on orange, since the color of maize (the actual corn) may vary.

The first recorded use of maize as a color name in English was in 1861.

== Usage ==
Biology

- "Light maize in color, this wildflower is found only now and then in our area, and treasured for its rarity. The three clumps, two near the east fence under a thriving red-stemmed dogwood and one beside a weathered stump, gave us a thrill last spring with their first buds."

Chemistry

- "For slow cases, one can use the method... in which a solution of thymol blue has had its pH value adjusted so that it is maize in color and any slight increase in the acidity which makes the solution turn blue."

Sports

- Maize is one of the two colors used by the University of Michigan Wolverines, the other being blue. While the actual shade of yellow used has varied over time, it always approaches the color of corn. In 1867, a group of University of Michigan students declared “azure blue” and “maize” the official colors of the school. Maize was chosen by the students because it contrasted nicely with the blue, which had been an unofficial color of the university since its founding. However, in the following years, a problem arose that there was no standard for the exact hue of yellow used by the school. The original maize had devolved into an “expressionless pale yellow", and “had lost its original character”. In 1912, the Board of Regents established a committee to define and provide examples of the exact school colors. The committee decided that maize would be defined as the color of golden corn. Maize and blue ribbons were selected in the now-official shades. These ribbons are preserved today in the Bentley Historical Library’s archive. The athletic colors of Carleton College are also maize and blue.

== See also ==
- List of colors
