= Max Bielfeldt =

American basketball player (born 1993)

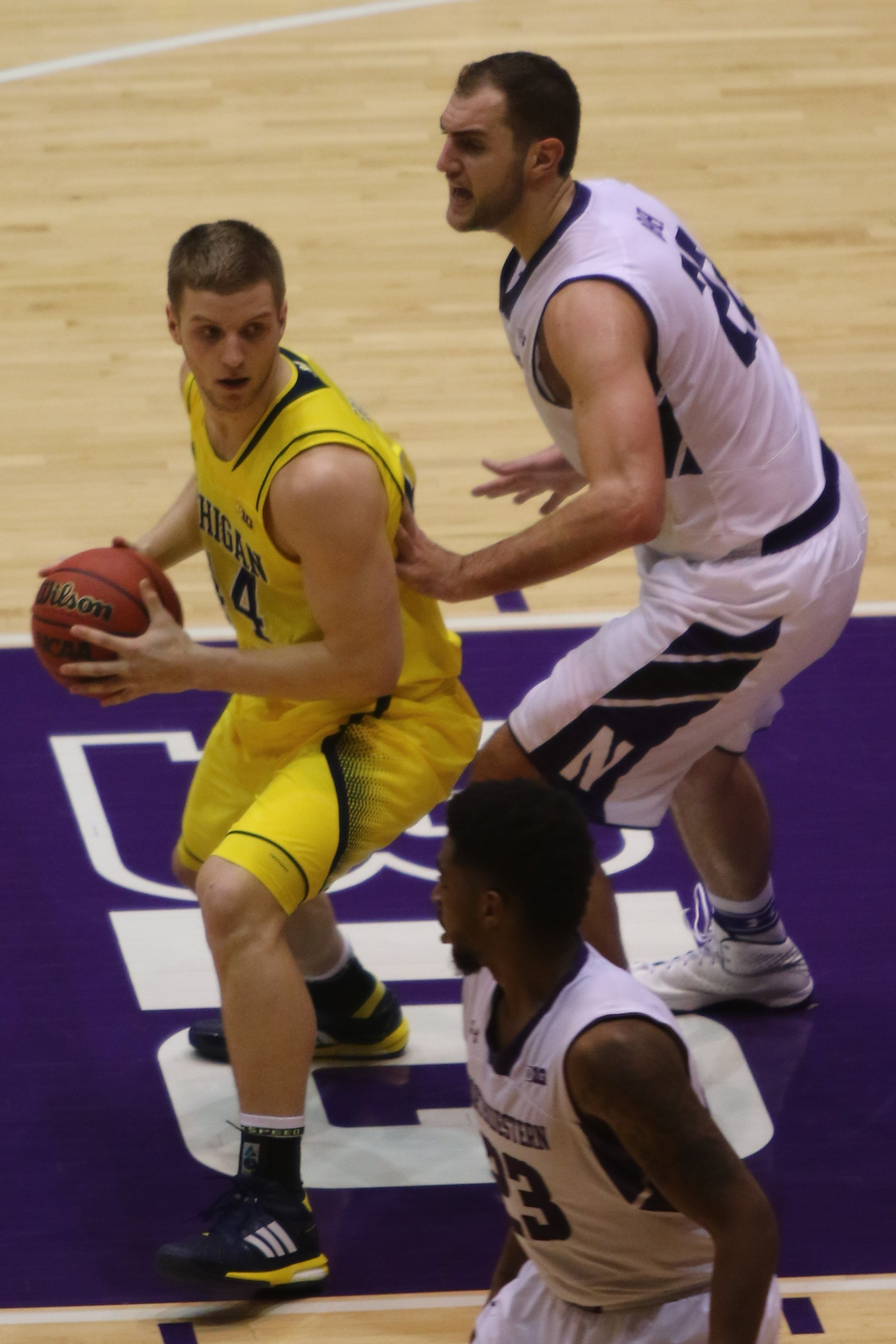
- Bielfeldt (left) as a true senior for the 2014–15 Michigan Wolverines

Personal information
- Born: June 7, 1993 (age 33) Peoria, Illinois, U.S.
- Listed height: 6 ft 8 in (2.03 m)
- Listed weight: 245 (Note: Although the University of Michigan has Bielfeldt listed at 6'8", 245 pounds, Sports Reference lists him at 6'7", 201) lb (111 kg)

Career information
- High school: Peoria Notre Dame (Peoria, Illinois)
- College: Michigan (2011–2015); Indiana (2015–2016)
- NBA draft: 2016: undrafted
- Position: Power forward

Career highlights
- Big Ten Conference Sixth Man of the Year (2016)

Maxwell Claggett Bielfeldt (born June 7, 1993) is an American former college basketball player for the Michigan Wolverines and Indiana Hoosiers of the Big Ten Conference. After redshirting his freshman season for the 2011–12 Michigan Wolverines who were Big Ten regular season co-champions, he played for the national runner-up 2012–13 Michigan Wolverines and Big Ten regular season champion 2013–14 Michigan team. In his final year of eligibility at Indiana, he earned the 2016 Big Ten Conference Sixth Man of the Year for the Big Ten regular season champion 2015–16 Indiana Hoosiers. He was the first men's basketball player to earn Big Ten Championships at two different universities.

Prior to playing in the Big Ten, Bielfeldt played for Peoria Notre Dame High School, where he earned first team All-State recognition from numerous selectors as a class of 2011 senior as well as numerous distinctions in his earlier years. When he was in high school, he was regarded as possibly the greatest low post player to hail from Peoria, Illinois. During his recruitment, he was initially pursued as a scholarship recruit by mid-major basketball programs, and was offered a preferred walk-on slot at Illinois. When Michigan pursued Bielfeldt, Illinois' eventual scholarship offer did not convince him to join the program.

Bielfeldt is the grandson of Gary and Carlotta Bielfeldt (who endowed the University of Illinois Urbana-Champaign's Bielfeldt Athletic Administration Building). Nicknamed Big Puppy in high school and Moose at Michigan, he has three sisters, including older sister Elle who is married to National Basketball Association (NBA) veteran Meyers Leonard.

== Background and early life ==
Born in Peoria, Illinois on June 7, 1993, Bielfeldt is the son of David and Julie Bielfeldt. Bielfeldt's parents and both sets of grandparents are Illinois alumni. Grandfather Gary Bielfeldt played football for Illinois in the 1950s, as well as other sports. He later became a commodities trader. Grandmother Carlotta Bielfeldt was homecoming queen at Illinois. Constructed between the October 21, 1994, groundbreaking and the October 4, 1996, dedication, the University of Illinois Urbana-Champaign's Bielfeldt Athletic Administration Building is a $7.2 million ($14.78 million in 2025), 43,000-square-foot (3995 m^{2}) building that was endowed by Gary and Carlotta. His older sister, Elle, and brother-in-law, Meyers Leonard, are alumni, with Leonard having played basketball at Illinois before his NBA career. His sister Matti played volleyball at Illinois. His youngest sibling, Lydia, is six years his junior.

Bielfeldt began playing basketball when he was four at the downtown Peoria YMCA and at home with his Little Tikes hoop. In fifth grade, he joined the Peoria Academy school team and the following year he joined an AYBT travel team. He attended developmental camps at Bradley University and the University of Illinois.

After attending the 2005 NCAA Division I men's basketball championship game in Saint Louis, where Illinois lost to North Carolina, his dream was to help Illinois win its first national championship.

== High school ==
=== Freshman and sophomore years ===
He entered Peoria Notre Dame High School at 6 ft 2 in (1.88 m) and grew 4 inches (10.2 cm) during his freshman year. Bielfeldt played AAU basketball with the Indiana SPY Players that included future Michigan teammates Mitch McGary and Glenn Robinson III, son of Glenn Robinson. His AAU team was based in Gary, Indiana. Bielfeldt, nicknamed Big Puppy, grew up in a lifestyle where he had his own Mercedes-Benz convertible to drive when he was not driving one of the family's Cadillac Escalades.

During his 2008–09 sophomore season, he earned press along with his older sister for being one of the area's interesting sibling basketball performers. That season, he earned 2009 (All-Area) Large-school boys basketball All-Star team recognition from the Peoria Journal Star after posting 15.0 points per game, 8.7 rebounds per game, a 66.4% field-goal percentage, and a total of 94 blocks.

=== Junior year ===
During his 2009–10 junior season, he had become the region's "most dominant post player", averaging 20.2 points and 12.0 rebounds with a total of 96 blocks. His marquee game had been a 39-point/14-rebound effort against Lew Wallace High School of Gary, Indiana. Wayne Brumm, who had coached Luke Harangody, saw similarities in their games when viewing this game. Following the season, he was a 2010 Peoria Journal Star (All-Area) large-school All-Star along with Lawrence Alexander, among others. That season, the Associated Press All-State Class 3A first team consisted solely of players 6 ft 5 in (1.96 m) and under, while Bielfeldt earned second team recognition. He was also a second team All-State selection by the Illinois Basketball Coaches Association. While his future brother in law Leonard was a 2010 (All-Class) All-State boys basketball first team selection by the Chicago Tribune along with Rayvonte Rice, Jereme Richmond and juniors Ryan Boatright and Wayne Blackshear, junior Bielfeldt earned a special mention. Along with Richmond and Blackshear, Bielfeldt was one of only 3 players in the state to average 20 points and 10 rebounds that season. In the March 30, 2010, announcement that the Peoria Times-Observer would cease operations on April 28, both Elle and Max Bielfeldt were thanked for having lives that made for great content.

=== Senior year ===
By the time of his first live coaching evaluation on July 10, 2010, Bielfeldt only had offers from Wright State, Ball State, and Western Michigan. AAU teammate Robinson committed to Michigan's class of 2012 on September 14, 2010. That year, Notre Dame High School was expected to be an also-ran to Peoria High School and Manual High School in the area. Instead, they were the state's top-ranked class 3A team from December to March.

Bielfeldt began the season at the 2010 State Farm Tournament of Champions with a career-high 19 rebounds against Champaign Central High School on November 23 and following that with a career-high 40 points against McCluer High School of Florissant, Missouri on November 25. The career-high 40-point game fell one short of Gary Bielfeldt's 1954 senior year 41-point performance for Octavia High School. By the time Bielfeldt led the team to a 21–0 start, with eight wins over state-ranked teams, in early February, he had added scholarship offers from Valparaiso and Illinois-Chicago and non-scholarship interest from Dartmouth, Brown and Pennsylvania of the Ivy League, which does not offer athletic scholarships. Valpo and UIC were the leading contenders although following his official January on-campus visit to Ann Arbor, Michigan, an offer from Michigan and a Peoria Notre Dame visit by Michigan head coach John Beilein were pending. Michigan was looking him over because of their situation at the "4". At that time, Michigan was playing a Big Ten schedule with 6 ft 4 in (1.93 m) Zack Novak as its power forward. All of Michigan's regulars taller than 6 ft 6 in (1.98 m) were freshmen. Eventually, Beilein would take in a Peoria Notre Dame game on the same day as Illinois' coach Bruce Weber.

Bielfeldt finished his senior season with averages of 22.5 points, 11.4 rebounds and 4.6 blocks for 28–1 Peoria Notre Dame and became the school's all-time leader in points with 1,580 and rebounds with 886. The point total surpassed Brian Randle's 1,383. Bielfeldt's total was a three-year total, while Randle's was from a four-year varsity career. However, Randle's senior season stats (22.9 points, 12.8 rebounds and 5.2 blocks) compared well with Biefeldt's. Bielfedt's 20 double-doubles as a senior fell short of his own 21 as a junior.

Although the state of Illinois has produced many successful NBA players, including Peoria's Shaun Livingston, and Peoria has produced a lot of NCAA Division I talent, Bielfeldt, while still in high school, was considered possibly the best true back-to-the-basket, low-post player to hail from Peoria. In late February, the Illinois Mr. Basketball vote was considered to be a wide open six-horse race. Then on March 8, top-ranked Peoria Notre Dame was knocked out of the Illinois High School Association (IHSA) playoffs in the Class 3A Peoria Sectional semifinal at Renaissance Coliseum by Peoria High School. When the results were announced on March 30, Boatright and Chasson Randle tied for the award and Bielfeldt was not among the top 5.

The 2011 Class 3A Associated Press All-State first team consisted of Bielfeldt, Chasson Randle, Blackshear, Anthony Davis and Mychael Henry. His other Class 3A first-team All-State recognitions included Illinois Basketball Coaches Association, Chicago Sun-Times, The News-Gazette and Peoria Journal Star. He was named to the (All-Class) Chicago Tribune All-State second team along with Frank Kaminsky, Johnny Hill, David Sobolewski and sophomore Jabari Parker. In MaxPreps' final class of 2011 top 100 Bielfeldt was number 100. Bielfeldt earned the 2011 Peoria Journal Star Big-School Boys Basketball Player of the Year.

Illinois upgraded its preferred walk-on offer to Bielfeldt to a scholarship offer on February 14, 2011. Michigan offered Bielfeldt before his official Illinois February 26 visit, but Bielfeldt did not announce the offer until March 2 because Beilein had to inform other athletes that they were no longer in Michigan's plans. By the time Bielfeldt scheduled his Illinois visit to be before his high school playoffs, Florida, Penn State, Pittsburgh, Nebraska, Tulane and Butler had all become interested in him. The visit was February 26 and 27. Leonard hosted Bielfeldt during his official recruiting trip to Illinois and met Elle Leonard (née Bielfeldt) for the first time. Bielfeldt scheduled his trip to Ann Arbor, Michigan for his official visit on March 14, 2011.

Despite his family's ties to the Illinois Fighting Illini, Bielfeldt had a ceremonial verbal commitment event at his high school library on March 25 to announce his selection of Michigan. On April 13, Michigan announced that Bielfeldt had signed his National Letter of Intent. Beilfeld joined a 2011 incoming Michigan class that included 2011 Ohio Mr. Basketball point guard Trey Burke, as well as Carlton Brundidge and Sai Tummala. His decision made him the first Peorian to choose a Big Ten Conference school other than Illinois for basketball in over a decade.

College recruiting
Name	Hometown	School	Height	Weight	Commit date
Max Bielfeldt; PF	Peoria, Illinois	Notre Dame High School (Illinois)	6 ft 8 in (2.03 m)	240 lb (110 kg)	Mar 25, 2011
Max Bielfeldt; PF	Recruit ratings: Scout: Rivals: (87)				
Overall recruit ranking:
Note: In many cases, Scout, Rivals, 247Sports, On3, and ESPN may conflict in their listings of height and weight.; In these cases, the average was taken. ESPN grades are on a 100-point scale.; Sources: "Michigan 2011 Basketball Commitments". Rivals.; "2011 Michigan Basketball Commits". Scout.; "ESPN". ESPN.; "Scout.com Team Recruiting Rankings". Scout.; "2011 Team Ranking". Rivals.

== College ==
=== Michigan (2011–2015) ===
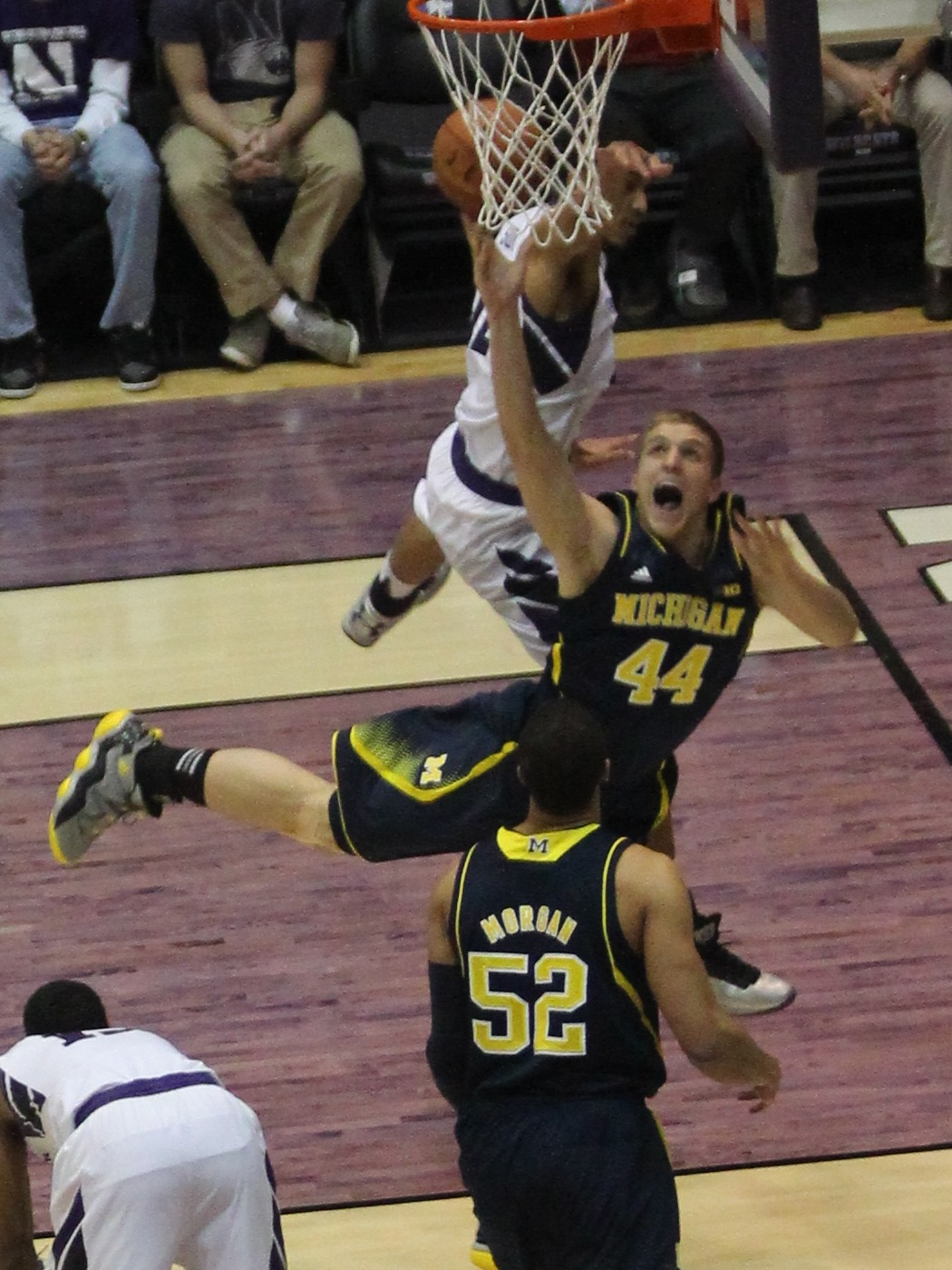
Bielfeldt (No. 44) for the 2012–13 Wolverines

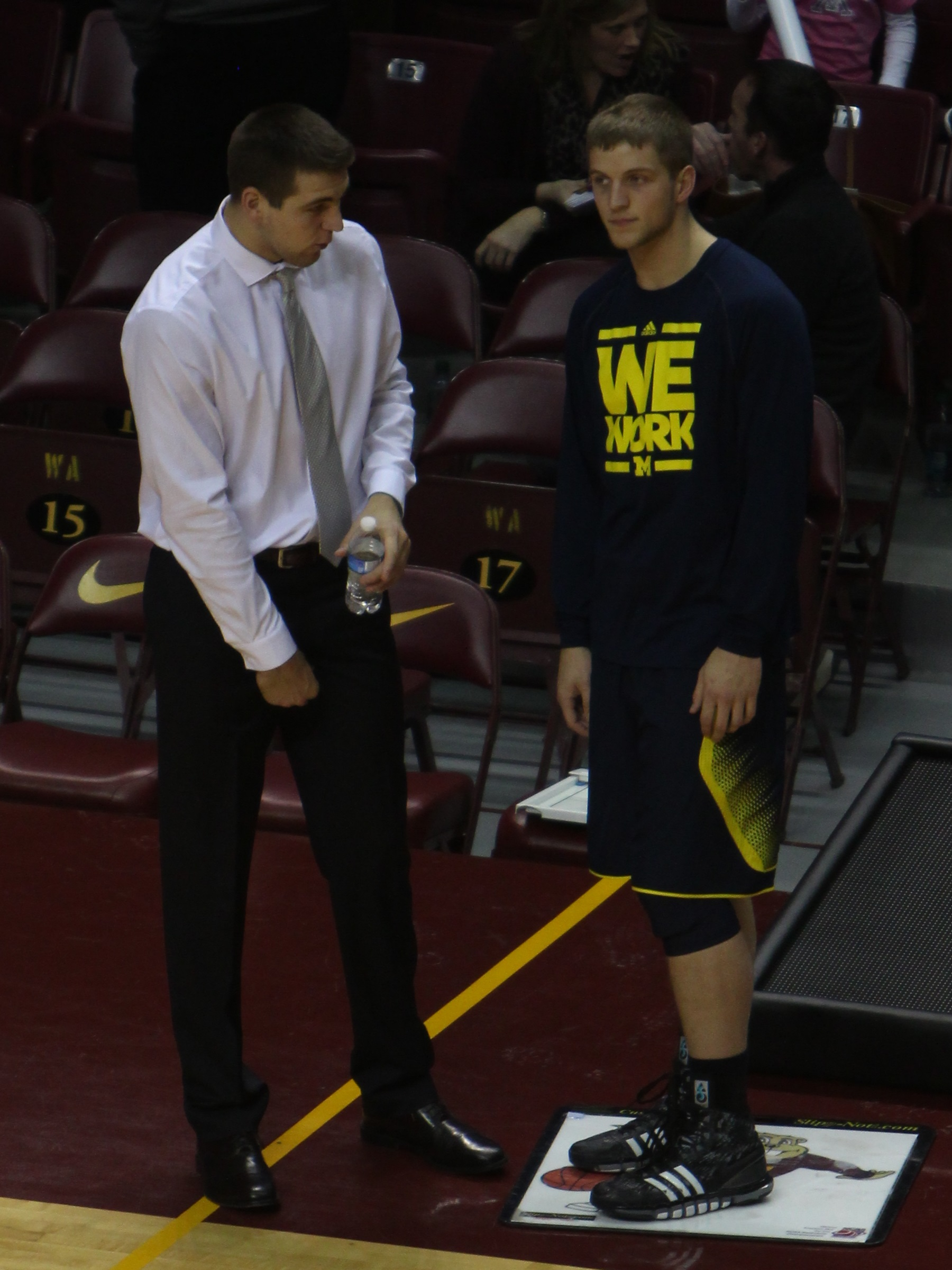
Bielfeldt (right) for the 2013–14 Wolverines with Mitch McGary

==== Freshman season ====
Bielfeldt redshirted as a true freshman for the 2011–12 Wolverines. Part of the reason for the redshirt was injuries to his hip and knee. The March 4, 2012, victory over Penn State clinched a share of the 2011–12 Big Ten Conference season regular season championship. For the 2012–13 and 2013–14 Wolverines, Biefeldt shared the low post minutes with Mitch McGary, Jordan Morgan and Jon Horford. While supporting Morgan, Horford and McGary, he was rarely healthy due to leg and hip injuries.

==== Sophomore season ====
In the campus portion of the NIT Season Tip-Off on November 12, 2012, against IUPUI, Bielfeldt posted a season-high 6 rebounds in 4 minutes of play. Then, the following night against Cleveland State, he added 5 rebounds in 7 minutes for a total of 11 rebounds in 11 minutes. When Michigan visited Peoria's Carver Arena to play Bradley on December 1, the team was ranked number 3 in the nation and Bielfeldt played 9 minutes, posting 2 points and 2 rebounds. It was Bielfeldt's first time playing at Carver Arena, which had become the home of the annual IHSA state final four basketball games. By January 27, 2013, Michigan had moved up to number 2 before visiting State Farm Center (then known as Assembly Hall) to play Illinois. Bielfeldt, who had previously played in the arena in 2010, contributed 4 points and 2 rebounds in his 6 minutes of playing time, but the fans heckled him and he missed some free throws, air balling his first shot and going 2–for–4 from the line. Michigan lost the April 8 championship game of the 2013 NCAA Division I men's basketball tournament to Midwest number one seed Louisville by an 82–76 score. Louisville's championship has since been vacated by the NCAA, as well as all its wins from 2011 to 2015. This followed an escort recruitment scandal at the university.

==== Junior season ====
On March 1, Michigan clinched a share of the Big Ten regular-season championship by defeating Minnesota 66–56. The Wolverines visited an Illinois team on March 4, 2014, which had held its previous four opponents under 50 points. Michigan scored 52 points in the first half and went on to win 84–53. With the win, Michigan clinched its first outright (unshared) Big Ten Conference championship since 1985–86. Michigan entered the 2014 Big Ten Conference men's basketball tournament as the number-one seed for the first time. The Wolverines defeated Illinois 64–63, after losing a 13-point second-half lead and scoring a game-winning basket with 7.9 seconds remaining. The Wolverines were seeded number two in the Midwest region of the 2014 NCAA Division I men's basketball tournament. Michigan's run to the Elite Eight gave the Wolverines' a school record 59 wins in a two-year period. Bielfeldt only played 89 minutes in 19 games during the season. Following the season McGary, Robinson and Nik Stauskas left early for the 2014 NBA draft.

==== Senior season ====
Beilein announced on June 3, 2014, that Bielfeldt had undergone hip surgery and was expected to miss most of summer 2014. In July, the team reclassified Bielfeldt from a redshirt junior to a senior, which freed up Bielfeldt's scholarship for the Class of 2015, implying Bielfeldt would play his final year of eligibility elsewhere. Following Morgan's graduation, McGary's NBA departure and Horford's transfer, Bielfeldt was the lone remaining upperclass big for the 2014–15 Wolverines. When Caris LeVert was lost to injury, he and Spike Albrecht were the only players on the roster with more than a year experience. Nonetheless, "Moose", as he was known in Michigan basketball circles, continued to serve as leader of the scout team as he had during most of his Michigan tenure, while freshman Ricky Doyle and redshirt freshman Mark Donnal competed for the "5" spot.

On November 17, the team opened the Progressive Legends Classic at home against Bucknell. The game was highlighted by Bielfeldt's career-high 18-point performance. Beilfeldt was Michigan's only senior on March 7 senior night. That night, Michigan won its Big Ten Conference finale against Rutgers to finish the regular season at 15–15 (8–10 Big Ten). The game marked career-high assist (3) and rebounding (13) by Bielfeldt. Bielfeldt made his first career start and earned his first double-double with 14 points. His role increased over the course of his senior season at Michigan. Bielfeldt only played 6.8 minutes per game during the first five games, but averaged over 20 minutes in the final 15 games. Over the course of 30 games that season, he averaged 5.1 points and 3.6 rebounds. In his 69-game Michigan career, he averaged 2.8 points and 2.3 rebounds. Without Bielfeld, Michigan may have fared much worse than 16–16. He was the team's Sixth Man of the Year.

==== Transfer ====
On April 21, 2015, Bielfeldt was released from his athletic scholarship with one year of eligibility remaining. Head coach Beilein decided that he wanted to develop his young front line players Doyle, Donnal and D. J. Wilson. On April 24, he visited Iowa State and by the 25th he had offers from Boston College, Kansas State, Iowa State, Bradley, Stanford and DePaul. At the University of Michigan, he earned a bachelor's degree in sport management in 2015. In late May, Bielfeldt was worried about the Chicago Bulls's interest in Iowa State coach Fred Hoiberg. Within days, the Bulls hired Hoiberg. In June 2015, Bielfeldt announced that he had decided to use his redshirt year to play for the 2015–16 Indiana Hoosiers after the Hoosiers dismissed two forwards (Devin Davis and Hanner Mosquera-Perea) from the team the month before. Bielfeldt had considered several midwest schools and DePaul, Nebraska and Iowa State were his other finalists, with DePaul being eliminated before the official announcement. Bielfeldt's intention was to graduate with a second degree in a year. He chose the 15-month strategic management masters over pursuing a degree similar to his father's agricultural economics degree at Iowa State. Beilein attempted to block Bielfeldt from transferring within the Big Ten, but Indiana won an appeal.

=== Indiana (2015–16) ===
By the time Big Ten Media day rolled around in October, Indiana had dismissed another forward and had two more limited by injuries. Bielfeldt adjusted to the very different coaching style of Tom Crean. Bielfeldt kept in touch with his former roommate LeVert and realized that he left just before a major change in coaching style at Michigan. The arrival of Bielfeldt and Thomas Bryant enabled Indiana to gameplan with a more traditional lineup rather than the previous smaller lineups. In addition to size, Bielfeldt provided poise, maturity and leadership to a program beset with turmoil due to drug and alcohol infractions. Bielfeldt hoped to help be a leader and pledged to Peorian and former Indiana Hoosier A. J. Guyton that he would help stabilize the program. Bielfeldt started in both exhibition games. He was in the starting lineup early in the season, but Crean changed the lineup after an upset loss in the 2015 Maui Invitational to Wake Forest.

Bielfeldt scored in double digits in three consecutive games off the bench to start a 3-game win streak for the Hoosiers against Morehead State (12 points, Dec. 5), IPFW (11 points, Dec. 9), and McNeese State (11 points, Dec. 12), which was noted by the press and appreciated by Crean. In the December 30 Big Ten Conference season opener on the road against Rutgers, Bielfeldt tied his career high with 18 points and established a new career high with 14 rebounds off the bench on a night when Bryant had foul trouble to help Indiana extend its win streak to 6. Bielfeldt scored in double digits in three consecutive games off the bench again to extend the win streak to 12 against Minnesota (10 points, Jan. 16), Illinois (16 points/8 rebounds/3 steals/2 blocks, Jan. 19) in the rivalry game in which he scored the basket to give Yogi Ferrell the Indiana basketball career assists record, and Northwestern (13 points, Jan. 23). When Bielfeldt returned to Ann Arbor, Michigan to play his old Michigan teammates on February 2 at the Crisler Center, Indiana ended the first half on a 25–0 run. Bielfeldt had a +25 plus–minus for the half. He led the team with 7 rebounds and added 5 points and 2 assists. On February 14 against (AP Poll #8/Coaches Poll #9) Michigan State, Bielfeldt made his fourth start of the season in a matchup situation. Crean felt he would matchup against Matt Costello better than regular starter Collin Hartman and allow Bryant to matchup against Deyonta Davis. Bielfeldt posted a double-double with 15 points and 10 rebounds, keeping Indiana in the game in the first half with 10 points. Bielfeldt played all 31 regular season games for Indiana, including five starts, helping Indiana to a 17–0 home record and became the first men's basketball player to earn Big Ten titles with two different teams. Following the 2015–16 Big Ten season, Bielfeldt, was voted the Big Ten Sixth Man of the Year by the coaches for his contributions to the regular season champion Hoosiers, which included 8.0 points, 4.5 rebounds, a 51.6% field goal percentage and a 43.6% 3-point field goal percentage.

In the 2016 Big Ten Conference men's basketball tournament, No. 1-seeded (#10/#10) Indiana was defeated by Michigan in the quarterfinals 72–69. In the 2016 NCAA Division I men's basketball tournament, Bielfeldt posted 10 points and 7 rebounds against Chattanooga on March 17. When Indiana reached the round of 16 against the number one seed North Carolina on March 25, Bielfeldt contributed 15 points off the bench, but it was not enough against the hot-shooting Tar Heels.

== Post graduate ==
After he completed his athletic eligibility at Indiana, he opted to complete his master's program rather than pursue international professional basketball possibilities. He studied in the Kelley School of Business and was on pace to receive a master's degree in strategic management in the fall 2016. His coursework was almost entirely online. Michigan teammate Albrecht matched Bielfeldt's accomplishment of earning Big Ten Championships with two different teams with the 2016–17 Purdue Boilermakers.
