= Mitch McGary =

American basketball player (born 1992)

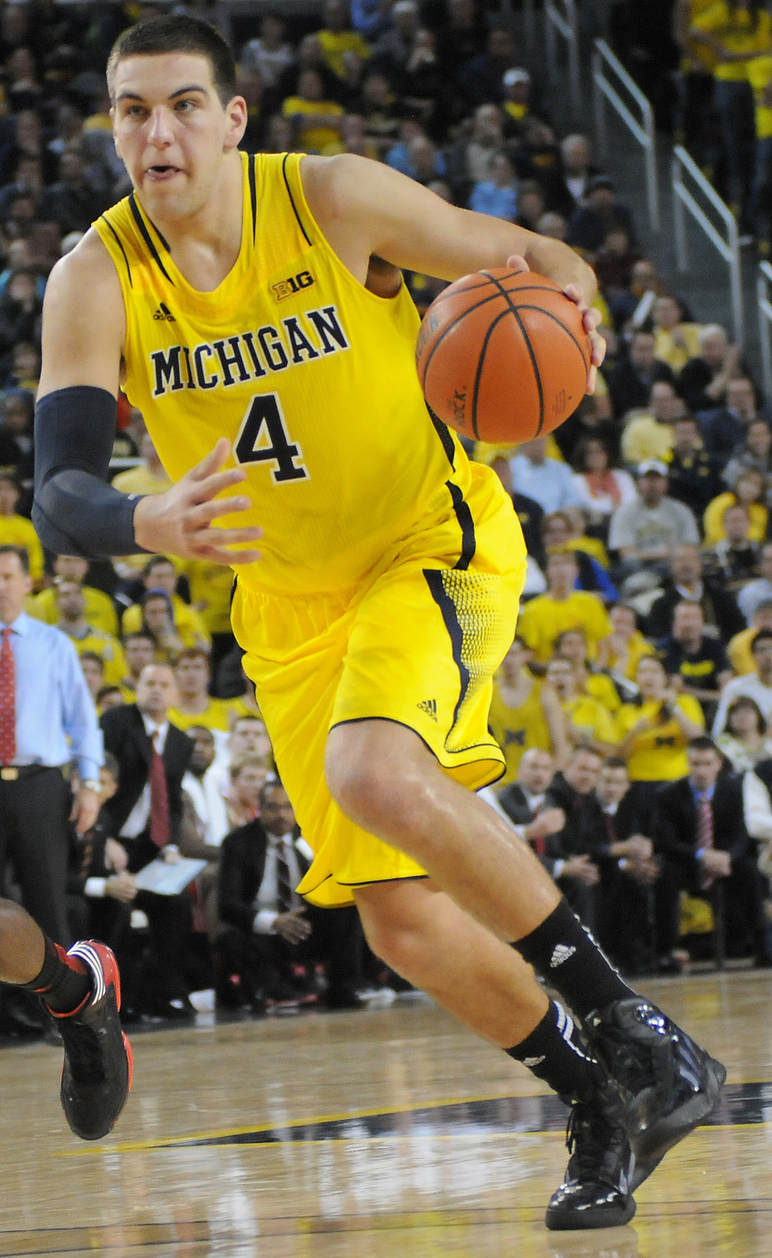
- McGary with Michigan in 2012

Personal information
- Born: June 6, 1992 (age 34) Chesterton, Indiana, U.S.
- Listed height: 6 ft 10 in (2.08 m)
- Listed weight: 255 lb (116 kg)

Career information
- High school: Chesterton (Chesterton, Indiana); Brewster Academy (Wolfeboro, New Hampshire)
- College: Michigan (2012–2014)
- NBA draft: 2014: 1st round, 21st overall pick
- Drafted by: Oklahoma City Thunder
- Playing career: 2014–2016
- Position: Power forward
- Number: 33

Career history
- 2014–2016: Oklahoma City Thunder
- 2014–2016: →Oklahoma City Blue

Career highlights
- First-team Parade All-American (2012)
- Stats at NBA.com
- Stats at Basketball Reference

Mitchell Neil William McGary (born June 6, 1992) is an American former professional basketball player. A native of Chesterton, Indiana, McGary declared for the NBA draft after completing his sophomore season for the 2013–14 Michigan Wolverines men's basketball team. He was drafted 21st overall by the Oklahoma City Thunder in the 2014 NBA draft.

At the time of his National Letter of Intent signing with Michigan Wolverines basketball, ESPN.com and Scout.com ranked McGary as the number two player in the United States high school class of 2012, while Rivals.com ranked him as the number three prospect. He was not only the consensus top power forward recruit in the nation, but also the top big man according to most sources at the time. After his signing, however, McGary fell down in the rankings as his underdeveloped offensive skills became apparent.

At Michigan, McGary became the sixth man as well as the leading shot blocker and rebounder for the 2012–13 Michigan Wolverines men's basketball team. During the season, he was twice named Big Ten Freshman of the Week. He became the regular starter during the 2013 NCAA Division I men's basketball tournament and earned South All-Regional Team and NCAA All-Tournament Team recognition as he helped the team reach the championship game. He led all Big Ten freshmen in rebounding.

== Early life ==
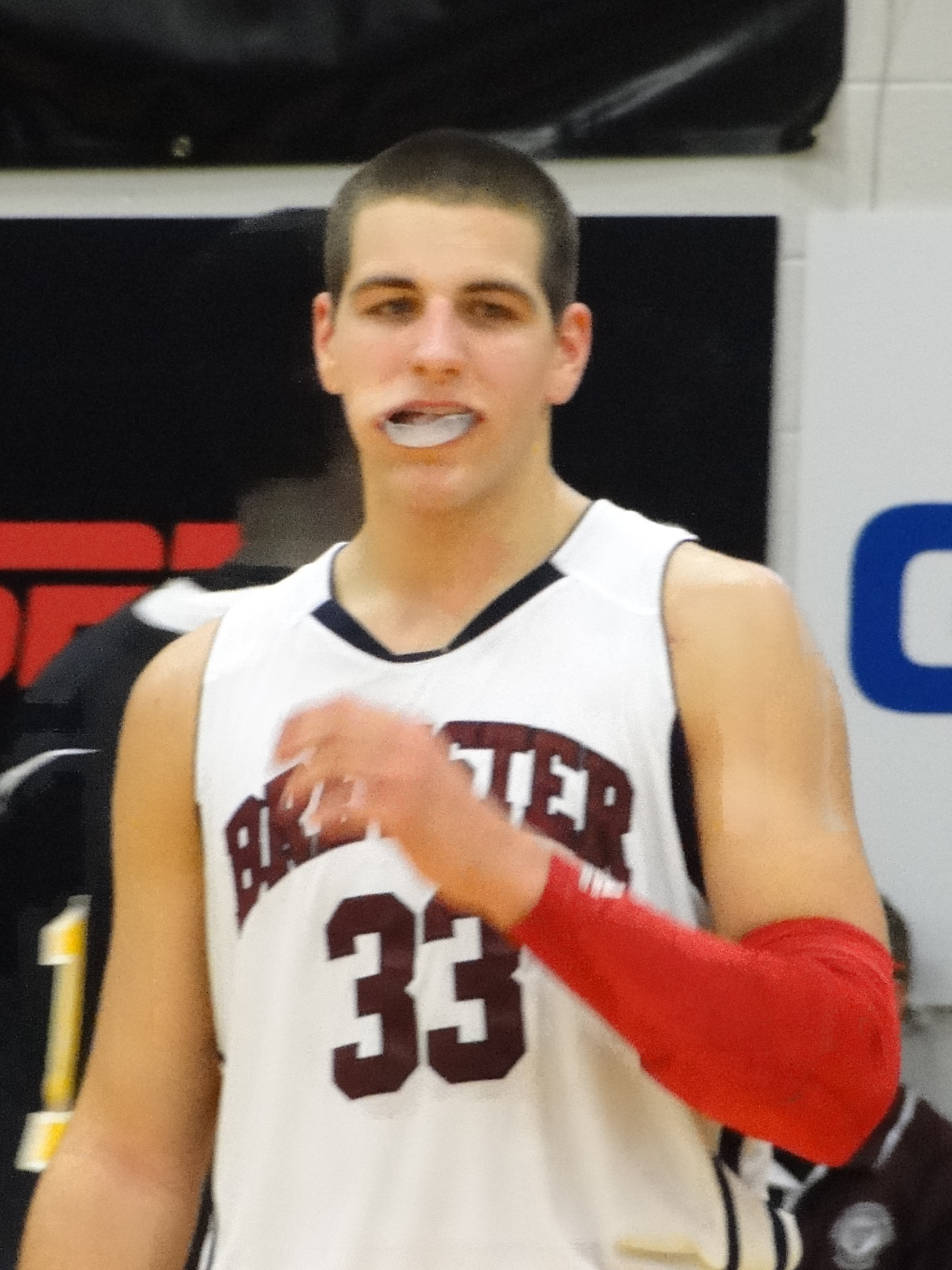
McGary at Brewster, 2011

Mitch McGary was born on June 6, 1992, and grew up in the Chesterton, Indiana, area. He played in YMCA and Amateur Athletic Union (AAU) basketball leagues as a youth, and his father, Tim, who had never played organized sports, coached him until fourth grade. McGary's mother is named Valerie. When McGary was younger, his father thought his athletic future was in baseball. McGary played on the 2007–08 Chesterton High School junior varsity team as a freshman, while eventual three-time Michigan Wolverines captain Zack Novak was a senior on the varsity team. That year he also was a 6-foot-6-inch (1.98 m), 190-pound (86 kg) freshman tight end on the high school football team, but his father made him quit football as he continued to grow. His local Indiana SPY Players AAU basketball team included future Michigan teammates Max Bielfeldt and Glenn Robinson III, son of Glenn Robinson. McGary joined the varsity basketball team the following season and played two years. McGary is afflicted with attention deficit hyperactivity disorder. He eventually transferred to Brewster Academy, a prep school in Wolfeboro, New Hampshire, to repeat his junior year because his parents thought the discipline would be good for him. Before transferring to Brewster, McGary was the tallest kid in his school and in the basketball conference that he played in. McGary shoots left-handed.

As late as March 2011, McGary ranked 92nd in the national class of 2012 by Rivals.com. During the LeBron James Skills Academy in July, McGary stood out as the best player in attendance. He was invited to participate in the 5th annual Nike Global Challenge the following month. Due to an ankle injury he did not participate. However, later that month, he participated in the Boost Mobile Elite 24 event, where he shattered a backboard. His other 2011 summer camps included Pittsburgh Jam Fest, the National Basketball Players Association Top 100 camp and the Under Armour Best of the Best Camp, where he was the most valuable player. McGary scheduled his official Michigan visit for the beginning of September. McGary completed his official campus visits to University of Michigan, University of North Carolina, and Duke University, in that order, by October 4. However, due to injuries suffered a few weeks earlier while shattering the backboard, he only played pick-up games at Duke. He also made an unofficial visit to Florida prior to these official visits.

His reported best friend, Robinson had committed to Michigan on September 14, 2010. In a press conference broadcast on ESPNU on November 3, 2011, McGary announced his verbal commitment to Michigan over his other two finalist Florida and Duke. Within hours of the commitment, ESPN ranked Michigan's recruiting class the fifth best in the nation. After several other schools announced their commitments, Michigan, which had been outside the top 25 at the end of October, ranked the number 7 class in the nation, according to ESPN. He waited until November 9 to sign his National Letter of Intent so that his parents, who were still living in Indiana, could be present. Both of his parents had liked head coach Mike Krzyzewski and had hoped that he would choose Duke. At the time of their November 2011 National Letter of Intent signings, Nik Stauskas, Robinson and McGary gave Michigan a consensus top 10 entering class for its 2012 class.

McGary was technically eligible for the 2012 NBA draft. Brewster entered the 2012 NEPSAC Class AAA Boys' Basketball Tournament undefeated and ranked number 1 in the nation according to the Five-Star Basketball Rankings published in Sports Illustrated, but lost in the semifinals of the tournament to Northfield Mount Hermon School, who was led by future teammate Spike Albrecht, in overtime on March 2. In the overtime period, McGary missed a game-tying free throw with 17.3 seconds remaining. His Brewster team defeated Massanutten Military Academy and Notre Dame Prep to reach the March 7 championship game in the National Prep Championship against Hargrave Military Academy. Brewster won the National Prep Championship Game. The 2011–12 Brewster team was reported to have eight future Division I basketball players, including Florida State commit Aaron Thomas, Xavier commit Semaj Christon, NC State commit T. J. Warren, and JaKarr Sampson. JaKarr Sampson earned both the 2012 National Prep Championship MVP and New England Preparatory School Athletic Council (NEPSAC) AAA Player of the Year, leaving McGary with a supporting role.

McGary was invited to participate in the four-team All-American Championship along with future teammate Robinson in New Orleans on April 1, 2012. Six days later, McGary represented USA Basketball at the 15th annual Nike Hoops Summit as part of the 2012 USA Junior National Select Team. Following the season, he was named as one of 40 Parade All-Americans.

During his senior season, scouts became aware that McGary was less polished offensively than he had appeared. By January, his ranking had been reduced from number 2 overall to about number 20. He eventually settled between 26th and 30th by Scout.com, ESPN and Rivals.com in the final class of 2012 overall rankings.

College recruiting
Name	Hometown	School	Height	Weight	Commit date
Mitch McGary; PF	Chesterton, IN	Chesterton High School (IN)/Brewster Academy (NH)	6 ft 10 in (2.08 m)	247.5 lb (112.3 kg)	Mar 11, 2011
Mitch McGary; PF	Recruit ratings: Scout: Rivals: (96)				
Overall recruit ranking: Scout: 26, 10 (C) Rivals: 30, 8 (C) ESPN: 27, 5 (PF), 4 (IN)
Note: In many cases, Scout, Rivals, 247Sports, On3, and ESPN may conflict in their listings of height and weight.; In these cases, the average was taken. ESPN grades are on a 100-point scale.; Sources: "Michigan 2012 Basketball Commitments". Rivals.; "2012 Michigan Basketball Commits". Scout.; "ESPN". ESPN.; "Scout.com Team Recruiting Rankings". Scout.; "2012 Team Ranking". Rivals.

== College career ==
The 2011–12 Michigan Wolverines men's basketball team had been co-champions of 2011–12 Big Ten Conference, but lost both of its co-captains, Zack Novak and Stu Douglass, to graduation and three players as transfers. The team was returning a nucleus of All-Big Ten players Trey Burke and Tim Hardaway Jr.

=== Freshman ===
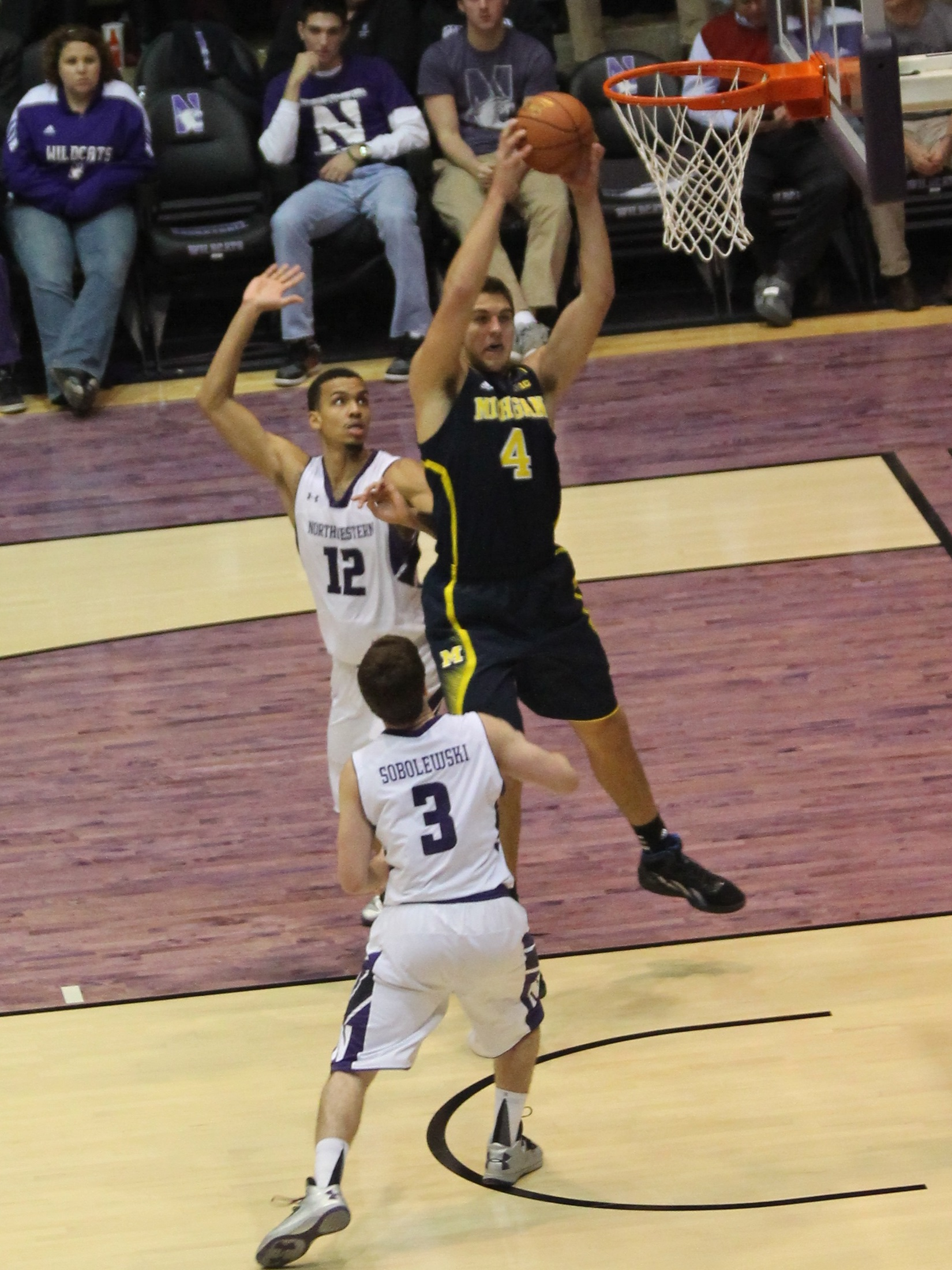
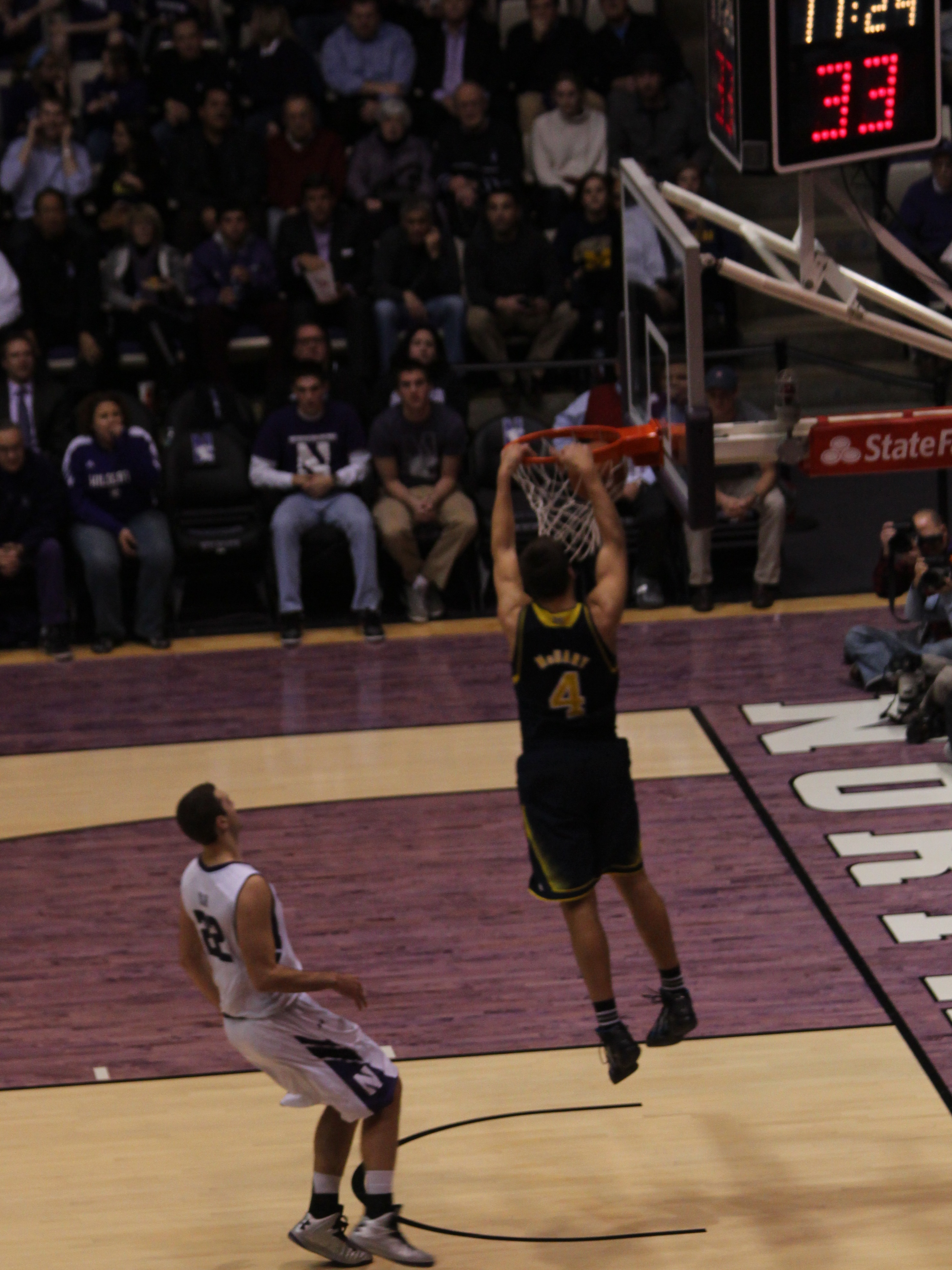
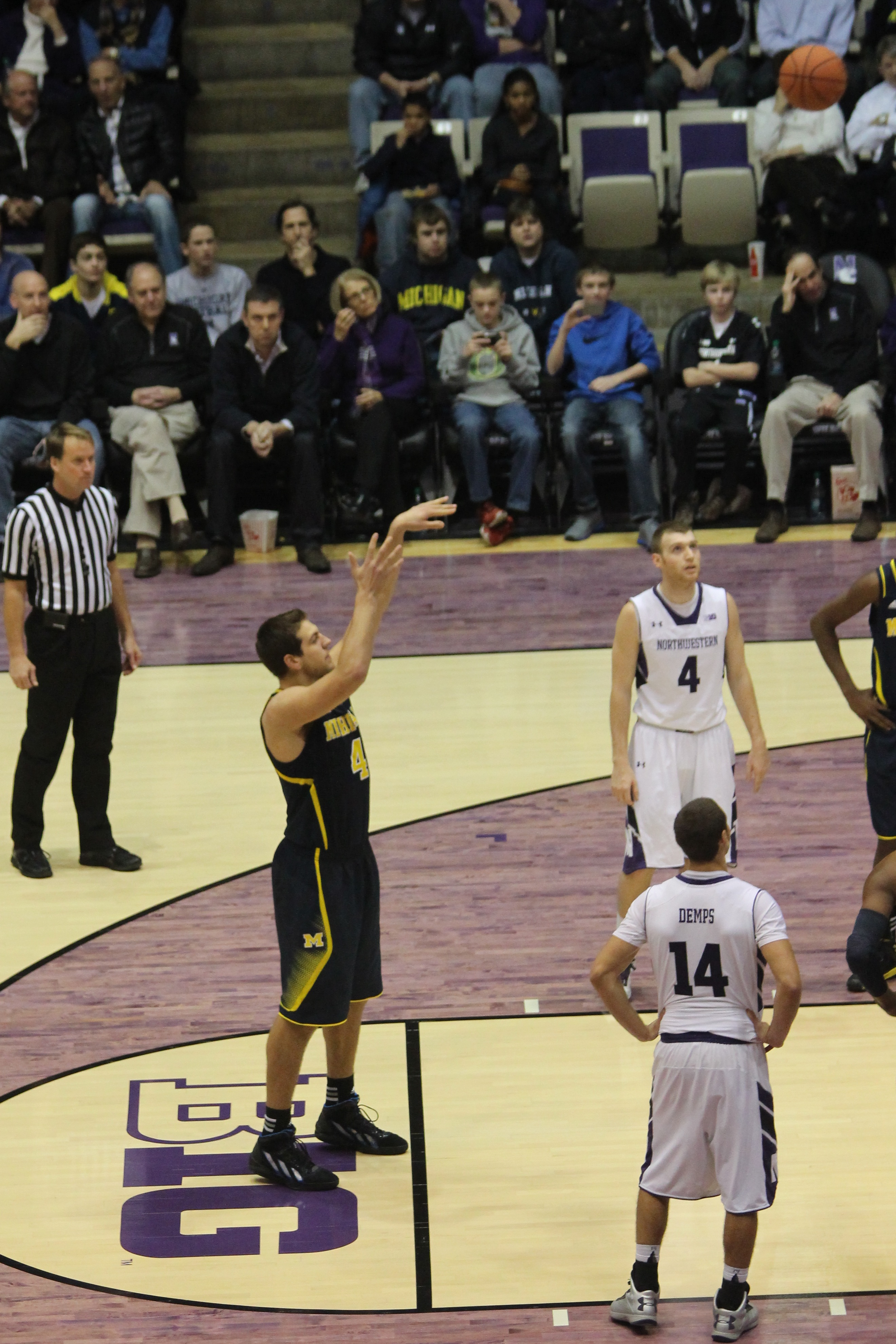
A rebound (left), slam dunk (center) and a free throw (right) by McGary in 2012–13 Big Ten Conference men's basketball season opener on January 3 against Northwestern

In the third game of the season and the third of his career, McGary posted a game-high 9 rebounds in 17 minutes of play off the bench against Cleveland State on November 13. McGary also went 3-for-3 on his field goals. McGary reached double figures in scoring for the first time December 4 against Western Michigan (Michigan's eighth game of the season) when he scored 10 points on 5-for-5 shooting in 14 minutes of play off the bench. He had his first 10-rebound game on December 11 against the Binghamton Bearcats. On December 20, he posted his first double-double with a then career-high 11 rebounds and 10 points as well as a then career-high 3 steals in just 18 minute of play against Eastern Michigan. On December 24, he was recognized as Big Ten Freshman of the Week. On January 6, McGary tied then career high with 11 rebounds, tied a then career high 2 assists and set a career high with 3 blocked shots against Iowa. On January 28, Michigan was ranked number one in the AP Poll with 51 of the 65 first place votes. It marked the first time Michigan ranked atop the AP Poll since the Fab Five 1992–93 team did so on December 5, 1992.

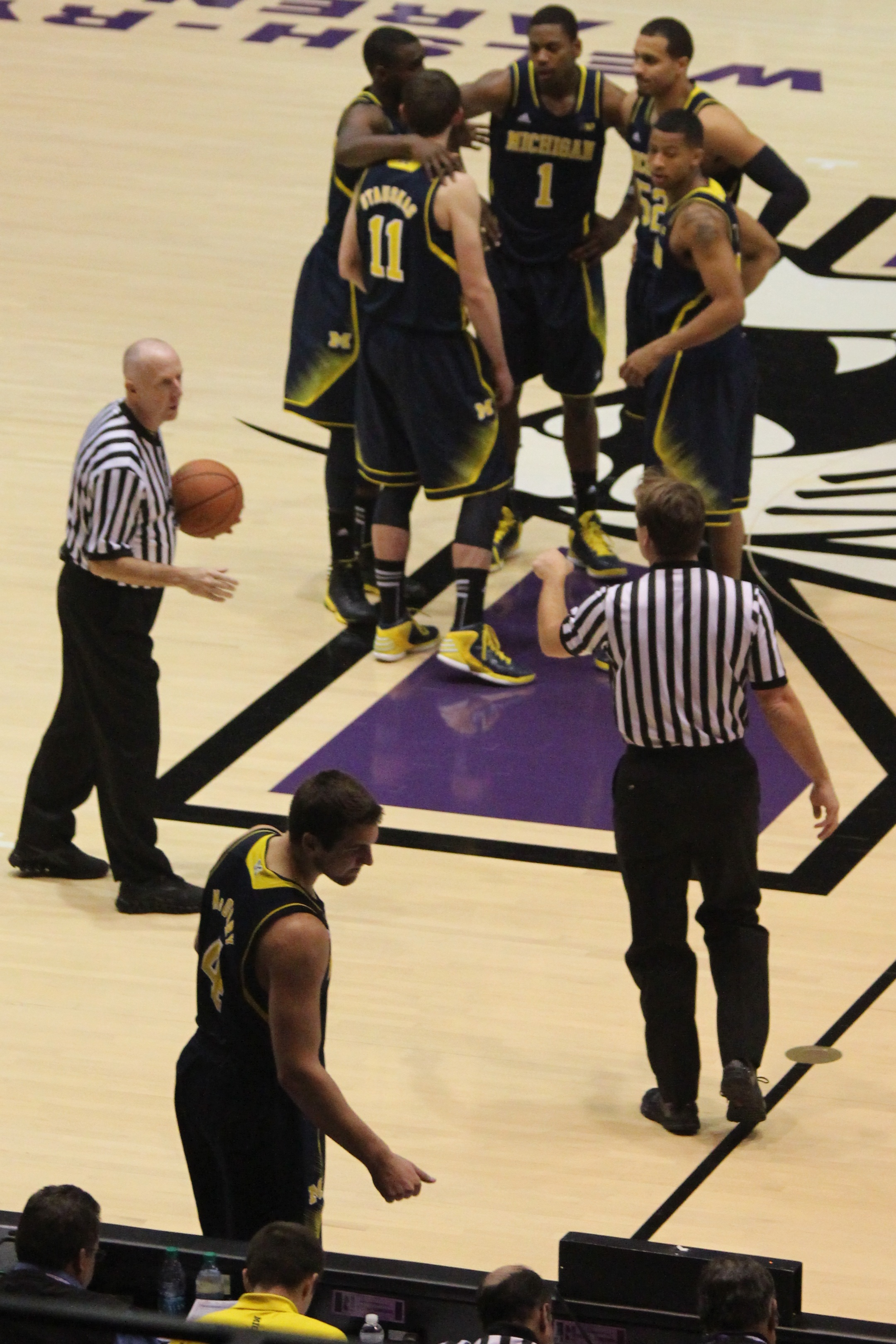
Sixth man McGary checking into Big Ten season opener at Welsh-Ryan Arena (starters clockwise from front: Stauskas, Hardaway Jr., Robinson III, Morgan, and Burke)

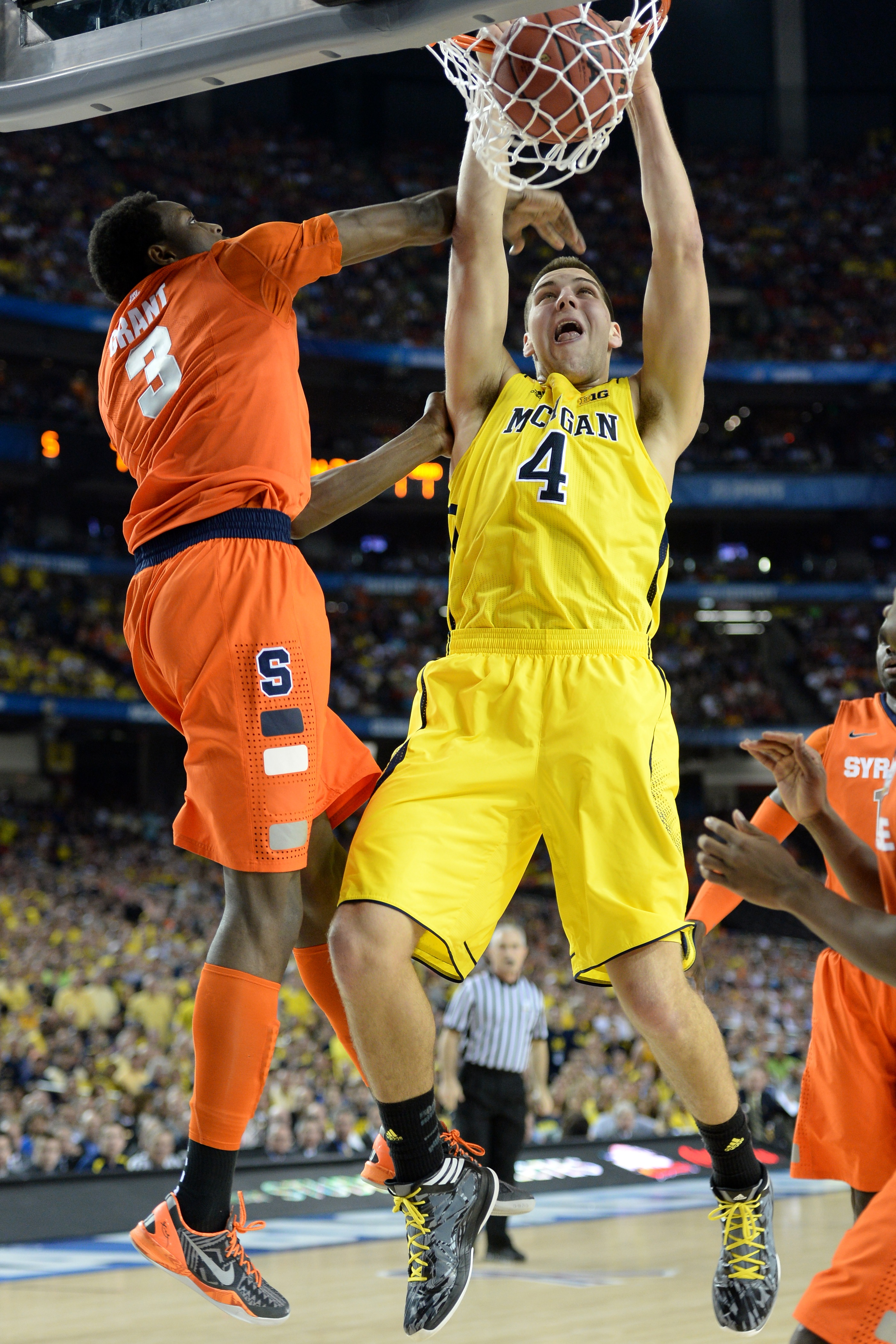
McGary dunks against Jerami Grant in the 2013 NCAA Division I men's basketball tournament on April 6

McGary played a career-high 29 minutes, tallying then career highs of 14 points and 4 steals, along with 6 rebounds, on February 5 in an overtime victory against Ohio State. For his efforts in two overtime games during the week, McGary earned his second Big Ten Freshman of the Week honor on February 11. On February 12 in Michigan's 25th game of the season, McGary made his first appearance in the starting lineup in the rivalry game against Michigan State. Michigan lost 75–52 with McGary posting a team-high 4 rebounds. On March 14, in the first round of the 2013 Big Ten Conference men's basketball tournament against Penn State, McGary posted his second career double-double, reaching 10 points and 10 rebounds in the first half, but only adding one more rebound in the second half.

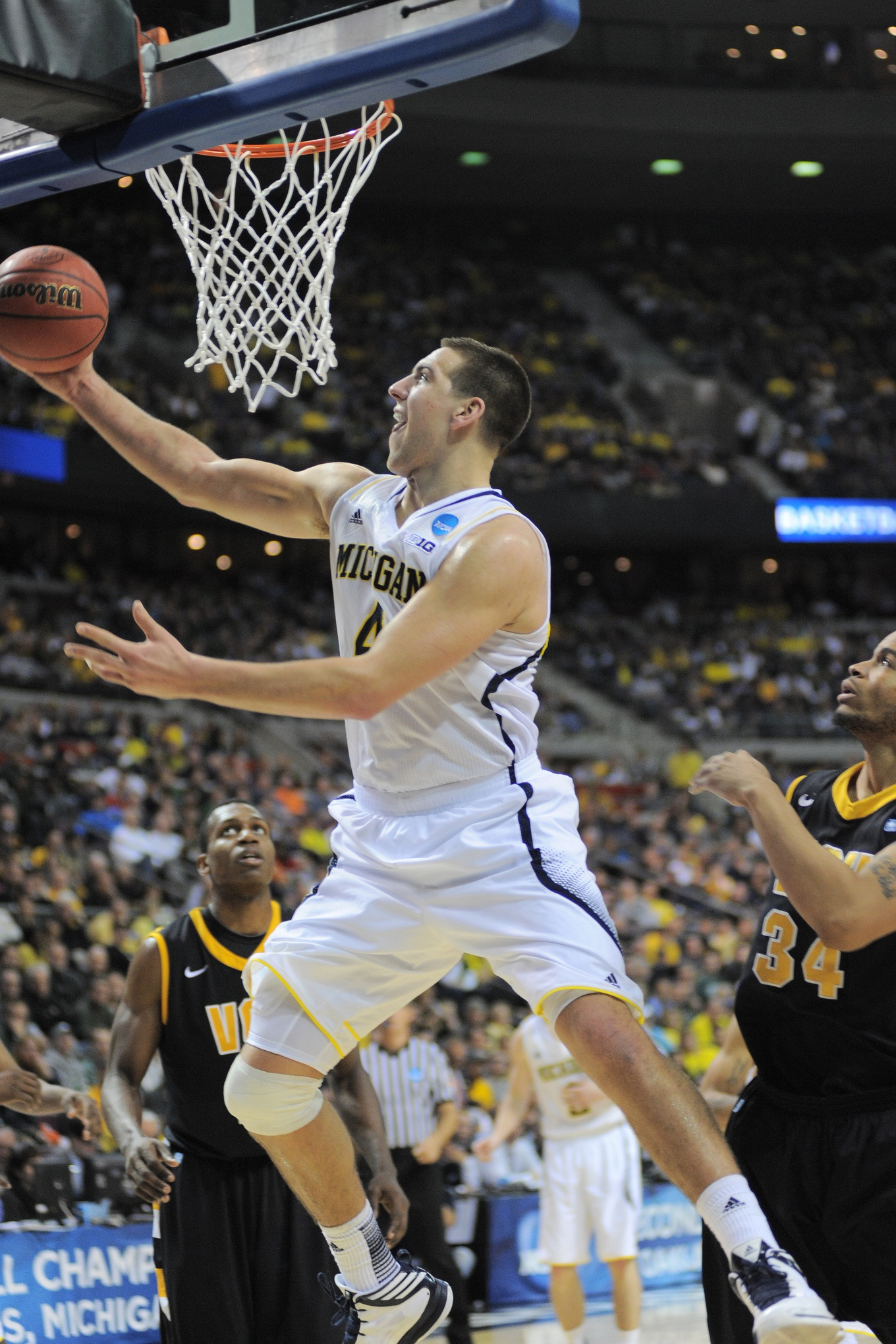
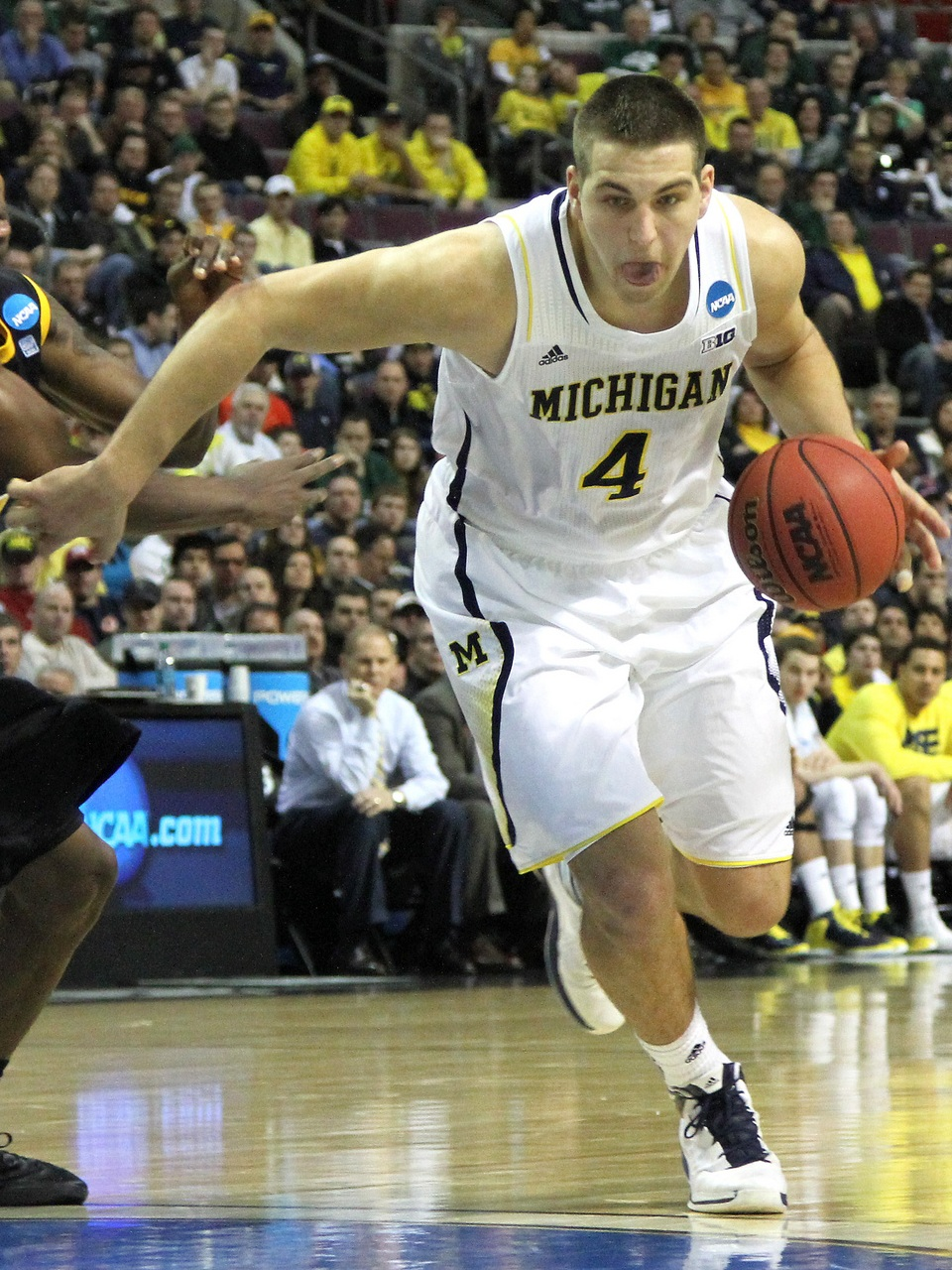
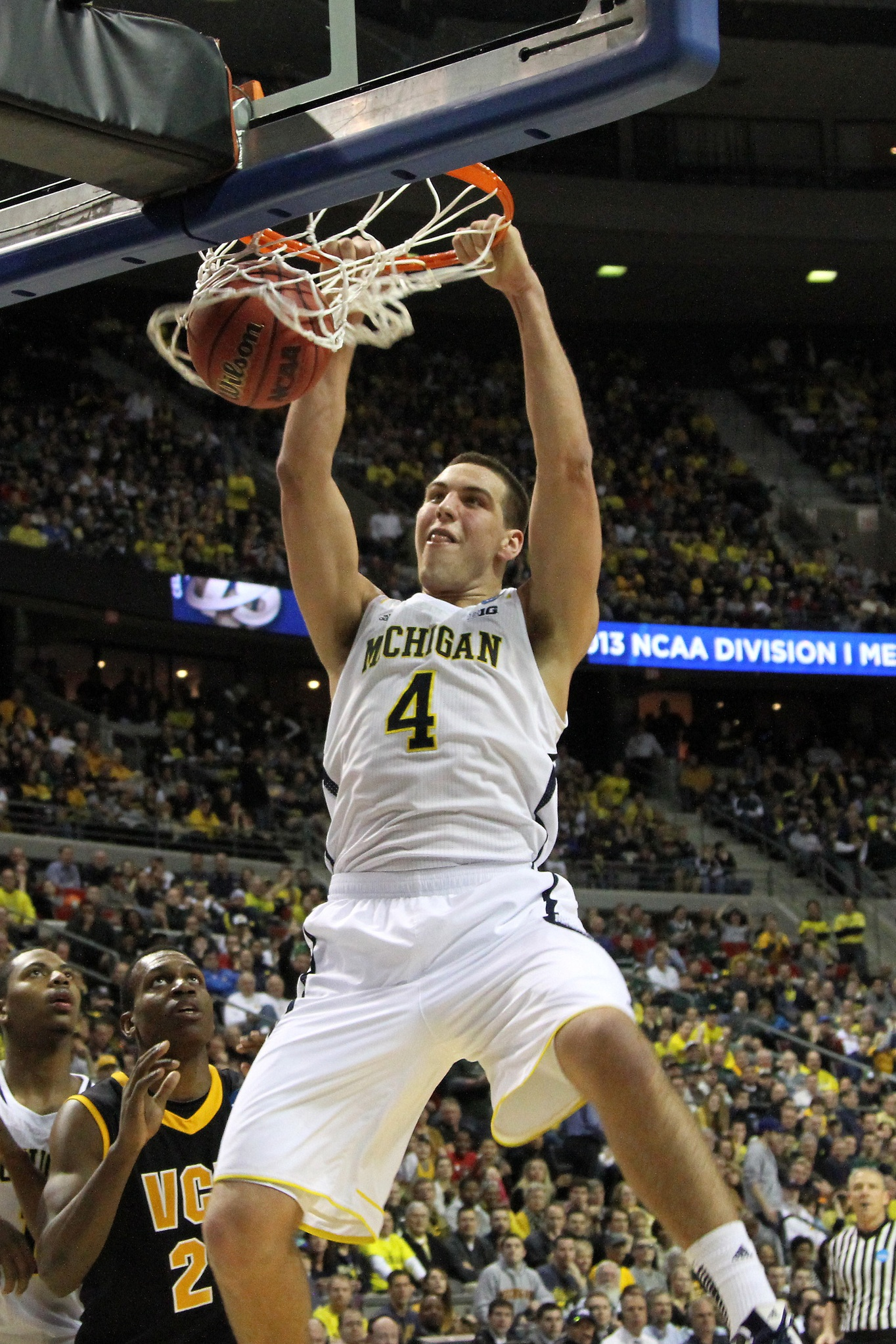
McGary during the 2013 NCAA Division I men's basketball tournament on March 23

Prior to the 2013 NCAA Division I men's basketball tournament, Jeff Goodman of CBSSports.com named Michigan with McGary first among tournament teams in terms of having the most future NBA talent on its roster (in the absence of Kentucky who was relegated to the 2013 National Invitation Tournament). As a number four seed, Michigan defeated its first NCAA tournament opponent, South Dakota State, 71–56 on March 21 with McGary making his third start of the season and contributing 13 points and 9 rebounds. The 27th victory of the season gave the team its most wins in 20 years and matched head coach John Beilein's career high. Two days later McGary made his fourth career start, adding career highs of 21 points on 10-for-11 shooting and 14 rebounds against VCU in a 78–53 victory. His 10–11 (90.9%) field goal percentage is the best shooting performance by a Wolverine in the NCAA Tournament (min 10 attempts). In the first two tournament games combined, he shot 16-for-20. On March 29 against Kansas, McGary earned his third consecutive start and 5th start of the season. He scored a career-high 25 points and career-high tying 14 rebounds, marking his second consecutive and fourth career double-double. He shot 12-for-17 in the game. McGary joined Blake Griffin (2009) as the only two players in the last 15 NCAA Division I men's basketball tournaments to achieve 14 or more rebounds and 21 or more points in back-to-back games. With his tournament run, McGary became the Big Ten Conference leader in field goal percentage (although he slipped just below Victor Oladipo at the end of the season). In the regional finals on March 31 against Florida, McGary contributed 9 rebounds and 11 points, including 8 points as Michigan opened up a 13–0 lead to start the game. McGary also added a career-high 5 steals during his fourth consecutive start. 5 steals tied Rickey Green (1977) and Tom Stanton (1977) as the best single-NCAA Tournament game performance in school history, but was surpassed by Derrick Walton in 2018. McGary and Stauskas joined Most Outstanding Player Trey Burke on the 5-man South All-Regional team. Following the regional championship postgame prayer and with Mrs. Beilein's consent, McGary and Tim Hardaway Jr. gave head coach John Beilein a gatorade shower. In the April 6 national semifinal against Syracuse, McGary contributed 10 points and 12 rebounds along with a career-high 6 assists. Two nights later, Michigan lost in the championship game to Louisville by an 82–76 margin as McGary contributed 6 points, 6 rebounds, a steal, a block and an assist. McGary made the 7-man All-Tournament team (which was revised multiple times) along with teammates Burke and Albrecht. In his six NCAA Tournament starts, he averaged a double-double with 14.3 points and 10.8 rebounds. McGary finished the season as the Big Ten conference freshman leader in rebounding and placed second to Victor Oladipo in field goal percentage (59.87% vs. 59.82%).

==== 2013 NBA draft ====
Prior to the Final Four, McGary stated that he would not enter the 2013 NBA draft, but a few days later said he had been caught off guard and would prefer to respond after he has time to reflect on his season. On April 9 before boarding the airplane to return from the NCAA Final Four, Beilein met with Burke, Hardaway, Robinson and McGary to direct them to seek the advice of the NBA advisory committee. The draft board has until April 15 to develop each individual report and the players have until April 28 to enter the draft. On April 12, ESPN journalist Myron Medcalf described McGary's likelihood of entering the draft as "borderline," noting that his NCAA tournament performance may have given him a sudden chance to be a lottery selection. Several sources regarded him as a likely first round draft choice in the NBA Draft, so there was much speculation about him entering his name into the draft. On April 18, he and Robinson held a joint press conference to announce that they would not enter the draft. This came after Burke and Hardaway entered the draft on the 14th and 17th, respectively.

=== Sophomore ===
==== Preseason ====
On April 30, ESPN's Eamonn Brennan named him a first team 2013-14 pre-offseason All-American selection. In June 2013, Sporting News' Mike DeCourcy named McGary the best center for the upcoming season. McGary declined an invitation to try out for the USA Basketball team that competed at the 2013 Summer Universiade, opting instead to attend the Nike Skills Academy for big men featuring Amar'e Stoudemire and Anthony Davis and the LeBron James Skills Academy.

On September 6, Sporting News named McGary to its preseason All-American first team (along with Doug McDermott, Marcus Smart, Jabari Parker and Andrew Wiggins), as well as the best overall player in the Big Ten Conference after he led Michigan to the championship game by averaging 14.3 points and 10.7 rebounds per game in the tournament. NBC Sports named him a second team selection. Later that month, McGary joined McDermott, Smart, Wiggins and Julius Randle as first team preseason All-Americans by USA Today Sports 2013-14 College Basketball Preview Magazine. However, USA Today sports staff later selected him as second team. Blue Ribbon College Basketball Yearbook named McGary a preseason second team All-American. Lindy's Sports selected McGary to the preseason All-Big Ten second team and named him the nation's second best power forward. Athlon Sports selected McGary to its preseason All-American second team and preseason All-Big Ten first team. CBS Sports selected McGary as a second team preseason All-American. Dick Vitale selected McGary to his All-Solid Gold preseason first team (along with McDermott, Smart, Russ Smith and Aaron Craft). On November 4, McGary was named first team preseason All-American by the Associated Press along with Mcdermott, Smart, Wiggins and Smith. McGary was on the 50-man Naismith Award and Wooden Award preseason watchlists.

In September, McGary experienced an unspecified lower back condition that impaired his basketball activity. He sat out the first exhibition game on October 29 against Concordia University. McGary was a preseason All-Big Ten selection in both the official media poll released by the Big Ten Conference and the unofficial media poll released by the Big Ten Network. He was also on the 15-man Oscar Robertson Trophy Preseason Watch List.

==== Regular season ====
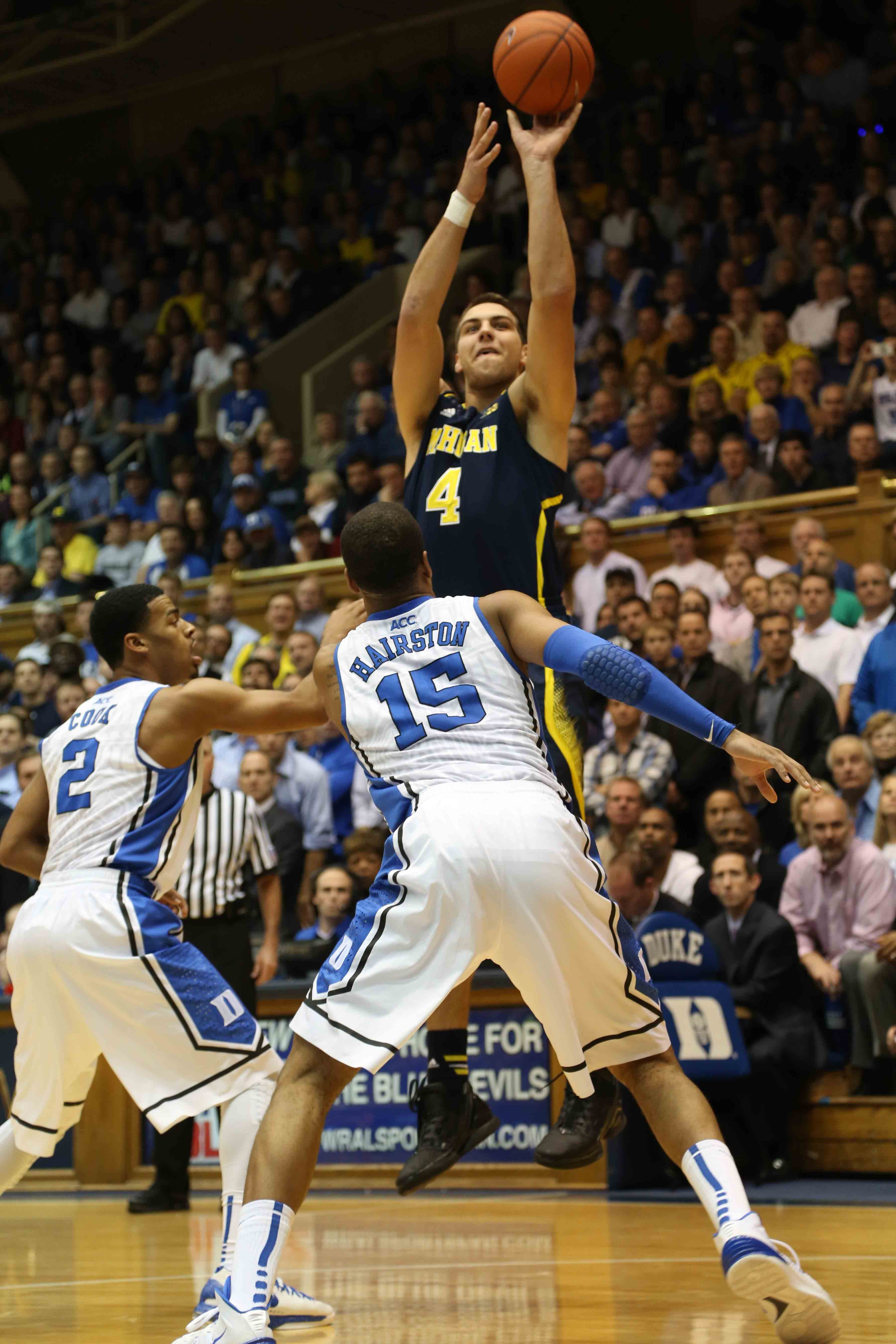
McGary takes a jump shot against Quinn Cook and Josh Hairston in the Duke-Michigan rivalry game.

McGary sat out the season opener on November 8 due to his back problems. By November 11, head coach Beilein stated that McGary had begun participating in limited full-speed workouts. After missing the preseason and first two regular season games, McGary returned to play against Iowa State on November 17 posting 9 points, 6 rebounds and 4 steals. McGary posted a 14-point and 12 rebound double-double in his third game, which was the November 22 Puerto Rico Tip-Off semifinal against Florida State. With leading scorer Stauskas sidelined with an injury, the November 29 contest against Coppin State was McGary's first start of the season. On December 3, McGary had 15 points and 14 rebounds against Duke. McGary tied his career high with 6 assists as Michigan defeated Houston Baptist by the 54 points on December 7. On December 21, McGary sat out against Stanford due to assorted ailments. On December 27, McGary announced that he would have back surgery. On January 3, the surgery date was announced as January 7. By March 15, he had progressed to running on hardcourt surfaces, after some time spent running on an underwater treadmill. He was nearing jumping activities. The 2013–14 team advanced to the elite eight round of the 2014 NCAA Division I men's basketball tournament before being eliminated by Kentucky on March 30. He ended his career with a 67.9% NCAA Tournament career field goal percentage, which is a school record (min 20 attempts).

== Professional career ==
=== 2014 NBA draft ===
Following the season, McGary, who had slipped from a projected 2013 first round selection to a projected 2014 second round selection, stated that he had to evaluate whether he was mentally and physically ready to pursue a professional career. Many in the press felt he should return to "rebuild his draft stock". Upon learning that he had tested positive for marijuana following the Sweet Sixteen victory over Tennessee and was facing a one-year suspension, McGary declared for the draft, following teammates Stauskas and Robinson who had declared ten days earlier. Of Michigan's prior 14 early NBA draft entrants, 10 were selected in the first round and 3 in the second. McGary was tested 18 days before the NCAA decided to reduce the automatic punishment for marijuana use to a half a season and his appeal for lenience was unsuccessful. During his two years with Michigan, the school enjoyed its winningest two-year stretch in school history marked by a total of 59 wins. McGary signed with sports agent Mark Bartelstein, the father of his teammate Josh Bartelstein (along with teammate Stauskas).

=== Oklahoma City Thunder (2014–2016) ===
McGary was drafted 21st overall by the Oklahoma City Thunder. With teammates Stauskas and Robinson also being drafted, it marked the first time Michigan had at least three draft picks since the 1990 NBA draft. With Burke and Hardaway having been drafted the year before, every player that started in the 2013 NCAA Men's Division I Basketball Championship Game was drafted either in the 2013 or 2014 NBA draft.

On July 5, 2014, McGary signed with the Thunder and joined them for the 2014 NBA Summer League. On October 8 during training camp, McGary fractured the second metatarsal of his left foot, causing him to be sidelined for an estimated six weeks. This occurred three weeks before the team's October 29 season opener and meant McGary was expected to miss the first 14 games of the season. After missing the first 14 games, he began to be a limited participant in practices. McGary debuted with the Thunder on December 14 with 4 rebounds and 3 points in seven minutes of play against the Phoenix Suns. Subsequently, McGary was sidelined for 2–3 weeks with periostitis (inflammation) in his left tibia. On February 8, in his third NBA game, McGary posted a double double with 19 points and 10 rebounds against the Los Angeles Clippers. He was one of the finalists for NBA Western Conference Rookie of the Month during March. On March 13, McGary made his first start against the Minnesota Timberwolves in place of an injured Serge Ibaka, scoring 12 points in 22 minutes. On March 16, McGary established a new career high by nabbing 11 rebounds in his first 6 minutes of play before going on to post a double double with 13 rebounds and 12 points in 17 minutes against Dallas Mavericks. In the April 15 season finale against the Minnesota Timberwolves, McGary posted a season-high 4 blocked shots in just 14 minutes of play. During his rookie and sophomore seasons, he had multiple assignments with Oklahoma City Blue, the Thunder's D-League affiliate.

On October 16, 2015, McGary suffered a loose ball collision with Matt Barnes of the Memphis Grizzlies that resulted in concussion-like symptoms. On October 21, the Thunder exercised their third-year team option on McGary's rookie scale contract, extending the contract through the 2016–17 season. On October 26, he was cleared for the October 28 season opener. However, McGary did not appear in the game. He went on to play limited minutes in 20 games before leaving the team prior to the end of the season for "personal reasons".

On July 8, 2016, McGary was suspended for five games by the NBA for a failed drug test. Two months later, he was suspended an additional 10 games for non-compliance with the league's drug policy, bringing the number of regular season games he is suspended without pay for to 15. On October 24, 2016, following preseason, McGary was waived by the Thunder.

== Post-basketball career ==
By 2017, McGary returned to bowling, a sport of his youth and that his mother competed at for 29 years, but still felt more basketball might be in his future.

== NBA career statistics ==
Legend
GP	Games played	GS	Games started	MPG	Minutes per game
FG%	Field goal percentage	3P%	3-point field goal percentage	FT%	Free throw percentage
RPG	Rebounds per game	APG	Assists per game	SPG	Steals per game
BPG	Blocks per game	PPG	Points per game	**Bold**	Career high

=== Regular season ===
Year	Team	GP	GS	MPG	FG%	3P%	FT%	RPG	APG	SPG	BPG	PPG
2014–15	Oklahoma City	**32**	**2**	**15.2**	**.533**	.000	**.625**	**5.2**	**.4**	**.5**	**.5**	**6.3**
2015–16	Oklahoma City	20	0	3.6	.478	.000	.400	.9	.2	.1	.1	1.3
Career		52	2	10.7	.527	.000	.580	3.5	.3	.3	.3	4.4

== Personal life ==
McGary's father is a Chesterton High School alumnus and his mother worked there as the school treasurer. McGary is an avid skateboarder, with a set of skateboard ramps built by his father in his backyard.

== See also ==
- List of people banned or suspended by the NBA
