= Elle Leonard =

American athlete & entrepreneur (born 1992)

- Born: Elizabeth Anne Bielfeldt; January 15, 1992 (age 34); Peoria, Illinois, United States
- Other name: Elle Bielfeldt
- Education: Bachelor's degree, 2014
- Alma mater: University of Illinois Urbana-Champaign
- Occupation: Entrepreneur
- Years active: 2018–present
- Spouse: Meyers Leonard
- Children: 2

Instagram information
- Page: elleleonard
- Followers: 213 thousand

TikTok information
- Page: elleleonardofficial
- Followers: 1.4 million
- Last updated: May 24, 2026

Elizabeth Anne "Elle" Leonard (/ˈɛliː/; née Bielfeldt; born January 15, 1992) is an American entrepreneur and former athlete. At Peoria Notre Dame High School, she excelled in basketball and volleyball. In basketball, she was a 5th team all-state selection who had several all-star game appearances. She did not continue athletics at University of Illinois Urbana-Champaign, where she met her husband who is National Basketball Association veteran Meyers Leonard. She is from the Central Illinois Bielfeldt family, along with her brother Max Bielfeldt. She started her own food brand that has expanded to clothing.

== Background and early life ==
Leonard is the oldest of four children of David and Julie Bielfeldt. Leonard's parents and both sets of grandparents are Illinois alumni. Grandfather Gary Bielfeldt played for Illinois Fighting Illini football in the 1950s, and he later worked in the financial sector. Grandmother Carlotta Bielfeldt was homecoming queen at Illinois. Constructed between the October 21, 1994, groundbreaking and the October 4, 1996, dedication, the Bielfeldt Athletic Administration Building is a $7.2 million ($14.78 million in 2025), 43,000-square-foot (3995 m^{2}) building endowed by Gary and Carlotta Bielfeldt.

Leonard began playing competitive basketball in third grade in the Peoria Girls Sports League and was a student at Peoria Academy until eighth grade. In the summer of 2005, she regularly practiced late into the night to develop her jump shot.

== High school ==
When she arrived at Peoria Notre Dame High School in Fall 2006 she hoped to join the freshman basketball team but was almost immediately thrust into varsity competition. She started contributing very quickly. As a sophomore she averaged 11.8 points. During her 2008–09 junior season she (listed at 5 ft 11 in (1.80 m)) earned press along with her younger (sophomore) brother, Max Bielfeldt (listed at 6 ft 6 in (1.98 m)), for being one of the area's interesting sibling basketball performers. That year she averaged 12.3 points. Bielfeldt was listed as a center. On December 15, 2009, she scored 19 points, including her 1000th career point, in a victory against crosstown rival Peoria High School. On January 14, 2010, Leonard scored 25 points against LaSalle-Peru High School. During her senior season, the team started with a 9–8 record before winning 11 games in a row before losing the rematch against Peoria High School on February 2, 2010.

In the 2010 Class 3A/4A Illinois Basketball Coaches Association Girls All-Star Game she tallied 4 points and 7 rebounds. Leonard was invited to participate in a pair of 2010 All-star games that pitted a Peoria, Illinois city team against a suburban team: Kiwanis Senior Boys and Girls Basketball Invitational, and the Independent Sports Club of Central Illinois Senior All-Star Classic. She was a 2010 Peoria Journal Star Large School second team (all-area) All-star. She was an Illinois Basketball Services large school all-state fifth team selection.

Her younger brother, Max, was highly touted for basketball, but Elle claims that she could beat him at one-on-one until he could dunk. She opted to attend University of Illinois Urbana-Champaign purely as a student rather than continue her basketball career at a smaller school as a scholarship athlete. In the March 30, 2010, announcement that the Peoria Times-Observer would cease operations on April 28, 2010, both Elle and Max Bielfeldt were thanked for having lives that made for great content.

As a junior middle hitter, she had 155 blocks, and 131 kills for the volleyball team. As a senior, she had 132 kills, 108 blocks, and 27 aces. Her younger (high school class of 2014) sister, Matti (listed at 6 ft 1 in (1.85 m)), excelled in volleyball (179 kills, 87 digs, 79 blocks and 30 aces as a senior) and eventually joined the University of Illinois team.

== Career ==
In 2018, Leonard created Level Foods because of her husband's special dietary needs, and is chief executive officer. After three years of operating solely as a food company, the brand marketed merchandise and then subsequently expanded to female sportswear.

== Personal life ==
On May 25, 2014, Leonard accepted Meyers' engagement proposal. They were married at the beginning of August 2015. The couple have two sons. Leonard can be seen keeping her basketball skills sharp on social media.

== Philanthropy ==
The Leonards donated $20,000 to the United States Armed Forces program for the American Red Cross. They donated $500,000 to the Illinois Athletic Department toward the renovation of the site of their first date, the Ubben Basketball Complex.
