= Meyers Leonard =

American basketball player (born 1992)

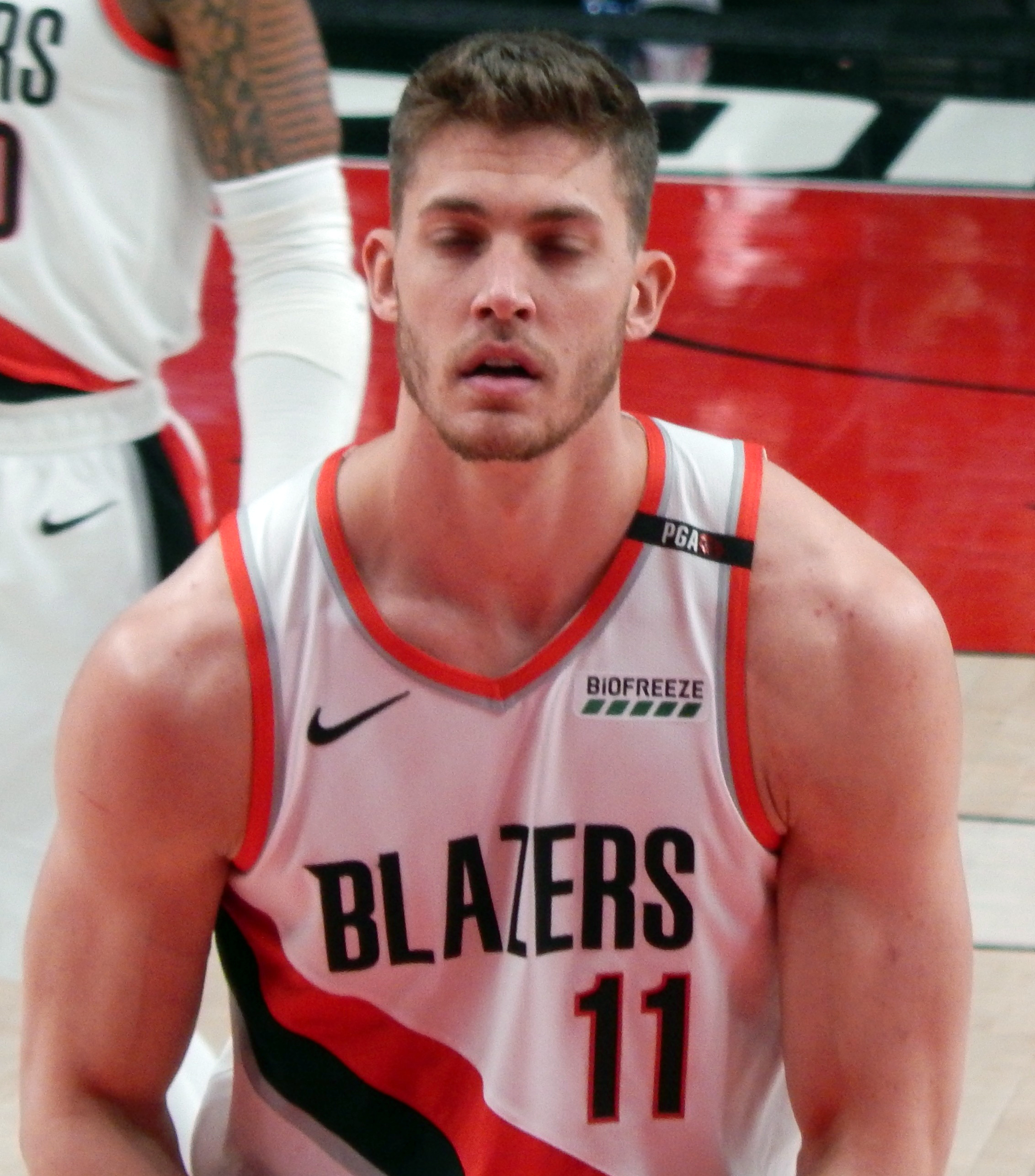
- Leonard with the Portland Trail Blazers in 2019

Personal information
- Born: February 27, 1992 (age 34) Woodbridge, Virginia, U.S.
- Listed height: 7 ft 0 in (2.13 m)
- Listed weight: 260 lb (118 kg)

Career information
- High school: Robinson (Robinson, Illinois)
- College: Illinois (2010–2012)
- NBA draft: 2012: 1st round, 11th overall pick
- Drafted by: Portland Trail Blazers
- Playing career: 2012–2023
- Position: Center / power forward
- Number: 11, 0, 3

Career history
- 2012–2019: Portland Trail Blazers
- 2019–2021: Miami Heat
- 2023: Milwaukee Bucks
- Stats at NBA.com
- Stats at Basketball Reference

Meyers Patrick Leonard (born February 27, 1992) is an American former professional basketball player. He played college basketball for the Illinois Fighting Illini before being selected by the Portland Trail Blazers with the 11th overall pick in the 2012 NBA draft. After spending his first seven seasons with the Trail Blazers, he was traded to the Miami Heat in the 2019 off-season. He reached the NBA Finals with the Heat in 2020. No NBA player who is at least 7 ft 0 in (2.13 m) has a career three point shot field goal percentage of 40%, but Leonard is one of the few that has one over 39%.

== Early life ==
Leonard, born in Woodbridge, Virginia, grew up in Robinson, Illinois, a small town in southeastern Illinois. When he was six years old, his father James, a golf pro, was killed in a freak bicycle accident. His mother Tracie, once an athlete who would run upwards of 10 miles a day, had been largely housebound since her husband's death, due to an old horseback injury and subsequent disc surgery that left her with crippling pain.

When he was in second grade, the young Leonard gained a surrogate family. Brian Siler, an insurance agent in Robinson who had a son of the same age, was aware of Leonard's family situation, and eventually became a father figure. Leonard regularly attended the Silers' church and went on family vacations. According to ESPN.com writer Dana O'Neil:

"Looking to shoehorn the relationship into a convenient box, outsiders have called this Meyers' version of The Blind Side, but the comparison is inaccurate. The book and subsequent movie tell the story of Michael Oher, a boy who was homeless and didn't have much of a family life. Meyers Leonard has a family. It has not abandoned him. On the contrary, Tracie loves her son, loves him so much that she was willing to accept help."

== High school career ==
Leonard entered high school as a guard, but was converted to center after a six-inch (15 cm) growth spurt between his freshman and sophomore years. O'Neil called him "something of a basketball anomaly", adding that Leonard "gained all that height without losing his coordination or his fast-twitch muscles."

In high school, Leonard was named a member of the 2010 Illinois All-State Team as selected by the Associated Press, Chicago Tribune, Chicago Sun-Times, News-Gazette, and the Illinois Basketball Coaches Association. Leonard led Robinson High School to the IHSA class 2A state championship before choosing to play collegiate basketball at the University of Illinois.

College recruiting
Name	Hometown	School	Height	Weight	Commit date
Meyers Leonard; C	Robinson, IL	Robinson High School	7 ft 0 in (2.13 m)	240 lb (110 kg)	Jul 29, 2008
Meyers Leonard; C	Recruit ratings: Scout: Rivals: (95)				
Overall recruit ranking: Scout: 6 (C) Rivals: 6 (C) ESPN: 4 (C)
Note: In many cases, Scout, Rivals, 247Sports, On3, and ESPN may conflict in their listings of height and weight.; In these cases, the average was taken. ESPN grades are on a 100-point scale.; Sources: "Illinois Commit List for 2010". Rivals.; "Men's Basketball Recruiting". Scout.; "ESPN – Illinois Fighting Illini Basketball Recruiting 2010". ESPN.; "Scout.com Team Recruiting Rankings". Scout.; "2010 Team Ranking". Rivals.

== College career ==
=== Illinois (2010–2012) ===
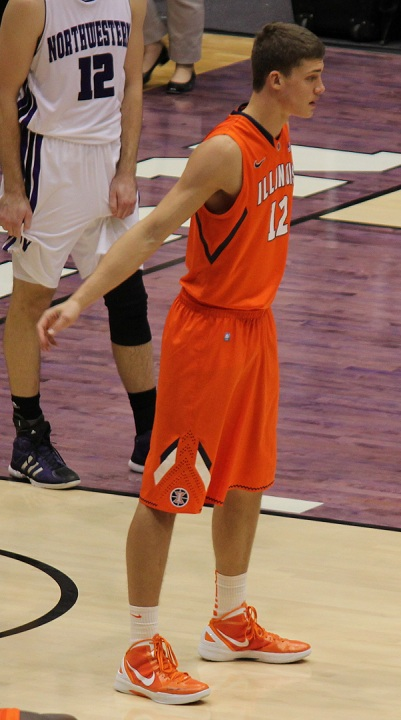
Leonard playing for Illinois

As a freshman at the University of Illinois at Urbana–Champaign in 2010–11, Leonard averaged 2.1 points and 1.2 rebounds per game in 8.2 minutes per game for the Fighting Illini. Following the season he was invited to the June 17–24, 2011, 17-man tryouts for the 12-man FIBA Under-19 World Championship team by USA Basketball. Leonard was one of 12 selected players that competed as Team USA in the 2011 FIBA U19 World Championships in Latvia from June 30 – July 10, 2011, and placed fifth in the competition.

As a sophomore in 2011–12, Leonard averaged 13.6 points and 8.2 rebounds per game. Leonard was named Big Ten Co-Player of the Week on December 5, 2011, after averaging 16.5 points and 6.0 rebounds per game in two Illinois victories. Leonard was also named Big Ten Player of the Week on December 26, 2011, after averaging 16.5 points and 14.5 rebounds per game in two games. Following the season, Leonard was named Honorable Mention All Big-10. He then entered the NBA draft.

Leonard hosted Max Bielfeldt during his February 26 and 27, 2011 official visit and met Max's sister Elle for the first time. Elle was friends with Mike Davis' girlfriend, and after Illinois' 2010–11 basketball season, their relationship developed. Their first date was five hours long at the University of Illinois gym. The pair spent two hours of shooting basketball and then three hours of talking, since she refused a dinner date.

== Professional career ==
=== Portland Trail Blazers (2012–2019) ===
Leonard was drafted with the 11th overall pick by the Portland Trail Blazers in the 2012 NBA draft. On July 13 he signed his rookie-scale contract with the Trail Blazers. On October 31, 2012, Leonard made his NBA debut, logging 23 minutes and scoring four points against the Los Angeles Lakers. He made his first career start on November 21, 2012, against the Phoenix Suns, finishing with 12 points and 5 rebounds. On March 30, 2013, he had a season-best game with 22 points and 10 rebounds in a loss to the Golden State Warriors.

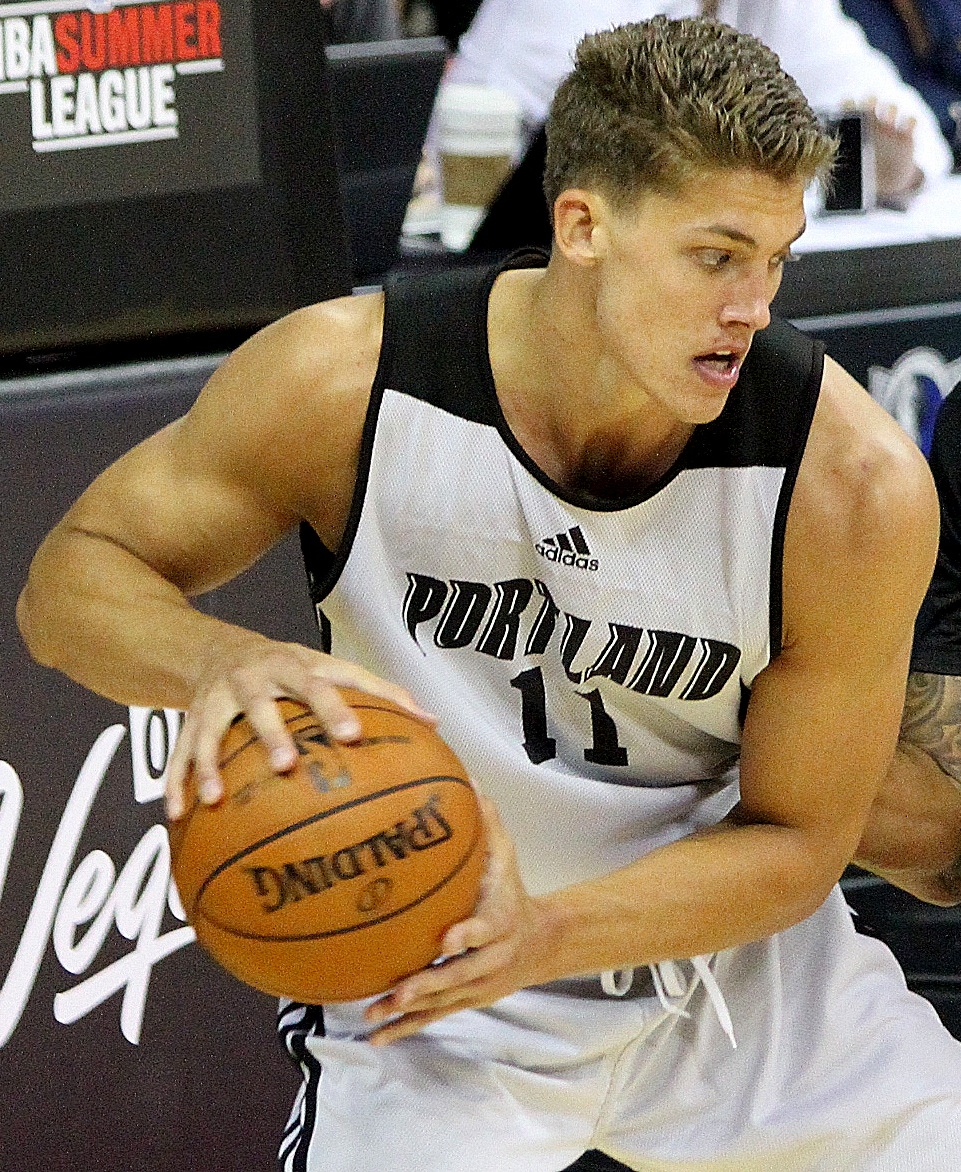
Leonard with the Portland Trail Blazers in 2013

Leonard's numbers dipped from his rookie to sophomore season, falling behind fellow second-year big man Joel Freeland as the primary backup to starter Robin Lopez. He saw action in 29 fewer games in 2013–14, with his minutes and points per game cut in half, as the Blazers transformed from a lottery team to a playoff contender. On January 2, 2014, he had a season-best game with 8 points and 10 rebounds in a 134–104 win over the Charlotte Bobcats.

In 2014–15, Leonard played only 13 total minutes in Portland's first 9 games as he was stuck in the big-man rotation behind Lopez, Freeland and Chris Kaman. On November 15, 2014, with LaMarcus Aldridge scratched with an upper respiratory illness against the Brooklyn Nets, Leonard picked up the start at power forward, playing 29 minutes. With his first major minutes at the power forward spot, he performed admirably, tallying 12 rebounds and hitting a three-pointer. He went on to pick up DNPs in 11 of the next 12 games. But when Lopez broke his hand going up for a rebound against the San Antonio Spurs on December 15, Leonard got another chance to show that he deserved time on the court. His improvement was incremental, but noticeable, over the following seven weeks. His play while Lopez was out earned him time to prove himself. He only saw six DNPs after the turn of the year, and grew in confidence despite limited minutes. At the season's end, Leonard had produced a remarkable 50/40/90 season, shooting 51% from the field, 42% from three-point range, and 93% from the free throw line. In the penultimate game of the regular season on April 13, he scored a career-high 24 points in a loss to the Oklahoma City Thunder. He went on to record a playoff-best game with 13 points and 13 rebounds in a win over the Memphis Grizzlies in game 4 of Portland's first-round series. The Blazers lost the series 4–1.

On December 1, 2015, Leonard scored a season-high 23 points in a loss to the Dallas Mavericks. On March 24, 2016, he was ruled out for the rest of the season after injuring his left shoulder, requiring surgery.

On July 10, 2016, Leonard re-signed with the Trail Blazers on a four-year, $41 million contract. On October 8, 2016, he was cleared for all practice activities, six months after undergoing surgery on his left shoulder. On December 23, 2016, he scored a season-high 16 points off the bench in a 110–90 loss to the San Antonio Spurs.

On May 20, 2019, in game 4 of the Western Conference Finals, Leonard recorded a career-high 30 points and 12 rebounds in a 119–117 overtime loss to the Golden State Warriors.

=== Miami Heat (2019–2021) ===
On July 6, 2019, Leonard was traded to the Miami Heat in a four-team trade. The Heat reached the 2020 NBA Finals, but lost the series in 6 games to the Los Angeles Lakers. Leonard started two games in the Finals when Bam Adebayo was injured.

On November 22, 2020, the Miami Heat announced that they had re-signed with Leonard. On February 2, 2021, it was reported that Leonard had undergone shoulder surgery and would miss the remainder of 2020–21 season.

On March 9, 2021, the Heat announced that Leonard would be suspended indefinitely while the NBA conducted an investigation into his use of an antisemitic slur during a Twitch video game livestream session. The NBA suspended him for one week and fined him $50,000.

On March 17, 2021, Leonard was traded to the Oklahoma City Thunder with a 2027 second-round pick for Trevor Ariza. The Thunder stated that Leonard would not be joining the team or participating in any basketball activities and that they had traded for him as a salary filler. Leonard was released on March 25.

In April 2021, he underwent an ankle surgery. Leonard was soon found to have nerve damage within the bottom half of his right leg.

On January 13, 2023, the Los Angeles Lakers hosted Leonard for a workout, which was the first publicized activity of his attempted NBA comeback after his antisemitism controversy.

=== Milwaukee Bucks (2023) ===
On February 22, 2023, Leonard signed a 10-day contract with the Milwaukee Bucks. On March 4, he signed a second 10-day contract with the Bucks. On March 14, Leonard signed a contract to stay on the team for the rest of the season.

On March 2, 2025, Leonard announced his retirement from professional basketball.

=== Legacy ===
Leonard has at times been regarded as having the highest career three point shot field goal percentage among players listed at 7 ft 0 in (2.13 m) or taller. While Dirk Nowitzki has the highest number of made three point shots by a player listed at 7 ft 0 in (2.13 m) or taller with 1,982 made, Nowitzki's career percentage is only 38%. Meanwhile, Leonard had a career percentage over 39%, which was described as the highest by players officially listed at 7 feet (2.13 m).

== Career statistics ==
Legend
GP	Games played	GS	Games started	MPG	Minutes per game
FG%	Field goal percentage	3P%	3-point field goal percentage	FT%	Free throw percentage
RPG	Rebounds per game	APG	Assists per game	SPG	Steals per game
BPG	Blocks per game	PPG	Points per game	**Bold**	Career high

=== NBA ===
==== Regular season ====
Year	Team	GP	GS	MPG	FG%	3P%	FT%	RPG	APG	SPG	BPG	PPG
2012–13	Portland	69	9	17.5	.545	.429	.809	3.7	.5	.2	**.6**	5.5
2013–14	Portland	40	0	8.9	.451	.000	.762	2.8	.5	.2	.1	2.5
2014–15	Portland	55	7	15.4	.510	.420	**.938**	4.5	.6	.2	.3	5.9
2015–16	Portland	61	10	**21.9**	.448	.377	.761	**5.1**	**1.5**	.1	.3	**8.4**
2016–17	Portland	**74**	12	16.5	.386	.347	.875	3.2	1.0	.2	.4	5.4
2017–18	Portland	33	2	7.7	**.590**	.423	.818	2.1	.5	.2	.0	3.4
2018–19	Portland	61	2	14.4	.545	**.450**	.843	3.8	1.2	.2	.1	5.9
2019–20	Miami	51	**49**	20.3	.509	.414	.643	5.1	1.1	**.3**	.3	6.1
2020–21	Miami	3	2	9.7	.429	.429	.500	2.3	.7	.0	.0	3.3
2022–23	Milwaukee	9	2	12.7	.483	.389	.889	3.8	.1	.2	.0	4.8
Career		456	95	15.9	.482	.390	.812	3.9	.9	.2	.3	5.6

==== Playoffs ====
Year	Team	GP	GS	MPG	FG%	3P%	FT%	RPG	APG	SPG	BPG	PPG
2014	Portland	4	0	2.3	.000	—	—	.5	.0	.0	.0	.0
2015	Portland	5	0	**21.2**	.667	**.769**	.500	**6.6**	1.0	**.4**	**.4**	**7.8**
2017	Portland	3	1	10.3	.200	.000	—	2.7	.3	.0	.0	.7
2018	Portland	2	0	4.0	**1.000**	—	—	2.0	.0	.0	.0	4.0
2019	Portland	**11**	**2**	15.5	.523	.424	.333	3.6	**1.1**	.2	.1	7.7
2020	Miami	3	**2**	10.3	.625	.500	**1.000**	.3	1.0	.3	.0	4.7
2023	Milwaukee	2	0	2.6	.000	—	—	.5	.0	.0	.0	.0
Career		30	5	12.0	.547	.481	.462	3.0	.7	.2	.1	4.9

=== College ===
Year	Team	GP	GS	MPG	FG%	3P%	FT%	RPG	APG	SPG	BPG	PPG
2010–11	Illinois	**33**	1	8.2	.483	.000	.706	1.2	.2	.2	.4	2.1
2011–12	Illinois	32	**29**	**31.8**	**.584**	**.091**	**.732**	**8.2**	**1.3**	**.5**	**1.9**	**13.6**
Career		65	30	19.8	.567	.083	.729	4.7	.7	.3	1.1	7.7

== Personal life ==
Leonard has two older brothers; Christian Juracich, who died in 2020 and Bailey Leonard, a former U.S. Marine who has served in Afghanistan. On May 25, 2014, he proposed marriage to Elle, his long-time girlfriend, who accepted. They were married at the beginning of August 2015. The Leonards founded a sports bar company together called Level Foods. On June 7, 2022, their son Liam Walter Leonard was born. Their second son, Jackson James Leonard was born May 14, 2025.

In April 2019, Leonard invested in FaZe Clan as a content creator. The Leonards have donated $500,000 to the Illinois Athletic Department toward the renovation of the site of their first date, the Ubben Basketball Complex.

=== Antisemitic slur controversy ===
On March 9, 2021, Leonard received criticism for using the antisemitic slur "kike" during a Twitch stream while playing Call of Duty: Warzone. The Heat announced the same day that they were reviewing the matter and that Leonard would be "away from the team indefinitely." The eSports organization FaZe Clan cut ties with him later that day, although he remained an investor. He later apologized for using the slur, stating that he did not know what it meant.
