= Sixth man =

Non-starter in basketball that frequently substitutes

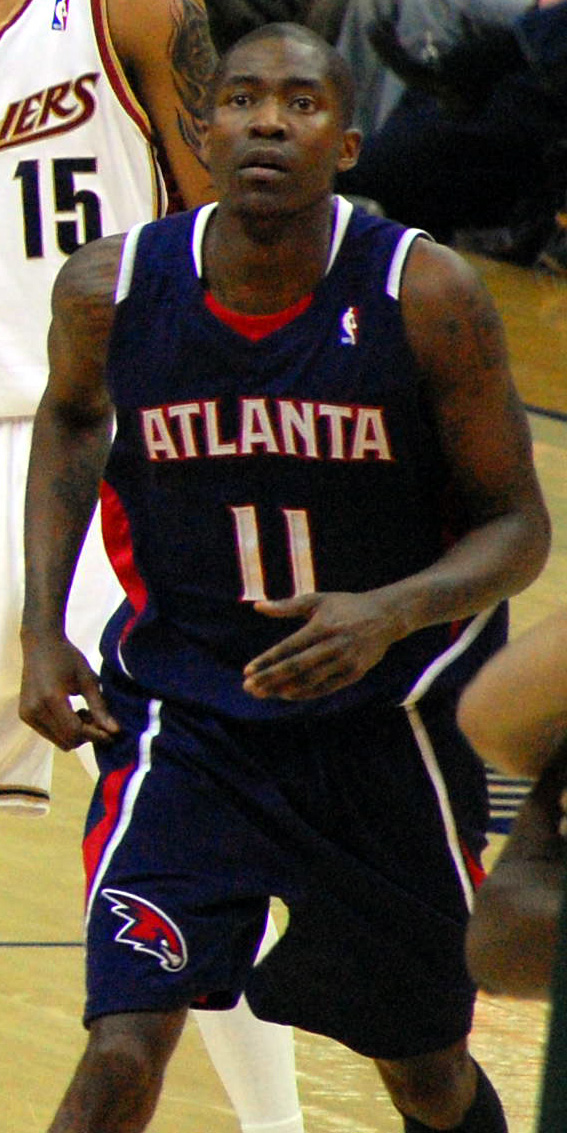
Jamal Crawford was named NBA Sixth Man of the Year in 2010, 2014, and 2016 while playing for the Atlanta Hawks and Los Angeles Clippers (twice) respectively.

The sixth man in basketball is a player who is not a starter but comes off the bench much more often than other reserves, often being the first player to be substituted in, and the first to be used against the other team's substitutes. The sixth man often plays minutes equal to or exceeding some of the starters and posts similar statistics. He is often a player who can play multiple positions, hence his utility in substituting often. For example, Kevin McHale, a famous sixth man who played for the Boston Celtics in the 1980s, variably played center and power forward. The presence of a good sixth man is often a sign of team excellence. It usually means that a team has excellent depth, as the sixth man is usually more than talented enough to start for most teams.

A common strategy is to place a good scorer as a sixth man when the starting lineup already has enough scorers. In this case, the sixth man will enter the game without the team suffering a drop-off in scoring. This was used during the Chicago Bulls' championship runs with forward Toni Kukoč and more recently with Manu Ginóbili of the San Antonio Spurs, Leandro Barbosa during his tenure with the Phoenix Suns, Jason Terry during his time with the Dallas Mavericks, James Harden during his time with the Oklahoma City Thunder, and Jamal Crawford with the Los Angeles Clippers. A different strategy is to wait for the game to develop, thus letting the sixth man read the opponent's weak spots and take advantage of them once he steps in. Theo Papaloukas brought this tactic to another level both for CSKA and Olympiacos, as well as the Greece men's national basketball team.

Legendary Boston Celtics coach Red Auerbach has been credited with creating the sixth man. He first used guard Frank Ramsey, who played behind the Hall-of-Fame duo of Bob Cousy and Bill Sharman, in the role during the early part of the Celtics' dynasty years. Though Ramsey was one of the Celtics' best players, he felt more comfortable coming off the bench and Auerbach wanted his best players fresh and in the lineup at the end of close games. The most famous sixth man, however, was teammate John Havlicek, who succeeded Ramsey and revolutionized the role during his 16-year career. By 1965, Billy Cunningham had picked up the role on the rival Sixers.

== See also ==
- 12th Man (football)
- NBA Sixth Man of the Year Award
- WNBA Sixth Player of the Year Award
