= Elizabeth Cohen (disambiguation) =

Elizabeth Cohen is an American journalist. Other people with this name include:

- Elizabeth Cohen (engineer), American acoustical engineer
- Elizabeth D. A. Cohen (1820–1921), American physician in Louisiana
- Elizabeth F. Cohen (born 1973), American political scientist
- Shaughnessy Cohen (born Elizabeth Shaughnessy Murray, 1948–1998), Canadian politician
- Betty Comden (born Basya Cohen; 1917–2006), American dramatist, screenwriter, librettist, and songwriter

== See also ==
- Ruby and Elizabeth Cohen Woodlands, in Connecticut, United States
