= Joe Comartin =

Canadian lawyer and politician

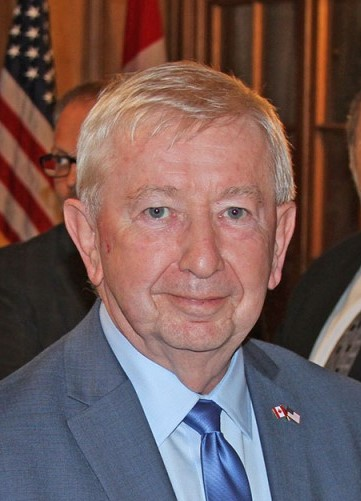
- Comartin in 2019

Deputy Speaker of the House of Commons Chairman of Committees of the Whole
- In office September 17, 2012 – December 4, 2015
- Monarch: Elizabeth II
- Governor General: David Johnston
- Prime Minister: Stephen Harper
- Speaker: Andrew Scheer
- Preceded by: Denise Savoie
- Succeeded by: Bruce Stanton

Opposition House Leader
- In office October 13, 2011 – April 19, 2012
- Leader: Thomas Mulcair
- Preceded by: Thomas Mulcair
- Succeeded by: Nathan Cullen

Member of Parliament for Windsor—Tecumseh (Windsor—St. Clair; 2000–2004)
- In office November 27, 2000 – October 19, 2015
- Preceded by: Rick Limoges
- Succeeded by: Cheryl Hardcastle

Personal details
- Born: Joseph John Comartin; December 26, 1947 (age 78) Stoney Point, Ontario, Canada
- Party: New Democratic
- Spouse: Maureen Granger
- Children: 3
- Profession: Lawyer, Managing Director

Joseph John Comartin (born December 26, 1947) is a retired Canadian lawyer, politician and diplomat. He represented the riding of Windsor—Tecumseh as its Member of Parliament (MP) from 2000 to 2015. A member of the New Democratic Party (NDP), he ran for its leadership in 2003. He called for a return to social democratic policies after the party's drift to the centre during the 1990s, and voiced concerns regarding American influence over Canada's economy and foreign policy. After serving in a variety of leadership roles, he retired from parliament in 2015. From 2018 to 2022 he served as the Consul General of Canada in Detroit, representing Canada in Indiana, Kentucky, Michigan, and Ohio.

== Early life and legal career ==
Joseph John "Joe" Comartin was born on December 26, 1947, in Stoney Point, Ontario, a small Franco-Ontarian community. He was the seventh and youngest child of Emery and Loretto (née Quirk) Comartin. His older siblings were Lucille, Agnes, Rosemary, Alice, Kathleen, and Edward. Emery was a French American born in North Dakota. Emery wandered the Midwestern United States during the Great Depression, eventually settling in Detroit after getting a job there as an autoworker. Loretto was an Irish Canadian from London, Ontario who moved to Detroit to care for her sick aunt. The two met through Detroit's Irish American community and married. Emery continued to work in Detroit, but the family also purchased a plot of land to farm in Stoney Point.

Emery died of stomach cancer when Joe was a year old and when Loretto was pregnant with an eighth child, who was named Emery after his father. Following the senior Emery's death, Loretto began teaching at an elementary school to supplement meager social assistance, financial support from family, and charity from the local community. She later remarried to Adelard Gagnon, a car salesman from Belle River, Ontario.

Comartin developed an early love for reading as a child, and he often read while in the branches of an apple tree. During his education he often had to work two or three jobs at a time to help support his family, with his first job being at a grocery store in Belle River. Comartin attended F.J. Brennan Catholic High School in Windsor, Ontario. At his mother's urging Comartin originally intended to become a priest, but at 16 he decided that he did not want to be celibate. Instead, he decided he wanted to become a lawyer, believing it to be a similar form of public service. While at Brennan, Comartin was elected the eleventh grade male representative on the student council. He was appointed as the male representative on the school's awards committee after the twelfth grade male representative proved unable to fill the role. The twelfth grade female representative was Comartin's future wife, Maureen Granger. Granger was already in a relationship at the time, and she and Comartin did not begin dating until a few years later. Comartin was elected student president in his final year at Brennan.

Following his high school graduation Comartin attended the University of Windsor, where he completed an undergraduate in political science in 1968, and law school in 1971. Unlike most of his older siblings, Comartin was able to attend university because of the creation of the Canada Student Loan Program. While at university Comartin was an engaged student activist; he attended a student strike where he briefly met then-Member of Provincial Parliament Hugh Peacock, and was a founding member of the Windsor chapter of the Canadian Environmental Law Association.

Two years after completing law school, Comartin established a private legal practice in Windsor. During this time, he specialised in civil litigation and representing low-income women in family law cases. In the late 1970s, Comartin sued brake manufacturer Bendix on behalf of widow Lucie Dunn to have her husband's death by mesothelioma recognised as a compensable injury.

In 1984, Comartin left his private legal practice to become a lawyer for the Windsor branch of the Canadian Auto Workers (CAW) and the managing director of its legal services.

== Political activism ==
The Comartin family had traditionally supported the Liberal Party, especially prominent local member Paul Martin Sr. At the encouragement of his sister, Comartin joined the Liberal Party and campaigned for her friend Mark MacGuigan in the 1968 Canadian federal election, in which Prime Minister Pierre Trudeau was elected for the first time. Despite his initial support, Comartin quickly grew to dislike Trudeau for his arrogance, and he switched parties to the NDP the next year after concluding they better aligned with his values. Comartin went on to become heavily involved with the regional riding associations of the NDP and Ontario New Democratic Party (ONDP).

In 1981, Comartin was appointed co-chair of the Mayor's Committee on Services for the Unemployed by Bert Weeks.

Following Weeks' retirement, Comartin worked as the campaign manager for Elizabeth Kishkon's successful bid to succeed him in the 1982 Windsor municipal election. Comartin also campaigned for city alderman Howard McCurdy's successful bid to be elected MP for Windsor—Walkerville in the 1984 Canadian federal election. After McCurdy's election, there was a controversy over whether his replacement as city alderman would be appointed or if a by-election would be held. Comartin was considered a contender to replace McCurdy, but ultimately former mayor Michael J. Patrick was appointed instead. Comartin was the ONDP campaign manager for Windsor—Walkerville in 1985 and 1987, working on behalf of unsuccessful candidates Gary Parent and Donna Champagne.

While otherwise a supporter, Comartin was highly critical of Leader of the NDP Ed Broadbent's conduct in the 1988 Canadian federal election. Comartin believed that Broadbent had unwisely focused on nationwide campaigning rather than targeting winnable ridings. Comartin also believed that Broadbent had failed to capitalise on the NDP's traditionally protectionist trade policy amidst widespread opposition to the Canada-United States Free Trade Agreement, which the Liberals had made a major campaign issue. Local NDP MPs Howard McCurdy and Steven Langdon both agreed with Comartin's assessment. Broadbent chose to resign as Leader shortly after the election, and both McCurdy and Langdon ran to replace him in the 1989 New Democratic Party leadership election. McCurdy and Langdon's rivalry as leadership candidates was exacerbated by the fact that they came from neighbouring ridings and had to compete for support in their home county. Comartin supported McCurdy, who made a surprisingly poor showing of fifth place on the first ballot of the leadership convention. On the second ballot, McCurdy withdrew and endorsed Langdon. Following McCurdy's withdrawal Comartin supported Langdon, even after McCurdy changed his endorsement to Audrey McLaughlin, the eventual winner, on the third ballot.

In the lead-up to the 1990 Ontario general election, Donna Champagne surprisingly chose not to run again. Champagne endorsed the relatively unknown Wayne Lessard, who became the ONDP nominee in Windsor—Walkerville in her stead. Comartin campaigned for Lessard, but was out of the country for part of the election season. Before leaving the country, Comartin predicted that the ONDP would do about as well as it had in the previous election, and expected the party to win about 17 seats in the Legislative Assembly. After returning to Canada, Comartin found that support for the party had surged, and the ONDP went on to form government for the first time in Ontarian history. Leader of the ONDP Bob Rae became Premier of Ontario. In Windsor—Walkerville, Lessard defeated Liberal incumbent Mike Ray.

Comartin declined to run for mayor in the 1991 Windsor municipal election.

In 1992, Prime Minister Brian Mulroney made his second attempt at constitutional reform, known as the Charlottetown Accord. Approval of the Accord was subject to a nationwide referendum, with Canada's three major parties, the Progressive Conservatives, the Liberals, and the New Democrats all supporting its ratification. Comartin was made campaign manager for the 'Yes' campaign in Windsor, and directed all three parties' riding associations in the area. Despite massive institutional support, Windsor voted against ratifying the Accord by a nearly two-to-one margin.

Comartin did a great deal of lobbying on behalf of Windsor's unions to convince the Rae Government to build Ontario's first casino in Windsor. Comartin's efforts were supported by Dave Cooke, a fellow Windsorite and a senior member of Rae's cabinet. The lobbying was a success, resulting in the eventual construction of Caesars Windsor. Comartin was appointed to the Ontario Casino Corporation (OCC) board of directors in 1993.

Rae's ONDP government was defeated in a landslide in the 1995 Ontario general election by the Progressive Conservatives, led by Mike Harris. Shortly after being elected, the Harris Government removed Comartin from his position on the board of the OCC before his term had expired, which was widely seen as politically motivated. The removal caused an uproar in Windsor, as it deprived the city of any representation on the board of the OCC despite having (at the time) the only casino in the province.

== Political career ==
Having grown up without a father and being especially aware of the strain that put on a family, Comartin had delayed any political aspirations until after his children were grown. Comartin ran for MP in his home riding of Windsor—St. Clair in the 1997 Canadian federal election. Comartin campaigned on job creation and expanding healthcare coverage against Liberal incumbent Shaughnessy Cohen, who was considered vulnerable after a personal finance scandal in which she defaulted on her debt. Other notable candidates included Mayor of Tecumseh Harold Downs for the Reform Party, and national party treasurer Bruck Easton for the Progressive Conservatives. Despite the scandal and frequent appearances on his behalf by Leader of the NDP Alexa McDonough, Comartin was defeated, placing second to Cohen. The 1997 election was also marred by personal tragedy; Comartin's mother died in the first week of the campaign, with her second husband having predeceased her seven years earlier, and in the week following the campaign, Comartin's youngest son Adam was in a motorcycle accident which left his right arm permanently paralyzed.

After Cohen's sudden death in office, Comartin ran in the 1999 by-election to replace her. Comartin's main opponent was city councillor Rick Limoges, who defeated Cohen's widower, Jerry Cohen, for the Liberal nomination. While the by-election was mainly considered a competition between Comartin and Limoges, Bruck Easton was once again fielded as the candidate of the Progressive Conservatives, while Reform nominated mortgage broker and former magician Scott Cowan. Comartin's campaign manager Joe MacDonald was assigned to him by the NDP. MacDonald was a well-known party insider and campaign manager. Comartin ultimately lost by less than one hundred votes to Limoges in what was initially expected to be a Liberal landslide. Besides a general decline in Liberal popularity, it was speculated that the closeness of the race was in part because of high ticket sales in Windsor for an anticipated Detroit Tigers game happening on the same day. The game may have deflated voter turnout to the detriment of Limoges. Comartin later claimed that MacDonald had not believed that he had a chance of winning and had not worked as hard as he could have because of it. MacDonald denied the allegation, and charged that the problems with the campaign were because of interference by Comartin's family.

Comartin challenged Limoges again the next year with environmental protection as his main issue. The rematch was very similar to the previous year, with it being mainly considered a competition between Comartin and Limoges, and with Bruck Easton appearing yet again as the Progressive Conservative candidate. Since the by-election, the Reform Party had rebranded as the Canadian Alliance in anticipation of a merger with the Progressive Conservatives. The Alliance nominated autoworker Phil Pettinato as their candidate. In their second bout, Comartin narrowly defeated Limoges. Besides the strong support expected from progressives and union members, Comartin also benefitted from conservatives who strategically voted for him in the hopes of harming the ruling Liberals. Comartin's victory was attributed to the conservative strategic vote.

Through his victory, Comartin became the first New Democrat to be elected in Ontario in ten years, and the first New Democrat to represent an Ontario riding in seven; Michael Breaugh had won a by-election in Oshawa in 1990, but had been defeated with the NDP's nine other Ontario MPs in the 1993 Canadian federal election. Shortly after being elected, Comartin was appointed as his party's critic for the environment.

Following the September 11 attacks, Comartin caused controversy by opposing direct military intervention to assist the United States in its invasion of Afghanistan. He did, however, support greatly expanding the Canadian military budget in order to properly meet pre-existing commitments.

In 2002, Deputy Prime Minister Herb Gray of Windsor West was removed in a cabinet shuffle by Prime Minister Jean Chretien. Instead of serving out the rest of his term, Gray decided to resign from parliament to become Canadian Chair of the International Joint Commission. In the ensuing by-election, Comartin supported the campaign of city councillor Brian Masse, who went on to win Gray's old seat. Masse became the NDP caucus' second Ontario MP after Comartin, and the NDP would go on to control both of Windsor's federal ridings for the next seventeen years. Comartin and Masse had a close working relationship, and were nicknamed "The Twindsors."

=== Leadership bid ===
Almost immediately after being elected, Comartin was talked about in Windsor as a potential successor to Alexa McDonough as Leader of the NDP. Comartin did not hide his interest in the position, and a Toronto political scientist suggested that he would have a strong starting position as the NDP's only MP from Ontario.

In preparation for declaring his candidacy, Comartin recruited prominent union activist Peter Leibovitch as his campaign manager.

Comartin intended to announce his candidacy on July 29, 2002. Comartin had previously made an agreement with leadership competitor Lorne Nystrom to have the latter's announcement made on July 31, 2002, but a misprint in The Canadian Press reported that Nystrom would be announcing his candidacy on the 29th as well. Initially believing it to be an intentional slight, Comartin cancelled his announcement to avoid having it on the same day as Nystrom. Comartin instead announced his candidacy on August 13, becoming the last candidate to enter the race.

Comartin was not considered a serious candidate by the campaigns of the perceived frontrunners, Toronto city councillor Jack Layton, NDP House Leader Bill Blaikie, and veteran MP Lorne Nystrom: The Layton campaign dismissed the idea that Comartin could draw Ontarian support away from Layton, Nystrom's campaign manager (and Comartin's campaign manager in the 1999 by-election) Joe MacDonald questioned why Comartin was running, and Blaikie's campaign manager Iain Angus criticised his inexperience as an MP. Howard McCurdy, Comartin's longtime associate, wrote off Comartin's leadership bid as an attempt to raise his profile, and endorsed Blaikie later in the campaign. Additionally, despite his close association with them, the CAW withheld support for Comartin in anticipation of a potential entry into the race by President of the CAW Buzz Hargrove. Hargrove ultimately decided not to run but only endorsed Comartin late into the campaign, which limited the amount of formal assistance he received from the CAW.

To win the leadership, Comartin intended to build a coalition of labour unions, farmers, anti-war activists, Arab Canadians, and Muslim Canadians, with most of his energy focused on the latter two groups. Comartin was frequently involved with Windsor's large Arab community, and had been a vocal critic of the post-9/11 discriminatory backlash against Arabs and Muslims.

Comartin's bold positions on foreign policy caused frequent controversy.

During the campaign, Comartin was approached by the Palestine House non-profit organisation, which suggested that he go on a trip to Iraq to observe the 2002 Iraqi presidential referendum. Comartin agreed to the trip, which was paid for by a businessman associated with Palestine House. Comartin observed the vote, and met with Deputy Prime Minister Tariq Aziz. While in Iraq, Comartin called for an end to embargoes on Iraq on humanitarian grounds, and declared his opposition to a potential American invasion of Iraq. Comartin was criticised for a photo taken of him in Iraq which had a large picture of Saddam Hussein in the background. He dismissed the criticism, stating, "The purpose of the picture is simply to establish that I went to Iraq... If anybody knows anything about Iraq, and the police state that it is, it's almost impossible to be in any public building without a picture of Saddam Hussein." Comartin was very critical of Hussein, describing him as an authoritarian and dictator, and comparing him to Satan.

Once back in Canada, Comartin called for the Canadian government's ban on Hezbollah to be lifted, on the grounds that there was not sufficient evidence to categorise it as a terrorist group. Comartin was criticised by those who held Hezbollah responsible for the 1983 Beirut barracks bombings.

Of all the candidates running in the leadership race, Comartin was considered the most sympathetic toward Palestinians, including supporting the Palestinian right of return. Critics noted that Comartin's website, which mainly focused on foreign affairs, was highly critical of Israel but made no mention of Palestinian terrorism, unlike the websites of all the other candidates. This prompted allegations that Comartin was using anti-Zionist policy positions as a cover for antisemitism. In response, Comartin said that his opposition to Palestinian terrorism "goes without saying." Ish Theilheimer, a Jewish news publisher and former aide to Leader of the ONDP Howard Hampton, endorsed Comartin, and rejected the idea that he was antisemitic or supported antisemitic violence in any way.

Despite the frequent controversy, analysis suggested that Comartin gained more support from his foreign policy positions than he lost. Notably, party membership sign-ups made by the Montreal Muslim community with the intention of voting for Comartin in the leadership race more than doubled the NDP's small Quebec membership. In total, Comartin sold approximately 4,000 new memberships, placing him close behind NDP House Leader Bill Blaikie, who sold 5,500, but far behind Layton, who sold 8,100.

Going into the convention, Comartin predicted that he was in third place behind Layton and Blaikie. He hoped that he had enough support from sign-ups and unions to prevent Layton from winning on the first ballot. Comartin then expected that high turnout in Ontario would allow him to pass Blaikie on the second ballot and eventually defeat Layton.

Comartin's theme songs at the convention were Small Town by John Mellencamp and A Little Less Conversation by Elvis Presley. The Toronto Star sarcastically described the latter choice as appropriate due to the extensive length of the speeches of his surrogates.

At the convention vote Layton won a majority on the first ballot, with Comartin placing fourth behind Blaikie and Nystrom. Comartin's poor showing was attributed to a late start and a lack of focus on domestic issues. Comartin said that it was unlikely he would run for the party's leadership again in future.

At the end of the campaign, Comartin had a budget surplus of $6,800 out of a total campaign revenue of $70,000.

=== Political career following leadership bid ===
Following the leadership race, Layton praised Comartin for "helping to shape the future of this party" and appointed him energy critic and multiculturalism critic, as well as maintaining his previous position as environment critic.

Comartin ran for re-election in 2004 in a second rematch against Rick Limoges. The Conservative Party, created from a merger of the Canadian Alliance and Progressive Conservatives, nominated autoworker Rick Fuschi. The riding, Windsor—St. Clair, had been slightly re-districted and renamed Windsor—Tecumseh. Comartin ran mainly on healthcare expansion and border issues. He prominently criticised an unpopular plan to convert the residential area Michigan Central Railway Tunnel into an international highway, and supported putting stricter measures in place to prevent American police from pursuing suspects into Canada after recent incidents in Windsor and Niagara Falls. Comartin also campaigned on expanding Windsor's auto industry through business incentives for pollution-efficient manufacturing, and through protectionist policies to prevent outsourcing to the United States. During the campaign, Comartin had a public disagreement with Layton; Layton had declared that Prime Minister Paul Martin's budget cuts to affordable housing made him personally responsible for homeless people who died of exposure. Layton was widely criticised for his statement, including by Comartin, who considered it sensationalist. Polling indicated that Comartin's constituents approved of his public disagreement with Layton. Despite the row, Comartin and Layton still made several campaign appearances together, and Comartin defeated Limoges by a wider margin than in 2000.

Following the 2004 election, Comartin was discharged as energy critic and appointed as justice critic. In his role as justice critic, Comartin was described by the Toronto Star as "one of the opposition's best... knowledgeable, quotable, accessible... and a more effective justice and public safety critic than the former justice minister."

Comartin spent most of the summer of 2004 travelling to the United States, United Kingdom, Australia, and New Zealand as part of the Committee of Parliament on National Security, which engaged in a series of international hearings on national security and intelligence sharing in the wake of 9/11. Comartin submitted that the 9/11 attacks could have been prevented if American intelligence agencies had engaged in intelligence sharing with each other instead of hoarding information out of sense of interdepartmental rivalry. Comartin recommended that Canada consolidate its intelligence and security agencies into one department. He also supported the expiry of temporary changes to the Criminal Code made after 9/11 which allowed the police to make arrests without a warrant and which could force witnesses to testify in closed courts.

=== Gay marriage controversy ===
Comartin had a voting record in favour of gay marriage. In 2003 he voted to reject legally defining marriage as being between a man and a woman. When the Supreme Court of Canada ruled that parliament had the right to legalise gay marriage, Comartin called for a vote to legalise it. Believing it to be a civil rights issue and therefore not ethically up for debate, Comartin rejected the idea of a free vote, and wanted the Liberal Party, Bloc Québécois, and NDP to uphold their previous promises to legalise gay marriage by enforcing a vote along party lines.

In January 2005, the Martin Government indicated that it would introduce a vote on gay marriage. In response, Bishop Ronald Fabbro of London, Ontario called on the members of his diocese to lobby against gay marriage. Fabbro also asked the pastors of his diocese to make pronouncements against gay marriage at their sermons. Comartin, a self-described devout Catholic, attended Our Lady of the Rosary Church, which was a part of Fabbro's diocese. Comartin also participated in extensive volunteer work with the church, including teaching a marriage preparation course with his wife.

As it passed through parliament in 2005, Comartin consistently voted in favour of the Civil Marriage Act, which legalised gay marriage in Canada.

Following the passage of the Civil Marriage Act, Fabbro published an open letter announcing that Comartin would be suspended from all liturgical privileges and public church activities. He instructed Gerry Compeau, the pastor of Our Lady of the Rosary, to read the letter aloud to the congregation and hand out copies. Jim Roche, the episcopal vicar of Windsor, clarified that Comartin remained a Catholic in good standing and would still be able to receive communion, but otherwise supported Fabbro's position. The public censure was also endorsed by Cardinal Marc Ouellet.

The reading of the bishop's letter prompted a walkout of 30 of the 150 attendants of the sermon. In a special section of the Windsor Star dedicated to letters of opinion on the controversy, a majority of the letters printed by the Star supported Comartin. Other Catholic MPs criticised the Catholic Church for inconsistency; of all the Catholics in parliament, only Comartin and fellow NDP MP Charlie Angus were excluded from church activities for supporting gay marriage.

Comartin attended the sermon following his censure at Our Lady of the Rosary, where he was well received, after which he attended a picnic hosted by the CAW Lesbian, Gay, Bisexual and Transgender Caucus. Comartin stood by his support for the Civil Marriage Act, calling it "the fair and just thing to do."

In 2007, Our Lady of the Rosary was shut down along with eleven other Windsor Catholic churches. Spokesman Ron Pickersgill, representing Bishop Fabbro and the London diocese, announced that the decision had been made because of declining attendance and high upkeep costs. The building was later purchased and converted into the Water's Edge Event Centre .

=== Parliamentary leadership roles ===
In early 2005, the Liberal Martin Government altered its annual budget after negotiations with the NDP in order to prevent the fall of its minority government. Late in 2005, after the conclusion of the investigation into the Liberal Sponsorgate scandal, the Liberals were unwilling to meet the NDP's terms for their continued support. As a result, the NDP voted in favour of a motion of no-confidence put forward by the Conservative Party, which forced a rare winter election scheduled to take place in January 2006. Like the rest of the NDP caucus, Comartin voted in favour of both the altered Liberal budget and the no-confidence vote.

Early in the campaign, President of the CAW Buzz Hargrove eschewed his usual endorsement of the NDP. Instead, he encouraged CAW members to only support the NDP in ridings they were likely to win, and to otherwise support Liberal candidates to prevent Conservative candidates from winning. Comartin described Hargrove's position as "disappointing," but noted that the local CAW backlash against Hargrove's decision was so great that it actually helped his campaign. Comartin was endorsed by CAW Local 444 President Ken Lewenza Sr., who went on to become President of the CAW after Hargrove's retirement. After the campaign, Hargrove was expelled from the NDP, which Comartin opposed.

Comartin's main competition in the election was Bruck Easton, who was running as the Liberal candidate in a final attempt at elected office. After serving as the party's national treasurer, Easton became the final president of the Progressive Conservative Party before it merged with the Canadian Alliance. Easton had been guarded about the merger, and switched to the Liberal Party after prominent Reform/Alliance member Stephen Harper was chosen as the new Conservative Party's first leader. Easton was notably endorsed by Howard McCurdy, who Easton had run against in his first attempt at elected office in 1988. Comartin dismissed McCurdy's ability to influence the election outcome. The Conservatives renominated Rick Fuschi. As in previous elections, Comartin emphasised expanding healthcare coverage and protectionist trade policies to maintain Windsor's auto industry. Despite expectations of a potentially close race, Comartin won a commanding victory, with Easton barely outpolling Fuschi for a distant second place.

Following the 2006 election Comartin began to take on a series of parliamentary leadership roles. In February 2006, Comartin was appointed Deputy House Leader of the NDP, serving under House Leader of the NDP Libby Davies. That same year, Comartin was appointed vice-chair of the Standing Committee on Public Safety and National Security.

Comartin was part of a Canadian delegation to Russia in June 2006 along with Conservative MP Stockwell Day and Liberal MP Irwin Cotler, when Cotler was allegedly poisoned by the Russian government. Cotler had previously acted as the lawyer or public advocate for Russian dissidents Natan Sharansky, Andrei Sakharov, Alexander Nikitin, and Sergei Magnitsky.

In 2007, Comartin was voted "most knowledgeable member of parliament" by other MPs in a Maclean's poll. Comartin did not vote in the poll as he had a personal boycott against Maclean's for being "grossly unfair and inaccurate" in its consistently low ranking of the University of Windsor as a school. He was also elected "most knowledgeable member of parliament" in 2009 and 2011.

Comartin supported the legalisation of sports betting as a means of generating revenue and as a way to regulate underground sports betting already taking place. Comartin's secondary objective was to generate more revenue for the Canadian Football League (CFL) in order to prevent the American National Football League (NFL) from expanding into Canada. Comartin made his first attempt to legalise sports betting in 2008 by introducing a private member's bill into parliament. His first attempt did not progress pass its first reading. His second and third attempts made in 2011 and 2013 both passed through the House of Commons but expired in the Senate. A fourth unsuccessful attempt was made by Brian Masse on Comartin's behalf in 2013. Sports betting was eventually legalised in 2020, after Comartin's retirement from parliament, with a private member's bill introduced by Conservative Kevin Waugh.

Comartin was commended for his role on the ethics committee investigation into charges of bribery against former prime minister Brian Mulroney in the airbus affair.

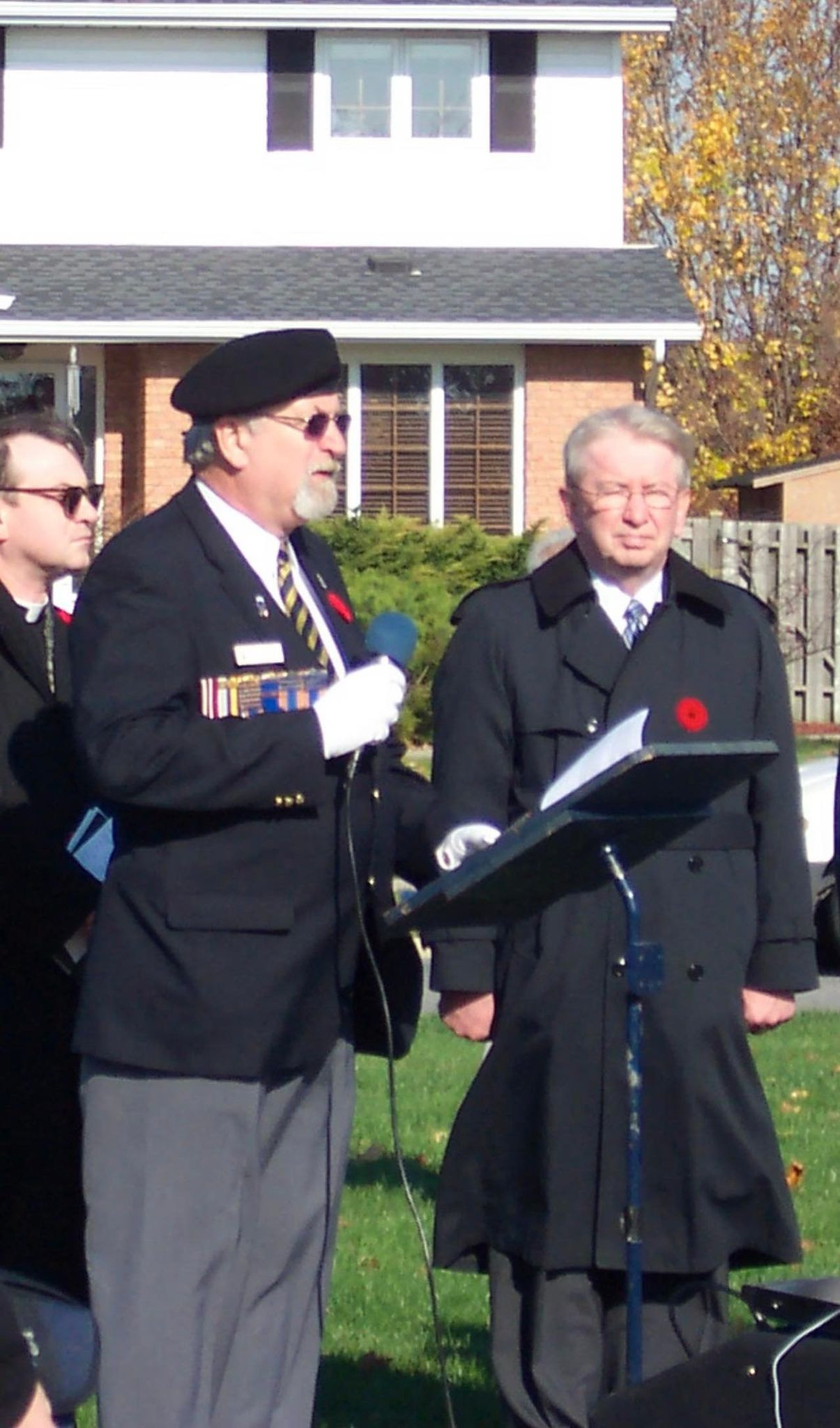
Comartin with the former president of Royal Canadian Legion Branch 261, Mike Glovasky, at Tecumseh's 2008 Remembrance Day ceremony.

Comartin was widely expected to win in the 2008 Canadian federal election, and ran against a collection of novice candidates. The Conservative candidate was business management consultant Denise Ghanam, while the Liberals ran government relations manager Steve Mastroianni. Comartin was easily elected to a fourth term. While still placing fourth, the Green Party notably had its best-ever result in the riding with candidate Kyle Prestanski, an environmental science graduate student. Following his re-election, Comartin called for greater cooperation between the NDP and the Liberals, foreshadowing his support for an unsuccessful attempt by the two parties to form a coalition government after the election. It was speculated that if the coalition government had successfully formed that Comartin would have been made Minister of Justice. However, during the coalition negotiations Comartin also mounted an unsuccessful challenge against Liberal incumbent Peter Milliken for the role of Speaker of the House, placing fourth on the fifth ballot behind Millikin and Conservatives Andrew Scheer and Mervin Tweed.

Having won by a wider margin in every election, Comartin was concerned that low turnout by overconfident supporters would threaten his chances of re-election in the 2011 Canadian federal election. Comartin campaigned on job creation, expanding pensions, lowering the tax rate on small businesses, and providing business incentives for the renewable energy sector. The Conservatives nominated Denise Ghanam for a second time, while future MP Irek Kusmierczyk was the Liberal candidate. Comartin's concerns turned out to be misplaced, as he won with his best ever result, gaining a near-majority of the vote. The 2011 election was also the NDP's best ever result, becoming the Official Opposition for the first time.

With the NDP becoming the Official Opposition, Comartin was promoted to Deputy House Leader of the Official Opposition, as well as vice-chair of the Standing Committee on Justice and Human Rights, and vice-chair of the Standing Committee on Procedure and House Affairs. His former superior, Libby Davies, was replaced by Tom Mulcair as House Leader of the Official Opposition, although Davies remained Co-Deputy Leader of the NDP alongside Mulcair. Shortly after, Jack Layton took a leave of absence as Leader of the NDP and Leader of the Opposition for health reasons, appointing Nycole Turmel as interim leader. Layton subsequently died of complications related to cancer. Under Turmel's interim leadership, Comartin retained his role of justice critic. After Mulcair stepped down as House Leader to run for leadership of the party, Comartin was made the new House Leader. Comartin declined to make a second attempt at leadership of the party, citing his advanced age (he turned 64 in 2011). He also declined to formally endorse a candidate in the leadership race in order to maintain his impartiality as House Leader, but spoke highly of Niki Ashton and hosted her campaign event in Windsor. At the leadership convention Ashton was eliminated on the first ballot after placing last, with Mulcair winning on the fourth ballot.

Following Mulcair's election as leader in 2012, Comartin was replaced as House Leader of the Opposition by Nathan Cullen and replaced as justice critic by Francoise Boivin. He was, however, appointed critic for democratic reform. The apparent demotion was attributed to Cullen's greater prominence in the party after placing third in the leadership race, and a desire to give Boivin, a former Liberal MP turned New Democrat MP, a prominent position to improve her chances of re-election. That same year, Comartin was acclaimed as Deputy Speaker of the House, serving under Speaker of the House Andrew Scheer. Comartin replaced fellow New Democrat Denise Savoie, who had resigned from parliament for health reasons. Upon being acclaimed, Comartin declared that his priorities would be to maintain the civility and decorum of the House. Comartin's first act as Deputy Speaker was to censure Brian Masse for using his debate time to congratulate him on his acclamation to Deputy Speaker when it was not the topic of debate.

Assuming the role of Deputy Speaker required Comartin to step down from his remaining critic roles and committee positions. Two months into his tenure, Comartin admitted that he preferred being able to participate in debate rather than act as a neutral arbiter.

After fourteen years in office, including two years as Deputy Speaker, Comartin announced that he would not run for re-election in the 2015 Canadian federal election. In a four-way race, Cheryl Hardcastle, the former deputy mayor of Tecumseh, was selected as the NDP nominee to succeed Comartin in Windsor—Tecumseh. Hardcastle's main competitor for the nomination was Comartin staffer and co-founder of the Canadian Afghanistan War Veterans Association Bruce Moncur. Hardcastle held the riding for the NDP in 2015, but nationally the party dropped back down to third place despite anticipation from supporters that the party could form government for the first time. Hardcastle would later lose in an upset to Liberal Irek Kusmierczyk, who had himself placed a distant third to Comartin in 2011.

== Consul General of Canada ==
Following the 2015 election Comartin began a three-year break from public life, although he still made occasional public statements. He began teaching political science at the University of Windsor in 2016.

Comartin described President Donald Trump as erratic, and was concerned that his policies would damage the United States-Canadian trade relationship, the ease of commuting across the border to work, and the ease of border crossing more generally.

Comartin was critical of Tom Mulcair's decision to stay on temporarily as Leader of the NDP after being removed in a leadership review instead of resigning and appointing an interim leader ahead of the 2017 New Democratic Party leadership election. No longer bound by the impartiality expected from being House Leader, Comartin formally endorsed Niki Ashton in her second bid for leadership. Ashton placed third out of a field of four, behind runner-up Charlie Angus and winner Jagmeet Singh.

In 2018, Comartin was approached by the Trudeau Government to see if he was interested in replacing Douglas George as the Consul General in Detroit. Comartin was surprised he was offered the position given his age and lack of interest in the position, and assumed that he was approached because of his closeness with the auto industry. While initially hesitant to take the position, Comartin ultimately accepted in order to facilitate an expansion of the auto industry in Windsor following the ratification of the Canada-United States-Mexico Agreement (CUSMA) His term began on October 29, 2018.

The Trudeau Government assigned Comartin three major priorities for his term: oversee the conclusion of the then-ongoing negotiations of CUSMA, settle an ongoing steel and aluminum tariff dispute with the United States, and monitor the ongoing construction of the Gordie Howe International Bridge. Comartin also had a personal interest in encouraging American tourism toward Windsor, particularly for its casino and wine industries.

Comartin described his work as 80% meeting with American politicians and corporate executives, and 20% administrative work, with a majority of the administrative work being dedicated to trade and commerce between Canada and the United States.

Comartin was supportive of Canadian automotive technology companies attending the North American International Auto Show in Detroit.

Near the end of Comartin's term as Consul General, Freedom Convoy protestors blockaded the Ambassador Bridge connecting Windsor and Detroit. Comartin testified at the Public Order Emergency Commission, which investigated Prime Minister Justin Trudeau's use of the Emergencies Act to disperse the protestors. Comartin reported to the inquiry that there was great concern in American political circles that the different branches of the Canadian government seemed unable to work together to remove the blockade prior to the use of the Emergencies Act, resulting in billions of dollars in lost revenue from stopped international commerce.

Comartin's term ended on July 28, 2022. By the end of his term, CUSMA had been ratified. Likewise, the steel and aluminum tariff dispute had concluded, for which Comartin took credit. The Gordie Howe Bridge is expected to open in 2024.

Upon his retirement, Comartin noted that he had had a particularly good working relationship with governors Gretchen Whitmer of Michigan and Eric Holcomb of Indiana. He was succeeded as Consul General by trade specialist Colin Bird.

== Political positions ==
Comartin identifies as a social democrat and has described himself as moderately to the left of the NDP platform. He supports giving the riding associations and other party-aligned grassroots organisations much more influence in setting party policy.

In the early 2000s the NDP was ideologically split. The right wing of the party supported the Third Way trend set by Tony Blair, which had been emulated by Alexa McDonough. The left wing of the party formed the New Politics Initiative (NPI) faction, which pushed for further left policies, the abolition of the NDP, and the following creation of a new leftist party. Like Jack Layton, Comartin was part of the centre-left of the party, which was sympathetic to the NPI but not affiliated with it.

=== Economic policy ===
During the 2003 NDP leadership race, Comartin was considered the furthest left candidate on economic policy, not including minor candidate Bev Meslo.

Comartin has dismissed the idea of nationalising banks or oil companies.

Comartin has proposed eliminating Canada's goods and services tax from essential services such as home heating. He also supports the creation of a regulatory agency which would set price controls for gasoline and other common fuels.

Comartin was very critical of the North American Free Trade Agreement (NAFTA) and free trade with the United States for most of his career. Near the start of his career as an MP, he accused NAFTA of undermining Canadian sovereignty to American business interests and worsening income inequality. He instead proposed creating trade deals "modelled on the European Union, which protect the environment, human rights and cultural distinctions." Amidst Canadian-American tariff negotiations in 2006, Comartin suggested that Canada should leave NAFTA if the United States did not remove tariffs on Canadian softwood lumber. As late as the 2012 NDP leadership race, Comartin voiced his disapproval of Tom Mulcair's intention to shift the party's trade policy to be in favour of free trade. However, when asked about NAFTA halfway through his term as Consul General, Comartin said "overall it was positive when we brought it into effect. There was certainly a lot of opposition to it for concerns, some of which turned out to not be valid, others which in fact did surface and continue to be [valid], some of which fortunately were addressed in the USMCA, the new one." Comartin elaborated that while NAFTA caused significant job loss in manufacturing jobs such as in Windsor's auto industry, it had been offset by overall higher job creation and economic growth, and that the trade relationship between Canada, the United States, and Mexico had been more beneficial than the European Union. While still supporting protectionist policies for some key economic sectors, he described a national policy of protectionism as a danger to ongoing economic partnership.

Comartin opposes selling office buildings owned by the federal government on the grounds that more revenue can be accumulated through rent than through the lump-sum income earned from a sale.

=== Election process ===
Comartin supports introducing a proportional representation voting system in Canada. He also supports abolishing the Senate.

Comartin is supportive of collaborating with the Parti Québécois and emulating their provincial social democratic policies on the federal level. Comartin believes that Quebec has a right to separate with a simple majority of the vote, contrary to the Clarity Act, but personally opposes separation.

During a crucial 2005 budget vote, Comartin accused Prime Minister Paul Martin of bribing Conservative MPs to cross the floor to the Liberal Party in exchange for desirable postings. Comartin supports a procedural reform to allow MPs to disaffiliate from their party and sit as an independent in parliament, but which would require them to resign and run in a by-election if they switched parties. As it stands, MPs may switch party affiliation and remain in office until the next federal election.

Comartin supports reforming the selection process for superior court judges. Rather than have the partisan Minister of Justice make selections from screening committees under their ministry's control, Comartin instead supports the entire federal cabinet selecting candidates put forward by a non-partisan screening committee.

Comartin has proposed a series of changes to parliamentary procedure including prohibitions and fines on any sexist, racist, or homophobic remarks, compelling apologies for any such remarks, suspending MPs who persistently and willfully disrupt proceedings, and giving the Speaker of the House the power to refuse to call on MPs unable to maintain order. Likewise, Comartin supports introducing a more formal code of conduct for the cabinet.

Comartin supports making the expenses of MPs more publicly available, although he prefers having an annual private audit rather than have it be the responsibility of the Auditor General. In the Windsor Star's publication of expenses in the 2007-2008 fiscal year, Comartin was found to have the lowest expenses compared to the other local MPs, Brian Masse of Windsor West and Jeff Watson of Essex. Comartin's expenses grew after he became Deputy Speaker of the House. In a 2011 report, Comartin was also found to have the best attendance of the three.

Comartin is opposed to the use of attack ads.

=== Environmental policy ===
Comartin supports putting tighter restrictions on pollution to improve water and air quality. He blames the United States for half of the air pollution in Windsor due to its continued construction of coal plants in the region. Likewise, Comartin has voiced concerns over the reportedly poor maintenance and upkeep of the Fermi 2 nuclear plant in Michigan.

Comartin supports the Kyoto Protocol and a ban on single-hull oil tankers. Comartin was highly critical of the Martin Government's allocation of funds for Canada's Kyoto Protocol commitments. While the Martin Government budgeted one billion dollars as promised, Comartin noted it was put into a trust; the Auditor General had previously criticised the Martin Government's trusts for being unaccountable and lacking in transparency, and for not spending the majority of the money allotted to them. Comartin also pointed out that a sizable portion of the money was reserved for research rather than the construction of renewable energy projects: "We don't need more research — we know how the wind works. A loan-grant program would have been much better, so people could have had access to capital to actually build some projects."

Comartin supports tougher restrictions on animal abuse and having animals legally recognised as persons instead of property.

=== Foreign policy ===
Comartin supported Canadian peacekeepers being deployed to Rwanda during the Rwandan Genocide. He regretted that the Canadian response had not been significantly larger, and felt that the mission that was sent was inadequate.

Comartin is supportive of Canada's territorial claims in the arctic, and is suspicious of potential American encroachment on Canada's claims.

Comartin supports allowing citizens to cross the United States-Canada border using their driver's license as identification, rather than passports being the only acceptable form of identification, to encourage cross-border tourism and commerce.

Comartin considers the Holodomor to be a genocide.

=== Public safety ===
Comartin has been particularly concerned over a lack of safety measures for migrant farm workers. Migrant workers in Leamington, Ontario testified to Comartin in early 2001 that they were forced to spray pesticides without protection and work without overtime pay in poor living conditions under the threat of being deported back to Mexico. Comartin attributed their poor working conditions to insufficient health and safety regulations, poor enforcement of existing regulations, and a lack of union representation. Comartin renewed his push for greater regulations following the deaths of three migrant workers in Kitchener in late 2001 from hydrogen sulfide poisoning. Comartin supported the opening of the Migrant Agricultural Workers Support Center in Leamington, which advocates for migrant workers, especially for their right to collective bargaining and for their inclusion in the Occupational Health and Safety Act.

Comartin is opposed to the use of cannabis. Prior to its legalisation, he supported making cannabis possession a non-criminal offence. Despite being opposed to its use, he expected that gradual decriminalisation would lead to legalisation.

Comartin supports the Canadian Firearms Registry, believing it to be a vital tool for police. Comartin attributed a decline in gun deaths to the introduction of the registry, stating "A lot of people who probably shouldn't have had guns or didn't know how to use them decided to get rid of their guns because they had to register them." He has voted against attempts to abolish it.

Comartin believes that Cybertip , a government tipline to report child pornography, is inadequately funded. Comartin supported a bill to raise the age of consent from 14 to 16.

In his role as justice critic, Comartin announced the NDP would not support a Liberal bill making it easier for the federal government to seize the assets of convicted gang members and drug traffickers. Comartin doubted the constitutionality of the bill, as it created a reverse onus which shifted the burden of proof from the government to the suspect. Comartin opposed similar bills introduced by the Conservatives. Comartin opposes mandatory minimum sentences except for large-scale white-collar crimes; Comartin believes that crime is not deterred by harsher sentences, but is deterred by a fear of being caught. To that end, he supports expanding the size of police forces to deter street crime, and stronger regulations and more frequent audits to deter white-collar crime. Additionally, Comartin supports expanding the availability of youth programs, women's shelters, mental health services, and housing, which he believes will alleviate the root causes of crime. While supporting police expansion, Comartin believes there is insufficient civilian oversight of the Royal Canadian Mounted Police (RCMP) and Canadian Security Intelligence Service (CSIS).

Comartin is opposed to the death penalty.

Comartin agrees with the Supreme Court verdict made in Canada v. Bedford, which legalised prostitution in Canada.

=== Social services ===
Comartin supports expanding Canadian healthcare coverage to include prescription drugs and long-term care facilities.

Comartin supports government-subsidised daycare, and spoke positively of a similar program in Quebec. He also supports expanding the Canada Pension Plan, Old Age Security, and Employment Insurance.

Comartin opposes the privatisation of utilities.

Comartin supports expanding the funding for immigration settlement services, and supported a bill to allow immigrants living in Canada to sponsor the immigration of non-dependent close relatives. Likewise, Comartin supported a bill to regulate the conduct of immigration consultants.

Comartin supports Canada's current system of legal abortion.

Comartin is ambivalent about the idea of legalising euthanasia, and prefers improving palliative care as an alternative. He is concerned that "mercy killings" might become a regular component of an underfunded healthcare system.

== Personal life ==
Comartin married his wife, Maureen Comartin (née Granger), on July 5, 1969. Mrs. Comartin was a schoolteacher, and active in the community in education services. She was the program director and supervisor of the Child's Place Family Centre, president of the Sandwich Teen Action Group, and education committee chairwoman of the Windsor chapter of the Canadian Federation of University Women. Together they had three children: Eric, Heidi, and Adam. Eric occasionally acted as a spokesman for Comartin's campaigns. Comartin has seven grandchildren.

Comartin is fond of tenor singing and the works of J.R.R. Tolkien. Comartin's favourite authors are Margaret Atwood, Alistair MacLeod, and Guy Vanderhaeghe. He has also studied Roman and Mongolian military history. He occasionally drinks beer.

Comartin's serious nature has been frequently commented on. Shortly before her retirement, Leader of the NDP Alexa McDonough recommended that Comartin should smile more, stating "He's got this sort of deadly earnestness about him." Comartin was described in a profile as someone who is "cool in the spotlight, rarely misspeaks and eschews the backslapping charm expected of many politicians...too decent a guy, to a fault [and] non-plussed with the pomp and politicking of Ottawa." Windsor Star journalist Gord Henderson described him as an "intense, ramrod stiff New Democrat, a guy who only cracks a smile at gunpoint and [only] provided it's loaded..."

Comartin dislikes Twitter. When first asked if he would be creating a Twitter profile, Comartin replied that "he couldn't fathom devoting lots of his time telling people trivial things about his life in 140 characters or less." During the 2011 election he created a Twitter account which was managed by his staff and later deleted.

== Electoral record ==
1997 Canadian federal election: Windsor-St. Clair
Party	Candidate	Votes	%	±%
Liberal	Shaughnessy Cohen	16,496	39.88	-15.81%
New Democratic	Joe Comartin	14,237	34.42	+12.90%
Reform	Harold Downs	5,899	14.26	+4.19%
Progressive Conservative	Bruck Easton	4,253	10.28	-0.76%
Green	Timothy Dugdale	357	0.86	-0.05%
Marxist–Leninist	Dale Woodyard	115	0.27	+0.13%
Total valid votes		41,357	100.00	

By-election on 12 April 1999 Windsor-St. Clair
Party	Candidate	Votes
Liberal	Rick Limoges	13,891	43.64	+3.76%
New Democratic	Joe Comartin	13,800	43.35	+8.93%
Progressive Conservative	Bruck Easton	2,074	6.51	-3.77%
Reform	Scott Cowan	1,956	6.14	-8.12%
Independent	John Turmel	106	0.33	+0.33%
Total valid votes		31,827	100.00

2000 Canadian federal election: Windsor-St. Clair
Party	Candidate	Votes	%	±%
New Democratic	Joe Comartin	17,001	40.83	-2.52%
Liberal	Rick Limoges	16,600	39.87	-3.77%
Alliance	Phil Pettinato	5,639	13.54	+7.40%
Progressive Conservative	Bruck Easton	1,906	4.57	-1.94%
Green	Stephen Lockwood	390	0.93	+0.93%
Marxist–Leninist	Dale Woodyard	95	0.22	+0.22%
Total valid votes		41,631	100.00	

2004 Canadian federal election: Windsor-Tecumseh
Party	Candidate	Votes	%	±%
New Democratic	Joe Comartin	20,037	41.85	+1.02%
Liberal	Rick Limoges	16,219	33.87	-6.00%
Conservative	Rick Fuschi	9,827	20.52	+2.41%
Green	Élizabeth Powles	1,613	3.36	+2.43%
Marxist–Leninist	Laura Chesnik	182	0.38	+0.16%
Total valid votes		47,878	100.00	

2006 Canadian federal election: Windsor-Tecumseh
Party	Candidate	Votes	%	±%
New Democratic	Joe Comartin	22,646	44.62	+2.77%
Liberal	Bruck Easton	13,412	26.43	-8.44%
Conservative	Rick Fuschi	12,852	25.32	+4.80%
Green	Catherine Pluard	1,644	3.23	-0.13%
Marxist–Leninist	Laura Chesnik	193	0.38	0.00%
Total valid votes		50,747	100.00	

2008 Canadian federal election: Windsor-Tecumseh
Party	Candidate	Votes	%	±%
New Democratic	Joe Comartin	20,045	48.87%	+4.25%
Conservative	Denise Ghanam	9,826	23.95%	-1.37%
Liberal	Steve Mastroianni	8,494	20.71%	-5.72%
Green	Kyle Prestanski	2,649	6.45%	+3.22%
Total valid votes		41,014	100.00	

2011 Canadian federal election: Windsor-Tecumseh
Party	Candidate	Votes	%	±%
New Democratic	Joe Comartin	22,224	49.90%	+1.20%
Conservative	Denise Ghanam	14,954	33.57%	+9.65%
Liberal	Irek Kusmierczyk	5,764	12.94%	-8.02%
Green	Kyle Prestanski	1,354	3.04%	-3.54%
Marxist–Leninist	Laura Chesnik	244	0.55%	+0.55%
Total valid votes		44,540	100.00%	

Note: Canadian Alliance vote is compared to the Reform vote in 1997 election, and Conservative vote is compared to combined Canadian Alliance and Progressive Conservative vote in 2000.
