= Progressive Conservative Party of Ontario candidates in the 1999 Ontario provincial election =

The Progressive Conservative Party of Ontario ran a full slate of candidates in the 1999 provincial election, and elected 59 members in 103 constituencies to win a majority government. Many of these candidates have their own biography pages; information on others may be found here.

== Chris Loreto (Trinity—Spadina) ==
Loreto was a 22-year-old political science student at the University of Toronto during the election. He was a New Democratic Party supporter and election worker before 1993, when he joined the Progressive Conservative Party of Canada (Toronto Star, 7 May 1999). He received 7,323 votes (20.50%), finishing third against New Democratic Party incumbent Rosario Marchese.

Loreto later worked in the office of the provincial Attorney-General (Canada NewsWire, 2 March 2001, 17:24 report). He is now a director of the Conservative Party of Canada party association in Etobicoke—Lakeshore. During the 2006 federal election, he complained that aboriginal issues were not being addressed (Toronto Star, 7 January 2006).

== Michael C. Rohrer (Windsor—St. Clair) ==
Rohrer was 28 years old at the time of the 1999 election (Windsor Star, 1 June 1999). He holds a Bachelor of Arts in political science degree from the University of Windsor. He owned a lawn care business while in university (Windsor Star, 3 June 1995), and was named to the Appraisal Institute of Canada in 1994.

He attended the federal Progressive Conservative Party's leadership convention in 1993, and was a vocal opponent of Kim Campbell's leadership bid. At the time, Windsor lawyer and prominent organizer Tory Bruck Easton was described by the local press as Rohrer's political mentor (Windsor Star, 11 May 1995).

Rohrer contested in Windsor—Walkerville in the 1995 provincial election and received 3,610 votes (14.50%), finishing third against Liberal candidate Dwight Duncan. He worked as a political staffer to the Progressive Conservative caucus from 1995 to 1998, before returning to Windsor to work as a professional real estate appraiser.

In 1999, he received 7,241 votes (18.78%) in the redistributed Windsor—St. Clair constituency. He again finished third against Duncan. Rohrer supported Tom Long's bid to lead the Canadian Alliance in 2000, and was co-chair of Long's campaign organization in Essex County and Chatham-Kent (Windsor Star, 12 May 2000).

He was appointed to the Ontario Assessment Review Board in 2000 by the Progressive Conservative government of Mike Harris.

In 2004, Rohrer wrote a letter to the Windsor Star in which he criticized Bruck Easton for refusing to support the newly formed Conservative Party of Canada. He described Easton as a "former friend" (Windsor Star, 19 June 2004).

== David McCamon (Windsor West) ==
McCamon was a 33-year-old Ford Motor Company autoworker in Windsor at the time of the election. He had previously done organization work for the Reform Party of Canada (Windsor Star, 6 May 1999).

When the results were announced, he commented, "This whole election has gone exactly as I expected. We have a PC majority with a Liberal in Windsor-West. It's not a surprise, it's not a disappointment. I think we did the best campaign we could with the money and resources we had" (Windsor Star, 4 June 1999).

McCamon sought a federal Canadian Alliance nomination in 2000, but was defeated. He was appointed to the Windsor Police Services Board in 2002, and served until 2004 (Windsor Star, 29 November 2002 and 30 November 2004).
