= 2003 New Democratic Party leadership election =

Party election in Canada

- January 25, 2003
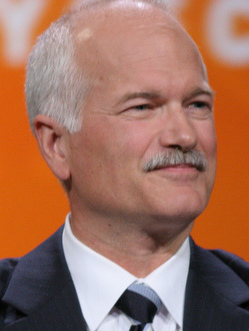

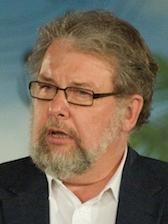

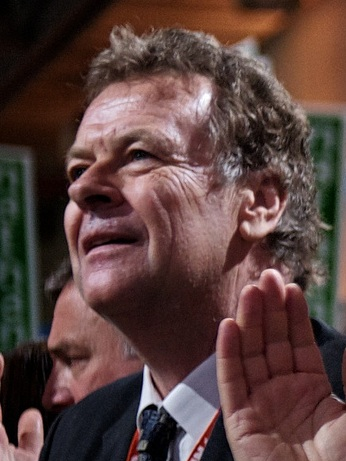

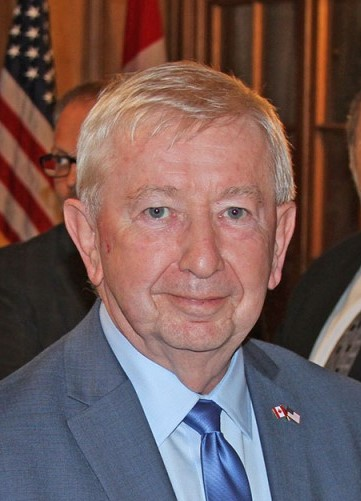
Candidate	Jack Layton	Bill Blaikie
Member votes	22,453 (51.44%)	10,914 (25.00%)
Labour votes	572 (59.77%)	227 (23.72%)
Weighted votes	31,149.95 (53.52%)	14,365.41 (24.68%)
Candidate	Lorne Nystrom	Joe Comartin
Member votes	4,865 (11.14%)	3,289 (7.53%)
Labour votes	35 (3.65%)	79 (8.25%)
Weighted votes	5,397.16 (9.27%)	4,490.15 (7.71%)
Leader before election
Alexa McDonough
Elected leader
Jack Layton

2003 New Democratic Party leadership election
- Date: January 24, 2003
- Convention: Ricoh Coliseum, Exhibition Place; Toronto, Ontario
- Resigning leader: Alexa McDonough
- Won by: Jack Layton
- Ballots: 1
- Candidates: 6
- Entrance fee: $7,500
- Spending limit: $500,000

In 2003, the New Democratic Party held a leadership election to replace retiring leader Alexa McDonough. It ended on January 25, 2003, with the first ballot victory of popular Toronto city councillor Jack Layton.

The election was the first to be conducted under the NDP's new partial one member, one vote system, in which the popular vote of the members is weighted for 75% of the result. The rest are votes cast by delegates for affiliated organizations, mainly labour unions. It was also the first Canadian leadership convention to allow Internet voting; delegates who chose to vote electronically were given a password to a secure website to register their votes.

The race was heated, with the leaders campaigning to NDP audiences across Canada. One of the most notable events of the campaign occurred at the convention in Toronto, the day before the election, when candidate Pierre Ducasse made a stirring speech. Ducasse's speech attracted widespread praise, although its late delivery was unable to sway the postal and internet votes which had already been cast.

== Timeline ==
=== 2002 ===
- June 5 – Alexa McDonough announces she will step down as leader.
- June 17 – Bill Blaikie declares his candidacy.
- July 5–7 – The NDP Federal Council convenes to adopt rules.
- June 25 – Pierre Ducasse declares his candidacy.
- July 22 – Jack Layton declares his candidacy.
- July 30 – Bev Meslo declares her candidacy.
- July 31 – Lorne Nystrom declares his candidacy.
- August 13 – Joe Comartin declares his candidacy.
- November 26 – Final day for candidates to declare candidacy.
- December 12 – Last day to become an NDP member who can vote.

=== 2003 ===
- January 24 – The convention begins in Toronto, Ontario.
- January 25 – Ballots are cast, Layton declared victorious.

== Candidates ==
=== Jack Layton ===
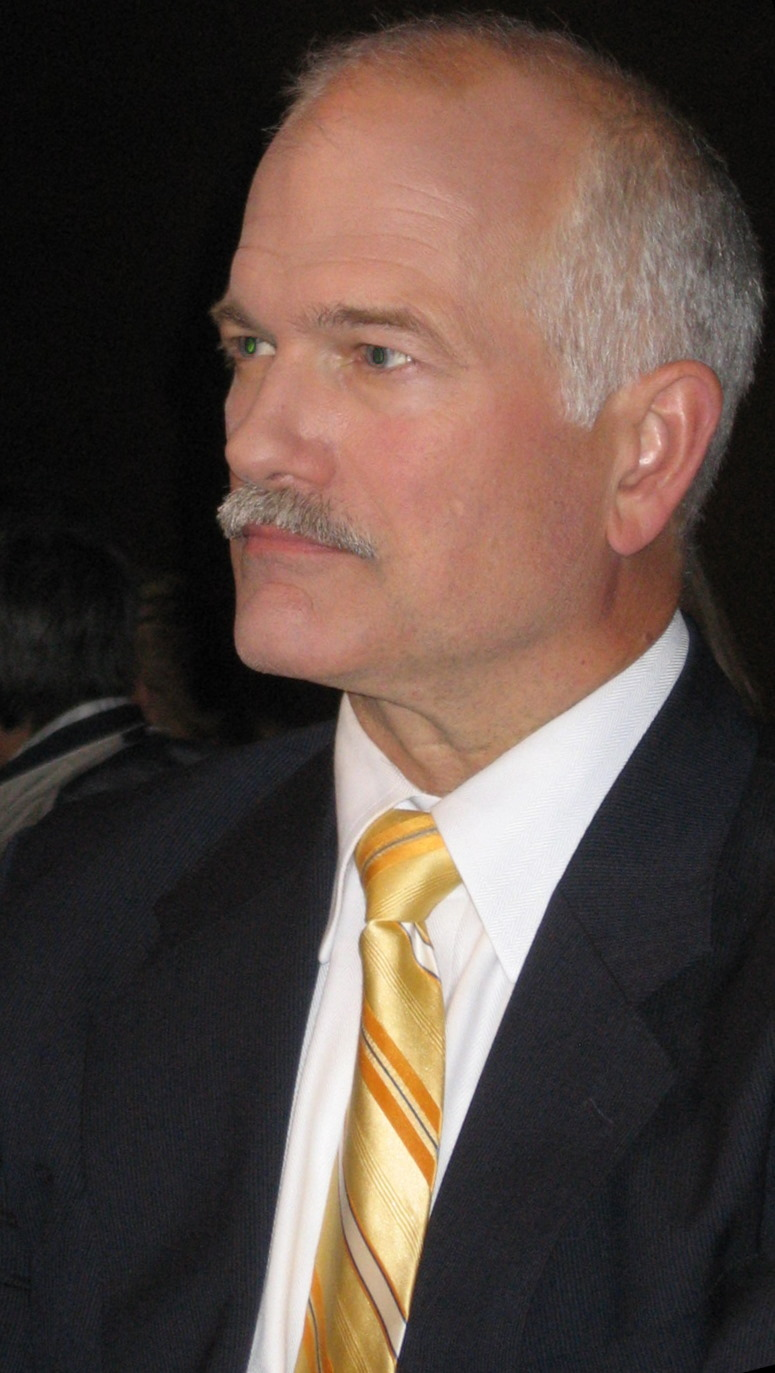
Jack Layton

At the time of the election, Jack Layton was serving on Toronto City Council for Ward 30 and vice chair of Toronto Hydro, and a former university lecturer and environmental consultant. He had run and lost in both the 1993 and 1997 federal elections. His emphases included homelessness, affordable housing, opposing violence, the natural environment and the green economy. While other campaigns stressed federal experience, Layton's campaign contended that his record on Toronto council and as former president of the Federation of Canadian Municipalities encompassed national issues and would transfer to the federal stage, and that as Alexa McDonough had on her election as leader, he could lead the party successfully from outside Parliament until winning his own seat.

- Endorsements: Ed Broadbent (NDP leader, 1975–1989), Svend Robinson, Libby Davies, former Ontario New Democratic Party leader Stephen Lewis
- Date campaign launched: July 22, 2002

=== Bill Blaikie ===
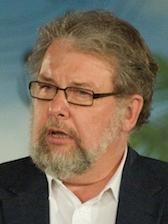
Bill Blaikie

At the time of the election, Bill Blaikie was the MP for Winnipeg—Transcona, the NDP House leader and the critic on intergovernmental affairs, justice, the Solicitor General, and parliamentary reform. He had served as a member of Parliament (MP) since the 1979 Canadian federal election. His emphases included trade, Medicare, taxes and the environment, and his parliamentary experience. An ordained minister in the United Church of Canada, Blaikie was a prominent heir to the Social Gospel, Christian left tradition deeply rooted in the NDP.

- Endorsements: MPs Wendy Lill, Judy Wasylycia-Leis, Pat Martin, Bev Desjarlais, Dick Proctor and Yvon Godin, Manitoba Premier Gary Doer, Ontario NDP leader Howard Hampton and several former MPs
- Date campaign launched: June 17, 2002

=== Lorne Nystrom ===
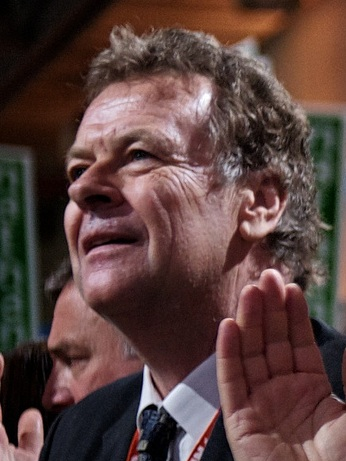
Lorne Nystrom

Lorne Nystrom had served as the MP for Regina—Qu'Appelle from 1997 at the time of the election, and the NDP critic for economic policy, finance, banks, national revenue, public accounts, Crown corporations and electoral reform. He previously served as MP for Yorkton—Melville from 1968 to 1993. Through his 29 years in Parliament, it was the third time he had run for leader, following unsuccessful bids in 1975 and in 1995. Nystrom campaigned heavily on the issue of electoral reform. Other emphases included his parliamentary experience and practical left-wing economics; he had edited a book on financial issues, Just Making Change.

- Endorsements: MP Peter Stoffer
- Date campaign launched: July 31, 2002

=== Joe Comartin ===
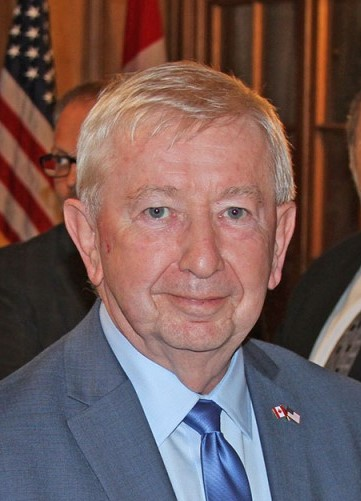
Joe Comartin

Joe Comartin was the MP for Windsor—St. Clair and the party's environment critic at the time of the election. His election in 2000 had been the first federal win for the NDP in Ontario in ten years, and he had helped add a second Ontario seat with Brian Masse's win in the neighbouring riding of Windsor West in 2002. He emphasised foreign affairs, particularly in the Middle East, and his campaign included significant outreach to Arab and Muslim Canadians. Comartin received high profile support from the Canadian Auto Workers. Of the candidates, Comartin was considered the furthest left on economic policy.

- Endorsements: MP Brian Masse, CAW President Buzz Hargrove, CAW Local 444 President Ken Lewenza Sr., former aide to Howard Hampton and publisher Ish Theilheimer
- Date campaign launched: August 13, 2002

=== Pierre Ducasse ===
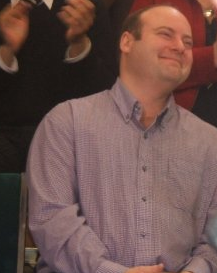
Pierre Ducasse

Pierre Ducasse was the Associate President of the NDP at the time of the election. His underdog campaign stressed outreach in Quebec and building the party toward electoral success. It also drew on Ducasse's background in co-operative economics.

- Endorsements: Ken Georgetti, president of the Canadian Labour Congress

=== Bev Meslo ===
Bev Meslo was a Vancouver-area activist and represented the New Democratic Party Socialist Caucus in the leadership election.

== Results ==
Candidate	Membership Votes	%	Labour Votes	%	Labour Votes Weighted	Total Votes	%	Campaign Contributions	%
Jack Layton	22,453	51.4%	572	59.8%	8,696.9502	31,149.9502	53.5%	$446,472.00	53.8%
Bill Blaikie	10,914	25.0%	227	23.7%	3,451.4121	14,365.4121	24.7%	$195,569.00	23.6%
Lorne Nystrom	4,865	11.1%	35	3.7%	532.1560	5,397.1560	9.3%	$89,684.00	10.8%
Joe Comartin	3,289	7.5%	79	8.3%	1,201.1522	4,490.1522	7.7%	$70,712.00	8.5%
Pierre Ducasse	1,577	3.6%	38	4.0%	577.7694	2,154.7694	3.7%	$18,688.00	2.3%
Bev Meslo	554	1.3%	6	0.6%	91.2268	645.2268	1.1%	$8,815.00	1.1%
Total	43,652	100.0%	957	100.0%	14,550.6667	58,202.6667	100.0%	$829,940.00	100.0%

NOTES:

The labour votes at convention were weighted to equal 1/3 of the total membership votes cast (43,652 / 3 = 14,550.67).

This was done to ensure that labour held 25% of the total votes cast for Leader, as required by the NDP Constitution.

As a result, the vote of each labour delegate was equal to approximately 15.2 membership votes.

Campaign contributions were those reported on the interim financial statements, as of November 30, 2002.
