= Kuśmierczyk =

Kuśmierczyk is a Polish-language surname of two possible origins either the nickname from the literal meaning "apprentice of furrier, or as a diminutive of the name Kuśmierz, e.g., "son of Kuśmierz". Archaic feminine forms: Kuśmierczykowa (by husband) and Kuśmierczykówna (by father) - in modern times, these may be used colloquially. Notable people with the surname include:

- Irek Kusmierczyk (born 1978), Polish-Canadian politician
- Mariusz Kuśmierczyk (born 1971), Polish cardiac surgeon and clinical transplantologist
