= Rick Limoges =

Canadian politician

Richard Limoges

Member of Parliament for Windsor—St. Clair
- In office April 21, 1999 – November 27, 2000
- Preceded by: Shaughnessy Cohen (1998)
- Succeeded by: Joe Comartin

Personal details
- Born: January 1, 1956 (age 70) Windsor, Ontario, Canada
- Party: Liberal

Richard "Rick" Limoges (born January 1, 1956) is a retired Canadian politician, who represented the electoral district of Windsor—St. Clair in the House of Commons of Canada from 1999 to 2000.

Limoges was elected as a councillor for Ward 5 of the City of Windsor in 1985 at the age of 29, at that time the youngest person to have been elected to the municipal council. He was notable for having been one of the first area candidates to use his photo on his campaign signs, featuring his trademark moustache.

Following the death of Windsor—St. Clair MP Shaughnessy Cohen on December 9, 1998, Limoges resigned from the city council to stand as the Liberal Party candidate in the resulting by-election, which was held on April 12, 1999. Limoges won by a margin of just 91 votes over New Democratic Party candidate Joe Comartin.

Limoges was succeeded on Windsor City Council by Eddie Francis, who later became Windsor's mayor.

In the 2000 federal election, however, Comartin defeated Limoges for the seat by a margin of 401 votes. Limoges ran again in the 2004 election, and was defeated by a wider margin of 3,818 votes.

He was a candidate for mayor of Windsor in the 2010 municipal election, received 40% of the popular vote but lost to Francis.

Limoges was a member of the Assessment Review Board of Ontario from 2007 to 2017, co-owner of Sandy's Riverside Grill along with his wife Sandy since August 2005 and majority shareholder, President of River's Edge Tap & Table from January 2015 until April 2020., both restaurants in the Riverside area of Windsor, ON.

He is also co-author of peer reviewed scientific publications, including:

- Jassim S. A. A. and Limoges R. G. 2017. BOOK: Bacteriophages: Practical Applications for Nature's Biocontrol
- Jassim SA, Limoges RG (August 2014). "Natural solution to antibiotic resistance: bacteriophages 'The Living Drugs'". World Journal of Microbiology & Biotechnology. 30 (8): 2153–70. doi:10.1007/s11274-014-1655-7. PMC 4072922. PMID 24781265.
- Jassim SA, Limoges RG (October 2013). "Impact of external forces on cyanophage-host interactions in aquatic ecosystems". World Journal of Microbiology & Biotechnology. 29 (10): 1751–62. doi:10.1007/s11274-013-1358-5. PMID 23619821. S2CID 24177191.
