= Cheryl Hardcastle =

Canadian politician

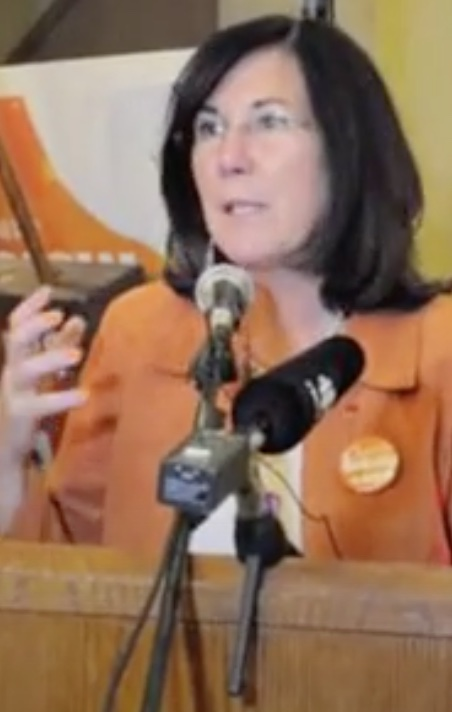
- Hardcastle in 2015

Member of Parliament for Windsor—Tecumseh
- In office October 19, 2015 – October 21, 2019
- Preceded by: Joe Comartin
- Succeeded by: Irek Kusmierczyk

Deputy Mayor of Tecumseh
- In office December 7, 2010 – December 9, 2014
- Preceded by: Tom Burton
- Succeeded by: Joe Bachetti

Personal details
- Born: November 20, 1961 (age 64) Windsor, Ontario, Canada
- Party: New Democratic
- Profession: Newspaper editor

Cheryl Hardcastle is a Canadian politician and former member of Parliament in the House of Commons of Canada for the federal electoral district of Windsor—Tecumseh, first elected during the 2015 Canadian federal election. She is a member of the New Democratic Party. During the 42nd Canadian Parliament, NDP Leader Thomas Mulcair appointed Hardcastle to be the party's critic for Sports and Persons with Disabilities. After Mulcair was replaced Jagmeet Singh, he added "International Human Rights" to her critic duties, where she now sits as Vice-Chair to the Subcommittee for International Human Rights. She lost her re-election bid in the 2019 Canadian federal election, having come second in what was considered a surprise upset to the Liberal candidate Irek Kusmierczyk.

She introduced one private member bill, C-348, which sought to make Employment and Social Development Canada responsible for providing information and guidance to persons with disabilities on all federal applications for grants, benefits, compensation and any other programs and services, as a means of reducing the administrative burden on applicants. The bill was debated at second reading but defeated with the Liberal Party majority voting against it.

== Background ==
Before entering politics, Hardcastle worked for almost 20 years as a reporter and editor of the former Tecumseh Tribune. Prior to becoming an MP, Cheryl earned her reputation as an effective, inclusive leader as Tecumseh's Deputy Mayor from 2011-2014, serving on both Tecumseh Council and Essex County Council. She was also a member of the Essex-Windsor Solid Waste Authority Board and the Essex Region Conservation Authority Board. A past member of Pathway to Potential and National Pension Reform Committee, she has worked to reduce poverty in Windsor-Essex County and to help more Canadians retire with dignity. She has organized minor sports programs and tournaments, serving as Direction of the Tecumseh Baseball club and President for the Sun Parlour Female Hockey Association. She is a founding member of the Tecumseh Area Historical Society and is an instructor and author of beginning-level readers for adults.

She graduated from the University of Windsor with a bachelor's degree in political science and government and a bachelor's degree in communication and media studies.

== Municipal politics ==
As a deputy mayor of Tecumseh, Hardcastle served as chair of the personnel committee, the arts and cultural advisory committee, the Tecumseh heritage advisory committee, the accessibility committee, War of 1812 commemoration committee, the 38th annual Tecumseh Corn Festival committee and the Tecumseh business improvement association.

She served as an Essex County representative on regional authorities:

- Windsor-Essex Poverty Reduction Strategy - Pathway to Potential - Currently working on determining living wage in region and Evaluation and Reporting Working Group.
- Essex Windsor Solid Waste Authority board member since elected and currently Chairperson of the Technical Review Committee dealing with claims for residential properties affected by the closed Maidstone Landfill, in accordance with Ministry of Environment orders.
- Essex Region Conservation Authority board member for two years. In January 2013, she stepped aside to allow another elected representative to have the opportunity to serve on this board, in order to broaden perspectives and strengthen resolve on conservation policies.

== Federal politics ==
During the 42nd Canadian Parliament, NDP Leader Thomas Mulcair appointed Hardcastle to be the party's critic for Sports and Persons with Disabilities. After Mulcair was replaced by Jagmeet Singh, he added "International Human Rights" to her critic duties.

Hardcastle introduced one private member bill, C-348, which sought to make Employment and Social Development Canada responsible for providing information and guidance to persons with disabilities on all federal applications for grants, benefits, compensation and any other programs and services, as a means of reducing the administrative burden on applicants. The bill was debated at second reading but defeated with the Liberal Party Majority voting against it.

She lobbied the government by introducing private member's motion M-56 Canadian with Disabilities Act, m-55 Convention Against Torture, and M-54 Option Protocol to the Convention on the Rights of Persons with Disabilities.

She served a vice-chair of the subcommittee on sports-related concussions, and as vice-chair for the subcommittee on international human rights of the standing committee on foreign affairs and international development. She also served as a member of Canada-United States Inter-Parliamentary Group, Canada-Israel Interparliamentary Group, and Canada Group of the Inter-Parliamentary Union.

== Electoral record ==
=== Federal ===
2021 Canadian federal election: Windsor—Tecumseh
Party	Candidate	Votes	%	±%	Expenditures
Liberal	Irek Kusmierczyk	18,134	31.8	-1.6	$87,942.33
New Democratic	Cheryl Hardcastle	17,465	30.7	-1.6	$84,009.14
Conservative	Kathy Borrelli	14,605	25.6	-2.2	$19,138.69
People's	Victor Green	5,927	10.4	+8.1	none listed
Green	Henry Oulevey	682	1.2	-2.6	$0.00
Marxist–Leninist	Laura Chesnik	164	0.3	±0.0	$0.00
Total valid votes/expense limit		56,977	99.1	–	$112,129.36
Total rejected ballots		500	0.9		
Turnout		57,477	60.9		
Eligible voters		94,424			
Liberal hold		Swing		±0.0	
Source: Elections Canada

2019 Canadian federal election: Windsor—Tecumseh
Party	Candidate	Votes	%	±%	Expenditures
Liberal	Irek Kusmierczyk	19,046	33.44	+6.86	$88,762.63
New Democratic	Cheryl Hardcastle	18,417	32.33	-11.18	$73,796.66
Conservative	Leo Demarce	15,851	27.83	+0.36	$52,162.20
Green	Giovanni Abati	2,177	3.82	+1.86	$4,227.38
People's	Dan Burr	1,279	2.25	-	$4,172.76
Marxist–Leninist	Laura Chesnik	187	0.33	-0.14	none listed
Total valid votes/expense limit		56,957	100.0		
Total rejected ballots		539			
Turnout		57,496			
Eligible voters		95,668			
Liberal gain from New Democratic		Swing		+9.02	
Source: Elections Canada

2015 Canadian federal election: Windsor—Tecumseh
Party	Candidate	Votes	%	±%	Expenditures
New Democratic	Cheryl Hardcastle	23,215	43.5	-6.42	–
Conservative	Jo-Anne Gignac	14,656	27.5	-6.05	–
Liberal	Frank Schiller	14,177	26.6	+13.66	–
Green	David Momotiuk	1,047	2.0	-1.04	–
Marxist–Leninist	Laura Chesnik	249	0.5	-0.04	–
Total valid votes/Expense limit		–	100.0		$225,623.23
Total rejected ballots		–	–	–	
Turnout		–	–	–	
Eligible voters		86,351			
New Democratic hold		Swing		-0.37	
Source: Elections Canada

=== Municipal ===
2014 Tecumseh mayoral election
Mayoral Candidate	Vote	%
Gary McNamara (X)	5,526	56.76
Cheryl Hardcastle	3,868	39.72
Antonello Di Millo	343	3.52

2010 Tecumseh Deputy mayoral election
Mayoral Candidate	Vote	%
Cheryl Hardcastle	4,598	54.86
Tom Burton (X)	3,783	45.14
