= Kathy Borrelli =

Canadian politician

Kathy Borrelli MP
- Borrelli speaking in 2026

Member of Parliament for Windsor—Tecumseh—Lakeshore
- Incumbent
- Assumed office April 28, 2025
- Preceded by: Irek Kusmierczyk

Personal details
- Party: Conservative

Kathy Borrelli is a Canadian politician from the Conservative Party of Canada. She was elected Member of Parliament for Windsor—Tecumseh—Lakeshore in the 2025 Canadian federal election. Borrelli previously ran in the 2021 Canadian federal election, placing third.

Her predecessor, Liberal MP Irek Kusmierczyk sought and obtained a court order for a judicial recount after the Elections Canada validation of election night results reduced the margin of victory from 233 to 77, just 7 short of an automatic 1/1000 votes cast for such a recount. On May 23, 2025, the recount concluded, further reducing Borrelli's margin of victory to just four votes.

== Electoral record ==
2025 Canadian federal election: Windsor—Tecumseh—Lakeshore
Party	Candidate	Votes	%	±%	Expenditures
Conservative	Kathy Borrelli	32,090	45.753	+18.72	
Liberal	Irek Kusmierczyk	32,086	45.747	+14.87	
New Democratic	Alex Ilijoski	4,240	6.05	−24.25	
People's	Nick Babic	828	1.18	−9.11	
Green	Roxanne Tellier	468	0.67	−0.54	
Centrist	Helmi Charif	223	0.32	N/A	
Christian Heritage	Beth St Denis	203	0.29	+0.28	
Total valid votes/expense limit		70,138	99.24		
Total rejected ballots		458	0.76		
Turnout		70,596	66.92		
Eligible voters		105,426			
Conservative notional gain from Liberal		Swing		+1.98	
Source: Elections Canada
Note: This riding's results were subject to a candidate-requested judicial recount on May 9, 2025. Number of eligible voters does not include voting day registrations.

2021 Canadian federal election: Windsor—Tecumseh
Party	Candidate	Votes	%	±%	Expenditures
Liberal	Irek Kusmierczyk	18,134	31.8	-1.6	$87,942.33
New Democratic	Cheryl Hardcastle	17,465	30.7	-1.6	$84,009.14
Conservative	Kathy Borrelli	14,605	25.6	-2.2	$19,138.69
People's	Victor Green	5,927	10.4	+8.1	none listed
Green	Henry Oulevey	682	1.2	-2.6	$0.00
Marxist–Leninist	Laura Chesnik	164	0.3	±0.0	$0.00
Total valid votes/expense limit		56,977	99.1	–	$112,129.36
Total rejected ballots		500	0.9		
Turnout		57,477	60.9		
Eligible voters		94,424			
Liberal hold		Swing		±0.0	
Source: Elections Canada
