= Ruby Cohen =

American politician (1911–1999)

Rubin H. "Ruby" Cohen (March 25, 1911 – February 21, 1999) was an American politician from Connecticut.

Cohen was born in New York City on March 25, 1911, to parents Max and Mollie Levine Cohen. He acquired "Harry's Place", a roadside stand named for its first owner, Harry Shmucker, in 1925. Cohen, a member of the Democratic Party, won his first Connecticut House of Representatives election in 1942, took office in 1943, and served a total of thirty years as a lower house legislator. In 1959, Cohen was elected to lead the appropriations committee within the Connecticut House, and became the first Democratic Party politician to take on the position since 1874. He chaired the committee for over twelve years. Cohen stepped down from the state legislature at the end of his fifteenth term in 1973, and also retired from the management of Harry's Place. Cohen died at the Colchester Nursing & Rehabilitation Center in Colchester, Connecticut, on February 21, 1999, aged 87.

Cohen's property in the town was acquired by the City of Colchester in 2000, and became known as the Ruby and Elizabeth Cohen Woodlands, named for Cohen and his wife.

== Personal life ==
He was Jewish.
