= Howard McCurdy =

Canadian politician (1932–2018)

Howard McCurdy CM OOnt

Member of Parliament for Windsor—St. Clair (Windsor—Walkerville; 1984–1988)
- In office 4 September 1984 – 25 October 1993
- Preceded by: Mark MacGuigan
- Succeeded by: Shaughnessy Cohen

Alderman; Ward 3, Windsor City Council
- In office 10 November 1980 – 24 September 1984
- Preceded by: Don Clarke
- Succeeded by: Mike Patrick

President of the National Black Coalition of Canada
- In office 1969–197?

President of the Windsor Black Coalition
- In office 2003–2005

Personal details
- Born: Howard Douglas McCurdy; 10 December 1932 London, Ontario, Canada
- Died: 20 February 2018 (aged 85) Windsor, Ontario, Canada
- Party: New Democratic Party
- Spouse: Brenda Lee
- Children: 4
- Profession: Biochemist, professor

Howard Douglas McCurdy CM OOnt (10 December 1932 – 20 February 2018) was a Canadian civil rights activist, politician and university professor. He grew up in Southwestern Ontario before moving to the Windsor, Ontario, area. He did his undergraduate work at what is now known as the University of Windsor and doctoral degree at Michigan State University. He became a tenured professor at the University of Windsor and eventually became a department head. In 1980, he entered politics when he was elected to the City of Windsor's council. In 1984, McCurdy entered federal politics when he won a seat in the House of Commons. He was the second Black Canadian to serve in parliament and the first for the New Democratic Party of Canada. He lost his seat during a Liberal Party sweep of Ontario ridings in the 1993 federal election. In 2012 he earned several awards including the Order of Ontario and the Order of Canada. In later life he had many health issues and died in the Windsor-area in 2018.

== Early life ==
McCurdy was born in London, Ontario. His great-great grandfather Nasa McCurdy was an agent on the Underground Railroad by which African-American slaves escaped to Canada in the 19th century.

He moved to Amherstburg, Ontario, when he was 9 and encountered racism for the first time when he tried to join the Cub Scouts and was excluded, being told to form a Black-only troop. He later traced his activism back to his experiences with discrimination at this young age.

== Academic career ==
McCurdy studied at the University of Western Ontario, where he received a Bachelor of Arts, and later at Assumption University, where he received a Bachelor of Science. He was awarded a Master of Science and a Ph.D. in microbiology and chemistry from Michigan State University.

While at Michigan State, McCurdy founded the university's National Association for the Advancement of Colored People (NAACP) chapter and became its first president. In 1962 he founded the Guardian Club a civil rights organization to fight racial discrimination in Windsor. In 1969 he was the co-founder and the first President of the National Black Coalition of Canada.

In 1959, McCurdy joined the Biology Department at Assumption College, which became the University of Windsor (U. of W.) in 1963. After initially being hired as a lecturer, he eventually became the first Canadian-born person of African descent to hold a tenure-track position in a Canadian university. He was the head of the Biology Department from 1973 to 1979. Under his direction, the department grew to include over 1,400 students, 21 full-time faculty members and was the largest department at the university. He more than doubled the department's research grants, and had the highest applied for and received percentage of any biology department in Ontario.

In 1976–80 he founded and was president of the Canadian College of Microbiologists. McCurdy authored more than 50 scientific papers and served on the editorial boards of Bacteriological Reviews and the Canadian Journal of Microbiology. In 1967–68 he was president of the Canadian Association of University Teachers.

== Political career ==
=== Windsor City Council ===
After stepping down as the head of the University of Windsor's Biology Department, he continued teaching there, but decided at the last minute to run for elected office, to build his credibility as a future candidate. On his first try, he was elected as an alderman to Windsor City Council on 10 November 1980. He defeated controversial Ward 3 incumbent alderman, Don Clarke. Clarke got into a physical altercation with another alderman in the council chamber as well as being noted for using foul language at meetings. By making an issue of Clarke's lack of comportment at council meetings, McCurdy was able to defeat him, even though he did not live in Ward 3. McCurdy won re-election on 8 November 1982. McCurdy represented Ward 3 for two terms, the first term was for two years, and the second term was for three years, before going into federal politics. He resigned from City Council on 24 September 1984, with a little over a year left in his term. He only resigned after he was officially declared the winner of the recent federal election for the local electoral district by Elections Canada.

=== Member of Parliament ===
While still serving as an alderman, he became the New Democratic Party's candidate in the 1984 Canadian federal election for the riding of Windsor—Walkerville. Since 1935, the riding was a Liberal Party stronghold or safe seat. Not only did McCurdy win, but the Liberal candidate, Terry Patterson, came in third, behind the Progressive Conservative candidate Tom Porter. With his victory, he became Canada's second Black Member of Parliament (MP) after Lincoln Alexander, and the first Black NDP MP. He ran for re-election in the redistributed riding of Windsor—St. Clair for the 1988 election. He defeated Liberal Party candidate Shaughnessy Cohen.

=== 1989 NDP leadership run ===
When Ed Broadbent stepped down as the federal NDP leader, McCurdy decided to run. The delegated leadership convention was held in Winnipeg from 30 November to 3 December 1989. McCurdy finished fifth on the first ballot and decided drop-off the ballot for the second. He moved his delegates over to fellow Windsor MP, Stephen Langdon, and then decided to eventually endorse Audrey McLaughlin, who would go on to win. McLaughlin lead the NDP to their worst-ever defeat in the 1993 federal election. That weak NDP campaign hurt his re-election chances when he faced-off against Cohen again, and lost.

=== Post-House of Commons Career ===
A tribute celebration in McCurdy's honour was given by the local NDP electoral district association on 5 March 1994. Ontario Premier Bob Rae and some members of his cabinet attended the event, fuelling speculation that McCurdy was going to get a prestigious Ontario appointment. Premier Rae denied such speculation when he talked to the press that evening and none materialized.

In April 1994, the federal NDP was in crisis mode as they were no longer an official party in the House of Commons. The nine-member House of Commons caucus threatened action if Audrey McLaughlin did not step down as the federal leader. McCurdy was a vice-president of the NDP and sat on the party's federal council. McLaughlin agreed to step down as leader within two years and made that public on 19 April 1984. The council asked her to stay on as leader until a new one could be elected. McCurdy was more interested in seeing the party renew itself, than worry about a leadership convention, and supported the idea that she stay on until the renewal process was completed. That autumn, people were encouraging him to challenge for NDP leadership again, but he did not make another attempt.

=== Political comeback attempt ===
McCurdy did attempt to get back into elected politics but at the provincial level in 1995. At the time, the Ontario NDP was the provincial government. However, Premier Rae's Social Contract wage restriction policy, enacted in 1993, was unpopular with labour unions across the province. It restricted wages of public workers and forced them to take unpaid days off known as "Ray Days". This made him and the government targets of labour leaders such as CUPE Ontario's Sid Ryan and the Canadian Auto Workers Union's (CAW) Buzz Hargrove. In April, McCurdy was asked by local Windsor–Essex area labour leaders to denounce the Social Contract, which he refused in a letter he wrote to Windsor and District Labour Council president Gary Parent.

On 12 April 1995, McCurdy announced he would be running for the Ontario NDP nomination in the Windsor—Sandwich electoral district. It was thought he would be unopposed, and a nomination meeting would be held about two weeks later. McCurdy was backed by Premier Rae and the central party already published pamphlets with his name on them.

But it was not going to be an uncontested race as NDP activist, and Social Contract opponent, Arlene Rousseau entered the race. The nomination was moved up from 18 May to 30 April, because the writ was dropped for the 1995 Ontario general election.

McCurdy's nomination team thought he had 80 votes to Rousseau's 58. But about 30 of his supporters stayed home, likely from pressure from the CAW telling members not to support a Rae-endorsed candidate. The unexpected happened, as McCurdy only received 53 votes and was defeated by Rousseau's 58 votes. After publicly congratulating Rousseau, McCurdy met with reporters and said that labour was ""shooting itself in the foot" in order to punish the Rae government for imposing the hated social contract." Prescient words as the Mike Harris-lead Progressive Conservatives won the election, and implemented "The Common Sense Revolution" program that hurt labour's interests with Bill 138, and caused labour unrest with public sector unions.

In 2003, McCurdy supported Bill Blaikie's campaign for NDP leader.

He served as the president of the Windsor Black Coalition from 2003–2005.

== Death ==
In later life, McCurdy was dealing with health issues, including more than one form of cancer. He died on 20 February 2018, at the age of 85 and was survived by his wife Brenda, four children, and 10 grandchildren.

== Awards ==
McCurdy has received many awards, including the Canadian Centennial Medal in 1967, the Queen's Silver Jubilee Medal in 1977, and in 2001 the J. S. Woodsworth Award for Human Rights.

In 2012, McCurdy was made a member of the Order of Ontario. Also in 2012, he received Queen Elizabeth II's Diamond Jubliee Medal. On 19 November 2012, McCurdy was designated a Member of the Order of Canada with investiture into the order occurring on 3 May 2013.
