= Shaughnessy Cohen =

Canadian politician (1948–1998)

Member of Parliament for Windsor—St. Clair
- In office October 25, 1993 – December 9, 1998
- Preceded by: Howard McCurdy
- Succeeded by: Rick Limoges (1999)

Personal details
- Born: Elizabeth Shaughnessy Murray; February 11, 1948 London, Ontario, Canada
- Died: December 9, 1998 (aged 50) Ottawa, Ontario, Canada
- Party: Liberal
- Spouse: Jerry Cohen
- Profession: Lawyer

Elizabeth Shaughnessy Cohen (née Murray; February 11, 1948 – December 9, 1998) was a Canadian politician who represented the riding of Windsor—St. Clair for the Liberal Party of Canada from 1993 until her death in 1998.

== Background ==
She was born in London, Ontario, and grew up in Thamesville. She studied English literature and sociology at the University of Windsor, and taught at St. Clair College before returning to law school. She married Jerry Cohen, a psychology professor, in 1971. She had originally intended to keep her own surname, but opted to take her husband's name when she realized it would make her both Irish and Jewish.

She was called to the Bar of Ontario in 1979, and worked as a lawyer until her election to Parliament.

== Political career ==
=== 1988 and 1993 Federal Elections ===
Cohen stood as the Liberal candidate in Windsor—St. Clair in the 1988 election, but lost to New Democratic Party incumbent Howard McCurdy. However, in the 1993 election, Cohen defeated McCurdy for the seat. Following the election, she was briefly the subject of controversy when she and her husband were sued for $200,000 in unpaid debt, but Cohen blamed the situation on the costs of conducting a political campaign and the controversy soon subsided after she agreed to a debt consolidation plan.

=== Member of Parliament ===
Her first political action after being sworn in as a Member of Parliament was a letter requesting that the federal government building in Windsor be named after former MP Paul Martin, Sr., a request which the government accepted. After the first sitting of the new parliament in January 1994, Cohen was the first newly elected MP to be subjected to a critical profile in Frank, although both Cohen and the Windsor Star criticized the profile's accuracy.

In February 1994, Cohen was appointed to the House of Commons Standing Committee on Human Resources and Development. In June, she was one of several Liberal MPs, alongside Jean Augustine, Barry Campbell, Bill Graham and Hedy Fry, who privately intervened with Ontario Liberal Party leader Lyn McLeod to encourage her not to withdraw the party's support of the Equality Rights Statute Amendment Act (Bill 167). In August, she was appointed co-chair with Herb Gray of a parliamentary subcommittee to investigate allegations against the Canadian Security Intelligence Service, including the role of Grant Bristow as an informant.

On the final day of the 1995 Ontario provincial election campaign, Cohen was one of several MPs, alongside Jane Stewart, Paddy Torsney, Benoît Serré and Stan Dromisky, who made speeches in the federal House of Commons campaigning on behalf of McLeod's Ontario Liberal Party and against the Ontario Progressive Conservative Party of Mike Harris.

In September 1995, she was one of only a few MPs to vote in favour of Réal Ménard's private member's motion calling on the government to recognize same-sex marriage.

In January 1996, she travelled to the Middle East as an election monitor for the Palestinian Authority election. In March, she was appointed to and named as chair of the House of Commons Standing Committee on Justice. In this capacity, she conducted a review of the federal Young Offenders Act, which led to reforms announced by Justice Minister Anne McLellan in 1998.

She was re-elected in the 1997 election by a narrower margin, due to a significant resurgence in support for the New Democratic Party. Her NDP challenger was Joe Comartin. In her second term, she identified one of her key goals as advocating for a crossnational environmental project to clean up pollution in the Detroit River.

=== Death in House of Commons ===
On December 9, 1998, she collapsed in the House of Commons, just minutes after she had stood to address the House. Three MPs, that were doctors, rushed to her desk and performed CPR on her until paramedics took over about ten minutes later. Reform Party MP Grant Hill was one of those doctors, and said she had a pulse when the paramedics rushed her to the hospital. She had suffered a cerebral hemorrhage and was pronounced dead soon afterward at Ottawa Civic Hospital. She was the fifth MP in Canadian history to die on Parliament Hill, and the first ever to suffer a fatal health incident in the House of Commons chamber rather than in her office or on the wider Parliament Hill grounds.

In the House the following day, MPs from all parties spoke in tribute to Cohen. Reform Party MP Randy White praised her personality as "a seemingly impossible combination of vigorous partisanship and open-minded friendship," while New Democratic Party leader Alexa McDonough paid tribute to Cohen's passionate belief in "the pursuit of justice for the rights of those who were not being fully respected." Historian Charlotte Gray, a personal friend of Cohen's, revealed that Cohen had once filled the glass on Paul Martin's House of Commons desk with gin just before a budget speech, while Liberal Party strategist Jerry Yanover described her as "an up-front, in-your-face, old-fashioned Liberal, the kind that had principles and didn't compromise them." Following the speeches, MPs unanimously agreed to immediately adjourn the House for the Christmas holiday, several days earlier than planned.

Her funeral was held December 12, with prime minister Jean Chrétien and almost the entire federal cabinet attending the service. Over 800 people attended the funeral held at St. Anne's Catholic Church in Tecumseh. She was cremated after the church ceremony and her ashes were buried on Pelee Island, Canada's most southern inhabited land. Her gravesite can be found in the municipal cemetery.

Following her death, her widower Jerry Cohen ran for the Liberal nomination in the resulting by-election, but lost to city councillor Rick Limoges. Limoges won the by-election, narrowly defeating the NDP's Comartin by 91 votes, although Comartin defeated Limoges in the 2000 election.

== Legacy ==
In 2000, the Writers' Trust of Canada instituted a literary award, the Shaughnessy Cohen Award for Political Writing, in her memory. Journalist Susan Delacourt published a biography of Cohen, Shaughnessy: The Passionate Politics of Shaughnessy Cohen, the same year.

== Electoral record ==
1988 Canadian federal election
Party	Candidate	Votes
New Democratic Party	Howard McCurdy	18,915
Liberal	Shaughnessy Cohen	16,192
Progressive Conservative	Bruck Easton	8,453

1993 Canadian federal election
Party	Candidate	Votes
Liberal	Shaughnessy Cohen	22,958
New Democratic Party	Howard McCurdy	8,871
Progressive Conservative	Tom Porter	4,553
Reform	Greg Novini	4,153
Green	Stephen Harvey	379
Natural Law	Stephanie Moniatowicz	194
Marxist-Leninist	Dale Woodyard	61
Abolitionist	Ayesha F. Bharmal	52

1997 Canadian federal election
Party	Candidate	Votes
Liberal	Shaughnessy Cohen	16,496
New Democratic Party	Joe Comartin	14,237
Reform	Harold Downs	5,899
Progressive Conservative	Bruck Easton	4,253
Green	Timothy Dugdale	357
Marxist-Leninist	Dale Woodyard	115
