= Elizabeth F. Cohen =

American political scientist

- Education: Swarthmore College; Yale University
- Scientific career
- Fields: Political philosophy; Political science
- Workplaces: Boston University; Syracuse University

Elizabeth F. Cohen is an American political scientist. She is the Maxwell Professor of political science at Boston University. She is a political theorist who studies citizenship, immigration, and value of time in politics.

== Education ==
Cohen attended Swarthmore College, graduating with a B.A. degree in Philosophy and Sociology. She then attended graduate school at Yale University, where she earned an M.A., an M.Phil., and a Ph.D. in political science in 2003.

== Career ==
In 2004, Cohen joined the political science faculty at the Maxwell School of Citizenship and Public Affairs at Syracuse University. In summer 2010 she was a visiting fellow at the Wagner School of Public Service at New York University, and she was a 2014–2015 visiting scholar at the Russell Sage Foundation.

In 2009, Cohen published the book Semi‐citizenship in Democratic Politics. In Semi‐citizenship in Democratic Politics, Cohen studies the idea that people can be only partially citizens, by being granted only some of the rights of citizens. She examines the different types of semi-citizens, splitting their rights into two major categories: autonomous rights, which are useful in any political context, and relative rights, such as the right to property, which are useful only in some political arrangements. Cohen uses this subtler picture of citizenship to challenge the narrative that modern liberal democracies contain one category of partial citizens and another category of full citizens, and that people who have previously been granted only partial citizenship can assemble a collection of rights that will ultimately make them complete citizens; rather, she argues that different citizens have always enjoyed complicated combinations of rights and that there is no one coherent category of total citizenship.

In 2018, Cohen published the book The Political Value of Time: Citizenship, Duration, and Democratic Justice. The Political Value of Time studies how time shapes and is incorporated into politics, like the relationship between space and politics that is studied in the field of political geography. Cohen shows that time is embedded into many of the most fundamental processes in democratic politics, such as the 18 years that it takes for a person to be able to vote in many countries, and the 3 to 5-year span that is a common waiting time for naturalization of new citizens. She studies the difference between these circumstances and ones in which a political status is imposed which will never expire, such as the permanent disfranchisement of some felons, and she compares and evaluates the timespans and deadlines that are attached to various political situations. The Political Value of Time won the Best Book Award for 2019 from the Migration and Citizenship section of the American Political Science Association.

Cohen was also the coauthor of the 2019 book Citizenship with Cyril A. Ghosh. In 2020, Cohen published Illegal: America's Lawless Immigration Regime and How it Threatens Us All. In Illegal Cohen studies United States immigration policy, how it's enforced by agencies like U.S. Customs and Border Protection, the United States Department of Homeland Security, and U.S. Immigration and Customs Enforcement, and how treatment of immigrants interacts with trends like white nationalism in American politics and has implications for the possible treatment of everyone in the country.

In addition to her scholarly writing, Cohen has written op-eds for numerous American newspapers, magazines, and websites. Her work has been discussed in the New York Times by Charles M. Blow, and in New York Magazine. She has also spoken in university and civic settings throughout North America and Western Europe.

Cohen was an Associate Editor of the American Journal of Political Science from 2019 to 2023.

== Selected publications ==
- Elizabeth F. Cohen (2009). Semi-Citizenship in Democratic Politics. Cambridge University Press. ISBN 978-1-1394-8288-2.
- Elizabeth F. Cohen (2018). The Political Value of Time: Citizenship, Duration, and Democratic Justice. Cambridge University Press. ISBN 978-1-1083-2957-6.
- Elizabeth F. Cohen; Cyril Ghosh (2019). Citizenship. Polity Press. ISBN 978-1-5095-2229-3.
- Elizabeth F. Cohen (2020). Illegal: How America's Lawless Immigration Regime Threatens Us All. Basic Books. ISBN 978-1-5416-9985-4.
