= Elizabeth D. A. Cohen =

American physician (1820–1921)

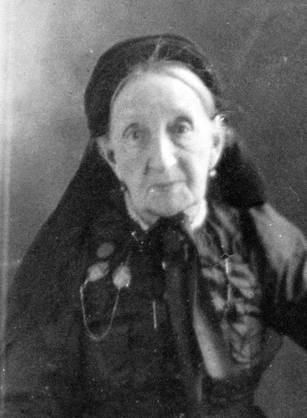
- Born: Elizabeth D. A. Magnus Cohen; February 22, 1820; New York City, United States
- Died: May 28, 1921 (aged 101); New Orleans, Louisiana, United States
- Resting place: Gates of Prayer Cemetery, New Orleans, Louisiana
- Known for: First female physician in Louisiana
- Scientific career
- Fields: Medicine

Elizabeth D. A. Magnus Cohen (February 22, 1820 – May 28, 1921) was the first woman licensed to practice medicine in the U.S. state of Louisiana.

== Early life and education ==
Cohen was born on February 22, 1820, at 205 Hudson Street, New York City, to Phoebe (née Magnus) and David Cohen of England. She later married Dr. Aaron Cohen in New York, with whom she would have five children.

After the death of her first son to measles, ^{[1]} Cohen devoted her life to medicine, citing that more should have been done to save her son. She therefore decided to "become a doctor [herself] and help mothers to keep their little ones well." She challenged the contemporary Jewish stereotype that sons should be the ones who chased professional attainments such as becoming doctors.

=== Medical school ===
In 1853, Cohen enrolled in the Female Medical College of Pennsylvania in Philadelphia.^{[1] [3]} She applied and was accepted into medical school in Philadelphia in 1854 at the Female Medical College of Pennsylvania, which in 1867 was renamed Women's Medical College of Pennsylvania. She graduated in 1857, 5th in her class of 36. Her thesis was titled "Prolapsus Uteri".

== Religion ==
Cohen made no obvious display of Judaism during her life, but her dedication to her faith was made clear in a written statement she made in 1902 to her brother: "I am not sure what I will have in the hereafter, so I am trying to enjoy what is given to me here ... I am ... trying my very best to be good according to my ideas of goodness – that is to live in the fear of God and keeping his ten commandments". Her choice in infirmary following her retirement in 1887 solidified her dedication to Judaism.

== Career and life ==
In 1857, after earning her medical degree, Cohen relocated to join her husband in New Orleans. She immediately gained the attention of the city's medical society and was greeted with enthusiasm. For thirty years from 1857 to 1887, she cared for the people of the French Quarter of New Orleans in a period which was marked by periodic epidemics of yellow fever and smallpox. During the majority of her service, she treated mostly women and children in a private medical practice. She recalled and described it as "attend[ing] to families through generations". She was also quoted as saying "They needed me, when I came here" in a Times-Picayune interview. Despite these achievements, she still faced heavy discrimination and was consequently listed in the city directory as a midwife in 1867. She was then included as a doctoress, in 1869. It was not until the year 1876 when she finally received the title of M.D, as Mrs. Elizabeth Cohen, physician.

She retired from her practice in 1887. During her New Orleans Times-Picayune interview, she recalled having to ask the registrar to add "M.D. after [her] name" while being admitted as a resident of the Touro Infirmary's "Department of the Aged and Infirm" in 1888. During her time there, she volunteered in the sewing and linen room.

In an interview in February 1920 for her 100th birthday, Cohen stated that she was still invested in current events. She was particularly interested in the 19th amendment that was to be implemented later that year, extending American women the right to vote. She was quoted as saying, "I'm glad to see the girls of today getting an education," "In my youth you had to fight for it... And I believe in suffrage, too – things will be better when women can vote and can protect their own property and their own children. Even if I am a hundred, I'm for votes for women."

== Death and legacy ==
Cohen died in New Orleans, Louisiana, on May 28, 1921, at the age of 101.

One of Cohen's former medical offices is located at 1032 Saint Charles Ave, New Orleans on Lee Circle, built in 1883 and was home to the Circle Bar, which is now permanently closed.
