= Ruby and Elizabeth Cohen Woodlands =

Park in Colchester, Connecticut, US

Coordinates: 41.5521°N 72.3027°W

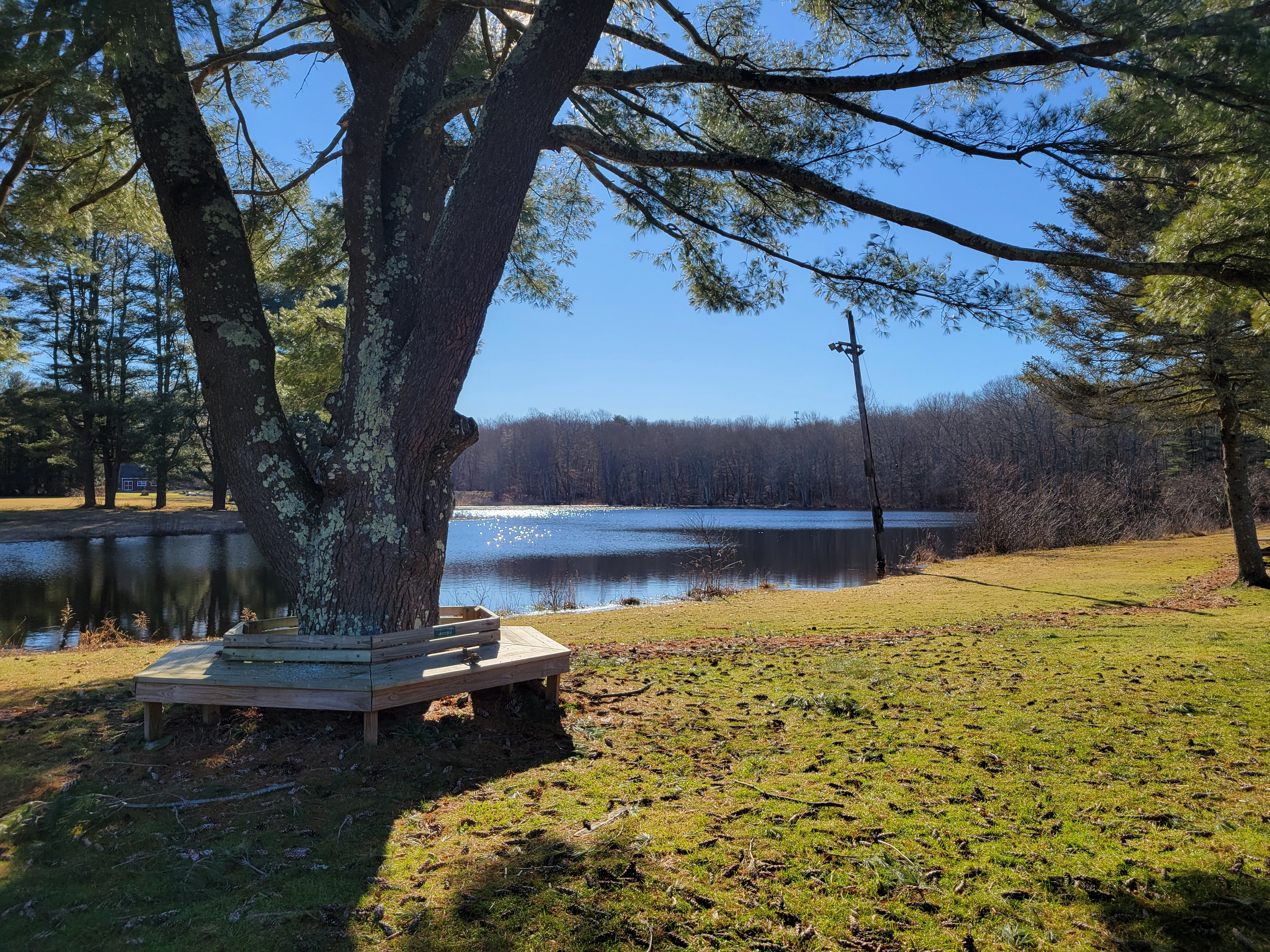
Pond at Ruby and Elizabeth Cohen Woodlands

The Ruby and Elizabeth Cohen Woodlands is a park located on McDonald Road in Colchester, Connecticut. This park consists of 121 acres (0.49 km^{2}) of natural space and includes such facilities as a gazebo, picnic tables, and hiking trails. There are two ponds on the property in addition to marshland.

== History ==
Ruby Cohen was a prominent member of Colchester's society who lived from 1911 to 1999. His significance began when he purchased "Harry's Place" in 1925. To this day, Harry's Place is still a successful roadside burger stand. Harry's Place is on the National Register of Historic Places and is the remnant of seven hotels created by Baron Maurice de Hirsch, financier of the Orient Express. Maurice de Hirsch recognized Colchester's potential as a settlement for Jewish immigrants, which is the reason he opened the hotels. Ruby Cohen retired in 1973. Ruby Cohen's former house is visible from the woodlands and is located across from the gazebo on the opposite side of the pond in the picture below.

Ruby Cohen served in the Connecticut House of Representatives in 1943 and would often serve as a political advisor to the people within his town of Colchester. He would hold court sessions in his barn and open up his woodland preserve to a variety of occasions such as fishing derbies, weddings, and Boy Scout campouts. This preserve has now become the Ruby and Elizabeth Cohen Woodlands under direction of the Colchester Parks and Recreation Department.

== Description and usage ==
The majority of the Ruben and Elizabeth Cohen Woodlands (also called the Ruby Cohen Property) is heavily covered by trees. However many acres consist as grassy open space but are divided by McDonald Road. Two ponds exist on the property, one on either side of the road.

Many students from Bacon Academy (Colchester's high school) use this property as a location to perform a variety of projects. Two projects visible on the property include an information kiosk on invasive species found in the ponds on the property as well as a nature trail detailing the types of trees growing on the property.
