= Elizabeth Cohen (engineer) =

American acoustical engineer

- Education: Stanford University
- Scientific career
- Thesis: The influence of nonharmonic partials on tone perception (1980)

Elizabeth Ann ("Betsy") Cohen is a Brooklyn-born California-based acoustician and engineer for the arts. She is known as a scholar of music perception, digital archiving, and advocate for music therapy.

== Education and career ==
Cohen grew up in Flatbush, Brooklyn where she attended Brooklyn Quaker Friends School. While there, she met Mickey Hart, later a drummer for the Grateful Dead, through a family friend. Cohen received her B.A. in Music and Physics from Bennington College in 1975, where she studied instrument building with Gunnar Schonbeck and composition with Otto Luening. She then worked at Bell Labs for two years before moving to Stanford University where she earned an M.S. degree in Electrical Engineering and Ph.D. in Acoustics. As of 1985, she was an assistant professor at Stanford University, and started her own company to do acoustical engineering. She was a professor of Film and Information studies at the University of California, Los Angeles.

She was selected to serve as the ASA Congressional Science and Engineering Fellow 1993–94 and was assigned to the White House Economic Council where she pioneered Arts and Culture and Humanities outreach on the Internet and also focused on accessibility issues.

In 1996 Cohen was inaugurated as the first female president of the Audio Engineering Society. In 2009 she joined the Academy of Motion Picture Arts and Sciences Technology Council, thereby becoming the first woman to serve in the group.

== Work ==
As an acoustician, Cohen is known for her work on architectural acoustics and pitch perception. She led Cohen Acoustical Inc. for over 25 years providing acoustical design and technology assessment for clients including the Academy of Motion Picture Arts and Sciences, CBS Television, Dolby Laboratories, Fraunhofer Labs, The Grateful Dead, NASA-Ames, Paramount, Sony, and Walt Disney Imagineering. She served for 5 years as the acoustician for the Los Angeles Philharmonic at the Hollywood Bowl and as the lead acoustician for the Joan and Irving Harris Concert Hall in Aspen, Colorado. In the 1990s, Cohen worked to increase the bit rate allotted to sound so as to preserve the quality of sounds shared through the internet. Cohen has collaborated with Nobel Laureate, George Smoot, on outreach efforts to expand student understanding of the role of science and technology in the creative arts. In 2007, Smoot and Cohen attended the Oscars together.

== Awards and honors ==
In 1995, Cohen was elected a fellow of the Acoustical Society of America for "For application of acoustic science to the entertainment industry" and the Audio Engineering Society for "contributions to understanding the acoustics and psychoacoustics of sound in rooms". She was elected as a member of the Academy of Motion Picture Arts and Sciences in 1996 and received the Touchstone Women in Music Award in 1998. In 2001, Cohen was presented with the Audio Engineering Society's Citation Award for "pioneering the technology enabling collaborative multichannel performance over the broadband internet". She was elected a fellow of the Television Academy in 2016.

== Selected publications ==
- Cohen, Elizabeth; Weir, Robert H.; Hasselberger, Jeff (1982-04-01). "The influence of signal processing devices on the timbre perception of electric guitars". The Journal of the Acoustical Society of America. 71 (S1): S26–S27. Bibcode:1982ASAJ...71...26C. doi:10.1121/1.2019303. ISSN 0001-4966.
