= 1989 New Democratic Party leadership election =

Party election in Canada

- November 30 – December 3, 1989
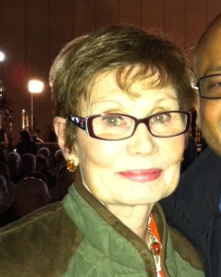

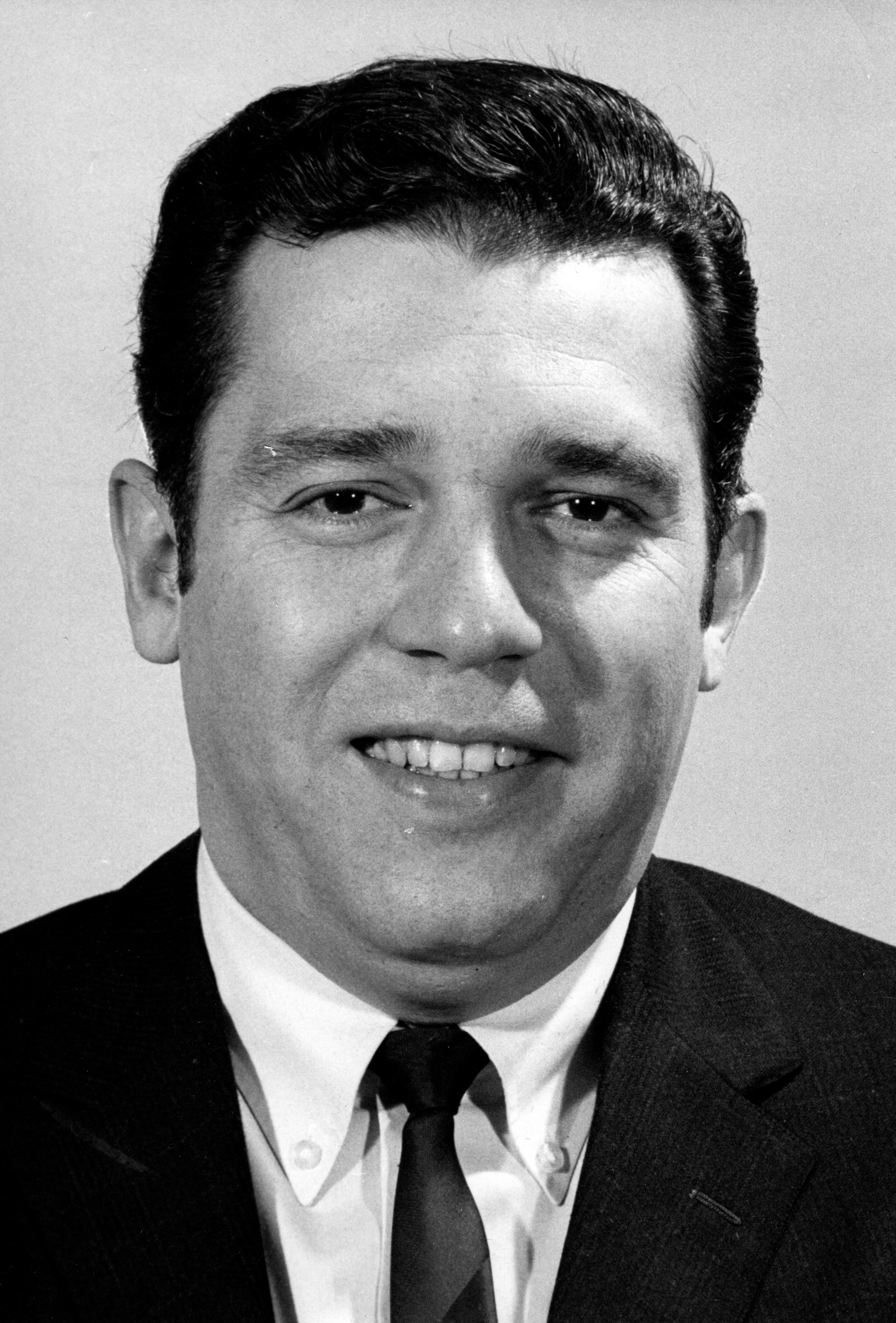
			SL
Candidate	Audrey McLaughlin	Dave Barrett	Steven Langdon
Fourth ballot delegate count	1,316 (55.1%)	1,072 (44.9%)	Eliminated
Third ballot delegate count	1,072 (44.4%)	947 (39.3%)	393 (16.3%)
Second ballot delegate count	829 (34.3%)	780 (32.3%)	519 (21.5%)
First ballot delegate count	646 (26.9%)	566 (23.6%)	351 (14.6%)
Candidate	Simon De Jong	Howard McCurdy
Fourth ballot delegate count	Eliminated	Withdrew
Third ballot delegate count	Eliminated	Withdrew
Second ballot delegate count	289 (12.0%)	Withdrew
First ballot delegate count	315 (13.1%)	256 (10.7%)
Leader before election
Ed Broadbent
Elected Leader
Audrey McLaughlin

1989 New Democratic Party leadership election
- Date: November 30 – December 3, 1989
- Convention: Winnipeg, Manitoba
- Resigning leader: Ed Broadbent
- Won by: Audrey McLaughlin
- Ballots: 4
- Candidates: 7

In 1989, the New Democratic Party held a leadership election to choose a successor to Ed Broadbent. The contest, held from November 30 to December 3 in Winnipeg, Manitoba, was won by Audrey McLaughlin. McLaughlin's victory was the first time a woman won the leadership of a major federal Canadian political party. This convention was followed by six years of decline for the party, culminating in the worst electoral performance of a 20th-century federal democratic socialist party, when the party received only seven percent of the popular vote in the 1993 federal election.

== Prelude ==
Canadians elected a record 43 NDP Members of Parliament (MPs) in the election of 1988. The Liberal Party, however, had reaped most of the benefits of opposing free trade to emerge as the dominant alternative to the Progressive Conservative (PC) government. The PCs' barrage of attacks on the Liberals, and vote-splitting between the NDP and Liberals, helped them win a second consecutive majority. In 1989, Broadbent stepped down after 14 years as federal leader of the NDP.

== Leadership vote ==
At the 1989 Winnipeg leadership convention, former BC Premier Dave Barrett and Audrey McLaughlin were the main contenders for the leadership. During the campaign, Barrett argued that the party should be concerned with western alienation, rather than focusing its attention on Quebec. The Quebec wing of the NDP strongly opposed Barrett's candidacy, with Phil Edmonston, the party's main spokesman in Quebec, threatening to resign from the party if Barrett won.

McLaughlin won the leadership on the fourth ballot, with 1,316 votes for 55 percent of the vote, versus Barrett's 1,072 votes (45 percent). Her victory meant that she became first woman in Canada to lead a major, recognized, federal political party.

Delegate support by ballot
Candidate	1st ballot		2nd ballot		3rd ballot		4th ballot	
Name	Votes cast	%	Votes cast	%	Votes cast	%	Votes cast	%
Audrey McLaughlin	646	26.9%	829	34.3%	1,072	44.4%	1,316	55.1%
Dave Barrett	566	23.6%	780	32.3%	947	39.3%	1,072	44.9%
Steven Langdon	351	14.6%	519	21.5%	393	16.3%		
Simon De Jong	315	13.1%	289	12.0%				
Howard McCurdy	256	10.7%						
Ian Waddell	213	8.9%						
Roger Lagasse	53	2.2%						
Total	2,400	100.0%	2,417	100.0%	2,412	100.0%	2,388	100.0%

== Aftermath ==
The party enjoyed strong support among organized labour and rural voters in the Prairies. McLaughlin tried to expand its support into Quebec without much success. In 1989, the Quebec New Democratic Party adopted a sovereigntist platform and severed its ties with the federal NDP. Under McLaughlin, the party won an election in Quebec for the first time when Edmonston won a 1990 by-election. The party had briefly picked up its first Quebec MP in 1986, when Robert Toupin crossed the floor from the Tories after briefly sitting as an independent. However, he left the party in October 1987 after claiming communists had infiltrated the party.

New Democrats who declined to run.

- Nelson Riis, British Columbia MP
- Jim Fulton, British Columbia MP
- Pauline Jewett, former British Columbia MP
- Ross Harvey, Alberta MP
- Allan Blakeney, former Saskatchewan Premier
- Lorne Nystrom, Saskatchewan MP
- Howard Pawley, former Manitoba Premier
- Stephen Lewis, former Ontario NDP Leader
- Michael Cassidy, former MP, former Ontario NDP leader
- Bob Rae, Ontario NDP Leader, former MP
- Lynn McDonald, Former Ontario MP
- Marion Dewar, Former Ontario MP, former Ottawa Mayor
- John Rodriguez, Ontario MP
- Bob White, President Canadian Auto Workers
- Ian Deans, former Ontario MP
- Rémy Trudel, 1988 Quebec NDP candidate
- Phil Edmonston, soon to be Quebec MP, consumer advocate
- Nancy Riche, Union Leader
- Alexa McDonough, Nova Scotia NDP leader
- Jack Harris, Former Newfoundland MP
- Tony Penikett, Yukon Government Leader
