= Mark MacGuigan =

Canadian politician (1931–1998)

The Honourable Mark MacGuigan PC

Minister of Justice Attorney General of Canada
- In office 10 September 1982 – 29 June 1984
- Prime Minister: Pierre Trudeau
- Preceded by: Jean Chrétien
- Succeeded by: Donald Johnston

Secretary of State for External Affairs
- In office 3 March 1980 – 9 September 1982
- Prime Minister: Pierre Trudeau
- Preceded by: Flora MacDonald
- Succeeded by: Allan MacEachen

Member of Parliament for Windsor-Walkerville
- In office 25 June 1968 – 29 June 1984
- Preceded by: Riding created
- Succeeded by: Howard McCurdy

Personal details
- Born: Mark Rudolph MacGuigan; 17 February 1931 Charlottetown, Prince Edward Island, Canada
- Died: 12 January 1998 (aged 66) Oklahoma City, Oklahoma, U.S.
- Party: Liberal
- Parent(s): Mark Rudolph MacGuigan, Sr. (father); Agnes Violet Trainor (mother)
- Education: Saint Dunstan's University (BA); The University of Toronto (MA, PhD); Osgoode Hall Law School (LLB); Columbia University (LLM, JSD)
- Profession: Professor of Law; Lawyer; Judge

Mark Rudolph MacGuigan PC (17 February 1931 – 12 January 1998) was a Canadian academic and politician.

Born in Charlottetown, Prince Edward Island, the son of Mark Rudolph MacGuigan and Agnes Violet Trainor, he was educated at Saint Dunstan's University (B.A.), the University of Toronto (M.A., Ph.D. (Philosophy)), Osgoode Hall Law School (LL.B.), and Columbia University (LL.M., J.S.D.) He was a professor at Osgoode and the University of Toronto and was dean of law at the University of Windsor.

MacGuigan was elected as a Liberal Party candidate to the House of Commons of Canada in the 1968 general election. He was re-elected in 1972, 1974, 1979, and 1980.

In 1976, he took a turn at provincial politics and ran for the leadership of the Ontario Liberal Party. He lost to Stuart Smith at the leadership convention.

In 1980, he was appointed Secretary of State for External Affairs in the cabinet of Prime Minister Pierre Trudeau. He became Minister of Justice and Attorney General of Canada in 1982.

When Trudeau announced his retirement as Liberal leader and prime minister, MacGuigan ran to succeed him at the 1984 Liberal leadership convention. He placed fifth. He retired from politics following the convention, and became a judge on the federal Court of Appeal.

He died in Oklahoma City of liver cancer in 1998.
