= Irek Kusmierczyk =

Canadian politician (born 1978)

Member of Parliament for Windsor—Tecumseh
- In office October 21, 2019 – April 28, 2025
- Preceded by: Cheryl Hardcastle
- Succeeded by: Kathy Borrelli

Windsor City Councillor for Ward 7
- In office December 1, 2014 – October 30, 2019
- Preceded by: Percy Hatfield
- Succeeded by: Jeewen Gill

Personal details
- Born: January 16, 1978 (age 48) Kraśnik, Lublin Voivodeship, Polish People's Republic
- Party: Liberal
- Spouse: Shauna Carter

Irek Kusmierczyk (born January 16, 1978) is a Polish-Canadian politician who was elected to represent the riding of Windsor—Tecumseh in the House of Commons of Canada in the 2019 Canadian federal election. Prior to his election in the House of Commons, he was a city councillor for the Windsor City Council representing Ward 7.

He received his PhD in political science from Vanderbilt University, an MA in Central and Eastern European Studies from Jagiellonian University an MSc in government from the London School of Economics, and a Bachelor of Journalism from Carleton University. He worked in government at the Ministry of Foreign Affairs as an Atlantic Council of Canada Fellow and published a book chapter on cross-border environmental cooperation between local governments around the Great Lakes basin. He worked on Species-at-Risk remediation around Ojibway Park as part of the Windsor Essex Parkway Project.

Kusmierczyk was born in Kraśnik, Poland, the son of Richard Kusmierczyk. His family arrived in Canada in 1983 as political refugees after his father was imprisoned as a member of the Solidarity movement, which opposed the communist dictatorship and established the first free and independent trade union in communist Eastern Europe. They immediately settled in Windsor where his father worked as an engineer in the automotive industry.

In the 2025 Canadian federal election, he was unseated in Windsor—Tecumseh—Lakeshore by Conservative candidate Kathy Borrelli. After an initial Elections Canada validation reduced the loss from 233 votes to 77 – 7 short of the automatic 1/1000 votes cast judicial recount threshold – Kusmiercyk sought and obtained an order for such a recount to be held. On May 23, the recount concluded, affirming Borrelli's victory, but reducing the margin of victory to four votes.

== Electoral record ==
=== Federal ===
2025 Canadian federal election: Windsor—Tecumseh—Lakeshore
Party	Candidate	Votes	%	±%	Expenditures
Conservative	Kathy Borrelli	32,090	45.753	+18.72	
Liberal	Irek Kusmierczyk	32,086	45.747	+14.87	
New Democratic	Alex Ilijoski	4,240	6.05	−24.25	
People's	Nick Babic	828	1.18	−9.11	
Green	Roxanne Tellier	468	0.67	−0.54	
Centrist	Helmi Charif	223	0.32	N/A	
Christian Heritage	Beth St Denis	203	0.29	+0.28	
Total valid votes/expense limit		70,138	99.24		
Total rejected ballots		458	0.76		
Turnout		70,596	66.92		
Eligible voters		105,426			
Conservative notional gain from Liberal		Swing		+1.98	
Source: Elections Canada
Note: This riding's results were subject to a candidate-requested judicial recount on May 9, 2025. Number of eligible voters does not include voting day registrations.

2021 Canadian federal election: Windsor—Tecumseh
Party	Candidate	Votes	%	±%	Expenditures
Liberal	Irek Kusmierczyk	18,134	31.8	-1.6	$87,942.33
New Democratic	Cheryl Hardcastle	17,465	30.7	-1.6	$84,009.14
Conservative	Kathy Borrelli	14,605	25.6	-2.2	$19,138.69
People's	Victor Green	5,927	10.4	+8.1	none listed
Green	Henry Oulevey	682	1.2	-2.6	$0.00
Marxist–Leninist	Laura Chesnik	164	0.3	±0.0	$0.00
Total valid votes/expense limit		56,977	99.1	–	$112,129.36
Total rejected ballots		500	0.9		
Turnout		57,477	60.9		
Eligible voters		94,424			
Liberal hold		Swing		±0.0	
Source: Elections Canada

2019 Canadian federal election: Windsor—Tecumseh
Party	Candidate	Votes	%	±%	Expenditures
Liberal	Irek Kusmierczyk	19,046	33.44	+6.86	$88,762.63
New Democratic	Cheryl Hardcastle	18,417	32.33	-11.18	$73,796.66
Conservative	Leo Demarce	15,851	27.83	+0.36	$52,162.20
Green	Giovanni Abati	2,177	3.82	+1.86	$4,227.38
People's	Dan Burr	1,279	2.25	-	$4,172.76
Marxist–Leninist	Laura Chesnik	187	0.33	-0.14	none listed
Total valid votes/expense limit		56,957	100.0		
Total rejected ballots		539			
Turnout		57,496			
Eligible voters		95,668			
Liberal gain from New Democratic		Swing		+9.02	
Source: Elections Canada

2011 Canadian federal election
Party	Candidate	Votes	%	±%	Expenditures
New Democratic	Joe Comartin	22,235	49.92	+1.22	$72,370
Conservative	Denise Ghanam	14,945	33.55	+9.63	–
Liberal	Irek Kusmierczyk	5,764	12.94	-8.02	–
Green	Kyle Prestanski	1,354	3.04	-3.36	–
Marxist–Leninist	Laura Chesnik	242	0.54	–	–
Total valid votes/Expense limit		44,540	100.00		
Total rejected ballots		232	0.52	-0.06	
Turnout		44,772	53.46	+ 2.81	
Eligible voters		83,748	–	–	

=== Municipal ===
2018 Ward 7, Windsor municipal election
Council Candidate	Vote	%
Irek Kusmierczyk	4,745	69.85
Angelo Marignani	982	14.46
Barbara Holland	658	9.69
Albert Saba	408	6.01

2014 Ward 7, Windsor municipal election
Council Candidate	Vote	%
Irek Kusmierczyk	3,761	50.76
Angelo Marignani	2,539	34.27
Daniel William Speal	909	12.27
Jeffery Kocsis	200	2.70

2013 Ward 7, Windsor municipal by-election
Council Candidate	Vote	%
Irek Kusmierczyk	1,140	31.39
Angelo Marignani	1,088	29.87
Tom Wilson	639	17.55
Robin L. Fortier	262	7.19
Tosin Bello	231	6.34
Laurie Komon	112	3.08
Steve Gavrilidis	67	1.84
Steve Farrell	40	1.10
Ernie the Baconman	33	0.91
Mitchell Bialkowski	21	0.58
Clint Weir	9	0.25
