= Windsor—Tecumseh—Lakeshore =

Federal electoral district in Ontario, Canada

Coordinates: 42.293°N 82.900°W

Ontario electoral district
- Interactive map of riding boundaries from the 2025 federal election

Federal electoral district
- Legislature: House of Commons
MP
Kathy Borrelli
Conservative
- District created: 2003
- First contested: 2004
- Last contested: 2025
- District webpage: profile, map

Demographics
- Population (2021): 122,798
- Electors (2021): 94,424
- Area (km²): 163.02
- Pop. density (per km²): 753.3
- Census division: Essex
- Census subdivision(s): Windsor (part), Lakeshore (part), Tecumseh

Windsor—Tecumseh—Lakeshore (formerly Windsor—Tecumseh) is a federal electoral district in Ontario, Canada, that has been represented in the House of Commons of Canada since 2004.

== Geography ==
Ontario 2018 Windsor-Tecumseh.

Windsor—Tecumseh consists of the Town of Tecumseh, and the part of the City of Windsor lying east and north of a line drawn from the U.S. border southeast along Langlois Avenue, east along Tecumseh Road East, and southeast along Pillette Road to the southern city limit.

== History ==
Windsor—St. Clair was created in 1987 as "Windsor—Lake St. Clair" from parts of Essex—Windsor and Windsor—Walkerville ridings. In 1989, the riding's name was changed to "Windsor—St. Clair". It was also a provincial riding for the 1999 and 2003 Ontario provincial elections.

Windsor—Tecumseh was created in 2003 from parts of Essex and Windsor—St. Clair ridings.

This riding was left unchanged after the 2012 electoral redistribution.

Following the 2022 Canadian federal electoral redistribution, this riding has been renamed Windsor—Tecumseh—Lakeshore, first used in the April 2025 election. The riding gained the part of Lakeshore north of the 401 and west of the Puce River (Pike Creek and Elmstead areas) from Essex.

== Demographics ==
According to the 2021 Canadian census

Ethnic groups: 75.9% White, 5.4% Arab, 4.6% Black, 3.2% South Asian, 3.1% Aboriginal, 1.7% West Asian, 1.4% Filipino, 1.4% Latin American, 1.2% Chinese
Languages: 72.2% English, 4% Arabic, 2.6% French, 2.2% Serbo-Croatian, 1.8% Italian, 1.5% Chaldean Neo-Aramaic, 1.3% Serbian, 1.2% Spanish, 1% Polish
Religions: 65.1% Christian (39.6% Catholic, 4.3% Eastern Orthodox, 3.6% Anglican, 2.5% United Church, 1.4% Baptist, 1.4% Pentecostal and other Charismatic, 1% Presbyterian), 27.1 No religion, 4.6% Muslim, 1.3 Hindu
Median income (2020): $40,400

== Members of Parliament ==
Parliament	Years	Member	Party
Windsor—Lake St. Clair; Riding created from Essex—Windsor and Windsor—Walkerville
34th	1988–1993	Howard McCurdy	New Democratic
Windsor—St. Clair
35th	1993–1997	Shaughnessy Cohen	Liberal
36th	1997–1999	Shaughnessy Cohen	Liberal
36th	1999–2000	Rick Limoges	Liberal
37th	2000–2004	Joe Comartin	New Democratic
Windsor—Tecumseh
38th	2004–2006	Joe Comartin	New Democratic
39th	2006–2008	Joe Comartin	New Democratic
40th	2008–2011	Joe Comartin	New Democratic
41st	2011–2015	Joe Comartin	New Democratic
42nd	2015–2019	Cheryl Hardcastle	New Democratic
43rd	2019–2021	Irek Kusmierczyk	Liberal
44th	2021–2025	Irek Kusmierczyk	Liberal
Windsor—Tecumseh—Lakeshore
45th	2025–present	Kathy Borrelli	Conservative

== Election results ==
Graph of election results in Windsor—Tecumseh (minor parties that never got 2% of the vote or didn't run consistently are omitted) View source data.

=== Windsor—Tecumseh—Lakeshore ===
2025 Canadian federal election
Party	Candidate	Votes	%	±%	Expenditures
Conservative	Kathy Borrelli	32,090	45.753	+18.72	
Liberal	Irek Kusmierczyk	32,086	45.747	+14.87	
New Democratic	Alex Ilijoski	4,240	6.05	−24.25	
People's	Nick Babic	828	1.18	−9.11	
Green	Roxanne Tellier	468	0.67	−0.54	
Centrist	Helmi Charif	223	0.32	N/A	
Christian Heritage	Beth St Denis	203	0.29	+0.28	
Total valid votes/expense limit		70,138	99.24		
Total rejected ballots		458	0.76		
Turnout		70,596	66.92		
Eligible voters		105,426			
Conservative notional gain from Liberal		Swing		+1.98	
Source: Elections Canada
Note: This riding's results were subject to a candidate-requested judicial recount on May 9, 2025. Number of eligible voters does not include voting day registrations.

2021 federal election redistributed results
Party	Vote	%
Liberal	19,019	30.88
New Democratic	18,660	30.30
Conservative	16,650	27.03
People's	6,339	10.29
Green	744	1.21
Others	181	0.29

=== Windsor—Tecumseh ===
2021 Canadian federal election: Windsor—Tecumseh
Party	Candidate	Votes	%	±%	Expenditures
Liberal	Irek Kusmierczyk	18,134	31.8	-1.6	$87,942.33
New Democratic	Cheryl Hardcastle	17,465	30.7	-1.6	$84,009.14
Conservative	Kathy Borrelli	14,605	25.6	-2.2	$19,138.69
People's	Victor Green	5,927	10.4	+8.1	none listed
Green	Henry Oulevey	682	1.2	-2.6	$0.00
Marxist–Leninist	Laura Chesnik	164	0.3	±0.0	$0.00
Total valid votes/expense limit		56,977	99.1	–	$112,129.36
Total rejected ballots		500	0.9		
Turnout		57,477	60.9		
Eligible voters		94,424			
Liberal hold		Swing		±0.0	
Source: Elections Canada

2019 Canadian federal election: Windsor—Tecumseh
Party	Candidate	Votes	%	±%	Expenditures
Liberal	Irek Kusmierczyk	19,046	33.44	+6.86	$88,762.63
New Democratic	Cheryl Hardcastle	18,417	32.33	-11.18	$73,796.66
Conservative	Leo Demarce	15,851	27.83	+0.36	$52,162.20
Green	Giovanni Abati	2,177	3.82	+1.86	$4,227.38
People's	Dan Burr	1,279	2.25	-	$4,172.76
Marxist–Leninist	Laura Chesnik	187	0.33	-0.14	none listed
Total valid votes/expense limit		56,957	100.0		
Total rejected ballots		539			
Turnout		57,496			
Eligible voters		95,668			
Liberal gain from New Democratic		Swing		+9.02	
Source: Elections Canada

2015 Canadian federal election
Party	Candidate	Votes	%	±%	Expenditures
New Democratic	Cheryl Hardcastle	23,215	43.52	-6.4	$65,250.45
Conservative	Jo-Anne Gignac	14,656	27.47	-6.08	$158,331.11
Liberal	Frank Schiller	14,177	26.58	+13.64	$40,870.68
Green	David Momotiuk	1,047	1.96	-1.08	–
Marxist–Leninist	Laura Chesnik	249	0.47	-0.07	–
Total valid votes/Expense limit		53,344	100.0		$226,117.46
Total rejected ballots		209	–	–	
Turnout		53,553	–	–	
Eligible voters		87,644			
New Democratic hold		Swing		-0.37	
Source: Elections Canada

2011 Canadian federal election
Party	Candidate	Votes	%	±%	Expenditures
New Democratic	Joe Comartin	22,235	49.92	+1.22	$72,370
Conservative	Denise Ghanam	14,945	33.55	+9.63	–
Liberal	Irek Kusmierczyk	5,764	12.94	-8.02	–
Green	Kyle Prestanski	1,354	3.04	-3.36	–
Marxist–Leninist	Laura Chesnik	242	0.54	–	–
Total valid votes/Expense limit		44,540	100.00		
Total rejected ballots		232	0.52	-0.06	
Turnout		44,772	53.46	+ 2.81	
Eligible voters		83,748	–	–	

2008 Canadian federal election
Party	Candidate	Votes	%	±%	Expenditures
New Democratic	Joe Comartin	20,914	48.70	+4.08	$67,619
Conservative	Denise Ghanam	10,276	23.92	-1.40	$15,626
Liberal	Steve Mastroianni	9,005	20.96	-5.47	$49,645
Green	Kyle Prestanski	2,749	6.40	+3.17	
Total valid votes/Expense limit		42,944	100.00		$88,944
Total rejected ballots		252	0.58	+0.07	
Turnout		43,196	50.65	-9.56	
New Democratic Party hold		Swing	+2.74		

2006 Canadian federal election
Party	Candidate	Votes	%	±%
New Democratic	Joe Comartin	22,646	44.62	+2.77
Liberal	Bruck Easton	13,412	26.43	-8.44
Conservative	Rick Fuschi	12,852	25.32	+4.80
Green	Catherine Pluard	1,644	3.23	-0.13
Marxist–Leninist	Laura Chesnik	193	0.38	0.00
Total valid votes		50,747	100.00	
Total rejected ballots		261	0.51	-0.24
Turnout		51,008	60.21	+2.63

2004 Canadian federal election
Party	Candidate	Votes	%
New Democratic	Joe Comartin	20,037	41.85
Liberal	Rick Limoges	16,219	33.87
Conservative	Rick Fuschi	9,827	20.52
Green	Elizabeth Powles	1,613	3.36
Marxist–Leninist	Laura Chesnik	182	0.38
Total valid votes		47,878	100.00
Total rejected ballots		362	0.75
Turnout		48,240	57.58

=== Windsor—St. Clair ===
2000 Canadian federal election
Party	Candidate	Votes	%	±%
New Democratic	Joe Comartin	17,001	40.84	-2.52
Liberal	Rick Limoges	16,600	39.87	-3.78
Alliance	Philip Pettinato	5,639	13.55	+7.40
Progressive Conservative	Bruck Easton	1,906	4.58	-1.96
Green	Stephen Lockwood	390	0.94	
Marxist–Leninist	Dale Woodyard	95	0.23	

Canadian federal by-election, April 12, 1999: Windsor—St. Clair Death of Shaughnessy Cohen
Party	Candidate	Votes	%	±%
Liberal	Rick Limoges	13,891	43.65	+3.76
New Democratic	Joe Comartin	13,800	43.36	+8.94
Progressive Conservative	Bruck Easton	2,074	6.52	-3.76
Reform	San Cowan	1,956	6.15	-8.11
Unknown	John Turmel	106	0.33	

1997 Canadian federal election
Party	Candidate	Votes	%	±%
Liberal	Shaughnessy Cohen	16,496	39.89	-15.94
New Democratic	Joe Comartin	14,237	34.42	+12.85
Reform	Harold Downs	5,899	14.26	+4.16
Progressive Conservative	Bruck Easton	4,253	10.28	-0.79
Green	Timothy Dugdale	357	0.86	-0.06
Marxist–Leninist	Dale Woodyard	115	0.28	+0.13

1993 Canadian federal election
Party	Candidate	Votes	%	±%
Liberal	Shaughenessy Cohen	22,958	55.83	+12.41
New Democratic	Howard McCurdy	8,871	21.57	-15.60
Progressive Conservative	Tim Porter	4.553	11.07	-8.34
Reform	Greg Novini	4,153	10.10	
Green	Steven Harvey	379	0.92	
Natural Law	Stephanie Moniatowicz	194	0.47	
Marxist–Leninist	Dale Woodyard	61	0.15	
Abolitionist	Ayesha F. Bharmal	52	0.13	

=== Windsor—Lake St. Clair ===
1988 Canadian federal election
Party	Candidate	Votes	%
New Democratic Party	Howard McCurdy	18,915	43.42
Liberal	Shaughnessy Cohen	16,192	37.17
Progressive Conservative	Bruck Easton	8,453	19.41

== See also ==
- List of Canadian electoral districts
- Historical federal electoral districts of Canada
