= Windsor—Walkerville (federal electoral district) =

Former federal electoral district in Ontario, Canada

Ontario electoral district

Defunct federal electoral district
- Legislature: House of Commons
- District created: 1966
- District abolished: 1987
- First contested: 1968
- Last contested: 1984

Windsor—Walkerville was a federal electoral district that was represented in the House of Commons of Canada from 1968 to 1988. It was located in the southwest corner of the province of Ontario. This riding was created in 1966 from parts of Essex East and Essex West ridings. The electoral district was abolished in 1987 when it was merged into Windsor—Lake St. Clair riding, which was later renamed Windsor—St. Clair.

Windsor—Walkerville initially consisted of the Town of Tecumseh, the Village of St. Clair Beach and the eastern part of the City of Windsor (including Peche Island). In 1976, the Windsor portion was redefined.

== Members of Parliament ==
This riding has elected the following members of Parliament:

Parliament	Years	Member	Party
Riding created from Essex East and Essex West
28th	1968–1972	Mark MacGuigan	Liberal
29th	1972–1974	Mark MacGuigan	Liberal
30th	1974–1979	Mark MacGuigan	Liberal
31st	1979–1980	Mark MacGuigan	Liberal
32nd	1980–1984	Mark MacGuigan	Liberal
33rd	1984–1988	Howard McCurdy	New Democratic
Riding dissolved into Windsor—Lake St. Clair

== Election results ==
1968 Canadian federal election
Party	Candidate	Votes
Liberal	Mark MacGuigan	17,090
New Democratic	Bert Weeks	12,090
Progressive Conservative	David Alexander Gray	5,191
Communist	Bruce Magnuson	408

1972 Canadian federal election
Party	Candidate	Votes
Liberal	Mark MacGuigan	17,298
New Democratic	Fred Alexander	14,662
Progressive Conservative	Richard C. Quittenton	7,208
Communist	Edward McDonald	317

1974 Canadian federal election
Party	Candidate	Votes
Liberal	Mark MacGuigan	19,009
New Democratic	Fred Alexander	13,825
Progressive Conservative	Tony Soda	6,752
Communist	Elizabeth Rowley	165
Marxist–Leninist	Peter Ewart	90

1979 Canadian federal election
Party	Candidate	Votes
Liberal	Mark MacGuigan	17,561
New Democratic	David Burr	15,744
Progressive Conservative	Charlie Pingle	7,265
Communist	Margaret Longmoore	165
Marxist–Leninist	Don Bonner	108

1980 Canadian federal election
Party	Candidate	Votes
Liberal	Mark MacGuigan	20,869
New Democratic	John Moynahan	14,460
Progressive Conservative	Charlie Pingle	4,581
Communist	Margaret Longmoore	142
Marxist–Leninist	Donald Bonner	67

1984 Canadian federal election
Party	Candidate	Votes
New Democratic	Howard McCurdy	14,604
Progressive Conservative	Tom Porter	13,546
Liberal	Terrance Patterson	11,574

== See also ==
- List of Canadian electoral districts
- Historical federal electoral districts of Canada
