= Canadian federal election results in Southwestern Ontario =

Seats obtained by party
Liberal
Conservative
New Democratic
Progressive Conservative (defunct)
Progressive (defunct)

This page lists results of Canadian federal elections in Southwestern Ontario.

== Regional profile ==
Beginning at the start of the 1960s, Southwestern Ontario has traditionally given more support to the Liberals, aside from 1984, although there has always been a pronounced urban-rural split: the New Democrats (NDP) and Liberals are both stronger in Windsor and London, while the rural areas and Sarnia have leaned more towards the Conservatives due to their social conservative bent. The Liberals swept all the ridings in the region in 1993, 1997 and 2000, save one NDP win in 2000.

However, in the 2004, 2006, 2008 and 2011 elections, the entire region, incrementally swung away from the Liberals to support the Conservatives, including in London, where three-way vote-splitting resulted in two ridings switching from Liberal to Conservative. The loss of the second one, London North Centre, in the 2011 election, left the Liberals without any seats in Southwestern Ontario for the first time since Confederation. The exception to Conservative swing was in one London riding, London-Fanshawe, and in Windsor's two ridings, which remained with the NDP from 2006 right through the 2015 election.

In 2015, Southwestern Ontario's election results did not at all mirror the overall federal election results. The Liberals managed to take back two seats in the entire Region, both in London, but the NDP added a seat adjacent to Windsor, Essex, and the Conservatives retained four seats, three rural and also Sarnia-Lambton. The 2019 election saw the NDP lose two of the three Windsor area seats it held before the election, with one of each going to the Conservatives and the Liberals. This election also saw increased regional polarization, with all seats in urban London and Windsor being won by the Liberals or the NDP, and all other seats being won by the Conservatives.

=== Votes by party throughout time ===
Election	Liberal	Conservative	New Democratic	Green	People's	PC	Reform / Alliance	Others
1979	174,830; 40.0%	—N/a	101,849; 23.3%	—N/a	—N/a	159,609; 36.5%	—N/a	933; 0.2%
1980	203,740; 46.7%	—N/a	98,687; 22.6%	—N/a	—N/a	132,159; 30.3%	—N/a	953; 0.2%
1984	136,208; 29.9%	—N/a	104,223; 22.9%	—N/a	—N/a	214,843; 47.1%	—N/a	141; 0.0%
1988	198,455; 40.2%	—N/a	121,679; 24.6%	—N/a	—N/a	164,980; 33.4%	—N/a	7,994; 1.6%
1993	266,349; 54.6%	—N/a	42,763; 8.8%	1,918; 0.4%	—N/a	81,334; 16.7%	83,538; 17.1%	12,129; 2.5%
1997	209,513; 47.6%	—N/a	68,895; 15.6%	3,434; 0.8%	—N/a	65,717; 14.9%	84,454; 19.2%	8,343; 1.9%
2000	201,859; 48.3%	—N/a	50,285; 12.0%	3,686; 0.9%	—N/a	47,883; 11.5%	110,620; 26.5%	3,190; 0.8%
2004	182,852; 38.4%	149,902; 31.5%	116,361; 24.4%	20,020; 4.2%	—N/a	—N/a	—N/a	5,974; 1.3%
2006	170,565; 32.1%	189,968; 35.8%	143,392; 27.0%	21,076; 4.0%	—N/a	—N/a	—N/a	4,217; 0.8%
2008	125,074; 26.6%	183,406; 39.0%	124,325; 26.5%	33,665; 7.2%	—N/a	—N/a	—N/a	2,811; 0.6%
2011	85,083; 17.4%	222,451; 45.4%	164,202; 33.5%	14,774; 3.0%	—N/a	—N/a	—N/a	2,656; 0.5%
2015	188,904; 33.1%	205,474; 36.0%	158,586; 27.8%	15,734; 2.8%	—N/a	—N/a	—N/a	2,245; 0.4%
2019	181,782; 30.3%	216,455; 36.1%	156,845; 26.1%	28,903; 4.8%	12,731; 2.1%	—N/a	—N/a	2,481; 0.4%
2021	154,118; 26.1%	213,039; 36.1%	157,279; 26.7%	6,981; 1.2%	56,188; 9.5%	—N/a	—N/a	2,207; 0.4%
2025	276,656; 41.4%	315,658; 47.2%	61,648; 9.2%	3,663; 0.5%	7,542; 1.1%	—N/a	—N/a	3,000; 0.4%

Liberal Conservative New Democratic Green People's	Progressive Conservative (defunct) Alliance (defunct) Reform (defunct)

== 2021 ==
Electoral district	Candidates						Incumbent
Electoral district	Liberal	Conservative	NDP	Green	PPC	Other	Incumbent
Chatham-Kent—Leamington	Greg Hetherington; 15,683; 28.59%	Dave Epp; 22,435; 40.90%	Dan Gelinas; 8,007; 14.60%	Mark Vercouteren; 837; 1.53%	Liz Vallee; 7,892; 14.39%		Dave Epp
Elgin—Middlesex—London	Afeez Ajibowu; 12,326; 19.55%	Karen Vecchio; 31,472; 49.91%	Katelyn Cody; 10,086; 15.99%	Amanda Stark; 1,417; 2.25%	Chelsea Hillier; 7,429; 11.78%	Michael Hopkins (CHP); 328; 0.52%	Karen Vecchio
Essex	Audrey Festeryga; 10,813; 15.45%	Chris Lewis; 28,741; 41.07%	Tracey Ramsey; 22,278; 31.84%	Nancy Pancheshan; 865; 1.24%	Beth Charron-Rowberry; 6,925; 9.90%	Andrew George (Ind.); 172 0.25%	Chris Lewis
Essex	Audrey Festeryga; 10,813; 15.45%	Chris Lewis; 28,741; 41.07%	Tracey Ramsey; 22,278; 31.84%	Nancy Pancheshan; 865; 1.24%	Beth Charron-Rowberry; 6,925; 9.90%	Jeremy Palko (CHP); 182 0.26%	Chris Lewis
Lambton—Kent—Middlesex	Sudit Ranade; 12,552; 20.68%	Lianne Rood; 29,431; 48.49%	Jason Henry; 11,107; 18.30%	Jeremy Hull; 1,035; 1.71%	Kevin Mitchell; 6,567; 10.82%		Lianne Rood
London—Fanshawe	Mohamed Hammoud; 11,882; 23.11%	Mattias Vanderley; 12,486; 24.28%	Lindsay Mathyssen; 22,336; 43.44%		Kyle Free; 4,718; 9.18%		Lindsay Mathyssen
London North Centre	Peter Fragiskatos; 22,921; 39.10%	Stephen Gallant; 15,889; 27.11%	Dirka Prout; 15,611; 26.63%	Mary Ann Hodge; 1,297; 2.21%	Marc Emery; 2,902; 4.95%		Peter Fragiskatos
London West	Arielle Kayabaga; 25,308; 36.88%	Rob Flack; 22,273; 32.46%	Shawna Lewkowitz; 16,858; 24.57%		Mike McMullen; 3,409; 4.97%	Jacques Y. Boudreau (Libert.); 773; 1.13%	Kate Young
Sarnia—Lambton	Lois Nantais; 10,975; 19.29%	Marilyn Gladu; 26,292; 46.21%	Adam Kilner; 11,990; 21.07%	Stefanie Bunko; 848; 1.49%	Brian Everaert; 6,359; 11.18%	Tom Laird (CHP); 435; 0.76%	Marilyn Gladu
Windsor—Tecumseh	Irek Kusmierczyk; 18,134; 31.83%	Kathy Borrelli; 14,605; 25.63%	Cheryl Hardcastle; 17,465; 30.65%	Henry Oulevey; 682; 1.20%	Victor Green; 5,927; 10.40%	Laura Chesnik (M-L); 164; 0.29%	Irek Kusmierczyk
Windsor West	Sandra Pupatello; 13,524; 27.77%	Anthony Orlando; 9,415; 19.34%	Brian Masse; 21,541; 44.24%		Matthew Giancola; 4,060; 8.34%	Margaret Villamizar (M-L); 153; 0.31%	Brian Masse

== 2019 ==
Electoral district	Candidates						Incumbent
Electoral district	Liberal	Conservative	NDP	Green	PPC	Other	Incumbent
Chatham-Kent—Leamington	Katie Omstead; 16,899; 31.24%	Dave Epp; 25,359; 46.88%	Tony Walsh; 8,229; 15.21%	Mark Vercouteren; 2,233; 4.13%	John Balagtas; 1,061; 1.96%	Paul Coulbeck (Mar.); 307; 0.57%	Dave Van Kesteren†
Elgin—Middlesex—London	Pam Armstrong; 14,324; 23.20%	Karen Vecchio; 31,026; 50.24%	Bob Hargreaves; 11,019; 17.84%	Ericha Hendel; 3,562; 5.77%	Donald Helkaa; 956; 1.55%	Peter Redecop (CHP); 618; 1.00% Richard Styve (Libert.); 249; 0.40%	Karen Vecchio
Essex	Audrey Festeryga; 12,987; 19.02%	Chris Lewis; 28,274; 41.40%	Tracey Ramsey; 23,603; 34.56%	Jennifer Alderson; 2,173; 3.18%	Bill Capes; 1,251; 1.83%		Tracey Ramsey
Lambton—Kent—Middlesex	Jesse McCormick; 14,814; 25.36%	Lianne Rood; 28,651; 49.05%	Dylan Mclay; 9,355; 16.02%	Anthony Li; 3,463; 5.93%	Bria Atkins; 1,804; 3.09%	Rob Lalande (VCP); 325; 0.56%	Bev Shipley†
London—Fanshawe	Mohamed Hammoud; 14,924; 26.85%	Michael van Holst; 13,770; 24.78%	Lindsay Mathyssen; 22,671; 40.79%	Tom Cull; 2,781; 5.00%	Bela Kosoian; 1,132; 2.04%	Stephen Campbell (Ind.); 297; 0.53%	Irene Mathyssen†
London North Centre	Peter Fragiskatos; 27,247; 42.75%	Sarah Bokhari; 15,066; 23.64%	Dirka Prout; 14,887; 23.36%	Carol Dyck; 4,872; 7.64%	Salim Mansur; 1,532; 2.40%	Clara Sorrenti (Comm.); 137; 0.21%	Peter Fragiskatos
London West	Kate Young; 30,622; 42.96%	Liz Snelgrove; 19,910; 27.93%	Shawna Lewkowitz; 15,220; 21.35%	Mary Ann Hodge; 3,827; 5.37%	Mike Mcmullen; 1,171; 1.64%	Jacques Boudreau (Libert.); 523; 0.73%	Kate Young
Sarnia—Lambton	Carmen Lemieux; 12,041; 20.79%	Marilyn Gladu; 28,623; 49.42%	Adam Kilner; 12,644; 21.83%	Peter Robert Smith; 2,490; 4.30%	Brian Everaert; 1,587; 2.74%	Thomas Laird (CHP); 531; 0.92%	Marilyn Gladu
Windsor—Tecumseh	Irek Kusmierczyk; 19,046; 33.44%	Leo Demarce; 15,851; 27.83%	Cheryl Hardcastle; 18,417; 32.33%	Giovanni Abati; 2,177; 3.82%	Dan Burr; 1,279; 2.25%	Laura Chesnik (M-L); 187; 0.33%	Cheryl Hardcastle
Windsor West	Sandra Pupatello; 18,878; 36.33%	Henry Lau; 9,925; 19.10%	Brian Masse; 20,800; 40.03%	Quinn Hunt; 1,325; 2.55%	Darryl Burrell; 958; 1.84%	Margaret Villamizar (M-L); 76; 0.15%	Brian Masse

== 2015 ==
Electoral district	Candidates					Incumbent
Electoral district	Conservative	NDP	Liberal	Green	Other	Incumbent
Chatham-Kent—Leamington	Dave Van Kesteren; 21,677; 41.71%	Tony Walsh; 9,549; 18.37%	Katie Omstead; 19,351; 37.23%	Mark Vercouteren; 1,394; 2.68%		Dave Van Kesteren; Chatham-Kent—Essex
Elgin—Middlesex—London	Karen Louise Vecchio; 28,023; 49.22%	Fred Sinclair; 8,771; 15.41%	Lori Baldwin-Sands; 17,642; 30.99%	Bronagh Joyce Morgan; 1,783; 3.13%	Lou Bernardi (Rhino.); 185 0.32%	Joe Preston†
Elgin—Middlesex—London	Karen Louise Vecchio; 28,023; 49.22%	Fred Sinclair; 8,771; 15.41%	Lori Baldwin-Sands; 17,642; 30.99%	Bronagh Joyce Morgan; 1,783; 3.13%	Michael Hopkins (CHP); 529 0.93%	Joe Preston†
Essex	Jeff Watson; 21,602; 35.69%	Tracey Ramsey; 25,072; 41.42%	Audrey Festeryga; 12,639; 20.88%	Jennifer Alderson; 1,141; 1.88%	Enver Villamizar (M-L); 77; 0.13%	Jeff Watson
Lambton—Kent—Middlesex	Bev Shipley; 28,300; 50.21%	Rex Isaac; 9,598; 17.03%	Ken Filson; 16,592; 29.44%	Jim Johnston; 1,873; 3.32%		Bev Shipley
London—Fanshawe	Suzanna Dieleman; 14,891; 27.20%	Irene Mathyssen; 20,684; 37.78%	Khalil Ramal; 17,214; 31.44%	Matthew Peloza; 1,604; 2.93%	Ali Hamada (Ind.); 352; 0.64%	Irene Mathyssen
London North Centre	Susan Truppe; 19,990; 31.10%	German Gutierrez; 9,423; 14.66%	Peter Fragiskatos; 32,427; 50.45%	Carol Dyck; 2,286; 3.56%	Marvin Roman (M-L); 145; 0.23%	Susan Truppe
London West	Ed Holder; 24,036; 35.33%	Matthew Rowlinson; 10,087; 14.83%	Kate Young; 31,167; 45.82%	Dimitri Lascaris; 1,918; 2.82%	Jacques Y. Boudreau (Libert.); 732 1.08%	Ed Holder
London West	Ed Holder; 24,036; 35.33%	Matthew Rowlinson; 10,087; 14.83%	Kate Young; 31,167; 45.82%	Dimitri Lascaris; 1,918; 2.82%	Michael Lewis (Comm.); 87 0.13%	Ed Holder
Sarnia—Lambton	Marilyn Gladu; 22,565; 38.82%	Jason Wayne McMichael; 18,102; 31.14%	Dave McPhail; 15,853; 27.27%	Peter Smith; 1,605; 2.76%		Patricia Davidson†
Windsor—Tecumseh	Jo-Anne Gignac; 14,656; 27.47%	Cheryl Hardcastle; 23,215; 43.52%	Frank Schiller; 14,177; 26.58%	David Momotiuk; 1,047; 1.96%	Laura Chesnik (M-L); 249; 0.47%	Joe Comartin†
Windsor West	Henry Lau; 9,734; 20.75%	Brian Masse; 24,085; 51.35%	David Sundin; 11,842; 25.25%	Cora LaRussa; 1,083; 2.31%	Margaret Villamizar (M-L); 161; 0.34%	Brian Masse

== 2011 ==
Electoral district	Candidates					Incumbent
Electoral district	Conservative	Liberal	NDP	Green	Other	Incumbent
Chatham-Kent—Essex	Dave Van Kesteren; 23,360; 53.76%	Matt Daudlin; 7,172; 16.51%	Ron Franko; 11,449; 26.35%	Robert Hodgson; 1,470; 3.38%		Dave Van Kesteren
Elgin—Middlesex—London	Joe Preston; 29,147; 57.55%	Graham Warwick; 6,812; 13.45%	Fred Sinclair; 12,439; 24.56%	John Fisher; 1,529; 3.02%	Will Arlow (CAP); 140 0.28%	Joe Preston
Elgin—Middlesex—London	Joe Preston; 29,147; 57.55%	Graham Warwick; 6,812; 13.45%	Fred Sinclair; 12,439; 24.56%	John Fisher; 1,529; 3.02%	Carl Hiemstra (CHP); 582 1.15%	Joe Preston
Essex	Jeff Watson; 25,327; 48.06%	Nelson Santos; 7,465; 14.17%	Taras Natyshak; 18,538; 35.18%	Cora Carriveau; 1,290; 2.45%	Enver Villamizar (M-L); 77; 0.15%	Jeff Watson
Lambton—Kent—Middlesex	Bev Shipley; 29,546; 57.68%	Gayle Stucke; 7,264; 14.18%	Joe Hill; 12,299; 24.01%	Jim Johnston; 1,701; 3.32%	Mike Janssens (CHP); 413; 0.81%	Bev Shipley
London—Fanshawe	Jim Chahbar; 14,294; 33.54%	Roger Caranci; 4,893; 11.48%	Irene Mathyssen; 21,689; 50.90%	Matthew Peloza; 1,202; 2.82%	G.J. Rancourt (CHP); 535; 1.26%	Irene Mathyssen
London North Centre	Susan Truppe; 19,468; 36.96%	Glen Pearson; 17,803; 33.80%	German Gutierrez; 12,996; 24.67%	Mary Ann Hodge; 2,177; 4.13%	AnnaMaria Valastro (AAEVP); 229; 0.43%	Glen Pearson
London West	Ed Holder; 27,675; 44.49%	Doug Ferguson; 16,652; 26.77%	Peter Ferguson; 16,109; 25.90%	Brad Arthur Corbett; 1,703; 2.74%	Rod Morley (United); 65; 0.10%	Ed Holder
Sarnia—Lambton	Pat Davidson; 26,112; 52.58%	Tim Fugard; 6,931; 13.96%	Brian White; 14,856; 29.91%	Tim van Bodegom; 1,252; 2.52%	Christopher Desomeaux-Malm (CHP); 514; 1.03%	Patricia Davidson
Windsor—Tecumseh	Denise Ghanam; 14,945; 33.55%	Irek Kusmierczyk; 5,764; 12.94%	Joe Comartin; 22,235; 49.92%	Kyle Prestanski; 1,354; 3.04%	Laura Chesnik (M-L); 242; 0.54%	Joe Comartin
Windsor West	Lisa Lumley; 12,577; 31.64%	Melanie Deveau; 4,327; 10.89%	Brian Masse; 21,592; 54.33%	Alishia Fox; 1,096; 2.76%	Margaret Villamzir (M-L); 153; 0.38%	Brian Masse

== 2008 ==
Electoral district	Candidates					Incumbent
Electoral district	Conservative	Liberal	NDP	Green	Other	Incumbent
Chatham-Kent— Essex	Dave Van Kesteren; 19,960; 47.92%	Matt Daudlin; 12,127; 29.12%	Ron Cadotte; 6,850; 16.45%	Alina Abbott; 2,712; 6.51%		Dave Van Kesteren
Elgin— Middlesex— London	Joe Preston; 22,970; 48.39%	Suzanne van Bommel; 11,169; 23.53%	Ryan Dolby; 9,135; 19.24%	Noel Burgon; 3,241; 6.83%	Will Arlow (CAP); 96 0.20%	Joe Preston
Elgin— Middlesex— London	Joe Preston; 22,970; 48.39%	Suzanne van Bommel; 11,169; 23.53%	Ryan Dolby; 9,135; 19.24%	Noel Burgon; 3,241; 6.83%	Carl Hiemstra (CHP); 619 1.30%	Joe Preston
Elgin— Middlesex— London	Joe Preston; 22,970; 48.39%	Suzanne van Bommel; 11,169; 23.53%	Ryan Dolby; 9,135; 19.24%	Noel Burgon; 3,241; 6.83%	Michael van Holst (Ind.); 243 0.51%	Joe Preston
Essex	Jeff Watson; 20,608; 40.00%	Susan Whelan; 14,973; 29.06%	Taras Natyshak; 13,703; 26.60%	Richard Bachynsky; 2,234; 4.34%		Jeff Watson
Lambton— Kent— Middlesex	Bev Shipley; 24,516; 51.28%	Jeff Wesley; 11,812; 24.71%	Joe Hill; 7,427; 15.54%	Jim Johnston; 3,386; 7.08%	Micheal Janssens (CHP); 663; 1.39%	Bev Shipley
London—Fanshawe	Mary Lou Ambrogio; 12,659; 30.85%	Jacquie Gauthier; 7,774; 18.94%	Irene Mathyssen; 17,672; 43.06%	Daniel O'Neail; 2,656; 6.47%	Leonard Vanderhoeven (CHP); 276; 0.67%	Irene Mathyssen
London North Centre	Paul Van Meerbergen; 17,712; 32.97%	Glen Pearson; 21,018; 39.13%	Steve Holmes; 9,387; 17.47%	Mary Ann Hodge; 5,603; 10.43%		Glen Pearson
London West	Ed Holder; 22,556; 39.09%	Sue Barnes; 20,435; 35.42%	Peter Ferguson; 8,409; 14.57%	Monica Jarabek; 5,630; 9.76%	Leslie Bartley (CHP); 253 0.44%	Sue Barnes
London West	Ed Holder; 22,556; 39.09%	Sue Barnes; 20,435; 35.42%	Peter Ferguson; 8,409; 14.57%	Monica Jarabek; 5,630; 9.76%	Steve Hunter (PC); 414 0.72%	Sue Barnes
Sarnia—Lambton	Pat Davidson; 23,195; 50.01%	Tim Fugard; 9,404; 20.28%	Andy Bruziewicz; 10,037; 21.64%	Alan McKeown; 3,201; 6.90%	Christopher Desormeaux-Malm (CHP); 545; 1.18%	Patricia Davidson
Windsor—Tecumseh	Denise Ghanam; 10,276; 23.93%	Steve Mastroianni; 9,005; 20.97%	Joe Comartin; 20,914; 48.70%	Kyle Prestanski; 2,749; 6.40%		Joe Comartin
Windsor West	Lisa Lumley; 8,954; 22.61%	Larry Horwitz; 7,357; 18.58%	Brian Masse; 20,791; 52.51%	John Esposito; 2,253; 5.69%	Elizabeth Rowley (Comm.); 125 0.32%	Brian Masse
Windsor West	Lisa Lumley; 8,954; 22.61%	Larry Horwitz; 7,357; 18.58%	Brian Masse; 20,791; 52.51%	John Esposito; 2,253; 5.69%	Margaret Villamizar (M-L); 116 0.29%	Brian Masse

== 2006 ==
Electoral district	Candidates						Incumbent
Electoral district	Liberal	Conservative	NDP	Green	Marxist-Leninist	Other	Incumbent
Chatham-Kent—Essex	Jim Comiskey; 15,204; 31.26%	Dave Van Kesteren; 20,820; 42.81%	Kathleen Kevany; 10,875; 22.36%	Ken Bell; 1,737; 3.57%			Jerry Pickard†
Elgin—Middlesex—London	Crispin Colvin; 13,517; 26.34%	Joe Preston; 23,416; 45.62%	Tim McCallum; 9,873; 19.24%	Jonathan Martyn; 2,873; 5.60%		Will Arlow (CAP); 105 0.20%	Joe Preston
Elgin—Middlesex—London	Crispin Colvin; 13,517; 26.34%	Joe Preston; 23,416; 45.62%	Tim McCallum; 9,873; 19.24%	Jonathan Martyn; 2,873; 5.60%		Phill Borm (PC); 504 0.98%	Joe Preston
Elgin—Middlesex—London	Crispin Colvin; 13,517; 26.34%	Joe Preston; 23,416; 45.62%	Tim McCallum; 9,873; 19.24%	Jonathan Martyn; 2,873; 5.60%		Ken DeVries (CHP); 1,039 2.02%	Joe Preston
Essex	Susan Whelan; 19,510; 34.08%	Jeff Watson; 23,125; 40.40%	Taras Natyshak; 12,993; 22.70%	James McVeity; 1,507; 2.63%	Bob Cruise; 108; 0.19%		Jeff Watson
Lambton—Kent—Middlesex	Jeff Wesley; 16,835; 31.01%	Bev Shipley; 25,170; 46.36%	Kevin Blake; 9,330; 17.19%	Jim Johnston; 2,156; 3.97%		Mike Janssens (CHP); 797; 1.47%	Rose-Marie Ur†
London—Fanshawe	Glen Douglas Pearson; 15,199; 32.64%	Dan Mailer; 13,495; 28.98%	Irene Mathyssen; 16,067; 34.51%	David McLaughlin; 1,803; 3.87%			Pat O'Brien†
London North Centre	Joe Fontana; 24,109; 40.12%	John Mazzilli; 17,968; 29.90%	Stephen Maynard; 14,271; 23.75%	Stuart Smith; 3,300; 5.49%	Margaret Mondaca; 160; 0.27%	Rod Morley (PC); 283; 0.47%	Joe Fontana
London West	Sue Barnes; 23,019; 37.70%	Al Gretzky; 21,690; 35.53%	Gina Barber; 13,056; 21.39%	Monica Jarabek; 2,900; 4.75%	Margaret Villamizar; 59; 0.10%	Steve Hunter (PC); 328; 0.54%	Sue Barnes
Sarnia—Lambton	Roger Gallaway; 17,649; 33.11%	Pat Davidson; 21,841; 40.98%	Greg Agar; 10,673; 20.02%	Mike Jacobs; 1,712; 3.21%		Gary De Boer (CHP); 1,108 2.08%	Roger Gallaway
Sarnia—Lambton	Roger Gallaway; 17,649; 33.11%	Pat Davidson; 21,841; 40.98%	Greg Agar; 10,673; 20.02%	Mike Jacobs; 1,712; 3.21%		John Elliott (Ind.); 316 0.59%	Roger Gallaway
Windsor—Tecumseh	Bruck Easton; 13,413; 26.43%	Rick Fuschi; 12,851; 25.32%	Joe Comartin; 22,646; 44.63%	Catherine Pluard; 1,644; 3.24%	Laura Chesnik; 193; 0.38%		Joe Comartin
Windsor West	Werner Keller; 12,110; 25.39%	Al Teshuba; 9,592; 20.11%	Brian Masse; 23,608; 49.49%	Jillana Bishop; 1,444; 3.03%	Enver Villamizar; 108; 0.23%	Chris Schnurr (PC); 614 1.29%	Brian Masse
Windsor West	Werner Keller; 12,110; 25.39%	Al Teshuba; 9,592; 20.11%	Brian Masse; 23,608; 49.49%	Jillana Bishop; 1,444; 3.03%	Enver Villamizar; 108; 0.23%	Habib Zaidi (Ind.); 224 0.47%	Brian Masse

== 2004 ==
Electoral district	Candidates					Incumbent
Electoral district	Liberal	Conservative	NDP	Green	Other	Incumbent
Chatham-Kent—Essex	Jerry Pickard; 17,435	Dave Van Kesteren; 17,028	Kathleen Kevany; 7,538	Rod Hetherington; 1,845	150	Jerry Pickard
Elgin—Middlesex—London	Gar Knutson; 15,860	Joe Preston; 20,333	Tim Mccallum; 6,763	Julie-Ann Stodolny; 2,033	1,392	Gar Knutson
Essex	Susan Whelan; 17,926	Jeff Watson; 18,755	David Tremblay; 12,519	Paul Forman; 1,981	105	Susan Whelan
London North Centre	Joe Fontana; 21,472	Tim Gatten; 13,677	Joe Swan; 12,034	Bronagh Joyce Morgan; 2,376	287	Joe Fontana
London West	Sue Barnes; 25,061	Mike Menear; 17,335	Gina Barber; 9,522	Rebecca Bromwich; 2,611	578	Sue Barnes
London—Fanshawe	Pat O'Brien; 15,664	John Mazzilli; 10,811	Irene Mathyssen; 12,511	Ed Moore; 1,634	518	Pat O'Brien
Middlesex—Kent—Lambton	Rose-Marie Ur; 19,452	Bev Shipley; 19,288	Kevin Blake; 7,376	Allan Mckeown; 1,834	1,015	Rose-Marie Ur; Lambton—Kent—Middlesex
Sarnia—Lambton	Roger Gallaway; 19,932	Marcel Beaubien; 14,500	Greg Agar; 7,764	Anthony Cramer; 2,548	2,797	Roger Gallaway
Windsor West	Richard Pollock; 13,831	Jordan Katz; 8,348	Brian Masse; 20,297	Rob Spring; 1,545	134	Brian Masse (Note: Elected in a 2002 by-election following the resignation of the Liberal MP Herb Gray.)
Windsor—Tecumseh	Richard G.J. Limoges; 16,219	Rick Fuschi; 9,827	Joe Comartin; 20,037	Elizabeth Powles; 1,613	182	Joe Comartin; Windsor—St. Clair

=== Maps ===
1. Chatham-Kent-Essex
2. Elgin-Middlesex-London
3. Essex
4. London-Fanshawe
5. London North Centre
6. London West
7. Lambton-Kent-Middlesex
8. Sarnia-Lambton
9. Windsor-Tecumseh
10. Windsor West
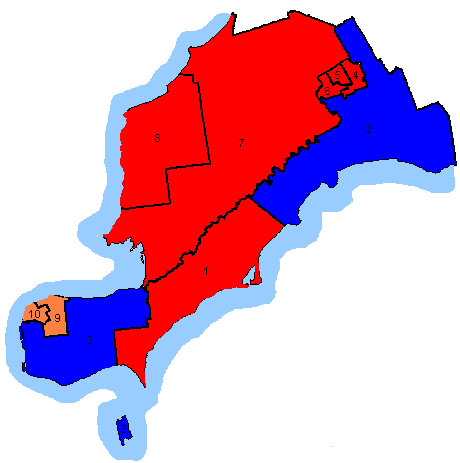
Key map

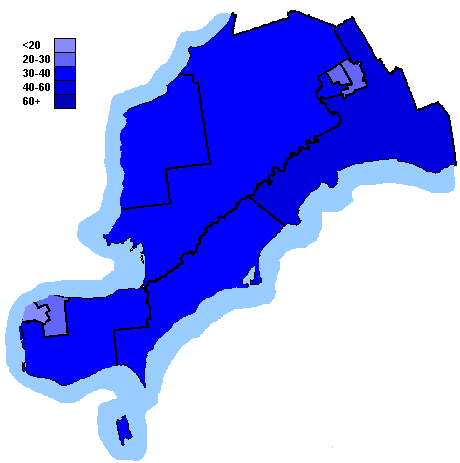
Conservative Party of Canada

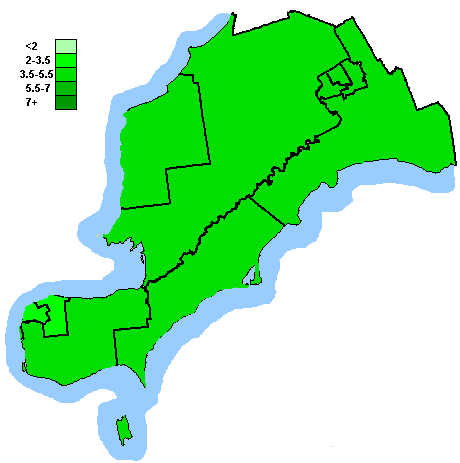
Green Party of Canada

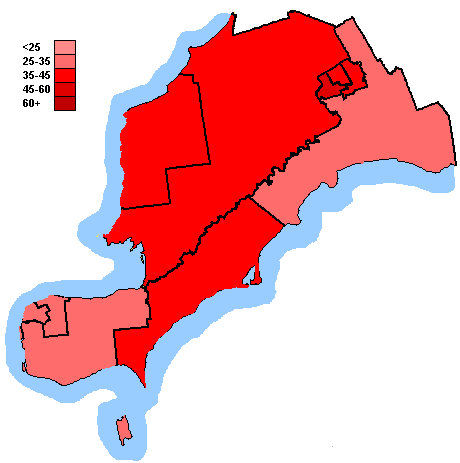
Liberal Party of Canada

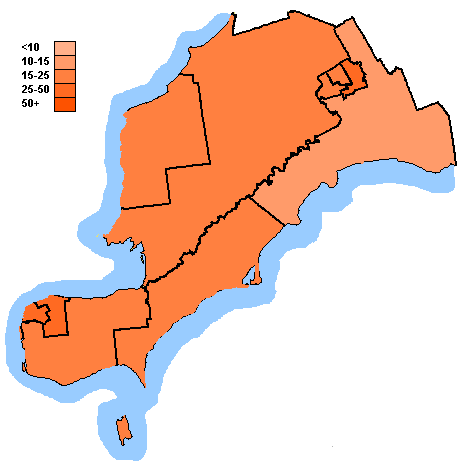
New Democratic Party

== 2000 ==
Electoral district	Candidates					Incumbent
Electoral district	Liberal	Canadian Alliance	NDP	PC	Other	Incumbent
Chatham-Kent—Essex	Jerry Pickard; 20,085	Sean Smart; 12,957	Susan Mackay; 2,209	Ryan Bailey; 4,156	1,001	Jerry Pickard; Kent—Essex
Elgin—Middlesex—London	Gar Knutson; 17,202	Bill Walters; 15,496	Tim Mccallum; 2,319	Delia Reiche; 6,080	838	Gar Knutson
Essex	Susan Whelan; 20,524	Scott Cowan; 16,019	Marion Overholt; 6,431	Merrill Baker; 3,175	152	Susan Whelan
Lambton—Kent—Middlesex	Rose-Marie Ur; 21,124	Ron Young; 13,302	Joyce Jolliffe; 1,871	John Phair; 5,918	938	Rose-Marie Ur
London North Centre	Joe Fontana; 22,795	Nancy Branscombe; 9,062	Colleen Redmond; 3,936	Lorie Johnson; 7,305	1,199	Joe Fontana; London—Adelaide
London West	Sue Barnes; 23,794	Salim Mansur; 10,162	George Goodlet; 3,596	Jeff Lang; 9,788	855	Sue Barnes
London—Fanshawe	Pat O'Brien; 19,677	Robert Vaughan; 7,998	Andrew Sadler; 4,107	Derrall Bellaire; 4,119		Pat O'Brien
Sarnia—Lambton	Roger Gallaway; 19,329	Dave Christie; 11,208	Glenn Sonier; 2,735	Paul Bailey; 3,320	1,328	Roger Gallaway
Windsor West	Herb Gray; 20,729	Jeff Watson; 8,777	John McGinlay; 6,080	Ian West; 2,116	533	Herb Gray
Windsor—St. Clair	Rick Limoges; 16,600	Phillip Pettinato; 5,639	Joe Comartin; 17,001	Bruck Easton; 1,906	485	Rick Limoges (Note: Elected in a 1999 by-election following the resignation of Liberal MP Shaughnessy Cohen.)
