= Pag =

Pag may refer to:

== Places ==
- Pag (island), Croatia
  - Pag (town)
- Pag, Iranshahr, Iran

== People ==
- Michel Pagliaro, Canadian musician nicknamed "Pag"

== Other uses ==
- Pangasinan language, ISO 639 language code pag
- Pag, nickname for Leoncavallo's 1892 opera Pagliacci, often performed on a double bill with Mascagni's Cavalleria rusticana known colloquially as "Cav and Pag"
- Pag cheese, a sheep milk cheese from the Croatian island Pag

== See also ==
- PAG (disambiguation)
- Pags (disambiguation)
- Professional agrologist (PAg), the professional designation for the agrology profession in Canada
