= List of MPs who lost their seat in the 2025 Canadian federal election =

This is a list of members of Parliament (MPs) who lost their seat in the 2025 Canadian federal election. All of these MPs sat in the 44th Canadian Parliament but were not returned to the House of Commons following the election.

== Summary ==
Defeated incumbents by party
Party	Defeated by					
Party	Total	NDP	LPC	CPC	BQ	GPC
New Democratic	13	–	6	7	0	0
Liberal	13	0	–	12	1	0
Conservative	9	0	9	–	0	0
Bloc Québécois	8	0	7	1	–	0
Green	1	0	0	1	0	–

== List of MPs ==
Full list of defeated incumbents and their successors
Party	Province	Region	Electoral District	Incumbent	Defeated by	
Party	Province	Region	Electoral District	Incumbent	Member	Party
Conservative	British Columbia	Metro Vancouver	South Surrey—White Rock	Kerry-Lynne Findlay	Ernie Klassen	Liberal
Conservative	British Columbia	British Columbia Interior	Kelowna	Tracy Gray	Stephen Fuhr	Liberal
Conservative	Manitoba	Winnipeg	Winnipeg West	Marty Morantz	Doug Eyolfson	Liberal
Conservative	Nova Scotia	South Shore	South Shore—St. Margarets	Rick Perkins	Jessica Fancy-Landry	Liberal
Conservative	Nova Scotia	North Shore	Cumberland—Colchester	Stephen Ellis	Alana Hirtle	Liberal
Conservative	Ontario	Ottawa	Carleton (details)	Pierre Poilievre	Bruce Fanjoy	Liberal
Conservative	Ontario	Central Ontario	Peterborough	Michelle Ferreri	Emma Harrison	Liberal
Conservative	Ontario	Toronto	Toronto—St. Paul's	Don Stewart	Leslie Church	Liberal
Conservative	Ontario	Eastern Ontario	Bay of Quinte	Ryan Williams	Chris Malette	Liberal
New Democratic	Ontario	Hamilton	Hamilton Centre	Matthew Green	Aslam Rana	Liberal
New Democratic	Ontario	Southwestern Ontario	London—Fanshawe	Lindsay Mathyssen	Kurt Holman	Conservative
New Democratic	Ontario	Southwestern Ontario	Windsor West	Brian Masse	Harb Gill	Conservative
New Democratic	Manitoba	Northern Manitoba	Churchill—Keewatinook Aski	Niki Ashton	Rebecca Chartrand	Liberal
New Democratic	Manitoba	Winnipeg	Elmwood—Transcona	Leila Dance	Colin Reynolds	Conservative
New Democratic	Alberta	Edmonton	Edmonton Griesbach	Blake Desjarlais	Kerry Diotte	Conservative
New Democratic	British Columbia	British Columbia Coast	Skeena—Bulkley Valley	Taylor Bachrach	Ellis Ross	Conservative
New Democratic	British Columbia	Metro Vancouver	Burnaby Central (details)	Jagmeet Singh	Wade Chang	Liberal
New Democratic	British Columbia	Metro Vancouver	Port Moody—Coquitlam	Bonita Zarrillo	Zoe Royer	Liberal
New Democratic	British Columbia	Metro Vancouver	New Westminster—Burnaby—Maillardville	Peter Julian	Jake Sawatzky	Liberal
New Democratic	British Columbia	Vancouver Island	Cowichan—Malahat—Langford	Alistair MacGregor	Jeff Kibble	Conservative
New Democratic	British Columbia	Vancouver Island	Nanaimo—Ladysmith	Lisa Marie Barron	Tamara Kronis	Conservative
New Democratic	British Columbia	Vancouver Island	Victoria	Laurel Collins	Will Greaves	Liberal
Liberal	Alberta	Calgary	Calgary McKnight	George Chahal	Dalwinder Gill	Conservative
Liberal	British Columbia	Metro Vancouver	Richmond Centre—Marpole	Wilson Miao	Chak Au	Conservative
Liberal	Ontario	Toronto	York Centre	Ya'ara Saks	Roman Baber	Conservative
Liberal	Ontario	Brampton	Brampton West	Kamal Khera	Amarjeet Gill	Conservative
Liberal	Ontario	Hamilton	Hamilton East—Stoney Creek	Chad Collins	Ned Kuruc	Conservative
Liberal	Ontario	Niagara	Niagara South	Vance Badawey	Fred Davies	Conservative
Liberal	Ontario	Southern Durham and York	Vaughan—Woodbridge	Francesco Sorbara	Michael Guglielmin	Conservative
Liberal	Ontario	Southern Durham and York	Richmond Hill South	Majid Jowhari	Vincent Ho	Conservative
Liberal	Ontario	Northern Ontario	Sudbury East—Manitoulin—Nickel Belt	Marc G. Serré	Jim Belanger	Conservative
Liberal	Ontario	Southwestern Ontario	Kitchener South—Hespeler	Valerie Bradford	Matt Strauss	Conservative
Liberal	Ontario	Southwestern Ontario	Cambridge	Bryan May	Connie Cody	Conservative
Liberal	Ontario	Southwestern Ontario	Windsor—Tecumseh—Lakeshore	Irek Kusmierczyk	Kathy Borrelli	Conservative
Liberal	Quebec	Eastern Quebec	Gaspésie—Les Îles-de-la-Madeleine—Listuguj	Diane Lebouthillier	Alexis Deschênes	Bloc Québécois
Bloc Québécois	Quebec	Quebec City	Beauport—Limoilou	Julie Vignola	Steeve Lavoie	Liberal
Bloc Québécois	Quebec	Montérégie	La Prairie—Atateken	Alain Therrien	Jacques Ramsay	Liberal
Bloc Québécois	Quebec	Montreal	LaSalle—Émard—Verdun	Louis-Philippe Sauvé	Claude Guay	Liberal
Bloc Québécois	Quebec	Montérégie	Longueuil—Saint-Hubert	Denis Trudel	Natilien Joseph	Liberal
Bloc Québécois	Quebec	Northern Quebec	Abitibi—Baie-James—Nunavik—Eeyou	Sylvie Bérubé	Mandy Gull-Masty	Liberal
Bloc Québécois	Quebec	Lanaudière	Rivière-des-Mille-Îles	Luc Desilets	Linda Lapointe	Liberal
Bloc Québécois	Quebec	Lanaudière	Terrebonne (details)	Nathalie Sinclair-Desgagné	Tatiana Auguste	Liberal
Bloc Québécois	Quebec	Capitale-Nationale	Montmorency—Charlevoix	Caroline Desbiens	Gabriel Hardy	Conservative
Green	Ontario	Southwestern Ontario	Kitchener Centre	Mike Morrice	Kelly DeRidder	Conservative
