= Chatham-Kent—Leamington =

Chatham-Kent—Leamington could refer to:

- Chatham-Kent—Leamington (federal electoral district)
- Chatham-Kent—Leamington (provincial electoral district)
