= Eugene Whelan =

Canadian politician

The Honourable Eugene Whelan PC OC CD PAg LLD (h.c.)

Minister of Agriculture
- In office 3 March 1980 – 29 June 1984
- Prime Minister: Pierre Trudeau
- Preceded by: John Wise
- Succeeded by: Ralph Ferguson
- In office 27 November 1972 – 3 June 1979
- Prime Minister: Pierre Trudeau
- Preceded by: Bud Olson
- Succeeded by: John Wise

Canadian Senator from Ontario
- In office 9 August 1996 – 11 July 1999
- Appointed by: Jean Chrétien

Member of Parliament for Essex (Essex—Windsor; 1972–1984)
- In office 25 June 1968 – 3 September 1984
- Preceded by: Riding re-created
- Succeeded by: Steven Langdon

Member of Parliament for Essex South
- In office 18 June 1962 – 24 June 1968
- Preceded by: Richard Thrasher
- Succeeded by: Riding dissolved

Personal details
- Born: Eugene Francis Whelan; 11 July 1924 Amherstburg, Ontario, Canada
- Died: 19 February 2013 (aged 88) Amherstburg, Ontario, Canada
- Resting place: St. John the Baptist Cemetery, Amherstburg, Ontario, Canada; 42°6′35.52″N 83°5′00.43″W
- Party: Liberal
- Spouse: Elizabeth Pollinger (m. 1960)
- Children: 3, including Susan
- Occupation: Farmer

Eugene Francis "Gene" Whelan PC OC CD PAg LLD (h.c.) (11 July 1924 – 19 February 2013) was a Canadian farmer and Liberal politician. He served in the House of Commons of Canada from 1962 to 1984 and was minister of agriculture from 1972 to 1979 and from 1980 to 1984. He ran to succeed Prime Minister Pierre Trudeau in the 1984 Liberal Party of Canada leadership election, finishing last. Whelan also served as president of the United Nations World Food Council from 1983 to 1985. In 1996, he was appointed to the Senate of Canada by Jean Chrétien, serving until 1999.

Before entering federal politics, Whelan was a farmer active in agricultural organizations. As agriculture minister, he promoted the expansion of national marketing boards, secured increased federal support for farmers, and opened markets in the Soviet Union for Canadian wheat. He was also known for his green stetson and his outspoken advocacy for the agricultural sector.

During his final term as agriculture minister, Whelan developed a close relationship with Soviet ambassador Aleksandr Yakovlev. In 1983, he arranged a three-week Canadian tour for Yakovlev and then Soviet agriculture minister Mikhail Gorbachev. During the visit, Gorbachev and Yakovlev held an extended discussion near Whelan's farm that Yakovlev later associated with the origins of perestroika.

== Early years ==
Eugene Whelan was born in Amherstburg, Ontario, the middle of nine children born to Irish-Canadian farmers Charles B. Whelan and Frances L. Kelly. He was educated in Windsor and Walkerville. At 16, Whelan quit school and worked for a time as a welder and tool and die maker before returning to farming.

In 1960, Whelan married Elizabeth Pollinger and they had a family. One daughter went into politics (see Family below). His brother Edward Charles Whelan made his life in Saskatchewan. He also went into politics, being elected and serving in the Legislative Assembly of Saskatchewan.

== Political career ==
Whelan (centre), pictured with fellow MPs Herb Gray and Paul Martin in 1962.

Whelan entered municipal politics at age 21 and surprisingly won an election to the separate school board of Anderdon Township, which administered Catholic schools. He was next elected as councillor and eventually reeve of the township council, becoming warden of the Essex County council in 1962. He ran unsuccessfully for a seat in the Ontario assembly in 1959.

During that time, he supported himself as a farmer and became active in farm issues and groups. He became a director and president of the Harrow Farmer's Co-operative, served on the boards of United Co-operatives of Ontario and the Co-operators Insurance Company, and was a founding member of the Ontario Wheat Producers' Marketing Board and the Ontario Federation of Agriculture.

Whelan first won a seat in the House of Commons in the 1962 election, representing the southwestern Ontario riding of Essex, and held it until his retirement in 1984. Whelan ran to succeed Trudeau at the 1984 Liberal leadership convention, but came in last. In 1996, Whelan was appointed to the Senate by Jean Chrétien, and served in the chamber until he reached the mandatory retirement age of 75 in 1999.

=== Minister of Agriculture ===
In 1972, Whelan was appointed as Minister of Agriculture in the cabinet of Pierre Trudeau, and held the position until Trudeau's retirement in 1984, except during the 1979-1980 Joe Clark government.

He once recalled a time when his qualifications for Minister were questioned:

I remember one time when I was out West, someone asked me what the hell I knew, coming from Ontario, about being minister of agriculture and I said I knew just as much as Allan Blakeney, premier of Saskatchewan who was born in Nova Scotia, or Don Getty in Alberta who was born in Quebec, or Bill Vander Zalm in B.C. who came from Holland. The fact is that I came from the most diversified farming region in the country, and we were diversified farmers ourselves. We had it all and I was an agriculture minister who really had hands on experience.

As Minister, Whelan promoted the extension of national marketing boards — first implemented with the creation of the Canadian Dairy Commission in 1970 — to eggs in 1972, turkey in 1974, and chicken in 1978. These were placed under the supervision of the National Farm Products Council. For those commodities not under supply management, he fought to maintain a level playing field in world markets at a time when other countries strongly subsidized such products. He was successful in getting the Canadian government to increase its support for farmers, through amendments to the Agricultural Stabilization Act and the introduction of the Western Grain Stabilization Act. In 1977, the Advance Payments for Crops Act was passed, which guaranteed loans to producers requiring advance payments for perishable crops. He opened markets in the Soviet Union for Canadian wheat, and established legislation to protect fruit and vegetable growers from processor bankruptcies. He also restricted the powers of the Canadian Wheat Board, allowing private-sector feed grain trading and inter-provincial movement of feed.

Whelan's English was rough-hewn, and his French was non-existent. He openly acknowledged this, exclaiming:

Canada has two official languages and I don't speak none of them.

Whelan was one of Pierre Trudeau's best constitutional campaigners. However, in 1976 angry Quebec dairy farmers threw diluted milk on Whelan after cabinet refused to approve dairy subsidies to compensate farmers in a collapsed world market. Whelan said this refusal contributed to the success of the Parti Québécois in rural ridings that fall.

His green stetson hat became well-known and Whelan was seen as an ardently vociferous advocate for the agricultural sector, with a habit for plain-spokenness (which occasionally got him in trouble). In response to complaints voiced over the cost of food, when he wanted to stress the average farmer's narrow profit margin, he said:

The cost of cars, fur coats, housing, booze, travel goes up and who gets excited? Nobody, because they don't buy these things every day. Potatoes go up a few cents and my God, everybody's crying.

=== Catalyst for Russian perestroika ===
During his last term as Minister of Agriculture, Whelan became good friends with Aleksandr Yakovlev, then the USSR's Ambassador to Canada, as both men were ardent agriculturalists. The relationship became so close that Pierre Trudeau called him in to get assurance that Whelan had not divulged any national secrets, as the minister was a member of the Cabinet defence committee. When Mikhail Gorbachev, then Soviet Minister of Agriculture, came to Canada in 1983, Yakovlev connected Gorbachev with Whelan, who arranged a three-week tour across Canada for both Soviet officials, accompanied personally by Whelan.

In 2013 Jean Chrétien recalled Whelan introducing Gorbachev to Canadian life when the tour came to Windsor:

'He came to Windsor and introduced him to the life of a Canadian,' Chretien said. 'He was amazed at the food processing in Canada, to have all the food available so quickly. Later on, they were driving and he was marvelling to see two cars in front of every house.'

The group stopped in front of one blue-collar home.

'Gorbachev said, "Do you know them?" And Gene said, "I don't know them, but they know me,"' Chretien recalled. 'So they knocked on the door and went into the house. Gorbachev was very impressed by that.'

At the end of that tour, the Whelans hosted a farewell reception for Gorbachev at their Amherstburg home on the evening of 19 May 1983. Whelan was delayed in arriving. In what has since been called "the walk that changed the world", Yakovlev and Gorbachev walked in a nearby orchard, strolled among saplings and past fields of corn, soy and wheat, had an earnest discussion, and resolved that the old ways in the USSR had to end.

According to Yakovlev, this was where perestroika was born, with 80% of its features discussed while visiting Whelan's farm.

In an interview years later, Yakovlev recalled:

At first we kind of sniffed around each other and our conversations didn't touch on serious issues. And then, verily, history plays tricks on one, we had a lot of time together as guests of then Liberal Minister of Agriculture Eugene Whelan in Canada who, himself, was too late for the reception because he was stuck with some striking farmers somewhere. So we took a long walk on that Minister's farm and, as it often happens, both of us [Yakovlev and Gorbachev] suddenly were just kind of flooded and let go. I somehow, for some reason, threw caution to the wind and started telling him about what I considered to be utter stupidities in the area of foreign affairs, especially about those SS-20 missiles that were being stationed in Europe and a lot of other things. And he did the same thing. We were completely frank. He frankly talked about the problems in the internal situation in Russia. He was saying that under these conditions, the conditions of dictatorship and absence of freedom, the country would simply perish. So it was at that time, during our three-hour conversation, almost as if our heads were knocked together, that we poured it all out and during that three-hour conversation we actually came to agreement on all our main points.

== Broadcasting ==
Whelan was once host of the Agricultural Hour on CFRA in Ottawa.

== International appointments ==
He served as president of the United Nations World Food Council from 1983 to 1985. Whelan was appointed as Canadian ambassador to the UN Food and Agriculture Organization (FAO) in Rome. Progressive Conservative Party of Canada leader Brian Mulroney promised to rescind the appointment if he became Prime Minister. Mulroney won the 1984 election, and recalled Whelan as one of his first acts of office.

Whelan also actively participated in the Agri-Energy Roundtable (AER), an international non-governmental organization which forged a dialogue between food-surplus and energy-surplus nations, their private sectors, and multilateral agencies. Working with US Senator Jennings Randolph (D-WV) - a noted humanitarian- and Lord Walston of the United Kingdom and others, Whelan helped the AER to gain United Nations recognition in 1985. Whelan joined AER's Committee of Honor and rose to become AER's vice chairman. As such he presided at a number of international conferences in the late 1980s.

== Honours ==
- In 1967, awarded the Canadian Centennial Medal as a sitting MP.
- In 1977, awarded the Canadian version of the Queen Elizabeth II Silver Jubilee Medal as a sitting MP.
- On 27 November 1972, Whelan was sworn in as a Member of the Queen's Privy Council for Canada, giving him the honorific prefix "The Honourable" and the Post Nominal Letters "PC" for life.
- In 1976, he was made honorary colonel of the 21st (Windsor) Service Battalion.
- In 1983, he received an honorary Doctor of Laws from the University of Windsor.
- In 1986, the Freedom Award from the Windsor–Detroit International Freedom Festival.
- In 1987, he was made an Officer of the Order of Canada, giving him the Post Nominal Letters "OC" for life.
- In 2001, induction into the Canadian Agricultural Hall of Fame.
- In 2001, induction into the Ontario Agricultural Hall of Fame.
- Honorary life member of the Agricultural Institute of Canada and the Ontario Institute of Agrologists.
- In 2002, he was awarded the Canadian version of the Queen Elizabeth II Golden Jubilee Medal.
- In 2012, he was awarded the Canadian version of the Queen Elizabeth II Diamond Jubilee Medal.
- He was awarded the Canadian Forces' Decoration for 12 years service in the Canadian Forces as an Honorary Colonel of 21 (Windsor) Service Battalion. This gave him the Post Nominal Letters "CD" for life.

- In 1984, the Woodslee soil substation of Agriculture and Agri-Food Canada's Greenhouse and Processing Crops Research Centre, located at Woodslee, Ontario, was renamed as the Honourable Eugene F. Whelan Experimental Farm.
- In 2008, the Whelan ancestral home, where Eugene was born, was relocated for preservation to the Canadian Transportation Museum and Historical Village in Essex, Ontario.

== Family ==
Whelan and his wife Elizabeth had three daughters. Susan Whelan went into politics and was elected to the House of Commons in 1993 in her father's old riding. In 2001 she was appointed as Minister of International Trade in Chrétien's cabinet. She was dropped from Cabinet with the change of administrations when Paul Martin became prime minister.

== Death and funeral ==
He died at his home in Amherstburg on February 19, 2013, following complications from heart disease and colon cancer. His funeral was held on February 23, 2013, at St. John The Baptist Church in Amherstburg, and he was buried in the church cemetery. Jean Chrétien, Herb Gray and Remo Mancini were among the people that gave eulogies at the service.

== Electoral record ==
=== Essex South ===
1962 Canadian federal election
Party	Candidate	Votes	%	±%
Liberal	WHELAN, Eugene	11,397	48.7%	+13.6%
Progressive Conservative	THRASHER, Richard D.	10,409	44.4%	-16.8%
New Democratic	CERVIN, Val	1,342	5.7%	+2.0%
Unknown	BACKER, Jack	284	1.2%	+1.2%
Total valid votes		23,432	100.0%	
Liberal gain		Swing		+15.4%

1963 Canadian federal election
Party	Candidate	Votes	%	±%
Liberal	WHELAN, Eugene F.	12,947	50.7%	+2.0%
Progressive Conservative	THRASHER, Richard Devere	12,178	47.7%	+3.3%
Social Credit	BACKER, Jack	419	1.6%	-4.1%
Total valid votes		25,544	100.0%	
Liberal hold		Swing		-0.6%

1965 Canadian federal election
Party	Candidate	Votes	%	±%
Liberal	WHELAN, Eugene F.	12,887	53.1%	+2.4%
Progressive Conservative	THRASHER, Richard D.	10,072	41.5%	-6.2%
New Democratic	BERTRAND, Donald E.	1,329	5.4%	+3.8%
Total valid votes		24,288	100.0%	
Liberal hold		Swing		+4.3%

=== Essex-Windsor ===
1980 Canadian federal election: Essex—Windsor
Party	Candidate	Votes	%	±%
Liberal	Eugene Whelan	24,651	51.3%	+7.0%
New Democratic	Steven W. Langdon	19,123	39.8%	-0.7%
Progressive Conservative	Kathy Flood	4,184	8.7%	-6.2%
Marxist–Leninist	Peter Ewart	103	0.2%	-0.1%
Total valid votes		48,061	100.0%	
lop.parl.ca

1979 Canadian federal election: Essex—Windsor
Party	Candidate	Votes	%	±%
Liberal	Eugene Whelan	20,373	44.3%	-10.9%
New Democratic	Steven W. Langdon	18,603	40.4%	+5.0%
Progressive Conservative	Kathy Flood	6,875	14.9%	5.6%
Marxist–Leninist	Pete Ewart	144	0.3%	
Total valid votes		45,995	100.0%	

1974 Canadian federal election: Essex—Windsor
Party	Candidate	Votes	%	±%
Liberal	Eugene Whelan	24,357	55.2%	+7.1%
New Democratic	Charles Brooks	15,656	35.5%	-4.6%
Progressive Conservative	Dennis Herring	4,148	9.4%	-2.6%
Total valid votes		44,161	100.0%	

1972 Canadian federal election: Essex—Windsor
Party	Candidate	Votes	%	±%
Liberal	Eugene Whelan	19,793	48.0%	-1.7%
New Democratic	Ralph N. Wensley	16,503	40.0%	+8.3%
Progressive Conservative	Edmund A. Michael	4,929	12.0%	-6.6%
Total valid votes		41,225	100.0%	

1968 Canadian federal election: Essex
Party	Candidate	Votes	%
Liberal	Eugene Whelan	14,707	49.7%
New Democratic	Ralph N. Wensley	9,399	31.8%
Progressive Conservative	Tom Taylor	5,485	18.5%
Total valid votes		29,591	100.0%

== Archives ==
There is a Eugene F. Whelan fonds at Library and Archives Canada.
