= PAG =

PAG may refer to:

== Science and medicine ==
- Polyalkylene glycol (PAG), a synthetic oil
- Periaqueductal gray (PAG), a brain region
- Polyacrylamide gel (PAG), used in an electrophoresis analysis technique
- Potential acoustic gain, a measure of sound reinforcement system performance

== Businesses and organisations ==
- PAG (investment firm), an Asian investment firm
- Penske Automotive Group, NYSE ticker PAG
- Positive Action Group, a political pressure group on the Isle of Man
- Premier Automotive Group, a group within Ford Motor Company

== Transportation ==
- Pagadian Airport, Philippines, IATA code PAG
- Perimeter Aviation, a Canadian airline, ICAO code PAG

== See also ==
- Pag (disambiguation)
- Pags (disambiguation)
- Professional agrologist (PAg), the professional designation for the agrology profession in Canada
