= Pags =

Pags may refer to:

- Gustavus Airport (ICAO airport code: PAGS) in Alaska
- Joe Pags (born 1966), American radio talk show host

== See also ==
- Pag (disambiguation)
- PAG (disambiguation)
