= Taras Natyshak =

Canadian politician

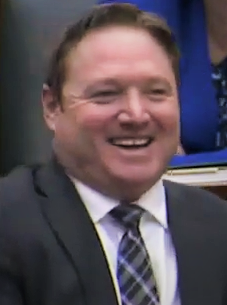

Critic, International Trade
- In office August 23, 2018 – May 3, 2022
- Leader: Andrea Horwath

Member of the Ontario Provincial Parliament for Essex
- In office October 6, 2011 – May 3, 2022
- Preceded by: Bruce Crozier
- Succeeded by: Anthony Leardi

Personal details
- Born: October 12, 1977 (age 48) Essex County, Ontario
- Party: New Democratic
- Spouse: Jennifer Natyshak
- Children: 2
- Occupation: Trade unionist

Taras Natyshak (born October 12, 1977) is a former politician in Ontario, Canada. He was a New Democratic member of the Legislative Assembly of Ontario from 2011 to 2022, representing the riding of Essex.

== Background ==
Natyshak was born in Essex County, Ontario. Natyshak studied political science and labour studies at the University of Windsor. He served as director of training for the Laborers' International Union of North America (LIUNA). He and his wife Jennifer live in Belle River with their two children.

== Politics ==
Natyshak ran as the New Democrat candidate in the federal elections of 2006, 2008 and 2011 in the riding of Essex. He failed to win in each year.

In the 2011 provincial election, he ran as the New Democrat candidate in the riding of Essex. He defeated Progressive Conservative candidate Dave Brister by 1,368 votes. He was re-elected in the 2014 provincial election defeating PC candidate Ray Cecile by 17,914 votes.

He was the party's critic for labour issues.

On June 24, 2020, Natyshak saw controversy after he called Ontario Premier Doug Ford a 'piece of shit' during Question Period when Ford was talking about reopening of the Windsor area during the COVID-19 pandemic. He later apologized for using "unparliamentarily language."

On December 10, 2021, Natyshak announced he would not seek re-election in the 2022 Ontario general election for a fourth term.

== Electoral record ==
=== Provincial elections ===
2018 Ontario general election: Essex
Party	Candidate	Votes	%	±%
New Democratic	Taras Natyshak	26,134	47.95	-12.36
Progressive Conservative	Chris Lewis	23,423	42.98	+21.20
Liberal	Kate Festeryga	3,026	5.55	-8.78
Green	Nancy Pancheshan	1,920	3.52	-0.06
Total valid votes		54,503	99.34	
Total rejected, unmarked and declined ballots		363	0.66	
Turnout		54,866	56.12	
Eligible voters		97,773		
New Democratic hold		Swing		-16.78
Source: Elections Ontario

2014 Ontario general election: Essex
Party	Candidate	Votes	%	±%
New Democratic	Taras Natyshak	28,118	60.34	+22.35
Progressive Conservative	Ray Cecile	10,169	21.82	-13.19
Liberal	Crystal Meloche	6,628	14.22	-10.90
Green	Mark Vercouteren	1,685	3.62	+1.74
Total valid votes		46,600	100.0	
New Democratic hold		Swing		+17.77
Source: Elections Ontario

2011 Ontario general election: Essex
Party	Candidate	Votes	%	±%
New Democratic	Taras Natyshak	17,417	37.99	+17.22
Progressive Conservative	Dave Brister	16,049	35.01	+10.00
Liberal	Ken Schmidt	11,518	25.12	-22.90
Green	Jason Matyi	860	1.88	-3.46
Total valid votes		45,844	100.00	
Total rejected, unmarked and declined ballots		168	0.37	
Turnout		46,012	51.38	
Eligible voters		89,549		
New Democratic gain from Liberal		Swing		+3.61
Source: Elections Ontario

=== Federal elections ===
2011 Canadian federal election: Essex
Party	Candidate	Votes	%	±%
Conservative	Jeff Watson	25,327	48.1%	+8.1%
New Democratic	Taras Natyshak	18,538	35.2%	+8.6%
Liberal	Nelson Santos	7,465	14.2%	-14.9%
Green	Cora Carriveau	1,290	2.4%	-1.9%
Marxist–Leninist	Enver Villamizar	77	0.1%	-0.1%
Total valid votes		52,697	99.6%	
Total rejected ballots		233	0.4%	
Total votes		52,930	100.0%	

Source: Elections Canada

2008 Canadian federal election: Essex
Party	Candidate	Votes	%	±%	Expenditures
Conservative	Jeff Watson	20,608	40.0%	-0.4%	$87,306
Liberal	Susan Whelan	14,973	29.1%	-5.0%	$87,544
New Democratic	Taras Natyshak	13,703	26.6%	+3.9%	$47,430
Green	Richard Bachynsky	2,234	4.3%	+1.6%	$0
Total valid votes/expense limit		51,518	100.0%	$90,595	
Total rejected ballots		206			
Turnout		51,724	%		

2006 Canadian federal election: Essex
Party	Candidate	Votes	%	±%
Conservative	Jeff Watson	23,125	40.4%	+3.8%
Liberal	Susan Whelan	19,508	34.1%	-0.9%
New Democratic	Taras Natyshak	12,992	22.7%	-1.7%
Green	James McVeity	1,518	2.7%	-1.2%
Marxist–Leninist	Robert Cruise	108	0.2%	0.0%
Total valid votes		57,251		
Total valid votes		57,251	100.0%	
