= Steven W. Langdon =

Canadian politician (born 1946)

Steven Langdon

Member of Parliament for Essex—Windsor
- In office 1984–1993
- Preceded by: Eugene Whelan
- Succeeded by: Susan Whelan

Personal details
- Born: July 15, 1946 (age 80) Stratford, Ontario, Canada
- Party: New Democratic Party
- Education: University of Sussex; University of Toronto
- Occupation: Professor

Steven W. Langdon (born July 15, 1946) is a Canadian academic, politician, economist, and former parliamentarian.

Born in Stratford, Ontario, Langdon graduated from the University of Trinity College in the University of Toronto in 1969. He also has a master's degree from Carleton University and a doctorate from the University of Sussex.

He ran for the New Democratic Party four times before being elected to the House of Commons from Essex in the 1984 election.

Langdon was re-elected in the 1988 election and stood as a left-wing candidate to succeed Ed Broadbent in the 1989 NDP leadership convention. He finished third behind Audrey McLaughlin, the eventual winner, and Dave Barrett.

He lost his seat in the 1993 election along with all of Ontario's federal NDP MPs.

Since leaving politics, Langdon has worked as an adjunct research professor in the department of economics at Carleton University in Ottawa.

== Electoral record ==
1993 Canadian federal election: Essex—Windsor
Party	Candidate	Votes	%	±%
Liberal	Susan Whelan	25,200	55.1%	+13.8%
New Democratic	Steven W. Langdon	12,650	27.7%	-16.4%
Reform	John Larsen	6,029	13.2%	
Progressive Conservative	Brian Payne	1,481	3.2%	-11.1%
National	George Opacic	194	0.4%	
Marxist–Leninist	Paul Hawkins	83	0.2%	
Commonwealth of Canada	Vlado Zugaj	67	0.1%	
Total valid votes		45,704	100.0%	

1989 New Democratic Party leadership election
Candidate	1st ballot		2nd ballot		3rd ballot		4th ballot	
Name	Votes cast	%	Votes cast	%	Votes cast	%	Votes cast	%
Audrey McLaughlin	646	26.9%	829	34.3%	1,072	44.4%	1,316	55.1%
Dave Barrett	566	23.6%	780	32.3%	947	39.3%	1,072	44.9%
Steven W. Langdon	351	14.6%	519	21.5%	393	16.3%		
Simon De Jong	315	13.1%	289	12.0%				
Howard McCurdy	256	10.7%						
Ian Waddell	213	8.9%						
Roger Lagasse	53	2.2%						
Total	2,400	100.0%	2,417	100.0%	2,412	100.0%	2,388	100.0%

1988 Canadian federal election: Essex—Windsor
Party	Candidate	Votes	%	±%
New Democratic	Steven W. Langdon	18,926	44.1%	+4.8%
Liberal	Ray Robinet	17,715	41.3%	+12.2%
Progressive Conservative	Ted Aver	6,154	14.3%	-17.3%
Independent	Margaret Villamizar	98	0.2%	
Total valid votes		42,893	100.0%	

1984 Canadian federal election: Essex—Windsor
Party	Candidate	Votes	%	±%
New Democratic	Steven W. Langdon	18,746	39.3%	-0.5%
Progressive Conservative	John Martel	15,073	31.6%	+22.9%
Liberal	Brian Ducharme	13,866	29.1%	-22.2%
Total valid votes		47,685	100.0%	

1980 Canadian federal election: Essex—Windsor
Party	Candidate	Votes	%	±%
Liberal	Eugene Whelan	24,651	51.3%	+7.0%
New Democratic	Steven W. Langdon	19,123	39.8%	-0.7%
Progressive Conservative	Kathy Flood	4,184	8.7%	-6.2%
Marxist–Leninist	Peter Ewart	103	0.2%	-0.1%
Total valid votes		48,061	100.0%	
lop.parl.ca

1979 Canadian federal election: Essex—Windsor
Party	Candidate	Votes	%	±%
Liberal	Eugene Whelan	20,373	44.3%	-10.9%
New Democratic	Steven W. Langdon	18,603	40.4%	+5.0%
Progressive Conservative	Kathy Flood	6,875	14.9%	5.6%
Marxist–Leninist	Pete Ewart	144	0.3%	
Total valid votes		45,995	100.0%	
