= Chris Lewis (Canadian politician) =

Canadian politician

Chris Lewis MP

Member of Parliament for Essex
- Incumbent
- Assumed office October 21, 2019
- Preceded by: Tracey Ramsey

Personal details
- Born: June 15, 1976
- Party: Conservative Party of Canada
- Profession: Businessman, firefighter

Chris Lewis MP (born June 15, 1976) is a Canadian politician who was elected to represent the riding of Essex in the House of Commons of Canada in the 2019 Canadian federal election. He was re-elected in the 2021 and 2025 elections.

Before entering federal politics, Lewis was a municipal councillor in Kingsville, Ontario.

In 2022 under interim leader Candice Bergen, Lewis was appointed as Shadow Minister for Labour, after being appointed as Deputy Shadow Minister for Labour under leader Erin O’Toole.

== Electoral record ==
2025 Canadian federal election: Essex
Party	Candidate	Votes	%	±%	Expenditures
Conservative	Chris Lewis	46,123	57.5	+16.4	
Liberal	Chris Sutton	29,389	36.7	+21.2	
New Democratic	Lori Wightman	3,826	4.8	–27.0	
People's	Jason A. E. Henry	843	1.1	–8.8	
Total valid votes/expense limit		80,181	99.4	—	
Total rejected ballots		490	0.6	—	
Turnout		80,671	73.5	+6.6	
Eligible voters		109,799			
Conservative hold		Swing		–2.49	
Source: Elections Canada

2021 Canadian federal election: Essex
Party	Candidate	Votes	%	±%	Expenditures
Conservative	Chris Lewis	28,741	41.1	-0.3	$77,949.51
New Democratic	Tracey Ramsey	22,278	31.8	-2.8	$128,548.67
Liberal	Audrey Festeryga	10,813	15.5	-3.5	$43,341.69
People's	Beth Charron-Rowberry	6,925	9.9	+8.1	$20,675.80
Green	Nancy Pancheshan	865	1.2	-2.0	$0.00
Christian Heritage	Jeremy Palko	182	0.3	N/A	$7,077.73
Independent	Andrew George	172	0.2	N/A	$0.00
Total valid votes		69,976	99.4		
Total rejected ballots		406	0.6		
Turnout		70,382	66.9		
Eligible voters		105,281			
Conservative hold		Swing		+1.3	
Source: Elections Canada

2019 Canadian federal election: Essex
Party	Candidate	Votes	%	±%	Expenditures
Conservative	Chris Lewis	28,274	41.4	+5.86	$80,950.70
New Democratic	Tracey Ramsey	23,603	34.6	-6.92	$117,072.74
Liberal	Audrey Festeryga	12,987	19.0	-1.91	$41,233.04
Green	Jennifer Alderson	2,173	3.2	+1.28	none listed
People's	Bill Capes	1,251	1.8	–	$4,604.15
Total valid votes/expense limit		68,288	100.0		
Total rejected ballots		450			
Turnout		68,738	67.3		
Eligible voters		102,153			
Conservative gain from New Democratic		Swing		+6.39	
Source: Elections Canada

2018 Ontario general election: Essex
Party	Candidate	Votes	%	±%
New Democratic	Taras Natyshak	26,134	47.95	-12.39
Progressive Conservative	Chris Lewis	23,423	42.98	+21.16
Liberal	Kate Festeryga	3,026	5.55	-8.67
Green	Nancy Pancheshan	1,920	3.52	-0.10
Total valid votes		54,503	100.0	
New Democratic hold		Swing		-20.51
Source: Elections Ontario
