= Dave Epp =

Canadian politician

Dave Epp MP

Member of Parliament for Chatham-Kent—Leamington
- Incumbent
- Assumed office October 21, 2019
- Preceded by: Dave Van Kesteren

Personal details
- Born: June 10, 1962 (age 63) Leamington, Ontario, Canada
- Party: Conservative Party of Canada
- Spouse: Charlene Epp
- Profession: Farmer

David A. Epp MP (born June 10, 1962) is a Canadian politician who was elected to represent the riding of Chatham-Kent—Leamington in the House of Commons of Canada in the 2019 Canadian federal election. He is a farmer in Leamington, Ontario.

== Electoral record ==
2025 Canadian federal election: Chatham-Kent—Leamington
Party	Candidate	Votes	%	±%	Expenditures
Conservative	Dave Epp	41,612	57.5	+15.08	
Liberal	Keith Pickard	25,978	35.9	+9.17	
New Democratic	Seamus McInnis Fleming	2,943	4.1	–10.54	
People's	Trevor Lee	1,061	1.5	–13.24	
Green	James Plunkett	757	1.0	–0.47	
Total valid votes/expense limit		72,351	99.4	+0.1	
Total rejected ballots		444	0.6	-0.1	
Turnout		72,795	68.5	+4.7	
Eligible voters		106,351			
Conservative hold		Swing		+2.96	
Source: CBC, Elections Canada

2021 Canadian federal election: Chatham-Kent—Leamington
Party	Candidate	Votes	%	±%	Expenditures
Conservative	Dave Epp	22,435	40.9	-6.0	$77,018.86
Liberal	Greg Hetherington	15,683	28.6	-2.6	$82,487.05
New Democratic	Dan Gelinas	8,007	14.6	-0.6	$4,338.12
People's	Liz Vallee	7,892	14.4	+12.4	$17,320.60
Green	Mark Vercouteren	837	1.5	-2.6	$0.75
Total valid votes/expense limit		54,854	99.3	–	$115,717.06
Total rejected ballots		400	0.7		
Turnout		55,254	63.8		
Eligible voters		86,615			
Conservative hold		Swing		-1.7	
Source: Elections Canada

2019 Canadian federal election: Chatham-Kent—Leamington
Party	Candidate	Votes	%	±%	Expenditures
Conservative	Dave Epp	25,359	46.9	+5.19	$112,325.66
Liberal	Katie Omstead	16,899	31.2	-6.03	none listed
New Democratic	Tony Walsh	8,229	15.2	-3.17	$3,959.54
Green	Mark Vercouteren	2,233	4.1	+1.42	$372.30
People's	John Balagtas	1,061	2.0	-	$1,212.06
Marijuana	Paul Coulbeck	307	0.6	-	$0.00
Total valid votes/expense limit		54,088	100.0		
Total rejected ballots		450			
Turnout		54,538	63.3		
Eligible voters		86,165			
Conservative hold		Swing		+5.61	
Source: Elections Canada
