= Susan Whelan (politician) =

Canadian politician

Susan Elizabeth Whelan, PC (/ˈhwiːlən/; born May 5, 1963, in Windsor, Ontario) is a former Liberal Member of Parliament (MP). Whelan, a lawyer, first won a seat in the House of Commons in the 1993 election representing Essex—Windsor. In 1997 and 2000 she was elected to represent Essex. In 2002, she was appointed Minister for International Cooperation by Prime Minister Jean Chrétien.

In 2004, Whelan was defeated by Jeff Watson of the Conservative Party. She unsuccessfully tried to win back the seat in the elections of 2006 and 2008.

Susan Whelan's late father, the Honourable Eugene Whelan, was an MP for the same area from 1962 to 1984 and served as Minister of Agriculture in the cabinet of Pierre Trudeau from 1972 to 1984. Susan and her father hold the distinction of being the first father-daughter cabinet appointees.

Whelan shares her father's passionate interest in Canadian agriculture, having made Agriculture and Rural Development one of the key elements of policy during her tenure as minister.

After she left parliament in 2004, Whelan instructed part-time at the University of Windsor in the political science department and represented the Ambassador Bridge company when it was opposing construction of the Gordie Howe International Bridge.

On June 1, 2009 Whelan was named chief executive officer for the Ontario division of the Canadian Cancer Society. She resigned on September 30 of the same year, following a diagnosis of breast cancer, in order to focus on her recovery.

Whelan was previously the executive director of rare Charitable Research Reserve in Cambridge, Ontario, and maintains a law practice in Windsor.

== Electoral record ==
2004 Canadian federal election: Essex
Party	Candidate	Votes	%	±%
Conservative	Jeff Watson	18,755	36.6%	-4.9%
Liberal	Susan Whelan	17,926	35.0%	-9.4%
New Democratic	David Tremblay	12,519	24.4%	+10.5%
Green	Paul Forman	1,981	3.9%	
Marxist–Leninist	Robert Cruise	105	0.2%	-0.1%
Total valid votes		51,286	100.0%	

Note: Conservative vote is compared to the total of the Canadian Alliance vote and Progressive Conservative vote in 2000 election.

2000 Canadian federal election: Essex
Party	Candidate	Votes	%	±%
Liberal	Susan Whelan	20,524	44.3%	-1.7%
Alliance	Scott Cowan	16,019	34.6%	+16.7%
New Democratic	Marion Overholt	6,431	13.9%	-15.7%
Progressive Conservative	Merrill Baker	3,175	6.9%	+0.4%
Marxist–Leninist	Robert Cruise	152	0.3%	
Total valid votes		46,301	100.0%	

Note: Canadian Alliance vote is compared to the Reform vote in 1997 election.

1997 Canadian federal election: Essex
Party	Candidate	Votes	%	±%
Liberal	Susan Whelan	22,052	46.1%	-9.1%
New Democratic	Gerry Bastien	14,180	29.6%	+1.9%
Reform	John Larsen	8,545	17.9%	+4.7%
Progressive Conservative	Dave Wylupek	3,086	6.4%	+3.2%
Total valid votes		47,863	100.0%	

1993 Canadian federal election: Essex—Windsor
Party	Candidate	Votes	%	±%
Liberal	Susan Whelan	25,200	55.1%	+13.8%
New Democratic	Steven W. Langdon	12,650	27.7%	-16.4%
Reform	John Larsen	6,029	13.2%	
Progressive Conservative	Brian Payne	1,481	3.2%	-11.1%
National	George Opacic	194	0.4%	
Marxist–Leninist	Paul Hawkins	83	0.2%	
Commonwealth of Canada	Vlado Zugaj	67	0.1%	
Total valid votes		45,704	100.0%	

26th Canadian Ministry (1993–2003) – Cabinet of Jean Chrétien
Cabinet post (1)
Predecessor	Office	Successor
Maria Minna	Minister for International Cooperation; 2002–2003	Aileen Carroll
Parliament of Canada
Preceded by Electoral district created in 1996	Member of Parliament for Essex; 1996–2004	Succeeded by Jeff Watson, Conservative
Preceded by Steven Langdon, New Democratic Party	Member of Parliament for Essex-Windsor; 1993–1996	Succeeded by Riding abolished in 1996
