= Jeff Watson (politician) =

Canadian politician

Jeffrey D. Watson
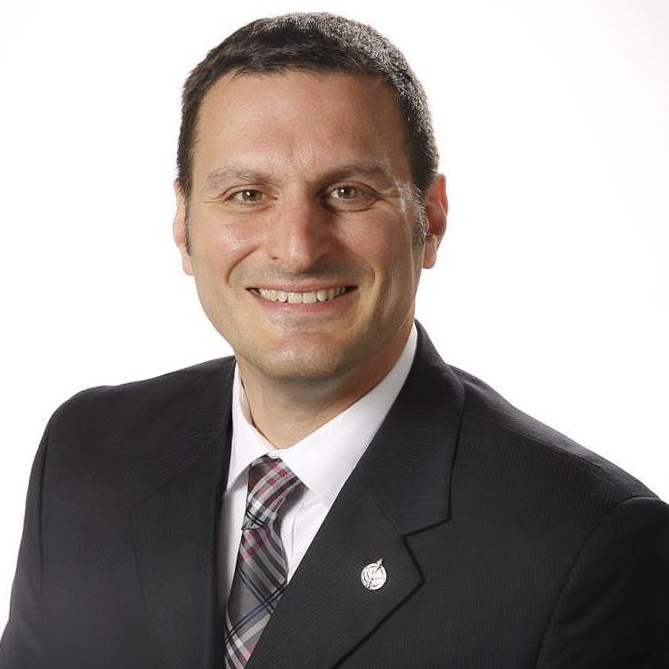

Member of Parliament for Essex
- In office June 28, 2004 – August 4, 2015
- Preceded by: Susan Whelan
- Succeeded by: Tracey Ramsey

Personal details
- Born: March 25, 1971 (age 55) Windsor, Ontario
- Party: Conservative
- Spouse: Sarah Anne Watson (née Thomson)
- Children: Sophie, Emma, Elijah, Thaddaeus, Ava, Beatrice (adopted)
- Profession: Political analyst, marketing manager, autoworker
- Website: jeffwatson.ca

Jeffrey D. "Jeff" Watson (born March 25, 1971, in Windsor, Ontario) is a Canadian politician who served as the Member of Parliament for the Essex electoral district in Ontario, from 2004 to 2015.

In the 2015 general election, and after four terms in office, Watson narrowly lost his seat to the NDP. The Watsons relocated to Calgary, Alberta after the election loss.

Watson and his wife Sarah have six children.

As a Member of Parliament, he voted against same-sex marriage and took hardline conservative positions on many social issues.

== Member of Parliament for Essex, Ontario, 2004-2015 ==
Watson was first elected as the Member of Parliament for Essex in June 2004 and re-elected in January 2006 and October 2008 as a member of the Conservative Government led by Prime Minister Stephen Harper. Watson was the first centre-right MP elected for Essex or its predecessors in 46 years. He also had the distinction of being designated by the Library of Parliament as the first autoworker elected to the Parliament of Canada.

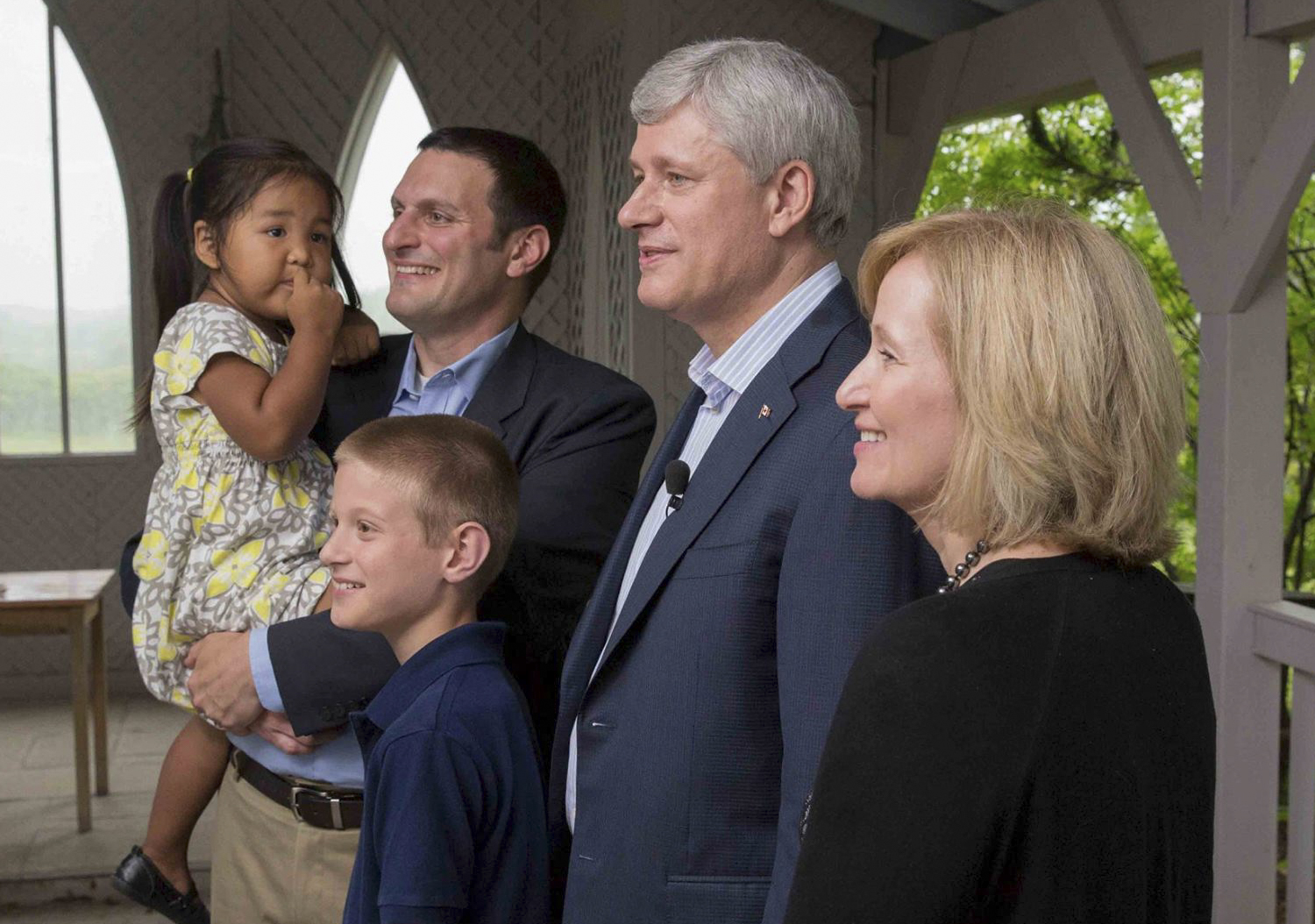
Steven and Laureen Harper with Jeff Watson and Watson's children, adopted daughter Beatrice and eldest son, Elijah.

Watson served on the Standing Committee on the Environment & Sustainable Development and on the Standing Committee on Transportation, Infrastructure & Communities. He was also Chair of the Government Auto Caucus, a member of the All-Party border Caucus, and the Canada-UK, Canada-Italy Inter-Parliamentary Groups. As well he served as a member of the Executive and Vice-Chair respectively as a member of the Canada-Israel and Canada-US Inter-Parliamentary Groups.

In February 2007, Watson came under criticism for comments made at a hearing of the Special Legislative Committee on Canada's Clean Air Act that linked greenhouse gas reductions to a demise in the Canadian economy which could result in domestic violence and suicide. While in April 2007, the government tabled a report detailing how C-288 will plunge Canada into a recession costing 275,000 jobs, echoing the MPs concerns.

Following his studies in history and political science at the University of Windsor, Watson worked as an executive assistant and marketing director before joining the line at the Trim Division at Daimler Chrysler's Windsor Assembly Plant, where he was employed for seven years.

In January 2007, the Windsor Star reported that a former campaign worker from Watson's 2004 campaign threatened he would "kill Jeff Watson with (his) bare hands", was charged by the Ontario Provincial Police and sent to trial. The defendant was later acquitted as the Ontario court judge, Justice Lloyd Dean, could not conclude beyond a reasonable doubt that the words were spoken to intimidate or strike fear. "I had to deal with whether or not the matter was before the court because the young ladies [the witnesses] were fearful of Mr. Kouvalis or assessing what move to make and what evidence to give because they were concerned about the political consequences for Mr. Kouvalis, Mr. Watson and the Conservative party", the judge said.

The case was complicated by the admission in court that "Witness Kaydee Schnekenburger, a former campaign worker for Watson ... testified earlier in the trial that she and Angela Jonsson, another witness .. met with Watson and his wife, Sarah, at the MP's home for three hours and discussed the sequence of events in the case.

Watson was re-elected in the 2008 federal election. He became Parliamentary Secretary to the Minister of Transport on September 19, 2013.

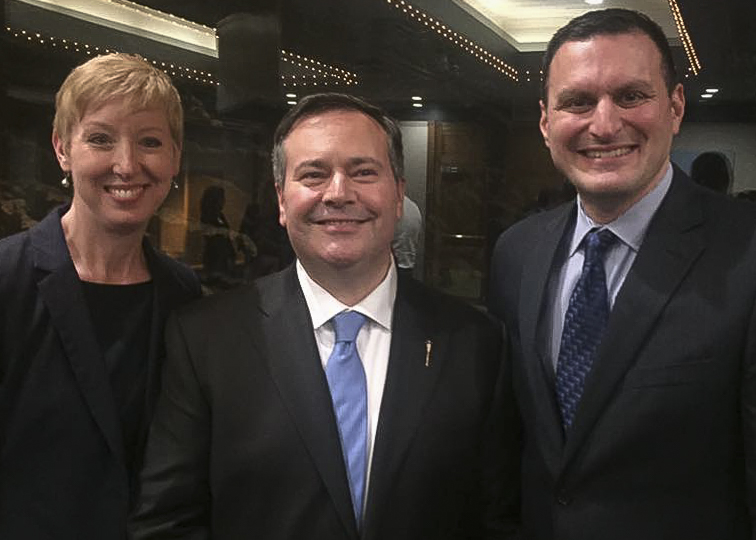
Jeff and Sarah Watson, with Jason Kenney

In May 2015, the Jewish National Fund Windsor honoured Jeff Watson. "Over 500 people attended the event to pay tribute to Mr. Watson for his great work in serving [the Jewish] community and for his strong support of Israel. .. with a fascinating keynote address from The Honourable Jason Kenney."

Watson was defeated in 2015 by the New Democratic Party, despite a Liberal Party majority elsewhere in the country.

== 2015-present ==
In 2015, the Watsons relocated to Calgary, Alberta for their Children. Watson stated "The kids, some of them want to ride horses. My boys, 11 and 13 — they want to mountain bike extreme style. One of them wants to snowboard." Watson continued to on, "Asked if he’ll be getting into politics in Alberta, Watson said he’ll likely help out on the campaigns of friends like fellow Conservative Jason Kenney"

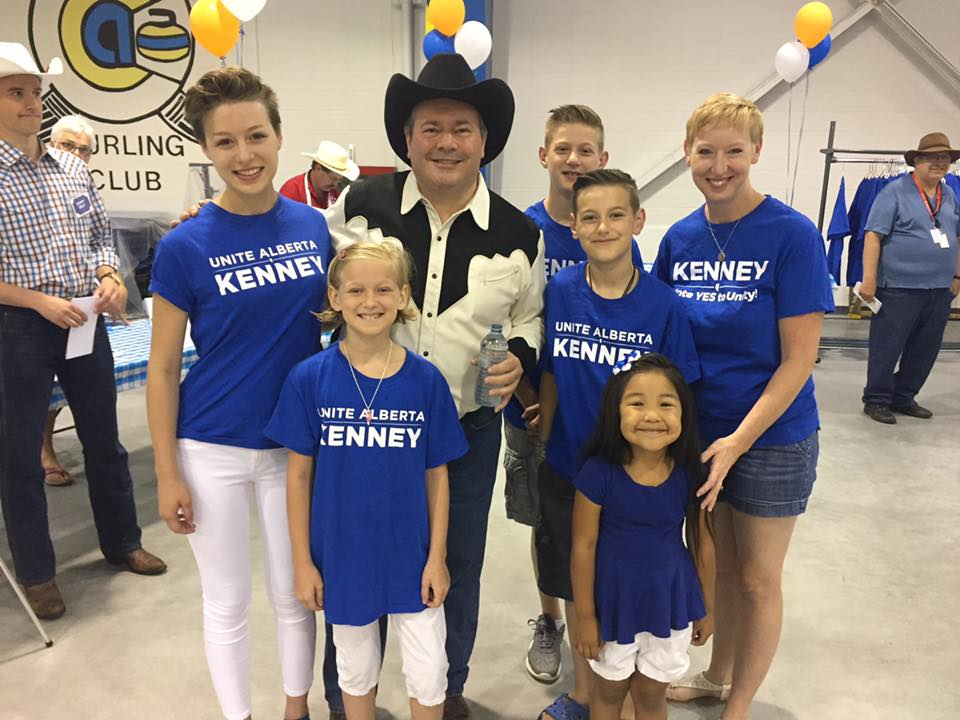
Jason Kenney with the Watson's children during Kenney's 2017 Campaign

In 2017, Watson become the Director, Coalitions and Outreach for Unite Alberta / Jason Kenney Leadership.

In addition to being a member of Jason Kenney's campaign leadership team during 2016–17, Watson has also continued his work in Federal Politics and acts as an advisor to the Hon. Andrew Scheer.

Watson is also working with Ric McIver in the United Conservative Party held riding of Calgary-Hays as a Constituency Assistant.

== Electoral record ==
2015 Canadian federal election: Essex
Party	Candidate	Votes	%	±%	Expenditures
New Democratic	Tracey Ramsey	25,072	41.42	+6.52	$106,087.64
Conservative	Jeff Watson	21,602	35.69	-12.58	$87,656.45
Liberal	Audrey Festeryga	12,639	20.88	+6.62	$78,480.89
Green	Jennifer Alderson	1,141	1.88	-0.54	–
Marxist–Leninist	Enver Villamizar	77	0.13	-0.02	–
Total valid votes/expense limit		60,531	100.00		$233,865.23
Total rejected ballots		241	0.40	–	
Turnout		60,772	66.19	–	
Eligible voters		91,816			
New Democratic gain from Conservative		Swing		+9.55	
Source: Elections Canada

2011 Canadian federal election: Essex
Party	Candidate	Votes	%	±%
Conservative	Jeff Watson	25,327	48.1%	+8.1%
New Democratic	Taras Natyshak	18,538	35.2%	+8.6%
Liberal	Nelson Santos	7,465	14.2%	-14.9%
Green	Cora Carriveau	1,290	2.4%	-1.9%
Marxist–Leninist	Enver Villamizar	77	0.1%	-0.1%
Total valid votes		52,697	99.6%	
Total rejected ballots		233	0.4%	
Total votes		52,930	100.0%	

Source: Elections Canada

2008 Canadian federal election: Essex
Party	Candidate	Votes	%	±%	Expenditures
Conservative	Jeff Watson	20,608	40.0%	-0.4%	$87,306
Liberal	Susan Whelan	14,973	29.1%	-5.0%	$87,544
New Democratic	Taras Natyshak	13,703	26.6%	+3.9%	$47,430
Green	Richard Bachynsky	2,234	4.3%	+1.6%	$0
Total valid votes/expense limit		51,518	100.0%	$90,595	
Total rejected ballots		206			
Turnout		51,724	%		

2006 Canadian federal election: Essex
Party	Candidate	Votes	%	±%
Conservative	Jeff Watson	23,125	40.4%	+3.8%
Liberal	Susan Whelan	19,508	34.1%	-0.9%
New Democratic	Taras Natyshak	12,992	22.7%	-1.7%
Green	James McVeity	1,518	2.7%	-1.2%
Marxist–Leninist	Robert Cruise	108	0.2%	0.0%
Total valid votes		57,251		
Total valid votes		57,251	100.0%	

2004 Canadian federal election: Essex
Party	Candidate	Votes	%	±%
Conservative	Jeff Watson	18,755	36.6%	-4.9%
Liberal	Susan Whelan	17,926	35.0%	-9.4%
New Democratic	David Tremblay	12,519	24.4%	+10.5%
Green	Paul Forman	1,981	3.9%	
Marxist–Leninist	Robert Cruise	105	0.2%	-0.1%
Total valid votes		51,286	100.0%	

Note: Conservative vote is compared to the total of the Canadian Alliance vote and Progressive Conservative vote in 2000 election.
