= Essex (federal electoral district) =

Federal electoral district in Ontario, Canada

Coordinates: 42.128°N 82.787°W

Ontario electoral district
- Interactive map of riding boundaries from the 2025 federal election

Federal electoral district
- Legislature: House of Commons
MP
Chris Lewis
Conservative
- District created: 1966
- First contested: 1968
- Last contested: 2021
- District webpage: profile, map

Demographics
- Population (2016): 125,442
- Electors (2015): 90,591
- Area (km²): 1,177
- Pop. density (per km²): 106.6
- Census division: Essex
- Census subdivision(s): Lakeshore (part), LaSalle, Amherstburg, Kingsville, Essex

Essex (formerly known as Essex—Windsor) is a federal electoral district in Ontario, Canada, represented in the House of Commons of Canada from 1867 to 1882 and since 1968.

== Geography ==
The riding includes the Municipalities of LaSalle, Amherstburg, Essex, Kingsville, and the western/central portion of Lakeshore. See Elections Canada map.

== History ==
Essex was created in the British North America Act 1867. It consisted of Essex County. It was abolished in 1882 when it was redistributed into Essex North and Essex South ridings.

Essex was re-created in 1966 from Essex East, Essex South and Essex West. The new riding consisted initially of the Town of Essex, the Townships of Anderdon, Colchester North, Colchester South, Malden, Rochester, Sandwich South, Tilbury North and Tilbury West, and the southern parts of the Township of Sandwich West and the City of Windsor, and the southeastern part of the Township of Maidstone. The name of the electoral district was changed in 1972 to "Essex—Windsor".

In 1976, the riding was re-defined to consist of the Townships of Anderdon, Colchester North, Maidstone, Malden, Rochester, Sandwich South, Sandwich West, Tilbury North and Tilbury West, including the Town of Essex, but excluding the Town of Tecumseh and the Village of St. Clair Beach, and the southeast part of the City of Windsor.

In 1987, the riding was re-defined to consist of the southeastern part of the City of Windsor, the towns of Amherstburg, Belle River and Essex, and the townships of Anderdon, Maidstone, Malden, Rochester, Sandwich South, Sandwich West, Tilbury North and Tilbury West.

Essex—Windsor was abolished in 1996 when it was re-distributed between a new "Essex" riding and Windsor West. The new Essex riding was created from parts of Essex—Windsor and Essex—Kent ridings.

It consisted initially of Pelee Island and the County of Essex excluding the City of Windsor, the towns of Leamington and Tecumseh, the Village of St. Clair Beach and the Township of Mersea. In 2003, it was redefined to consist of the County of Essex excluding the City of Windsor and the towns of Leamington and Tecumseh.

This riding lost territory to Chatham-Kent—Leamington during the 2012 electoral redistribution. Namely, Pelee Island and the eastern portion of the Town of Lakeshore.

=== Members of Parliament ===
This riding has elected the following members of Parliament:

Parliament	Years	Member	Party
Essex
1st	1867–1872	John O'Connor	Conservative
2nd	1872–1874	John O'Connor	Conservative
3rd	1874–1878	William McGregor	Liberal
4th	1878–1882	J.C. Patterson	Conservative
Riding dissolved into Essex North and Essex South
Essex; Riding re-created from Essex East, Essex South and Essex West
28th	1968–1972	Eugene Whelan	Liberal
Essex—Windsor
29th	1972–1974	Eugene Whelan	Liberal
30th	1974–1979	Eugene Whelan	Liberal
31st	1979–1980	Eugene Whelan	Liberal
32nd	1980–1984	Eugene Whelan	Liberal
33rd	1984–1988	Steven W. Langdon	New Democratic
34th	1988–1993	Steven W. Langdon	New Democratic
35th	1993–1997	Susan Whelan	Liberal
Essex
36th	1997–2000	Susan Whelan	Liberal
37th	2000–2004	Susan Whelan	Liberal
38th	2004–2006	Jeff Watson	Conservative
39th	2006–2008	Jeff Watson	Conservative
40th	2008–2011	Jeff Watson	Conservative
41st	2011–2015	Jeff Watson	Conservative
42nd	2015–2019	Tracey Ramsey	New Democratic
43rd	2019–2021	Chris Lewis	Conservative
44th	2021–2025	Chris Lewis	Conservative
45th	2025–present	Chris Lewis	Conservative

== Demographics ==
According to the 2021 Canadian census

Languages: 82.5% English, 2.4% French, 1.8% Italian, 1.2% Arabic, 1.1% German

Religions: 68.6% Christian (42.7% Catholic, 4.2% Anglican, 3.9% United Church, 1.8% Christian Orthodox, 1.6% Baptist, 1.3% Pentecostal, 1.0% Presbyterian, 1.0% Lutheran, 11.1% Other), 2.5% Muslim, 1.0% Sikh, 26.6% None

Median income: $46,400 (2020)

Average income: $59,700 (2020)

Panethnic groups in Essex (2011−2021)
Panethnic group	2021		2016		2011	
Panethnic group	Pop.	%	Pop.	%	Pop.	%
European (Note: Statistic includes all persons that did not make up part of a visible minority or an indigenous identity.)	114,600	86.47%	111,800	91.18%	110,360	93.45%
Indigenous	4,135	3.12%	3,155	2.57%	1,970	1.67%
South Asian	3,785	2.86%	1,630	1.33%	1,095	0.93%
Middle Eastern (Note: Statistic includes total responses of "West Asian" and "Arab" under visible minority section on census.)	3,105	2.34%	1,290	1.05%	1,040	0.88%
African	1,920	1.45%	1,645	1.34%	1,155	0.98%
East Asian (Note: Statistic includes total responses of "Chinese", "Korean", and "Japanese" under visible minority section on census.)	1,910	1.44%	1,355	1.11%	980	0.83%
Southeast Asian (Note: Statistic includes total responses of "Filipino" and "Southeast Asian" under visible minority section on census.)	1,505	1.14%	845	0.69%	800	0.68%
Latin American	840	0.63%	415	0.34%	405	0.34%
Other/multiracial (Note: Statistic includes total responses of "Visible minority, n.i.e." and "Multiple visible minorities" under visible minority section on census.)	725	0.55%	490	0.4%	285	0.24%
Total responses	132,535	98.42%	122,615	97.75%	118,090	98.02%
Total population	134,656	100%	125,442	100%	120,477	100%
Notes: Totals greater than 100% due to multiple origin responses. Demographics based on 2012 Canadian federal electoral redistribution riding boundaries.

== Election results ==
=== Essex 1996–present ===
Graph of election results in Essex (1997-, minor parties that never got 2% of the vote or didn't run consistently are omitted)

2025 Canadian federal election
Party	Candidate	Votes	%	±%	Expenditures
Conservative	Chris Lewis	46,123	57.5	+16.4	
Liberal	Chris Sutton	29,389	36.7	+21.2	
New Democratic	Lori Wightman	3,826	4.8	–27.0	
People's	Jason A. E. Henry	843	1.1	–8.8	
Total valid votes/expense limit		80,181	99.4	—	
Total rejected ballots		490	0.6	—	
Turnout		80,671	73.5	+6.6	
Eligible voters		109,799			
Conservative hold		Swing		–2.49	
Source: Elections Canada

2021 Canadian federal election
Party	Candidate	Votes	%	±%	Expenditures
Conservative	Chris Lewis	28,741	41.1	-0.3	$77,949.51
New Democratic	Tracey Ramsey	22,278	31.8	-2.8	$128,548.67
Liberal	Audrey Festeryga	10,813	15.5	-3.5	$43,341.69
People's	Beth Charron-Rowberry	6,925	9.9	+8.1	$20,675.80
Green	Nancy Pancheshan	865	1.2	-2.0	$0.00
Christian Heritage	Jeremy Palko	182	0.3	N/A	$7,077.73
Independent	Andrew George	172	0.2	N/A	$0.00
Total valid votes		69,976	99.4		
Total rejected ballots		406	0.6		
Turnout		70,382	66.9		
Eligible voters		105,281			
Conservative hold		Swing		+1.3	
Source: Elections Canada

2021 federal election redistributed results
Party	Vote	%
Conservative	27,900	40.96
New Democratic	21,623	31.66
Liberal	10,554	15.45
People's	6,968	10.20
Green	843	1.23
Others	337	0.49

2019 Canadian federal election
Party	Candidate	Votes	%	±%	Expenditures
Conservative	Chris Lewis	28,274	41.4	+5.86	$80,950.70
New Democratic	Tracey Ramsey	23,603	34.6	-6.92	$117,072.74
Liberal	Audrey Festeryga	12,987	19.0	-1.91	$41,233.04
Green	Jennifer Alderson	2,173	3.2	+1.28	none listed
People's	Bill Capes	1,251	1.8	–	$4,604.15
Total valid votes/expense limit		68,288	100.0		
Total rejected ballots		450			
Turnout		68,738	67.3		
Eligible voters		102,153			
Conservative gain from New Democratic		Swing		+6.39	
Source: Elections Canada

2015 Canadian federal election
Party	Candidate	Votes	%	±%	Expenditures
New Democratic	Tracey Ramsey	25,072	41.42	+6.52	$106,087.64
Conservative	Jeff Watson	21,602	35.69	-12.58	$87,656.45
Liberal	Audrey Festeryga	12,639	20.88	+6.62	$78,480.89
Green	Jennifer Alderson	1,141	1.88	-0.54	–
Marxist–Leninist	Enver Villamizar	77	0.13	-0.02	–
Total valid votes/expense limit		60,531	100.00		$233,865.23
Total rejected ballots		241	0.40	–	
Turnout		60,772	66.19	–	
Eligible voters		91,816			
New Democratic gain from Conservative		Swing		+9.55	
Source: Elections Canada

2011 federal election redistributed results
Party	Vote	%
Conservative	24,239	48.27
New Democratic	17,528	34.90
Liberal	7,162	14.26
Green	1,217	2.42
Others	73	0.15

2011 Canadian federal election
Party	Candidate	Votes	%	±%
Conservative	Jeff Watson	25,327	48.1%	+8.1%
New Democratic	Taras Natyshak	18,538	35.2%	+8.6%
Liberal	Nelson Santos	7,465	14.2%	-14.9%
Green	Cora Carriveau	1,290	2.4%	-1.9%
Marxist–Leninist	Enver Villamizar	77	0.1%	-0.1%
Total valid votes		52,697	99.6%	
Total rejected ballots		233	0.4%	
Total votes		52,930	100.0%	

Source: Elections Canada

2008 Canadian federal election
Party	Candidate	Votes	%	±%	Expenditures
Conservative	Jeff Watson	20,608	40.0%	-0.4%	$87,306
Liberal	Susan Whelan	14,973	29.1%	-5.0%	$87,544
New Democratic	Taras Natyshak	13,703	26.6%	+3.9%	$47,430
Green	Richard Bachynsky	2,234	4.3%	+1.6%	$0
Total valid votes/expense limit		51,518	100.0%	$90,595	
Total rejected ballots		206			
Turnout		51,724	%		

2006 Canadian federal election
Party	Candidate	Votes	%	±%
Conservative	Jeff Watson	23,125	40.4%	+3.8%
Liberal	Susan Whelan	19,508	34.1%	-0.9%
New Democratic	Taras Natyshak	12,992	22.7%	-1.7%
Green	James McVeity	1,518	2.7%	-1.2%
Marxist–Leninist	Robert Cruise	108	0.2%	0.0%
Total valid votes		57,251		
Total valid votes		57,251	100.0%	

2004 Canadian federal election
Party	Candidate	Votes	%	±%
Conservative	Jeff Watson	18,755	36.6%	-4.9%
Liberal	Susan Whelan	17,926	35.0%	-9.4%
New Democratic	David Tremblay	12,519	24.4%	+10.5%
Green	Paul Forman	1,981	3.9%	
Marxist–Leninist	Robert Cruise	105	0.2%	-0.1%
Total valid votes		51,286	100.0%	

Note: Conservative vote is compared to the total of the Canadian Alliance vote and Progressive Conservative vote in 2000 election.

2000 Canadian federal election
Party	Candidate	Votes	%	±%
Liberal	Susan Whelan	20,524	44.3%	-1.7%
Alliance	Scott Cowan	16,019	34.6%	+16.7%
New Democratic	Marion Overholt	6,431	13.9%	-15.7%
Progressive Conservative	Merrill Baker	3,175	6.9%	+0.4%
Marxist–Leninist	Robert Cruise	152	0.3%	
Total valid votes		46,301	100.0%	

Note: Canadian Alliance vote is compared to the Reform vote in 1997 election.

1997 Canadian federal election
Party	Candidate	Votes	%	±%
Liberal	Susan Whelan	22,052	46.1%	-9.1%
New Democratic	Gerry Bastien	14,180	29.6%	+1.9%
Reform	John Larsen	8,545	17.9%	+4.7%
Progressive Conservative	Dave Wylupek	3,086	6.4%	+3.2%
Total valid votes		47,863	100.0%	

=== Essex—Windsor 1970–1996 ===
Graph of election results in Essex/Essex—Windsor (1968-1993, minor parties that never got 2% of the vote or didn't run consistently are omitted)

1993 Canadian federal election
Party	Candidate	Votes	%	±%
Liberal	Susan Whelan	25,200	55.1%	+13.8%
New Democratic	Steven W. Langdon	12,650	27.7%	-16.4%
Reform	John Larsen	6,029	13.2%	
Progressive Conservative	Brian Payne	1,481	3.2%	-11.1%
National	George Opacic	194	0.4%	
Marxist–Leninist	Paul Hawkins	83	0.2%	
Commonwealth of Canada	Vlado Zugaj	67	0.1%	
Total valid votes		45,704	100.0%	

1988 Canadian federal election
Party	Candidate	Votes	%	±%
New Democratic	Steven W. Langdon	18,926	44.1%	+4.8%
Liberal	Ray Robinet	17,715	41.3%	+12.2%
Progressive Conservative	Ted Aver	6,154	14.3%	-17.3%
Independent	Margaret Villamizar	98	0.2%	
Total valid votes		42,893	100.0%	

1984 Canadian federal election: Essex—Windsor
Party	Candidate	Votes	%	±%
New Democratic	Steven W. Langdon	18,746	39.3%	-0.5%
Progressive Conservative	John Martel	15,073	31.6%	+22.9%
Liberal	Brian Ducharme	13,866	29.1%	-22.2%
Total valid votes		47,685	100.0%	

1980 Canadian federal election
Party	Candidate	Votes	%	±%
Liberal	Eugene Whelan	24,651	51.3%	+7.0%
New Democratic	Steven W. Langdon	19,123	39.8%	-0.7%
Progressive Conservative	Kathy Flood	4,184	8.7%	-6.2%
Marxist–Leninist	Peter Ewart	103	0.2%	-0.1%
Total valid votes		48,061	100.0%	
lop.parl.ca

1979 Canadian federal election
Party	Candidate	Votes	%	±%
Liberal	Eugene Whelan	20,373	44.3%	-10.9%
New Democratic	Steven W. Langdon	18,603	40.4%	+5.0%
Progressive Conservative	Kathy Flood	6,875	14.9%	5.6%
Marxist–Leninist	Pete Ewart	144	0.3%	
Total valid votes		45,995	100.0%	

1974 Canadian federal election
Party	Candidate	Votes	%	±%
Liberal	Eugene Whelan	24,357	55.2%	+7.1%
New Democratic	Charles Brooks	15,656	35.5%	-4.6%
Progressive Conservative	Dennis Herring	4,148	9.4%	-2.6%
Total valid votes		44,161	100.0%	

1972 Canadian federal election
Party	Candidate	Votes	%	±%
Liberal	Eugene Whelan	19,793	48.0%	-1.7%
New Democratic	Ralph N. Wensley	16,503	40.0%	+8.3%
Progressive Conservative	Edmund A. Michael	4,929	12.0%	-6.6%
Total valid votes		41,225	100.0%	

=== Essex 1966–1970 ===
1968 Canadian federal election
Party	Candidate	Votes	%
Liberal	Eugene Whelan	14,707	49.7%
New Democratic	Ralph N. Wensley	9,399	31.8%
Progressive Conservative	Tom Taylor	5,485	18.5%
Total valid votes		29,591	100.0%

=== Essex 1867–1882 ===
Graph of election results in Essex (1867-1878, minor parties that never got 2% of the vote or didn't run consistently are omitted)

1878 Canadian federal election
Party	Candidate	Votes	%	±%
Conservative	J.C. Patterson	2,596	52.5%	
Liberal	William McGregor	2,318	46.9%	-23.2%
Unknown	J.H. Morgan	27	0.5%	
Total valid votes		4,941	100.0%	
Source: Canadian Elections Database

Canadian federal by-election, 22 October 1874
Party	Candidate	Votes	%	±%
On Mr. McGregor being unseated on petition, 26 August 1874
Liberal	William McGregor	1,763	70.2%	+11.4%
Unknown	Jeremiah O'Connor	750	29.8%	-11.4%
Total valid votes		2,513	100.0%	

1874 Canadian federal election
Party	Candidate	Votes	%	±%
Liberal	William McGregor	2,508	58.7%	
Unknown	John O'Connor	1,763	41.3%	
Total valid votes		4,271	100.0%	
Source: lop.parl.ca

1872 Canadian federal election
Party	Candidate	Votes	%	±%
Conservative	John O'Connor	1,999	61.8%	+11.6%
Unknown	Arthur Rankin	1,238	38.2%	-11.6%
Total valid votes		3,237	100.0%	
Source: Canadian Elections Database

1867 Canadian federal election
Party	Candidate	Votes	%
Conservative	John O'Connor	1,439	50.1%
Liberal	Arthur Rankin	1,432	49.9%
Total valid votes		2,871	100.0%
Source: Canadian Elections Database

== Student vote results ==
2025 Essex student vote
57.11%	25.31%	12.62%	4.96%
Conservative	Liberal	NDP	PPC

== See also ==
- List of Canadian electoral districts
- Historical federal electoral districts of Canada
