= Susan Whelan =

Susan Whelan may refer to:

- Susan Whelan (politician) (born 1963), Canadian member of parliament
- Susan Whelan (executive) (born c. 1964), Irish executive, CEO of Leicester City, 2010–2025
