= Tracey Ramsey =

Trade Union Organizer/Previous Member of Parliament

Member of Parliament for Essex
- In office October 19, 2015 – October 21, 2019

Personal details
- Born: April 14, 1971 (age 55) Kingsville, Ontario, Canada
- Party: New Democratic Party
- Spouse: Germaine
- Occupation: Women's Director, Unifor the Union

Tracey Ramsey (born April 14, 1971) is a former Member of Parliament who represented the riding of Essex in the House of Commons of Canada for one term, from the 2015 Canadian federal election until 2019. In the 42nd Canadian Parliament, Ramsey served as the International Trade Critic, Justice Critic and Deputy Labour Critic. As Vice Chairperson of the International Standing Committee on Trade she was involved heavily in the legislative process for CUSMA, CPTPP and CETA. Ramsey introduced private member bill C-439, titled National Freshwater Strategy Act, which sought to require the Minister of Environment to develop a national strategy for the conservation, protection, and use of freshwater.

Prior to her election, she worked for Ford Motor Company for 19 years. She is a graduate of practical nursing from St. Clair College of Applied Arts and Technology. Tracey is currently the National Women's Director, following two years as union organizer with Unifor the Union, Canada's largest private sector union.

== Election results ==
2021 Canadian federal election: Essex
Party	Candidate	Votes	%	±%	Expenditures
Conservative	Chris Lewis	28,741	41.1	-0.3	$77,949.51
New Democratic	Tracey Ramsey	22,278	31.8	-2.8	$128,548.67
Liberal	Audrey Festeryga	10,813	15.5	-3.5	$43,341.69
People's	Beth Charron-Rowberry	6,925	9.9	+8.1	$20,675.80
Green	Nancy Pancheshan	865	1.2	-2.0	$0.00
Christian Heritage	Jeremy Palko	182	0.3	N/A	$7,077.73
Independent	Andrew George	172	0.2	N/A	$0.00
Total valid votes		69,976	99.4		
Total rejected ballots		406	0.6		
Turnout		70,382	66.9		
Eligible voters		105,281			
Conservative hold		Swing		+1.3	
Source: Elections Canada

2019 Canadian federal election: Essex
Party	Candidate	Votes	%	±%	Expenditures
Conservative	Chris Lewis	28,274	41.4	+5.86	$80,950.70
New Democratic	Tracey Ramsey	23,603	34.6	-6.92	$117,072.74
Liberal	Audrey Festeryga	12,987	19.0	-1.91	$41,233.04
Green	Jennifer Alderson	2,173	3.2	+1.28	none listed
People's	Bill Capes	1,251	1.8	–	$4,604.15
Total valid votes/expense limit		68,288	100.0		
Total rejected ballots		450			
Turnout		68,738	67.3		
Eligible voters		102,153			
Conservative gain from New Democratic		Swing		+6.39	
Source: Elections Canada

2015 Canadian federal election: Essex
Party	Candidate	Votes	%	±%	Expenditures
New Democratic	Tracey Ramsey	25,072	41.42	+6.52	$106,087.64
Conservative	Jeff Watson	21,602	35.69	-12.58	$87,656.45
Liberal	Audrey Festeryga	12,639	20.88	+6.62	$78,480.89
Green	Jennifer Alderson	1,141	1.88	-0.54	–
Marxist–Leninist	Enver Villamizar	77	0.13	-0.02	–
Total valid votes/expense limit		60,531	100.00		$233,865.23
Total rejected ballots		241	0.40	–	
Turnout		60,772	66.19	–	
Eligible voters		91,816			
New Democratic gain from Conservative		Swing		+9.55	
Source: Elections Canada
