= Chatham-Kent—Leamington (federal electoral district) =

Federal electoral district in Ontario, Canada

Coordinates: 42.28°N 82.29°W

Ontario electoral district
- Interactive map of riding boundaries from the 2025 federal election

Federal electoral district
- Legislature: House of Commons
MP
Dave Epp
Conservative
- District created: 2013
- First contested: 2015
- Last contested: 2025
- District webpage: profile, map

Demographics
- Population (2016): 109,619
- Electors (2015): 78,803
- Area (km²): 2,183
- Pop. density (per km²): 50.2
- Census division(s): Chatham-Kent, Essex
- Census subdivision(s): Chatham-Kent, Leamington, Moravian, Pelee

Chatham-Kent—Leamington is a federal electoral district in Ontario. It encompasses a portion of Ontario previously included in the electoral districts of Chatham-Kent—Essex and Essex and Lambton—Kent—Middlesex.

Chatham-Kent—Leamington was created by the 2012 federal electoral boundaries redistribution and was legally defined in the 2013 representation order. It came into effect upon the call of the 42nd Canadian federal election, scheduled for 19 October 2015.

== Members of Parliament ==
This riding has elected the following members of Parliament:

Parliament	Years	Member	Party
Chatham-Kent—Leamington; Riding created from Chatham-Kent—Essex, Essex, and Lambton—Kent—Middlesex
42nd	2015–2019	Dave Van Kesteren	Conservative
43rd	2019–2021	Dave Epp	Conservative
44th	2021–2025	Dave Epp	Conservative
45th	2025–present	Dave Epp	Conservative

== Election results ==
View source data.
Graph of election results in Chatham-Kent—Leamington (minor parties that never got 2% of the vote or didn't run consistently are omitted)

2025 Canadian federal election
Party	Candidate	Votes	%	±%	Expenditures
Conservative	Dave Epp	41,612	57.5	+15.08	$122,199.11
Liberal	Keith Pickard	25,978	35.9	+9.17	$111,451.70
New Democratic	Seamus McInnis Fleming	2,943	4.1	–10.54	$0.00
People's	Trevor Lee	1,061	1.5	–13.24	$0.00
Green	James Plunkett	757	1.0	–0.47	$0.00
Total valid votes/expense limit		72,351	99.39	+0.09	$150,568.88
Total rejected ballots		444	0.6	–0.09	
Turnout		72,795	68.45	+4.65	
Eligible voters		106,351			
Conservative notional hold		Swing		+2.96	
Source: CBC, Elections Canada

2021 Canadian federal election
Party	Candidate	Votes	%	±%	Expenditures
Conservative	Dave Epp	22,435	40.9	-6.0	$77,018.86
Liberal	Greg Hetherington	15,683	28.6	-2.6	$82,487.05
New Democratic	Dan Gelinas	8,007	14.6	-0.6	$4,338.12
People's	Liz Vallee	7,892	14.4	+12.4	$17,320.60
Green	Mark Vercouteren	837	1.5	-2.6	$0.75
Total valid votes/expense limit		54,854	99.3	–	$115,717.06
Total rejected ballots		400	0.7		
Turnout		55,254	63.8		
Eligible voters		86,615			
Conservative hold		Swing		-1.7	
Source: Elections Canada

2021 federal election redistributed results
Party	Vote	%
Conservative	27,528	42.43
Liberal	17,345	26.74
People's	9,544	14.71
New Democratic	9,477	14.61
Green	983	1.52

2019 Canadian federal election
Party	Candidate	Votes	%	±%	Expenditures
Conservative	Dave Epp	25,359	46.9	+5.19	$112,325.66
Liberal	Katie Omstead	16,899	31.2	-6.03	none listed
New Democratic	Tony Walsh	8,229	15.2	-3.17	$3,959.54
Green	Mark Vercouteren	2,233	4.1	+1.42	$372.30
People's	John Balagtas	1,061	2.0	-	$1,212.06
Marijuana	Paul Coulbeck	307	0.6	-	$0.00
Total valid votes/expense limit		54,088	100.0		
Total rejected ballots		450			
Turnout		54,538	63.3		
Eligible voters		86,165			
Conservative hold		Swing		+5.61	
Source: Elections Canada

2015 Canadian federal election
Party	Candidate	Votes	%	±%	Expenditures
Conservative	Dave Van Kesteren	21,677	41.71	-11.49	$119,230.26
Liberal	Katie Omstead	19,351	37.23	+20.95	$64,239.01
New Democratic	Tony Walsh	9,549	18.37	-8.79	$12,638.15
Green	Mark Vercouteren	1,394	2.68	-0.66	$1,379.30
Total valid votes/expense limit		51,971	100.00		$213,665.70
Total rejected ballots		263	0.50	–	
Turnout		52,234	65.99	–	
Eligible voters		79,160			
Conservative notional hold		Swing		-16.22	
Source: Elections Canada

2011 federal election redistributed results
Party	Vote	%
Conservative	24,672	53.20
New Democratic	12,595	27.16
Liberal	7,553	16.29
Green	1,551	3.34
Others	4	0.01

== Demographics ==
According to the 2021 Canadian census
Languages: 80.6% English, 3.6% German, 2.2% French, 1.6% Plautdietsch, 1.6% Spanish, 1.1% Portuguese, 1.0% Arabic
Religions: 67.8% Christian (29.4% Catholic, 7.2% United Church, 4.0% Anglican, 3.0% Anabaptist, 2.6% Baptist, 1.8% Pentecostal, 1.8% Presbyterian, 18.0% other), 1.3% Muslim, 29.2% none
Median income: $38,400 (2020)
Average income: $47,480 (2020)

Panethnic groups in Chatham-Kent—Leamington (2011−2021)
Panethnic group	2021		2016		2011	
Panethnic group	Pop.	%	Pop.	%	Pop.	%
European (Note: Statistic includes all persons that did not make up part of a visible minority or an indigenous identity.)	95,120	86.05%	95,740	90.35%	99,730	91.91%
Indigenous	3,760	3.4%	3,265	3.08%	2,595	2.39%
African	3,075	2.78%	2,185	2.06%	1,760	1.62%
Latin American	2,520	2.28%	1,035	0.98%	935	0.86%
Southeast Asian (Note: Statistic includes total responses of "Filipino" and "Southeast Asian" under visible minority section on census.)	1,770	1.6%	1,295	1.22%	760	0.7%
Middle Eastern (Note: Statistic includes total responses of "West Asian" and "Arab" under visible minority section on census.)	1,610	1.46%	955	0.9%	1,155	1.06%
South Asian	1,420	1.28%	650	0.61%	635	0.59%
East Asian (Note: Statistic includes total responses of "Chinese", "Korean", and "Japanese" under visible minority section on census.)	645	0.58%	620	0.59%	710	0.65%
Other/multiracial (Note: Statistic includes total responses of "Visible minority, n.i.e." and "Multiple visible minorities" under visible minority section on census.)	605	0.55%	220	0.21%	225	0.21%
Total responses	110,535	97.26%	105,965	96.67%	108,505	97%
Total population	113,654	100%	109,619	100%	111,866	100%
Notes: Totals greater than 100% due to multiple origin responses. Demographics based on 2012 Canadian federal electoral redistribution riding boundaries.

== See also ==
- List of Canadian electoral districts
- Historical federal electoral districts of Canada
