= Professional agrologist =

Canadian professional designation

Professional agrologist (abbreviated PAg) in Canada, also called agronome (abbreviated agr.) in Québec, is the professional designation for the agrology profession in Canada. There are more than 10,000 professional agrologists and agronomes in Canada, registered in ten (10) provincial institutes of agrologists. In the United States the professional designation is Certified Professional Agronomist (abbreviated C.PAg) .

== Role of the agrologist ==
Agrologists are science based consultants, educated and specializing in areas such as animal science, food science, genetic engineering, soil science and environmental sciences. Professional agrologists may provide advice directly to farmers, vineyards, agricultural corporations.

== Alternate certifications ==
In the United States, the American Society of Agronomy is the regulatory organization responsible for certification. The American Society of Agronomy uses a sliding scale of education and experience to determine certification - it is required to have either a bachelor's degree in science and 5 years work experience, a master's degree related to agrology and 3 years work experience, or a Doctorate related to agrology and a single year of work experience. The American Society of Agronomy also provides certifications for Certified Crop Advisors (CCA).

== See also ==
- Agronomy
- Agricultural Science
- Agricultural engineering
- Horticulture
- Animal Science
- Botany
- American Society of Agronomy
- Forestry
- Aquaculture
- Forestry
