= Centralia =

Centralia may refer to:

== Places ==
=== Australia ===
- Central Australia, sometimes called "Centralia"

=== Canada ===
- Centralia, Ontario
  - RCAF Station Centralia, a former Royal Canadian Air Force training base
  - Centralia (Essery Field) Aerodrome

=== United States ===
- Centralia Township, Marion County, Illinois
  - Centralia, Illinois, a city
    - Centralia station (Illinois), an Amtrak station
    - Centralia Municipal Airport
    - Centralia Correctional Center, a medium-security state prison for men
- Lake Centralia, Marion County, Illinois, a reservoir
- Centralia, Iowa, a city
- Centralia, Kansas, a city
- Centralia Township, Boone County, Missouri
  - Centralia, Missouri, a city
- Centralia, New York, a hamlet
- Centralia, original name of Fargo, North Dakota
- Centralia, Oklahoma, an unincorporated community
- Centralia, Pennsylvania, a borough and near-ghost town
- Centralia, Texas, an unincorporated community
- Centralia, Virginia, an unincorporated community
- Centralia, Washington, a city
  - Centralia Coal Mine, an open-pit coal mine
  - Centralia station (Washington), an Amtrak station
- Centralia Canal, Washington
- Centralia, West Virginia, an unincorporated community
- Centralia, Wisconsin, a city that merged with Grand Rapids to form what is now Wisconsin Rapids

== Schools ==
- Centralia College, Centralia, Washington, United States
- Centralia College of Agricultural Technology, Huron Lake, Ontario, Canada, a former college
- Centralia High School (disambiguation), various schools in the United States

== Other uses ==
- Centralia (album), 2007 debut album by Car Bomb
- "Centralia", a song by God Is an Astronaut on the 2015 album Helios / Erebus

== See also ==
- Centralian Advocate, an Australian newspaper
- Centrale (disambiguation)
