= Canadian House of Commons Standing Committee on Foreign Affairs and International Development =

Standing committee of the House of Commons of Canada

The Standing Committee on Foreign Affairs and International Development (FAAE) is a committee in the House of Commons of Canada that focuses on Canada's foreign policy and international development.

Before the 39th Parliament, the committee was known as the Standing Committee on Foreign Affairs and International Trade.

== Mandate ==
- Canadian foreign and development policy
- International affairs (including developments or crises in specific regions or countries) and international security;
- Membership of international organizations such as the United Nations, the World Bank, the International Monetary Fund, the Organization of American States, Asia-Pacific Economic Co-operation, the G8, the North Atlantic Treaty Organization, the Commonwealth of Nations, the Francophonie, and the Organisation for Economic Co-operation and Development.
- The operation, management and legislation of the Department of Foreign Affairs and International Trade and its agencies:
  - The Canadian International Development Agency
  - The International Development Research Centre
  - The International Joint Commission
  - The Foreign Claims Commission
  - The International Boundary Commission
  - The Roosevelt Campobello International Park Commission
  - The Canada-United States Permanent Joint Board on Defence
  - The Canadian International Grains Institute
  - The International Centre for Human Rights and Democratic Development

== Membership ==
As of the 45th Canadian Parliament:

Party	Member	District
Liberal	Ahmed Hussen, chair	York South—Weston—Etobicoke, ON
Conservative	Michael Chong, vice chair	Wellington—Halton Hills North, ON
Bloc Québécois	Alexis Brunelle-Duceppe, vice chair	Lac-Saint-Jean, QC
Conservative	Ziad Aboultaif	Edmonton Manning, AB
Liberal	Bill Blair	Scarborough Southwest, ON
Liberal	Mona Fortier	Ottawa—Vanier—Gloucester, ON
Conservative	Shelby Kramp-Neuman	Hastings—Lennox and Addington—Tyendinaga, ON
Liberal	Rob Oliphant	Don Valley West, ON
Conservative	Lianne Rood	Middlesex—London, ON
Liberal	Anita Vandenbeld	Ottawa West—Nepean, ON

== Subcommittees ==
- Subcommittee on Agendas and Procedures (SFAA)
- Subcommittee on International Human Rights (SDIR)
