= Bev Shipley =

Canadian politician

Beverly Shipley
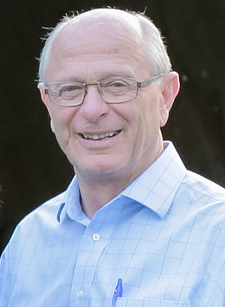
- Shipley in 2017

Member of Parliament for Lambton—Kent—Middlesex
- In office January 23, 2006 – September 11, 2019
- Preceded by: Rose-Marie Ur
- Succeeded by: Lianne Rood

Chair of the Standing Committee on Agriculture
- In office October 24, 2013 – August 2, 2015
- Minister: Gerry Ritz
- Preceded by: Merv Tweed
- Succeeded by: Pat Finnigan

Personal details
- Born: June 22, 1947 (age 78) Middlesex Centre, Ontario, Canada
- Party: Conservative
- Spouse: Barb Shipley

Beverly Shipley (born June 22, 1947) is a retired Canadian politician in Ontario who served as the Member of Parliament for the riding of Lambton—Kent—Middlesex from 2006 to 2019 as a member of the Conservative Party.

Shipley ran in the 2004 election for the Conservatives in Lambton—Kent—Middlesex but lost to incumbent Rose-Marie Ur of the Liberal Party of Canada by only 164 votes. Shipley won the seat in 2006 after Ur did not seek re-election, and was re-elected in 2008, 2011, and 2015. Shipley announced on July 9, 2018, that he would not be running in the 2019 federal election.

== Political life ==
Shipley has championed various agriculture-related causes during his time in Parliament, including his Prime Member's Motion M-460. The motion called on Parliament to streamline the fertilizer regulations and approval processes with the United States. It has influenced sections of Bill C-18: Agricultural Growth Act. Shipley also introduced a second Private Members' Motion M-382 on Religious Freedom. It passed by unanimous consent in the House of Commons and backed the creation of the Office of Religious Freedom.

Shipley was chosen in 2011 by the Prime Minister to chair the South West Ontario Conservative Regional Caucus. He sat as a member on many standing committees, including Public Accounts and International Trade. In October 2013, he was elected as Chair of the Standing Committee on Agriculture and Agri-food. The committee was involved in various studies, including Bill C-30: Fair Rail for Grain Farmers Act and Bill C-18: Agricultural Growth Act. The committee also conducted a study of the Canada-Europe Trade Agreement (CETA).

== Personal life ==
Shipley has lived in Middlesex County his entire life. His interest in agriculture stems from having taken over his family farm. A graduate of the Centralia College of Agricultural Technology, Shipley was elected as a councillor in Lobo Township in 1986 and as the Warden of Middlesex County in 1995. He was also the mayor of Middlesex Centre for six years.

Shipley is married to Barb Shipley (née: Stewart) and has three children, one girl and two boys. His father-in-law is Bill Stewart, former Minister of Agriculture for the province of Ontario (1961–1975).
