= New Democratic Party candidates in the 1997 Canadian federal election =

The New Democratic Party of Canada ran a full slate of candidates in the 1997 federal election, and won 21 seats out of 301 to emerge as the fourth-largest party in the House of Commons of Canada. Many of the party's candidates have their own biography pages; information about others may be found here.

== Alberta ==
=== Calgary ===
Riding	Candidate's Name	Notes	Residence	Occupation	Votes	%	Rank
Calgary Centre	Duncan Green		Calgary	Instructor	3,011	6.05	4th
Calgary East	Kaie Jones		Calgary	Grocer	1,926	6.49	4th
Calgary Northeast	Bruce Potter		Calgary	Teacher	1,209	3.36	5th
Calgary Nose–Hill	Andrea Garnier		Calgary	Archivist	1,883	3.78	4th
Calgary Southeast	Jason Ness		Calgary	Cook	1,176	2.63	4th
Calgary Southwest	Mara Vogel		Calgary	Self-employed	1,322	2.75	4th
Calgary West	Michael Kozakavich		Calgary	Student	2,105	3.78	4th

=== Edmonton ===
Riding	Candidate's Name	Notes	Residence	Occupation	Votes	%	Rank
Edmonton East	Hana Razga		Edmonton	Human resources professional	4,096	11.79	3rd
Edmonton North	Ray Martin	Leader of the Alberta New Democratic Party (1984–1994); Member of the Legislative Assembly of Alberta for Edmonton-Norwood (1982–1993)	Edmonton	Teacher	5,413	14.87	3rd
Edmonton Southeast	Roberta Allen		Edmonton	Social worker	1,882	5.86	4th
Edmonton Southwest	Richard Vanderberg		Edmonton	Professor	2,070	4.68	4th
Edmonton–Strathcona	Jean McBean		Edmonton	Lawyer	7,251	14.53	3rd
Edmonton West	Duane Good Striker		Edmonton	Consultant	3,386	8.26	3rd

=== Rural Alberta ===
Riding	Candidate's Name	Notes	Residence	Occupation	Votes	%	Rank
Athabasca	Bryan Nelson		Athabasca	Pipefitter	1,262	4.69	4th
Crowfoot	Bill Scotten		Camrose	Businessman	1,635	3.79	4th
Elk Island	Mary Ellen VanDusen		Sherwood Park	Accountant	2,544	5.87	4th
Lakeland	John Williams		Edmonton		1,737	4.43	4th
Lethbridge	Victor Lough		Lethbridge	Cook	2,211	5.47	4th
Macleod	Stanley Carl Knowlton		Brocket	Civil servant	1,444	4.05	4th
Medicine Hat	Jim Driscoll		Medicine Hat		1,719	4.94	4th
Peace River	Ray A. Domeij		Grande Prairie	Union official	2,226	5.86	4th
Red Deer	Janet Walter		Red Deer	Farmer	1,660	4.0	4th
St. Albert	Jim Connelly		St. Albert	Courier	2,172	4.94	4th
Wetaskiwin	Cliff Reid		Leduc		1,940	4.8	4th
Wild Rose	Anne Wilson		Canmore	Gardener	1,594	3.6	4th
Yellowhead	Dennis Atkinson		Edmonton		1,759	4.8	4th

== British Columbia ==
=== British Columbia Interior ===
Riding	Candidate's Name	Notes	Residence	Occupation	Votes	%	Rank
Cariboo—Chilcotin	Terry Tate		Williams Lake	Millworker	4,406		3rd
Kamloops, Thompson and Highland Valleys	Nelson Riis	Member of Parliament for Kamloops (1988–2000) and Kamloops—Shuswap (1980–1988); Member of Kamloops City Council (1978–1980)	Kamloops	Professor at Cariboo College	16,138		1st
Kelowna	Fred Steele		Kelowna	Public relations professional	3,838		4th
Kootenay—Columbia	Greg Edwards		Revelstoke	Train eingineer	5,133		3rd
Okanagan—Coquihalla	David Finnis		Summerland		5,441		3rd
Okanagan—Shuswap	Calvin White		Armstrong	Teacher	5,839		3rd
Prince George—Bulkley Valley	Molly Eichar		Prince George	Professor	3,935		3rd
Prince George—Peace River	Alex Michalos		Prince George	Professor	2,989		3rd
Skeena	Isaac Sobol		New Aiyansh	Physician	9,863		2nd
West Kootenay—Okanagan	Kirk Duff		Castlegar		8,869		2nd

=== Fraser Valley/Lower Mainland ===
Riding	Candidate's Name	Notes	Residence	Occupation	Votes	%	Rank
Burnaby—Douglas	Svend Robinson	Member of Parliament for Burnaby—Kingsway (1988–1997), and for Burnaby (1979–1988)	Burnaby	Lawyer	19,058		1st
Delta—South Richmond	Lloyd MacDonald		Delta	Researcher	4,715		3rd
Dewdney—Alouette	Malcolm James Crockett		Maple Ridge	Social worker	8,296		3rd
Fraser Valley	Rob Lees		Chilliwack	Psychologist	4,680		3rd
Langley—Abbotsford	Paul Latham		Abbotsford		3,418		3rd
New Westminster—Coquitlam—Burnaby	Dawn Black	Member of Parliament for New Westminster (1988–1993)	New Westminster	Executive assistant	14,067	26.06	2nd
North Vancouver	Martin Stuible		North Vancouver	Teacher	5,075		3rd
Port Moody—Coquitlam	Joy Langan	Member of Parliament for Mission—Coquitlam (1988–1993)	New Westminster		10,444	19.70	3rd
Richmond	Sylvia Surette		Richmond	Businesswoman	3,964		3rd
South Surrey—White Rock—Langley	Julie A. Grenier		Surrey		3,616		3rd
Surrey Central	Charan Gill		Surrey		7,064		3rd
Surrey North	Judy Villeneuve		Surrey		6,579		3rd
Vancouver Centre	Bill Siksay		Vancouver	Executive assistant	10,690		3rd
Vancouver East	Libby Davies	Member of Vancouver City Council (1982–1993)	Vancouver	Human resources professional	14,961		1st
Vancouver Kingsway	Victor Wong		Burnaby	Project manager	10,662		2nd
Vancouver Quadra	Donovan T. Kuehn		Vancouver	Clerk	4,486		4th
Vancouver South—Burnaby	Herschel Hardin		West Vancouver	Writer	7,467		3rd
West Vancouver—Sunshine Coast	Clark Banks		Powell River	Power engineer	5,988		3rd

=== Vancouver Island ===
Riding	Candidate's Name	Notes	Residence	Occupation	Votes	%	Rank
Esquimalt—Juan de Fuca	Chris Main		Victoria	Businessman	10,400		3rd
Nanaimo—Alberni	Bill Holdom	Member of Nanaimo City Council (1986–1996)	Nanaimo	Professor at Malaspina University-College	11,162		2nd
Nanaimo—Cowichan	Garth Mirau		Nanaimo	Fisherman	13,112		2nd
Saanich—Gulf Islands	Chuck Beyer		Victoria	Real estate agent	8,080		3rd
Vancouver Island North	Gilbert Popovich		Alert Bay	Businessman	11,152		2nd
Victoria	Carol Judd		Victoria	Communications professional	11,419		3rd

== Manitoba ==
Riding	Candidate's Name	Notes	Residence	Occupation	Votes	%	Rank
Brandon—Souris	Jennifer Howard		Brandon	Administrator	4,983	13.4	4th
Charleswood—St. James—Assiniboia	Rupert Forde		Steinbach		3,923	10.6	4th
Churchill	Bev Desjarlais		Thompson	Clerk	9,616	41.2	1st
Dauphin—Swan River	Betty Findlay		Minnedosa		7,575	21.2	3rd
Portage—Lisgar	Glen Hallick	MB NDP candidate for Morris in the 1995 Manitoba provincial election	Starbuck	Civil servant	2,420	7.2	4th
Provencher	Martha Wiebe Owen	MB NDP candidate for Tuxedo in the 1995 Manitoba provincial election NDP candidate for Provencher in the 1993 federal election	Pinawa		3,137	8.6	4th
Selkirk—Interlake	Kathleen McCallum	MB NDP candidate for St. Vital in the 1990 Manitoba provincial election	Selkirk	Researcher	10,749	27.8	3rd
St. Boniface	Peter Carney		Winnipeg	Teacher	6,663	18.0	2nd
Winnipeg Centre	Pat Martin		Winnipeg	Carpenter	10,979	40.9	1st
Winnipeg North Centre	Judy Wasylycia-Leis	Member of the Legislative Assembly of Manitoba for St. Johns (1986–1993)	Winnipeg		13,663	50.3	1st
Winnipeg North—St. Paul	Roman Yereniuk	Winnipeg School Division trustee (1989–1995)	Winnipeg	Professor at St. Andrew's College	9,487	26.3	2nd
Winnipeg South	Iris Taylor		Winnipeg	Marketing professional	4,629	12.2	4th
Winnipeg South Centre	Sara Malabar		Winnipeg	Student	5,717	16.0	2nd
Winnipeg—Transcona	Bill Blaikie	Member of Parliament for Winnipeg—Transcona (1988–2004) and for Winnipeg—Birds Hill (1979–1988)	Winnipeg	United Church minister	16,640	50.3	1st

== New Brunswick ==
Riding	Candidate's Name	Notes	Residence	Occupation	Votes	%	Rank
Acadie—Bathurst	Yvon Godin		Bathurst	Union leader (United Steelworkers)	21,113	40.53	1st
Beauséjour—Petitcodiac	Angela Vautour		Grand-Bouctouche	Civil servant	18,504	38.99	1st
Charlotte	Rob Rainer		Saint Andrews	Project manager	2,397	7.4	4th
Fredericton	Patricia Hughes		Fredericton	Professor	4,689	13.06	4th
Fundy—Royal	Larry Washburn		Wirral	Industrial mechanic	3,790	9.41	4th
Madawaska—Restigouche	André Carrier		Dalhousie	Firefighter	4,211	10.41	3rd
Miramichi	Allan Goodfellow		Derby	Millworker	5,263	15.29	3rd
Moncton	Tom Barron		Stilesville		7,510	16.05	3rd
Saint John	Larry Hanley		Saint John	Consultant	3,679	10.4	3rd

== Newfoundland and Labrador ==
Riding	Candidate's Name	Notes	Residence	Occupation	Votes	%	Rank
Bonavista-Trinity-Conception	Fraser March		Blaketown	Consultant	12,359	33.70	2nd
Burin-St. George's	David A. Sullivan		Torbay	Teacher	4,784		3rd
Gander—Grand Falls	Mary Shortall		St. John's		3,620		3rd
Humber—St. Barbe—Baie Verte	Joan Scott		St. John's	Professor	4,421	14.60	3rd
Labrador	Randy Collins	Former president of United Steelworkers Local 5795	Labrador City	Millwright	4,615	37.79	2nd
St. John's East	Ted Warren		St. John's	Journalist	12,460	28.09	2nd
St. John's West	Lee Ingram		St. John's		6,866		3rd

== Nova Scotia ==
Riding	Candidate's Name	Notes	Residence	Occupation	Votes	%	Rank
Bras d'Or	Michelle Dockrill		Sydney		17,575	41.30	1st
Cumberland—Colchester	Peter Stewart		Truro		6,058	14.20	3rd
Dartmouth	Wendy Lill		Dartmouth	Writer	12,326	32.57	1st
Halifax	Alexa McDonough	Leader of the New Democratic Party (1995–2003); Leader of the Nova Scotia New Democratic Party (1980–1994); Member of the Nova Scotia House of Assembly for Halifax Fairview (1993–1995) and Halifax Chebucto (1981–1993)	Halifax	Social worker	21,837	49.02	1st
Halifax West	Gordon Earle		Upper Tantallon	Civil servant	16,013	34.63	1st
Kings—Hants	Philip A. Brown		Selma		9,101	18.97	3rd
Pictou—Antigonish—Guysborough	Charlene Long		Antigonish	Nurse	8,284	19.28	3rd
Sackville—Eastern Shore	Peter Stoffer		Windsor Junction	Airline employee	12,433	30.37	1st
South Shore	Blandford Nickerson		Port Joli	Fisherman	8,137	20.72	3rd
Sydney—Victoria	Peter Mancini		Sydney	Lawyer	22,455	51.1	1st
West Nova	Brian Noble		Yarmouth	Teacher	7,862	20.46	3rd

== Ontario ==
=== Central Ontario ===
Riding	Candidate's Name	Notes	Residence	Occupation	Votes	%	Rank
Barrie—Simcoe—Bradford	Peggy McComb		Barrie	Union official	2,580	4.8	4th
Dufferin—Peel—Wellington—Grey	Kevin Kelly		Orangeville		2,355	4.8	4th
Durham	Colin Argyle		Bowmanville	Auto worker	3,250	7.1	4th
Northumberland	Murray Weppler		Gores Landing	Consultant	2,678	5.8	4th
Peterborough	Fred Birket		Millbrook		4,874	8.9	4th
Simcoe—Grey	Marty Wilkinson		Creemore	Teacher	3,090	6.1	4th
Simcoe North	Ann Billings		Moonstone		2,488	4.8	4th
York North	Laurie Cooke		Pefferlaw	Administrator	1,996	3.9	4th
Victoria—Haliburton	Rick Denyer		Lindsay		3,456	6.5	4th

=== Eastern Ontario/Ottawa ===
Riding	Candidate's Name	Notes	Residence	Occupation	Votes	%	Rank
Carleton—Gloucester	Cindy Ignacz		Orleans	Sales professional	2,831	5.59	4th
Glengarry—Prescott—Russell	Fred Cappuccino		Kenyon	Christian minister (Unitarian Universalist)	2,289		4th
Hastings—Frontenac—Lennox and Addington	Robert Snefjella		Bancroft		3,255		4th
Kingston and the Islands	Gary Wilson	Member of the Legislative Assembly of Ontario for Kingston and the Islands (1990–1995)	Kingston	Librarian	6,433		4th
Lanark—Carleton	Gail Myles		Kanata	Student	3,022		4th
Leeds—Grenville	Jennifer Breakspear		Kemptville		1,757		4th
Nepean—Carleton	Cathy Martin		Manotick		2,788		4th
Ottawa Centre	Jamey Heath		Ottawa	Writer	13,646		2nd
Ottawa South	Marcella Munro		Ottawa	Communications professional	4,374		4th
Ottawa—Vanier	David Gagnon		Ottawa		5,952		3rd
Ottawa West—Nepean	Wendy Byrne		West Ottawa	Lawyer	4,163		4th
Prince Edward—Hastings	Barb Dolan		Corbyville		2,512		4th
Renfrew—Nipissing—Pembroke	Barbara Clarke		Pembroke	Researcher	3,242		4th
Stormont—Dundas	Sydney Gardiner		Cornwall	Sales professional	2,671		4th

=== Greater Toronto Area ===
Riding	Candidate's Name	Notes	Residence	Occupation	Votes	%	Rank
Beaches—East York	Mel Watkins		Toronto	Political economist / Professor at the University of Toronto	10,730		2nd
Bramalea—Gore—Malton—Springdale	Abdul Majeed		Brampton	Accountant	2,281		4th
Brampton Centre	Paul Ferreira		Brampton	Journalist	2,923		4th
Brampton West—Mississauga	Nirmal Dhinsa		Brampton	Self-employed	2,192		4th
Broadview–Greenwood	Jack Layton	Member of Toronto City Council (1982–1991 & 1994–2003)	Toronto	Professor	13,903	32.77	2nd
Burlington	Jim Hough		Burlington	Technician	2,561		4th
Davenport	Chris Masterson		Toronto	Social worker	4,807		2nd
Don Valley East	Shodja Ziaian		North York	Professor	2,981		4th
Don Valley West	Richard Tiller		Toronto	Researcher	2,922		4th
Eglinton—Lawrence	Sam Savona		Toronto	Disability rights advocate	3,955		3rd
Etobicoke Centre	Matthew Bonk		Etobicoke		2,661		4th
Etobicoke—Lakeshore	Karen Ridley		Etobicoke	Teacher	4,085		4th
Etobicoke North	Carmela Sasso		Toronto	Executive assistant	3,350		4th
Halton	Jay Jackson		Norval		2,452		4th
Markham	Bhanu Gaunt		Markham	Small business owner	1,482		5th
Mississauga Centre	Vishnu Roche		Mississauga		1,900		4th
Mississauga East	Terry Gorman		Mississauga		2,156		4th
Mississauga South	Jessica Lott		Mississauga	Student	2,302		4th
Mississauga West	Timothy Dean Speck		Mississauga	Editor	2,128		4th
Oak Ridges	Wynne Hartviksen		Richmond Hill		2,411		4th
Oakville	Willie Lambert		Oakville	Bus driver	2,343		4th
Oshawa	Brian Nicholson	Member of Oshawa City Council (1985–2010)	Oshawa	Correctional officer	7,350		3rd
Parkdale—High Park	Paul Schmidt		Toronto	Vice-principal	8,762		2nd
Pickering—Ajax—Uxbridge	Douglas W. Grey		Pickering		2,576		4th
Scarborough—Agincourt	Doug Hum		Toronto		2,512		4th
Scarborough Centre	Chris Stewart		Scarborough	Student	3,171	7.94	3rd
Scarborough East	Bob Frankford		Toronto	Physician	3,330		4th
Scarborough—Rouge River	Pedram Moallemian		Scarborough	Self-employed	1,874		4th
Scarborough Southwest	Dave Gracey	NDP candidate for Scarborough West in the 1988 and 1984 federal elections ONDP candidate for Scarborough Centre in the 1977 and 1975 Ontario provincial elections	Scarborough	Principal	4,345		4th
St. Paul's	Michael Halewood		Toronto	Lawyer	6,028		3rd
Thornhill	Helen Breslauer		Toronto		2,008		4th
Toronto Centre—Rosedale	David MacDonald		Toronto		9,597		2nd
Trinity—Spadina	Olivia Chow	Member of Toronto City Council for Ward 24 (Downtown) (1992–2000)	Toronto		16,413		2nd
Vaughan—King—Aurora	Robert Navarretta		Woodbridge		2,250		4th
Whitby—Ajax	Karen Dolan		Whitby		3,354		4th
Willowdale	Mikael Swayze		Toronto	Instructor	2,833		4th
York Centre	Mark Berardo		Downsview		3,618		2nd
York South—Weston	Odoardo Di Santo	Member of the Legislative Assembly of Ontario for Downsview (1975–1985)	Toronto	Administrator	3,552		3rd
York West	Lombe Chinkangala		North York	Paralegal	2,853		2nd

=== Hamilton/Niagara ===
Riding	Candidate's Name	Notes	Residence	Occupation	Votes	%	Rank
Erie—Lincoln	William Hanrath		Dunnville		2,509		4th
Hamilton East	Wayne Marston	NDP candidate for Hamilton East in the 1993 federal election	Hamilton		6,870		2nd
Hamilton Mountain	Chris Charlton		Hamilton		7,440		4th
Hamilton West	Andrea Horwath		Hamilton		7,648		2nd
Niagara Centre	James Wilson		St. Catharines	Teacher	5,510		4th
Niagara Falls	John Cowan		Niagara Falls	Painter	4,052		4th
St. Catharines	Ed Gould	President of Canadian Auto Workers Local 199	St. Catharines	Millwright	4,657		4th
Stoney Creek	Peter Cassidy		Hamilton	Lawyer	3,392		4th
Wentworth—Burlington	Jessica Brennan		Dundas	Manager	3,694	7.86	4th

=== Northern Ontario ===
Riding	Candidate's Name	Notes	Residence	Occupation	Votes	%	Rank
Algoma—Manitoulin	Jody Wildman	Son of Bud Wildman	Richards Landing	Self-employed	7,897		3rd
Kenora—Rainy River	Ruth Bergman		Kenora		6,922		3rd
Nickel Belt	Elie Martel	Member of the Legislative Assembly of Ontario for Sudbury East (1967–1987)	Capreol, Sudbury	Teacher	13,355	33.48	2nd
Nipissing	Art Campbell		Astorville	Sales professional	2,280		4th
Parry Sound—Muskoka	Carl Wirth		Bracebridge	Telecommunications worker	1,700		4th
Sault Ste. Marie	Phyllis Dietrich		Sault Ste. Marie	United Church minister	10,283		2nd
Sudbury	John Filo		Sudbury	Professor at Cambrian College	8,471		2nd
Thunder Bay—Atikokan	Jack Drewes		Thunder Bay	Union official	8,117		2nd
Thunder Bay—Nipigon	Chris Mather		Thunder Bay	Social worker	6,705		2nd
Timiskaming—Cochrane	Marie-Jeanne Lacroix		Iroquois Falls	Custodian	4,623		3rd
Timmins—James Bay	Cid Samson	Member of Parliament for Timmins—Chapleau (1988–1993)	South Porcupine, Timmins		11,945		2nd

=== Southwestern Ontario ===
Riding	Candidate's Name	Notes	Residence	Occupation	Votes	%	Rank
Brant	Pat Franklin		Brantford	Psychotherapist	5,201		4th
Bruce—Grey	Colleen Anne Purdon		Owen Sound		3,446		4th
Cambridge	Mike Farnan	Member of the Legislative Assembly of Ontario for Cambridge (1987–1995)	Cambridge	Teacher	9,813		3rd
Elgin—Middlesex—London	Cynthia Nurse	Elgin County School Board trustee	St. Thomas		3,260		4th
Essex	Gerry Bastien		LaSalle	Union official (Canadian Auto Workers)	14,180		2nd
Guelph—Wellington	Elaine Rogala		Belwood	Mediator	5,456		4th
Haldimand—Norfolk—Brant	Herman Plas		Waterford	Steelworker	2,516		4th
Huron—Bruce	Jan Johnstone		Ripley	Healthcare worker	3,037		4th
Kent—Essex	Derry McKeever		Chatham	Auto worker	4,323		4th
Kitchener Centre	Lucy Harrison		Kitchener	Administrator	4,503		4th
Kitchener–Waterloo	Ted Martin		Kitchener		4,725		4th
Lambton—Kent—Middlesex	Bela Trebics		Wallaceburg	Labourer	2,440		4th
London—Fanshawe	Irene Mathyssen	Member of the Legislative Assembly of Ontario for Middlesex (1990–1995)	Ilderton	Teacher	6,754		3rd
London North Centre	Colleen Redmond		London	Union official	5,679		4th
London West	Sandra McNee		London		5,291		4th
Oxford	Martin Donlevy		Woodstock		3,406		4th
Perth—Middlesex	Linda Ham		Embro	Social worker	3,806		4th
Sarnia—Lambton	Phil Gamester		Sarnia	Consultant	3,320		4th
Waterloo—Wellington	Mike Cooper	Member of the Legislative Assembly of Ontario for Kitchener—Wilmot (1990–1995)	Kitchener	Rubber worker	3,180	4.11	4th
Windsor—St. Clair	Joe Comartin		Windsor	Lawyer	14,237		2nd
Windsor West	Tom Milne		Windsor	Auto worker	9,411		2nd

== Prince Edward Island ==
Riding	Candidate's Name	Notes	Residence	Occupation	Votes	%	Rank
Cardigan	Larry Duchesne	Leader of the New Democratic Party of Prince Edward Island (1991–1995)	Charlottetown	Teacher	1,761	10.50	3rd
Egmont	Adelard Pitre		Richmond	Instructor	1,300	7.41	3rd
Hillsborough	Dody Crane	Leader of the New Democratic Party of Prince Edward Island (1989–1991)	Charlottetown	Lawyer	5,751	30.80	2nd
Malpeque	Andrew Wells		Hunter River		1,863	10.62	3rd

== Quebec ==
=== Central Quebec ===
Riding	Candidate's Name	Notes	Residence	Occupation	Votes	%	Rank
Berthier—Montcalm	Jean-Pierre De Billy		Saint-Calixte	Correctional officer	1,009	1.6	4th
Champlain	Petra Genest		Montreal	Student	632	1.3	4th
Joliette	Jacques Trudeau		Joliette		502	1.0	5th
Lotbinière	Dominique Vaillancourt		Montreal	Administrator	405	1.3	5th
Portneuf	Majella Desmeules		Quebec City	Researcher	1,112	2.6	4th
Repentigny	Normand Caplette		Repentigny	Cashier	916	1.5	4th
Richelieu	Sylvain Pelletier		Sorel	Consultant	1,028	2.1	4th
Saint-Maurice	Eric Hébert		Montreal		489	1.0	4th
Trois-Rivières	Dorothy Hénaut		Montreal	Filmmaker	528	1.1	4th

=== Eastern Townships/Southern Quebec ===
Riding	Candidate's Name	Notes	Residence	Occupation	Votes	%	Rank
Beauce	Joël Pinon		Saint-Georges	Self-employed	735	1.6	5th
Beauharnois—Salaberry	Erin Runions		Montreal	Student	652	1.3	4th
Brome—Missisquoi	Nicole Guillemet		Magog	Social worker	781	1.7	4th
Châteauguay	Hannah Rogers		Montreal	Student	794	1.4	4th
Compton—Stanstead	Christine Moore		Montreal		587	1.4	4th
Drummond	Alexandra Philoctéte		Montreal	Radio broadcaster	441	1.0	4th
Frontenac—Mégantic	Sara Mayo		Montreal		252	0.6	5th
Richmond—Arthabaska	Martin Bergeron		Sherbrooke	Student	641	1.2	4th
Saint-Hyacinthe—Bagot	Jacques Bousquet		Saint-Louis	Real estate agent	809	1.4	4th
Saint-Jean	Julien Patenaude		Saint-Jean-sur-Richelieu	Political scientist	755	1.5	4th
Shefford	Karen Hurley		Montreal	Student	531	1.1	4th
Sherbrooke	Tom Vouloumanos		Sherbrooke	Student	628	1.2	4th

=== Greater Montreal ===
Riding	Candidate's Name	Notes	Residence	Occupation	Votes	%	Rank
Ahuntsic	Steve Moran		Montreal	Administrator	1,051	1.8	4th
Anjou—Rivière-des-Prairies	Elizabeth Lemay Amabili		Montreal	Therapist	752	1.5	4th
Bourassa	Dominique Baillard		Westmount	Economist	999	2.2	4th
Brossard—La Prairie	Samantha McGavin		Montreal	Student	906	1.7	4th
Chambly	Darren O'Toole		Montreal	Student	998	1.9	4th
Hochelaga—Maisonneuve	Milan Mirich	NDPQ candidate for Laurier-Dorion in the 1994 Quebec provincial election and for Maisonneuve in the 1985 provincial election	Montreal	Restaurant owner	825	1.7	4th
Lac-Saint-Louis	Chris Florence		Kirkland	Student	1,548	2.50	5th
LaSalle—Émard	Joe Bowman		Montreal	Editor	920	1.7	4th
Laurier—Sainte-Marie	François Degardin		Montreal	Self-employed	2,180	4.5	4th
Laval Centre	Jean-Yves Dion		Laval	Clerk	1,188	2.1	4th
Laval East	Peter Graefe		Montreal	Student	765	1.3	4th
Laval West	Karina Zeidler		Montreal	Writer	1,072	1.7	4th
Longueuil	Maurice Auzat		Montreal	Student	857	2.1	4th
Mercier	Cathy Milner		Montreal		772	1.6	4th
Mount Royal	Adam Giambrone		Montreal	Student at McGill University	966	2.0	5th
Notre-Dame-de-Grâce—Lachine	André Cardinal		Montreal	Researcher	2,315	4.4	4th
Outremont	Tooker Gomberg		Montreal		2,862	6.4	4th
Papineau—Saint-Denis	Gaby Kombé		Montreal	Social worker	1,196	2.5	4th
Pierrefonds—Dollard	David Lyons		Cottam	Student	1,060	1.8	5th
Rosemont	Fidel Fuentes		Montreal	Student	1,637	3.3	4th
Saint-Bruno—Saint-Hubert	Marie Henretta		Mont-Saint-Hilaire	Professor	1,032	2.0	4th
Saint-Eustache—Sainte-Thérèse	Valérie Kinslow		Saint-Eustache	Musician	947	1.7	4th
Saint-Lambert	Allison Engel		Montreal	Student	921	2.0	4th
Saint-Laurent—Cartierville	Jeff Itcush		Montreal	Teacher	910	1.8	4th
Saint-Léonard—Saint-Michel	Pierre J.C. Allard		Montreal	Lawyer	1,198	2.3	4th
Terrebonne—Blainville	Colette Bouchard		Montreal		1,090	2.0	4th
Vaudreuil—Soulanges	Jason Sigurdson		Montreal	Student	538	1.0	5th
Verchères	Yas Etessam		Montreal	Student	750	1.3	4th
Verdun—Saint-Henri	Claude Ledoux		Montreal	Postal worker	1,156	2.5	4th
Westmount—Ville-Marie	Chris Carter		Montreal	Student	2,566	5.7	4th

=== Northern Quebec ===
Riding	Candidate's Name	Notes	Residence	Occupation	Votes	%	Rank
Abitibi	Claudette Paquin		Montreal		909	2.4	4th
Chicoutimi—Le Fjord	Anne-Marie Buck		Montreal	Student	853	2.0	4th
Jonquière	Carmel Bélanger		Hull	Administrator	353	1.0	4th
Lac-Saint-Jean	Jean-François Morval		Montreal	Student	391	1.2	4th
Manicouagan	Pierre Ducasse		Sept-Îles	Student	1,041	4.0	4th
Roberval	Alain Giguère	NDP candidate for Roberval in the 1993 federal election and for Verdun—Saint-Paul in the 1984 federal election NDPQ candidate for Saint-Henri in the 1985 Quebec provincial election	Montreal	Lawyer	412	1.3	4th
Témiscamingue	Anik-Maude Morin		Montreal		654	1.6	4th

=== Quebec City/Gaspe/Eastern Quebec ===
Riding	Candidate's Name	Notes	Residence	Occupation	Votes	%	Rank
Beauport—Montmorency—Orléans	Jessica Greenberg		Montreal	Student	885	1.7	5th
Bellechasse—Etchemins—Montmagny—L'Islet	Branda Michaud		Montreal	Manager	520	1.2	5th
Bonaventure—Gaspé—Îles-de-la-Madeleine—Pabok	Dennis Drainville	Member of Percé Town Council (1994–2002); Member of the Legislative Assembly of Ontario for Victoria—Haliburton (1990–1993)	Barachois-de-Malbaie	Professor at Cégep de la Gaspésie et des Îles / Anglican priest	649	1.7	4th
Charlesbourg	Jocelyn Tremblay		Quebec City		963	1.7	5th
Charlevoix	François Dumoutier		Montreal	Cook	454	1.2	4th
Kamouraska—Rivière-du-Loup—Témiscouata—Les Basques	Elaine Côté		Hull	Receptionist	420	1.0	5th
Lévis	France Michaud		Montreal	Real estate agent	1,881	3.1	4th
Louis-Hébert	Karl Adomeit		Sillery, Quebec City	Student	1,161	2.0	4th
Matapédia—Matane	Anny-Jos Paquin		Montreal		417	1.2	4th
Quebec	Jean-Marie Fiset	NDP candidate for Portneuf in the 1988 federal election NDPQ candidate for Montmorency in the 1994 Quebec provincial election and for Portneuf in the 1993 Portneuf provincial by-election	Shannon	Hospital employee	2,556	4.6	4th
Quebec East	Cécile Rainville		Ottawa	Economist	1,240	2.1	5th
Rimouski—Mitis	Elizabeth Clark		Montreal	Researcher	479	1.3	4th

=== Western Quebec/Laurentides/Outaouais ===
Riding	Candidate's Name	Notes	Residence	Occupation	Votes	%	Rank
Argenteuil—Papineau	Didier Charles		Ripon	Student	836	1.6	4th
Gatineau	Michelle Bonner		Montreal	Student	982	1.8	4th
Hull—Aylmer	Peter Piening		Hull		1,317	2.8	4th
Laurentides	David Rovins		Sainte-Adèle	Student	844	1.3	4th
Pontiac—Gatineau—Labelle	Brenda Lee		Montreal	Researcher	1,097	2.2	4th

== Saskatchewan ==
Riding	Candidate's Name	Notes	Residence	Occupation	Votes	%	Rank
Battlefords—Lloydminster	Len Taylor		North Battleford	Journalist	8,535	27.8	2nd
Blackstrap	Steven Bobiash		Saskatoon	Executive assistant	10,117	27.6	3rd
Churchill River	Rick Laliberte		Beauval		7,288	34.5	1st
Cypress Hills—Grasslands	Dean Smith		Swift Current	Farmer	6,490	19.4	3rd
Palliser	Dick Proctor		Regina	Consultant	12,553	38.2	1st
Prince Albert	Ray Funk	Member of Parliament for Prince Albert—Churchill River (1988–1993)	Spruce Home		10,418	31.7	2nd
Qu'Appelle	Lorne Nystrom	Member of Parliament for Yorkton—Melville (1968–1993)	Regina	Consultant	12,269	42.4	1st
Regina—Lumsden—Lake Centre	John Solomon	Member of Parliament for Regina—Lumsden (1993–1997); Member of the Legislative Assembly of Saskatchewan for Regina North West (1986–1993 & 1979–1982)	Regina	Small business owner	12,677	42.3	1st
Saskatoon—Humboldt	Dennis Gruending		Saskatoon	Journalist	10,998	32.4	2nd
Saskatoon—Rosetown—Biggar	Chris Axworthy	Member of Parliament for Saskatoon—Clark's Crossing (1988–1997)	Saskatoon	Professor at the University of Saskatchewan	12,095	43.7	1st
Souris—Moose Mountain	Gary Lake		Stoughton	Farmer	6,209	18.6	3rd
Wanuskewin	Walter Kyliuk		Radisson	Principal	8,793	26.8	2nd
Wascana	John Burton		Regina	Agronomist	9,530	28.4	2nd
Yorkton—Melville	Evan Carlson		Melville	Farmer	8,583	25.00	2nd

== The Territories ==
Riding	Candidate's Name	Notes	Residence	Occupation	Votes	%	Rank
Nunavut	Hunter Tootoo	Member of Rankin Inlet Town Council	Rankin Inlet	Civil servant	1,710	23.76	3rd
Western Arctic	Mary Beth Levan		Yellowknife	Small business owner	2,579	19.29	2nd
Yukon	Louise Hardy		Whitehorse	Social worker	4,002	28.93	1st
