= Centralia micropolitan area =

The Centralia micropolitan area may refer to:

- The Centralia, Illinois micropolitan area, United States
- The Centralia, Washington micropolitan area, United States

== See also ==
- Centralia (disambiguation)
