= Elginfield Observatory =

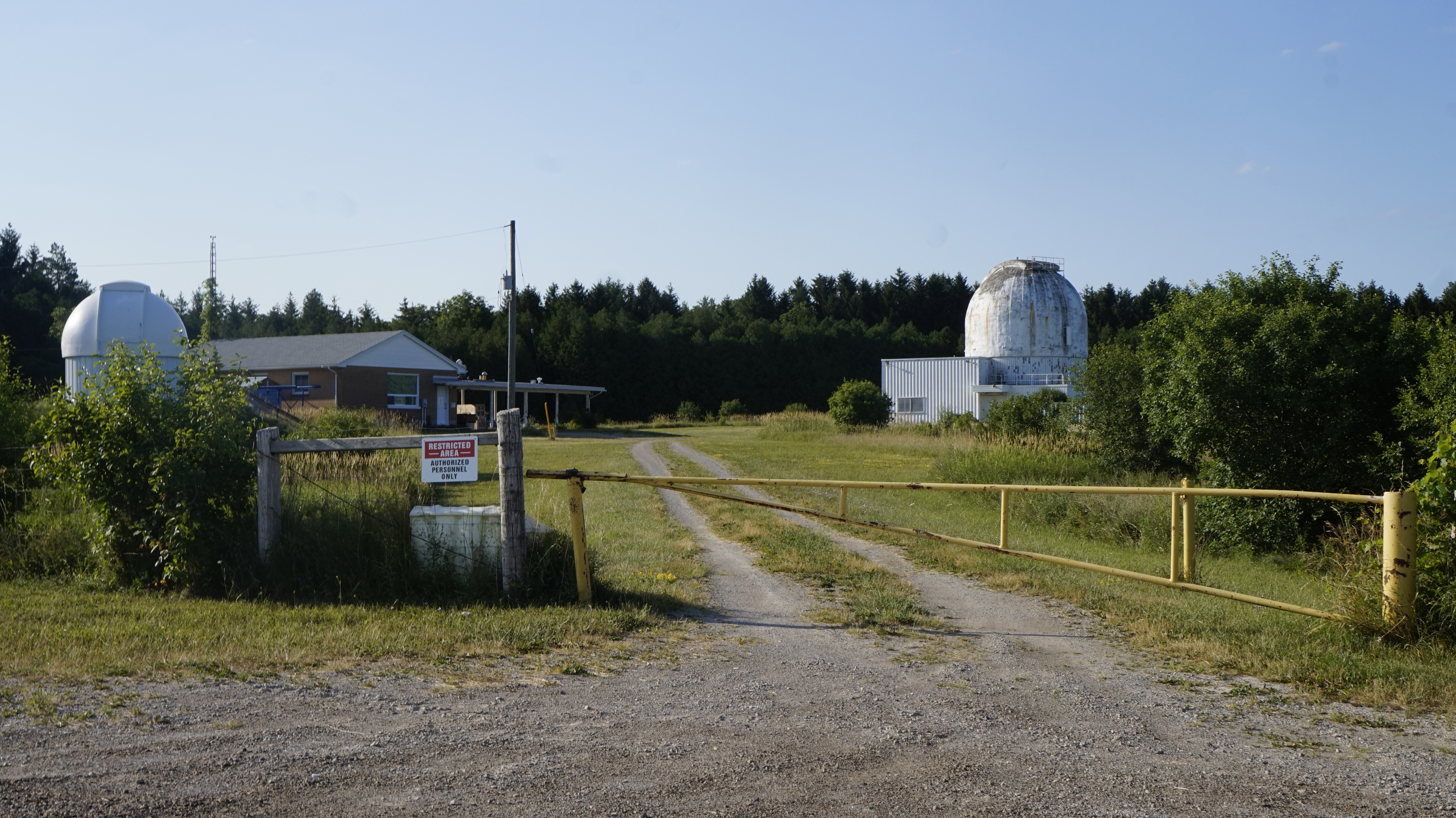
- Elginfield Observatory - Elginfield, ON
- Organization: University of Western Ontario
- Observatory code: 440
- Location: Middlesex Centre, Ontario, Canada
- Coordinates: 43°11′33″N 81°18′57″W
- Altitude: 325 m (1,066 ft)
- Established: 1969
- Website: physics.uwo.ca/~dfgray/elginfield.html

The Elginfield Observatory was an astronomical observatory located in the township of Middlesex Centre, Ontario, Canada, about 25 kilometres (16 mi) north of London, Ontario. The observatory was owned and operated by the University of Western Ontario, and opened in 1969. The observatory featured a 1.2 m (47 in) Ritchey–Chrétien telescope built by Boller and Chivens which is used for spectroscopy and photometry. The telescope could be configured to feed instruments at the Cassegrain, Nasmyth, and Coudé foci. Research done there included monitoring the changing size of Cepheid variable stars, estimating out-gasing of minor planets, and searching for large Perseid meteoroids.

The observatory was closed at the end of 2010.

== See also ==
- David Dunlap Observatory
- List of astronomical observatories
