= Lambton—Kent—Middlesex (federal electoral district) =

Federal electoral district in Ontario, Canada

Coordinates: 42.9°N 81.9°W

Ontario electoral district
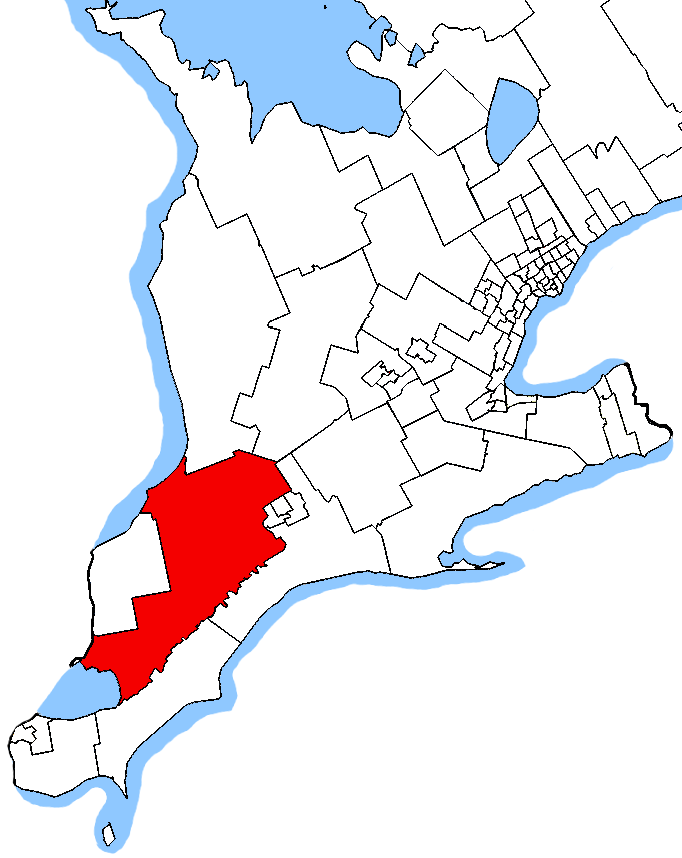
- Lambton—Kent—Middlesex in relation to other southern Ontario electoral districts

Defunct federal electoral district
- Legislature: House of Commons
- District created: 1996
- District abolished: 2023
- First contested: 1997
- Last contested: 2021
- District webpage: profile, map

Demographics
- Population (2016): 105,331
- Electors (2015): 80,027
- Area (km²): 5,278
- Census division(s): Chatham-Kent, Lambton, Middlesex
- Census subdivision(s): Chatham-Kent, Strathroy-Caradoc, Middlesex Centre, Lambton Shores, North Middlesex, Southwest Middlesex, Lucan Biddulph, Warwick, Adelaide Metcalfe, Brooke-Alvinston

Lambton—Kent—Middlesex (formerly known as Middlesex—Kent—Lambton) is a former federal electoral district in Ontario, Canada, that was represented in the House of Commons of Canada from 1997 until its dissolution before the 2025 Canadian federal election.

The district includes all of Middlesex County except the City of London and Thames Centre Township, all of the Municipality of Chatham-Kent north of the Thames River, and excluding the former City of Chatham, and the Municipalities of Lambton Shores, Brooke-Alvinston Township, Dawn Euphemia Township, Warwick Township and the Indian reserves of Kettle Point and Walpole Island in the County of Lambton. The population in 2001 was 105,291, and the area is 5,277 km^{2}.

== History ==
It was created in 1996 from Kent and Lambton—Middlesex. It was renamed "Middlesex—Kent—Lambton" briefly in 2003 to 2004. The retirement of longtime MP Rose-Marie Ur in 2006 allowed Bev Shipley, her Conservative opponent in 2004, to seize the riding. The Tories held the riding without serious difficulty, including in 2015 during the Liberal surge that swept through Ontario.

This riding lost a fraction of territory to Chatham-Kent—Leamington and gained a fraction from Chatham-Kent—Essex during the 2012 electoral redistribution.

After the 2022 Canadian federal electoral redistribution, the riding was dissolved. It was divided between the ridings of Sarnia—Lambton—Bkejwanong, Chatham-Kent—Leamington, and Middlesex—London. Its last MP was Lianne Rood, who represented the riding from 2019 to 2025.

== Demographics ==
According to the 2021 Canadian census

Ethnic groups: 91.8% White, 4.9% Indigenous

Languages: 90.5% English, 1.5% Dutch, 1.2% Portuguese, 1.0% French, 1.0% German

Religions: 63.6% Christian (25.1% Catholic, 10.8% United Church, 5.3% Anglican, 3.2% Presbyterian, 2.6% Baptist, 1.4% Reformed, 1.2% Pentecostal, 14.0% Other), 35.0% None

Median income: $42,400 (2020)

Average income: $52,400 (2020)

== Members of Parliament ==
This riding has elected the following members of Parliament:

| Parliament | Years | Member | Party |
|---|---|---|---|
Lambton—Kent—Middlesex; Riding created from Kent and Lambton—Middlesex
| 36th | 1997–2000 | Rose-Marie Ur | Liberal |
| 37th | 2000–2004 | Rose-Marie Ur | Liberal |
Middlesex—Kent—Lambton
| 38th | 2004–2006 | Rose-Marie Ur | Liberal |
Lambton—Kent—Middlesex
| 39th | 2006–2008 | Bev Shipley | Conservative |
| 40th | 2008–2011 | Bev Shipley | Conservative |
| 41st | 2011–2015 | Bev Shipley | Conservative |
| 42nd | 2015–2019 | Bev Shipley | Conservative |
| 43rd | 2019–2021 | Lianne Rood | Conservative |
| 44th | 2021–2025 | Lianne Rood | Conservative |
Riding dissolved into Chatham-Kent—Leamington, Middlesex—London and Sarnia—Lambton

== Election results ==
Graph of election results in Lambton—Kent—Middlesex (minor parties that never got 2% of the vote are omitted)

2021 Canadian federal election
| Party | Candidate | Votes | % | ±% | Expenditures |
|---|---|---|---|---|---|
| Conservative | Lianne Rood | 29,431 | 48.5 | -0.5 | $82,620.80 |
| Liberal | Sudit Ranade | 12,552 | 20.7 | -4.7 | $52,090.97 |
| New Democratic | Jason Henry | 11,107 | 18.3 | +2.3 | $24,765.53 |
| People's | Kevin Mitchell | 6,567 | 10.8 | +7.7 | none listed |
| Green | Jeremy Hull | 1,035 | 1.7 | -4.2 | $0.00 |
| Total valid votes/expense limit | | 60,692 | 99.3 | – | $119,546.07 |
| Total rejected ballots | | 439 | 0.7 | | |
| Turnout | | 61,131 | 67.0 | | |
| Eligible voters | | 91,287 | | | |
| Conservative hold | | Swing | | +2.1 | |
Source: Elections Canada

2019 Canadian federal election
| Party | Candidate | Votes | % | ±% | Expenditures |
|---|---|---|---|---|---|
| Conservative | Lianne Rood | 28,651 | 49.0 | -1.21 | $54,723.60 |
| Liberal | Jesse McCormick | 14,814 | 25.4 | -4.04 | $46,738.25 |
| New Democratic | Dylan Mclay | 9,355 | 16.0 | -1.03 | $12,335.66 |
| Green | Anthony Li | 3,463 | 5.9 | +2.61 | $4,322.75 |
| People's | Bria Atkins | 1,804 | 3.1 | - | none listed |
| Veterans Coalition | Rob Lalande | 325 | 0.6 | - | none listed |
| Total valid votes/expense limit | | 58,412 | 100.0 | | |
| Total rejected ballots | | 434 | | | |
| Turnout | | 58,846 | 66.6 | | |
| Eligible voters | | 88,402 | | | |
| Conservative hold | | Swing | | +1.42 | |
Source: Elections Canada

2015 Canadian federal election
| Party | Candidate | Votes | % | ±% | Expenditures |
|---|---|---|---|---|---|
| Conservative | Bev Shipley | 28,300 | 50.21 | -7.54 | $116,751.48 |
| Liberal | Ken Filson | 16,529 | 29.44 | +15.29 | $43,000.46 |
| New Democratic | Rex Isaac | 9,598 | 17.03 | -6.92 | $18,556.39 |
| Green | Jim Johnston | 1,873 | 3.32 | -0.01 | $8,429.50 |
| Total valid votes/Expense limit | | 56,363 | 100.00 | | $216,100.07 |
| Total rejected ballots | | 224 | 0.40 | – | |
| Turnout | | 56,587 | 70.15 | – | |
| Eligible voters | | 80,666 | | | |
| Conservative hold | | Swing | | -11.41 | |
Source: Elections Canada

2011 federal election redistributed results
| Party | Vote | % |
|---|---|---|
| Conservative | 29,322 | 57.75 |
| New Democratic | 12,163 | 23.95 |
| Liberal | 7,186 | 14.15 |
| Green | 1,693 | 3.33 |
| Christian Heritage | 413 | 0.81 |

2011 Canadian federal election
| Party | Candidate | Votes | % | ±% | Expenditures |
|---|---|---|---|---|---|
| Conservative | Bev Shipley | 29,546 | 57.7 | +6.4 | – |
| New Democratic | Joe Hill | 12,299 | 24.0 | +8.5 | – |
| Liberal | Gayle Stucke | 7,264 | 14.2 | -10.5 | – |
| Green | Jim Johnston | 1,701 | 3.3 | -3.8 | – |
| Christian Heritage | Mike Janssens | 413 | 0.8 | -0.6 | – |
| Total valid votes | | 51,223 | 100.0 | – | |
| Total rejected ballots | | 229 | 0.45 | +0.05 | |
| Turnout | | 51,452 | 65.23 | +4.13 | |
| Eligible voters | | 78,820 | – | – | |

2008 Canadian federal election
| Party | Candidate | Votes | % | ±% | Expenditures |
|---|---|---|---|---|---|
| Conservative | Bev Shipley | 24,516 | 51.28 | +5.0 | $72,430 |
| Liberal | Jeff Wesley | 11,812 | 24.70 | -6.5 | $53,100 |
| New Democratic | Joe Hill | 7,427 | 15.53 | -1.6 | $6,696 |
| Green | Jim Johnston | 3,386 | 7.08 | +3.0 | $2,161 |
| Christian Heritage | Mike Janssens | 663 | 1.38 | -0.1 | $1,599 |
| Total valid votes/Expense limit | | 47,804 | 100.00 | $84,909 | |
| Total rejected ballots | | 193 | 0.40 | | |
| Turnout | | 47,997 | 61.10 | | |

2006 Canadian federal election
| Party | Candidate | Votes | % | ±% |
|---|---|---|---|---|
| Conservative | Bev Shipley | 25,170 | 46.3 | +6.9 |
| Liberal | Jeff Wesley | 16,935 | 31.2 | -8.5 |
| New Democratic | Kevin Blake | 9,286 | 17.1 | +2.0 |
| Green | Jim Johnston | 2,156 | 4.0 | +0.3 |
| Christian Heritage | Mike Janssens | 799 | 1.5 | -0.6 |
| Total valid votes | | 54,346 | 100.0 | |

2004 Canadian federal election
| Party | Candidate | Votes | % | ±% |
|---|---|---|---|---|
| Liberal | Rose-Marie Ur | 19,452 | 39.7 | -9.1 |
| Conservative | Bev Shipley | 19,288 | 39.4 | -5.0 |
| New Democratic | Kevin Blake | 7,376 | 15.1 | +10.7 |
| Green | Allan McKeown | 1,834 | 3.7 | +3.0 |
| Christian Heritage | Allan James | 1,015 | 2.1 | |
| Total valid votes | | 48,965 | 100.0 | |

Note: Conservative vote is compared to the total of the Canadian Alliance vote and Progressive Conservative vote in 2000 election.

2000 Canadian federal election
| Party | Candidate | Votes | % | ±% |
|---|---|---|---|---|
| Liberal | Rose-Marie Ur | 21,124 | 48.8 | +2.6 |
| Alliance | Ron Young | 13,302 | 30.7 | +3.2 |
| Progressive Conservative | John Phair | 5,918 | 13.7 | -2.2 |
| New Democratic | Joyce Jolliffe | 1,871 | 4.3 | -1.0 |
| Independent | Roger James | 365 | 0.8 | |
| Green | Dan Valkos | 341 | 0.8 | +0.2 |
| Canadian Action | Eva Cryderman | 341 | 0.8 | |
| Total valid votes | | 43,262 | 100.0 | |

Note: Canadian Alliance vote is compared to the Reform vote in 1997 election.

1997 Canadian federal election
| Party | Candidate | Votes | % |
|---|---|---|---|
| Liberal | Rose-Marie Ur | 21,155 | 46.2 |
| Reform | Brian Richardson | 12,602 | 27.5 |
| Progressive Conservative | Victor Alderson | 7,256 | 15.9 |
| New Democratic | Bela Trebics | 2,440 | 5.3 |
| Christian Heritage | Ken Willis | 1,785 | 3.9 |
| Independent | Larry Farquharson | 257 | 0.6 |
| Green | David Drabbant | 256 | 0.6 |
| Total valid votes | | 45,751 | 100.0 |

== See also ==
- List of Canadian electoral districts
- Historical federal electoral districts of Canada
