= Rose-Marie Ur =

Canadian politician

Member of Parliament for Lambton—Kent—Middlesex Lambton—Middlesex (1993-1997)
- In office October 25, 1993 – January 23, 2006
- Preceded by: Ralph Ferguson
- Succeeded by: Bev Shipley

Personal details
- Born: Rosie-Marie Margaret Ur; July 28, 1946 (age 78); Glencoe, Ontario
- Political party: Liberal
- Occupation: Farmer, politician

Rose-Marie Margaret Ur (born July 28, 1946) is a Canadian politician. She was a member of the House of Commons of Canada from 1993 until 2005 and, in her final term in office, represented the riding of Middlesex—Kent—Lambton for the Liberal Party.

== Biography ==
Ur was educated at the Strathroy Middlesex General Hospital, receiving certification as a registered nurse assistant in 1964. She practised in this field from 1963 to 1966, then left to work as a farmer until 1990. She also worked as a constituency assistant to provincial Member of Provincial Parliament (MPP) Doug Reycraft from 1986 to 1988, and federal Member of Parliament (MP) Ralph Ferguson from 1988 to 1993. Ur is a member of the Ontario Federation of Agriculture.

She was first elected to parliament in the 1993 federal election, defeating her nearest opponent by almost 11,000 votes in the old riding of Lambton—Middlesex. She was re-elected by similarly large pluralities in Lambton—Kent—Middlesex in the elections of 1997 and 2000.

Ur faced a difficult re-election in the federal election of 2004, defeating Bev Shipley of the newly formed Conservative Party of Canada by only 164 votes. Shipley could have requested a recount, but declined.

Ur was one of the most socially conservative members of the Liberal caucus, strongly opposed to abortion and same-sex marriage. She was also an opponent of the federal gun registry, and sought to eliminate the program in late 2004. Ur was never appointed as a parliamentary secretary.

In the spring of 2005, Ur announced that she would not seek re-election in the 2006 federal election.
