= Sidney Fraleigh =

Canadian politician (1931–2023)

Sidney Arthur Fraleigh (5 February 1931 – 8 May 2023) was a Canadian politician who was a Progressive Conservative member of the House of Commons.

Born in Forest, Ontario, Fraleigh was a farmer by career. He was the son of Sidney Anderson Fraleigh and was educated at the University of Guelph. In 1953, Fraleigh married Velma Eloise Minielly. He served as a member of the council for Bosanquet Township and was also chairman of the board for the Ontario Pork Producers Marketing Board.

Fraleigh won the seat for the Lambton—Middlesex electoral district in the 1979 federal election but lost there in the 1980 federal election to Ralph Ferguson of the Liberal Party. He regained the seat in 1984, but lost again to Ferguson in the 1988 federal election. Fraleigh thus served in the 31st and 33rd Canadian Parliaments.

Fraleigh died on 8 May 2023, at the age of 92.

== Sources ==
- Canadian Parliamentary Guide, 1987, PG Normandin
