= Ralph Ferguson =

Canadian farmer and former politician (1929–2020)

The Honourable Ralph Ferguson PC

Minister of Agriculture
- In office June 30, 1984 – September 16, 1984
- Prime Minister: John Turner
- Preceded by: Eugene Whelan
- Succeeded by: John Wise

Member of Parliament for Lambton—Middlesex
- In office November 21, 1988 – October 24, 1993
- Preceded by: Sidney Fraleigh
- Succeeded by: Rose-Marie Ur
- In office February 18, 1980 – September 3, 1984
- Preceded by: Sidney Fraleigh
- Succeeded by: Sidney Fraleigh

Personal details
- Born: Ralph Hugh Duncan Ferguson; September 13, 1929 Mosa Township, Ontario, Canada
- Died: August 30, 2020 (aged 90) Watford, Ontario, Ontario, Canada
- Party: Liberal
- Spouse: Dolores Garrod
- Children: 2
- Profession: Farmer

Ralph Ferguson PC (September 13, 1929 – August 30, 2020) was a Canadian farmer and politician.

Ferguson was a farmer in south-western Ontario and co-founder of the Lambton Pork Producers Association. In the late 1950s, he was chairman of the Lambton County Egg Producers.

He was first elected to the House of Commons of Canada in the 1980 federal election as the Liberal Member of Parliament (MP) for Lambton--Middlesex.

Ferguson served as parliamentary secretary to the Minister of State for Small Businesses and Tourism from 1980 to 1982, Deputy Government Whip from 1982 to 1984, and parliamentary secretary to the Minister of Finance from March to June 1984.

When John Turner succeeded Pierre Trudeau as Liberal leader and Prime Minister of Canada, he brought Ferguson into the Cabinet as Minister of Agriculture, succeeding long-time Trudeau Agriculture minister Eugene Whelan.

Ferguson's cabinet career was short-lived, however, as both he and the Turner government were defeated in the September 1984 federal election.

As a backbench MP, Ferguson participated in several trade missions as an advocate of export market expansion. He also played a role in the creation of the Canadian Agricultural Export Corporation or CANAGREX, a crown corporation formed in 1983 and disbanded by the Mulroney government in 1987. As minister, he established the first controlled environment seed bank in an effort to protect parent seed stocks.

He was successful in his attempt to return to the House in the 1988 federal election having campaigned strongly against the Canada-US Free Trade Agreement. Ferguson did not run in the 1993 federal election, preferring to retire from politics and return to the farm where he was an active conservationist. He was also an environmentalist and advocate for renewable energy.

Ferguson died on August 30, 2020, at age 90.
