= Lambton—Middlesex =

Former federal electoral district in Ontario, Canada

Ontario electoral district

Defunct federal electoral district
- Legislature: House of Commons
- District created: 1976
- District abolished: 1996
- First contested: 1979
- Last contested: 1993

Lambton—Middlesex was a federal electoral district represented in the House of Commons of Canada from 1979 to 1997. It was located in the province of Ontario. This riding was created in 1976 from parts of Huron—Middlesex, Lambton—Kent, Middlesex—London—Lambton and Sarnia—Lambton ridings.

It was initially defined as consisting of:

(a) the County of Lambton, excluding the Townships of Moore and Sarnia and any part of the county west of them, and the Township of Moore, and any part of the county north of it, Indian Reserve No. 46, and (b) the part of the County of Middlesex west of the Townships of Biddulph, London and Westminster.

In 1987, it was redefined to consist of:

(a) the County of Lambton excluding the City of Sarnia, the Village of Point Edward, the townships of Moore and Sarnia, Sarnia Indian Reserve No. 45 and Walpole Island Indian Reserve No. 46; and (b) that part of the County of Middlesex west of and including the Townships of McGillivray, Lobo and Delaware.

The electoral district was abolished in 1996 when it was redistributed between Elgin—Middlesex—London, Lambton—Kent—Middlesex, London West, Perth—Middlesex, and Sarnia—Lambton ridings.

== Members of Parliament ==
This riding has elected the following members of Parliament:

Parliament	Years	Member	Party
Riding created from Huron—Middlesex, Lambton—Kent, Middlesex—London—Lambton and Sarnia—Lambton
31st	1979–1980	Sidney Fraleigh	Progressive Conservative
32nd	1980–1984	Ralph Ferguson	Liberal
33rd	1984–1988	Sidney Fraleigh	Progressive Conservative
34th	1988–1993	Ralph Ferguson	Liberal
35th	1993–1997	Rose-Marie Ur	Liberal
Riding dissolved into Lambton—Kent—Middlesex, Elgin—Middlesex—London, London West, Perth—Middlesex and Sarnia—Lambton

== Electoral history ==
1979 Canadian federal election
Party	Candidate	Votes
Progressive Conservative	Sidney Fraleigh	18,770
Liberal	J. Larry Condon	15,335
New Democratic	Grant Reynolds	4,585

1980 Canadian federal election
Party	Candidate	Votes
Liberal	Ralph Ferguson	17,081
Progressive Conservative	Sidney Fraleigh	16,274
New Democratic	Grant Reynolds	4,617

1984 Canadian federal election
Party	Candidate	Votes
Progressive Conservative	Sidney Fraleigh	22,501
Liberal	Ralph Ferguson	13,888
New Democratic	Allen Wilford	4,826

1988 Canadian federal election
Party	Candidate	Votes
Liberal	Ralph Ferguson	17,312
Progressive Conservative	Sidney Fraleigh	16,857
New Democratic	Larry Ross Green	5,063
Christian Heritage	John Koster	2,467

1993 Canadian federal election
Party	Candidate	Votes
Liberal	Rose-Marie Ur	20,292
Progressive Conservative	David Crone	9,369
Reform	Randy Dayman	8,049
Christian Heritage	Ken Willis	1,599
New Democratic	Jamie Hamilton	1,491
National	Larry Farquharson	447
Independent	Alex E. Gubbels	247
Natural Law	Travis Callender	165

== See also ==
- List of Canadian electoral districts
- Historical federal electoral districts of Canada
