= Centralia College of Agricultural Technology =

Former agricultural school in Huron Park, Ontario

- Type: Public Agricultural College
- Active: 1967–1993
- Affiliations: Ministry of Agriculture and Food
- Location: Exeter, Ontario, Canada
- Campus: rural

Centralia College of Agricultural Technology was an agricultural college in Huron Park, Ontario near the town of Exeter. It opened in 1967 and operated under the direction of the Ontario Ministry of Agriculture and Food. The college used local farms, rather than a demonstration farm for field laboratories, in order to gain the cooperation of local farmers. The college was closed due to provincial government cutbacks in the 1993 budget. It closed in the spring of 1994.

The college originally provided diplomas in Agricultural Business Management, Animal Health Technology, Food Service Management, and Home Economics. At the time of its closing, Centralia had the only veterinary technician course which was accredited by the Canadian Veterinary Medical Association. The Ontario Agricultural College picked up this designation after the closing of Centralia.

== Notable alumni ==
- Paul Klopp, mayor of Bluewater and former Ontario MPP
- Maria Van Bommel, former Ontario MPP
- Bev Shipley, former Member of Parliament for Lambton—Kent—Middlesex
