= Middlesex—London =

Federal electoral district in Ontario, Canada

Ontario electoral district
- Interactive map of riding boundaries from the 2025 federal election

Federal electoral district
- Legislature: House of Commons
MP
Lianne Rood
Conservative
- District created: 2023
- First contested: 2025
- Last contested: 2025

Demographics
- Population (2021): 115,610
- Census division: Middlesex
- Census subdivision(s): London (part), Strathroy-Caradoc, Middlesex Centre, Thames Centre, North Middlesex, Southwest Middlesex, Lucan Biddulph, Adelaide Metcalfe, Oneida, Chippewas of the Thames

Middlesex—London is a federal electoral district in Ontario, Canada. It came into effect upon the call of the 2025 Canadian federal election.

== Geography ==
Under the 2022 Canadian federal electoral redistribution the riding will partially replace Lambton—Kent—Middlesex.

- Gains Thames Centre from Elgin—Middlesex—London
- Gains all of the City of London north of Fanshawe Park Road from London West, London North Centre and London—Fanshawe
- Loses all of its territory in Lambton County to Sarnia—Lambton—Bkejwanong
- Loses all of its territory in Chatham-Kent to Chatham-Kent—Leamington

== Demographics ==
According to the 2021 Canadian census

Languages: 82.4% English, 1.8% Mandarin, 1.5% Portuguese, 1.4% Arabic, 1.2% Dutch, 1.2% Spanish, 1.1% French, 1.1% Korean

Religions: 58.2% Christian (22.8% Catholic, 9.2% United Church, 5.0% Anglican, 2.8% Presbyterian, 2.0% Baptist, 1.5% Christian Orthodox, 1.1% Pentecostal, 1.1% Reformed, 12.9% Other), 34.6% No religion, 3.8% Muslim, 1.3% Hindu

Median income: $46,000 (2020)

Average income: $58,050 (2020)

Panethnic groups in Middlesex—London (2021)
Panethnic group	2021	
Panethnic group	Pop.	%
European (Note: Statistic includes all persons that did not make up part of a visible minority or an indigenous identity.)	92,910	81.61%
East Asian (Note: Statistic includes total responses of "Chinese", "Korean", and "Japanese" under visible minority section on census.)	5,090	4.47%
South Asian	4,780	4.2%
Middle Eastern (Note: Statistic includes total responses of "West Asian" and "Arab" under visible minority section on census.)	3,435	3.02%
Indigenous	2,050	1.8%
African	1,730	1.52%
Southeast Asian (Note: Statistic includes total responses of "Filipino" and "Southeast Asian" under visible minority section on census.)	1,625	1.43%
Latin American	1,430	1.26%
Other/multiracial (Note: Statistic includes total responses of "Visible minority, n.i.e." and "Multiple visible minorities" under visible minority section on census.)	800	0.7%
Total responses	113,845	98.47%
Total population	115,610	100%
Notes: Totals greater than 100% due to multiple origin responses. Demographics based on 2022 Canadian federal electoral redistribution riding boundaries.

== History ==
Parliament	Years	Member	Party
Middlesex—London; Riding created from Elgin—Middlesex—London, Lambton—Kent—Middlesex, London Centre, London—Fanshawe, and London West
45th	2025–present	Lianne Rood	Conservative

== Election results ==
2025 Canadian federal election
Party	Candidate	Votes	%	±%	Expenditures
Conservative	Lianne Rood	36,093	51.67	+6.42	$113,258.18
Liberal	Kent Keenan	29,400	42.09	+14.93	$43,516.27
New Democratic	Taylor McIntosh	2,888	4.13	–13.72	$5,040.00
Green	Jim Johnston	698	1.00	–0.81	$1,469.27
People's	Cynthia Workman	577	0.83	–6.93	$580.42
United	Shawn Cartlidge	191	0.27	N/A	$8,245.27
Total valid votes/expense limit		70,199	99.50	–	$140,128.76
Total rejected ballots		352	0.50		
Turnout		70,551	74.53		
Eligible voters		94,662			
Conservative notional hold		Swing		–4.19	
Source: Elections Canada

2021 federal election redistributed results
Party	Vote	%
Conservative	26,642	45.25
Liberal	15,987	27.16
New Democratic	10,506	17.85
People's	4,570	7.76
Green	1,066	1.81
Others	101	0.17

== See also ==
- List of Canadian electoral districts
