= Lianne Rood =

Canadian politician

Lianne Rood MP

Member of Parliament for Middlesex—London Lambton—Kent—Middlesex (2019–2025)
- Incumbent
- Assumed office October 21, 2019
- Preceded by: Bev Shipley

Personal details
- Born: February 27, 1979 (age 47) London, Ontario, Canada
- Party: Conservative Party of Canada
- Profession: entrepreneur and farmer

Lianne Rood MP (born February 27, 1979) is a Canadian politician. She was elected to represent the riding of Middlesex—London in the House of Commons for the Conservative Party of Canada.

== Electoral record ==
2025 Canadian federal election: Middlesex—London
Party	Candidate	Votes	%	±%	Expenditures
Conservative	Lianne Rood	36,093	51.67	+6.42	$113,258.18
Liberal	Kent Keenan	29,400	42.09	+14.93	$43,516.27
New Democratic	Taylor McIntosh	2,888	4.13	–13.72	$5,040.00
Green	Jim Johnston	698	1.00	–0.81	$1,469.27
People's	Cynthia Workman	577	0.83	–6.93	$580.42
United	Shawn Cartlidge	191	0.27	N/A	$8,245.27
Total valid votes/expense limit		70,199	99.50	–	$140,128.76
Total rejected ballots		352	0.50		
Turnout		70,551	74.53		
Eligible voters		94,662			
Conservative notional hold		Swing		–4.19	
Source: Elections Canada

2021 Canadian federal election: Lambton—Kent—Middlesex
Party	Candidate	Votes	%	±%	Expenditures
Conservative	Lianne Rood	29,431	48.5	-0.5	$82,620.80
Liberal	Sudit Ranade	12,552	20.7	-4.7	$52,090.97
New Democratic	Jason Henry	11,107	18.3	+2.3	$24,765.53
People's	Kevin Mitchell	6,567	10.8	+7.7	none listed
Green	Jeremy Hull	1,035	1.7	-4.2	$0.00
Total valid votes/expense limit		60,692	99.3	–	$119,546.07
Total rejected ballots		439	0.7		
Turnout		61,131	67.0		
Eligible voters		91,287			
Conservative hold		Swing		+2.1	
Source: Elections Canada

2019 Canadian federal election: Lambton—Kent—Middlesex
Party	Candidate	Votes	%	±%	Expenditures
Conservative	Lianne Rood	28,651	49.0	-1.21	$54,723.60
Liberal	Jesse McCormick	14,814	25.4	-4.04	$46,738.25
New Democratic	Dylan Mclay	9,355	16.0	-1.03	$12,335.66
Green	Anthony Li	3,463	5.9	+2.61	$4,322.75
People's	Bria Atkins	1,804	3.1	-	none listed
Veterans Coalition	Rob Lalande	325	0.6	-	none listed
Total valid votes/expense limit		58,412	100.0		
Total rejected ballots		434			
Turnout		58,846	66.6		
Eligible voters		88,402			
Conservative hold		Swing		+1.42	
Source: Elections Canada
