= Centralia High School =

Centralia High School may refer to:

- Centralia High School (Illinois)
- Centralia High School (Kansas)
- Centralia High School (Missouri)
- Centralia High School (Centralia, Washington)
