= Centrale =

Centrale may refer to:

== Places ==
- Centrale (Milan Metro), a rail station in Milan, Italy
- Centrale (shopping centre) in Croydon, South London
  - Centrale tram stop, named after the shopping centre above
- Centrale Region, Togo
- 138 East 50th Street, a condominium tower in Midtown Manhattan

== Schools ==
- Centrale Graduate School : Graduate engineering school (France)
  - École centrale de Lille
  - École centrale de Lyon
  - École centrale de Marseille
  - École centrale de Nantes
  - École Centrale Paris

== Other ==
- The os centrale carpal and tarsal bone in the wrists and ankles of land vertebrates

== See also ==
- Central (disambiguation)
- Center (disambiguation)
