= Middlesex Centre =

- Municipality (lower-tier)
- Municipality of Middlesex Centre
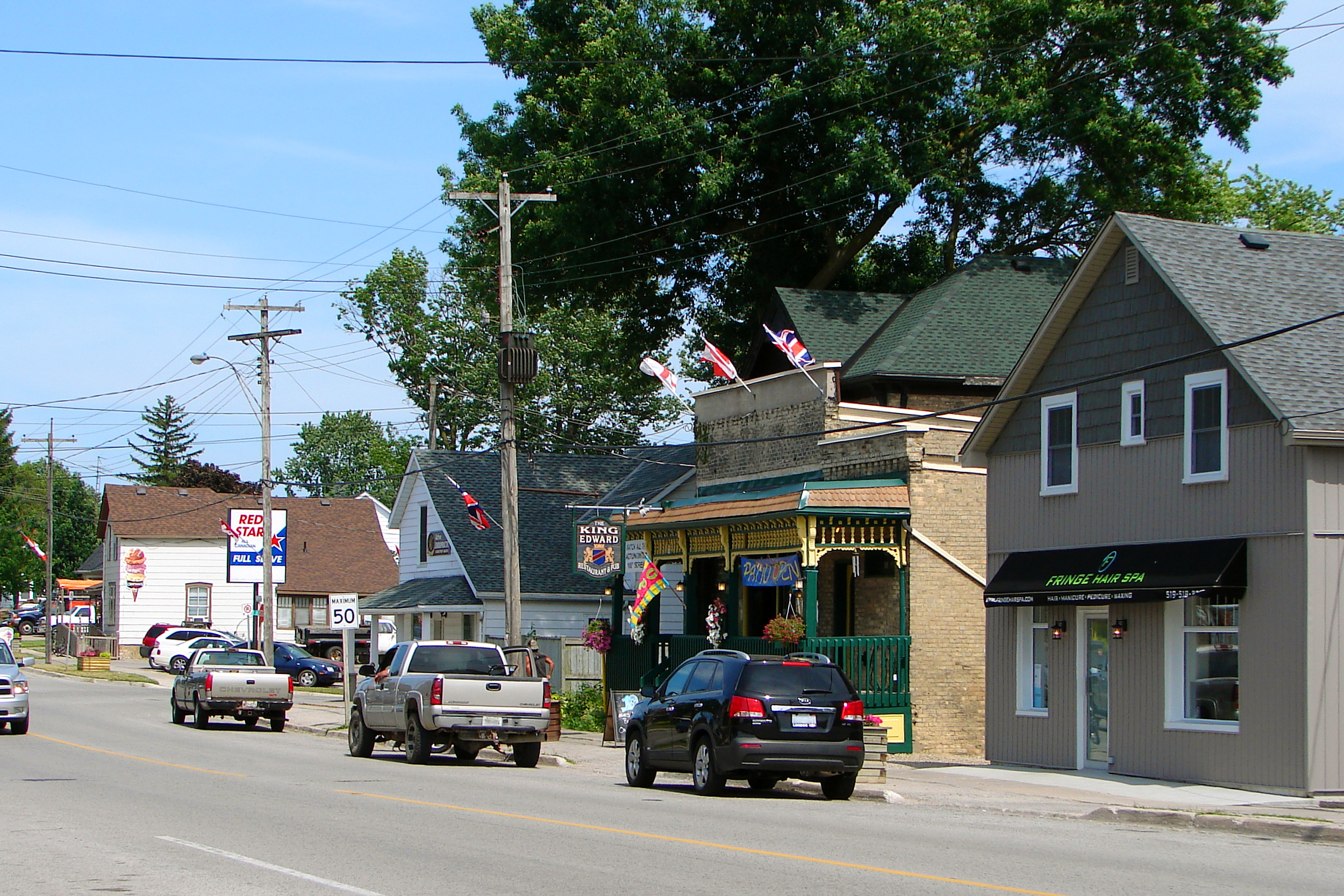
- Ilderton
- Motto: You're In The Right Place
- Location within Middlesex County Location within Southern Ontario
- Coordinates: 43°03′N 81°27′W
- Country: Canada
- Province: Ontario
- County: Middlesex
- Formed: January 1, 1998

Government
  - Type: Municipal
  - Mayor: Aina DeViet
  - Federal riding: Middlesex—London
  - Prov. riding: Lambton—Kent—Middlesex

Area
  - Land: 588.11 km^{2} (227.07 sq mi)
- Elevation: 241 m (791 ft)

Population (2016)
  - Total: 17,262
  - Density: 29.4/km^{2} (76/sq mi)
- Time zone: UTC-5 (EST)
  - Summer (DST): UTC-4 (EDT)
- Postal Code: N0M and N0L
- Area codes: 226, 519, and 548
- Website: www.middlesexcentre.on.ca

Middlesex Centre is a township in Middlesex County, in southwestern Ontario, Canada, north and west of London. The Corporation of the Township of Middlesex Centre formed on January 1, 1998, with the amalgamation of the former Townships of Delaware, Lobo, and London (not to be confused with the adjacent city of London). It is part of the London census metropolitan area.

Middlesex Centre is halfway between two of the five Great Lakes. It is north of Lake Erie, and southeast of Lake Huron. Further to the east of Middlesex Centre is Lake Ontario, while to the west is the much smaller Lake St. Clair. That makes Middlesex Centre very desirable for farming for its frequent precipitation, and it also has higher than normal snowfall from lake-effect snow in the winter, causing desirable spring planting conditions (but also less desirable snow removal issues for its residents).

The same benefits received by the precipitation of the surrounding lakes also subjects the area to severe summer weather conditions because of the convection of any of the surrounding bodies of water in the summer heat. Middlesex Centre suffered a hit by an F3 tornado in 1990 at Komoka.

== Communities ==
Statistics Canada records the following places as being part of Middlesex Centre in 2011: Arva, Ballymote, Birr, Bowood, Bryanston, Coldstream, Delaware, Denfield, Devizes, Duncrief, Ettrick, Fernhill, Ilderton, Ivan, Kilworth Heights, Komoka, Komoka Station, Lansdowne Park, Littlewood, Lobo, Lobo Siding, Lockwood Park, London, Maple Grove, Melrose, Middlesex, Middlesex Centre, Oriole Park Resort, Poplar Hill, Sharon, Southgate, Telfer, Uplands Subdivision, Vanneck.

A record snowfall ("Snow-maggedon") occurred between Dec. 4–8, 2010, affecting Huron and Middlesex Counties. A total of 177 centimetres (70 in) of snow fell during a 102-hour period (it snowed on 98 of those 102 hours).

=== Arva ===
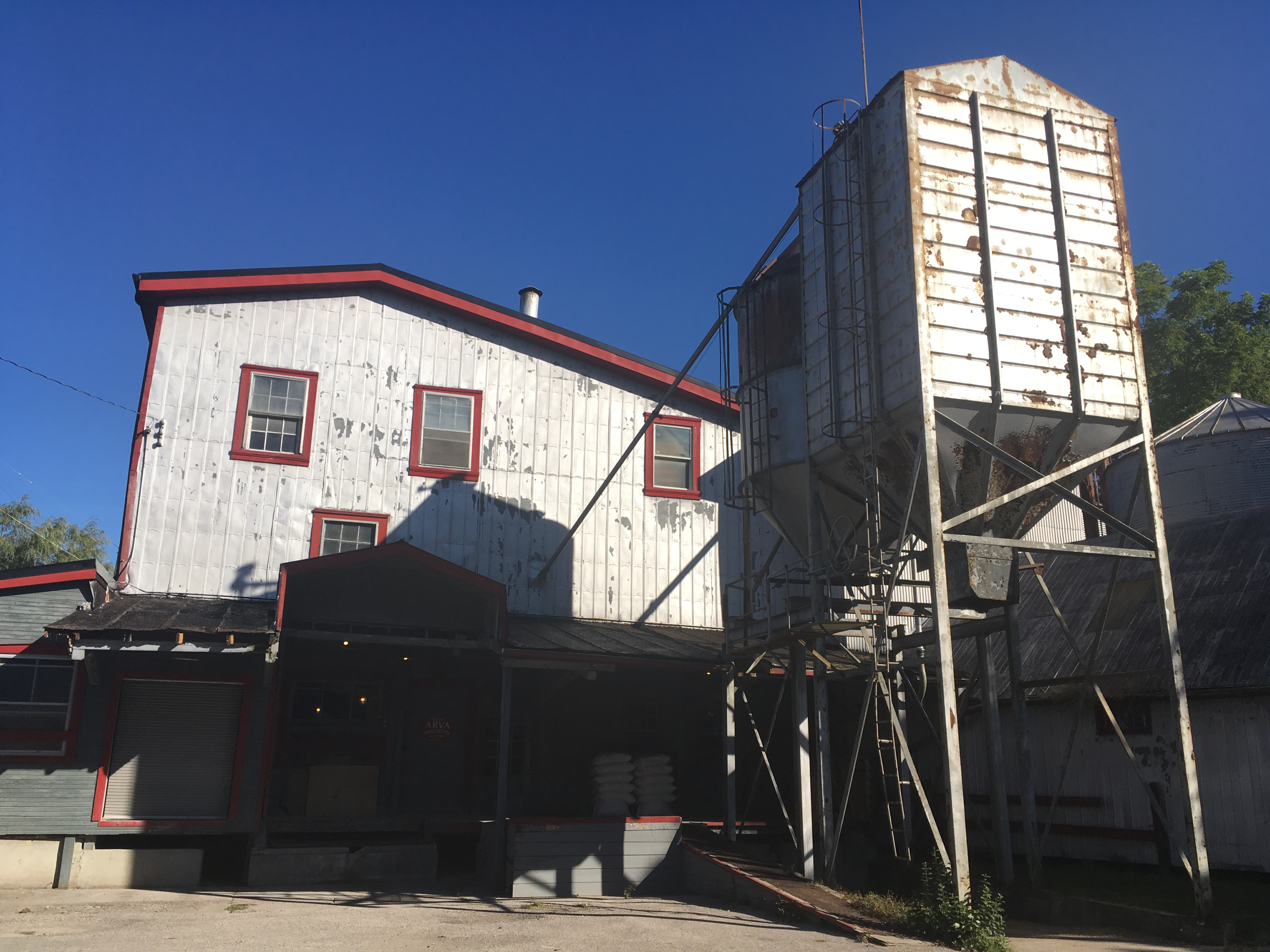
The Flour Mills in Arva

Arva is at the intersection of Provincial Highway 4 (Richmond Street) and Medway Road (7th Concession). The community is the home of Medway High School, Centennial Central Public School, Tamarak tree farm, Weldon Park, the Arva Flour Mill and store, The MillHouse (local, natural and organic foods), a furniture store, a tack shop, a post office, and two churches, as well as personalities such as the former mayor of the City of London, Ontario and former Member of Parliament for London North Centre Joe Fontana, President of University of St. Michael's College at the University of Toronto David Sylvester (academic), and Ben Dreyer, a famous area horseback rider, hunter, tanner, and first nation's skinner. Arva is on a pond (known as "the mill pond") on Medway Creek. There is also a forest known as the sanctuary (in St. John's Estates); the bush runs along the creek and goes down into a camp site that at one time was quite popular.

The demonym for someone from Arva is an Arvite.

In the 19th century, Arva was a critical rest stop on the Underground Railroad, and home to several homes constructed as part of the Railroad.

=== Birr ===
Birr is at the intersection of Highway 4 (Richmond Street) and 13 Mile Road. Despite its small size, Birr has maintained itself and supported various private business throughout the years. There are also three cemeteries, a gift shop called Legg's General Store, a furniture store called This Oak House, and a second-hand book store called Cardinal Books.

Until it was replaced by a modern low-rise concrete bridge in the mid-1970s, Birr had a one-lane iron bridge on the 13th Concession that crossed the Medway Creek. Birr had a hotel in the late 19th century; afternoon stagecoaches running between London and Lucan, 7 miles to the north, would stop overnight in Birr, in those days the approximate half-way point, and resume travel the next day.

=== Coldstream ===
Coldstream is a hamlet in Middlesex Centre with a population of approximately 200. The municipal offices for Middlesex Centre are in Coldstream. Before it became Middlesex Centre by combining the Townships of Delaware, Lobo, and London in 1998, Coldstream was included in Lobo Township and was situated in the centre of Lobo. It is estimated that immigrants from Scotland obtained land grants and settled as early as 1820 in Lobo. Coldstream was previously known as Cutler, probably because the Cutler family operated and owned much of the town. Today Coldstream has an antique and quilt shop, elementary school (Valleyview Public School), fire hall, library, concrete business, conservation area and the Municipal Office for Middlesex Centre, as well as many volunteer organizations and events within the community.

The Friend's Meeting House was established on Quaker Lane in 1850 and a library was organized in 1887.

Much of the industry that Coldstream was founded upon has relocated to larger towns and cities such as Ilderton and London.

=== Delaware ===
Delaware straddles the Thames River, and is accessed by the old highway (Highway 2) linking London and Chatham and the freeway (Highway 402) linking Sarnia along with Port Huron and Toronto. The community of Delaware was first founded in 1796. Delaware was the objective of an American raid into Upper Canada in 1814 during the War of 1812, which resulted in the Battle of Longwoods, on March 4, 1814, just about 24 km outside of Delaware.

Delaware has two elementary schools, Delaware Central Public School (The Mustangs) (Thames Valley District School Board), and Our Lady of Lourdes (The Saints) (London District Catholic School Board). They are about one kilometre apart. Delaware Central has about 175 students, while Our Lady of Lourdes has around 400.

Delaware is nestled in the Thames River Valley, although it has now expanded over the top of the valley ridge. Most of the area surrounding Delaware is made up of forests and floodplain areas. Corn, soybeans and tobacco are farmed extensively in the area around Delaware, as well as inside the town limits in some areas. Delaware has undergone modest growth in housing over the last 30 years, with the developed area nearly doubling in that time. Many of the buildings in the heart of Delaware are reputed to be over one hundred years old. These include the building that is now Delaware Variety as well as the antique shop across the street. Belvoir Manor is a private home that was at one point a seminary and a private school for boys, and at one point was destroyed by fire. The surrounding Belvoir Farms in which it is located is a prominent croquet venue for Croquet Canada.

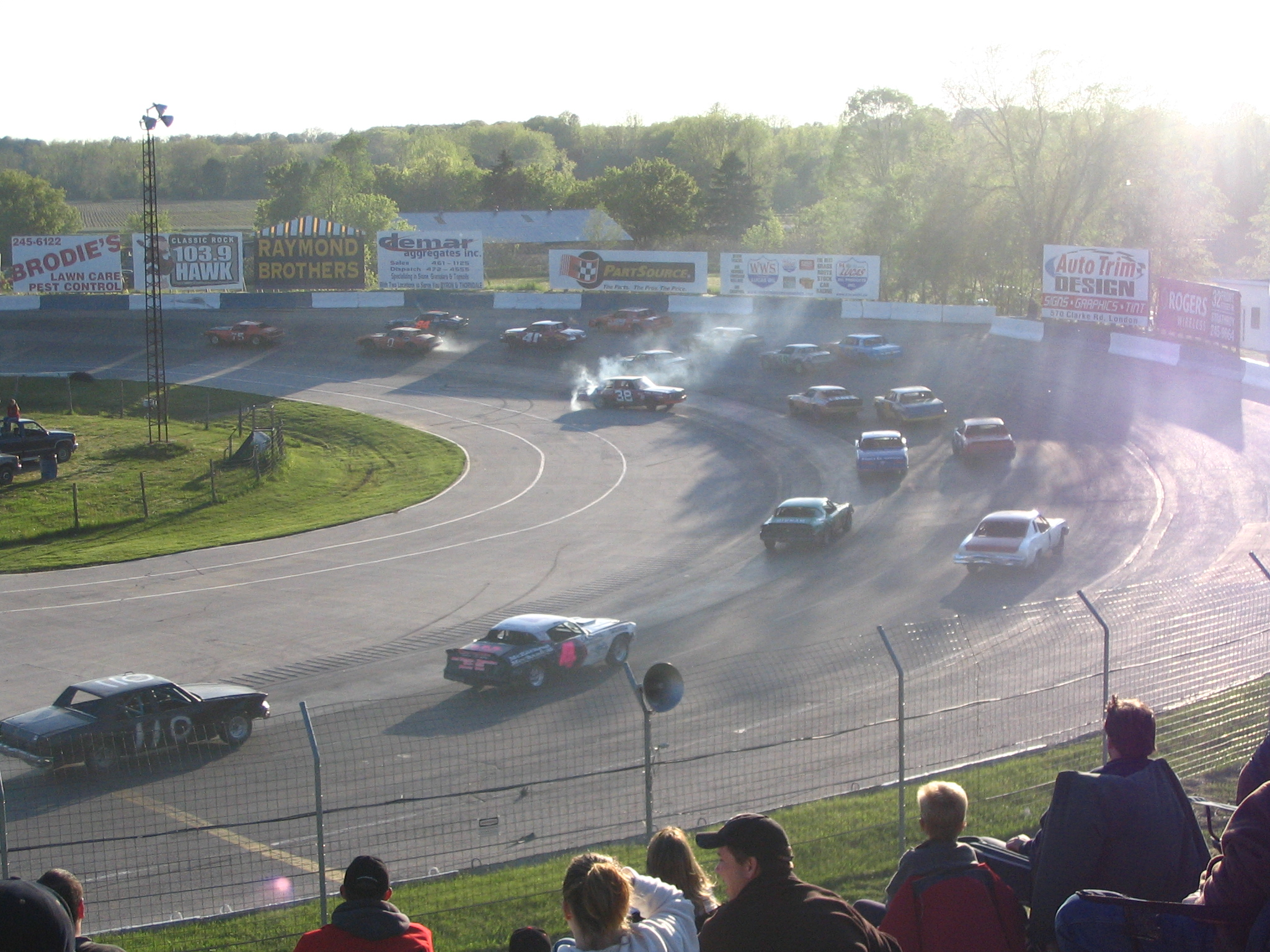
An endurance race at Delaware Speedway

Delaware boasts a number of tourist destinations despite its small size. Delaware Speedway is a half-mile paved race track that is one of the oldest in Canada. The track hosts stock car racing every Friday night during the summer, as well as several Saturday and Sunday race features. The track has also hosted major concert events in the past including I Mother Earth and Matthew Good. The Longwoods Road Conservation Area features Skah-Nah-Doht, a recreated Iroquoian village complete with longhouses and tours, as well as a museum featuring exhibits of Iroquoian culture and archaeological artifacts. The park hosts a yearly native festival as well as a re-enactment of the Battle of Longwoods.

=== Elginfield ===
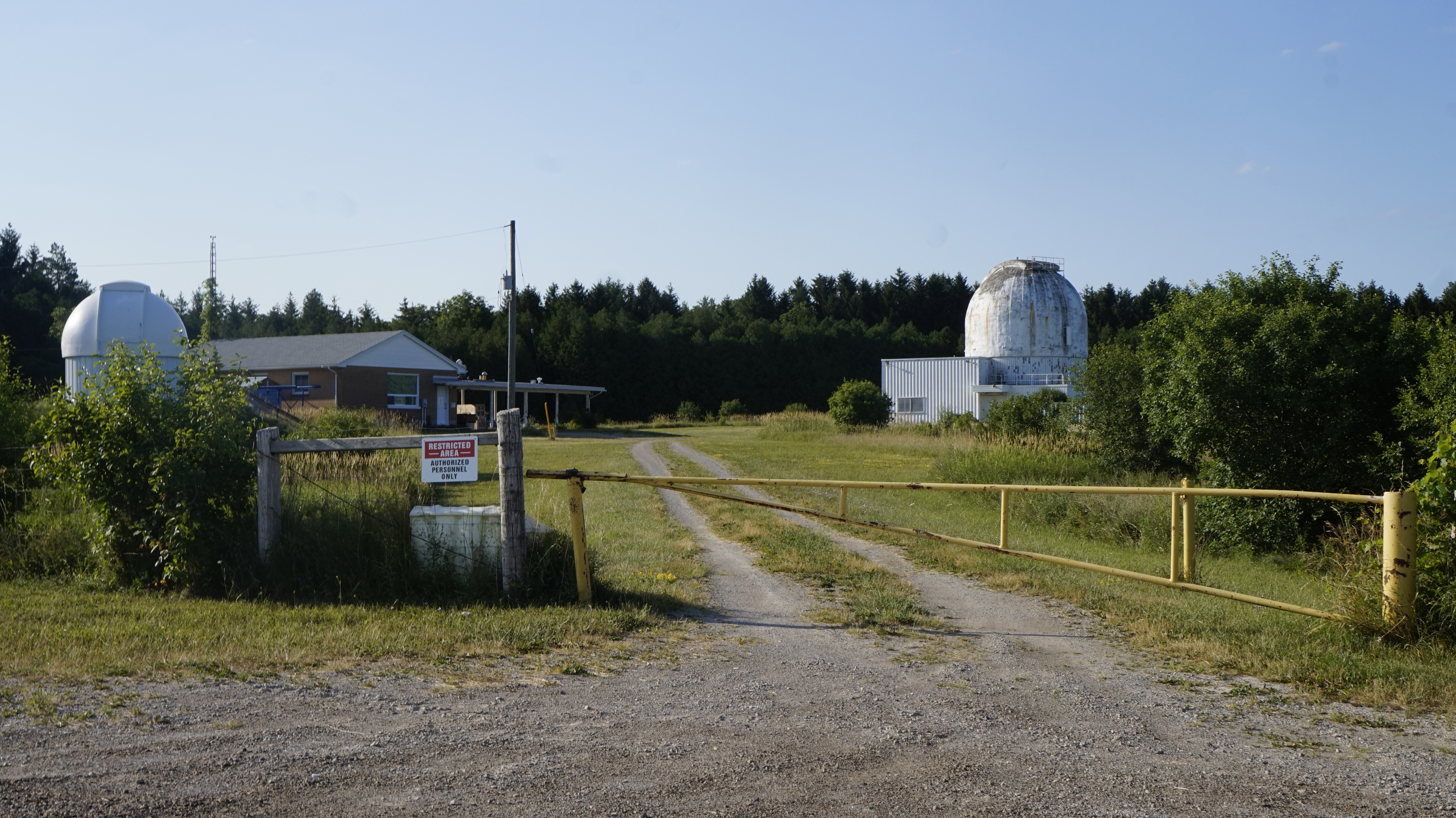
Site of former Elginfield Observatory in 2022

Elginfield is at the corner of Highway 4 and Highway 7, with the junction of Highway 23 just to the east. The University of Western Ontario operated the observatory and its 1.2 metre telescope near the community until the end of 2010. However, the site is still owned and in use by the university today, mainly by research groups for testing automated and robotic observatory camera systems.

=== Ilderton ===
Ilderton is along Middlesex County Road 16 (Ilderton Road) to the west of Highway 4 (Richmond Street), at the junction of Middlesex County Road 20 (Hyde Park Road). Prior to the late 1990s, the village was also accessible by railway. CN Rail had a rail line running north from Hyde Park to Clinton through the village. This rail line was abandoned from Ilderton north to Centralia in 1988, and south of Ilderton circa 1996. The portion of the former rail line south of County Road 16 has been converted to parkland.

The Ilderton Independent Telephone Company served the Ilderton exchange until 1962 when the operations were acquired by The Bell Telephone Company of Canada. Ilderton is within boundary of three telephone area codes (NPA); 226, 519 and 548. Three telephone exchanges (NXX) are in operation for the Ilderton area, 519-666 (Bell) who provide traditional land-line services and DSL, 519-298 (Execulink Telecom) providers of Cable VOIP telephone services, and 226-308 (Quadro Communications - a co-op independent telecom). The majority of the 16,000 residents of the Municipality of Middlesex Centre are identified as "Ilderton" in the telephone directories, with the exception of extreme southwest area of the Municipality (Komoka and Kilworth) who are assigned "London" telephone numbers out of the Hyde Park Exchange. In February 2014, Ilderton celebrated the 150th Anniversary of the local Post Office. The first postmaster, named the Village "Ilderton" based on the village of Ilderton, Northumberland, UK, where he emigrated from.

Ilderton is home to a district fire station (As of March 31, 2014 - Emergency calls are answered by the Strathroy-Caradoc Police Service in nearby Strathroy, ending a decades long agreement with the nearby City of London.), Police Services are provided under contract with the OPP Middlesex County detachment. EMS/Ambulance Medical Services are provided by Station 14 in North West London, (approximately five minutes from Ilderton). The village houses a seniors apartment complex, a restaurant, two convenience stores, two gas stations, and a garage, a DIY Car Wash, 24-hour fitness facility, three hair salons, florist, computer sales and repair business, a county library, medical centre, a nature trail, two pizza businesses, and three parks - one of which contains a splash pad for children, and numerous home businesses. As the community is surrounded mainly by agricultural land, industry in the area is mostly farming.

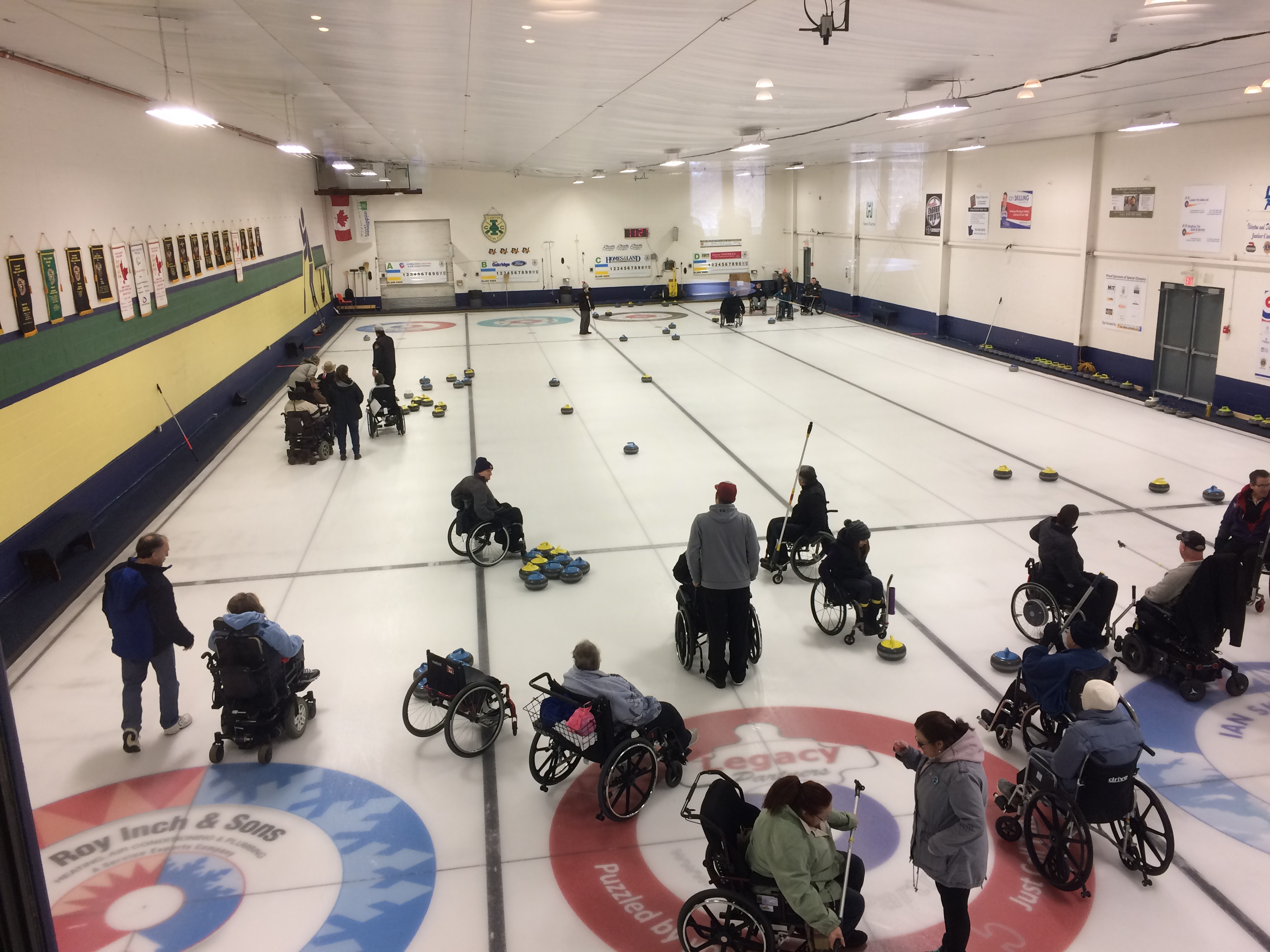
Curling matches in Ilderton

The Ilderton Fair is one of the largest country fairs in Southern Ontario and brings huge crowds to the village every fall. The fall parade can take over an hour to go by and the events at the fairground and arena entertain young and old alike all weekend. At other times of the year the fairgrounds host many agricultural and equine events, the arena is home to sporting events year-round and is the focus for local hockey through the fall to spring. Alongside the arena is the Ilderton Curling Club. It has a 4-sheet surface and a bar overlooking the ice. During the winter Ilderton becomes a hub for snow-mobilers as there are several trails which pass through or close by plus the availability of fuel for both machines and riders.

Ilderton is the hometown of ice dancer Scott Moir, who captured Gold with partner Tessa Virtue at the 2010 Winter Olympic Games in Vancouver, British Columbia. The pair also earned two silver medals at the 2014 Winter Olympic Games in Sochi, Russia and two gold medals at the 2018 Winter Olympic Games in PyeongChang, South Korea. They are the most decorated Figure Skaters in Olympic history.

Ilderton is also the hometown of former NHL forward Matt Read.

=== Komoka ===
Komoka village is a crossing point for many railway lines and was formerly a railway hot spot featuring various hotels and development. Today, the Komoka Railway museum keeps the local railway history alive and features unique artifacts such as a 1913 Shay Steam Engine and a 1972 Grand Trunk Western caboose. There is an elementary school - Parkview Public School, and Providence Reformed Collegiate − a private Christian high school, and the new Komoka Wellness Centre in the village. The village also supports a number of youth sports teams, including baseball and soccer. The Komoka Park has two baseball and two soccer fields, tennis courts, and a children's play area. There are two small business areas in the village: the downtown Komoka Foodtown and Post Office area, and the Glendon Drive / Komoka Road intersection with a bank, gas stations and variety stores, restaurants, and hair salon.

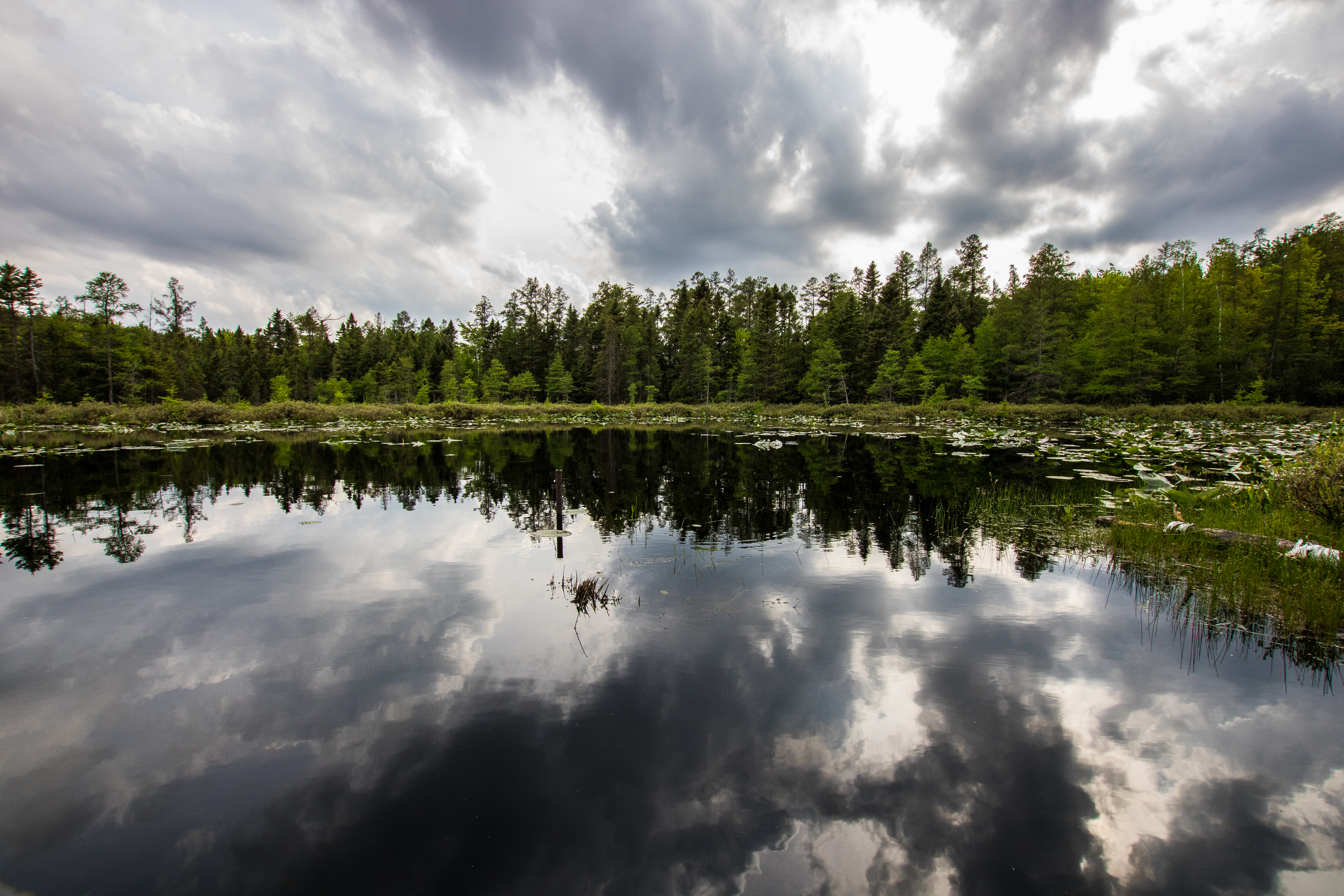
A view from a lake inside Komoka Provincial Park

Komoka is experiencing a population growth due to several new subdivision developments. Consequently, the elementary school's enrolment has rapidly increased resulting in substantial renovations. In 1986 a 20 unit seniors apartment building was built and named the Malott Apartments, after the Late Arthur Malott who donated all the funds for its construction. In 2009 a second 20 unit seniors apartment building was added to form the Komoka Seniors Apartments Complex. In 2011 the new Komoka Community Wellness Centre was opened and is home to the Elgin Middlesex Chiefs AAA Hockey teams, Komoka Kings Jr. B hockey team of the GOJHL, and was home to the Komoka Dragons Jr A hockey team of the GMHL. It also offers a YMCA fitness centre, walking track, two NHL size ice rinks, a library, meeting rooms, and an outside children's play area. Komoka Provincial Park with walking trails is close by, as well as FireRock, so named because of finding an old native fire rock on the site during the new golf course construction, Oxbow Glen Golf and Country Club and The Oaks golf courses. The village has a Middlesex County EMS satellite ambulance station.

In partnership with Delaware and Mount Brydges, the three communities rotate responsibilities of hosting Canada Day celebrations. The partnership is called "Del-Ko-Brydge". The celebrations, which has been held every year since 1981, feature a free pancake breakfast, morning parade, events and competitions throughout the day, a baseball game at night with fireworks following the game.

=== Kilworth Heights ===
Kilworth Heights takes up most of the area between Komoka and London which is south of County Road 14 (Glendon Rd) and north of Komoka Provincial Park and the Thames River. It is separate from Kilworth, which lies along Glendon Rd on the east side of the Thames River and is part of London.

Although Kilworth Heights is part of Middlesex Centre, demographically most of Kilworth Heights is a commuting exurb of Komoka. It has no independent industry, no schools, no major grocery store, no banks, and only two small commercial areas, including child care, veterinarian, restaurant, and a gas bar. All the rest of Kilworth Heights is single-unit residential. "Old" Kilworth Heights, to the east, still relies on individual wells and septic tanks. "New" Kilworth Heights, to the west, receives water and septic services from Komoka. Recent residential development in the western part of Kilworth Heights is responsible for much of Middlesex Centre's population growth.

Middlesex Centre experiences severe weather annually. In 1990, the Komoka Community Church, which lies halfway between Komoka and Kilworth Heights, was destroyed down to the foundation by an F2 tornado.

== Demographics ==
Historical population
| Year | Pop. | ±% |
|---|---|---|
| 1996 | 12,985 | — |
| 2001 | 14,242 | +9.7% |
| 2006 | 15,589 | +9.5% |
| 2011 | 16,487 | +5.8% |
| 2016 | 17,262 | +4.7% |

In the 2021 Census of Population conducted by Statistics Canada, Middlesex Centre had a population of 18,928 living in 6,695 of its 6,845 total private dwellings, a change of 9.7% from its 2016 population of 17,262. With a land area of 588.16 km^{2} (227.09 sq mi), it had a population density of 32.2/km^{2} (83.4/sq mi) in 2021.

Canada census – Middlesex Centre community profile

| | 2021 | 2016 | 2011 |
| Population | 18,928 (+9.7% from 2016) | 17,262 (+4.7% from 2011) | 16,487 (+5.8% from 2006) |
| Land area | 588.16 km^{2} (227.09 sq mi) | 588.11 km^{2} (227.07 sq mi) | 588.15 km^{2} (227.09 sq mi) |
| Population density | 32.2/km^{2} (83/sq mi) | 29.4/km^{2} (76/sq mi) | 28.0/km^{2} (73/sq mi) |
| Median age | 43.6 (M: 43.2, F: 43.6) | 43.5 (M: 43.5, F: 43.5) | 42.4 (M: 42.5, F: 42.4) |
| Private dwellings | 6,845 (total) 6,695 (occupied) | 6,139 (total) | 5,808 (total) |
| Median household income | $125,000 | $108,971 |

References: 2021 2016 2011

== See also ==
- List of townships in Ontario
