= Arnt Erickson =

American politician

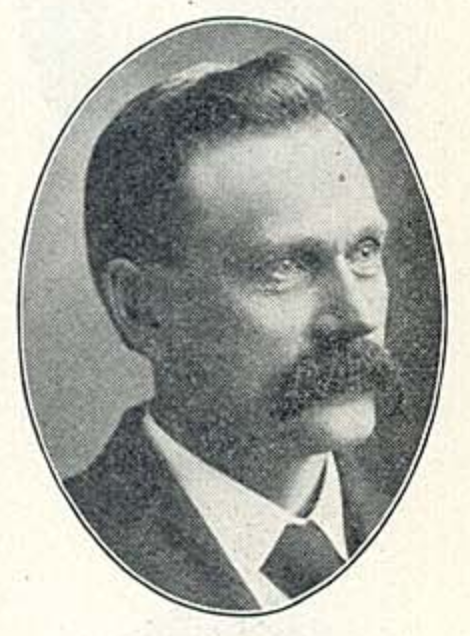
Arnt Erickson, Wisconsin businessman and politician

Arnt Erickson (July 4, 1866 – September 8, 1932) was an American businessman and politician from New Auburn, Wisconsin who spent a single term as a member of the Wisconsin State Assembly, as well as holding many local offices.

== Background ==
Erickson was born in Norway July 4, 1866, and came to Wisconsin in 1882. He would remain there for the rest of his life, except for a period of about two years spent in the state of Colorado. He attended public schools in Norway and in Chippewa County. On April 27, 1890, he was living in Eau Claire when he married Tillie Christianson. For six years he worked as a retail clerk in a clothing store in Chippewa Falls, and became a merchant himself in New Auburn and Chippewa Falls. He later went into real estate and banking at New Auburn, serving as co-founder (in 1907) and first president of the Bank of New Auburn (now Security Bank, New Auburn); and as president of the Farmers Store Co. in New Auburn.

== Public office ==
As of 1909, he had been a member of the school board for about eighteen years and had served as chairman of the town of Auburn and supervisor of the village of New Auburn. He had been a member of the county board of supervisors of Chippewa County for eight years, and four times elected chairman of that body. He was elected to the Assembly in 1908 as a Republican, with 2,887 votes to 1,330 for Democrat G. W. Heaverin (the Republican incumbent, Theodore M. Thomas, was not a candidate). He was assigned to the standing committee on third reading.

He did not run for re-election, and was succeeded by fellow Republican Chris P. Ellingson (also a native of Norway). Erickson rejected suggestions in later years that he return to state politics, preferring to stick to local affairs. At the time of his death, he was again chairman of the county board, on which he had served for thirty-two years representing New Auburn, including nine years as chairman.

== Death ==
He died September 8, 1932, after being confined to bed for two weeks for an unspecified illness which had afflicted him less severely for years. Tillie was still alive at that time.
