= Carl Nyman =

Carl Nyman may refer to:

- Carl Fredrik Nyman (1820–1893), Swedish botanist
- Carl R. Nyman (1895–1983), American businessman and politician
