= Jorge W. Carow =

American lawyer and politician (1874–1936)

54th Speaker of the Wisconsin State Assembly
- In office January 7, 1935 – November 5, 1936 (died)
- Preceded by: Cornelius T. Young
- Succeeded by: Paul Alfonsi

Member of the Wisconsin State Assembly from the Rusk–Sawyer district
- In office January 7, 1929 – November 5, 1936 (died)
- Preceded by: Alfred Schultz
- Succeeded by: Carl R. Nyman

Personal details
- Born: April 20, 1874 Baraboo, Wisconsin, U.S.
- Died: November 5, 1936 (aged 62) Ladysmith, Wisconsin, U.S.
- Resting place: Riverside Cemetery, Ladysmith
- Party: Progressive; Republican (before 1934)
- Spouse: Avis Aurelia McGilvera (m. 1906–1936)
- Children: Wilmer Stewart Carow^{(b. 1910; died 1988)}; John Carow^{(b. 1913; died 1995)}; P. Jean Carow^{(died 1918)}
- Education: University of Wisconsin Law School
- Profession: Lawyer, politician

Jorge Wilmer Carow (April 20, 1874 – November 5, 1936) was an American lawyer and Progressive Republican politician from Rusk County, Wisconsin. He was the 54th speaker of the Wisconsin State Assembly (1935–1936) and served four terms in the Assembly representing Rusk and Sawyer counties.

== Early life and education ==
Jorge Carow was born and raised in Baraboo, Wisconsin, educated in the common schools there. As a young man, he attended the University of Wisconsin, and graduated from the University of Wisconsin Law School in 1902. He was selected from his graduating class to serve a one year term as associate in the Madison law firm of law professor John M. Olin. After his year working at Olin & Butler, Carow returned to Baraboo and formed a law partnership with Edward Dithmar.

In 1907, Carow left Baraboo and moved to Ladysmith, Wisconsin, where he resided for the rest of his life. In Ladysmith, he started a new law firm in partnership with Theodore M. Thomas.

== Political career ==
A year after settling in Ladysmith, Carow made his first attempt at public office, seeking the Republican Party nomination for district attorney of Rusk County, Wisconsin. Carow narrowly lost the Republican nomination to A. N. Anderson, falling just four votes short. After the close result, Carow decided to run as an independent candidate. With no other candidates on the ballot, the general election was a rematch of the Republican primary, and Anderson prevailed again. He ran again for district attorney in 1910, challenging Anderson in the Republican primary. A third candidate, Charles Kirwan, also ran and defeated both of them.

After his second defeat, Carow devoted the next decade mostly to his legal career. In 1915, a man attempted to shoot Carow while he was working in his law offices. Carow managed to wrestle the gun from the elderly attacker. The gunman, Stephen Duprey, had formerly owned land in Ladysmith and lost his property in legal action in which Carow and Thomas represented the opposing party.

He returned to politics in 1928, running for Wisconsin State Assembly in the district composed of Rusk and Sawyer counties. He faced another contested Republican primary, at the time he was identified as a supporter of prohibition and a member of the stalwart faction of Republicans. In the primary, Carow defeated his two Republican opponents, William B. Arnold and E. S. Spears, receiving 44.8% of the vote. He easily defeated his Democratic opponent in the general election, receiving 82% of the vote. Before taking office, Carow made statewide news announcing that he would propose a law to mandate life imprisonment for persons convicted of four felonies, modeled on the New York Baumes law.

Carow was re-elected without opposition in 1930, and was by that time identified as having progressive sympathies. Although he went on to claim that he was not a progressive, he carried important progressive priorities during the 60th Wisconsin Legislature, including a constitutional amendment easing debt limitations to allow more public ownership of utilities. Also during that session, Carow authored a redistricting act which avoided any significant changes to the districts. Milwaukee County's representatives had sought to increase their Assembly representation from 20 to 24 seats, to account for their rapid population growth, but Carow's position prevailed. By the 1932 election, Carow was running for renomination as a progressive, and defeated stalwart candidate A. G. Krause. He won the general election with 57% of the vote.

After the Wisconsin Progressive Party formally split from the Republican Party of Wisconsin in 1934, Carow finally accepted the label and became a progressive. Carow faced no opposition for the Progressive Party nomination, and went onto a general election against three opponents. He won the election with just 35% of the vote. The Progressive Party won the most Assembly seats in the 62nd Wisconsin Legislature, and elected Carow as their candidate for speaker of the Assembly. Since no party had a majority, it took several rounds of voting; Carow was elected speaker on the 6th ballot, with the support of six Republicans and one socialist.

Carow was re-elected to a fifth term on November 3, 1936, but died of a sudden heart attack two days later, at his home in Ladysmith.

Wisconsin State Assembly
Preceded by Alfred Schultz	Member of the Wisconsin State Assembly from the Rusk–Sawyer district January 7, 1929 – November 5, 1936 (died)	Succeeded by Carl R. Nyman
Preceded by Cornelius T. Young	Speaker of the Wisconsin State Assembly; January 7, 1935 – November 5, 1936 (died)	Succeeded by Paul Alfonsi
