= Cornelius T. Young =

American politician (1907–1980)

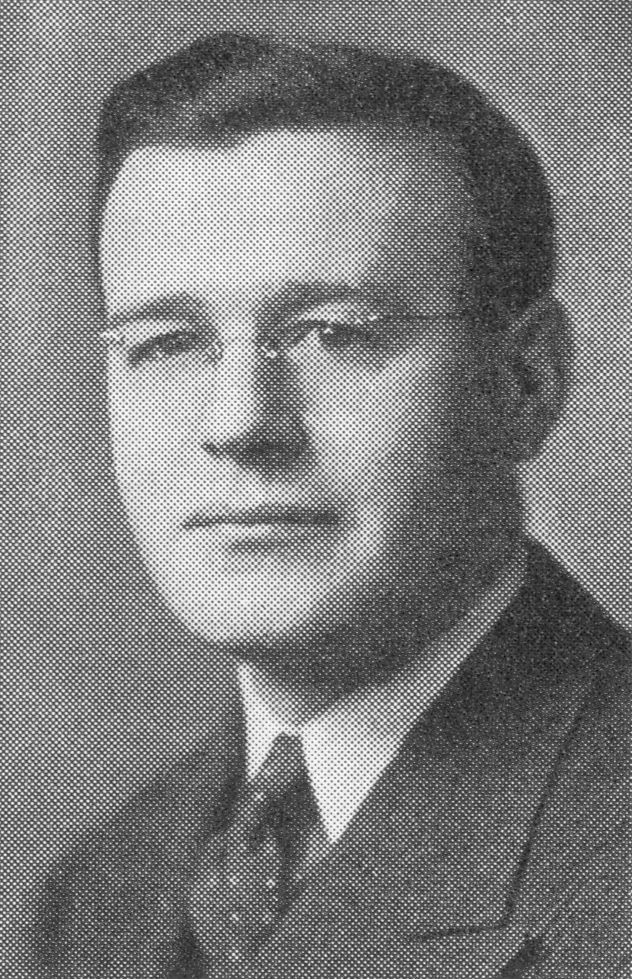
- Young in 1940 book

Member of the Wisconsin Senate from the 9th district
- In office January 2, 1939 – January 4, 1943
- Preceded by: James L. Callan
- Succeeded by: Robert Emmet Tehan

53rd Speaker of the Wisconsin State Assembly
- In office January 11, 1933 – January 7, 1935
- Preceded by: Charles B. Perry
- Succeeded by: Jorge W. Carow

Member of the Wisconsin State Assembly from the Milwaukee 1st district
- In office January 5, 1931 – January 2, 1939
- Preceded by: Thomas H. Conway
- Succeeded by: Walter J. Domach

Personal details
- Born: July 28, 1907 Milwaukee, Wisconsin, U.S.
- Died: July 25, 1980 (aged 72) Milwaukee, Wisconsin, U.S.
- Party: Democratic
- Spouse: Lucy Reilly
- Children: Cornelius Jr, Kathleen, Margaret, Patricia, James
- Education: University of Wisconsin Law School
- Occupation: Politician; lawyer
- Employer: Wisconsin Electric (1942–1972)

Cornelius Thomas Young (July 28, 1907 – July 25, 1980) was an American lawyer and Democratic politician from Milwaukee, Wisconsin. He was a member of the Wisconsin Senate and Wisconsin State Assembly, and served as the 53rd speaker of the Wisconsin State Assembly when the Democrats held the majority in the 1933 legislative session. He was 24 years old at the start of that session. He was 25 years old when he rose to the speakership, making him the youngest speaker in the history of the Wisconsin Legislature, and second youngest leader of a legislature on the State or Federal level.. He later worked as a lawyer and lobbyist for Wisconsin Electric.

== Early life ==
Cornelius Thomas Young was born on July 28, 1907, in Milwaukee, Wisconsin. He graduated from St. John's Military Academy. He received his law degree from University of Wisconsin Law School in 1931 and practiced law.

== Career ==
Young represented the old 1st District of the Wisconsin State Assembly from 1931 to 1938, where he served as speaker in 1933 and 1934. He represented the old 9th District of the Wisconsin State Senate from 1939 to 1942. He was also a delegate to the 1940 Democratic National Convention.

Young was appointed assistant legal counsel for Wisconsin Electric in 1942. He became the utility's legislative spokesperson and vice president in 1955. He retired in 1972.

== Death ==
Young died of cancer on July 25, 1980, at St. Mary's Hospital in Milwaukee.

Wisconsin State Assembly
Preceded by Thomas H. Conway	Member of the Wisconsin State Assembly from the Milwaukee 1st district January 5, 1931 – January 2, 1939	Succeeded by Walter J. Domach
Preceded by Charles B. Perry	Speaker of the Wisconsin State Assembly; January 11, 1933 – January 7, 1935	Succeeded by Jorge W. Carow
Wisconsin Senate
Preceded by James L. Callan	Member of the Wisconsin Senate from the 9th district January 2, 1939 – January 4, 1943	Succeeded by Robert Emmet Tehan
