= Norman Spencer =

Norman Spencer may refer to:

- Norman Spencer (composer) (1891–1940), American composer
- Norman Spencer (politician) (1902–1966), Canadian politician, member of the Canadian House of Commons
- Norman Spencer (producer) (1914–2024), British film producer and screenwriter
- Norman Spencer (philanthropist) (1891–1968), New Zealand businessperson from Auckland
- Norm Spencer (1958–2020), Canadian actor and voice actor
- Harrison Ford's character in the film What Lies Beneath
