= Staka =

Staka may refer to:

- Roux § Cretan staka, a Cretan roux dish made from goat milk fat
- Andrea Štaka, a Swiss film director
- Chip Staka, a fictional character in a children's book Turntable Timmy
- Staka Skenderova, a Bosnian Serb teacher, social worker, writer and folklorist
