= Detroit Business Institute =

School in Riverview, Michigan, US

Coordinates: 42°10′09.5″N 83°11′28.8″W

The Detroit Business Institute (previously known as Detroit Business University and Goldsmith, Bryant & Stratton Business College) is an educational institute focusing on medical training founded in Detroit, Michigan. The school has held several campuses but is now located in Detroit, Michigan.

== History ==
The antecedent school, the Goldsmith Business College, was founded by W. D. Cochrane and located at the corner of Larned and Woodward Avenue about four blocks north of the Detroit River. In 1857 Cochrane sold the school to Bryant and Stratton, who moved it to the Merrill Block where J. H. Goldsmith managed the institution as a branch of Bryant & Stratton College. When the Detroit Business University was formed Goldsmith was its first president. In 1874 the institution moved to the corner of Griswold Street and Lafayette Avenue.

Spencerian Business College was a successor of the Mayhew Business College that had operated in Albion, Michigan beginning in 1859.

The Detroit Business University was founded in 1887 by the merger of Spencerian Business College (founded in 1883) and Goldsmith Business College (founded in 1850). One of its early presidents was William F. Jewell, while Platt R. Spencer, who had headed the Spencerian Business College, was the head of the school's penmanship department.

Among the students who studied at institutions that became the Detroit Business University was Henry Ford.

The Gutchess Metropolitan Business College also later merged with the Detroit Business University.

In the 1930s the institution was still known as the Detroit Business University, but apparently by the 1950s it had changed its name to the Detroit Business Institute.

In the 1960s it began a collegiate institute in Dearborn, Michigan. In 1964 this became the Detroit College of Business. In the 2000s, the school had a campus in Southfield, Michigan, but that location has since closed. Now the school has one main campus, located in Riverview, Michigan.

== Academics ==
The school offers the following programs:

- Medical Assistant
- Practical Nurse
- Medical Office

DBI was formerly accredited as a non-degree-granting institution approved to grant diplomas and certificates by the Accrediting Council for Independent Colleges and Schools (ACICS). However, in 2016 the United States Secretary of Education denied ACICS's accrediting status for failing to meet 21 recognition criteria. It is now accredited by the Accrediting Commission of Career Schools and Colleges. Additionally, the Practical Nurse program is approved by the Michigan Board of Nursing.

== Notable alumni ==
- Albert Cobo, former mayor of Detroit
- Frank G. Dionesopulos, politician
- Walter J. Domach, politician
- Henry Ford, industrialist, philanthropist
- John Lesinski, Sr., politician
- Sidney Cecil Robinson, Canadian politician
- Fred W. Springer, politician
- Jamie Thompson, politician
