= Chief Lake, Wisconsin =

Census-designated place in Wisconsin, United States

- CDP
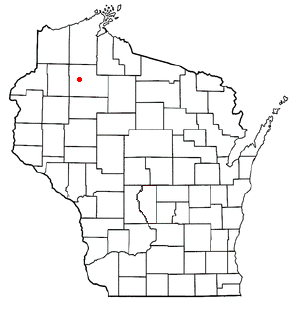
- Location of Chief Lake, Wisconsin
- Coordinates: 45°54′4″N 91°20′17″W
- Country: United States
- State: Wisconsin
- County: Sawyer

Area
  - Total: 23.6 sq mi (61.2 km^{2})
  - Land: 21.1 sq mi (54.6 km^{2})
  - Water: 2.5 sq mi (6.5 km^{2})
- Elevation: 1,339 ft (408 m)

Population (2020)
  - Total: 582
  - Density: 27.6/sq mi (10.7/km^{2})
- Time zone: UTC-6 (Central (CST))
  - Summer (DST): UTC-5 (CDT)
- Area codes: 715 & 534
- FIPS code: 55-14440
- GNIS feature ID: 1867655

Chief Lake is a census-designated place (CDP) in the town of Hayward, Sawyer County, Wisconsin, United States. The population was 582 at the 2020 census.

== Geography ==
Chief Lake is located at 45°54′4″N 91°20′17″W (45.901133, -91.338160).

According to the United States Census Bureau, the CDP has a total area of 23.6 square miles (61.2 km^{2}), of which 21.1 square miles (54.6 km^{2}) is land and 2.5 square miles (6.5 km^{2}) (10.67%) is water.

== Demographics ==
Historical population
Census	Pop.	Note	%±
2000	625		—
2010	583		−6.7%
2020	582		−0.2%
U.S. Decennial Census

As of the census of 2000, there were 625 people, 211 households, and 158 families residing in the CDP. The population density was 29.6 people per square mile (11.4/km^{2}). There were 430 housing units at an average density of 20.4/sq mi (7.9/km^{2}). The racial makeup of the CDP was 22.56% White, 0.16% African American, 76.96% Native American, and 0.32% from two or more races. Hispanic or Latino of any race were 0.96% of the population.

There were 211 households, out of which 35.1% had children under the age of 18 living with them, 40.8% were married couples living together, 22.7% had a female householder with no husband present, and 25.1% were non-families. 20.4% of all households were made up of individuals, and 9.0% had someone living alone who was 65 years of age or older. The average household size was 2.95 and the average family size was 3.30.

In the CDP, the population was spread out, with 32.8% under the age of 18, 8.3% from 18 to 24, 25.9% from 25 to 44, 20.3% from 45 to 64, and 12.6% who were 65 years of age or older. The median age was 35 years. For every 100 females, there were 97.2 males. For every 100 females age 18 and over, there were 101.0 males.

The median income for a household in the CDP was $33,125, and the median income for a family was $32,500. Males had a median income of $28,182 versus $21,625 for females. The per capita income for the CDP was $12,486. About 8.8% of families and 10.0% of the population were below the poverty line, including 4.4% of those under age 18 and 7.0% of those age 65 or over.
