= Herb Gray =

7th deputy prime minister of Canada

The Right Honourable Herb Gray PC CC QC
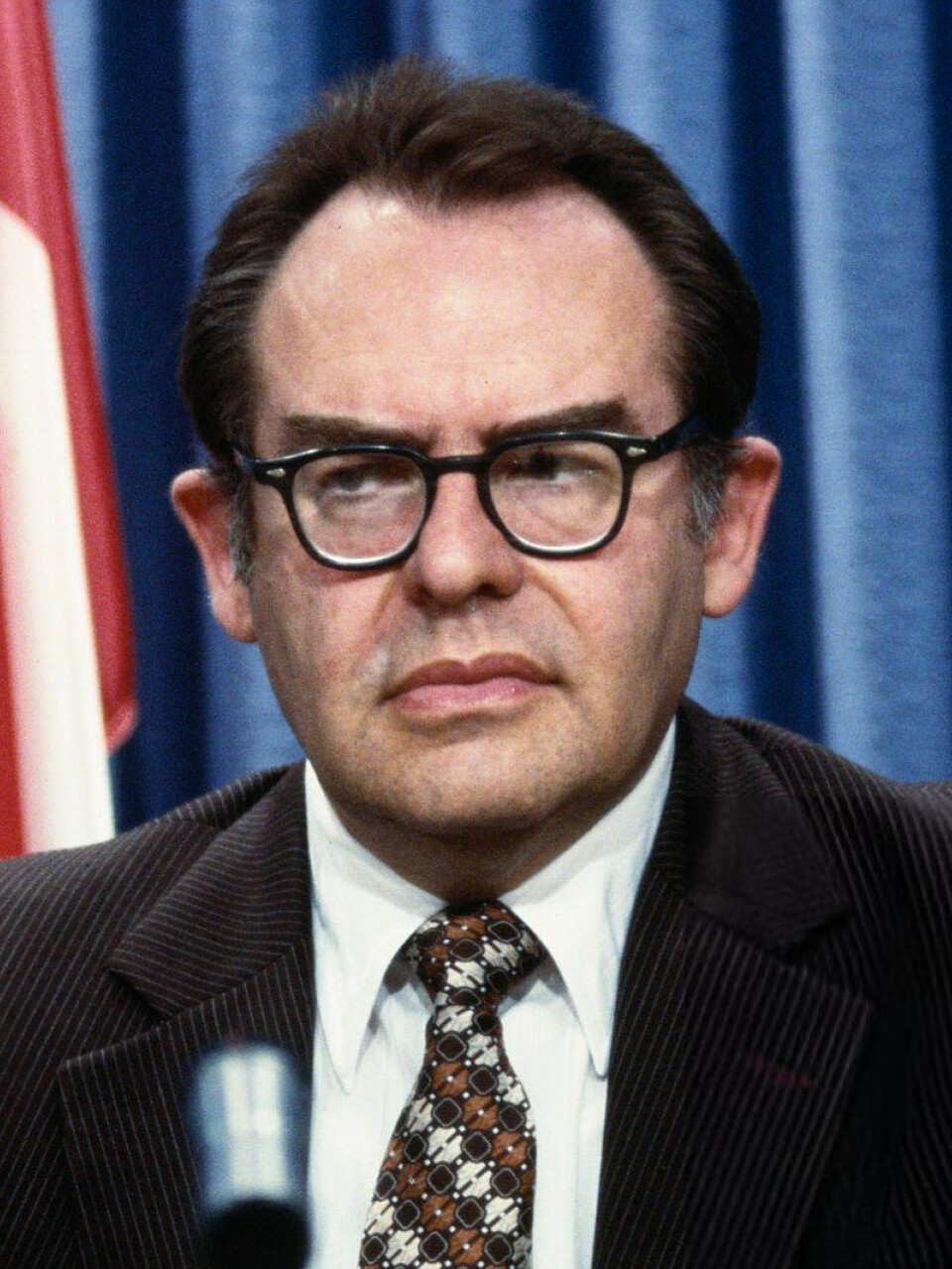
- Gray, c. 1980

7th Deputy Prime Minister of Canada
- In office June 11, 1997 – January 14, 2002
- Prime Minister: Jean Chrétien
- Preceded by: Sheila Copps
- Succeeded by: John Manley

Leader of the Government in the House of Commons
- In office November 4, 1993 – April 27, 1997
- Prime Minister: Jean Chrétien
- Preceded by: Doug Lewis
- Succeeded by: Don Boudria

Leader of the Opposition
- In office February 8, 1990 – December 10, 1990
- Preceded by: John Turner
- Succeeded by: Jean Chrétien
Cabinet positions
President of the Treasury Board
In office September 30, 1982 – September 16, 1984
Prime Minister	Pierre Trudeau; John Turner
Preceded by	Donald Johnston
Succeeded by	Robert de Cotret
Minister of Regional Industrial Expansion
In office January 12, 1982 – September 29, 1982
Prime Minister	Pierre Trudeau
Preceded by	Pierre De Bané
Succeeded by	Ed Lumley
Minister of Industry, Trade and Commerce
In office March 3, 1980 – September 29, 1982
Prime Minister	Pierre Trudeau
Preceded by	Robert René de Cotret
Succeeded by	Ed Lumley
Minister of Consumer and Corporate Affairs
In office November 27, 1972 – August 7, 1974
Prime Minister	Pierre Trudeau
Preceded by	Bob Andras
Succeeded by	André Ouellet
Minister of National Revenue
In office September 24, 1970 – November 26, 1972
Prime Minister	Pierre Trudeau
Preceded by	Joseph Julien Jean-Pierre Côté
Succeeded by	Robert Stanbury

Member of Parliament for Windsor West (Essex West; 1962–1968)
- In office June 18, 1962 – January 15, 2002
- Preceded by: Norman Spencer
- Succeeded by: Brian Masse

Personal details
- Born: Herbert Eser Gray; May 25, 1931 Windsor, Ontario, Canada
- Died: April 21, 2014 (aged 82) Ottawa, Ontario, Canada
- Party: Liberal
- Spouse: Sharon Sholzberg (m. 1967)
- Children: 2
- Education: McGill University; Osgoode Hall Law School
- Profession: Lawyer

Herbert Eser Gray (May 25, 1931 – April 21, 2014) was a Canadian lawyer who became a prominent federal politician. He was a Liberal member of parliament for the Windsor area over the course of four decades, from 1962 to 2002, making Gray one of the longest-serving members in Canadian history. He was a cabinet minister under three prime ministers and was the seventh deputy prime minister of Canada from 1997 to 2002. Gray was Canada's first Jewish federal cabinet minister, and he is one of the few Canadians granted the honorific The Right Honourable who was not so entitled by virtue of a position held.

== Early life and education ==
Gray was born in Windsor, Ontario, the son of Fannie (née Lifitz), a nurse, and Harry Gray, who had a business selling yard goods. His parents were both from Belarusian Jewish families. Gray attended Victoria School and Kennedy Collegiate Institute in Windsor before receiving a Bachelor of Commerce degree in 1952 from McGill University. He studied at Osgoode Hall Law School, where he received a Bachelor of Laws degree and was called to the bar, becoming a member of the Law Society of Upper Canada.

On July 23, 1967, Gray married Sharon Sholzberg, also a lawyer. They had two children together – Jonathan David and Elizabeth Anne.

== Politics ==
Gray was first elected to Parliament for the riding of Essex West on June 18, 1962, as a member of the Liberal Party of Canada. He was re-elected in twelve subsequent federal elections, making him the longest continuously-serving Member of Parliament in Canadian history.

Gray served in a variety of roles during his parliamentary career, including cabinet ministries and committee chairmanships during the Liberal governments of Lester Pearson and Pierre Trudeau, and as opposition House leader from 1984 to 1990.

From February 6, 1990, to December 21, 1990, he was Leader of the Opposition, during John Turner's last four months as Liberal leader and the first few months of Jean Chrétien's leadership, until the latter won a by-election to Parliament. Gray's tenure as Leader of the Opposition saw the failure of the Meech Lake Accord, with Gray publicly laying the blame for its failure on Prime Minister Brian Mulroney in a televised address the day after its failure.

When the Liberals returned to power after the 1993 election, Gray was appointed Leader of the Government in the House of Commons and Solicitor General of Canada. On June 11, 1997, he was appointed Deputy Prime Minister of Canada.

Gray also retained an interest in provincial politics in the Windsor area. In 1996, he was named as honorary co-chair of Dwight Duncan's bid to the lead the provincial Liberal Party. Duncan had previously worked in Gray's office.

== Retirement and death ==
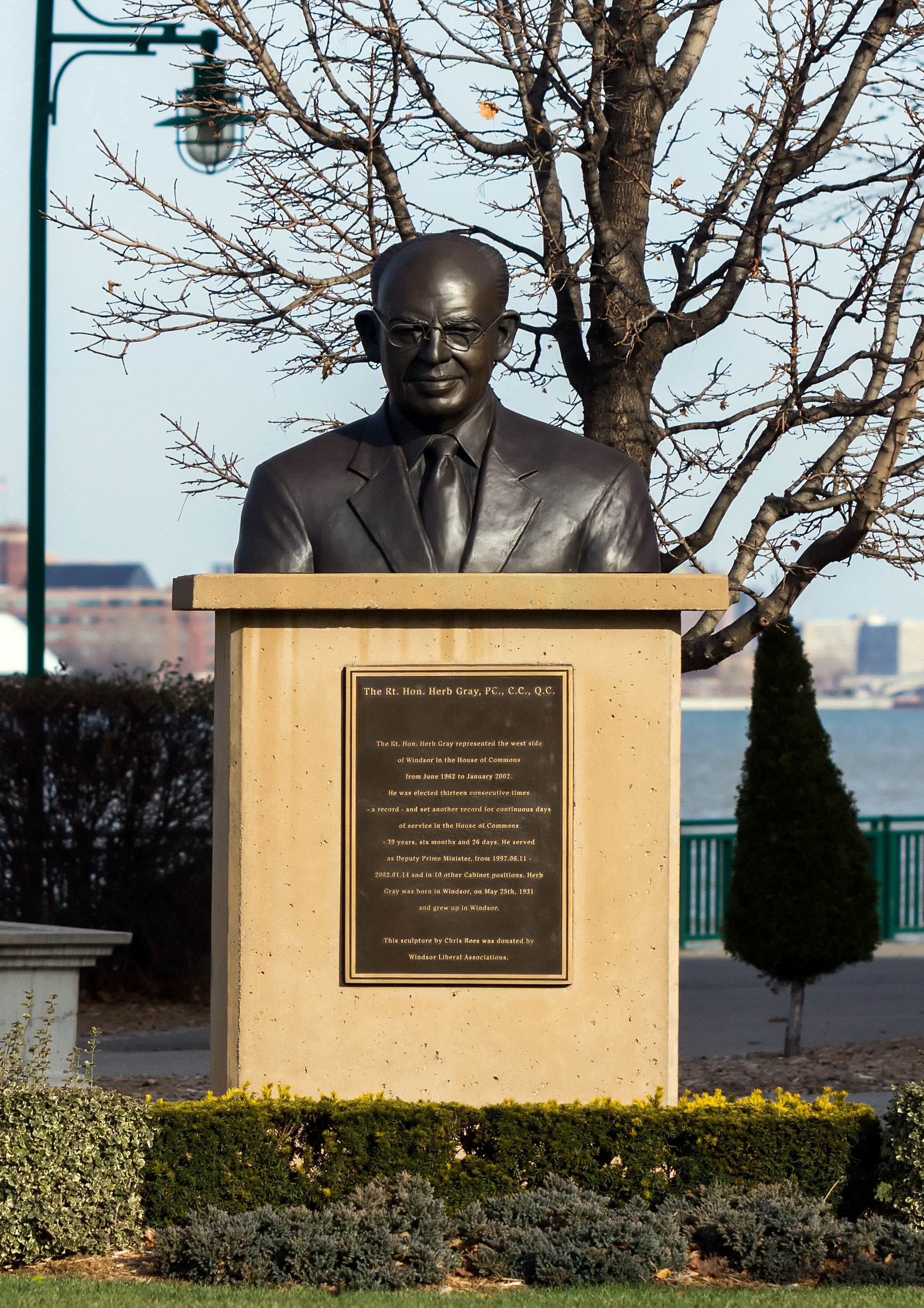
Bronze bust by sculptor Christopher Rees in Windsor, Ontario

Gray retired from Parliament on January 14, 2002, and was appointed Canadian Chair of the International Joint Commission, a bilateral organization which deals with Canada-United States trans-boundary issues on water and air rights.

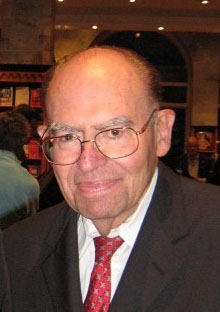
Gray in 2008

On November 28, 2008, Carleton University announced that Gray had been appointed as the university's 10th chancellor. He died in hospital in Ottawa on April 21, 2014, aged 82.

== Honours ==
On January 15, 2002, then-Governor General of Canada Adrienne Clarkson granted Gray the style "The Right Honourable", in honour of his distinguished and record-setting contribution to Canadian political life. In 2003, he was made a Companion of the Order of Canada, a designation which can be bestowed on only 165 outstanding Canadians at any given time, in recognition of being "an enduring force in Canadian politics". He was a recipient of the Canadian Centennial Medal, the Queen Elizabeth II Silver Jubilee Medal, the 125th Anniversary of the Confederation of Canada Medal, Queen Elizabeth II Golden Jubilee Medal and the Queen Elizabeth II Diamond Jubilee Medal. He received honorary degrees from the University of Windsor, Assumption University (Windsor), Catholic University of Lublin (Poland), McGill University, and the University of Ottawa, and Honorary Lifetime Membership as Governor #71 with Junior Chamber International Canada (JCI Canada). In 2009, he became an honorary brother of Alpha Epsilon Pi.

The extension of Highway 401 in Windsor (originally the Windsor-Essex Parkway) was renamed the Right Honourable Herb Gray Parkway on November 28, 2012.

== Personal life ==
Gray was diagnosed with esophageal cancer in 1996 and recovered after radiation therapy. In 1999, he had an operation to treat a prostate condition unrelated to the cancer. In August 2001, Gray underwent valve replacement surgery to correct a heart condition he had known about for years.

== Electoral record ==
=== Essex West ===
1962 Canadian federal election
Party	Candidate	Votes	%	±%
Liberal	Herb Gray	18,152	45.55	+11.25
Progressive Conservative	Norman L. Spencer	11,018	27.65	−18.10
New Democratic	Bill Tepperman	9,771	24.52	+5.43
Social Credit	Ray Gagnier	649	1.63	+0.77
Co-operative Builders	Edgar-Bernard Charron	261	0.65	
Total valid votes		39,851	100.00	

1963 Canadian federal election
Party	Candidate	Votes	%	±%
Liberal	Herb Gray	23,165	56.14	+10.59
Progressive Conservative	Tom Brophey	10,946	26.53	−1.12
New Democratic	Trevor Price	6,267	15.19	−9.33
Social Credit	Ray Gagnier	884	2.14	+0.51
Total valid votes		41,262	100.00	

1965 Canadian federal election
Party	Candidate	Votes	%	±%
Liberal	Herb Gray	21,525	56.12	−0.02
Progressive Conservative	Austin Dixon	10,298	26.85	+0.22
New Democratic	Hugh Peacock	5,739	14.96	−0.23
Independent	Don Armstrong	413	1.08	
Social Credit	Jack Backer	379	0.99	−1.15
Total valid votes		38,354	100.00	

=== Windsor West ===
1968 Canadian federal election
Party	Candidate	Votes	%	±%
Liberal	Herb Gray	16,442	54.06	
New Democratic	Stuart Ross	8,972	29.50	
Progressive Conservative	William J. Waldron	5,002	16.45	
Total valid votes		30,416	100.00	

1972 Canadian federal election
Party	Candidate	Votes	%	±%
Liberal	Herb Gray	17,966	49.20	−4.86
New Democratic	Paul Forder	13,110	35.90	+6.40
Progressive Conservative	John Gunning	5,441	14.90	−1.55
Total valid votes		36,517	100.00	

1974 Canadian federal election
Party	Candidate	Votes	%	±%
Liberal	Herb Gray	19,474	55.97	+6.77
New Democratic	Ron Seale	10,630	30.55	−5.35
Progressive Conservative	Bill McKay	4,466	12.84	−2.06
Marxist–Leninist	Ray Greig	222	0.64	
Total valid votes		34,792	100.00	

1979 Canadian federal election
Party	Candidate	Votes	%	±%
Liberal	Herb Gray	16,943	48.56	−7.41
New Democratic	Maxine Jones	11,906	34.12	+3.57
Progressive Conservative	Bob Krause	5,869	16.82	+3.98
Communist	Gerard O'Neill	102	0.29	
Marxist–Leninist	M. Villamizar	74	0.21	−0.43
Total valid votes		34,894	100.00	

1980 Canadian federal election
Party	Candidate	Votes	%	±%
Liberal	Herb Gray	19,755	58.50	+9.94
New Democratic	Maxine Jones	9,785	28.98	−4.14
Progressive Conservative	Ned Griffith	4,107	12.16	−4.66
Communist	Gerard O'Neill	72	0.21	
Marxist–Leninist	Margaret Villamizar	49	0.15	−0.06
Total valid votes		33,768	100.00	

1984 Canadian federal election
Party	Candidate	Votes	%	±%
Liberal	Herb Gray	13,624	40.55	−17.95
New Democratic	Paul Forder	11,503	34.23	+5.25
Progressive Conservative	Marty Goldberg	8,158	24.28	+12.12
Rhinoceros	Martin X. Deck	232	0.69	
Communist	Mike Longmoore	84	0.25	+0.04
Total valid votes		33,601	100.00	

1988 Canadian federal election
Party	Candidate	Votes	%	±%
Liberal	Herb Gray	23,796	56.24	+15.69
New Democratic	Paul Forder	12,143	27.80	−6.43
Progressive Conservative	Bert Silcox	6,131	14.49	−9.79
Independent	Robert Cruise	127	0.30	
Communist	Maggie Bizzell	112	0.26	
Total valid votes		42,309	100.00	

1993 Canadian federal election
Party	Candidate	Votes	%	±%
Liberal	Herb Gray	27,008	73.00	+16.76
Reform	Brett Skinner	4,179	11.30	
New Democratic	Emily Carasco	3,359	9.08	−18.72
Progressive Conservative	Dan Friesen	1,663	4.49	−10.00
Green	Sarah Atkinson	395	1.07	
Natural Law	Larry Decter	138	0.37	
Independent	Bill Steptoe	128	0.35	
Marxist–Leninist	Robert Cruise	93	0.25	−0.05
Abolitionist	Rose Pope	35	0.09	
Total valid votes		36,998	100.00	

1997 Canadian federal election
Party	Candidate	Votes	%	±%
Liberal	Herb Gray	21,877	55.20	−17.80
New Democratic	Tom Milne	9,411	23.74	+14.66
Reform	Jeff Watson	5,295	13.36	+2.06
Progressive Conservative	Dan Friesen	2,452	6.19	+1.70
Green	Richard Warman	398	1.00	−0.07
Marxist–Leninist	Robert Cruise	199	0.50	+0.25
Total valid votes		39,632	100.00	

2000 Canadian federal election
Party	Candidate	Votes	%	±%
Liberal	Herb Gray	20,729	54.21	−0.99
Alliance	Jeff Watson	8,777	22.95	+9.59
New Democratic	John McGinlay	6,080	15.90	−7.84
Progressive Conservative	Ian West	2,116	5.53	−0.66
Independent	Christopher Soda	304	0.80	
Marxist–Leninist	Enver Villamizar	229	0.60	+0.10
Total valid votes		38,235	100.00	

Note: Canadian Alliance vote is compared to the Reform vote in 1997 election.

== Archives ==
There is a Herb Gray fonds at Library and Archives Canada.

26th Canadian Ministry (1993–2003) – Cabinet of Jean Chrétien
Cabinet posts (2)
Predecessor	Office	Successor
Sheila Copps	Deputy Prime Minister of Canada; 1997–2002	John Manley
Doug Lewis	Solicitor General of Canada; 1993–1997	Andy Scott
Special Cabinet Responsibilities
Predecessor	Title	Successor
	Minister responsible for the Millennium Bureau of Canada; 1998–2002	
Special Parliamentary Responsibilities
Predecessor	Title	Successor
Doug Lewis	Leader of the Government in the House of Commons; 1993–1997	Don Boudria
23rd Canadian Ministry (1984) – Cabinet of John Turner
Cabinet post (1)
Predecessor	Office	Successor
cont'd from 22nd Min.	President of the Treasury Board; 1984	Robert de Cotret
22nd Canadian Ministry (1980–1984) – Second cabinet of Pierre Trudeau
Cabinet posts (3)
Predecessor	Office	Successor
Don Johnston	President of the Treasury Board; 1982–1984	cont'd into 23rd Min.
Pierre de Bané	Minister of Regional Economic Expansion; 1982	Ed Lumley
Robert de Cotret	Minister of Industry, Trade and Commerce; 1980–1982	Ed Lumley
20th Canadian Ministry (1968–1979) – First cabinet of Pierre Trudeau
Cabinet posts (3)
Predecessor	Office	Successor
Bob Andras	Minister of Consumer and Corporate Affairs; 1972–1974	André Ouellet
Jean-Pierre Côté	Minister of National Revenue; 1970–1972	Robert Stanbury
	Minister without Portfolio; 1969–1970	
Party political offices
Preceded by	Deputy Leader of the Liberal Party of Canada; 1989–1990	Succeeded by Sheila Copps
Academic offices
Preceded by Marc Garneau	Chancellor of Carleton University; 2008–2011	Succeeded by Charles Chi
