= Security Bank (New Auburn, Wisconsin) =

- Type: Private Company
- Industry: Personal Banking & Lending
- Founded: New Auburn, Wisconsin (1907)
- Headquarters: New Auburn, Wisconsin
- Key people: Karen Smith (Vice President) & Inez North (Vice President)
- Products: Financial services
- Operating income: US $62,757,000 (March, 2009) 4.66% ▲ from $60,077,000 (March, 2008)
- Total assets: US $75,658,000 (March, 2009) 4.77% ▼ from $79,444,000 (March, 2008)
- Number of employees: <50
- Parent: Security Bank Shares
- Website: www.securityonlinebank.com

Security Bank is a U.S. financial services institution headquartered in New Auburn, Wisconsin.

== History ==
Founded in 1907, Security Bank is a full-service community bank that is one of the oldest banks in Chippewa County, Wisconsin. Security Bank provides bank branch offices at five Wisconsin locations: New Auburn, Bloomer Sand Creek, Ridgeland and Dallas.

As of March 2009, the bank reported US$75,658,000 in assets.

== FDIC Charter Information ==
Security Bank has been FDIC insured since January 1, 1934 with certificate #10015. Federal Reserve ID# 20053
