= Michael Perry (author) =

American author

- Born: December 16, 1964 (age 61); New Auburn, Wisconsin, U.S.
- Education: University of Wisconsin–Eau Claire
- Occupation: Author

Michael Perry (born December 16, 1964) is an American author, born and raised in New Auburn, Wisconsin.

== Biography ==
After spending his childhood on a small Midwestern dairy farm, Perry put himself through nursing school while working on a ranch in Wyoming, and subsequently worked as a nurse and an emergency medical technician. He lives with his wife and two daughters in rural Wisconsin; in addition to writing, Perry maintains a farm, raising chickens and formerly pigs. Perry hosts the nationally syndicated Tent Show Radio, performs as a humorist, and tours with his band, the Long Beds. His memoirs include Population 485, Truck: A Love Story, Coop, and Visiting Tom. His book exploring the work of the French philosopher and essayist Michel de Montaigne, Montaigne in Barn Boots, was published in 2017. He had developed an interest in Montaigne's work while recuperating from a kidney stone, when he did research into his condition and saw references to Montaigne, who also suffered from that malady.

Perry’s essays and nonfiction have appeared in The New York Times Magazine, Esquire, Backpacker, Outside and Runner’s World. He has collaborated with the musician Justin Vernon on several projects, including composing the liner notes for the Vernon-produced The Blind Boys of Alabama album I'll Find a Way and serving as narrator for the Eaux Claires music festival.

Perry has been the subject of three PBS Wisconsin specials: Michael Perry: How Ya Doin' (2019), Michael Perry: Where I Come From (2019), and Michael Perry: On the Road (2023).

Perry was educated at the University of Wisconsin–Eau Claire.

== Works ==
- Why They Killed Big Boy: And Other Stories (1996)
- Big Rigs, Elvis & the Grand Dragon Wayne (1999) (15 of the 20 essays were later republished in Off Main Street)
- Population: 485: Meeting Your Neighbors One Siren at a Time (HarperCollins, 2002)
- Off Main Street: Brainstormers, Prophets, and Gatemouth's Gator (HarperCollins, 2005)
- Truck: A Love Story (HarperCollins, 2006)
- Coop: A Year of Poultry, Pigs, and Parenting (HarperCollins, 2009)
- Visiting Tom: A Man, a Highway, and the Road to Roughneck Grace (HarperCollins, 2012)
- From the Top: Brief Transmissions from Tent Show Radio (Wisconsin Historical Society Press, 2013)
- The Scavengers (HarperCollins, 2014)
- The Jesus Cow (HarperCollins, 2015)
- Roughneck Grace: Farmer Yoga, Creeping Codgerism, Apple Golf, and Other Brief Essays from On and Off the Back Forty (Wisconsin Historical Society Press, 2016)
- Montaigne in Barn Boots: An Amateur Ambles Through Philosophy (HarperCollins, 2017)
- Danger, Man Working: Writing from the Heart, the Gut, and the Poison Ivy Patch (Wisconsin Historical Society Press, 2017)
- Big Boy’s Big Rig: The Leftovers (Sneezing Cow Publishing, 2020)
- Million Billion: Brief Essays on Snow Days, Spitwads, Bad Sandwiches, Dad Socks, Hairballs, Headbanging Bird Love, and Hope. (Sneezing Cow, Inc., 2020)
- Peaceful Persistence (Sneezing Cow Publishing, 2020)
- Hunker: Brief Essays on Human Connection (Sneezing Cow Publishing, 2022)
- Forty Acres Deep (Sneezing Cow Publishing, 2023)

== Discography ==
- Headwinded – Michael Perry and the Long Beds (2006)
- Tiny Pilot – Michael Perry and the Long Beds (2010)
- Bootlegged at the Big Top – Michael Perry and the Long Beds (2014)
- Long Road To You – Michael Perry and the Long Beds (2019)

== Recordings (Humor) ==
- Never Stand Behind A Sneezing Cow (1996)
- I Got It From The Cows (2001)
- Clodhopper Monologues (2011)
