= Windsor West (federal electoral district) =

Federal electoral district in Ontario, Canada

Coordinates: 42.29°N 83.05°W

Ontario electoral district
- Interactive map of riding boundaries from the 2025 federal election

Federal electoral district
- Legislature: House of Commons
MP
Harb Gill
Conservative
- District created: 1966
- First contested: 1968
- Last contested: 2025
- District webpage: profile, map

Demographics
- Population (2016): 122,988
- Electors (2015): 84,700
- Area (km²): 83
- Pop. density (per km²): 1,481.8
- Census division: Essex
- Census subdivision: Windsor (part)

Windsor West (French: Windsor-Ouest) is a federal electoral district in Ontario, Canada, that has been represented in the House of Commons of Canada since 1968.

== Geography ==
Ontario 2018 Windsor West.

The district consists of the part of the city of Windsor lying west and south of a line drawn from the United States border southeast of the city of Detroit along Langlois Avenue, east along Tecumseh Road East, and southeast along Pillette Road to the southern city limit.

== Demographics ==
According to the 2021 Canadian census

Ethnic groups: 54.9% White, 12.1% Arab, 10.0% South Asian, 6.2% Black, 4.4% Chinese, 3.7% Indigenous, 2.3% Southeast Asian, 1.6% West Asian, 1.5% Latin American, 1.4% Filipino

Languages: 60.3% English, 8.4% Arabic, 2.4% Mandarin, 2.1% Italian, 1.7% Urdu, 1.6% Punjabi, 1.5% French, 1.2% Chaldean, 1.2% Spanish, 1.1% Gujarati, 1.0% Vietnamese, 1.0% Cantonese

Religion: 50.0% Christian (29.3% Catholic, 2.7% Anglican, 2.6% Christian Orthodox, 1.6% United Church, 1.3% Pentecostal, 1.3% Baptist, 11.2% Other), 16.0% Muslim, 3.8% Hindu, 1.6% Sikh, 1.3% Buddhist, 26.4% None

Median income: $34,000 (2020)

Average income: $44,080 (2020)

== History ==
Windsor West riding was created in 1966 from parts of Essex East and Essex West ridings.

It consisted initially of the part of the City of Windsor and the Township of Sandwich West bounded on the west by the United States border of the city of Detroit, and on the north, east and west by a line drawn from the border east along County Road 28, north along Malden Road, east along Malden Road South, south along Huron Church Line Road, east along Cabana Road, north along Howard Avenue, west along the C.P.R. line, northwest along McDougall Avenue, east along Tecumseh Boulevard East, north along Elsmere Avenue, west along Elliott Street East, and north along Marentette Avenue to the border.

In 1976, it was redefined to consist of the part of the City of Windsor bounded on the west by the U.S. border, and on the north, east and west by a line drawn from the border south along Langlois Avenue, west along Tecumseh Boulevard East, south along McDougall Street, east along the Canadian Pacific Railway, south along Howard Avenue, and west along Cabana Road to the southwest city limit.

In 1987, it was redefined to consist of the part of the City of Windsor lying south and west of a line drawn from the U.S. border south along Langlois Avenue, west along Tecumseh Road East, south along McDougall Street, east along to the Canadian Pacific Railway line, and south along the Chesapeake and Ohio Railway line to the southern city limit.

In 1996, it was redefined to consist of the part of the City of Windsor lying south and west of a line drawn from the U.S. border south along Langlois Avenue, west along Tecumseh Road East, and south along Pillette Road to the southern city limit. In 2004, The boundaries were not changed for this riding.

This riding was left unchanged after the 2012 electoral redistribution.

== Members of Parliament ==
This riding has elected the following members of Parliament:

| Parliament | Years | Member | Party |
|---|---|---|---|
Windsor West; Riding created from Essex East and Essex West
| 28th | 1968–1972 | Herb Gray | Liberal |
| 29th | 1972–1974 | Herb Gray | Liberal |
| 30th | 1974–1979 | Herb Gray | Liberal |
| 31st | 1979–1980 | Herb Gray | Liberal |
| 32nd | 1980–1984 | Herb Gray | Liberal |
| 33rd | 1984–1988 | Herb Gray | Liberal |
| 34th | 1988–1993 | Herb Gray | Liberal |
| 35th | 1993–1997 | Herb Gray | Liberal |
| 36th | 1997–2000 | Herb Gray | Liberal |
| 37th | 2000–2002 | Herb Gray | Liberal |
| 37th | 2002–2004 | Brian Masse | New Democratic |
| 38th | 2004–2006 | Brian Masse | New Democratic |
| 39th | 2006–2008 | Brian Masse | New Democratic |
| 40th | 2008–2011 | Brian Masse | New Democratic |
| 41st | 2011–2015 | Brian Masse | New Democratic |
| 42nd | 2015–2019 | Brian Masse | New Democratic |
| 43rd | 2019–2021 | Brian Masse | New Democratic |
| 44th | 2021–2025 | Brian Masse | New Democratic |
| 45th | 2025–present | Harb Gill | Conservative |

== Election results ==
Graph of election results in Windsor West (parties that never got 2% of the vote are omitted) View source data.

2025 Canadian federal election
| Party | Candidate | Votes | % | ±% | Expenditures |
|---|---|---|---|---|---|
| Conservative | Harb Gill | 21,412 | 39.01 | +19.67 | |
| Liberal | Richard Pollock | 16,986 | 30.95 | +3.18 | |
| New Democratic | Brian Masse | 15,256 | 27.79 | −16.45 | |
| People's | Jacob Bezaire | 553 | 1.01 | −7.33 | |
| Green | Louay Ahmad | 397 | 0.72 | N/A | |
| Communist | Joseph Markham | 195 | 0.36 | N/A | |
| Marxist–Leninist | Margaret Villamizar | 89 | 0.16 | −0.15 | |
| Total valid votes/expense limit | | 54,888 | 99.19 | | |
| Total rejected ballots | | 446 | 0.81 | | |
| Turnout | | 55,334 | 58.60 | | |
| Eligible voters | | 94,427 | | | |
| Conservative notional gain from New Democratic | | Swing | | +8.25 | |
Source: Elections Canada
Note: number of eligible voters does not include voting day registrations.

2021 Canadian federal election
| Party | Candidate | Votes | % | ±% | Expenditures |
|---|---|---|---|---|---|
| New Democratic | Brian Masse | 21,702 | 44.1 | +4.0 | $88,457.01 |
| Liberal | Sandra Pupatello | 13,670 | 27.9 | -8.4 | $86,067.85 |
| Conservative | Anthony Orlando | 9,436 | 19.1 | — | none listed |
| People's | Matthew Giancola | 4,080 | 8.0 | +6.2 | $5,606.67 |
| Marxist–Leninist | Margaret Villamizar | 156 | 0.1 | +0.08 | $0.00 |
| Total valid votes/expense limit | | 48,693 | 99.0 | – | $120,365.34 |
| Total rejected ballots | | 504 | 1.0 | | |
| Turnout | | 49,197 | 53.4 | | |
| Eligible voters | | 92,207 | | | |
| New Democratic hold | | Swing | | +6.2 | |
Source: Elections Canada

2021 federal election redistributed results
| Party | Vote | % |
|---|---|---|
| New Democratic | 21,541 | 44.24 |
| Liberal | 13,524 | 27.77 |
| Conservative | 9,415 | 19.34 |
| People's | 4,060 | 8.34 |
| Others | 153 | 0.31 |

2019 Canadian federal election
| Party | Candidate | Votes | % | ±% | Expenditures |
|---|---|---|---|---|---|
| New Democratic | Brian Masse | 20,800 | 40.03 | -11.32 | $105,980.25 |
| Liberal | Sandra Pupatello | 18,878 | 36.33 | +11.08 | $107,376.65 |
| Conservative | Henry Lau | 9,925 | 19.10 | -1.65 | – |
| Green | Quinn Hunt | 1,325 | 2.55 | +0.24 | – |
| People's | Darryl Burrel | 958 | 1.84 | – | – |
| Marxist–Leninist | Margaret Villamizar | 76 | 0.15 | -0.20 | – |
| Total valid votes/expense limit | | 51,962 | 98.93 | | |
| Total rejected ballots | | 560 | 1.07 | +0.46 | |
| Turnout | | 52,522 | 55.32 | +0.55 | |
| Eligible voters | | 94,944 | | | |
| New Democratic hold | | Swing | | -11.20 | |
Source: Elections Canada

2015 Canadian federal election
| Party | Candidate | Votes | % | ±% | Expenditures |
|---|---|---|---|---|---|
| New Democratic | Brian Masse | 24,085 | 51.35 | -2.98 | $80,089.86 |
| Liberal | Dave Sundin | 11,842 | 25.25 | +14.36 | $29,218.35 |
| Conservative | Henry Lau | 9,734 | 20.75 | -10.89 | $16,790.47 |
| Green | Cora LaRussa | 1,083 | 2.31 | -0.45 | – |
| Marxist–Leninist | Margaret Villamizar | 161 | 0.34 | -0.04 | – |
| Total valid votes/Expense limit | | 46,905 | 99.40 | | $222,985.73 |
| Total rejected ballots | | 284 | 0.60 | – | |
| Turnout | | 47,189 | 54.77 | – | |
| Eligible voters | | 86,166 | | | |
Source: Elections Canada
| New Democratic Party hold | | | | | |

2011 Canadian federal election
| Party | Candidate | Votes | % | ±% | Expenditures |
|---|---|---|---|---|---|
| New Democratic | Brian Masse | 21,592 | 54.33 | +1.79 | – |
| Conservative | Lisa Lumley | 12,577 | 31.64 | +9.06 | – |
| Liberal | Melanie Deveau | 4,327 | 10.89 | -7.70 | – |
| Green | Alishia Fox | 1,096 | 2.76 | -2.92 | – |
| Marxist–Leninist | Margaret Villamizar | 153 | 0.38 | +0.09 | – |
| Total valid votes | | 39,745 | 100.00 | – | |
| Total rejected ballots | | 257 | 0.64 | -0.06 | |
| Turnout | | 40,002 | 49.13 | +1.80 | |
| Eligible voters | | 81,428 | – | – | |
| New Democratic Party hold | | | | | |

2008 Canadian federal election
| Party | Candidate | Votes | % | ±% | Expenditures |
|---|---|---|---|---|---|
| New Democratic | Brian Masse | 20,834 | 52.54 | +3.05 | $74,929 |
| Conservative | Lisa Lumley | 8,953 | 22.58 | +2.47 | $60,613 |
| Liberal | Larry Horwitz | 7,369 | 18.59 | -6.80 | $53,753 |
| Green | John Esposito | 2,253 | 5.68 | +2.65 | $132 |
| Communist | Elizabeth Rowley | 125 | 0.32 | – | $373 |
| Marxist–Leninist | Margaret Villamizar | 116 | 0.29 | +0.06 | |
| Total valid votes/Expense limit | | 39,650 | 100.00 | $88,186 | |
| Total rejected ballots | | 281 | 0.70 | 0.01 | |
| Turnout | | 39,877 | 47.33 | -9.96 | |
| New Democratic Party hold | | Swing | +0.29 | | |

2006 Canadian federal election
| Party | Candidate | Votes | % | ±% | Expenditures |
|---|---|---|---|---|---|
| New Democratic | Brian Masse | 23,608 | 49.49 | +3.52 | $76,342 |
| Liberal | Werner Keller | 12,110 | 25.39 | −5.93 | $55,858 |
| Conservative | Al Teshuba | 9,592 | 20.11 | +1.20 | $77,898 |
| Green | Jillana Bishop | 1,444 | 3.03 | −0.47 | $2,450 |
| Progressive Canadian | Chris Schnurr | 614 | 1.29 | – | $731 |
| Independent | Habib Zaidi | 224 | 0.47 | – | $3,631 |
| Marxist–Leninist | Enver Villamizar | 108 | 0.23 | −0.07 | |
| Total valid votes | | 47,700 | 99.31 | | |
| Total rejected ballots | | 329 | 0.69 | +0.08 | |
| Turnout | | 48,029 | 57.29 | +3.20 | |
| Electors on the lists | | 83,839 | | | |
Sources: Official Results, Elections Canada and Financial Returns, Elections Canada.

2004 Canadian federal election
| Party | Candidate | Votes | % | ±% | Expenditures |
|---|---|---|---|---|---|
| New Democratic | Brian Masse | 20,297 | 45.97 | +30.01 | $77,487 |
| Liberal | Richard Pollock | 13,831 | 31.32 | −22.80 | $74,197 |
| Conservative | Jordan Katz | 8,348 | 18.91 | −9.63 | $69,771 |
| Green | Rob Spring | 1,545 | 3.50 | | $4,721 |
| Marxist–Leninist | Enver Villamizar | 134 | 0.30 | | $300 |
| Total valid votes | | 44,155 | 99.39 | | |
| Total rejected ballots | | 273 | 0.61 | 0.00 | |
| Turnout | | 44,428 | 54.09 | +11.08 | |
| Electors on the lists | | 82,143 | | | |
Percentage change figures are factored for redistribution. Conservative Party percentages are contrasted with the combined Canadian Alliance and Progressive Conservative percentages from 2000.
Sources: Official Results, Elections Canada and Financial Returns, Elections Canada.

Note: Conservative vote is compared to the total of the Canadian Alliance vote and Progressive Conservative vote in 2000 election.

Canadian federal by-election, May 13, 2002
| Party | Candidate | Votes | % | ±% | Expenditures |
|---|---|---|---|---|---|
| New Democratic | Brian Masse | 14,021 | 42.69 | +26.79 | $65,195 |
| Liberal | Richard Pollock | 11,544 | 35.15 | −19.06 | $64,964 |
| Alliance | Rick Fuschi | 5,420 | 16.50 | −6.45 | $60,657 |
| Progressive Conservative | Ian West | 957 | 2.91 | −2.62 | $11,212 |
| Green | Chris Holt | 655 | 1.99 | – | $9,246 |
| Christian Heritage | Allan James | 249 | 0.76 | – | $2,072 |
| Total valid votes | | 32,846 | 99.39 | | |
| Total rejected ballots | | 200 | 0.61 | | |
| Turnout | | 33,046 | 43.01 | | |
| Electors on the lists | | 76,825 | | | |
| New Democratic Party gain from Liberal | | | | | |

2000 Canadian federal election: Windsor West
| Party | Candidate | Votes | % | ±% |
|---|---|---|---|---|
| Liberal | Herb Gray | 20,729 | 54.21 | -0.99 |
| Alliance | Jeff Watson | 8,777 | 22.95 | +9.59 |
| New Democratic | John McGinlay | 6,080 | 15.90 | -7.84 |
| Progressive Conservative | Ian West | 2,116 | 5.53 | -0.66 |
| Independent | Christopher Soda | 304 | 0.80 | |
| Marxist–Leninist | Enver Villamizar | 229 | 0.60 | +0.10 |
| Total valid votes | | 38,235 | 100.00 | |

Note: Canadian Alliance vote is compared to the Reform vote in 1997 election.

1997 Canadian federal election: Windsor West
| Party | Candidate | Votes | % | ±% |
|---|---|---|---|---|
| Liberal | Herb Gray | 21,877 | 55.20 | -17.80 |
| New Democratic | Tom Milne | 9,411 | 23.74 | +14.66 |
| Reform | Jeff Watson | 5,295 | 13.36 | +2.06 |
| Progressive Conservative | Dan Friesen | 2,452 | 6.19 | +1.70 |
| Green | Richard Warman | 398 | 1.00 | -0.07 |
| Marxist–Leninist | Robert Cruise | 199 | 0.50 | +0.25 |
| Total valid votes | | 39,632 | 100.00 | |

1993 Canadian federal election
| Party | Candidate | Votes | % | ±% |
|---|---|---|---|---|
| Liberal | Herb Gray | 27,008 | 73.00 | +16.76 |
| Reform | Brett Skinner | 4,179 | 11.30 | |
| New Democratic | Emily Carasco | 3,359 | 9.08 | -18.72 |
| Progressive Conservative | Dan Friesen | 1,663 | 4.49 | -10.00 |
| Green | Sarah Atkinson | 395 | 1.07 | |
| Natural Law | Larry Decter | 138 | 0.37 | |
| Independent | Bill Steptoe | 128 | 0.35 | |
| Marxist–Leninist | Robert Cruise | 93 | 0.25 | -0.05 |
| Abolitionist | Rose Pope | 35 | 0.09 | |
| Total valid votes | | 36,998 | 100.00 | |

1988 Canadian federal election
| Party | Candidate | Votes | % | ±% |
|---|---|---|---|---|
| Liberal | Herb Gray | 23,796 | 56.24 | +15.69 |
| New Democratic | Paul Forder | 12,143 | 27.80 | -6.43 |
| Progressive Conservative | Bert Silcox | 6,131 | 14.49 | -9.79 |
| Independent | Robert Cruise | 127 | 0.30 | |
| Communist | Maggie Bizzell | 112 | 0.26 | |
| Total valid votes | | 42,309 | 100.00 | |

1984 Canadian federal election
| Party | Candidate | Votes | % | ±% |
|---|---|---|---|---|
| Liberal | Herb Gray | 13,624 | 40.55 | -17.95 |
| New Democratic | Paul Forder | 11,503 | 34.23 | +5.25 |
| Progressive Conservative | Marty Goldberg | 8,158 | 24.28 | +12.12 |
| Rhinoceros | Martin X. Deck | 232 | 0.69 | |
| Communist | Mike Longmoore | 84 | 0.25 | +0.04 |
| Total valid votes | | 33,601 | 100.00 | |

1980 Canadian federal election
| Party | Candidate | Votes | % | ±% |
|---|---|---|---|---|
| Liberal | Herb Gray | 19,755 | 58.50 | +9.94 |
| New Democratic | Maxine Jones | 9,785 | 28.98 | -4.14 |
| Progressive Conservative | Ned Griffith | 4,107 | 12.16 | -4.66 |
| Communist | Gerard O'Neill | 72 | 0.21 | |
| Marxist–Leninist | Margaret Villamizar | 49 | 0.15 | -0.06 |
| Total valid votes | | 33,768 | 100.00 | |

1979 Canadian federal election
| Party | Candidate | Votes | % | ±% |
|---|---|---|---|---|
| Liberal | Herb Gray | 16,943 | 48.56 | -7.41 |
| New Democratic | Maxine Jones | 11,906 | 34.12 | +3.57 |
| Progressive Conservative | Bob Krause | 5,869 | 16.82 | +3.98 |
| Communist | Gerard O'Neill | 102 | 0.29 | |
| Marxist–Leninist | M. Villamizar | 74 | 0.21 | -0.43 |
| Total valid votes | | 34,894 | 100.00 | |

1974 Canadian federal election
| Party | Candidate | Votes | % | ±% |
|---|---|---|---|---|
| Liberal | Herb Gray | 19,474 | 55.97 | +6.77 |
| New Democratic | Ron Seale | 10,630 | 30.55 | -5.35 |
| Progressive Conservative | Bill McKay | 4,466 | 12.84 | -2.06 |
| Marxist–Leninist | Ray Greig | 222 | 0.64 | |
| Total valid votes | | 34,792 | 100.00 | |

1972 Canadian federal election
| Party | Candidate | Votes | % | ±% |
|---|---|---|---|---|
| Liberal | Herb Gray | 17,966 | 49.20 | -4.86 |
| New Democratic | Paul Forder | 13,110 | 35.90 | +6.40 |
| Progressive Conservative | John Gunning | 5,441 | 14.90 | -1.55 |
| Total valid votes | | 36,517 | 100.00 | |

1968 Canadian federal election
| Party | Candidate | Votes | % |
|---|---|---|---|
| Liberal | Herb Gray | 16,442 | 54.06 |
| New Democratic | Stuart Ross | 8,972 | 29.50 |
| Progressive Conservative | William J. Waldron | 5,002 | 16.45 |
| Total valid votes | | 30,416 | 100.00 |

== See also ==
- List of Canadian electoral districts
- Historical federal electoral districts of Canada
