= Essex West (electoral district) =

Former federal electoral district in Ontario, Canada

Ontario electoral district

Defunct federal electoral district
- Legislature: House of Commons
- District created: 1924
- District abolished: 1966
- First contested: 1925
- Last contested: 1965

Essex West was a federal electoral district in the province of Ontario, Canada, that was represented in the House of Commons of Canada from 1925 to 1968. This riding was created in 1924 from parts of Essex North riding.

It was initially defined to consist of the city of Windsor, the town of Sandwich and the townships of East and West Sandwich in the county of Essex, including the towns of Ford City and Walkerville, or the villages of Riverside, Tecumseh and St. Clair Shores.

In 1933, it was redefined to consist of the township of Sandwich West in the county of Essex including the town of Sandwich and the part of the city of Windsor lying north of Tecumseh Road.

In 1947, it was redefined to exclude the part city of Windsor city lying south of Tecumseh Boulevard and east of the line dividing lots facing on Lincoln Road to the east and Gladstone Avenue to the west.

The electoral district was abolished in 1966 when it was redistributed between Essex, Windsor West and Windsor—Walkerville ridings.

== Members of Parliament ==
This riding elected the following members of the House of Commons of Canada:

Parliament	Years	Member	Party
Riding created from Essex North
15th	1925–1926	Sidney Cecil Robinson	Conservative
16th	1926–1930	Sidney Cecil Robinson	Conservative
17th	1930–1935	Sidney Cecil Robinson	Conservative
18th	1935–1940	Norman Alexander McLarty	Liberal
19th	1940–1945	Norman Alexander McLarty	Liberal
20th	1945–1949	Donald Ferguson Brown	Liberal
21st	1949–1953	Donald Ferguson Brown	Liberal
22nd	1953–1957	Donald Ferguson Brown	Liberal
23rd	1957–1958	Donald Ferguson Brown	Liberal
24th	1958–1962	Norman Spencer	Progressive Conservative
25th	1962–1963	Herb Gray	Liberal
26th	1963–1965	Herb Gray	Liberal
27th	1965–1968	Herb Gray	Liberal
Riding dissolved into Essex, Windsor West and Windsor—Walkerville

== Election results ==
1925 Canadian federal election
Party	Candidate	Votes
Conservative	Sidney Cecil Robinson	11,029
Liberal	Edward Blake Winter	8,508

1926 Canadian federal election
Party	Candidate	Votes
Conservative	Sidney Cecil Robinson	11,555
Liberal	John Henry Rodd	11,095

1930 Canadian federal election
Party	Candidate	Votes
Conservative	Sidney Cecil Robinson	17,150
Liberal	Glencora Kennedy	10,690

1935 Canadian federal election
Party	Candidate	Votes
Liberal	Norman Alexander McLarty	11,033
Conservative	Sidney Cecil Robinson	8,150
Co-operative Commonwealth	Olive Jane Whyte	5,241
Reconstruction	Garnet A. Edwards	1,837

1940 Canadian federal election
Party	Candidate	Votes
Liberal	Norman Alexander McLarty	14,133
National Government	Arthur John Reaume	12,940
Co-operative Commonwealth	Frederick Joseph Joyce	2,035

1945 Canadian federal election
Party	Candidate	Votes
Liberal	Donald Ferguson Brown	14,270
Progressive Conservative	James D. Leach	12,069
Co-operative Commonwealth	Frederick Arthur Burr	5,689

1949 Canadian federal election
Party	Candidate	Votes
Liberal	Donald Ferguson Brown	15,620
Progressive Conservative	Kenneth W. MacInture	12,958
Co-operative Commonwealth	Archie D. Cherniak	6,836

1953 Canadian federal election
Party	Candidate	Votes
Liberal	Donald Ferguson Brown	15,199
Progressive Conservative	Donald Morand	9,392
Co-operative Commonwealth	Les Batterson	3,198
Labor–Progressive	Cyril Prince	868

1957 Canadian federal election
Party	Candidate	Votes
Liberal	Donald Ferguson Brown	15,180
Progressive Conservative	Norman Spencer	11,256
Co-operative Commonwealth	Bert Weeks	7,736
Social Credit	Richard N. Webster	837

1958 Canadian federal election
Party	Candidate	Votes
Progressive Conservative	Norman Spencer	18,927
Liberal	Donald Ferguson Brown	14,190
Co-operative Commonwealth	Bert Weeks	7,898
Social Credit	Edgar B. Charron	355

1962 Canadian federal election
Party	Candidate	Votes
Liberal	Herb Gray	18,152
Progressive Conservative	Norman Spencer	11,018
New Democratic	Bill Tepperman	9,771
Social Credit	Ray Gagnier	649
Co-operative Builders	Edgar-Bernard Charron	261

1963 Canadian federal election
Party	Candidate	Votes
Liberal	Herb Gray	23,165
Progressive Conservative	Tom Brophey	10,946
New Democratic	Trevor Price	6,267
Social Credit	Ray Gagnier	884

1965 Canadian federal election
Party	Candidate	Votes
Liberal	Herb Gray	21,525
Progressive Conservative	Austin Dixon	10,298
New Democratic	Hugh Peacock	5,739
Independent	Don Armstrong	413
Social Credit	Jack Backer	379

== See also ==
- List of Canadian electoral districts
- Historical federal electoral districts of Canada
