= Fred W. Springer =

American politician

Fred W. Springer (1859-1936) was a member of the Wisconsin State Assembly.

== Biography ==
Springer was born in Frankfurt (Oder), Prussia, on January 4, 1859. He would attend the Spencerian Business College. Springer died in 1936.

== Career ==
Springer was elected to the Assembly in 1928. Previously, he was a member of the Milwaukee School Commission in 1893, 1896 and 1904. He was a Republican.
