= Robert Emmet Tehan =

American judge

The Honorable Robert Emmet Tehan
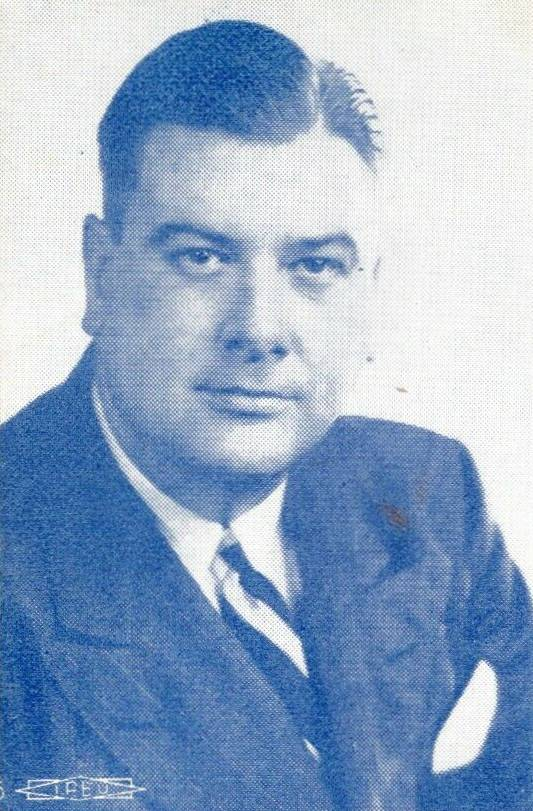
- Tehan c. 1942

Senior Judge of the United States District Court for the Eastern District of Wisconsin
- In office June 30, 1971 – November 27, 1975

Chief Judge of the United States District Court for the Eastern District of Wisconsin
- In office 1954–1971
- Preceded by: Office established
- Succeeded by: John W. Reynolds Jr.

United States district judge for the Eastern District of Wisconsin
- In office May 19, 1949 – June 30, 1971
- Appointed by: Harry S. Truman
- Preceded by: F. Ryan Duffy
- Succeeded by: Robert W. Warren

Member of the Wisconsin Senate from the 9th district
- In office January 4, 1943 – June 1, 1949
- Preceded by: Cornelius T. Young
- Succeeded by: Henry Maier

Member of the Wisconsin State Assembly from the Milwaukee 4 district
- In office January 4, 1937 – January 4, 1943
- Preceded by: John O'Malley
- Succeeded by: John A. Zoller

Personal details
- Born: Robert Emmet Tehan; January 7, 1905 Milwaukee, Wisconsin
- Died: November 27, 1975 (aged 70) Milwaukee, Wisconsin
- Party: Democratic
- Education: Marquette University (A.B.); Marquette University Law School (LL.B.)
- Profession: attorney, politician, judge

Robert Emmet Tehan (January 7, 1905 – November 27, 1975) was an American attorney, Democratic politician, and United States federal judge. He was a U.S. District Judge for the Eastern District of Wisconsin from 1949 to 1971, and was Chief Judge from 1954 to 1971. He previously served twelve years in the Wisconsin Legislature.

== Education and career ==
Born in Milwaukee, Wisconsin, Tehan received an Artium Baccalaureus degree from Marquette University in 1927. He received a Bachelor of Laws from Marquette University Law School in 1929. He was in private practice in Wisconsin from 1930 to 1949. He was a member of the Wisconsin State Assembly from 1937 to 1942. He was a member of the Wisconsin State Senate from 1942 to 1948.

== Federal judicial service ==
Tehan was nominated by President Harry S. Truman on April 5, 1949, to a seat on the United States District Court for the Eastern District of Wisconsin vacated by Judge F. Ryan Duffy. He was confirmed by the United States Senate on May 17, 1949, and received his commission two days later. He served as Chief Judge from 1954 to 1971. He assumed senior status on June 30, 1971. Tehan served until his death on November 27, 1975, in Milwaukee.

== Sources ==
Wisconsin Senate
Preceded by Cornelius T. Young	Member of the Wisconsin Senate from the 9th district January 4, 1943 – June 1, 1949	Succeeded by Henry Maier
Legal offices
Preceded by F. Ryan Duffy	United States District Judge for the Eastern District of Wisconsin; 1949–1971	Succeeded by Robert W. Warren
Office established	Chief Judge of the United States District Court for the Eastern District of Wisconsin; 1954–1971	Succeeded by John W. Reynolds Jr.
