= Donald Ferguson Brown =

Canadian politician

Member of the Canadian Parliament for Essex West
- In office 1945–1958
- Preceded by: Norman Alexander McLarty
- Succeeded by: Norman Leonard Spencer

Personal details
- Born: June 30, 1903 Petrolia, Ontario, Canada
- Died: October 8, 1959 (aged 56) Windsor, Ontario, Canada
- Party: Liberal
- Occupation: barrister, lawyer

Donald Ferguson Brown (June 30, 1903 – October 8, 1959) was a Canadian politician, barrister and lawyer. He was born in Petrolia, Ontario, Canada. He was elected to the House of Commons of Canada as a Member of the Liberal Party in the 1945 election to represent the riding of Essex West. He was re-elected in the elections of 1949, 1953, 1957 and defeated in the election of 1958. During his federal political career, he was a member of various committees including: Chairperson of the Special Committee appointed to consider Bill no. 305 : An act respecting immigration, Co-chair of the Joint Committee on Capital and Corporal Punishment and Lotteries and a member of the Joint Committee on Old Age Security. He died in 1959.
