= Norman Alexander McLarty =

Canadian politician

The Hon. Norman Alexander McLarty
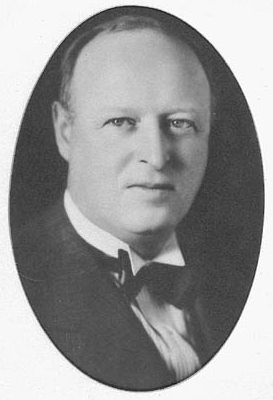

Member of the Canadian Parliament for Essex West
- In office 1935–1945
- Preceded by: Sidney Cecil Robinson
- Succeeded by: Donald Ferguson Brown

Personal details
- Born: February 18, 1889 St. Thomas, Ontario
- Died: September 6, 1945 (aged 56)
- Party: Liberal
- Cabinet: Postmaster General (1939); Minister of Labour (1939–1941); Secretary of State of Canada (1941–1945)
- Committees: Chair, Special Committee on Bill No 98 respecting unemployment insurance (1940–1942)

Norman Alexander McLarty, PC (February 18, 1889 – September 6, 1945) was a Canadian politician.

Born in St. Thomas, Ontario, he was first elected to the House of Commons of Canada representing the riding of Essex West in the 1935 federal election.

A Liberal, he was re-elected in 1940. He was the Postmaster General, Minister of Labour, and Secretary of State of Canada in the cabinet of Mackenzie King. He served as acting president of the National Liberal Federation in 1943.

Party political offices
Preceded by Norman Platt Lambert	President of the Liberal Party of Canada; 1943	Succeeded by Wishart McLea Robertson
