= Hayward (town), Wisconsin =

Hayward, Wisconsin
- Town
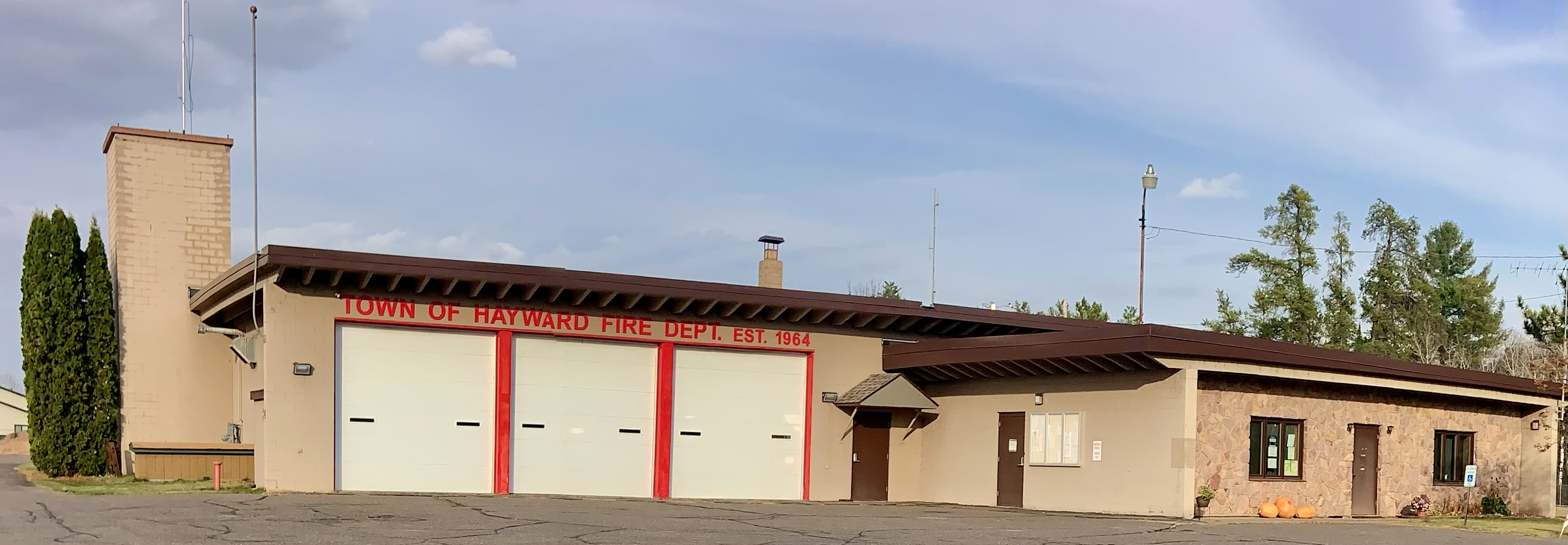
- Town hall

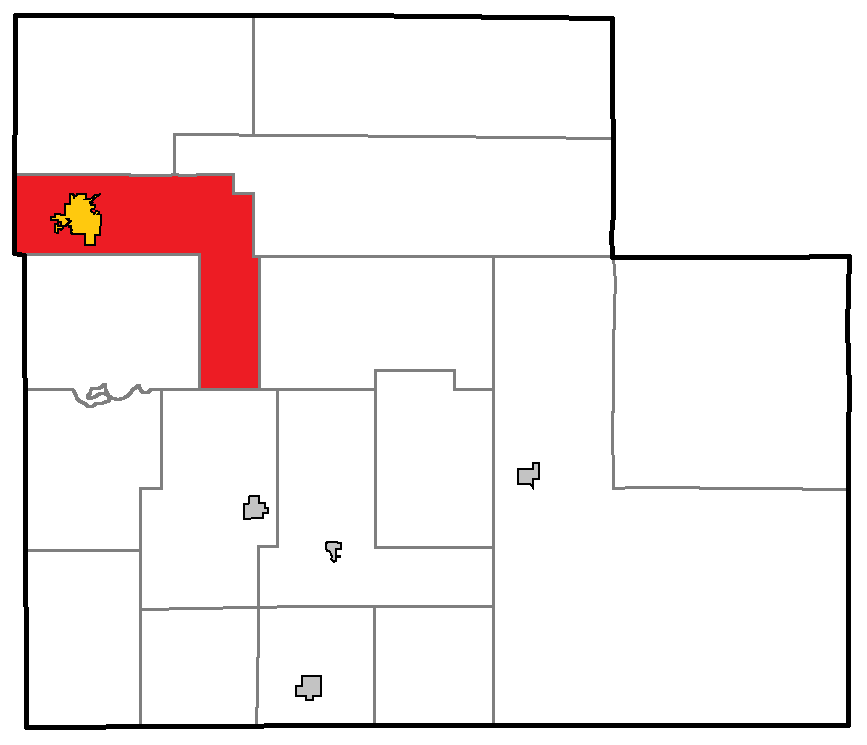
- Location of Hayward, within Sawyer County
- Coordinates: 45°59′35″N 91°24′28″W
- Country: United States
- State: Wisconsin
- County: Sawyer

Area
  - Total: 64.0 sq mi (165.8 km^{2})
  - Land: 57.4 sq mi (148.7 km^{2})
  - Water: 6.6 sq mi (17.0 km^{2})
- Elevation: 1,457 ft (444 m)

Population (2020)
  - Total: 3,765
  - Density: 65.58/sq mi (25.32/km^{2})
- Time zone: UTC-6 (Central (CST))
  - Summer (DST): UTC-5 (CDT)
- Area codes: 715 and 534
- FIPS code: 55-33475
- GNIS feature ID: 1583371
- Website: https://townofhaywardwi.gov/

Hayward is a town in Sawyer County, Wisconsin, United States. The population was 3,765 at the 2020 census. The town is located near the City of Hayward. The census-designated place of Chief Lake is located in the town.

== Transportation ==
U.S. Highway 63, Wisconsin Highway 27, Wisconsin Highway 77 and County Highway B are the main routes in the community.

== Geography ==
According to the United States Census Bureau, the town has a total area of 64.0 square miles (165.8 km^{2}), of which 57.4 square miles (148.7 km^{2}) is land and 6.6 square miles (17.0 km^{2}) (10.27%) is water.

Hayward is located 71 miles southeast of Superior, 27 miles northeast of Spooner, and 57 miles southwest of Ashland.

== Demographics ==
As of the census of 2000, there were 3,279 people, 1,219 households, and 898 families residing in the town. The population density was 57.1 people per square mile (22.0/km^{2}). There were 1,841 housing units at an average density of 32.1 per square mile (12.4/km^{2}). The racial makeup of the town was 74.53% White, 0.09% Black or African American, 23.54% Native American, 0.40% Asian, 0.06% Pacific Islander, 0.18% from other races, and 1.19% from two or more races. 0.64% of the population were Hispanic or Latino of any race.

There were 1,219 households, out of which 34.4% had children under the age of 18 living with them, 56.3% were married couples living together, 12.5% had a female householder with no husband present, and 26.3% were non-families. 21.6% of all households were made up of individuals, and 9.2% had someone living alone who was 65 years of age or older. The average household size was 2.63 and the average family size was 3.05.

In the town, the population was spread out, with 28.5% under the age of 18, 5.9% from 18 to 24, 25.4% from 25 to 44, 24.0% from 45 to 64, and 16.2% who were 65 years of age or older. The median age was 39 years. For every 100 females, there were 97.9 males. For every 100 females age 18 and over, there were 94.7 males.

The median income for a household in the town was $36,895, and the median income for a family was $43,300. Males had a median income of $30,972 versus $21,534 for females. The per capita income for the town was $17,382. About 12.6% of families and 13.6% of the population were below the poverty line, including 18.2% of those under age 18 and 13.4% of those age 65 or over.

== Notable people ==
- Carl R. Nyman, farmer, businessman, and politician, lived in the town
