= Sidney Cecil Robinson =

Canadian politician (1870–1943)

Member of Parliament for Essex West
- In office October 1925 – October 1935
- Preceded by: riding created
- Succeeded by: Norman Alexander McLarty

Personal details
- Born: Sidney Cecil Robinson; 12 January 1870 Toronto, Ontario, Canada
- Died: 30 April 1943 (aged 73)
- Party: Conservative
- Spouse(s): Martha Maud Stanley m. 28 June 1899
- Profession: Business executive, industrialist, manager

Sidney Cecil Robinson (12 January 1870 – 30 April 1943) was a Conservative member of the House of Commons of Canada. He was born in Toronto, Ontario and became a business executive, industrialist and manager. In 1905, he was also a municipal councillor for Walkerville, Ontario.

Robinson attended the Windsor Collegiate Institute then Detroit Business University. He served in the military with the 21st Essex Fusiliers, including service in World War I. He recruited for the 99th Battalion of the Canadian Expeditionary Force. He attained a rank of colonel.

He was first elected to Parliament at the Essex West riding in the 1925 general election after a previous unsuccessful campaign at Essex North in a 1 March 1923 by-election. Robinson was re-elected in 1926 and 1930. He was defeated by Norman Alexander McLarty of the Liberal party in the 1935 federal election.
