= Theodore M. Thomas =

American politician (born 1870)

Member of the Wisconsin State Assembly from the Chippewa 2nd district
- In office January 7, 1907 – January 4, 1909
- Preceded by: Louis L. Thayer
- Succeeded by: Arnt Erickson

Acting District Attorney of Price County, Wisconsin
- In office March 1, 1909 – April 1909
- Appointed by: James O. Davidson
- Preceded by: W. K. Parkinson
- Succeeded by: W. K. Parkinson

Personal details
- Born: September 11, 1870 Lamartine, Wisconsin, U.S.
- Died: between 1940 and 1954
- Resting place: Florence Cemetery, Florence, Alabama
- Party: Republican
- Spouse: Jeanette Irene Meiklejohn (m. 1900; died 1938)
- Children: none
- Parent: Henry I. Thomas (father)
- Education: LL.B.
- Profession: Lawyer, politician

Theodore Manuel Thomas (September 11, 1870 – ???) was an American lawyer and progressive Republican politician from Rusk County, Wisconsin. He served one term in the Wisconsin State Assembly, representing Rusk County and the northern half of Chippewa County during the 48th Wisconsin Legislature. In historical documents, his name was often abbreviated as T. M. Thomas.

== Early life ==
Theodore Thomas was born in the town of Lamartine, Wisconsin, in Fond du Lac County, in September 1870. He was raised and educated in Fond du Lac County. He trained as a lawyer and was admitted to the bar at Beaver Dam, Wisconsin, on December 18, 1899. He then practiced law in Beaver Dam until July 1904, when he moved to Ladysmith, Wisconsin.

== Political career ==
At Ladysmith, he was elected city attorney in 1905 and re-elected in 1906. As an attorney, he was appointed receiver of Ladysmith's First National Bank, after it failed in 1905. Controversy stemming from this bank failure and his role unwinding the bank's debts continued to plague him for years afterward.

In 1906, he ran for Wisconsin State Assembly, seeking the Republican Party nomination in what was then Chippewa County's 2nd Assembly district. The Chippewa 2nd district comprised the northern half of Chippewa County and all of Rusk County (which had been part of Chippewa County when that district plan had been enacted). Thomas won the primary, defeating Thomas Emmerton of Bloomer and O. G. Briggs of Bruce. He defeated Democrat Sewel Peterson in the general election and went on to serve in the 48th Wisconsin Legislature. Thomas did not run for re-election in 1908. While serving in the legislature he formed a law partnership with Jorge W. Carow which would continue for several years.

Shortly after leaving the Legislature, in March 1909, Thomas was appointed to serve as district attorney of Price County, Wisconsin, after governor James O. Davidson suspended district attorney W. K. Parkinson for failure to prosecute liquor cases. Parkinson was ultimately reinstated in April after appealing his case to the governor.

Thomas continued his political activity in subsequent years. He was on the Republican slate of presidential electors for Wisconsin in 1912. Before the election, he strangely admitted that he intended to cast his vote at the general election for the Democratic nominee Woodrow Wilson, but if Taft won the state of Wisconsin, Thomas pledged to cast his electoral vote for Taft as instructed. The issue became moot, since Wilson won the election in a landslide.

Later that decade, Thomas was appointed as a commissioner of the circuit court in Rusk County, and served in that role for several years.

Thomas was elected as a delegate to the 1920 Republican National Convention as a La Follette Progressive. That fall, he made his first bid for U.S. House of Representatives, launching a primary challenge against Adolphus Peter Nelson with La Follette's endorsement in Wisconsin's 11th congressional district. A third candidate, former state representative Hubert H. Peavey, also ran in the Republican primary. Nelson survived with 47% of the vote.

After flirting with another run for congress in 1924, Thomas entered the race in 1926 to challenge the incumbent, Hubert H. Peavey, who by then had already won the Republican primary. Thomas ran as an independent progressive Republican in the general election, but received only 27% of the vote.

== Later years ==
Less than a year later, Thomas filed for bankruptcy. A short time later, he moved to Chicago, Illinois, where he resumed his legal career. He subsequently moved to the south, residing for a time in Colbert County, Alabama.

He likely went to live with his brother, Judson, in Florida, after his wife's death in 1938, as that was the last place he was described living in his sister's obituary in 1940. He most likely died before 1954, since his brother's obituary that year describes only their niece as survivor.

== Electoral history ==
=== U.S. House (1920) ===
Wisconsin's 11th Congressional District Election, 1920
Party	Candidate	Votes	%	±%
Republican Primary, September 7, 1920
Republican	Adolphus P. Nelson (incumbent)	16,623	46.72%	
Republican	Theodore M. Thomas	10,445	29.35%	
Republican	Hubert H. Peavey	8,498	23.88%	
	Scattering	16	0.04%	
Plurality		6,178	17.36%	
Total votes		35,582	100.0%	

=== U.S. House (1926) ===
Wisconsin's 11th Congressional District Election, 1926
Party	Candidate	Votes	%	±%
General Election, November 2, 1926
Republican	Hubert H. Peavey (incumbent)	31,105	70.14%	−8.00pp
Independent Republican	Theodore M. Thomas	11,860	26.74%	
Prohibition	Harriet Smith Olson	1,368	3.08%	
	Scattering	14	0.03%	
Plurality		19,245	43.40%	-12.95pp
Total votes		44,347	100.0%	-28.16%
Republican hold				

Wisconsin State Assembly
Preceded by Louis L. Thayer	Member of the Wisconsin State Assembly from the Chippewa 2nd district January 7, 1907 – January 4, 1909	Succeeded by Arnt Erickson
