= Detroit College of Business =

Defunct business college

The Detroit College of Business was a four-year business college that was founded in 1962 and located in Dearborn, Michigan, that existed until 2000 when it was subsumed into Davenport University.

== Origins ==
The school had antecedents going back to 1850, including as Detroit Business University. Its immediate predecessor was the Detroit Business Institute, which had been based in the Michigan Theatre Building in Downtown Detroit.

In 1962, these operations were moved to Dearborn and substantially recreated as Detroit College of Business, based around the purchase of a facility that had previously belonged to Henry Ford Community College.

== Campuses ==
The Detroit College of Business was a commuter college with no student housing. Indeed, a profile in the Detroit Free Press described the school as "A commuter school on a concrete campus ... [that] is hard to notice, situated on 13 acres ... behind a car wash."

The Detroit College of Business also had campuses in Flint, Michigan and Warren, Michigan, both begun in 1973. There was also a branch in Port Huron, Michigan, which offered one-year programs.

== Programs and admissions ==
The Detroit College of Business offered both four-year bachelor's degree and a two-year associate degree. It featured open admissions.

In the late 1980s, the school had about 3,500 total students. By the mid-1990s, it had around 1,600 full-time students and 1,500 part-time students. It was known for programs in management, marketing, accounting, office technology, and information systems. The school's calendar was based around academic quarters.

In the late 1980s, three-quarters of the student population was female, nearly half the population were from minority backgrounds, and well over half were receiving some kind of financial aid.

A large majority of the school's faculty were part-time instructors, who were employed full-time in various fields and who benefited students with their contacts.

== Athletics and other student activities ==
Despite its lack of a residential basis, the Detroit College of Business did have some student activities. There was one varsity sport, golf, and it offered scholarships; the golf team competed against schools such as Fanshawe College, St. Clair College, and the University of Windsor in Canada as well as the University of Detroit and Wayne State University in the United States. There were also a variety of club sports.

Other student activities included student government, a student newspaper, a business club, school dances, the Alpha Iota professional sorority for women in the field of business, and a fraternity.

== Merger ==
The school had had an administrative merger in 1986 with the Davenport College of Business, which was based in Grand Rapids, Michigan and had similar programs and goals, such that students could apply to either of them.

In 2000, it was part of a merger with Davenport College and Great Lakes College that created Davenport University, at which point the Detroit College of Business name stopped being used. The resulting business school emphasized post-graduate degrees.

== Notable alumni ==
- Simone Cromer, social media personality
- Agnes Dobronski, Michigan House of Representatives
