= Millennium Bureau of Canada =

Former agency of the Government of Canada

Millennium Bureau of Canada was a small, temporary agency of the Government of Canada, to celebrate the "millennium" during the year 2000. Its theme was Sharing the Memory, Shaping the Dream.

The Weather Network and MétéoMédia served as partners with the agency, as the official promoters of related activities across Canada.

== Launch ==
The program was launched by Prime Minister Jean Chrétien at the Canadian Museum of Civilization, on March 12, 1998. The federal government intentionally avoided running its own projects, in favour of assisting grassroots projects with funding. The intent was also that projects would be spread out between 1998 and 2000, as opposed to everything on New Year's Eve and New Year's Day.

Deputy Prime Minister Herb Gray noted that multiple large polls showed public support for millennium celebrations. (Gray oversaw the program, with diplomat Lawrence Dickenson as its executive director.

Some projects were announced at the launch, including Trans-Canada Trail funding, a national tour of the RCMP Musical Ride, and Canada: A People's History mini-series on CBC.

Details of the Millennium Partnership Project was announced in June, the actual funding program.

== Reaction ==
Canadian Taxpayers Federation criticized any spending on the millennium. Regina Leader-Post noted a debt issue for the federal government, in its editorial, suggesting the government reconsider the millennium funding. Kitchener-Waterloo Record similarly noted that the deficit was "now defeated," suggesting that people didn't "need a nickel" to reflect.

== Projects ==
The 665 projects carried out by the Millennium Bureau include:

- Passionate vision: Discovering Canada's national parks ($700,000), a book featuring the photography of Canadian astronaut Roberta Bondar
- The Gun Sculpture ($250,000), an artwork by Wallis Kendal and Sandra Bromley, of decommissioned guns
- Trans Canada Trail Relay 2000, which received $5 million for a project which included over 800 participating communities and "tens of thousands of volunteer leaders"

Alberta

- Calgary Town Hall Millennium Project ($116,700) towards rebuilding Calgary's original town hall at Heritage Park Historical Village
- Dinosaur 2000 Project ($250,000), what would become known as World's Largest Dinosaur in Drumheller

Ontario

- International Children's Games Millennium Festival, which received $300,000 for a Hamiton-based event
- Tomb of the Unknown Soldier, transferring an unknown soldier from Vimy, France in 2000 to the National War Memorial

- Tall Ships in Halifax, Nova Scotia
- Relay 2000 of the Trans Canada Trail in Hull, Quebec on September 9, 2000
- Literacy Builders
- Canada Remembers 2000
- Pacific Grace Replica Schooner
- Meewasin Valley Trail System
- Canada Dance Festival
- Fisheries Museum of the Atlantic Millennium Exhibit
- The Islendingur: A Timeless Adventure in L'Anse aux Meadows, Newfoundland

The CMPP received more than 10,000 applications representing more than $1.9 billion in financial assistance for millennium projects. Since it was launched in 1998, the CMPP approved 1,745 projects representing just over $149 million in funding.
