= Dovre, Wisconsin =

- Town
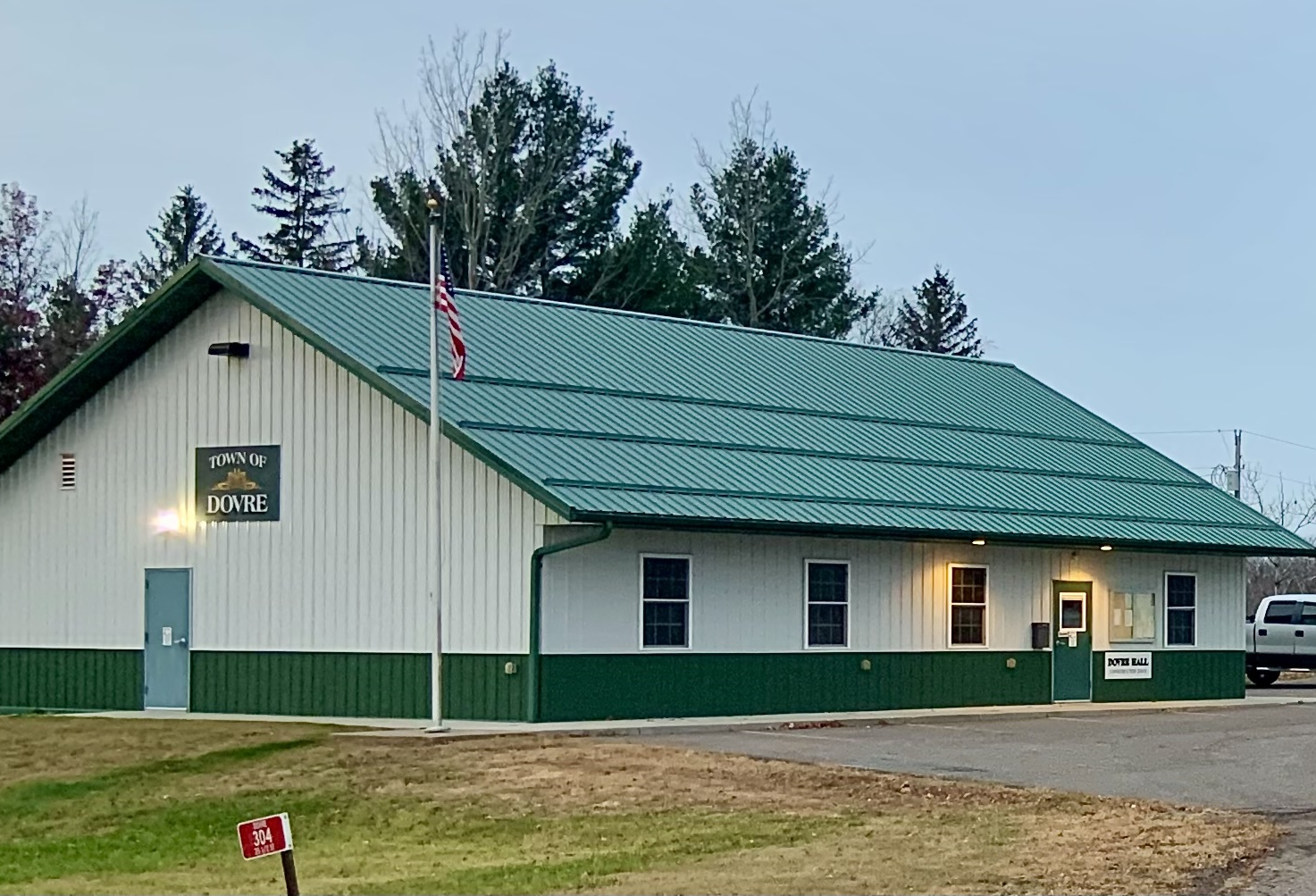
- Town hall
- Motto: "Our Little Spot in the Country"
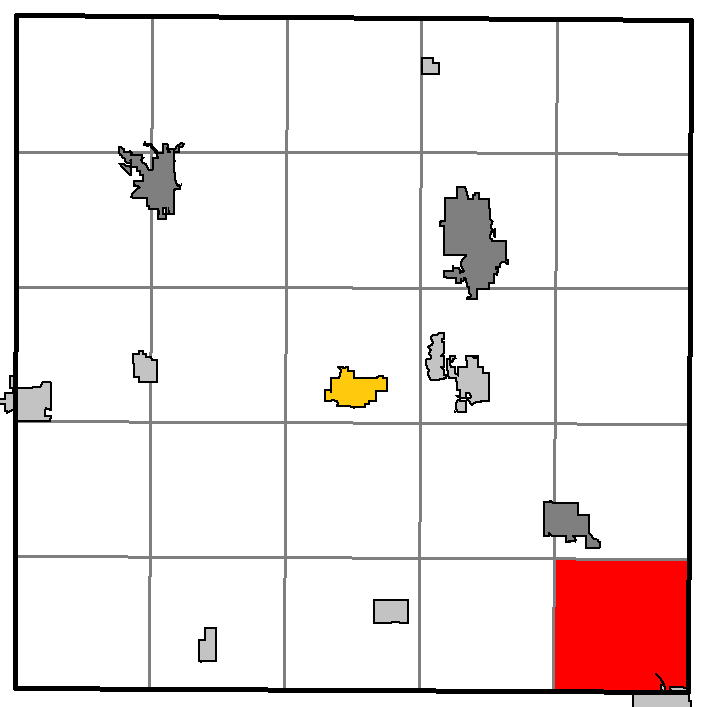
- Location of Dovre, within Barron County, Wisconsin

- Location of Barron County, Wisconsin
- Coordinates: 45°15′1″N 91°36′1″W
- Country: United States
- State: Wisconsin
- County: Barron

Area
  - Total: 35.3 sq mi (91.3 km^{2})
  - Land: 35.2 sq mi (91.1 km^{2})
  - Water: 0.077 sq mi (0.2 km^{2})
- Elevation: 1,079 ft (329 m)

Population (2020)
  - Total: 825
  - Density: 23.5/sq mi (9.06/km^{2})
- Time zone: UTC-6 (Central (CST))
  - Summer (DST): UTC-5 (CDT)
- Area codes: 715 & 534
- FIPS code: 55-20650
- GNIS feature ID: 1583095
- Website: www.townofdovre.com

Dovre is a town in Barron County in the U.S. state of Wisconsin. The population was 825 at the 2020 census, down from 849 at the 2010 census.

== Geography ==
Dovre is located in the southeastern corner of Barron County, bounded by Chippewa County on the south and east. U.S. Route 53, a four-lane expressway, crosses the town from northwest to southeast. There are no exits within the town; the nearest access points are just south of Dovre in the village of New Auburn and just north of Dovre in the town of Chetek.

According to the United States Census Bureau, Dovre has a total area of 35.3 square miles (91.3 km^{2}), of which 35.2 square miles (91.1 km^{2}) is land and 0.08 square miles (0.2 km^{2}), or 0.27%, is water.

== Demographics ==
As of the census of 2000, there were 680 people, 238 households, and 181 families residing in the town. The population density was 19.4 people per square mile (7.5/km^{2}). There were 259 housing units at an average density of 7.4 per square mile (2.8/km^{2}). The racial makeup of the town was 98.24% White, 0.29% African American, 0.44% Native American, 0.15% Asian, and 0.88% from two or more races. Hispanic or Latino people of any race were 0.59% of the population.

There were 238 households, out of which 35.7% had children under the age of 18 living with them, 67.2% were married couples living together, 5.0% had a female householder with no husband present, and 23.9% were non-families. 14.7% of all households were made up of individuals, and 7.1% had someone living alone who was 65 years of age or older. The average household size was 2.86 and the average family size was 3.23.

In the town, the population was spread out, with 27.5% under the age of 18, 10.1% from 18 to 24, 26.6% from 25 to 44, 26.3% from 45 to 64, and 9.4% who were 65 years of age or older. The median age was 36 years. For every 100 females, there were 110.5 males. For every 100 females age 18 and over, there were 114.3 males.

The median income for a household in the town was $36,786, and the median income for a family was $39,750. Males had a median income of $27,330 versus $17,750 for females. The per capita income for the town was $15,624. About 8.1% of families and 10.6% of the population were below the poverty line, including 5.9% of those under age 18 and 10.4% of those age 65 or over.
