= New Auburn, Wisconsin =

- Village
- Location of New Auburn in Chippewa County and Barron County, Wisconsin
- Coordinates: 45°12′14″N 91°33′42″W
- Country: United States
- State: Wisconsin
- Counties: Chippewa, Barron

Area
  - Total: 3.40 sq mi (8.81 km^{2})
  - Land: 3.40 sq mi (8.81 km^{2})
  - Water: 0 sq mi (0.00 km^{2})
- Elevation: 1,102 ft (336 m)

Population (2020)
  - Total: 562
  - Density: 165/sq mi (63.8/km^{2})
- Time zone: UTC-6 (Central (CST))
  - Summer (DST): UTC-5 (CDT)
- Area codes: 715 & 534
- FIPS code: 55-56350
- GNIS feature ID: 1570199
- Website: www.newauburn-wi.com

New Auburn is a village in Barron and Chippewa counties in the U.S. state of Wisconsin. The population was 562 at the 2020 census. Of these, 537 were in Chippewa County, and 25 were in Barron County. The village is located mostly within the Town of Auburn in Chippewa County. Small portions extend east into the adjacent Town of Bloomer, Chippewa County and north into the Town of Dovre in Barron County.

== Geography ==
New Auburn is located at 45°12′14″N 91°33′42″W (45.203766, -91.561570).

According to the United States Census Bureau, the village has a total area of 3.39 square miles (8.78 km^{2}), all land.

New Auburn is located along U.S. Highway 53; County Roads AA, M, Q and SS also pass through the community.

== Demographics ==
2000 Census age pyramid for Eau Claire County

Historical population
Census	Pop.	Note	%±
1910	364		—
1920	386		6.0%
1930	376		−2.6%
1940	398		5.9%
1950	371		−6.8%
1960	383		3.2%
1970	368		−3.9%
1980	466		26.6%
1990	485		4.1%
2000	562		15.9%
2010	548		−2.5%
2020	562		2.6%
U.S. Decennial Census

=== 2010 census ===
As of the census of 2010, there were 548 people, 217 households, and 139 families living in the village. The population density was 161.7 inhabitants per square mile (62.4/km^{2}). There were 235 housing units at an average density of 69.3 per square mile (26.8/km^{2}). The racial makeup of the village was 97.3% White, 0.2% African American, 0.2% Native American, 0.4% Asian, and 2.0% from two or more races.

There were 217 households, of which 36.9% had children under the age of 18 living with them, 47.9% were married couples living together, 9.7% had a female householder with no husband present, 6.5% had a male householder with no wife present, and 35.9% were non-families. 30.4% of all households were made up of individuals, and 12.4% had someone living alone who was 65 years of age or older. The average household size was 2.53 and the average family size was 3.13.

The median age in the village was 34.6 years. 29% of residents were under the age of 18; 7.7% were between the ages of 18 and 24; 27.6% were from 25 to 44; 22.4% were from 45 to 64; and 13.3% were 65 years of age or older. The gender makeup of the village was 52.0% male and 48.0% female.

=== 2000 census ===
As of the census of 2000, there were 562 people, 216 households, and 147 families living in the village. The population density was 165.8 people per square mile (64.0/km^{2}). There were 222 housing units at an average density of 65.5 per square mile (25.3/km^{2}). The racial makeup of the village was 99.11% White, 0.18% Native American, and 0.71% from two or more races. Hispanic or Latino people of any race were 0.36% of the population.

There were 216 households, out of which 34.3% had children under the age of 18 living with them, 50.9% were married couples living together, 11.6% had a female householder with no husband present, and 31.9% were non-families. 26.9% of all households were made up of individuals, and 9.3% had someone living alone who was 65 years of age or older. The average household size was 2.60 and the average family size was 3.17.

In the village, the population was spread out, with 30.8% under the age of 18, 5.7% from 18 to 24, 28.1% from 25 to 44, 23.1% from 45 to 64, and 12.3% who were 65 years of age or older. The median age was 35 years. For every 100 females, there were 100.7 males. For every 100 females age 18 and over, there were 100.5 males.

The median income for a household in the village was $30,341, and the median income for a family was $36,250. Males had a median income of $26,683 versus $20,375 for females. The per capita income for the village was $13,444. 9.9% of the population and 9.6% of families were below the poverty line. Out of the total population, 9.9% of those under the age of 18 and 6.7% of those 65 and older were living below the poverty line.

== Population: 485 ==
New Auburn is the setting of Michael Perry's memoir, Population: 485: Meeting your Neighbors One Siren at a Time, in which he describes his experiences as a volunteer firefighter and EMT for the New Auburn Area Fire Department.

== Notable people ==
- Arnt Erickson, businessman and politician; village supervisor and resident of New Auburn (born in Norway)
- Michael Perry, author, born and raised in New Auburn
