= Walter J. Domach =

American politician

Walter J. Domach (May 25, 1909 in Milwaukee, Wisconsin – ?) He attended St. John's Cathedral High School and Spencerian Business College., was a member of the Wisconsin State Assembly.

== Career ==
Domach was a member of the Assembly from 1939 to 1940. Previously, he was a member of the Democratic National Committee from 1936 to 1938.
