= Gutchess Metropolitan Business College =

Gutchess Metropolitan Business College was a business college in Detroit that began in 1896 (130 years ago) and was still operating in 1920.
