= Norman Spencer (politician) =

Canadian politician

Member of Parliament for Essex West
- In office March 1958 – June 1962
- Preceded by: Donald Ferguson Brown
- Succeeded by: Herb Gray

Personal details
- Born: Norman Leonard Spencer; 21 August 1902 Howard Township, Ontario
- Died: 26 February 1966 (aged 63)
- Party: Progressive Conservative
- Profession: lawyer

Norman Leonard Spencer (21 August 1902 – 26 February 1966) was born in Howard Township, Ontario. He was a Progressive Conservative party member of the House of Commons of Canada.

He was first elected at the Essex West riding in the 1958 general election after an unsuccessful attempt there in the 1957 election. Spencer was re-elected for a second term in the 1958 election but was defeated by Herb Gray of the Liberal Party in the 1962 election.
