= Wisconsin Historical Society Press =

- Parent company: Wisconsin Historical Society
- Founded: 1855
- Country of origin: United States
- Headquarters location: Madison, Wisconsin
- Distribution: Chicago Distribution Center
- Publication types: Books, Magazines
- Official website: www.wisconsinhistory.org/whspress/

The Wisconsin Historical Society Press, operated by the Wisconsin Historical Society, in Madison, Wisconsin, is Wisconsin's oldest book publisher and has more than 100 titles in print. The Wisconsin Historical Society (WHS) Press publishes books that connect people in Wisconsin and the Midwest to their past. WHS Press published its first book, Volume I of the Wisconsin Historical Collections, in 1855 to showcase some of the holdings of the newly founded Wisconsin Historical Society.

Since then, the Press has explored Wisconsin history topics in a variety of formats, from booklets and research guides to the six-volume History of Wisconsin series and softcover titles. In recent years, the Press has concentrated on creating books that appeal to a wider audience, including narratives about people and events, explorations of historical topics, and stories that speak to a regional community but also reach across borders. The Press began publishing a series of books for young readers in 2005 called The Badger Biography series that tells the stories of Wisconsin people to a new generation of readers. The Wisconsin Magazine of History, the quarterly magazine given as a benefit of membership in the Wisconsin Historical Society, is also published by the WHS Press and has presented the images and stories of Wisconsin's past since 1917. WHS Press books are available in bookstores and through the Wisconsin Historical Society store.
