= Alfred Schultz =

American politician

Alfred Charles Schultz was a member of the Wisconsin State Assembly.

== Biography ==
Schultz was born on January 20, 1872, in Bartlett, Illinois. He married Alma Katherine Schmidt on June 25, 1896, in Bartlett. He later resided in Bruce, Wisconsin.

== Career ==
Schultz was elected to the Assembly in 1924 and 1926. Additionally he was a member of the Platteville, Wisconsin City Council and a member and Chairman of the Platteville Board of Education (similar to school board). Schultz was also Chairman of Atlanta, Wisconsin and a member of the Rusk County, Wisconsin Board of Supervisors. He was a Republican.
