= Carl R. Nyman =

American businessman and politician

Carl Richard Nyman (August 27, 1895 – December 25, 1983) was an American businessman and politician.

Born in Sweden, Nyman emigrated to the United States and settled in the town of Hayward, Wisconsin. Nyman served in the United States Army during World War I. He took engineering and secretarial courses while in night school. He also went to the Dunn County, Wisconsin Agricultural School. Nyman was a machinist and was a poultry farmer. Nyman was also in the real estate and insurance business. Nyman served as chairman of the Hayward Town Board. He also served on the Sawyer County, Wisconsin Board of Supervisors. In April 1937, Nyman was elected to the Wisconsin State Assembly in a special election to fill the vacancy cause by the death of Jorge W. Carow. Nyman was elected on the Wisconsin Progressive Party ticket. Nyman died at St. Mary's Hospital in Duluth, Minnesota.
