= Thomas Wilson Crothers =

Canadian politician

The Honourable Thomas Wilson Crothers PC
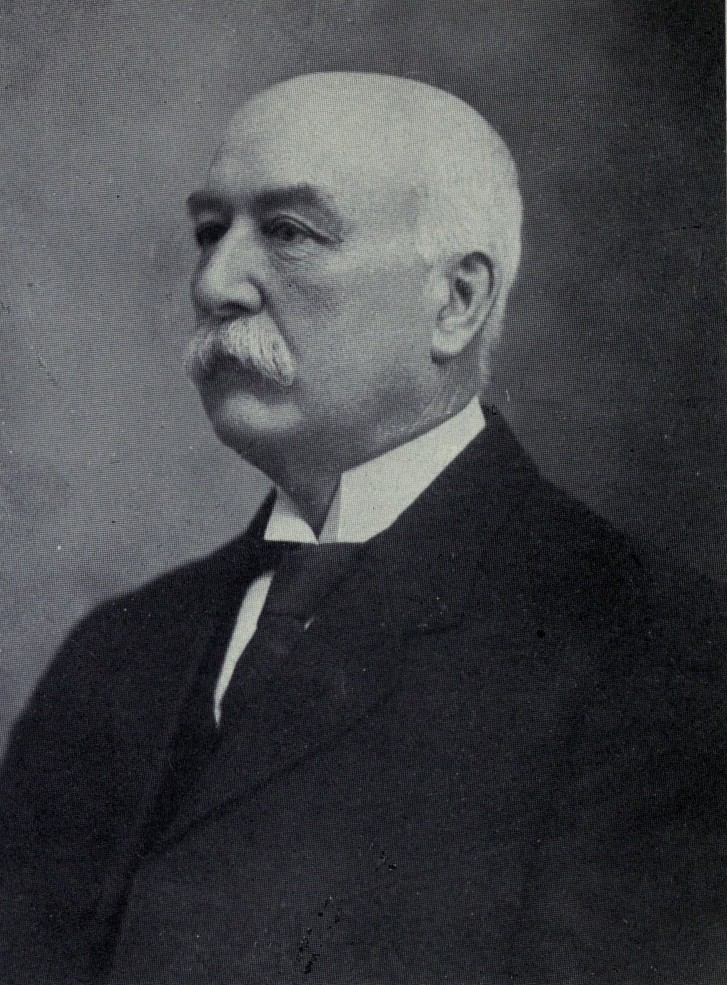

Minister of Labour
- In office October 10, 1911 – November 16, 1918
- Appointed by: Robert Borden
- Preceded by: William Lyon Mackenzie King
- Succeeded by: Gideon Robertson

Canadian Senator from Ontario
- In office October 3, 1911 – December 10, 1921
- Appointed by: Arthur Meighen

Member of Parliament for Elgin West
- In office 1908–1921
- Preceded by: William Jackson
- Succeeded by: Hugh Cummings McKillop

Personal details
- Born: January 1, 1850 Northport, Canada West
- Died: December 10, 1921 (aged 71)
- Party: Conservative

Thomas Wilson Crothers, PC (January 1, 1850 – December 10, 1921) was a Canadian politician.

== Background ==
Born in Northport, Canada West, he was a lawyer and teacher before being elected to the House of Commons of Canada for the Ontario riding of Elgin West in the 1908 federal election. A Conservative, he was re-elected in 1911 and as a Unionist in 1917. From 1911 to 1918, he was the Minister of Labour. In October 1921, he was appointed to the Senate of Canada representing the senatorial division of Ontario. He died in office just two months later in December 1921.
