= William Jackson (Canadian politician) =

Canadian politician

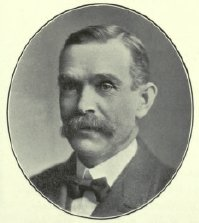

Member of the Canadian Parliament for Elgin West
- In office 1904–1908
- Preceded by: Jabel Robinson
- Succeeded by: Thomas Wilson Crothers

Personal details
- Born: April 18, 1858 Port Stanley, Canada West
- Died: May 31, 1938 (aged 80)
- Party: Conservative

William Jackson (April 18, 1858 – May 31, 1938) was a Canadian politician.

Born in Port Stanley, Canada West, Jackson was educated at the High School of St. Thomas and the Ontario Business College in Belleville, Ontario. A farmer by occupation, he was elected to the House of Commons of Canada for the riding of Elgin West in the general elections of 1904. A Conservative, he did not run in 1908.

He was County Councillor for District No. 3, County of Elgin for eight years and Warden of the County in 1902.
