= List of mayors of St. Thomas, Ontario =

List of St. Thomas, Ontario's mayors

This is a list of reeves and mayors of St. Thomas, Ontario, Canada. St. Thomas was incorporated as a village in 1852, as a town in 1861, and as a city in 1881.

== Village reeves ==
- 1852–1855 — David Parish
- 1856–1856 — Edward Ermatinger
- 1857–1857 — Asa Howard
- 1858–1858 — Thomas Arkell
- 1859–1859 — Archibald McIntyre
- 1860–1860 — Dr. George Southwick

== Town reeve ==
- 1861–1861 — Archilbald McInytre

== Town mayors ==
- 1861–1861 — M.T.Moore
- 1862–1864 — Dr. George Southwick
- 1865–1871 — Thomas Arkell
- 1872–1872 — Archibald McLachlin
- 1873–1876 — Daniel Drake
- 1877–1878 — Dr. D. McLarty
- 1879–1880 — John E Smith

== City mayors ==
=== 1881–1900 ===
- 1881–1882 — Dr. William C. VanBuskirk
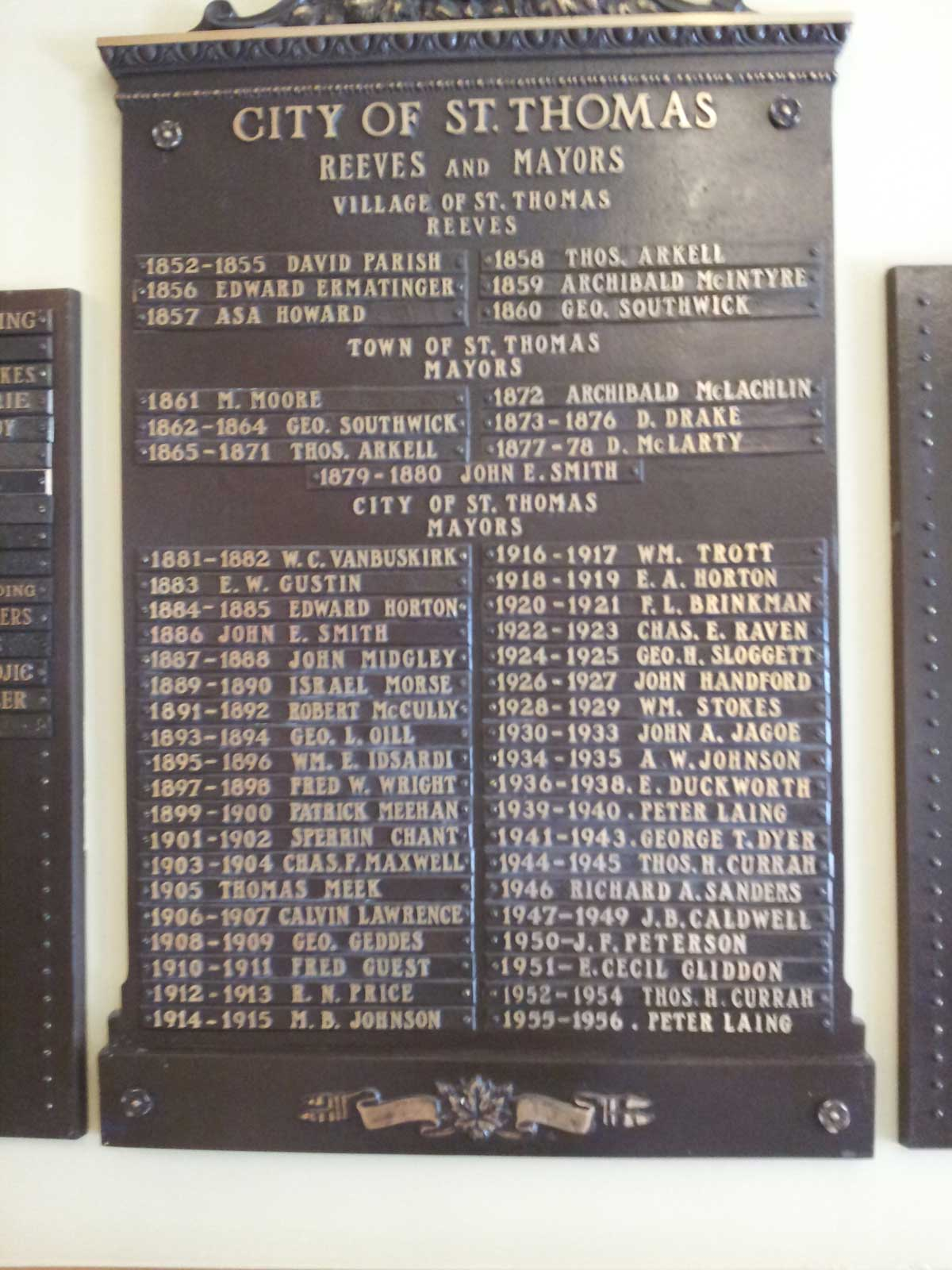
  First Panel of Mayors & Reeves of St. Thomas, Ontario, Canada. Located in City Hall, Talbot St. St. Thomas.
- 1883–1883 — Dr. Eliphalet Wilbur Gustin
- 1884–1885 — Edward Horton
- 1886–1886 — John E. Smith
- 1887–1888 — John Midgley
- 1889–1890 — Israel Morse
- 1891–1892 — Robert McCully
- 1893–1894 — George L. Oill
- 1895–1896 — William E. Idsardi
- 1897–1898 — Frederick W. Wright
- 1899–1900 — Patrick Meehan

=== 1901–1950 ===
- 1901–1902 — Sperrin Chant
- 1903–1904 — Charles Francis Maxwell
- 1905–1905 — Thomas Meek
- 1906–1907 — Calvin Lawrence
- 1908–1909 — George Geddes
- 1910–1911 — Dr. Frederick Guest
- 1912–1913 — Robert N. Price
- 1914–1915 — Marshall B. Johnson
- 1916–1917 — William Trott
- 1918–1919 — Edward A. Horton
- 1920–1921 — Frank L. Brinkman
- 1922–1923 — Charles E. Raven
- 1924–1925 — George H. Sloggett
- 1926–1927 — John Handford
- 1928–1929 — William Stokes
- 1930–1933 — John A. Jagoe
- 1934–1935 — Angus W. Johnson
- 1936–1938 — Ernest Duckworth
- 1939–1940 — Peter Laing, Jr.
- 1941–1943 — George T. Dyer
- 1944–1945 — Thomas H. Currah
- 1946–1946 — Richard A. Sanders
- 1947–1949 — J. Bruce Caldwell
- 1950–1950 — Major John F. Peterson

=== 1951–present ===
- 1951–1951 — Dr. E. Cecil Gliddon
- 1952–1954 — Thomas H. Currah
- 1955–1956 — Peter Laing
- 1957–1958 — John M. Stirling
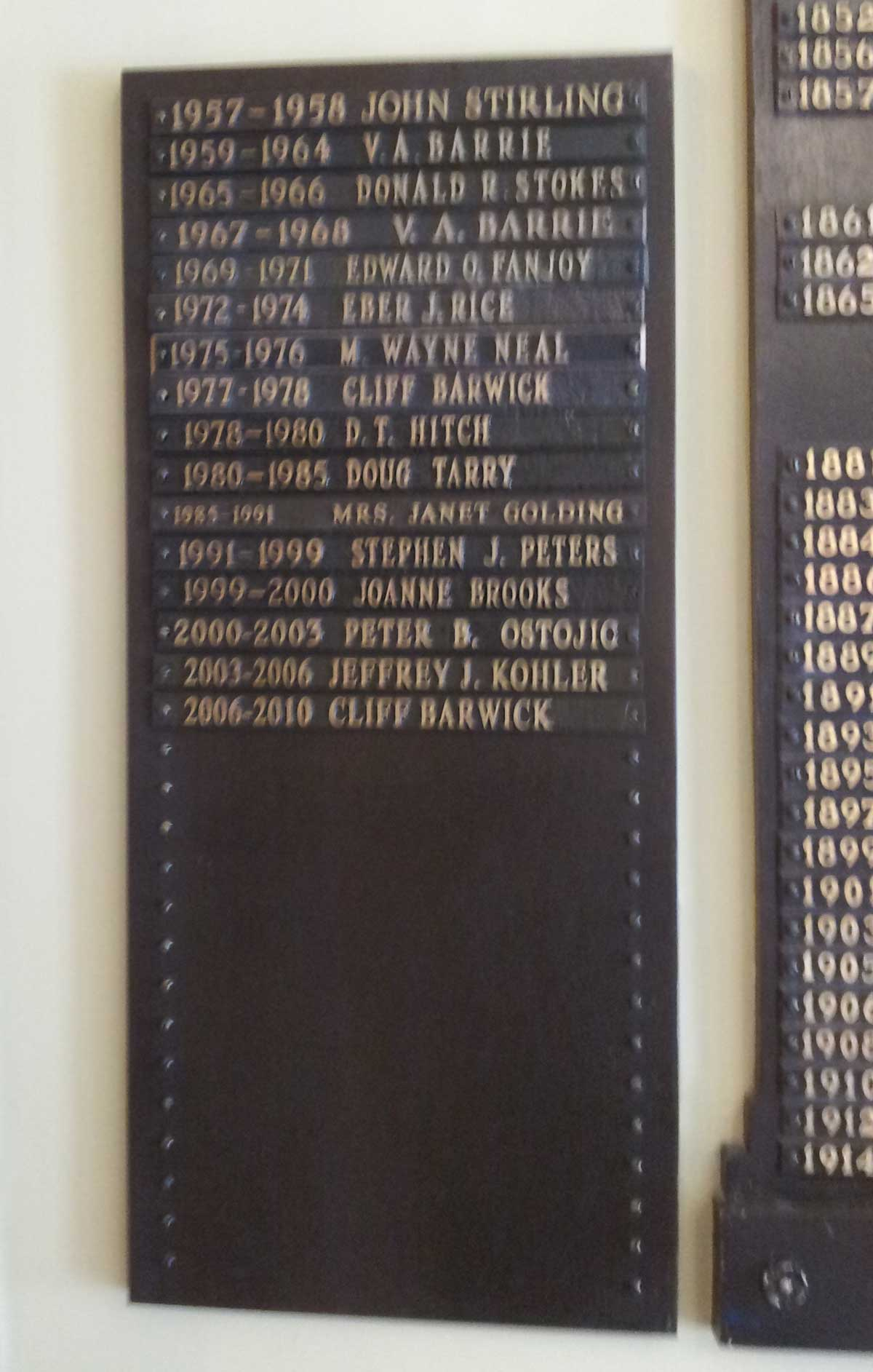
  Second Panel of Mayors & Reeves of St. Thomas, Ontario, Canada. Located in City Hall, Talbot St. St. Thomas.
- 1959–1964 — Vincent A. Barrie
- 1965–1966 — Donald R. Stokes
- 1967–1968 — Vincent A. Barrie
- 1969–1971 — Edward O. Fanjoy
- 1972–1974 — Eber J. Rice
- 1975–1976 — M. Wayne Neal
- 1977–1978 — Cliff Barwick
- 1978–1980 — Don Hitch
- 1980–1985 — Doug Tarry
- 1985–1991 — Janet Golding
- 1991–1999 — Stephen J. Peters
- 1999–2000 — Joanne Brooks
- 2000–2003 — Peter Ostojic
- 2003–2006 — Jeff Kohler
- 2006–2010 — Cliff Barwick
- 2010-2018 — Heather Jackson
- 2018-2026 — Joe Preston
- 2026-present — Jeff Kohler
