= Harold Stafford =

Canadian politician

Harold Edwin Stafford
- Official 1968 portrait

Member of Parliament for Elgin
- In office November 1965 – September 1972
- Preceded by: James Alexander McBain
- Succeeded by: John Wise

Personal details
- Born: 20 April 1921 Fredericton, New Brunswick
- Died: 18 January 2005 (aged 83)
- Party: Liberal
- Spouse: Betty Stafford
- Profession: Lawyer

Harold Edwin Stafford (20 April 1921 – 18 January 2005) was a Liberal party member of the House of Commons of Canada. He was born in Fredericton, New Brunswick and became a lawyer by career.

After two defeats at the Elgin riding in the 1962 and 1963 federal elections, Stafford was elected there in the 1965 election and re-elected in 1968. After serving two terms, the 27th and 28th Canadian Parliaments, Stafford was defeated in the 1972 election by John Wise of the Progressive Conservative party.
