= Elgin West =

Former federal electoral district in Ontario, Canada

Ontario electoral district

Defunct federal electoral district
- Legislature: House of Commons
- District created: 1867
- District abolished: 1933
- First contested: 1867
- Last contested: 1934 by-election

Elgin West was a federal electoral district represented in the House of Commons of Canada from 1867 to 1935. It was located in the province of Ontario. It was created by the British North America Act 1867 which divided the county of Elgin into two ridings: Elgin East and Elgin West based on a traditional division.

The West Riding of Elgin was redefined in 1882 to consist of the townships of Southwold, Dunwich, Alboro', Orford and Howard, and the village of Ridgetown. In 1903, it was redefined to exclude the townships of Orford and Howard, and the village of Ridgetown, and include the townships of the city of St. Thomas, and the town of Dutton. In 1914, it was redefined to include the villages of Rodney and West Lorne.

In 1924, it was defined as consisting of the county of Elgin, excluding the townships of Malahide and Bayham, and including the city of St. Thomas.

The electoral district was abolished in 1933 when it was merged into Elgin ridings.

== Members of Parliament ==
This riding has elected the following members of Parliament:

| Parliament | Years | Member | Party |
|---|---|---|---|
| 1st | 1867–1872 | John H. Munroe | Conservative |
| 2nd | 1872–1874 | George Elliott Casey | Liberal |
| 3rd | 1874–1878 | George Elliott Casey | Liberal |
| 4th | 1878–1882 | George Elliott Casey | Liberal |
| 5th | 1882–1887 | George Elliott Casey | Liberal |
| 6th | 1887–1891 | George Elliott Casey | Liberal |
| 7th | 1891–1896 | George Elliott Casey | Liberal |
| 8th | 1896–1900 | George Elliott Casey | Liberal |
| 9th | 1900–1904 | Jabel Robinson | Independent |
| 10th | 1904–1908 | William Jackson | Conservative |
| 11th | 1908–1911 | Thomas Wilson Crothers | Conservative |
| 12th | 1911–1911 | Thomas Wilson Crothers | Conservative |
| 12th | 1911–1917 | Thomas Wilson Crothers | Conservative |
| 13th | 1917–1921 | Thomas Wilson Crothers | Government (Unionist) |
| 14th | 1921–1925 | Hugh Cummings McKillop | Conservative |
| 15th | 1925–1926 | Hugh Cummings McKillop | Conservative |
| 16th | 1926–1930 | Mitchell Hepburn | Liberal |
| 17th | 1930–1934 | Mitchell Hepburn | Liberal |
| 17th | 1934–1935 | Wilson Mills | Liberal |
Riding dissolved into Elgin

== Election results ==
1867 Canadian federal election
| Party | Candidate | Votes |
|---|---|---|
| Conservative | John H. Munroe | 970 |
| Unknown | C. McDougall | 766 |
| Eligible voters | | 2,018 |
Source: Canadian Parliamentary Guide, 1871

1872 Canadian federal election
| Party | Candidate | Votes |
|---|---|---|
| Liberal | George Elliott Casey | 1,115 |
| Conservative | John H. Munroe | 1,023 |
Source: Canadian Elections Database

1874 Canadian federal election
| Party | Candidate | Votes |
|---|---|---|
| Liberal | George Elliott Casey | 1,216 |
| Unknown | E. W. Gustin | 891 |
Source: lop.parl.ca

1878 Canadian federal election
| Party | Candidate | Votes |
|---|---|---|
| Liberal | George Elliott Casey | 1,319 |
| Unknown | M. G. Munro | 1,207 |

1882 Canadian federal election
| Party | Candidate | Votes |
|---|---|---|
| Liberal | George Elliott Casey | 2,110 |
| Unknown | Alex Clark | 1,305 |

1887 Canadian federal election
| Party | Candidate | Votes |
|---|---|---|
| Liberal | George Elliott Casey | 2,351 |
| Conservative | James H. Greer | 1,519 |

1891 Canadian federal election
| Party | Candidate | Votes |
|---|---|---|
| Liberal | George Elliott Casey | 2,335 |
| Conservative | Duncan McLean | 1,653 |

1896 Canadian federal election
| Party | Candidate | Votes |
|---|---|---|
| Liberal | George Elliott Casey | 2,585 |
| Patrons of Industry | Alexander A. McKillop | 1,859 |

1900 Canadian federal election
| Party | Candidate | Votes |
|---|---|---|
| Independent | Jabel Robinson | 1,805 |
| Liberal | Angus Donald McGugan | 1,765 |
| Independent Liberal | George Elliott Casey | 1,180 |

1904 Canadian federal election
| Party | Candidate | Votes |
|---|---|---|
| Conservative | William Jackson | 3,082 |
| Liberal | Peter Stewart | 2,695 |

1908 Canadian federal election
| Party | Candidate | Votes |
|---|---|---|
| Conservative | Thomas Wilson Crothers | 3,259 |
| Liberal | William Tolmie | 2,741 |

1911 Canadian federal election
| Party | Candidate | Votes |
|---|---|---|
| Conservative | Thomas Wilson Crothers | 3,629 |
| Liberal | Donald MacNish | 2,732 |

On Mr. Crother's being appointed Minister of Labour, 10 October 191:

By-election on 27 October 1911
| Party | Candidate | Votes |
| Conservative | Thomas Wilson Crothers | acclaimed |

1917 Canadian federal election
| Party | Candidate | Votes |
|---|---|---|
| Government (Unionist) | Thomas Wilson Crothers | 5,173 |
| Opposition (Laurier Liberals) | William Tolmie | 3,526 |

1921 Canadian federal election
| Party | Candidate | Votes |
|---|---|---|
| Conservative | Hugh Cummings McKillop | 4,367 |
| Progressive | Alfred Ernest Hookway | 4,013 |
| Liberal | William Tolmie | 3,631 |

1925 Canadian federal election
| Party | Candidate | Votes |
|---|---|---|
| Conservative | Hugh C. McKillop | 8,360 |
| Liberal | George Henry Sloggett | 6,535 |

1926 Canadian federal election
| Party | Candidate | Votes |
|---|---|---|
| Liberal | Mitchell Frederick Hepburn | 7,920 |
| Conservative | Hugh Cummings McKillop | 7,742 |

1930 Canadian federal election
| Party | Candidate | Votes |
|---|---|---|
| Liberal | Mitchell Frederick Hepburn | 10,020 |
| Conservative | Jonathan Dowler | 8,583 |
Source: lop.parl.ca

On Mr. Hepburn's resignation, 8 June 1934:

By-election on 24 September 1934
| Party | Candidate | Votes |
| Liberal | Wilson Henry Mills | 9,617 |
| Conservative | Harry Clyde Borbridge | 6,724 |
| Independent | Ronald William MacDonald | 562 |

== See also ==
- List of Canadian electoral districts
- Historical federal electoral districts of Canada
