= George Elliott Casey =

Canadian politician

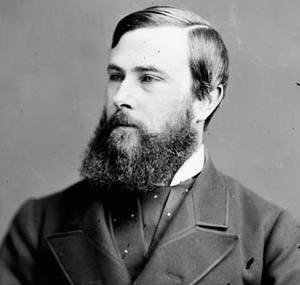
George Elliott Casey Source: Library and Archives Canada

George Elliott Casey (24 March 1850 – 30 November 1903) was a Canadian journalist and political figure from Ontario. He represented Elgin West in the House of Commons of Canada from 1872 to 1900 as a Liberal member.

He was born in Southwold Township, Canada West in 1850, the son of William Casey, an Irish immigrant, and Sarah Elliott. Casey studied at the University of Toronto. He served as chief government whip from 1874 to 1878. In 1877, he married Sarah Isabella, the daughter of James Lyons Biggar. He ran unsuccessfully as an Independent Liberal in 1900. Casey was a captain in the local militia. He also contributed to the St. Thomas Journal and the London Advertiser and served as president of the Canadian Press Association. He lived in Fingal. Casey was the driving force behind federal civil service reform aimed at reducing patronage. In 1903, he was named to the staff of the Canadian Parliamentary Library in Ottawa. He died in Ottawa at the age of 53.

Casey Township in Timiskaming District was named in his honour.

Dominic LeBlanc, son of Roméo LeBlanc and member of the House of Commons, reported that Casey was his great-great-grandfather.
