= Karen Vecchio =

Canadian politician (born 1971)

Member of Parliament for Elgin—Middlesex—London
- In office October 19, 2015 – March 23, 2025
- Preceded by: Joe Preston
- Succeeded by: Riding dissolved

Personal details
- Born: Karen Louise Martyn; March 6, 1971 (age 55) St. Thomas, Ontario, Canada
- Party: Conservative
- Spouse: Mike Vecchio (m. 2005)
- Children: 5
- Education: Georgian College; University of Western Ontario
- Profession: Executive Assistant

Karen Louise Vecchio (née Martyn; born March 6, 1971) is a Canadian politician who served as the Conservative Party Member of Parliament for Elgin—Middlesex—London from 2015 to 2025.

== Biography ==
She was raised in Sparta, Ontario. Prior to her election, Vecchio owned and operated the Coffee Grind coffee shop in London, Ontario, which she eventually sold. She then joined the New Sarum Diner in Central Elgin in a management role.

In 2004, Vecchio started working for then-Member of Parliament for Elgin—Middlesex—London, Joe Preston, eventually becoming his Executive Assistant before being elected herself.

== Political career ==
Vecchio was first elected an MP in the 2015 Canadian federal election.

In late September 2017, after Rachael Thomas was nominated by fellow Conservative MPs to be the Chair of the House Status of Women Committee, which by convention is chaired by an MP from an opposition party, Liberal and NDP members of the committee walked out of the meeting to deny quorum during which the vote to fill the Chair position would have been held, in protest of Harder's anti-abortion voting record and her previous endorsement by the Campaign Life Coalition. The following week, on October 3, the Liberals used their majority on the committee, and also with the support of the committee's only NDP MP, Sheila Malcolmson, to instead nominate and confirm Vecchio as Chair over her objections. Afterwards, Vecchio, the Conservative critic for families, children and social development, and Harder issued a joint statement accusing the Liberals of politicizing the Chair selection process and of bullying Harder as a distraction from their recent tax changes.

On July 30, 2024, Vecchio announced that she will not seek re-election in the 2025 federal election. Vecchio told the London Free Press that being apart from her family half the year and her dismissal as chair of the status of women committee were a couple of decisions why she did not seek re-election. Vecchio also told that she would not endorse any candidate in the race including the Conservative candidate, Andrew Lawton, a former broadcaster and biographer to Pierre Poilievre, by standing that she is a "grassroots conservative" who believes in local leadership while stating that Lawton had few roots to the riding. She also noted that she was on the party's centrist wing while Lawton was on its right wing.

== Election results ==
2021 Canadian federal election
Party	Candidate	Votes	%	±%	Expenditures
Conservative	Karen Vecchio	31,472	49.9	-0.3	
Liberal	Afeez Ajibowu	12,326	19.5	-3.7	
New Democratic	Katelyn Cody	10,086	16.0	-1.8	
People's	Chelsea Hillier	7,429	11.8	+10.3	
Green	Amanda Stark	1,417	2.2	-3.6	
Christian Heritage	Michael Hopkins	328	0.5		
Total valid votes		63,058			
Total rejected ballots		338	0.54	-0.22	
Turnout		63,396	65.3	-1.4	
Eligible voters		97,098			
Conservative hold		Swing		+1.7	
Source: Elections Canada

2019 Canadian federal election: Elgin—Middlesex—London
Party	Candidate	Votes	%	±%	Expenditures
Conservative	Karen Vecchio	31,026	50.2	+0.98	$87,219.85
Liberal	Pam Armstrong	14,324	23.2	-7.79	$41,162.50
New Democratic	Bob Hargreaves	11,019	17.8	+2.39	$1,633.02
Green	Ericha Hendel	3,562	5.8	+2.67	$0.00
People's	Donald Helkaa	956	1.5	-	none listed
Christian Heritage	Peter Redecop	618	1.0	+0.07	$5,961.40
Libertarian	Richard Styve	249	0.4		$468.95
Total valid votes/expense limit		61,754	100.0		
Total rejected ballots		475			
Turnout		62,229	66.7		
Eligible voters		93,347			
Conservative hold		Swing		+4.39	
Source: Elections Canada

2015 Canadian federal election: Elgin—Middlesex—London
Party	Candidate	Votes	%	±%	Expenditures
Conservative	Karen Louise Vecchio	28,023	49.22	–8.83	–
Liberal	Lori Baldwin-Sands	17,642	30.99	+17.57	–
New Democratic	Fred Sinclair	8,771	15.41	–8.67	–
Green	Bronagh Joyce Morgan	1,783	3.13	+0.11	–
Christian Heritage	Michael Hopkins	529	0.93		–
Rhinoceros	Lou Bernardi	185	0.32	–	–
Total valid votes/expense limit		56,933	100.00		$218,764.77
Total rejected ballots		230	0.40		
Turnout		57,163	68.96		
Eligible voters		82,892			
Conservative hold		Swing		–13.20	
Source: Elections Canada
