= Mitchell Hepburn =

11th Premier of Ontario

The Honourable Mitchell Hepburn
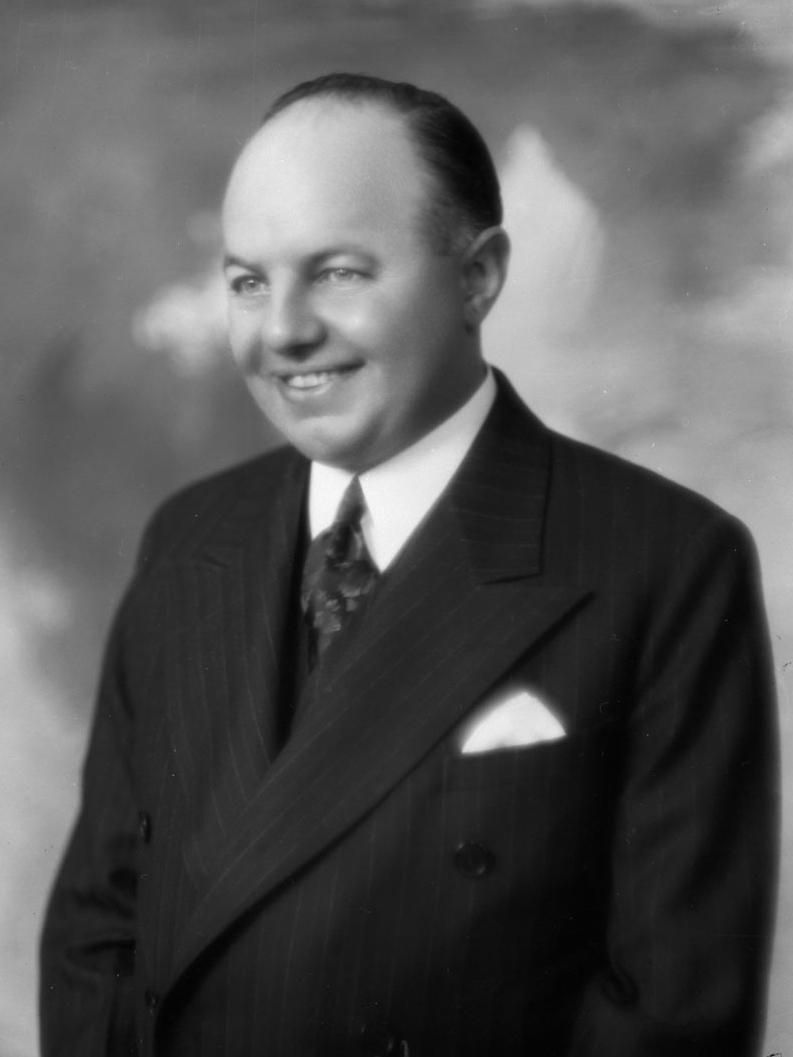
- Hepburn in 1938

11th Premier of Ontario
- In office July 10, 1934 – October 21, 1942
- Monarchs: George V Edward VIII; George VI
- Lieutenant Governor: Herbert A. Bruce; Albert E. Matthews
- Preceded by: George Stewart Henry
- Succeeded by: Gordon Daniel Conant

Member of Parliament for Elgin West
- In office September 14, 1926 – June 8, 1934
- Preceded by: Hugh Cummings McKillop
- Succeeded by: Wilson Henry Mills

MPP for Elgin
- In office June 19, 1934 – March 24, 1945
- Preceded by: New riding
- Succeeded by: Fletcher Stewart Thomas

Personal details
- Born: Mitchell Frederick Hepburn; August 12, 1896 St. Thomas, Ontario, Canada
- Died: January 5, 1953 (aged 56) St. Thomas, Ontario, Canada
- Resting place: St. Thomas Cemetery
- Party: Ontario Liberal
- Other political affiliations: United Farmers of Ontario (until 1923)
- Spouse: Eva Burton
- Relations: Peter Hepburn (1932–2015) - son

Mitchell Frederick Hepburn (August 12, 1896 – January 5, 1953) was the 11th premier of Ontario, from 1934 to 1942. He was the youngest premier in Ontario history, becoming premier at age 37. He was the only Ontario Liberal Party leader in the 20th century to lead his party to two majorities.

== Early life ==
Born in St. Thomas, Ontario, Hepburn attended school in Elgin County and hoped to become a lawyer. His formal education ended abruptly, however, when someone threw an apple at a visiting dignitary, Sir Adam Beck, and knocked his silk top hat off his head. Hepburn was accused of the deed and denied it but refused to identify the culprit. Refusing to apologize, he walked out of his high school and obtained a job as a bank clerk at the Canadian Bank of Commerce where he worked from 1913 to 1917. He eventually became an accountant at the bank's Winnipeg branch.

At the outbreak of World War I, Hepburn had already enlisted in the 34th Fort Garry Horse but was unable to obtain his parents' consent to sign up for the Canadian Expeditionary Force. He then became a lieutenant in the 25th Elgin Regiment of the Canadian Militia, and was conscripted to the 1st (Western Ontario) Battalion in 1918. He transferred to the Royal Air Force and was sent to Deseronto for training but suffered injuries in an automobile accident that summer, followed by being bedridden by the influenza in the fall, both of which kept him from active service. He returned to St. Thomas to run his family's onion farm.

== Early political career ==
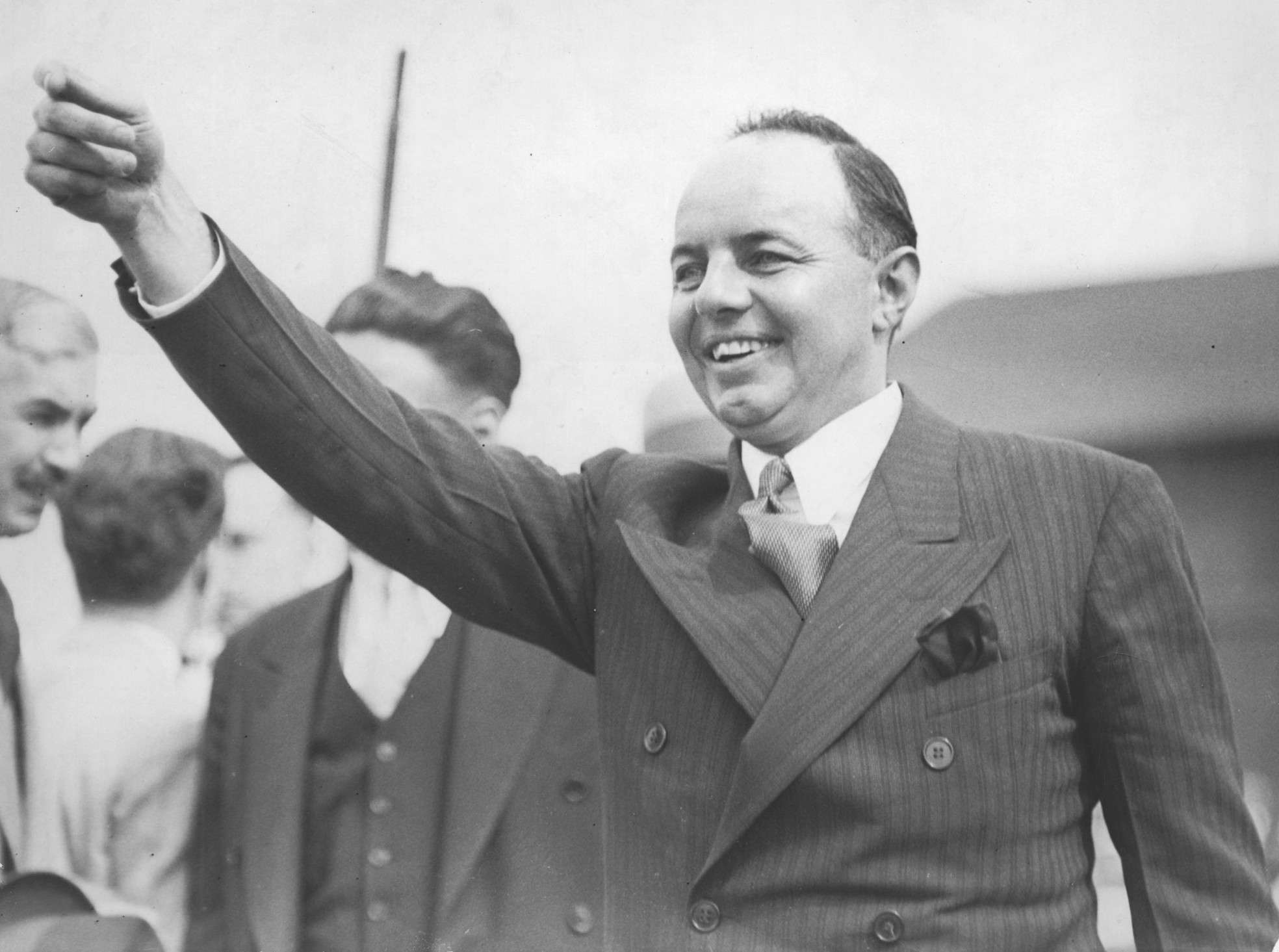
Hepburn

After the war, Hepburn joined the United Farmers of Ontario (UFO) helping to start its branch in Elgin County, but by the mid-1920s he switched to the Liberal Party. In the 1926 election, he was elected to the House of Commons of Canada as a representative of Elgin West and was overwhelmingly re-elected in the 1930 election.

Later that year he became leader of the Liberal Party of Ontario at the 1930 Ontario Liberal leadership convention. His support of farmers and free trade, and his former membership in the UFO helped him to attract Harry Nixon's rump of UFO Members of the Legislative Assembly (MLAs) into the Liberal Party (as Liberal-Progressives). This and the Great Depression led to the defeat of the unpopular Conservative premier George Stewart Henry in the 1934 provincial election. His stance against the prohibition of alcohol allowed him to break the Liberal Party from the militant prohibitionist stance that had helped reduce it to a rural, Protestant southwestern Ontario rump in the 1920s.

Hepburn represented a type of agrarian democracy that detested Toryism and valued oratory. He once saw a pile of manure situated in a village square, and proceeded to jump on top of it to give a speech, apologizing to the crowd for speaking from a Tory platform. He also used the same line when standing on a manure spreader, only to have a heckler shout, "Well, wind 'er up Mitch, because she's never carried a bigger load!"

On his death, the Toronto Star observed:

It was in the 1934 election campaign that Mr. Hepburn's gift of oratory first impinged on the province at large. He had a free and easy platform manner, his customary attitude being hands plunged in side coat pockets while he wandered about the platform releasing an unfaltering flow of barbed-wire eloquence that no other political speaker could match in rapidity and certainly not in deadliness. He never consulted a note, never appeared to prepare a speech in advance, and delivered an array of astounding facts and figures with such an air of assurance that his audience seldom thought to question them.

== Premier of Ontario ==
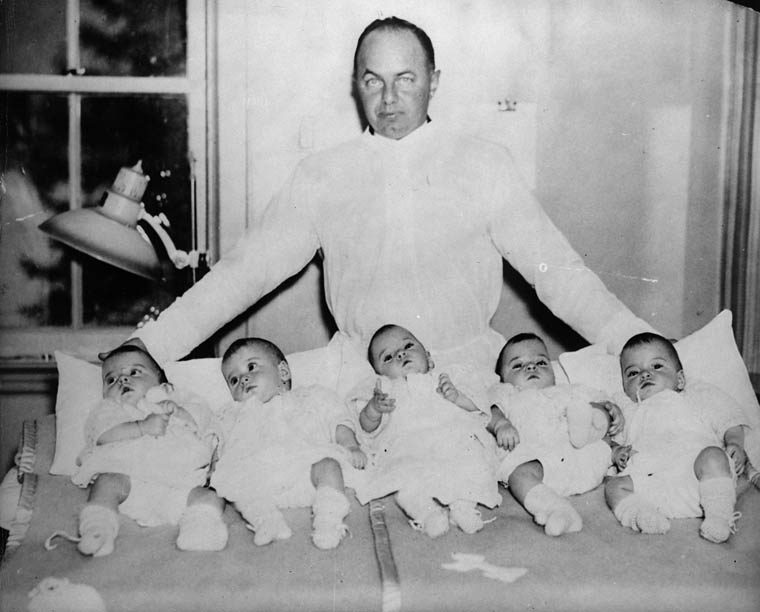
Ontario Premier Mitchell Hepburn with the Dionne quintuplets ca. 1934

Hepburn's premiership achieved international attention, which merited his appearance on Time magazine's cover in 1937.

As premier, Hepburn undertook a number of measures that enhanced his reputation as the practitioner of a highly vigorous style. In a public show of austerity, he closed Chorley Park, the residence of the Lieutenant Governor of Ontario, auctioned off the chauffeur driven limousines that had been used by the previous Conservative cabinet, and fired many civil servants. To improve the province's welfare, he gave money to mining industries in Northern Ontario and introduced compulsory milk pasteurization (in so doing, he has been credited with virtually wiping out bovine tuberculosis in the province). Breaking with the temperance stance of previous Liberal governments, Hepburn expanded the availability of liquor by allowing hotels to sell beer and wine.

=== Industrial labour reform ===
The Industrial Standards Act, which emulated the US National Industrial Recovery Act and the Quebec Arcand Act, was introduced in 1935 to set minimum wages and working conditions by industry and geographic area. It was described by Labour Minister David Croll as "the most controversial piece of legislation now on the Statute Books of the Province," and it came about after federal efforts that had been instituted under RB Bennett's "New Deal" were declared unconstitutional.

=== Guardianship of Dionne quintuplets ===
The government also made international news by making the Dionne quintuplets wards of the provincial Crown in response to public outrage of plans by promoters to exploit the infants by putting them on display at the Chicago World's Fair. The Legislative Assembly passed legislation in that regard and subsequently replaced it in 1944; it was not repealed until 2006.

The Ontario government's treatment of the Dionnes was later criticized, as the government itself (under Hepburn) relentlessly exploited the quintuplets as a tourist attraction, exhibiting them in their "home" called Quintland to hundreds of thousands of observers who passed through. The public exhibitions stopped in 1943, after Hepburn's premiership ended. The Hepburn government also set up a trust fund for the quintuplets, but in later years it was discovered that the fund contained less money than what was made from advertisements and photographs the Dionnes had been involved in. Instead of the government paying for research, food, and travel expenses for photographers and filmmakers, the payment came from the quintuplets' trust fund. Decades later, the sisters accepted a $4 million dollar settlement for their mistreatment, and an apology on behalf of the Ontario government from then-premier Mike Harris.

=== Tax collection ===
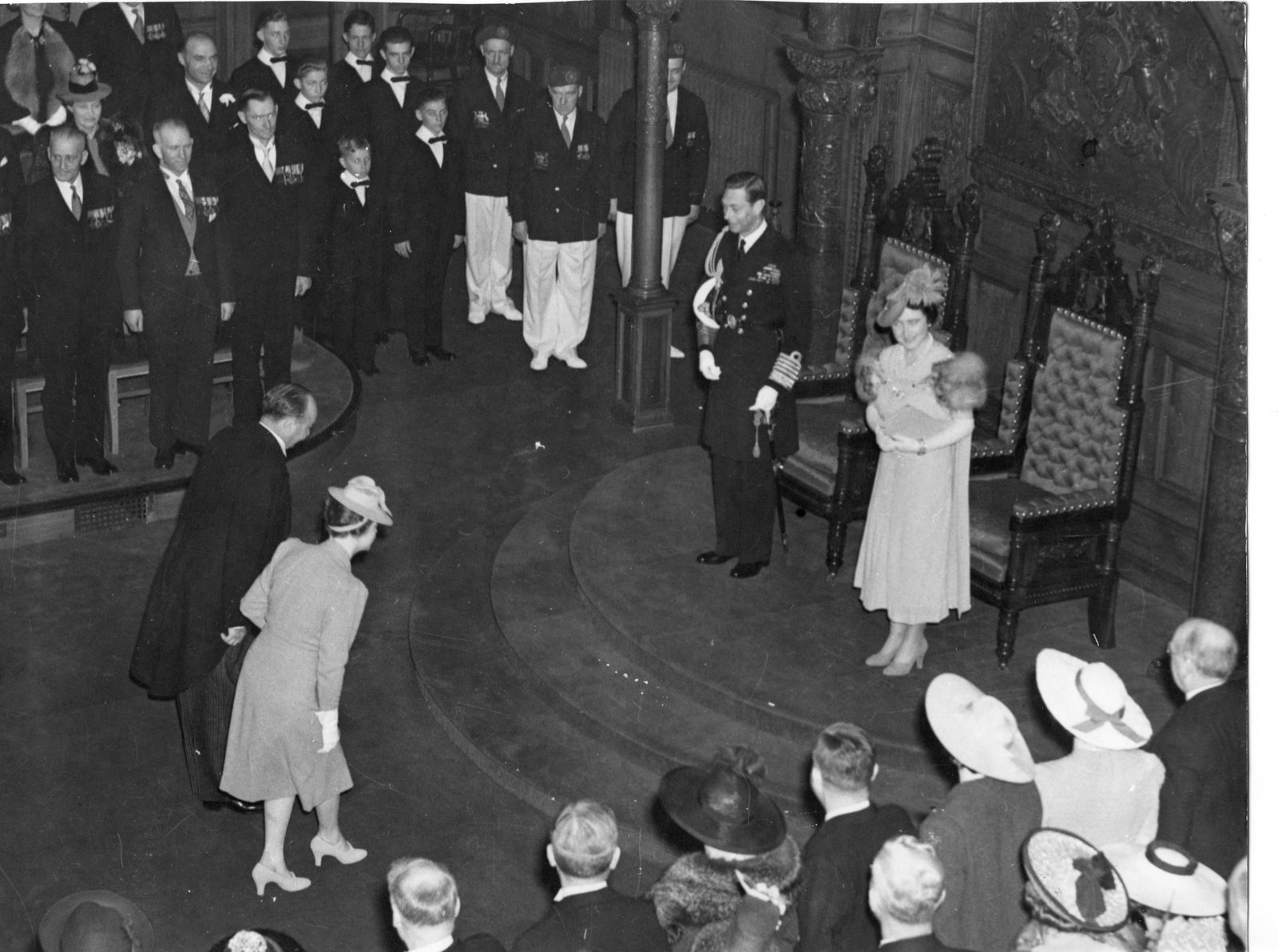
Mitchell Hepburn and wife presented to the King George VI and Queen Elizabeth during the 1939 Royal Tour.

As Treasurer of Ontario, Hepburn adopted a more aggressive approach in the collection of succession duty on large estates, which resulted in millions of dollars in extra government revenues. He made no apologies for doing so, as he noted in a speech in 1938:

That right of succession duties was conferred upon the provinces, and the drive today, emanating from the other provinces, is to get control of succession duties and place all collections under the jurisdiction of the Federal Government. If that were to happen, I can tell you, Gentlemen, I would have to impose some new taxes upon you, because I inherited a debt. You know my friend, Howard Ferguson? Bless his heart, he is a great fellow! He is a very astute man. You know he was the luckiest Premier this Province ever had. He blamed the debts which he inherited on his predecessors, he added to them and then handed them on to me. I have to meet the obligations which were handed down to me, and after I sat in his chair in Queen's Park, pinched myself a couple of times and took stock and inventory, I thought of the old adage, "Fools rush in where angels fear to tread," and some of you now who look upon me as the Tax Collector of the Province, probably use language in speaking of my methods of collection which I couldn't repeat before this august and important assembly. That is my responsibility, to meet the obligations of the Province of Ontario, to protect the interests of the Province of Ontario: That is what I am trying to do.

One estate that was of particular focus in this campaign was that of the late John Rudolphus Booth, who had died in 1925. Although succession duties of $4.28 million ($77,200,000 in current terms) were paid in 1927, Hepburn subsequently claimed more in 1937 and had the Legislative Assembly of Ontario pass the necessary legislation to overcome the legal obstacles. Booth's heirs eventually paid another $3 million ($64,000,000 in current terms) in 1939.

=== Cancellation of Hydro contracts ===
As part of his drive to cut government spending, the Power Commission Act, 1935, was passed to cancel contracts that the Hydro-Electric Power Commission of Ontario had signed between 1926 and 1930 for delivery of electricity from power plants in Quebec by declaring them to be "void and unenforceable." The move temporarily shut Ontario out of world bond markets. The Act was declared to be ultra vires by the Ontario Court of Appeal in 1937 as being legislation in derogation of extraprovincial rights (although later jurisprudence has suggested that the Court may have overreached in its rulings). Many such contracts were later renegotiated at lower volumes and prices.

=== Taking back forests ===
Hepburn took an aggressive position with respect to timber licences in Northern Ontario that were being held by companies that would (or could) not cut wood on them. In that regard, in 1936 the Forest Resources Regulation Act was passed to grant the government broad powers for mandating minimum production quotas, maximum limits in line with good forestry practice, reduce licensed acreages that were in excess of requirements, and increase stumpage fees on companies "operating or carrying on business in a manner detrimental to the public interest." Great Lakes Paper saw its holdings reduced from 23,085 square kilometres (5,704,000 acres) to 3,668 square kilometres (906,000 acres), and was assessed a $500,000 penalty ($11,100,000 in current terms) for refusing to participate in a minimum price agreement set up by the Ontario and Quebec governments.

In 1937, the Settlers' Pulpwood Protection Act was passed to govern the supply of pulpwood from private lands, together with fixing quotas and prices to be followed.

The Crown Timber Act's provisions, which had been in effect since the time of Arthur Sturgis Hardy and required logs to be manufactured as timber before they could exported from the province, were relaxed by order in council in 1936 to create employment opportunities in the logging industry.

When the Abitibi Power and Paper Company, in receivership since 1932, was ordered into liquidation in 1940, Hepburn appointed a Royal Commission to investigate the matter to determine the best course of resolution. The Legislative Assembly imposed a moratorium on liquidation proceedings in 1941, which was ultimately upheld by the Judicial Committee of the Privy Council in 1943. The Commission's recommended plan was accepted by all creditors. It would emerge from receivership in 1946, after one of the longest such receiverships in Canadian history.

=== Fight with CIO ===
In later years, Hepburn would form a Liberal–Labour alliance with the Communist Party of Canada, but as premier, he opposed unions and refused to let the CIO form unions in Ontario. On April 8, 1937, the CIO-backed General Motors plant in Oshawa went on strike and demanded an eight-hour workday, a seniority system, and the recognition of its CIO-affiliated United Auto Workers union. The strikers were also supported by the Co-operative Commonwealth Federation, which was Canada's main left-wing party. Hepburn, then professing a deep concern about radicals among auto workers, was supported by the owners of the plant and General Motors when he organized a volunteer police force to help him put down the strike after Canadian Prime Minister William Lyon Mackenzie King had refused to send the Royal Canadian Mounted Police. The force was somewhat derisively known as "Hepburn's Hussars" or the "Sons of Mitches." Cabinet ministers who disagreed with Hepburn over the issue were forced to resign. However, the strike held out, and Hepburn capitulated on April 23, 1937.

=== Conflict with Mackenzie King ===
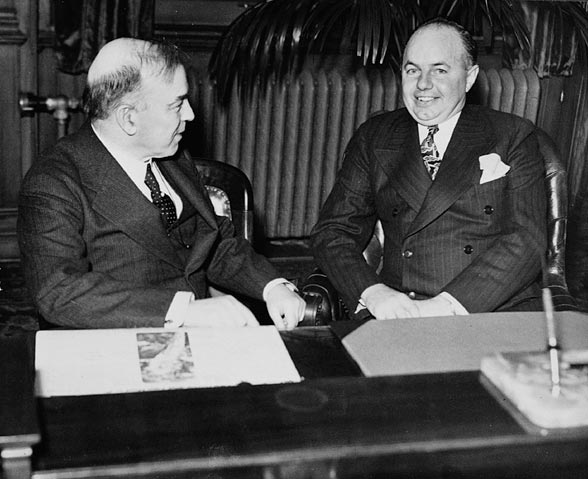
Mackenzie King and Hepburn in Hepburn's office (1934)

Hepburn remained a bitter opponent of Mackenzie King after the strike and harshly criticized King's war effort in 1940 after the outbreak of World War II had caused a resolution in the legislature to be passed 44-10 to accuse the federal government of mishandling the war effort. The Conservative opposition voted unanimously for the resolution, but the motion split the governing Liberals, with nine members of Hepburn's caucus voting against and others leaving the chamber before the vote. Hepburn, thinking that Canada should be doing more to support the war, helped to organize the military districts in Ontario and encouraged men to volunteer when Mackenzie King chose not to introduce conscription.

Hepburn supported King's opponent, Arthur Meighen, in a by-election in Toronto in 1942. Meighen's unusual source of support did not bring him to success, and he lost the by-election since the Liberals did not run a candidate, and King ordered party resources to be sent to the CCF candidate. However, King was politically much stronger than Hepburn; federal Liberal supporters, as well as those who thought an erratically driven rift between the provincial and federal parties to be suicidal, called for him to step down. Hepburn ultimately resigned as premier in October 1942 but continued to serve as Treasurer of Ontario and party leader until the following year.

== Aftermath ==
Although Gordon Daniel Conant had become premier, many people continued to think that was in name only. Senior cabinet ministers such as Provincial Secretary Harry Nixon resigned and demanded a leadership convention. Pressure from both provincial and federal Liberals caused one to be held in May 1943. Hepburn finally tendered his resignation as leader (by telegram), and Nixon was elected the new party leader and was appointed as premier.

The Liberals under Nixon were soon routed in the 1943 Ontario election and fell to third-party status, behind the Progressive Conservatives, led by George Drew, and the Co-operative Commonwealth Federation, led by Ted Jolliffe. Hepburn himself was re-elected in his riding as an Independent Liberal while he was calling for a Liberal-Conservative coalition against the burgeoning CCF. The Liberal caucus unanimously asked Hepburn to resume the party's leadership in 1944, and he was elected Acting Leader on April 2, 1945, at a joint meeting held at the King Edward Hotel of Ontario Liberal MPPs, federal Ontario Liberal MPs the party executive and other party officials in order to lead the party into the election.

Now branding Drew's Conservatives as the greatest menace to Canada, he reversed his earlier criticism of Mackenzie King's war effort and campaigned for Liberal candidate General Andrew McNaughton in a 1945 federal by-election. Provincially, his earlier vehement doubts about radicals among auto workers now muted, Hepburn formed a Liberal-Labour alliance with the Communist Party of Canada (then known as the Labor-Progressive Party) for the 1945 Ontario election but lost his own seat in the legislature.

Hepburn retired to his farm in St. Thomas, where he died of a heart attack in 1953. His funeral was attended by five former premiers, and Rev. Harry Scott Rodney observed in his eulogy:

You met him, you shook hands with him, you were warmed by his famous smile, and you heard him say, 'I'm Mitch Hepburn'; and in a few minutes you were calling him Mitch, and you liked it, and you felt you had always known him.

== Legacy ==
Hepburn's personality was complex, as The Globe and Mail noted in its obituary for him:

Warm-hearted, loyal to his friends, Mitch Hepburn was often described as a political paradox. Mistakes which would have ended the public career of other men were taken in stride. He commanded affection where others obtained only respect. He loved good times, the company of convivial friends, the telling of a good, if off-colour, story.

Hepburn was the first Liberal to become Premier since George William Ross, and was the last Liberal Premier to win two successive majority terms until Dalton McGuinty.

In 2008, he had a school named after him. Only miles away from his family's farm, Bannockburn Farms, it was officially opened in January 2009.

Parliament of Canada
Preceded by Hugh Cummings McKillop	MP for Elgin West; 1926–1934	Succeeded by Wilson Henry Mills
Legislative Assembly of Ontario
New constituency	MPP for Elgin; 1934–1945	Succeeded by Fletcher Stewart Thomas
Party political offices
Preceded by W. E. N. Sinclair	Leader of the Ontario Liberal Party; 1930–1942	Succeeded by Gordon Daniel Conant
Preceded by Harry Nixon	Leader of the Ontario Liberal Party; 1944–1945	Succeeded by Farquhar Oliver
Political offices
Preceded by George Stewart Henry	Premier of Ontario; 1934–1942	Succeeded by Gordon Daniel Conant
Preceded by George Stewart Henry	Treasurer of Ontario; 1934–1943	Succeeded by Arthur Gordon
