= Wilson Mills =

Canadian politician

Member of Parliament for Elgin West
- In office September 1934 – October 1935
- Preceded by: Mitchell Hepburn
- Succeeded by: riding dissolved

Member of Parliament for Elgin
- In office October 1935 – April 1945
- Preceded by: riding created
- Succeeded by: Charles Delmer Coyle

Personal details
- Born: Wilson Henry Mills; 10 January 1882 Sparta, Ontario
- Died: 27 March 1955 (aged 73)
- Party: Liberal
- Spouse(s): 1. Dora Sowler; m. 25 January 1905 d. Dec 1918; 2. Effie May Swayze m. 26 August 1920
- Profession: Farmer, fruit grower

Wilson Henry Mills (10 January 1882 – 27 March 1955) was a Liberal party member of the House of Commons of Canada. He was born in Sparta, Ontario and became a farmer and apple grower by career.

Mills attended schools in Elgin. He served for eight years as a municipal councillor in Sparta, Ontario and for four years as a regional councillor for Elgin County, Ontario, becoming that county's warden in 1920.

He was first elected to Parliament at the Elgin West riding in a by-election on 24 September 1934, replacing Mitchell Hepburn who resigned to run in the 1934 provincial election becoming Premier of Ontario. Mills was re-elected at Elgin in the 1935 federal election and again in 1940. After completing his term in the 19th Canadian Parliament, Mills left federal politics and did not seek another term in the 1945 election.
