= 1945 Ontario Liberal Party leadership election =

Leadership election of the Ontario Liberal Party

- Date: 2 April 1945
- Convention: King Edward Hotel, Toronto, Ontario
- Won by: Mitchell Hepburn
- Candidates: 1

The 1945 Ontario Liberal Party leadership election was held on 2 April 1945 at the King Edward Hotel in Toronto, Ontario. Former premier Mitchell Hepburn was unanimously chosen as leader of the Ontario Liberal Party at a joint meeting of Liberal Members of Provincial Parliament, Ontario Liberal Members of Parliament, party executives, and senior party officials.

The leadership selection followed the resignation of Premier and party leader Harry Nixon in December 1944. Hepburn's return to the leadership was intended to unify the Ontario Liberals before an anticipated provincial election.

The arrangement proved short-lived. Hepburn led the Liberals into the 1945 Ontario general election, where the party suffered a major defeat and Hepburn lost his own seat. He subsequently retired from politics, and Farquhar Oliver became the party's parliamentary leader.

== Background ==
The Ontario Liberal Party had governed the province for most of the period between 1934 and 1943 under Mitchell Hepburn and later Harry Nixon. However, the party was defeated in the 1943 Ontario general election, finishing third behind the Progressive Conservatives and the Co-operative Commonwealth Federation (CCF).

Nixon remained Liberal leader after the defeat but struggled to rebuild the party. On 10 December 1944 he resigned as leader and nominated Hepburn to succeed him as parliamentary leader until a formal leadership convention could be held.

As political instability increased at Queen's Park and the possibility of an election grew more likely, Liberal organizers concluded that a permanent leader would be required immediately.

== Selection process ==
Rather than holding a full delegated leadership convention, the Ontario Liberal Party convened a joint meeting of Liberal provincial and federal legislators, party executives, and other senior officials at Toronto's King Edward Hotel on 2 April 1945.

The meeting took place shortly after Premier George Drew's Progressive Conservative government had been defeated on a non-confidence motion, making a provincial election imminent.

A broader party leadership convention had originally been scheduled for 1 May 1945. However, because the province was already entering an election campaign, party officials decided to proceed immediately with Hepburn's selection and postpone formal ratification.

Hepburn was chosen without opposition and received unanimous backing from those present.

== Leadership ==
Hepburn's return marked his second tenure as Ontario Liberal leader. He had previously served as party leader and Premier from 1934 until 1942.

His selection was intended to reunite the party's various factions and capitalize on his continuing public profile. Despite having resigned as premier three years earlier, Hepburn remained the best-known Liberal politician in Ontario.

Contemporary critics, however, argued that the decision demonstrated the party's inability to develop a new generation of leadership. One editorial in The Globe and Mail described the move as evidence of organizational weakness within the Ontario Liberal Party.

== Aftermath ==
The anticipated formal leadership convention never took place because the provincial election campaign was already underway.

In the 1945 Ontario general election, held on 4 June 1945, the Liberals won only 12 seats and remained well behind Drew's Progressive Conservatives. Hepburn himself was defeated in the constituency of Elgin.

Following the election defeat, Hepburn retired from provincial politics. On 4 July 1945, Liberal Members of Provincial Parliament selected Farquhar Oliver as parliamentary leader, beginning a transition period that eventually culminated in the party's next formal leadership convention.

Historians have generally viewed Hepburn's brief second leadership as an attempt to revive the political coalition that had brought the Liberals to power in 1934. The effort failed, however, as Ontario politics increasingly became polarized between Drew's Progressive Conservatives and Ted Jolliffe's CCF.
