= Elgin (federal electoral district) =

Former federal electoral district in Ontario, Canada

Ontario electoral district

Defunct federal electoral district
- Legislature: House of Commons
- District created: 1933
- District abolished: 1996
- First contested: 1935
- Last contested: 1993

Elgin (also known as Elgin—Norfolk) was a federal electoral district represented in the House of Commons of Canada from 1935 to 1997. It was located in the province of Ontario. This riding was created in 1933 from parts of Elgin West and Norfolk—Elgin ridings.

It initially consisted of the county of Elgin, including the city of St. Thomas. In 1966, it was redefined to consist of the County of Elgin and the Village of Belmont in the County of Middlesex. In 1987, it was redefined to consist of the County of Elgin and the Township of Norfolk in the Regional Municipality of Haldimand-Norfolk.

The name of electoral district was changed in 1990 to Elgin—Norfolk.

The electoral district was abolished in 1996 when it was redistributed between Elgin—Middlesex—London and Haldimand—Norfolk—Brant ridings.

== Members of Parliament ==
This riding has elected the following members of Parliament:

Parliament	Years	Member	Party
Elgin; Riding created from Elgin West and Norfolk—Elgin
18th	1935–1940	Wilson Mills	Liberal
19th	1940–1945	Wilson Mills	Liberal
20th	1945–1949	Charles Delmer Coyle	Progressive Conservative
21st	1949–1953	Charles Delmer Coyle	Progressive Conservative
22nd	1953–1954†	Charles Delmer Coyle	Progressive Conservative
22nd	1954–1957	James Alexander McBain	Progressive Conservative
23rd	1957–1958	James Alexander McBain	Progressive Conservative
24th	1958–1962	James Alexander McBain	Progressive Conservative
25th	1962–1963	James Alexander McBain	Progressive Conservative
26th	1963–1965	James Alexander McBain	Progressive Conservative
27th	1965–1968	Harold Stafford	Liberal
28th	1968–1972	Harold Stafford	Liberal
29th	1972–1974	John Wise	Progressive Conservative
30th	1974–1979	John Wise	Progressive Conservative
31st	1979–1980	John Wise	Progressive Conservative
32nd	1980–1984	John Wise	Progressive Conservative
33rd	1984–1988	John Wise	Progressive Conservative
34th	1988–1993	Ken Monteith	Progressive Conservative
Elgin—Norfolk
35th	1993–1997	Gar Knutson	Liberal
Riding dissolved into Elgin—Middlesex—London and Haldimand—Norfolk—Brant

== Election results ==
=== Elgin ===
1935 Canadian federal election
Party	Candidate	Votes
Liberal	Wilson Mills	11,295
Conservative	Herbert James Davis	9,508
Reconstruction	John Lawrence Stansell	1,793

1940 Canadian federal election
Party	Candidate	Votes
Liberal	Wilson Mills	11,867
National Government	Norman Roy Martin	8,905

1945 Canadian federal election
Party	Candidate	Votes
Progressive Conservative	Charles Delmer Coyle	11,652
Liberal	Gordon Newell	7,484
Co-operative Commonwealth	Peter Laing	2,397

1949 Canadian federal election
Party	Candidate	Votes
Progressive Conservative	Charles Delmer Coyle	10,265
Liberal	Gordon Newell	9,085
Co-operative Commonwealth	Colin Charles Stafford	1,783

1953 Canadian federal election
Party	Candidate	Votes
Progressive Conservative	Charles Delmer Coyle	12,482
Liberal	John Frederick Peterson	10,743

On Mr. Coyle's death, 19 January 1954:

By-election on 22 March 1954
Party	Candidate	Votes
Progressive Conservative	James Alexander McBain	11,821
Liberal	Harold Scott Rodney	10,680

1957 Canadian federal election
Party	Candidate	Votes
Progressive Conservative	James Alexander McBain	14,822
Liberal	James Carman Hindley	7,280
Social Credit	Frank H. Whatmore	1,407
Co-operative Commonwealth	Lloyd George Allen	1,233

1958 Canadian federal election
Party	Candidate	Votes
Progressive Conservative	James Alexander McBain	17,146
Liberal	Peter Laing	6,656
Co-operative Commonwealth	Lloyd Allen	1,008
Social Credit	Harold G. Youcke	252

1962 Canadian federal election
Party	Candidate	Votes
Progressive Conservative	James Alexander McBain	12,569
Liberal	Harold Edwin Stafford	12,491
New Democratic	Stuart Henry Phoenix	1,936
Social Credit	Richard Orval Tustian	622

1963 Canadian federal election
Party	Candidate	Votes
Progressive Conservative	James Alexander McBain	13,957
Liberal	Harold Stafford	12,910
New Democratic	Harold Nathaniel Brooks	1,127
Social Credit	Kenneth E. Shackleton	757

1965 Canadian federal election
Party	Candidate	Votes
Liberal	Harold Stafford	13,343
Progressive Conservative	James Alexander McBain	12,309
New Democratic	Eric Dennis Hargreaves	1,530
Social Credit	Clare Inger	520

1968 Canadian federal election
Party	Candidate	Votes
Liberal	Harold Stafford	12,856
Progressive Conservative	John S. Ker	11,799
New Democratic	Barry P. Whittaker	4,227

1972 Canadian federal election
Party	Candidate	Votes
Progressive Conservative	John Wise	17,281
Liberal	Harold Stafford	13,289
New Democratic	Leroy B. Wright	3,345

1974 Canadian federal election
Party	Candidate	Votes
Progressive Conservative	John Wise	15,851
Liberal	Marietta Roberts	13,349
New Democratic	Bob McNaughton	4,373
Social Credit	William Triska	126

1979 Canadian federal election
Party	Candidate	Votes
Progressive Conservative	John Wise	21,181
Liberal	Joe Tokar	9,273
New Democratic	Mary Lou Weitzel	4,293

1980 Canadian federal election
Party	Candidate	Votes
Progressive Conservative	John Wise	16,845
Liberal	Gary Johnson	12,410
New Democratic	Mary Lou Weitzel	4,508
Marxist–Leninist	Roger Beland	57

1984 Canadian federal election
Party	Candidate	Votes
Progressive Conservative	John Wise	23,302
Liberal	Gary Johnson	6,797
New Democratic	Bob Habkirk	4,646

1988 Canadian federal election
Party	Candidate	Votes
Progressive Conservative	Ken Monteith	15,694
Liberal	Tony Csinos	13,953
New Democratic	Bob Habkirk	8,447
Christian Heritage	Will Wymenga	2,529

=== Elgin—Norfolk ===
1993 Canadian federal election
Party	Candidate	Votes
Liberal	Gar Knutson	17,438
Progressive Conservative	Ken Monteith	11,118
Reform	John Van der Veen	8,236
New Democratic	Bob Habkirk	2,168
Christian Heritage	Bob A. Dekraker	1,263
Natural Law	Rod Falk	242
Abolitionist	Mai Ly	51

== See also ==
- List of Canadian electoral districts
- Historical federal electoral districts of Canada
