= Gar Knutson =

Canadian politician and lawyer

The Honourable Gar Knutson PC, LLB, MBA

Secretary of State for Central and Eastern Europe and the Middle East
- In office 2002–2003
- Preceded by: New position
- Succeeded by: Position abolished

Minister of State for New and Emerging Markets
- In office 2003–2004
- Preceded by: New position
- Succeeded by: position abolished

Parliamentary Secretary to the Prime Minister
- In office 1998–2000
- Preceded by: Rey Pagtakhan
- Succeeded by: Joe Jordan

Member of Parliament for Elgin—Norfolk
- In office 1993–1996
- Preceded by: Ken Monteith
- Succeeded by: Riding abolished

Member of Parliament for Elgin—Middlesex—London
- In office 1996–2004
- Preceded by: New riding
- Succeeded by: Joe Preston

Personal details
- Born: May 4, 1956 (age 70) Toronto, Ontario
- Party: Liberal
- Profession: lawyer

Thomas Garfield "Gar" Knutson, PC (born May 4, 1956) is a lawyer and former member of the Parliament of Canada, as well as a former Cabinet Minister in the Government of Canada.

Gar Knutson holds a Master of Business Administration (MBA) degree from the Richard Ivey School of Business at the University of Western Ontario, as well as a B.A. in history. Following University, Gar graduated with a Bachelor of Laws (LL.B) degree from the University of Windsor. He attended high school at the Jesuit Brebeuf College School in Toronto.

In the 1993 federal election, he was elected to the House of Commons of Canada as the Member of Parliament (MP) for Elgin—Norfolk riding as a candidate representing the Liberal Party. He was re-elected in the 1997 and 2000 elections to the re-organized riding of Elgin—Middlesex—London.

He served as Parliamentary Secretary to Prime Minister Jean Chrétien from 2000 to 2002. In 2002, he was named Secretary of State for Central and Eastern Europe and the Middle East, and served as Minister of State for International Trade from 2003 to 2004 under Prime Minister Paul Martin. Gar was defeated by the Elgin-Middlesex-London Conservative candidate Joe Preston in the 2004 election. Shortly afterwards, Knutson joined Borden Ladner Gervais LLP, Canada's largest law firm, practicing in the area of government relations and public policy. Knutson spent 13 years at Borden Ladner Gervais LLP, from 2005 to 2018, leaving to start his own boutique law firm, Knutson Law.

Knutson attempted to stage a political comeback in the 2007 Federal Liberal nomination in the riding of Ottawa—Orléans, but lost to former MP Marc Godbout.
