= Ken Monteith =

Canadian politician (1938–2023)

Ken Monteith MP

Member of Parliament for Elgin
- In office 1988–1993
- Preceded by: John Wise
- Succeeded by: Gar Knutson

Reeve of Southwold Township, Ontario
- In office 1980–1980

Deputy Reeve of Southwold Township, Ontario
- In office 1978–1980

Councillor of Southwold Township, Ontario
- In office 1978–1980

Personal details
- Born: Kenneth Ernest Monteith; 26 June 1938 St. Thomas, Ontario, Canada
- Died: 3 February 2023 (aged 84) St. Thomas, Ontario, Canada
- Party: Progressive Conservative
- Education: Ontario Agricultural College (Ridgetown College) 1957
- Profession: farmer

Kenneth Ernest Monteith (26 June 1938 – 3 February 2023) was a Canadian politician who was a member of the House of Commons from 1988 to 1993. His background was in agriculture.

Monteith was born in St. Thomas, Ontario in 1938. He was elected in the 1988 federal election at the Elgin electoral district for the Progressive Conservative party. He served in the 34th Canadian Parliament but lost to Gar Knutson of the Liberal Party in the 1993 federal election when it was renamed Elgin—Norfolk.

Prior to being an MP, Monteith served in municipal roles:

- Deputy Reeve of Southwold Township, Ontario – 1978–1980
- Township Councillor of Southwold Township, Ontario – 1978–1980
- Reeve of Southwold Township, Ontario – 1980

Monteith died in St. Thomas on 3 February 2023 at the age of 84.
