= Charles Delmer Coyle =

Canadian politician (1887–1954)

Member of Parliament for Elgin
- In office 1945 – January 1954
- Preceded by: Wilson Henry Mills
- Succeeded by: James Alexander McBain

Personal details
- Born: September 16, 1887 Kinglake, Ontario
- Died: January 19, 1954 (aged 66)
- Party: Progressive Conservative
- Profession: farmer

Charles Delmer Coyle (September 16, 1887 – January 19, 1954) was a Canadian Member of Parliament for the federal riding of Elgin from 1945 to 1954. Born in Kinglake, Ontario, Coyle was a member of the Progressive Conservative Party of Canada. Prior to his election to Parliament, Coyle was a tobacco farmer, councillor for Straffordville (1925-1928), deputy reeve (1929-1930) and reeve of Bayham Township (1931–33 and 1943–1945).
