= Elgin—Middlesex—London (federal electoral district) =

Federal electoral district in Ontario, Canada

Coordinates: 42.78°N 81.21°W

Ontario electoral district
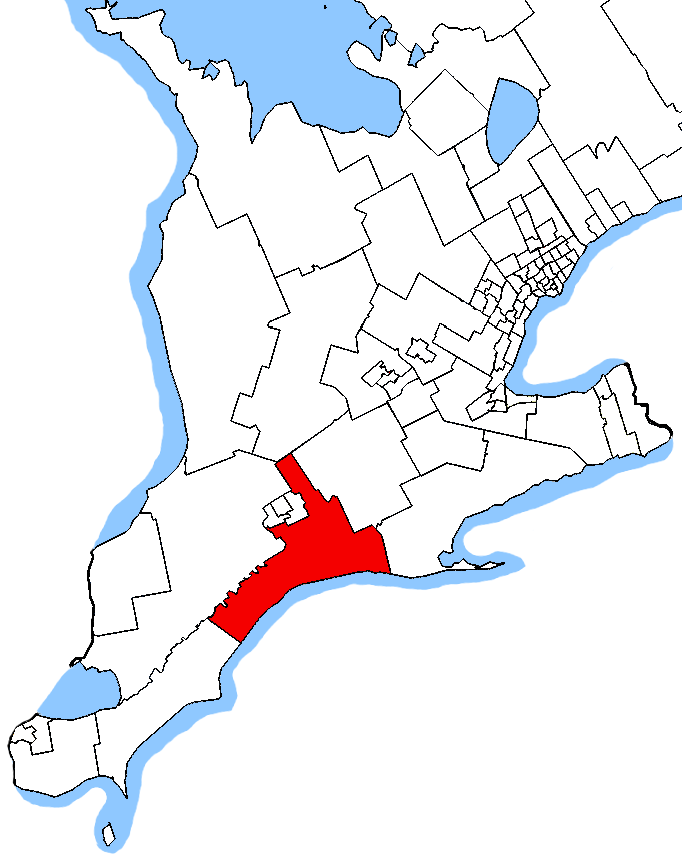
- Elgin—Middlesex—London in relation to other southern Ontario electoral districts

Defunct federal electoral district
- Legislature: House of Commons
- District created: 1996
- District abolished: 2023
- First contested: 1997
- Last contested: 2021
- District webpage: profile, map

Demographics
- Population (2011): 110,109
- Electors (2015): 82,062
- Area (km²): 2,640
- Census division(s): Elgin, Middlesex
- Census subdivision(s): Aylmer, Bayham, Central Elgin, Dutton/Dunwich, London, Malahide, Southwold, St. Thomas, Thames Centre, West Elgin

Elgin—Middlesex—London is a federal electoral district in Ontario, Canada, that has been represented in the House of Commons of Canada since 1997.

It was created in 1996 from Elgin—Norfolk, Lambton—Middlesex, and London—Middlesex ridings. This riding lost territory to London—Fanshawe during the 2012 electoral redistribution.

Under the 2022 Canadian federal electoral redistribution the riding will be largely replaced by Elgin—St. Thomas—London South. Smaller parts will move to Middlesex—London.

== Demographics ==
According to the 2021 Canadian census

Languages: 84.1% English, 2.9% German, 1.8% Plautdietsch

Religions: 59.0% Christian (17.9% Catholic, 8.7% United Church, 4.2% Anglican, 3.3% Baptist, 2.8% Anabaptist, 2.3% Presbyterian, 1.1% Reformed, 1.0% Pentecostal, 17.7% other), 2.6% Muslim, 36.7% none

Median income: $42,400 (2020)

Average income: $51,250 (2020)

Panethnic groups in Elgin—Middlesex—London (2011−2021)
Panethnic group	2021		2016		2011	
Panethnic group	Pop.	%	Pop.	%	Pop.	%
European (Note: Statistic includes all persons that did not make up part of a visible minority or an indigenous identity.)	111,815	89.87%	106,115	93.56%	102,850	95.05%
Indigenous	2,425	1.95%	2,230	1.97%	1,775	1.64%
Middle Eastern (Note: Statistic includes total responses of "West Asian" and "Arab" under visible minority section on census.)	2,410	1.94%	925	0.82%	625	0.58%
South Asian	2,320	1.86%	760	0.67%	595	0.55%
African	1,815	1.46%	890	0.78%	515	0.48%
Southeast Asian (Note: Statistic includes total responses of "Filipino" and "Southeast Asian" under visible minority section on census.)	1,225	0.98%	815	0.72%	765	0.71%
Latin American	950	0.76%	555	0.49%	350	0.32%
East Asian (Note: Statistic includes total responses of "Chinese", "Korean", and "Japanese" under visible minority section on census.)	870	0.7%	650	0.57%	595	0.55%
Other/multiracial (Note: Statistic includes total responses of "Visible minority, n.i.e." and "Multiple visible minorities" under visible minority section on census.)	595	0.48%	485	0.43%	135	0.12%
Total responses	124,420	98.41%	113,415	98.58%	108,205	98.27%
Total population	126,428	100%	115,052	100%	110,109	100%
Notes: Totals greater than 100% due to multiple origin responses. Demographics based on 2012 Canadian federal electoral redistribution riding boundaries.

== Members of Parliament ==
This riding has elected the following members of Parliament:

Parliament	Years	Member	Party
Elgin—Middlesex—London; Riding created from Elgin—Norfolk, Lambton—Middlesex and London—Middlesex
36th	1997–2000	Gar Knutson	Liberal
37th	2000–2004	Gar Knutson	Liberal
38th	2004–2006	Joe Preston	Conservative
39th	2006–2008	Joe Preston	Conservative
40th	2008–2011	Joe Preston	Conservative
41st	2011–2015	Joe Preston	Conservative
42nd	2015–2019	Karen Vecchio	Conservative
43rd	2019–2021	Karen Vecchio	Conservative
44th	2021–2025	Karen Vecchio	Conservative
Riding dissolved into Elgin—St. Thomas—London South and Middlesex—London

== Election results ==
View source data.
Graph of election results in Elgin—Middlesex—London (minor parties that never got 2% of the vote or didn't run consistently are omitted)

2021 Canadian federal election
Party	Candidate	Votes	%	±%	Expenditures
Conservative	Karen Vecchio	31,472	49.9	-0.3	$102,347.57
Liberal	Afeez Ajibowu	12,326	19.5	-3.7	$14,478.23
New Democratic	Katelyn Cody	10,086	16.0	-1.8	$2,164.43
People's	Chelsea Hillier	7,429	11.8	+10.3	none listed
Green	Amanda Stark	1,417	2.2	-3.6	$2,383.93
Christian Heritage	Michael Hopkins	328	0.5	–	$0.00
Total valid votes/expense limit		63,058	–	–	$124,204.20
Turnout		63,396	65.3	-1.4	
Eligible voters		97,098			
Conservative hold		Swing		+1.7	
Source: Elections Canada

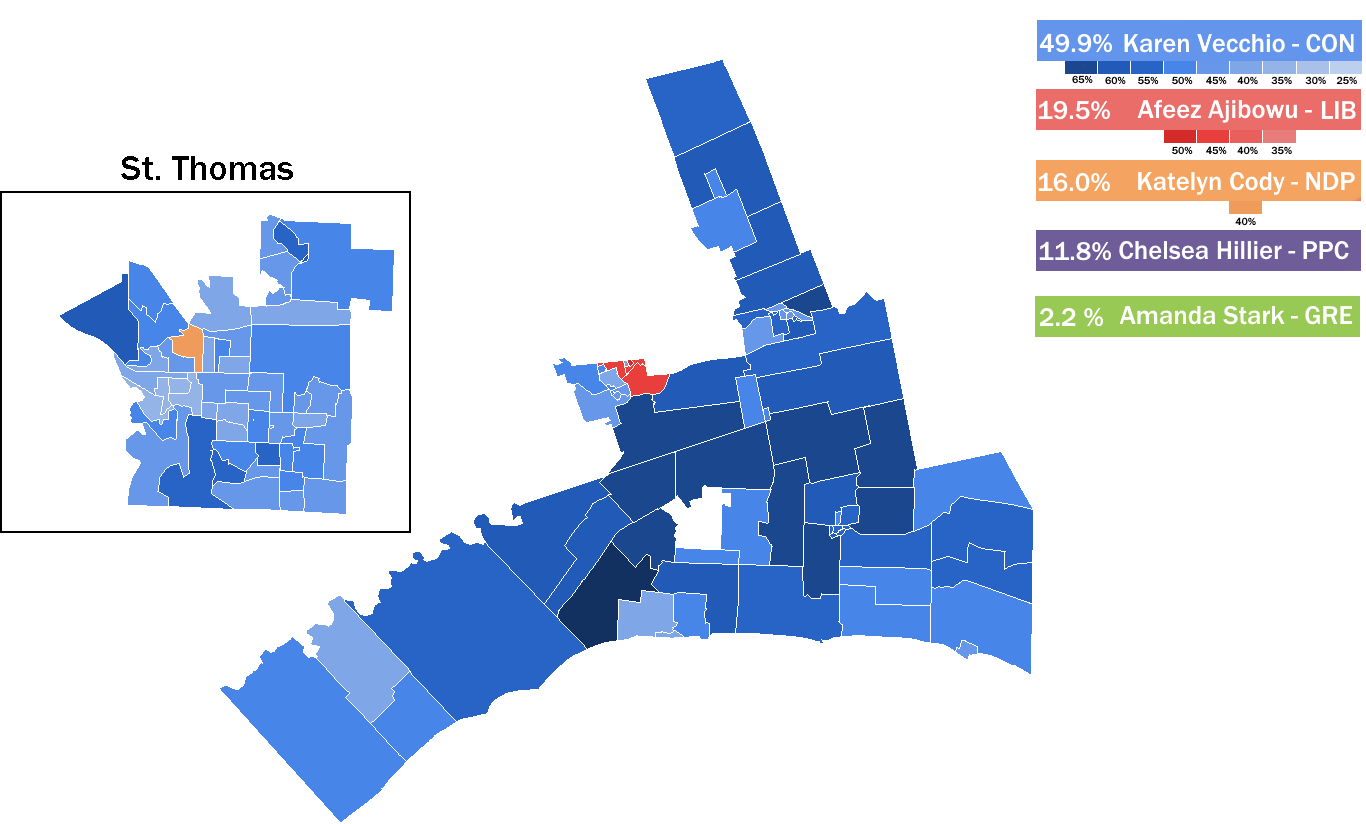
2021 Results by election day polling stations

2019 Canadian federal election
Party	Candidate	Votes	%	±%	Expenditures
Conservative	Karen Vecchio	31,026	50.2	+0.98	$87,219.85
Liberal	Pam Armstrong	14,324	23.2	-7.79	$41,162.50
New Democratic	Bob Hargreaves	11,019	17.8	+2.39	$1,633.02
Green	Ericha Hendel	3,562	5.8	+2.67	$0.00
People's	Donald Helkaa	956	1.5	-	none listed
Christian Heritage	Peter Redecop	618	1.0	+0.07	$5,961.40
Libertarian	Richard Styve	249	0.4		$468.95
Total valid votes/expense limit		61,754	100.0		
Total rejected ballots		475			
Turnout		62,229	66.7		
Eligible voters		93,347			
Conservative hold		Swing		+4.39	
Source: Elections Canada

2015 Canadian federal election
Party	Candidate	Votes	%	±%	Expenditures
Conservative	Karen Louise Vecchio	28,023	49.22	–8.83	–
Liberal	Lori Baldwin-Sands	17,642	30.99	+17.57	–
New Democratic	Fred Sinclair	8,771	15.41	–8.67	–
Green	Bronagh Joyce Morgan	1,783	3.13	+0.11	–
Christian Heritage	Michael Hopkins	529	0.93		–
Rhinoceros	Lou Bernardi	185	0.32	–	–
Total valid votes/expense limit		56,933	100.00		$218,764.77
Total rejected ballots		230	0.40		
Turnout		57,163	68.96		
Eligible voters		82,892			
Conservative hold		Swing		–13.20	
Source: Elections Canada

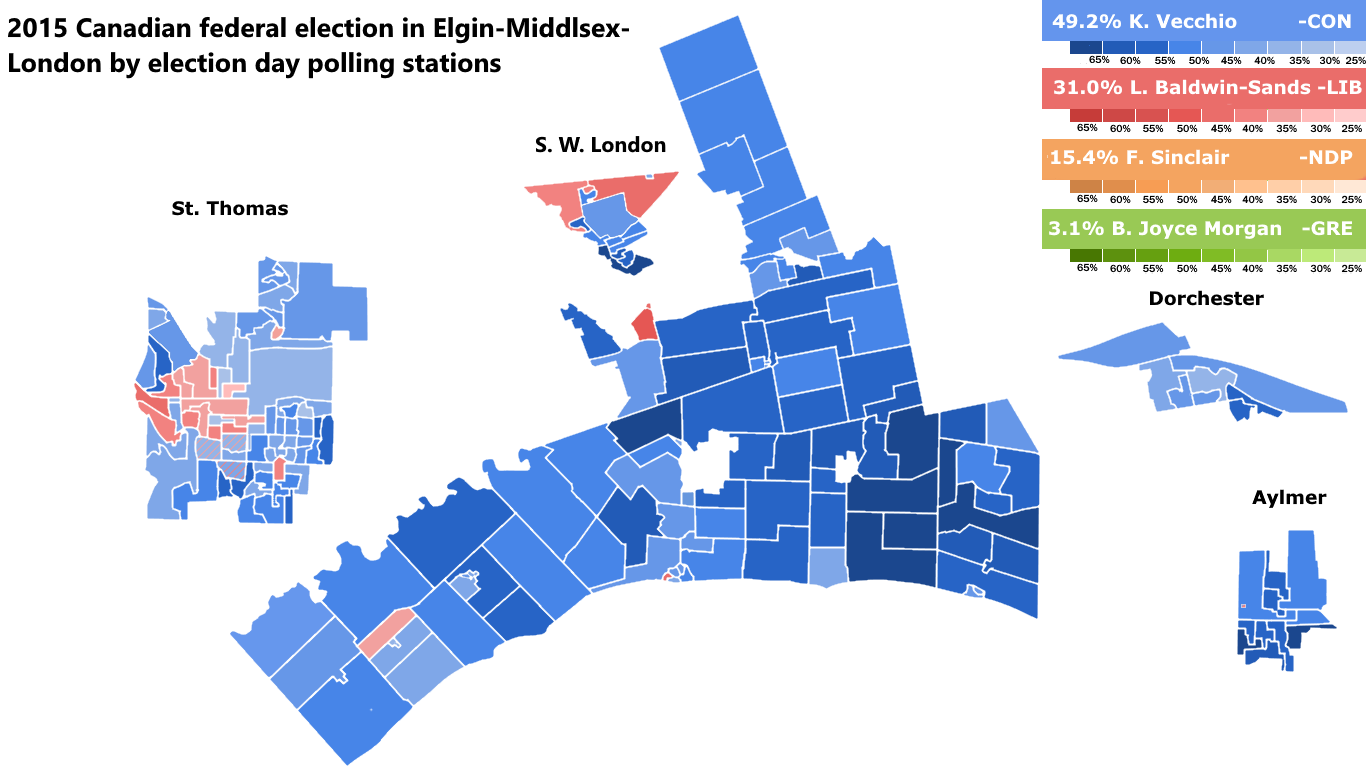
2015 Results by election day polling stations

2011 federal election redistributed results
Party	Vote	%
Conservative	28,387	58.05
New Democratic	11,774	24.08
Liberal	6,559	13.41
Green	1,478	3.02
Others	701	1.43

2011 Canadian federal election
Party	Candidate	Votes	%	±%	Expenditures
Conservative	Joe Preston	29,147	57.55	+9.17	–
New Democratic	Fred Sinclair	12,439	24.56	+5.32	–
Liberal	Graham Warwick	6,812	13.45	-10.07	–
Green	John Fisher	1,529	3.02	-3.80	–
Christian Heritage	Carl Hiemstra	582	1.15	-0.15	–
Canadian Action	Will Arlow	140	0.28	+0.08	–
Total valid votes		50,649	100.00	–	
Total rejected ballots		170	0.33	-0.07	
Turnout		50,819	62.90	+3.24	
Eligible voters		80,796	–	–	

2008 Canadian federal election
Party	Candidate	Votes	%	±%	Expenditures
Conservative	Joe Preston	22,970	48.38	+2.8	$77,732
Liberal	Suzanne van Bommel	11,169	23.52	-2.8	$79,198
New Democratic	Ryan Dolby	9,135	19.24	0.0	$12,502
Green	Noel Burgon	3,241	6.82	+1.2	
Christian Heritage	Carl Hiemstra	619	1.30	-0.7	$9,598
Independent	Michael van Holst	243	0.51	–	$1,875
Canadian Action	Will Arlow	96	0.20	0.0	
Total valid votes/expense limit		47,473	100.0	$85,544	
Total rejected ballots		190	0.40		
Turnout		47,663	59.66		

2006 Canadian federal election
Party	Candidate	Votes	%	±%
Conservative	Joe Preston	23,416	45.6	+1.8
Liberal	Crispin Colvin	13,507	26.3	-7.9
New Democratic	Tim McCallum	9,873	19.2	+4.6
Green	Jonathan Martyn	2,878	5.6	+1.2
Christian Heritage	Ken DeVries	1,049	2.0	-0.7
Progressive Canadian	Phill Borm	504	1.0	
Canadian Action	Will Arlow	105	0.2	-0.1
Total valid votes		51,332	100.0	

2004 Canadian federal election
Party	Candidate	Votes	%	±%
Conservative	Joe Preston	20,333	43.8	-8.7
Liberal	Gar Knutson	15,860	34.2	-6.2
New Democratic	Tim McCallum	6,763	14.6	+9.4
Green	Julie-Ann Stodolny	2,033	4.4	+3.4
Christian Heritage	Ken DeVries	1,246	2.7	+1.8
Canadian Action	Will Arlow	146	0.3	
Total valid votes		46,381	100.0	

Note: Conservative vote is compared to the total of the Canadian Alliance vote and Progressive Conservative vote in 2000 election.

2000 Canadian federal election
Party	Candidate	Votes	%	±%
Liberal	Gar Knutson	17,890	40.4	+0.4
Alliance	Bill Walters	17,202	38.8	+15.8
Progressive Conservative	Delia Reiche	6,080	13.7	-12.0
New Democratic	Tim McCallum	2,319	5.2	-2.1
Green	John R. Fisher	431	1.0	-0.2
Independent	Ken DeVries	407	0.9	-1.9
Total valid votes		44,329	100.0	

Note: Canadian Alliance vote is compared to the Reform vote in 1997 election.

1997 Canadian federal election
Party	Candidate	Votes	%
Liberal	Gar Knutson	17,890	40.0
Progressive Conservative	Luella Watson	11,499	25.7
Reform	John Van Der Veen	10,307	23.0
New Democratic	Cynthia Nurse	3,260	7.3
Christian Heritage	Ron Steenbergen	1,275	2.8
Green	John R. Fisher	508	1.1
Total valid votes		44,739	100.0

== See also ==
- List of Canadian electoral districts
- Historical federal electoral districts of Canada
