= James Alexander McBain =

Canadian politician

Member of Parliament for Elgin
- In office March 1954 – September 1965
- Preceded by: Charles Delmer Coyle
- Succeeded by: Harold Stafford

Personal details
- Born: 30 May 1910 St. Thomas, Ontario, Canada
- Died: 11 August 1988 (aged 78)
- Party: Progressive Conservative
- Profession: farmer

James Alexander McBain (30 May 1910 – 11 August 1988) was a Progressive Conservative party member of the House of Commons of Canada. He was born in St. Thomas, Ontario and became a farmer by career.

McBain held municipal office in Ontario's Yarmouth Township in Elgin County first as a councillor in 1940, then as Deputy Reeve from 1945, then was township Reeve in 1947 and 1948.

He was elected to Parliament at the Elgin riding in a 22 March 1954 by-election, then re-elected there for general elections in 1957, 1958, 1962 and 1963. McBain was defeated by Harold Stafford of the Liberal party in the 1965 federal election.

From August 1962 to February 1963, McBain served as Parliamentary Secretary to the Minister of Transport.
