= Joe Preston (politician) =

Canadian politician (born 1955)

Mayor of St. Thomas
- In office December 1, 2018 – November 16, 2026
- Preceded by: Heather Jackson
- Succeeded by: Jeff Kohler

Member of Parliament for Elgin—Middlesex—London
- In office June 28, 2004 – August 4, 2015
- Preceded by: Gar Knutson
- Succeeded by: Karen Vecchio

Chair of the Standing Committee on Procedure & House Affairs
- In office March 6, 2007 – August 2, 2015
- Minister: Peter Van Loan; Jay Hill; John Baird; Peter Van Loan
- Preceded by: Gary Goodyear
- Succeeded by: Larry Bagnell

Personal details
- Born: June 14, 1956 (age 70) Chatham, Ontario, Canada
- Party: Independent (since 2018)
- Other political affiliations: Conservative (2004–2015)
- Spouse: Stephanie Preston
- Profession: Politician; Franchisee

Joseph Preston (born June 14, 1955) is a Canadian politician who formerly served as the mayor of St. Thomas. Preston served two terms, the first term from 2018 until 2022, then won a second term from 2022 until 2026, when it was announced he was not seeking re-election. An election was called for October 27, 2026, in which Jeff Kohler succeeded him as mayor. Preston was previously a member of Parliament, representing Elgin—Middlesex—London riding from 2004 to 2015 as a member of a Conservative Party of Canada.

He defeated Liberal incumbent Gar Knutson in the 2004 federal election. He was re-elected in the 2006, 2008 and 2011 federal elections. He did not run again in 2015 and retired from parliament.

On July 10, 2018, Preston announced that he was running for mayor of St. Thomas in the 2018 Ontario municipal election, which he won.

Prior to being a member of Parliament, he was an entrepreneur in St. Thomas, and was active in local politics. In 2023, he married Stephanie Brown.

== Electoral record ==
2011 Canadian federal election
Party	Candidate	Votes	%	±%	Expenditures
Conservative	Joe Preston	29,147	57.55	+9.17	–
New Democratic	Fred Sinclair	12,439	24.56	+5.32	–
Liberal	Graham Warwick	6,812	13.45	-10.07	–
Green	John Fisher	1,529	3.02	-3.80	–
Christian Heritage	Carl Hiemstra	582	1.15	-0.15	–
Canadian Action	Will Arlow	140	0.28	+0.08	–
Total valid votes		50,649	100.00	–	
Total rejected ballots		170	0.33	-0.07	
Turnout		50,819	62.90	+3.24	
Eligible voters		80,796	–	–	

2008 Canadian federal election
Party	Candidate	Votes	%	±%	Expenditures
Conservative	Joe Preston	22,970	48.38	+2.8	$77,732
Liberal	Suzanne van Bommel	11,169	23.52	-2.8	$79,198
New Democratic	Ryan Dolby	9,135	19.24	0.0	$12,502
Green	Noel Burgon	3,241	6.82	+1.2	
Christian Heritage	Carl Hiemstra	619	1.30	-0.7	$9,598
Independent	Michael van Holst	243	0.51	–	$1,875
Canadian Action	Will Arlow	96	0.20	0.0	
Total valid votes/Expense limit		47,473	100.0	$85,544	
Total rejected ballots		190	0.40		
Turnout		47,663	59.66		

2006 Canadian federal election
Party	Candidate	Votes	%	±%
Conservative	Joe Preston	23,416	45.6	+1.8
Liberal	Crispin Colvin	13,507	26.3	-7.9
New Democratic	Tim McCallum	9,873	19.2	+4.6
Green	Jonathan Martyn	2,878	5.6	+1.2
Christian Heritage	Ken DeVries	1,049	2.0	-0.7
Progressive Canadian	Phill Borm	504	1.0	
Canadian Action	Will Arlow	105	0.2	-0.1
Total valid votes		51,332	100.0	

2004 Canadian federal election
Party	Candidate	Votes	%	±%
Conservative	Joe Preston	20,333	43.8	-8.7
Liberal	Gar Knutson	15,860	34.2	-6.2
New Democratic	Tim McCallum	6,763	14.6	+9.4
Green	Julie-Ann Stodolny	2,033	4.4	+3.4
Christian Heritage	Ken DeVries	1,246	2.7	+1.8
Canadian Action	Will Arlow	146	0.3	
Total valid votes		46,381	100.0	
