= John Wise (Canadian politician) =

Canadian politician (1935–2013)

The Honourable John Wise PC

Minister of Agriculture
- In office September 17, 1984 – September 14, 1988
- Prime Minister: Brian Mulroney
- Preceded by: Ralph Ferguson
- Succeeded by: Don Mazankowski
- In office June 4, 1979 – March 2, 1980
- Prime Minister: Joe Clark
- Preceded by: Eugene Whelan
- Succeeded by: Eugene Whelan

Member of Parliament for Elgin
- In office October 30, 1972 – November 21, 1988
- Preceded by: Harold Edwin Stafford
- Succeeded by: Ken Monteith

Personal details
- Born: December 12, 1935 St. Thomas, Ontario, Canada
- Died: January 9, 2013 (aged 77) London, Ontario, Canada
- Party: Progressive Conservative
- Profession: Dairy farmer

John Wise PC (December 12, 1935 – January 9, 2013) was a Canadian politician from Ontario.

== Early years ==
Born in St. Thomas, Ontario, Wise was a dairy farmer and a local politician in St. Thomas - Elgin:

- Township councillor and deputy reeve of Yarmouth Township 1966-1967
- Reeve of Yarmouth Township 1967-1968
- Warden for Elgin County 1969

== Federal politics ==
Wise was first elected as a Progressive Conservative to the House of Commons of Canada representing the riding of Elgin in 1972. He was re-elected in 1974, 1979, 1980 and 1984. He was the Minister of Agriculture in both Joe Clark's cabinet (June 4, 1979 – March 2, 1980) and Brian Mulroney's cabinet (September 17, 1984 – September 14, 1988).

== Retirement ==
In 1988, Wise retired from Parliament to his farm (dairy operations sold in the 1970s). After leaving politics, he served on various agriculture related boards:

- Board member for Amtelcom
- Chairman of the board, Canadian Livestock Exporters Association and Canadian Embryo Exporters Association

Wise was honorary founder and President of Soil Conservation Canada and cattle judge in Elgin County.

== Death ==
Wise died on January 9, 2013, at the age of 77 in London, Ontario.
