= John H. Munroe =

Canadian politician

John H. Munroe (1820 – January 25, 1885) was an Ontario real estate agent and political figure. He represented Elgin West in the 1st Canadian Parliament as a Conservative member.

He was born in Williamsburg Township, Upper Canada in 1820 and was educated there. Munroe settled in Wardsville. He served on the county council and was later warden for Middlesex County. Munroe was defeated when he ran for reelection to the House of Commons in 1872. He died in Morrisburg.
