= Hugh Cummings McKillop =

Canadian politician

Member of Parliament for Elgin West
- In office December 1921 – September 1926

Personal details
- Born: Hugh Cummings McKillop; 26 November 1872 West Lorne, Ontario, Canada
- Died: 8 November 1937 (aged 64)
- Party: Conservative
- Spouse(s): Norma E. Shirk m. 12 October 1907
- Profession: Industrialist, lumberman

Hugh Cummings McKillop (26 November 1872 – 8 November 1937) was a Conservative member of the House of Commons of Canada. He was born in West Lorne, Ontario and became an industrialist and lumberman.

He worked with A. McKillop and Sons Ltd. where he was vice-president at one point and was also president of West Elgin Milling and Produce Company. He had three brothers: Daniel McKillop, J.A. McKillop, and A. McKillop, all of whom were involved with A. McKillop and Sons Ltd.

He was first elected to Parliament at the Elgin West riding in the 1921 general election, then re-elected in 1925. McKillop was defeated in the 1926 election by Mitchell Hepburn of the Liberals.

For three years, McKillop served as reeve of West Lorne, Ontario. At one time he was also a regional councillor for Elgin County.
