= M. Wayne Neal =

Canadian politician

M. Wayne Neal is a former mayor of St. Thomas, Ontario.

Born in St. Thomas on April 4, 1939, Wayne graduated from the University of Western Ontario in 1961. While at Western, he captained the Mustangs football team, was an all-Canadian athlete, and was drafted by the Canadian Football League. He chose to return to his hometown to begin a career as an educator, first as a teacher, later as a principal and finally as a superintendent of education for Elgin County.

He served as mayor of St. Thomas in 1975–1976. He also served as city councillor from 1973 to 1974 and from 1977 to 1978. In addition to serving the local community politically, he was active with many local charities including Big Brothers and the Elgin Military Museum. He is an active local historian, and authored "Five Boys from Myrtle Street", a biography of five local boys who served in the RCAF and RAF during World War II.
