= Jabel Robinson =

Canadian politician

Jabel Robinson (11 December 1831 – 9 November 1907) was a Canadian farmer, lumber merchant and political figure in Ontario, Canada. He represented Elgin West in the House of Commons of Canada from 1900 to 1904 as an Independent.

He was born in Linslade, Buckinghamshire, the son of William Robinson and May Clover, and was educated in England. He first worked as a carpenter and joiner. He was married twice: to Caroline Barnwell in 1854 and to Mary S. Mines in 1887. He served as a member of the St. Thomas town council and as a member of the council for Southwold Township.
