= 2026 Windsor municipal election =

Municipal election in Ontario, Canada

- October 26, 2026
- Turnout: 31.84% (▲0.27 pp)

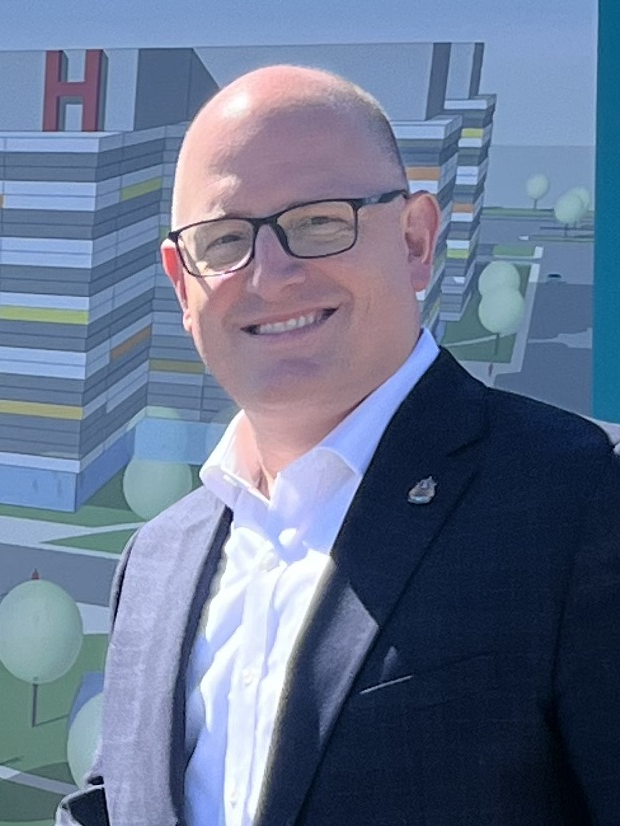
Nominee	Fred Francis	Drew Dilkens	Kat Pasquash
Popular vote	28,204	20,021	7,253
Percentage	47.64%	33.82%	12.25%
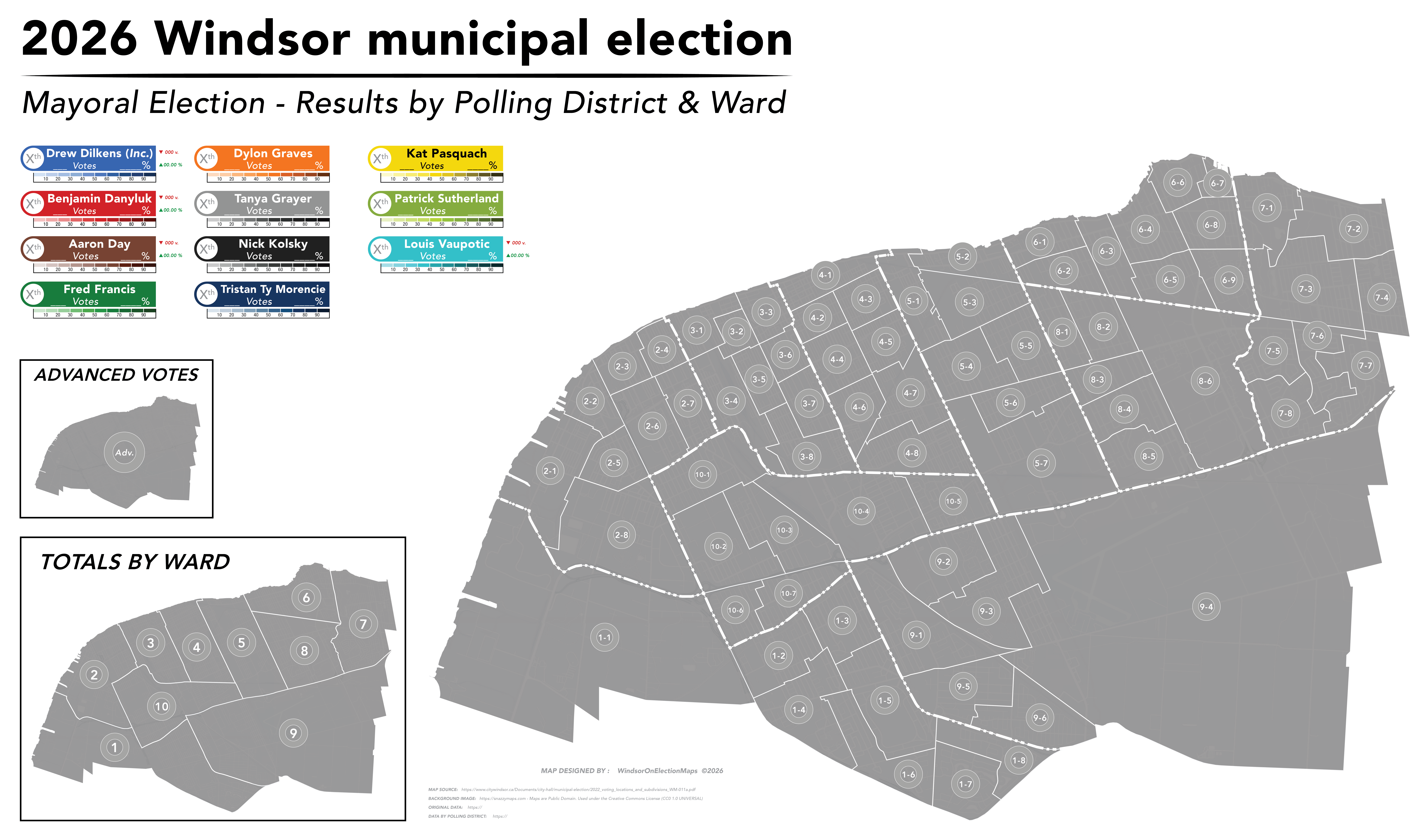
- Map showing the winning candidate's vote strength in each of the 10 wards. Each polling station's vote is shown as pie charts.
Mayor before election
Drew Dilkens
Elected mayor
Fred Francis

The 2026 Windsor municipal election was held on October 26, 2026, to elect the mayor of Windsor, Windsor City Council and the Greater Essex County District School Board, Windsor Essex Catholic District School Board, Conseil scolaire catholique Providence and Conseil scolaire Viamonde.

The election was held on the same day as elections in every other municipality in Ontario, as well as the elections in the neighbouring towns in Essex County.

Nominations opened on May 1, and the deadline for filing was on August 21, 2026. The candidates registered to run for all open seats are as follows:

== Mayor ==
Incumbent mayor Drew Dilkens announced on August 20 that he will be seeking a fourth term. He was challenged by three-term Ward 1 Councillor Fred Francis, who is the younger brother of former mayor Eddie Francis.

Dilkens lost his bid for re-election, becoming the first incumbent Windsor mayor to lose a re-election bid since Bert Weeks defeated Frank Wansbrough in 1974. Francis' election made him the second Lebanese mayor in the city's history and the first to be a relative of a previous one.

Candidate	Popular vote		
Candidate	Votes	%	±%
Fred Francis	28,204	47.64	--
Drew Dilkens (X)	20,021	33.82	-18.69
Kat Pasquach	7,253	12.25	--
Tara Grayer	878	1.48	--
Nick Kolasky	640	1.08	--
Patrick Sutherland	592	1.00	--
Benjamin Danyluk	538	0.91	-0.86
Aaron Day	420	0.71	-0.33
Dylon Graves	304	0.51	--
Tristan Ty Morencie	182	0.31	--
Louis Vaupotic	169	0.29	-0.10
Total valid votes	TBD	TBD	
Total rejected, unmarked and declined votes	TBD	TBD	
Turnout	TBD	31.84	+0.27
Eligible voters	TBD		
Note: Candidate campaign colours are based on the prominent colour used in campaign items (signs, literature, etc.) and are used as a visual differentiation between candidates. Colours from prior party affiliations may be used as well.
Sources: City of Windsor

== City Council ==
Four of the ten wards in the city are open seats (Wards 1, 4, 5, 6), the most seen in a municipal election since 2014 - which also saw 4 wards being open seats.

=== Ward 1 ===
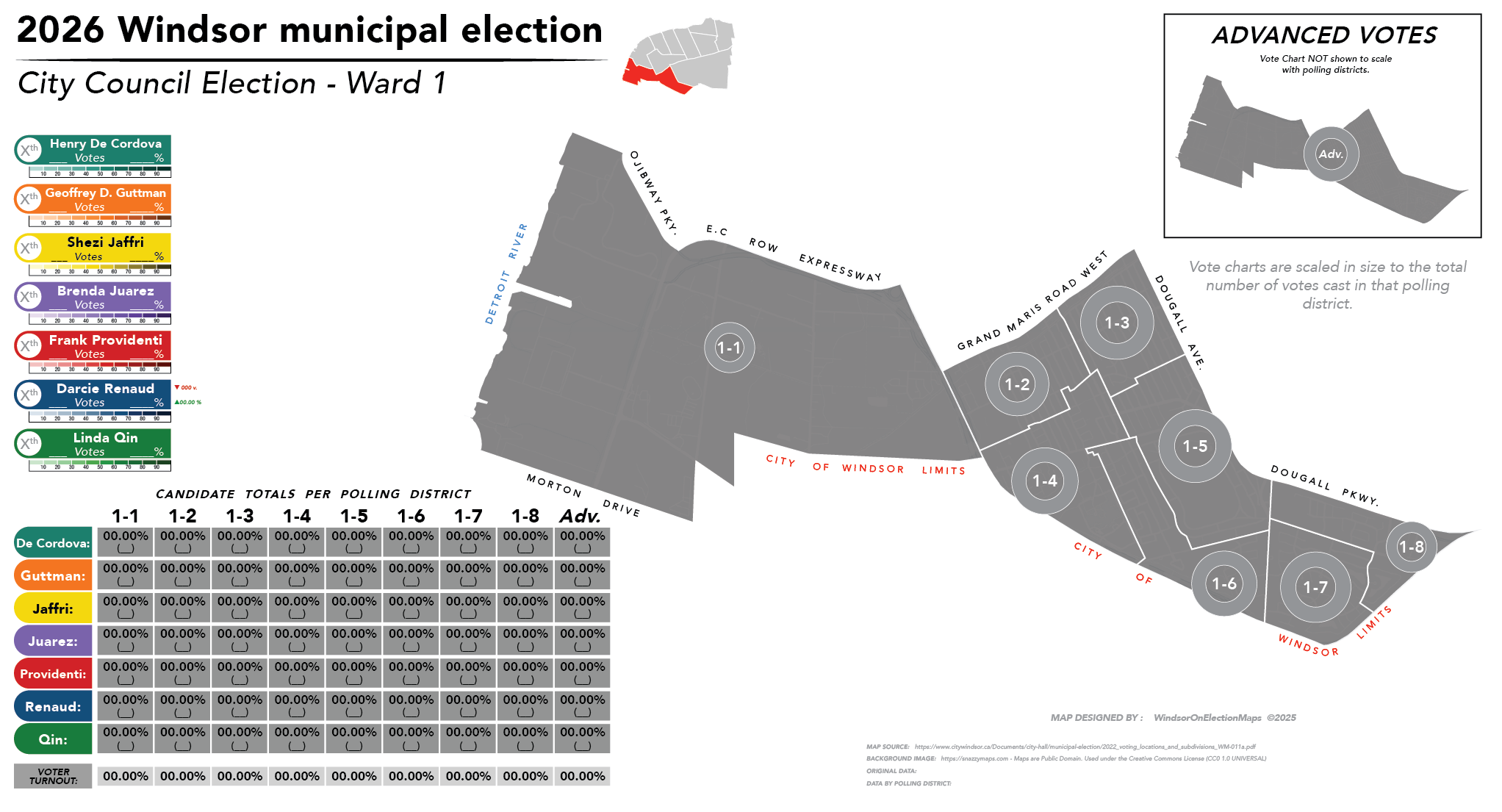
Results of the election in Ward 1. Polling districts are shaded by which candidate gained the majority of the vote.

Incumbent Councillor Fred Francis announced he would be stepping down from Council to run for Mayor.

Candidate	Popular vote		
Candidate	Votes	%	±%
Darcie Renaud	3166	40.17	TBD
Frank Providenti	2308	29.28	--
Linda Qin	1533	19.45	--
Shezi Jaffri	480	6.09	--
Henry De Cordova	158	2.00	--
Geoffrey D. Guttmann	131	1.66	--
Brenda Juarez	106	1.34	--
Total valid votes	TBD	TBD	
Total rejected, unmarked and declined votes	TBD	TBD	
Turnout	TBD	TBD	TBD
Eligible voters	TBD		
Note: Candidate campaign colours are based on the prominent colour used in campaign items (signs, literature, etc.) and are used as a visual differentiation between candidates. Colours from prior party affiliations may be used as well.
Sources: City of Windsor

=== Ward 2 ===
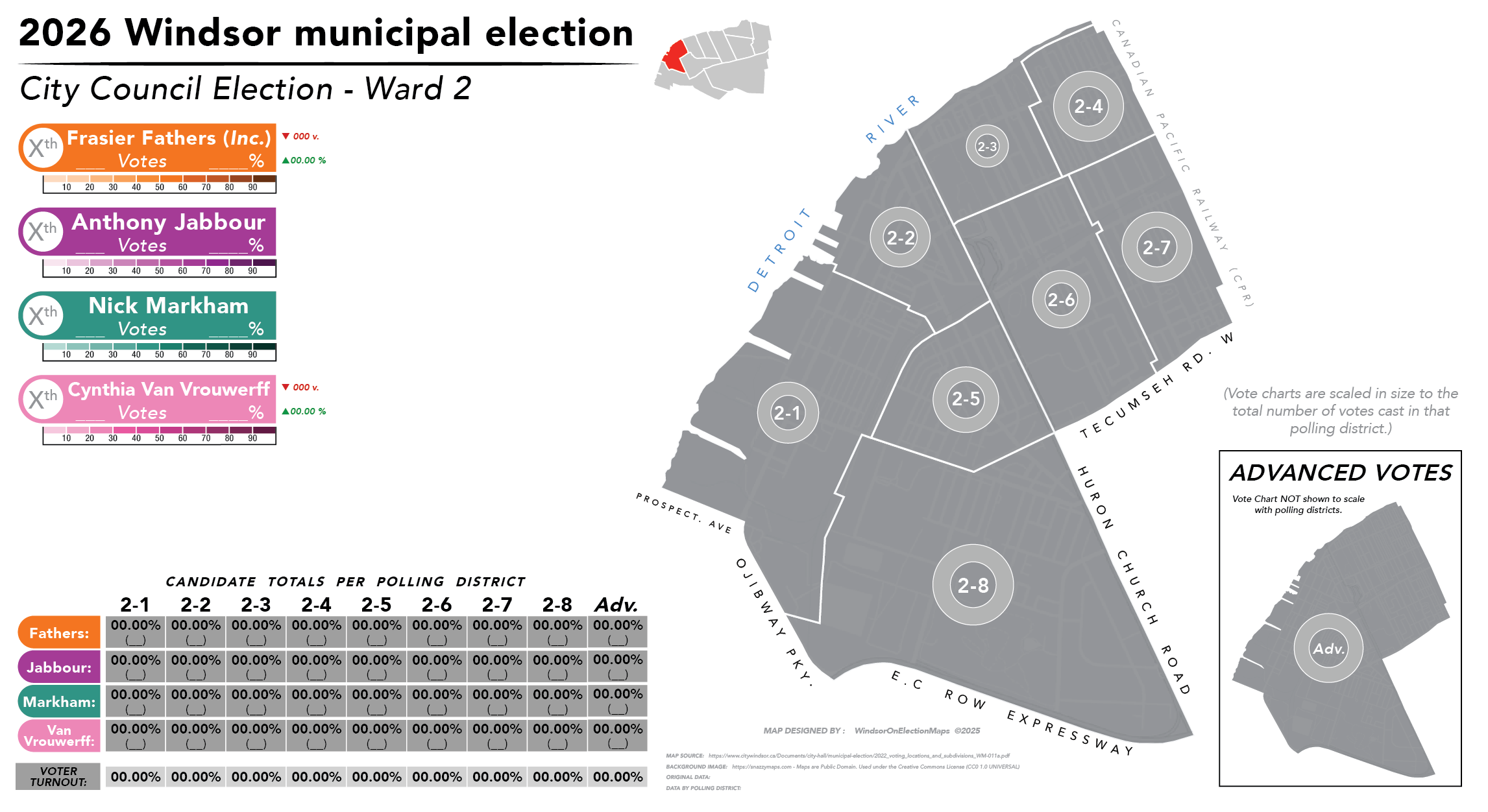
Results of the election in Ward 2. Polling districts are shaded by which candidate gained the majority of the vote.

Candidate	Popular vote		
Candidate	Votes	%	±%
Frazier Fathers (X)	2830	80.79	TBD
Nick Markham	276	7.88	--
Cynthia Van Vrouwerff	217	6.19	TBD
Anthony Jabbour	180	5.14	--
Total valid votes	TBD	TBD	
Total rejected, unmarked and declined votes	TBD	TBD	
Turnout (from 2025 by-election)	TBD	TBD	TBD
Turnout (from 2022 election)	TBD	TBD	TBD
Eligible voters	TBD		
Note: Candidate campaign colours are based on the prominent colour used in campaign items (signs, literature, etc.) and are used as a visual differentiation between candidates. Colours from prior party affiliations may be used as well.
Sources: City of Windsor

=== Ward 3 ===
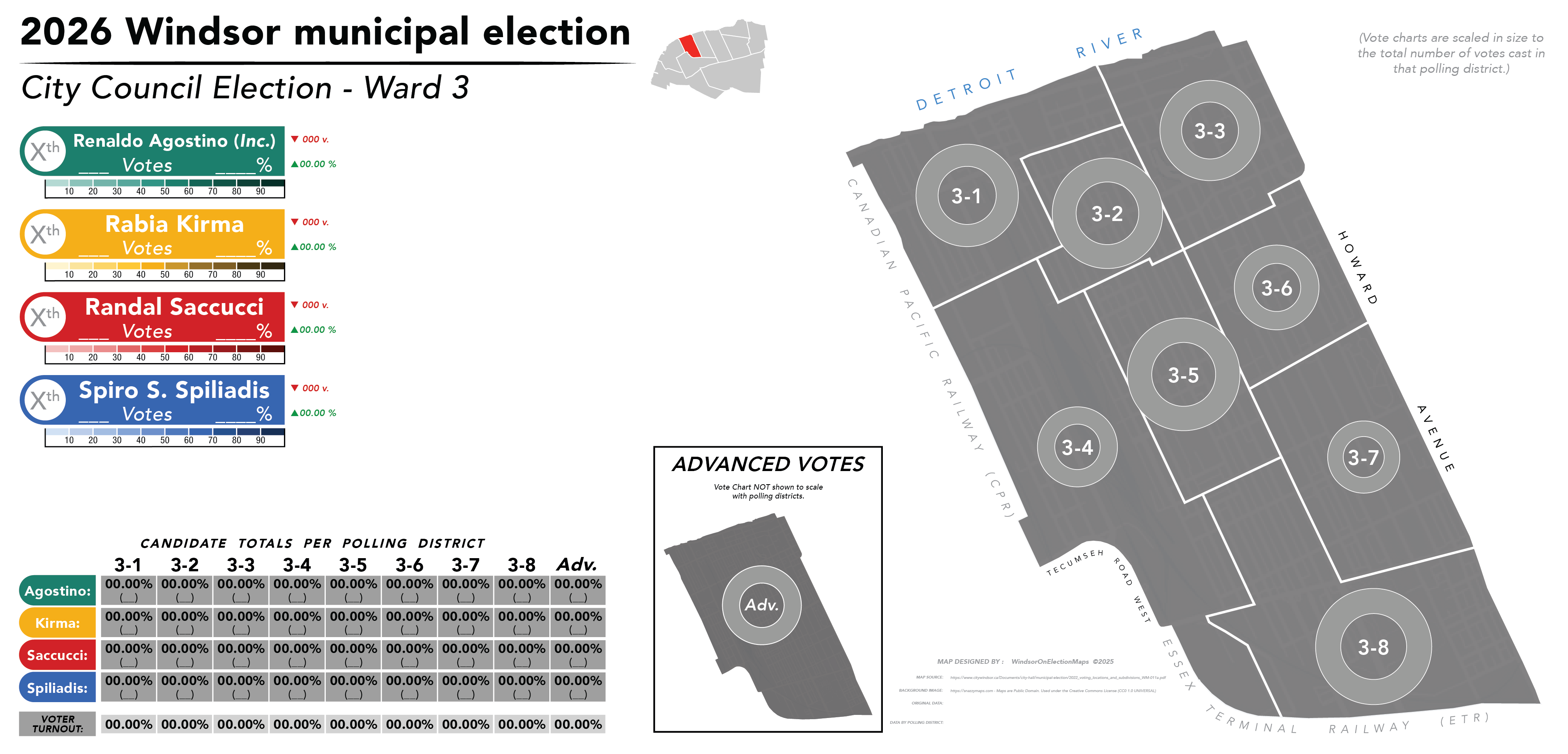
Results of the election in Ward 3. Polling districts are shaded by which candidate gained the majority of the vote.

Candidate	Popular vote		
Candidate	Votes	%	±%
Renaldo Agostino (X)	2789	67.79	TBD
Rabia Kirma	766	18.62	--
Spiro S. Spiliadis	370	8.99	--
Randal Saccucci	189	4.59	--
Total valid votes	TBD	TBD	
Total rejected, unmarked and declined votes	TBD	TBD	
Turnout	TBD	TBD	TBD
Eligible voters	TBD		
Note: Candidate campaign colours are based on the prominent colour used in campaign items (signs, literature, etc.) and are used as a visual differentiation between candidates. Colours from prior party affiliations may be used as well.
Sources: City of Windsor

=== Ward 4 ===
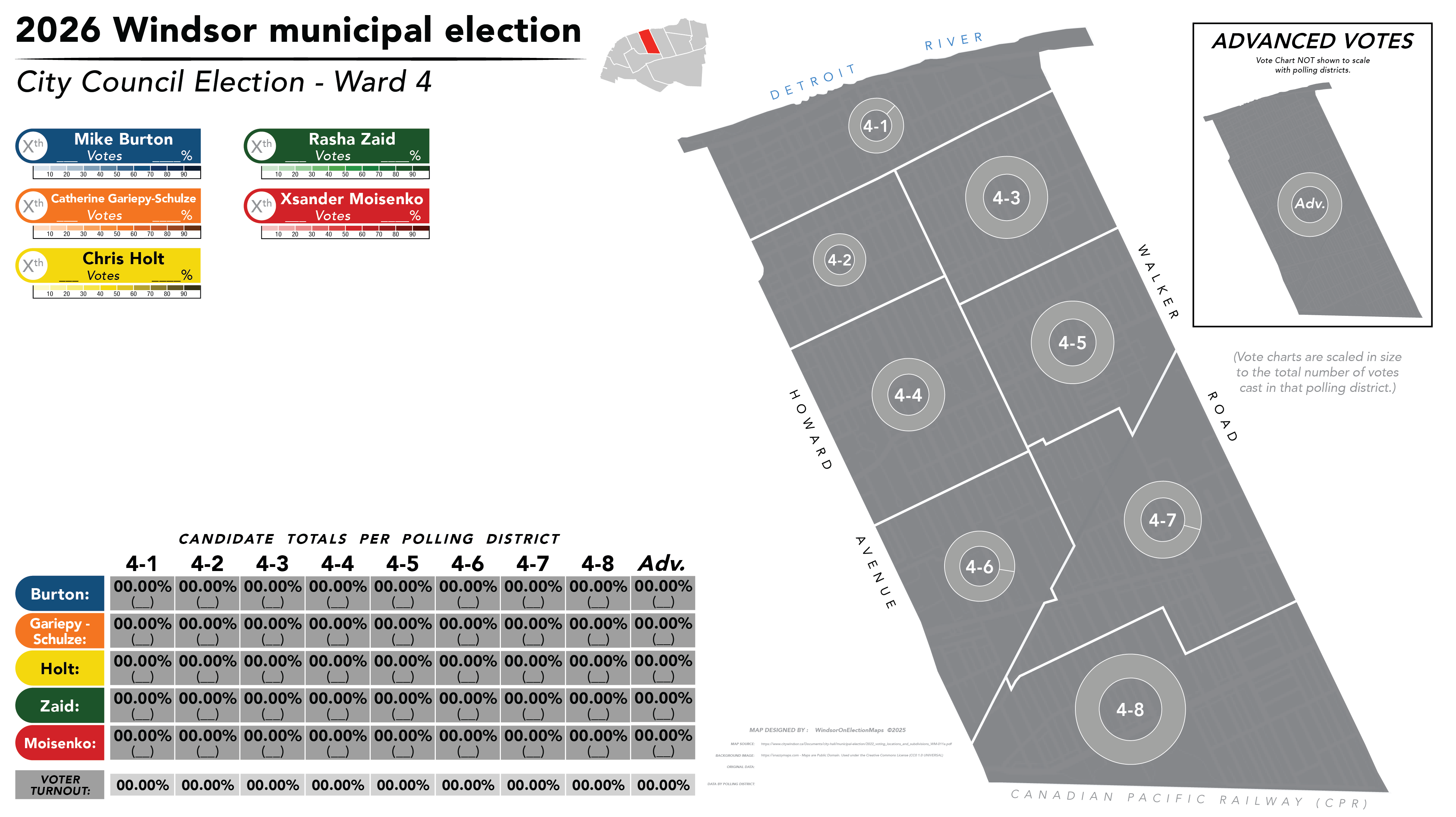
Results of the election in Ward 4. Polling districts are shaded by which candidate gained the majority of the vote.

Incumbent Councillor Mark McKenzie announced on August 7 that he would not be running for a second term. Chris Holt, who had served as Councillor for two terms from 2014 to 2022 announced on August 11 that he was seeking his old seat.

Candidate	Popular vote		
Candidate	Votes	%	±%
Chris Holt	3657	55.54	--
Rasha Zaid	1232	18.71	--
Mike Burton	1134	17.22	--
Catherine Gariepy-Schulze	349	5.30	--
Xsander Moisenko	213	3.23	--
Total valid votes	TBD	TBD	
Total rejected, unmarked and declined votes	TBD	TBD	
Turnout	TBD	TBD	TBD
Eligible voters	TBD		
Note: Candidate campaign colours are based on the prominent colour used in campaign items (signs, literature, etc.) and are used as a visual differentiation between candidates. Colours from prior party affiliations may be used as well.
Sources: City of Windsor

=== Ward 5 ===
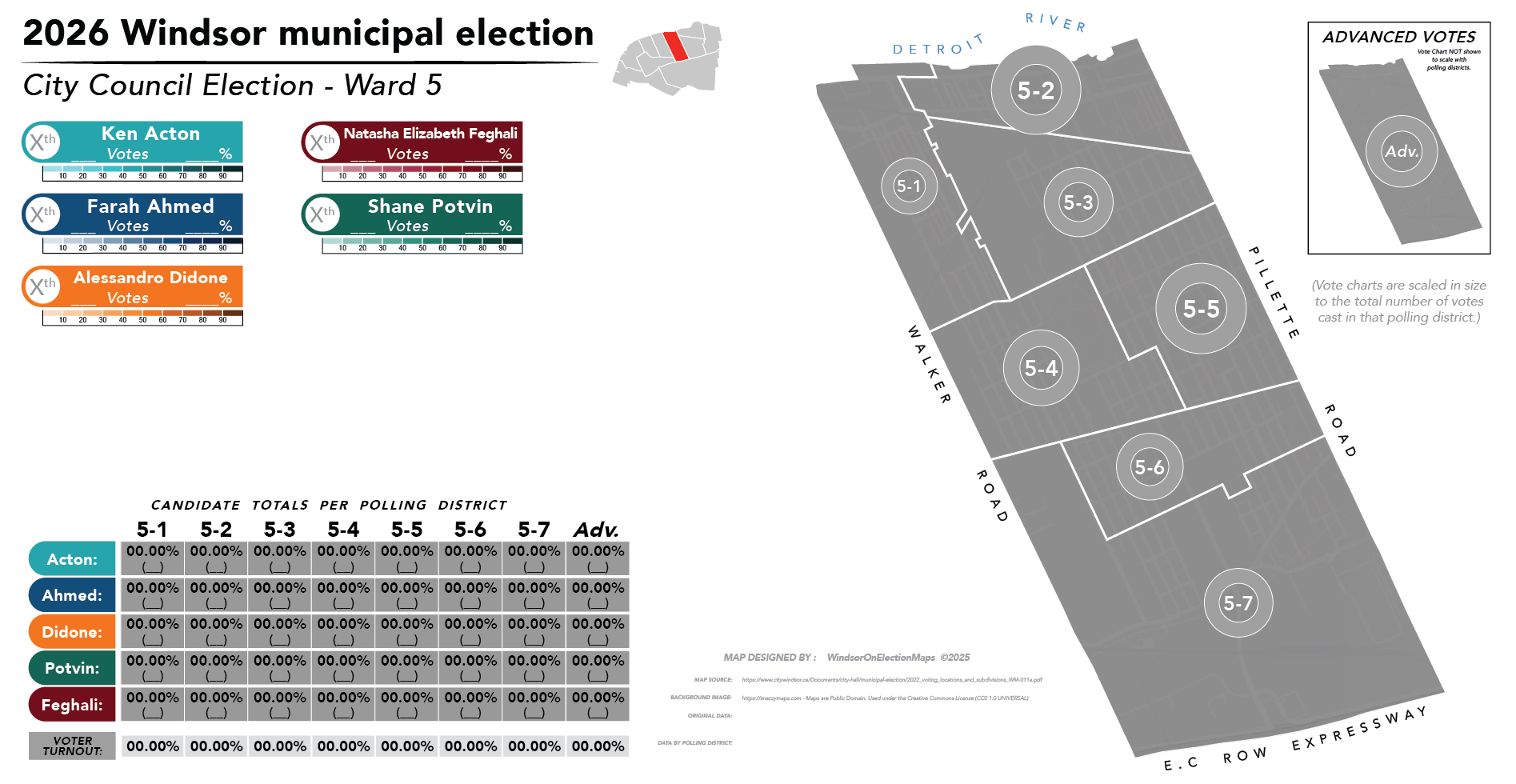
Results of the election in Ward 5. Polling districts are shaded by which candidate gained the majority of the vote.

Incumbent Councillor Ed Sleiman announced on 14 August that he would not be seeking another term, having been on Council since 2010.

Candidate	Popular vote		
Candidate	Votes	%	±%
Ken Acton	2346	49.07	TBD
Shane Potvin	1495	31.27	--
Natasha Elizabeth Feghali	616	12.88	--
Alessandro Didone	163	3.41	TBD
Farah Ahmed	161	3.37	--
Total valid votes	TBD	TBD	
Total rejected, unmarked and declined votes	TBD	TBD	
Turnout	TBD	TBD	TBD
Eligible voters	TBD		
Note: Candidate campaign colours are based on the prominent colour used in campaign items (signs, literature, etc.) and are used as a visual differentiation between candidates. Colours from prior party affiliations may be used as well.
Sources: City of Windsor

=== Ward 6 ===
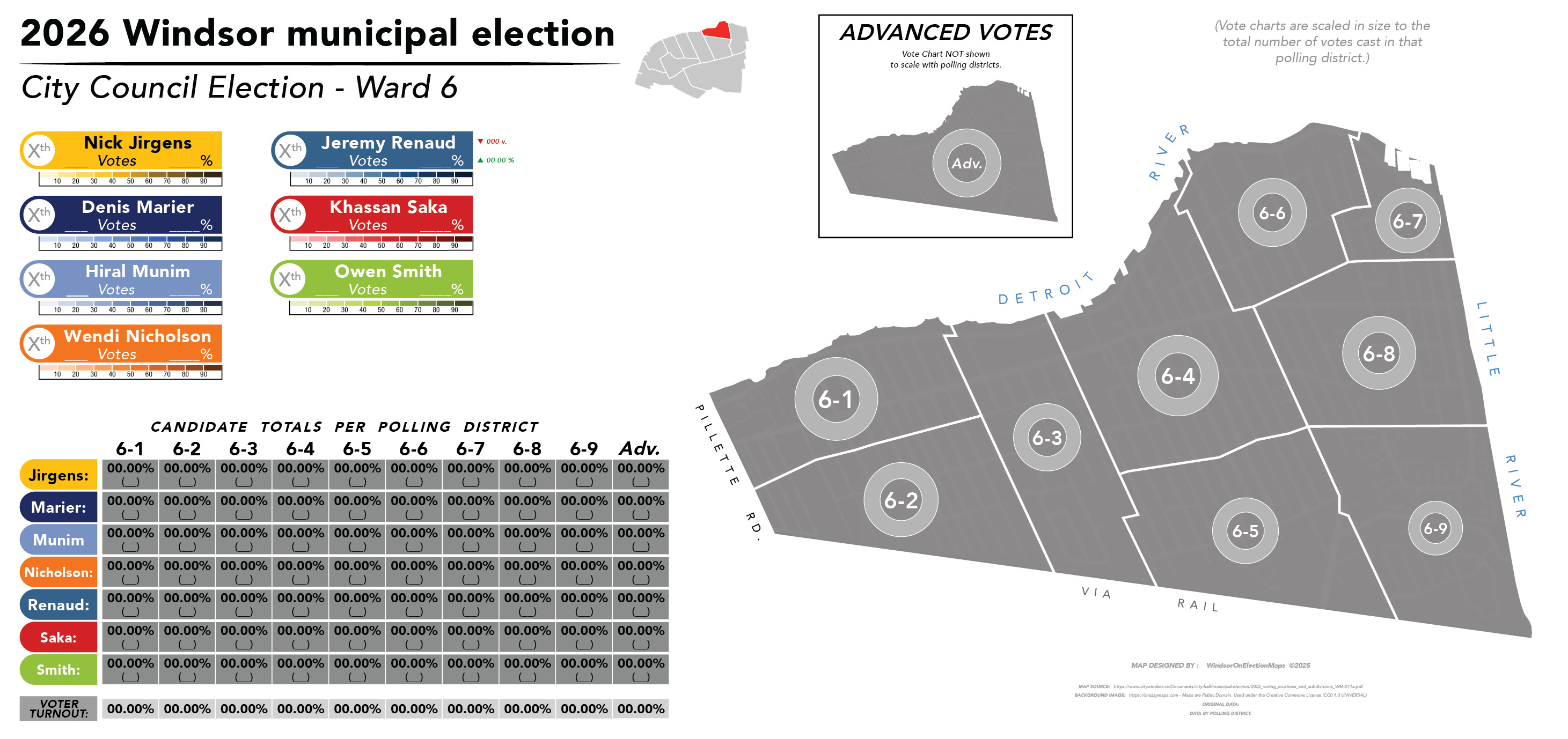
Results of the election in Ward 6. Polling districts are shaded by which candidate gained the majority of the vote.

Incumbent Councillor Jo-Anne Gignac announced in a council meeting on 27 July that she would not be running for re-election. She had been a Councillor since 2003.

Candidate	Popular vote		
Candidate	Votes	%	±%
Jeremy Renaud	3288	43.03	TBD
Nick Jirgens	1577	20.64	--
Denis Marier	1160	15.18	--
Wendi Nicholson	583	7.63	--
Hiral Munim	375	4.91	--
Khassan Saka	336	4.40	--
Owen Smith	322	4.21	--
Total valid votes	TBD	TBD	
Total rejected, unmarked and declined votes	TBD	TBD	
Turnout	TBD	TBD	TBD
Eligible voters	TBD		
Note: Candidate campaign colours are based on the prominent colour used in campaign items (signs, literature, etc.) and are used as a visual differentiation between candidates. Colours from prior party affiliations may be used as well.
Sources: City of Windsor

=== Ward 7 ===
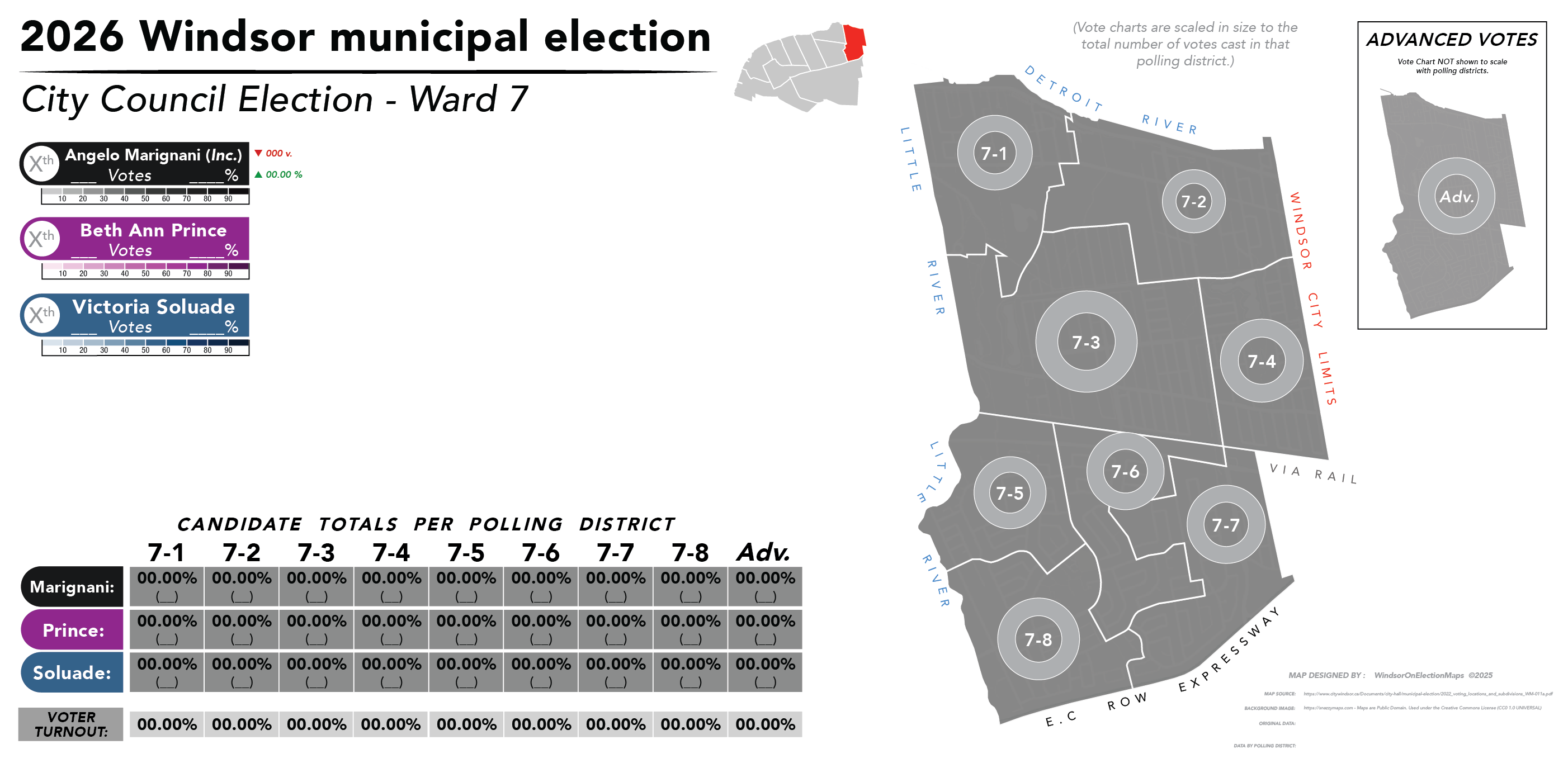
Results of the election in Ward 7. Polling districts are shaded by which candidate gained the majority of the vote.

Candidate	Popular vote		
Candidate	Votes	%	±%
Angelo Marignani (X)	5559	69.99	TBD
Beth Ann Prince	2009	25.30	--
Victoria Soluade	374	4.71	--
Total valid votes	TBD	TBD	
Total rejected, unmarked and declined votes	TBD	TBD	
Turnout	TBD	TBD	TBD
Eligible voters	TBD		
Note: Candidate campaign colours are based on the prominent colour used in campaign items (signs, literature, etc.) and are used as a visual differentiation between candidates. Colours from prior party affiliations may be used as well.
Sources: City of Windsor

=== Ward 8 ===
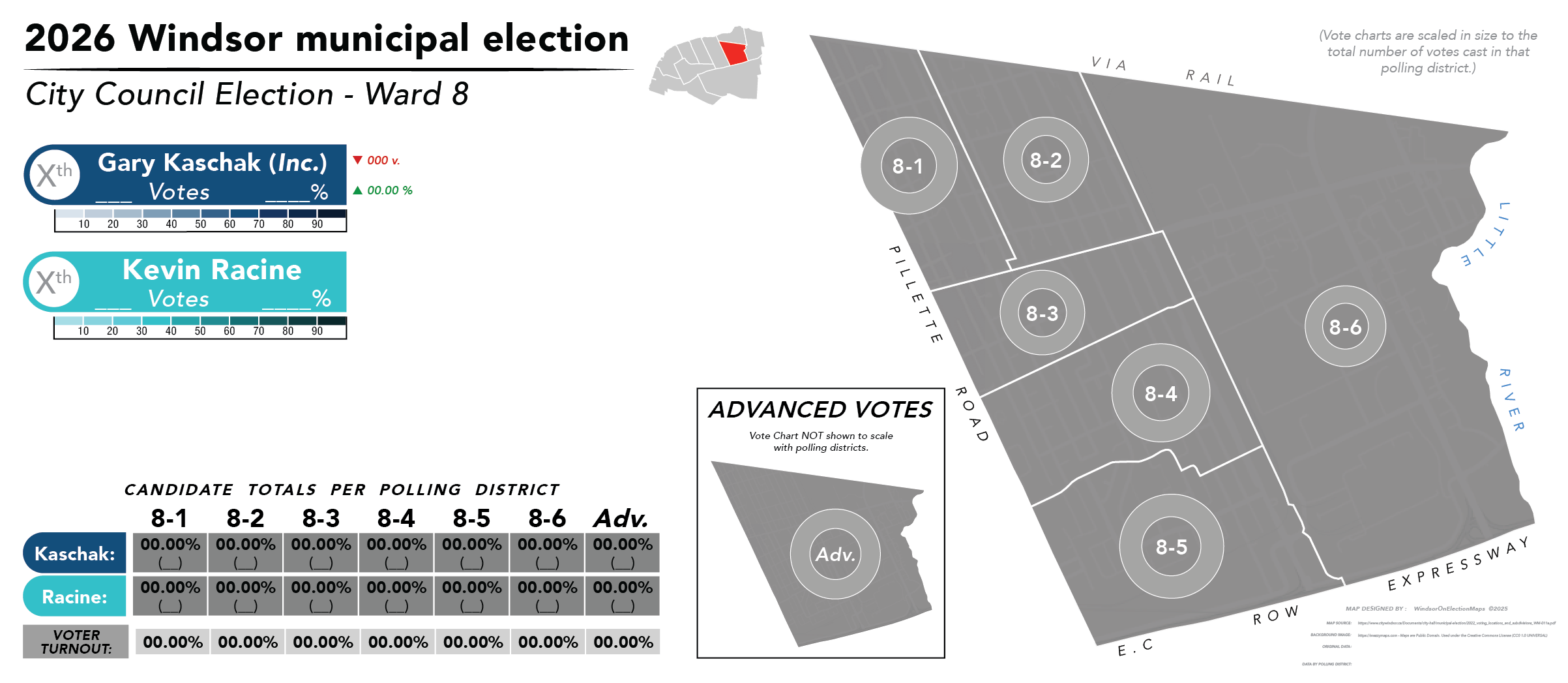
Results of the election in Ward 8. Polling districts are shaded by which candidate gained the majority of the vote.

Candidate	Popular vote		
Candidate	Votes	%	±%
Gary Kaschak (X)	2213	51.91	TBD
Kevin Racine	2050	48.09	--
Total valid votes	TBD	TBD	
Total rejected, unmarked and declined votes	TBD	TBD	
Turnout	TBD	TBD	TBD
Eligible voters	TBD		
Note: Candidate campaign colours are based on the prominent colour used in campaign items (signs, literature, etc.) and are used as a visual differentiation between candidates. Colours from prior party affiliations may be used as well.
Sources: City of Windsor

=== Ward 9 ===
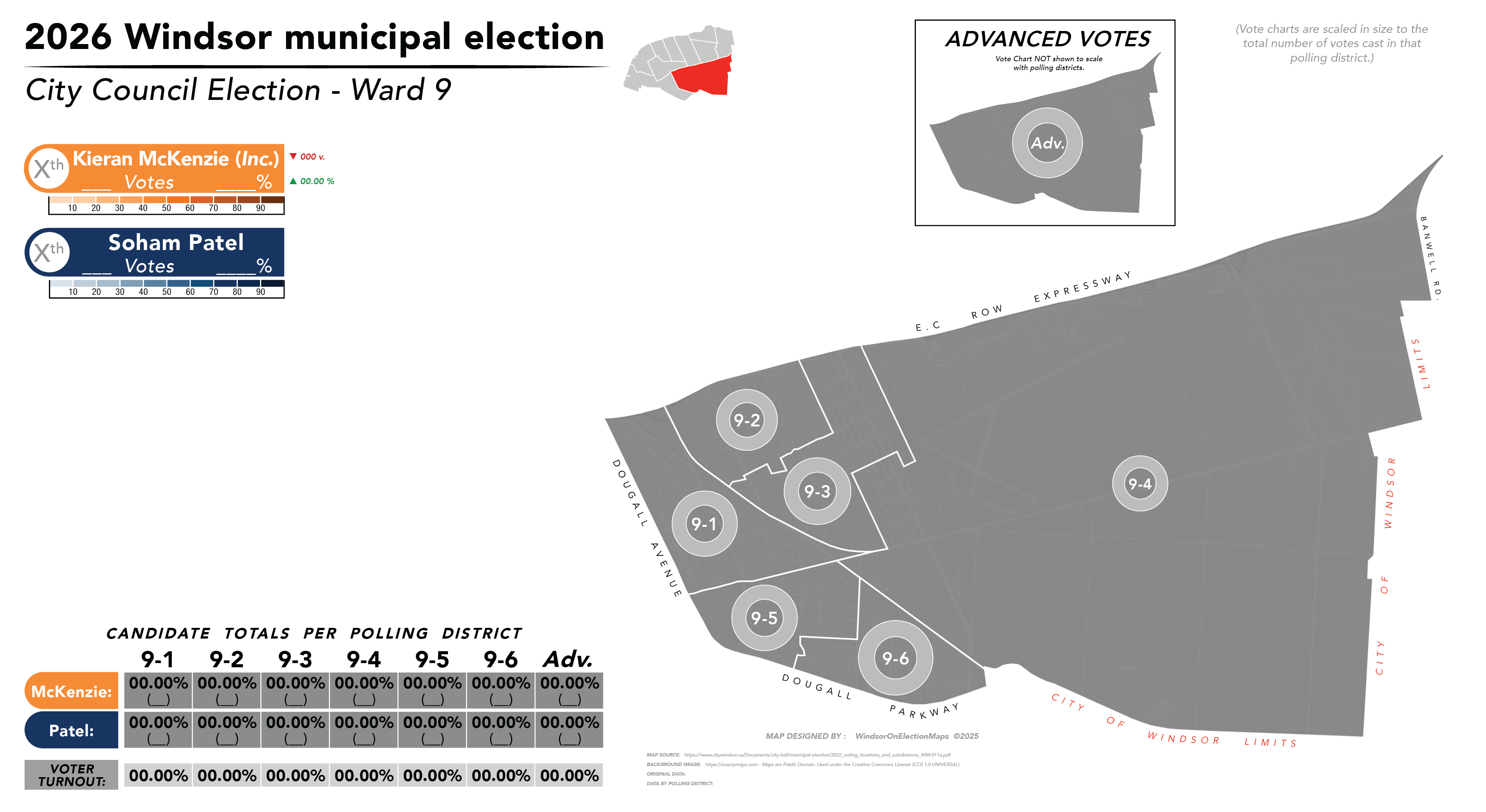
Results of the election in Ward 9. Polling districts are shaded by which candidate gained the majority of the vote.

Candidate	Popular vote		
Candidate	Votes	%	±%
Kieran McKenzie (X)	4222	74.38	TBD
Soham Patel	1454	25.62	--
Total valid votes	TBD	TBD	
Total rejected, unmarked and declined votes	TBD	TBD	
Turnout	TBD	TBD	TBD
Eligible voters	TBD		
Note: Candidate campaign colours are based on the prominent colour used in campaign items (signs, literature, etc.) and are used as a visual differentiation between candidates. Colours from prior party affiliations may be used as well.
Sources: City of Windsor

=== Ward 10 ===
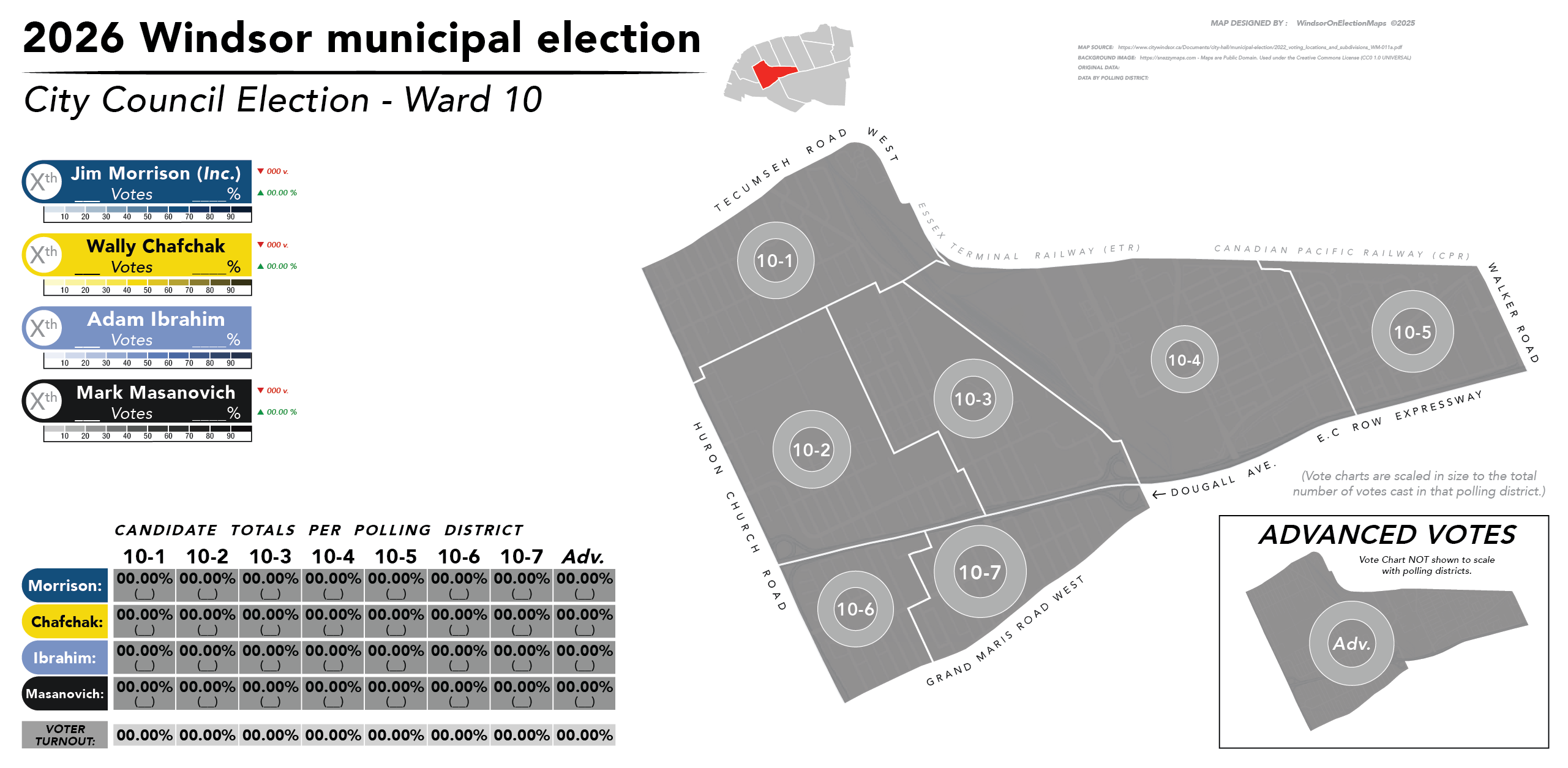
Results of the election in Ward 10. Polling districts are shaded by which candidate gained the majority of the vote.

Candidate	Popular vote		
Candidate	Votes	%	±%
Mark Masanovich	2259	37.03	TBD
Adam Ibrahim	1857	30.44	--
Jim Morrison (X)	1331	21.82	TBD
Wally Chafchak	654	10.72	TBD
Total valid votes	TBD	TBD	
Total rejected, unmarked and declined votes	TBD	TBD	
Turnout	TBD	TBD	TBD
Eligible voters	TBD		
Note: Candidate campaign colours are based on the prominent colour used in campaign items (signs, literature, etc.) and are used as a visual differentiation between candidates. Colours from prior party affiliations may be used as well.
Sources: City of Windsor

== Greater Essex County District School Board ==
=== Wards 1, 2, 9 ===
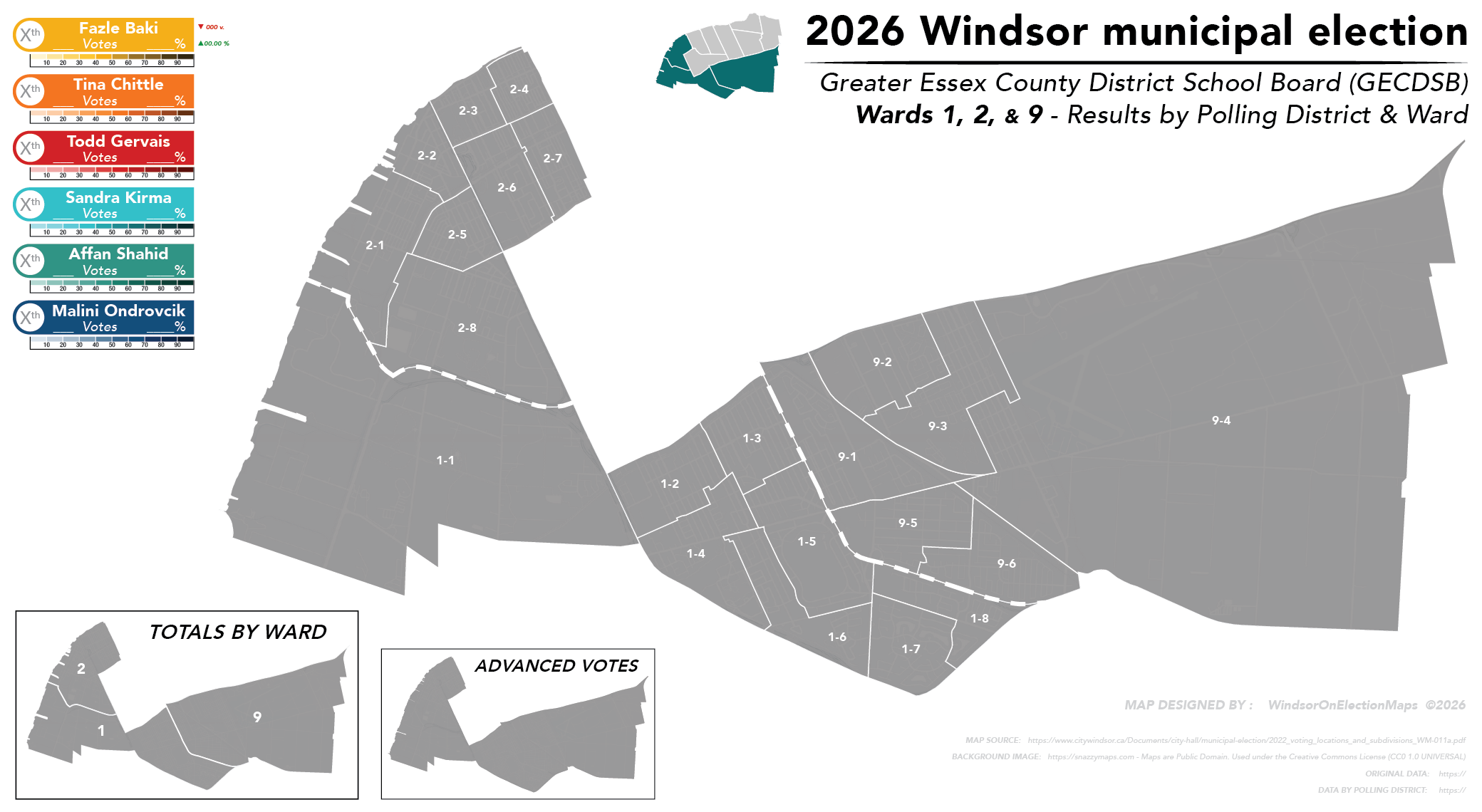
Results of the GECDSB election in Wards 1, 2, & 9. Polling districts are shaded by which candidate gained the majority of the vote.

Candidate (vote for 2)	Popular vote		
Candidate (vote for 2)	Votes	%	±%
Fazle Baki	TBD	TBD	TBD
Tina Chittle	TBD	TBD	TBD
Todd Gervais	TBD	TBD	TBD
Sandra Kirma	TBD	TBD	TBD
Affan Shahid	TBD	TBD	TBD
Malini Ondrovcik	TBD	TBD	TBD
Total valid votes	TBD	TBD	
Total rejected, unmarked and declined votes	TBD	TBD	
Turnout	TBD	TBD	TBD
Eligible voters	TBD		
Note: Candidate campaign colours are based on the prominent colour used in campaign items (signs, literature, etc.) and are used as a visual differentiation between candidates. Colours from prior party affiliations may be used as well.

=== Wards 3, 4, 10 ===
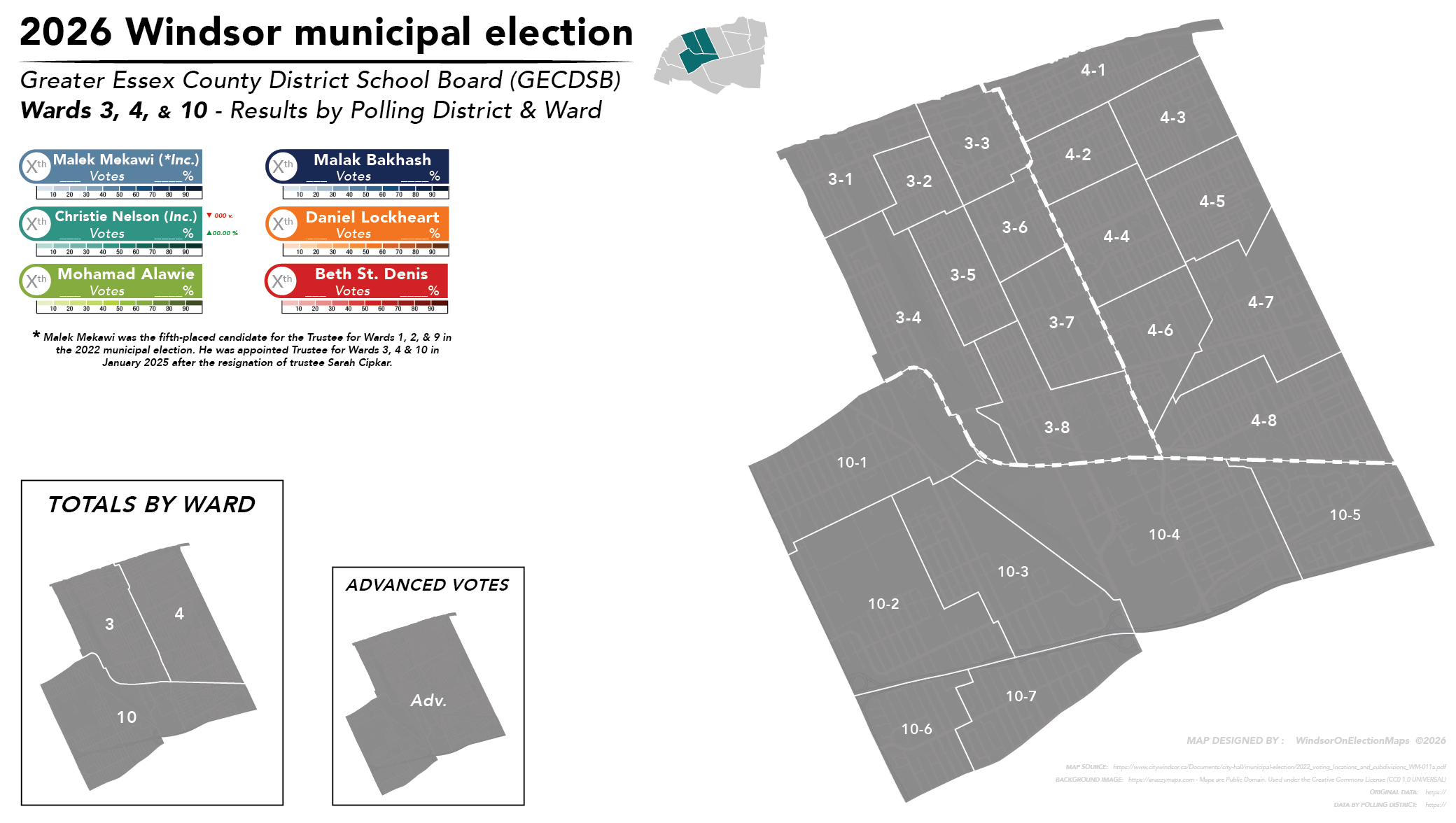
Results of the GECDSB election in Wards 3, 4, & 10. Polling districts are shaded by which candidate gained the majority of the vote.

Candidate (vote for 2)	Popular vote		
Candidate (vote for 2)	Votes	%	±%
Malek Mekawi (X) (Note: Malek Mekawi was the fifth-placed candidate for the Trustee for Wards 1, 2, & 9 in the 2022 municipal election. He was appointed Trustee for Wards 3, 4 & 10 in January 2025 after the resignation of Sarah Cipkar.)	TBD	TBD	TBD
Christie Nelson (X)	TBD	TBD	TBD
Mohamad Alawie	TBD	TBD	TBD
Malak Bakhash	TBD	TBD	TBD
Daniel Lockhart	TBD	TBD	TBD
Beth St. Denis	TBD	TBD	TBD
Total valid votes	TBD	TBD	
Total rejected, unmarked and declined votes	TBD	TBD	
Turnout	TBD	TBD	TBD
Eligible voters	TBD		
Note: Candidate campaign colours are based on the prominent colour used in campaign items (signs, literature, etc.) and are used as a visual differentiation between candidates. Colours from prior party affiliations may be used as well.

=== Wards 5, 6, 7, 8 ===
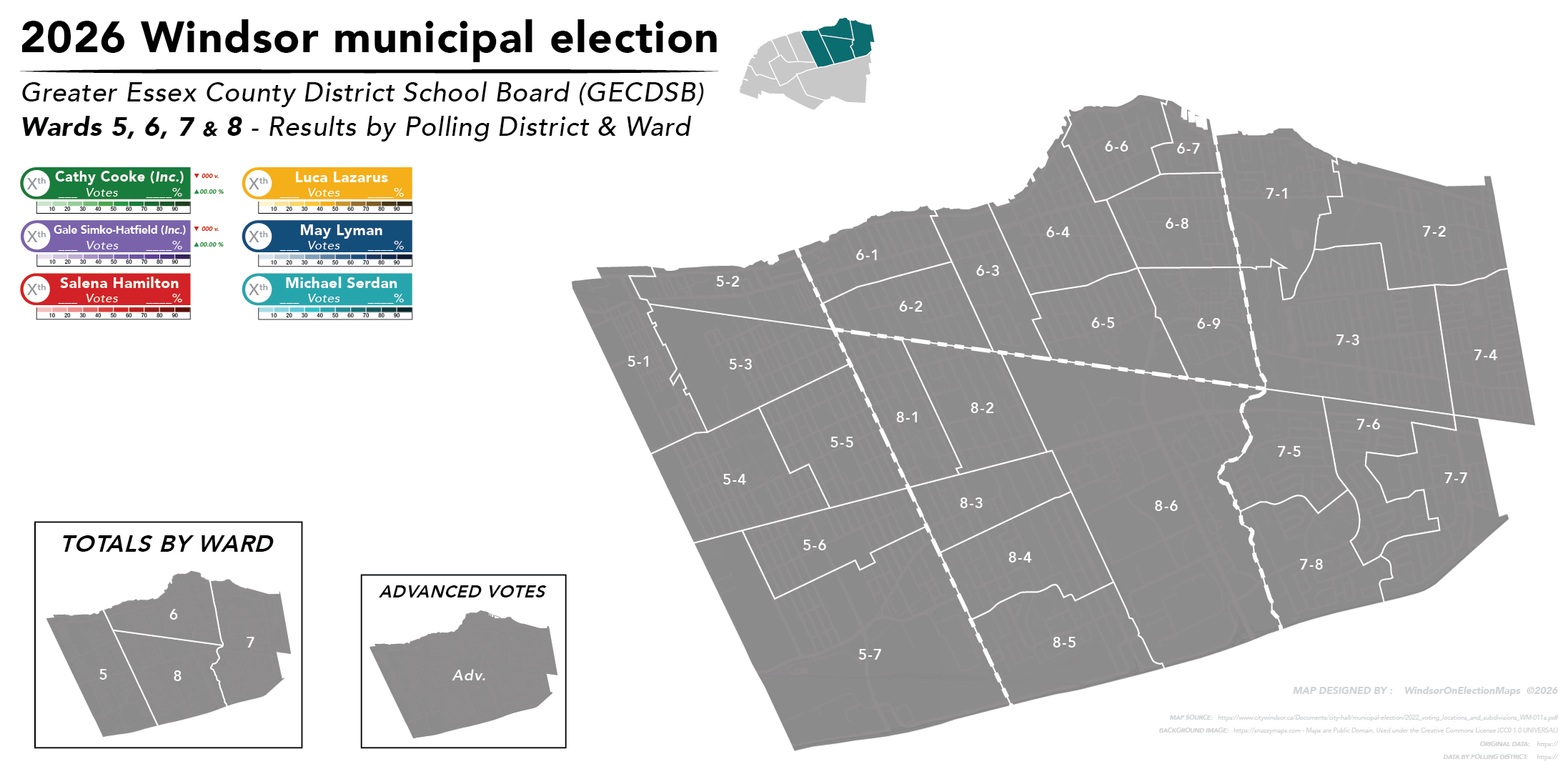
Results of the GECDSB election in Wards 5, 6, 7 & 8. Polling districts are shaded by which candidate gained the majority of the vote.

Candidate (vote for 2)	Popular vote		
Candidate (vote for 2)	Votes	%	±%
Cathy Cooke (X)	TBD	TBD	TBD
Gale Simko Hatfield (X)	TBD	TBD	TBD
Salena Hamilton	TBD	TBD	TBD
Luca Lazarus	TBD	TBD	TBD
May Lyman	TBD	TBD	TBD
Michael Serdan	TBD	TBD	TBD
Total valid votes	TBD	TBD	
Total rejected, unmarked and declined votes	TBD	TBD	
Turnout	TBD	TBD	TBD
Eligible voters	TBD		
Note: Candidate campaign colours are based on the prominent colour used in campaign items (signs, literature, etc.) and are used as a visual differentiation between candidates. Colours from prior party affiliations may be used as well.

== Windsor Essex Catholic District School Board ==
=== Wards 1, 10 ===
Candidate	Popular vote		
Candidate	Votes	%	±%
Fulvio Valentinis (X)	Acclaimed	--	--
Note: Candidate campaign colours are based on the prominent colour used in campaign items (signs, literature, etc.) and are used as a visual differentiation between candidates. Colours from prior party affiliations may be used as well.

=== Wards 2, 9 ===
Candidate	Popular vote		
Candidate	Votes	%	±%
Joe Iacono (X)	TBD	TBD	TBD
Salam Esho	TBD	TBD	TBD
Total valid votes	TBD	TBD	
Total rejected, unmarked and declined votes	TBD	TBD	
Turnout	TBD	TBD	TBD
Eligible voters	TBD		
Note: Candidate campaign colours are based on the prominent colour used in campaign items (signs, literature, etc.) and are used as a visual differentiation between candidates. Colours from prior party affiliations may be used as well.

=== Wards 3, 4 ===
Candidate	Popular vote		
Candidate	Votes	%	±%
Bernard Mastromattei (X)	TBD	TBD	TBD
Juliet Bushi	TBD	TBD	TBD
Total valid votes	TBD	TBD	
Total rejected, unmarked and declined votes	TBD	TBD	
Turnout	TBD	TBD	TBD
Eligible voters	TBD		
Note: Candidate campaign colours are based on the prominent colour used in campaign items (signs, literature, etc.) and are used as a visual differentiation between candidates. Colours from prior party affiliations may be used as well.

=== Wards 5, 8 ===
Candidate	Popular vote		
Candidate	Votes	%	±%
Loona Al-Nordo	TBD	TBD	TBD
Igor Dzaic	TBD	TBD	TBD
Jason Lazarus	TBD	TBD	TBD
Total valid votes	TBD	TBD	
Total rejected, unmarked and declined votes	TBD	TBD	
Turnout	TBD	TBD	TBD
Eligible voters	TBD		
Note: Candidate campaign colours are based on the prominent colour used in campaign items (signs, literature, etc.) and are used as a visual differentiation between candidates. Colours from prior party affiliations may be used as well.

=== Wards 6, 7 ===
Candidate	Popular vote		
Candidate	Votes	%	±%
Kim Bouchard (X)	TBD	TBD	TBD
Ron Dunn	TBD	TBD	TBD
Total valid votes	TBD	TBD	
Total rejected, unmarked and declined votes	TBD	TBD	
Turnout	TBD	TBD	TBD
Eligible voters	TBD		
Note: Candidate campaign colours are based on the prominent colour used in campaign items (signs, literature, etc.) and are used as a visual differentiation between candidates. Colours from prior party affiliations may be used as well.

== Conseil Scolaire Viamonde ==
Candidate	Popular vote		
Candidate	Votes	%	±%
Emmanuelle Richez	Acclaimed	--	--
Note: Candidate campaign colours are based on the prominent colour used in campaign items (signs, literature, etc.) and are used as a visual differentiation between candidates. Colours from prior party affiliations may be used as well.

== Conseil scolaire catholique Providence ==
=== City of Windsor Ward 1, Town of Tecumseh Wards 2 & 5, Town of LaSalle ===
NOTE: Nomination papers are filed in LaSalle.

Candidate	Popular vote		
Candidate	Votes	%	±%
Jacques Kenny	Acclaimed	--	--
Note: Candidate campaign colours are based on the prominent colour used in campaign items (signs, literature, etc.) and are used as a visual differentiation between candidates. Colours from prior party affiliations may be used as well.

=== City of Windsor Wards 2, 3, 4, 5, 10 ===
Candidate	Popular vote		
Candidate	Votes	%	±%
Christine Brooks (X)	Acclaimed	--	--
Note: Candidate campaign colours are based on the prominent colour used in campaign items (signs, literature, etc.) and are used as a visual differentiation between candidates. Colours from prior party affiliations may be used as well.

=== City of Windsor Wards 6, 7, 8, 9 ===
Candidate	Popular vote		
Candidate	Votes	%	±%
Janine Brydges	TBD	TBD	TBD
Émilie Dunnigan	TBD	TBD	TBD
Nadine Lubamba Mungu Kiezila	TBD	TBD	TBD
Total valid votes	TBD	TBD	
Total rejected, unmarked and declined votes	TBD	TBD	
Turnout	TBD	TBD	TBD
Eligible voters	TBD		
Note: Candidate campaign colours are based on the prominent colour used in campaign items (signs, literature, etc.) and are used as a visual differentiation between candidates. Colours from prior party affiliations may be used as well.
