= 2026 Essex County municipal elections =

Local election in Ontario, Canada

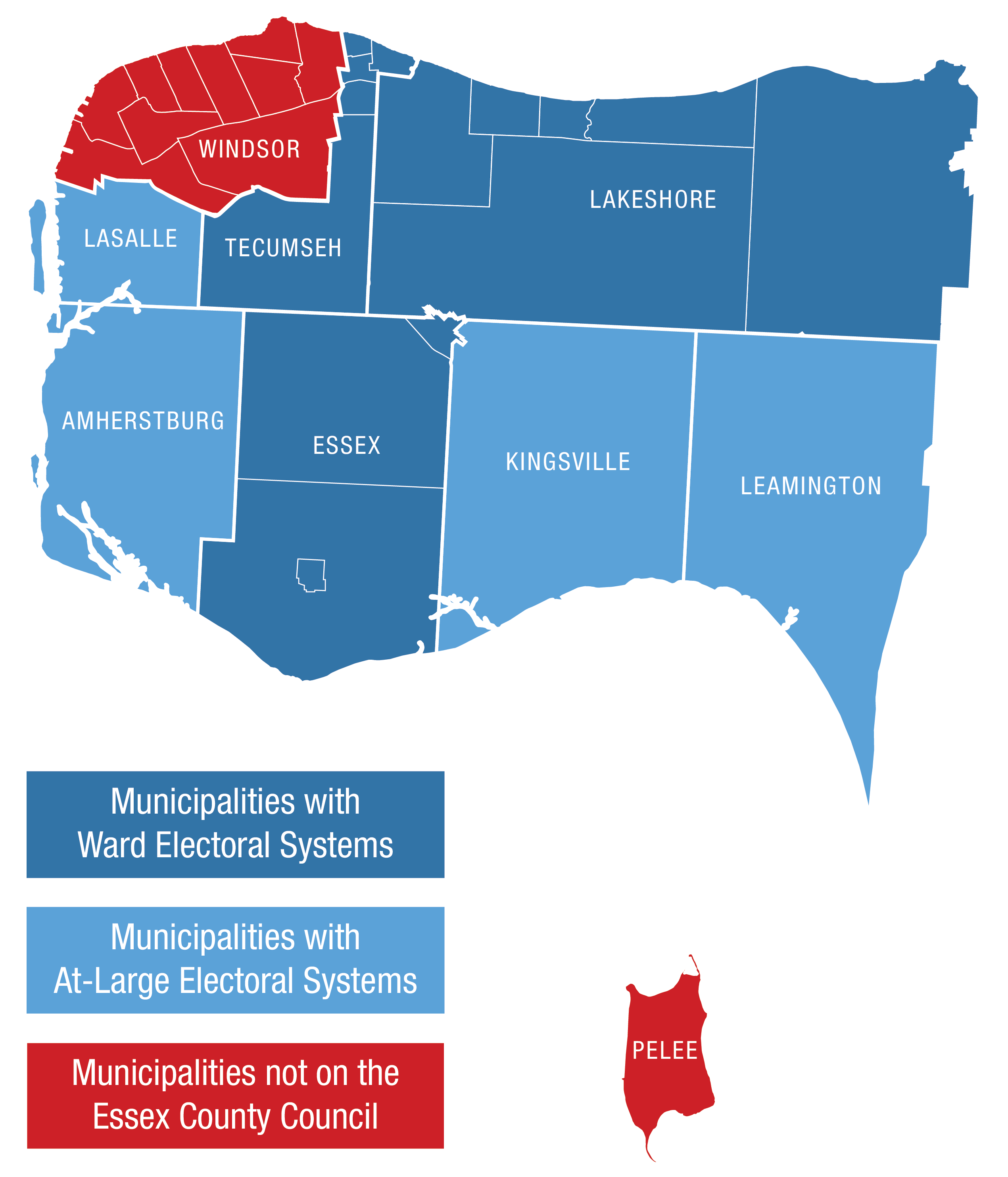
Map of Essex County showing the municipalities that use a Ward system for their Town Councils in Dark Blue, and an At-Large system (with the top 5 placed candidates elected) in Light Blue. Red is the City of Windsor and Pelee Township which are both nominally part of Essex County, but are considered separate municipalities, and do not send members to the Essex County Council.

Municipal elections will be held in Essex County in Ontario on October 26, 2026, in conjunction with municipal elections across the province.

The elections to Windsor's Mayor and City Council will be held concurrently.

(NOTE: Elected candidates are shown in bold. An (X) indicates an incumbent candidate.)

== Essex County Council ==
Essex County Council consists of the 7 mainland mayors of Essex County and their seven deputy mayors.

Position	Elected
Amherstburg Mayor	Chris Gibb
Amherstburg Deputy Mayor	Bill Petruniak
Essex Mayor	Sherry Bondy
Essex Deputy Mayor	Rob Shepley
Kingsville Mayor	Mary Ellen Havlik
Kingsville Deputy Mayor	Kimberly DeYoung
Lakeshore Mayor	Tracey Bailey
Lakeshore Deputy Mayor	Kirk Walstedt
LaSalle Mayor	Michael Macri
LaSalle Deputy Mayor	Michael Akpata
Leamington Mayor	Hilda MacDonald
Leamington Deputy Mayor	Paul Tiessen
Tecumseh Mayor	Joe Bachetti
Tecumseh Deputy Mayor	Tania Jobin

== Amherstburg ==
List of candidates in Amherstburg:

=== Mayor ===
Mayor Michael Prue ran for re-election. Running against him were deputy mayor Chris Gibb, former councillor Frank DiPasquale and 2022 mayoral candidate Frank Cerasa, who was later disqualified due to an insignificant number of endorsement signatures.

Candidate	Popular vote		
Candidate	Votes	%	±%
**Chris Gibb**	**3,928**	**44.06**	TBD
Bill Fryer	3,284	36.83	--
Michael Prue (X)	1,704	19.11	--
~~Frank Cerasa~~ (disqualified) (Note: Frank Ceresa's nomination was rejected after the town's clerk determined one of his 25 endorsements was signed twice by the same person, leaving him one eligible endorsement short of the provincial requirement.)	-	-	--
**Total valid votes**	8,916	—	
**Total rejected, unmarked and declined votes**	112	1.24	
**Turnout**	9,028	41.49	--
**Eligible voters**	21,759		
Note: Candidate campaign colours are based on the prominent colour used in campaign items (signs, literature, etc.) and are used as a visual differentiation between candidates. Colours from prior party affiliations may be used as well.

=== Deputy mayor ===
Candidate	Popular vote		
Candidate	Votes	%	±%
**Bill Petruniak**	**5,146**	**58.91**	TBD
Linden Crain	3,590	41.09	TBD
**Total valid votes**	8,736	—	
**Total rejected, unmarked and declined votes**	292	3.23	
**Turnout**	-	-	--
**Eligible voters**	-		
Note: Candidate campaign colours are based on the prominent colour used in campaign items (signs, literature, etc.) and are used as a visual differentiation between candidates. Colours from prior party affiliations may be used as well.

=== Amherstburg Town Council ===
Candidates (elect 5)	Popular vote		
Candidates (elect 5)	Votes	%	±%
Molly Allaire (X)	TBD	TBD	TBD
Armand Anderson	TBD	TBD	TBD
TJ Botsford	TBD	TBD	TBD
Keith Boussey	TBD	TBD	TBD
Frank Cleminson	TBD	TBD	TBD
Peter Courtney (X)	TBD	TBD	TBD
Jen DeLuca	TBD	TBD	TBD
Lorne Dupuis	TBD	TBD	TBD
Sonya Elliott	TBD	TBD	TBD
Wes Ewer	TBD	TBD	TBD
Saurabh Katara	TBD	TBD	TBD
Lena Lazanja	TBD	TBD	TBD
Shawn Leblanc	TBD	TBD	TBD
Stephanie Pouget-Papak	TBD	TBD	TBD
Dhaval Prajapati	TBD	TBD	TBD
**Total valid votes**	-	—	
**Total rejected, unmarked and declined votes**	-	--	
**Turnout**	-	-	--
**Eligible voters**	-		
Note: Candidate campaign colours are based on the prominent colour used in campaign items (signs, literature, etc.) and are used as a visual differentiation between candidates. Colours from prior party affiliations may be used as well.

== Essex ==
List of candidates in Essex:

=== Mayor ===
Mayor Sherry Bondy ran for re-election.

Candidate	Popular vote		
Candidate	Votes	%	±%
**Sherry Bondy** (X)	**5,288**	**70.56**	TBD
Trevor Menard	2,206	29.44	TBD
**Total valid votes**	7,494	—	
**Total rejected, unmarked and declined votes**	52	0.69	
**Turnout**	7,546	41.47	--
**Eligible voters**	18,197		
Note: Candidate campaign colours are based on the prominent colour used in campaign items (signs, literature, etc.) and are used as a visual differentiation between candidates. Colours from prior party affiliations may be used as well.

=== Deputy mayor ===
Candidate	Popular vote		
Candidate	Votes	%	±%
**Rob Shepley (X)**	**Acclaimed**	--	--
Note: Candidate campaign colours are based on the prominent colour used in campaign items (signs, literature, etc.) and are used as a visual differentiation between candidates. Colours from prior party affiliations may be used as well.

=== Essex Town Council ===
==== Ward 1 ====
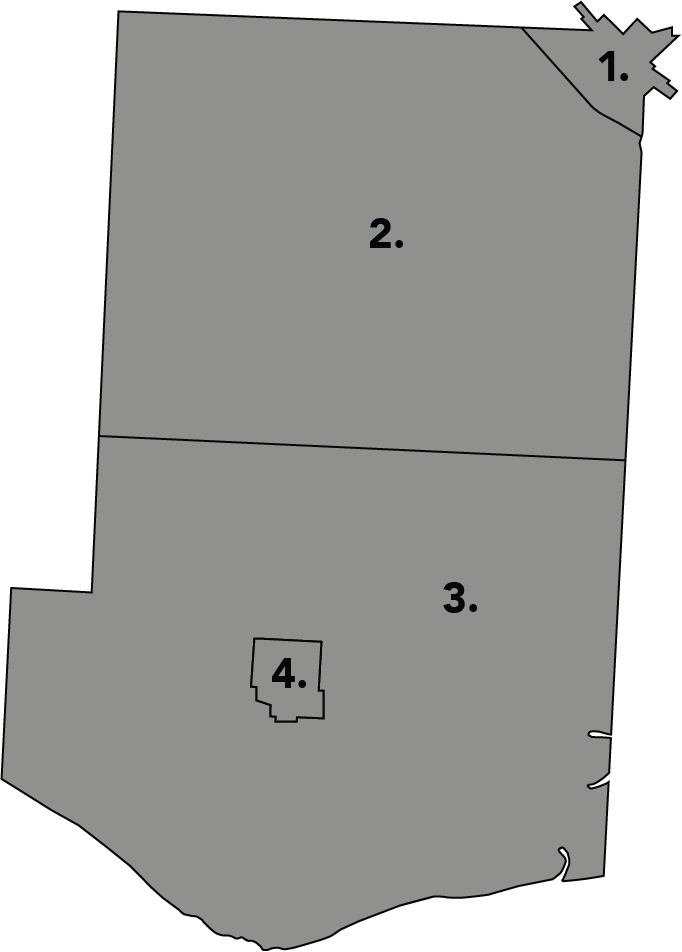
Map of Essex's four wards

Candidates (elect 2)	Popular vote		
Candidates (elect 2)	Votes	%	±%
Katie McGuire-Blais (X)	TBD	TBD	TBD
Joe Garon (X)	TBD	TBD	TBD
Fred Groves	TBD	TBD	TBD
Andrew George	TBD	TBD	TBD
Randy Voakes	TBD	TBD	TBD
**Total valid votes**	-	—	
**Total rejected, unmarked and declined votes**	-	--	
**Turnout**	-	-	--
**Eligible voters**	-		
Note: Candidate campaign colours are based on the prominent colour used in campaign items (signs, literature, etc.) and are used as a visual differentiation between candidates. Colours from prior party affiliations may be used as well.

==== Ward 2 ====
Candidate	Popular vote		
Candidate	Votes	%	±%
Kim Verbeek (X)	TBD	TBD	TBD
Ben Orlando	TBD	TBD	TBD
Justin Power-Colenutt	TBD	TBD	TBD
**Total valid votes**	-	—	
**Total rejected, unmarked and declined votes**	-	--	
**Turnout**	-	-	--
**Eligible voters**	-		
Note: Candidate campaign colours are based on the prominent colour used in campaign items (signs, literature, etc.) and are used as a visual differentiation between candidates. Colours from prior party affiliations may be used as well.

==== Ward 3 ====
Candidates (elect 2)	Popular vote		
Candidates (elect 2)	Votes	%	±%
Jason Matyi (X)	TBD	TBD	TBD
Kyle Lefaive	TBD	TBD	TBD
Corey St-Onge	TBD	TBD	TBD
Chris Vander Doelen	TBD	TBD	TBD
Ron Rogers	TBD	TBD	TBD
Bill Baker	TBD	TBD	TBD
**Total valid votes**	-	—	
**Total rejected, unmarked and declined votes**	-	--	
**Turnout**	-	-	--
**Eligible voters**	-		
Note: Candidate campaign colours are based on the prominent colour used in campaign items (signs, literature, etc.) and are used as a visual differentiation between candidates. Colours from prior party affiliations may be used as well.

==== Ward 4 ====
Candidate	Popular vote		
Candidate	Votes	%	±%
Rodney Hammond (X)	TBD	TBD	TBD
Rachael Mills	TBD	TBD	TBD
Deb Peters	TBD	TBD	TBD
**Total valid votes**	-	—	
**Total rejected, unmarked and declined votes**	-	--	
**Turnout**	-	-	--
**Eligible voters**	-		
Note: Candidate campaign colours are based on the prominent colour used in campaign items (signs, literature, etc.) and are used as a visual differentiation between candidates. Colours from prior party affiliations may be used as well.

== Kingsville ==
List of candidates in Kingsville:

=== Mayor ===
Candidate	Popular vote		
Candidate	Votes	%	±%
**Mary Ellen Havlik**	**2,667**	**33.67**	TBD
Dennis Rogers (X)	2,323	29.32	TBD
Thomas Neufeld	2,148	27.11	TBD
Roshan Nallaratnam	784	9.90	TBD
**Total valid votes**	7,922	—	
**Total rejected, unmarked and declined votes**	59	0.74	
**Turnout**	7,981	41.10	--
**Eligible voters**	19,420		
Note: Candidate campaign colours are based on the prominent colour used in campaign items (signs, literature, etc.) and are used as a visual differentiation between candidates. Colours from prior party affiliations may be used as well.

=== Deputy Mayor ===
Candidate	Popular vote		
Candidate	Votes	%	±%
**Kimberly DeYoung** (X)	**5,177**	**66.56**	TBD
Robert Brando	2,601	33.44	TBD
**Total valid votes**	7,778	—	
**Total rejected, unmarked and declined votes**	203	2.54	
**Turnout**	-	-	--
**Eligible voters**	-		
Note: Candidate campaign colours are based on the prominent colour used in campaign items (signs, literature, etc.) and are used as a visual differentiation between candidates. Colours from prior party affiliations may be used as well.

=== Kingsville Town Council ===
Candidates (Elect 5)	Popular vote		
Candidates (Elect 5)	Votes	%	±%
Janice Durocher	TBD	TBD	TBD
Adam Edwards	TBD	TBD	TBD
Tony Gaffan (X)	TBD	TBD	TBD
Stephen Higgins	TBD	TBD	TBD
Sam Hrutka	TBD	TBD	TBD
Debby Jarvis-Chausse (X)	TBD	TBD	TBD
Sheri Lowrie (X)	TBD	TBD	TBD
John Musselman	TBD	TBD	TBD
Rina Testa-Plancke	TBD	TBD	TBD
**Total valid votes**	-	—	
**Total rejected, unmarked and declined votes**	-	--	
**Turnout**	-	-	--
**Eligible voters**	-		
Note: Candidate campaign colours are based on the prominent colour used in campaign items (signs, literature, etc.) and are used as a visual differentiation between candidates. Colours from prior party affiliations may be used as well.

== Lakeshore ==
The following are the candidates for Mayor, Deputy Mayor, and for Lakeshore Municipal Council.

=== Mayor ===
Candidate	Popular vote		
Candidate	Votes	%	±%
**Tracey Bailey** (X)	**8,399**	**72.53**	TBD
Argo Pace	1,782	15.39	TBD
Sam Sinjari	1,399	12.08	TBD
**Total valid votes**	11,580	—	
**Total rejected, unmarked and declined votes**	-	--	
**Turnout**	-	-	--
**Eligible voters**	-		
Note: Candidate campaign colours are based on the prominent colour used in campaign items (signs, literature, etc.) and are used as a visual differentiation between candidates. Colours from prior party affiliations may be used as well.

=== Deputy Mayor ===
Candidate	Popular vote		
Candidate	Votes	%	±%
**Kirk Walstedt** (X)	**5,472**	**48.19**	TBD
Renay Grant	3,213	28.30	TBD
Dave Monk	2,670	23.51	TBD
**Total valid votes**	11,355	—	
**Total rejected, unmarked and declined votes**	-	--	
**Turnout**	-	-	--
**Eligible voters**	-		
Note: Candidate campaign colours are based on the prominent colour used in campaign items (signs, literature, etc.) and are used as a visual differentiation between candidates. Colours from prior party affiliations may be used as well.

=== Lakeshore Municipal Council ===
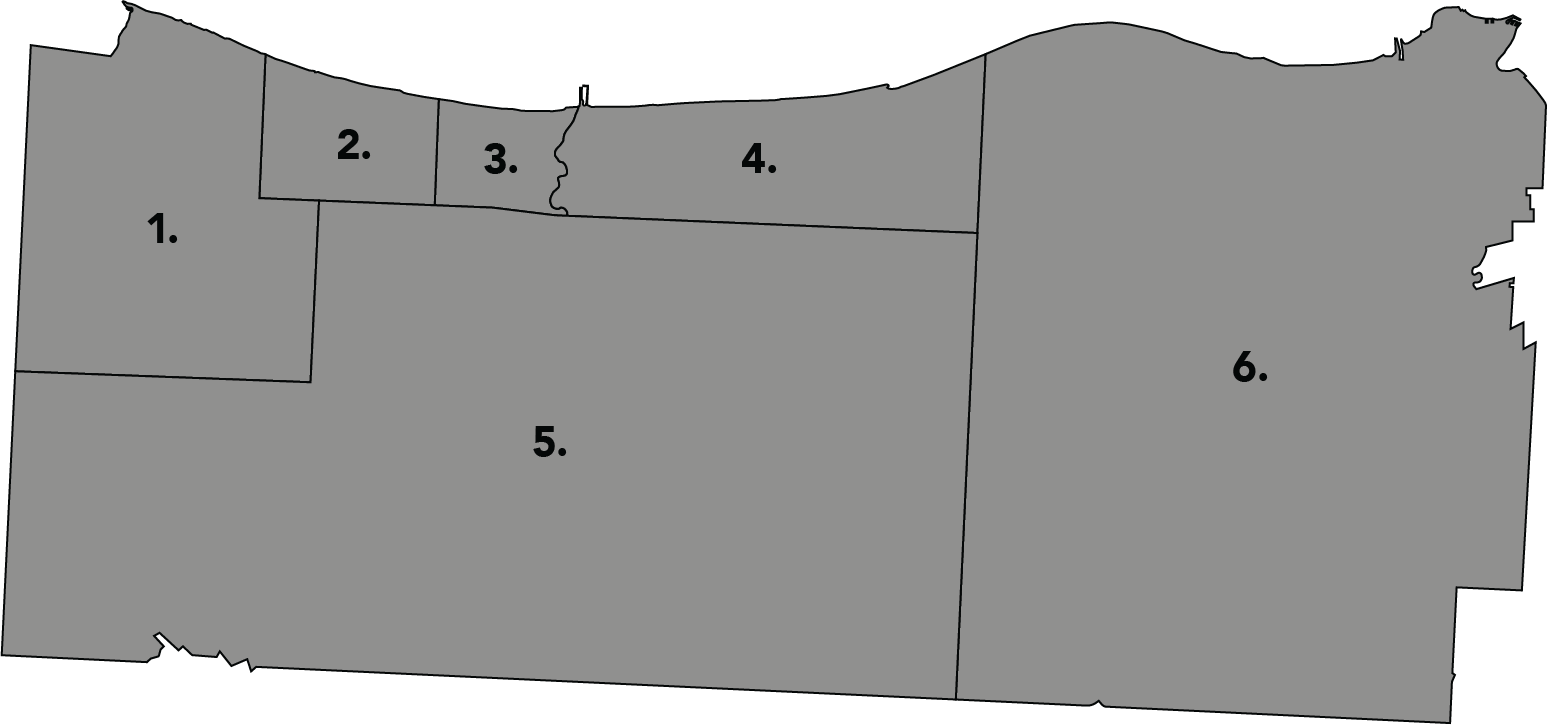
Map of Lakeshore's six wards

==== Ward 1 ====
Candidate	Popular vote		
Candidate	Votes	%	±%
**Ryan Lahoud**	**1,387**	**71.46**	TBD
Ryan McNamara (X)	554	28.54	TBD
**Total valid votes**	1,941	—	
**Total rejected, unmarked and declined votes**	-	--	
**Turnout**	-	-	--
**Eligible voters**	-		
Note: Candidate campaign colours are based on the prominent colour used in campaign items (signs, literature, etc.) and are used as a visual differentiation between candidates. Colours from prior party affiliations may be used as well.

==== Ward 2 ====
Candidate	Popular vote		
Candidate	Votes	%	±%
**Kenneth Poisson**	**690**	**44.98**	TBD
Michael Hoffman (X)	418	27.25	TBD
Joseph Qi	261	17.01	TBD
Owen Crampsie	165	10.76	
**Total valid votes**	1,534	—	
**Total rejected, unmarked and declined votes**	-	--	
**Turnout**	-	-	--
**Eligible voters**	-		
Note: Candidate campaign colours are based on the prominent colour used in campaign items (signs, literature, etc.) and are used as a visual differentiation between candidates. Colours from prior party affiliations may be used as well.

==== Ward 3 ====
Candidate	Popular vote		
Candidate	Votes	%	±%
**Mike Gruszka**	**1,140**	**62.19**	TBD
Kelly Wasylyk	480	26.19	
Rafat Jafri	190	10.37	TBD
Mohamed Seddik	23	1.25	
**Total valid votes**	1,833	—	
**Total rejected, unmarked and declined votes**	-	--	
**Turnout**	-	-	--
**Eligible voters**	-		
Note: Candidate campaign colours are based on the prominent colour used in campaign items (signs, literature, etc.) and are used as a visual differentiation between candidates. Colours from prior party affiliations may be used as well.

==== Ward 4 ====
Candidate	Popular vote		
Candidate	Votes	%	±%
**Dave Gabriele**	**1,238**	**48.47**	TBD
Kelsey Santarossa (X)	1,030	40.33	TBD
Travis Jacques	205	8.03	TBD
Dale Dobson	81	3.17	
**Total valid votes**	2,554	—	
**Total rejected, unmarked and declined votes**	-	--	
**Turnout**	-	-	--
**Eligible voters**	-		
Note: Candidate campaign colours are based on the prominent colour used in campaign items (signs, literature, etc.) and are used as a visual differentiation between candidates. Colours from prior party affiliations may be used as well.

==== Ward 5 ====
Candidate	Popular vote		
Candidate	Votes	%	±%
**Ian Ruston** (X)	**969**	**52.44**	TBD
Tim McDermott	879	47.56	TBD
**Total valid votes**	1,848	—	
**Total rejected, unmarked and declined votes**	-	--	
**Turnout**	-	-	--
**Eligible voters**	-		
Note: Candidate campaign colours are based on the prominent colour used in campaign items (signs, literature, etc.) and are used as a visual differentiation between candidates. Colours from prior party affiliations may be used as well.

==== Ward 6 ====
Candidate	Popular vote		
Candidate	Votes	%	±%
**Larissa Vogler** (X)	**920**	**50.80**	TBD
Louis Tremblay	891	49.20	TBD
**Total valid votes**	1,811	—	
**Total rejected, unmarked and declined votes**	-	--	
**Turnout**	-	-	--
**Eligible voters**	-		
Note: Candidate campaign colours are based on the prominent colour used in campaign items (signs, literature, etc.) and are used as a visual differentiation between candidates. Colours from prior party affiliations may be used as well.

== LaSalle ==
List of candidates in LaSalle:

=== Mayor ===
Candidate	Popular vote		
Candidate	Votes	%	±%
**Michael Macri**	**4,670**	**38.33**	TBD
Crystal Meloche (X)	4,594	37.70	TBD
Shaun Dass	2,921	23.97	TBD
**Total valid votes**	12,185	—	
**Total rejected, unmarked and declined votes**	158	1.28	
**Turnout**	12,343	42.16	--
**Eligible voters**	12,343		
Note: Candidate campaign colours are based on the prominent colour used in campaign items (signs, literature, etc.) and are used as a visual differentiation between candidates. Colours from prior party affiliations may be used as well.

=== Deputy Mayor ===
Candidate	Popular vote		
Candidate	Votes	%	±%
**Michael Akpata** (X)	**5,787**	**50.09**	TBD
Tory McKay	4,014	34.74	TBD
Simon Jacques	1,752	15.16	TBD
**Total valid votes**	11,553	—	
**Total rejected, unmarked and declined votes**	790	6.40	
**Turnout**	-	-	--
**Eligible voters**	-		
Note: Candidate campaign colours are based on the prominent colour used in campaign items (signs, literature, etc.) and are used as a visual differentiation between candidates. Colours from prior party affiliations may be used as well.

=== LaSalle Town Council ===
Candidates (Elect 5)	Popular vote		
Candidates (Elect 5)	Votes	%	±%
Mike Seguin (X)	TBD	TBD	TBD
Kate Paddon	TBD	TBD	TBD
Chris Mattis	TBD	TBD	TBD
Terry Burns (X)	TBD	TBD	TBD
Jason Belanger	TBD	TBD	TBD
Mark Carrick (X)	TBD	TBD	TBD
Brad Krewench	TBD	TBD	TBD
Ivana White	TBD	TBD	TBD
Jeff Renaud (X)	TBD	TBD	TBD
Anita Riccio-Spagnuolo (X)	TBD	TBD	TBD
Robert Moore	TBD	TBD	TBD
**Total valid votes**	-	—	
**Total rejected, unmarked and declined votes**	-	--	
**Turnout**	-	-	--
**Eligible voters**	-		
Note: Candidate campaign colours are based on the prominent colour used in campaign items (signs, literature, etc.) and are used as a visual differentiation between candidates. Colours from prior party affiliations may be used as well.

== Leamington ==
List of candidates in Leamington:

=== Mayor ===
Mayor Hilda MacDonald confirmed she was running for re-election on May 5.

Candidate	Popular vote		
Candidate	Votes	%	±%
**Hilda MacDonald** (X)	**3,365**	**53.22**	TBD
Cris Biron	2,958	46.78	TBD
**Total valid votes**	6,323	—	
**Total rejected, unmarked and declined votes**	154	2.38	
**Turnout**	6,477	30.25	--
**Eligible voters**	21,412		
Note: Candidate campaign colours are based on the prominent colour used in campaign items (signs, literature, etc.) and are used as a visual differentiation between candidates. Colours from prior party affiliations may be used as well.

=== Deputy Mayor ===
Incumbent Deputy mayor Larry Verbeeke announced that he would not be seeking re-election.

Candidate	Popular vote		
Candidate	Votes	%	±%
**Paul Tiessen**	**3,612**	**59.13**	TBD
Dean Wilkinson	2,497	40.87	TBD
**Total valid votes**	6,109	—	
**Total rejected, unmarked and declined votes**	368	5.68	
**Turnout**	-	-	--
**Eligible voters**	-		
Note: Candidate campaign colours are based on the prominent colour used in campaign items (signs, literature, etc.) and are used as a visual differentiation between candidates. Colours from prior party affiliations may be used as well.

=== Leamington Town Council ===
Candidates (elect 5)	Popular vote		
Candidates (elect 5)	Votes	%	±%
Anthony Abraham (X)	TBD	TBD	TBD
Carol Bell	TBD	TBD	TBD
John Biekx	TBD	TBD	TBD
Bill Dunn (X)	TBD	TBD	TBD
Renée Knight	TBD	TBD	TBD
Heather Latam (X)	TBD	TBD	TBD
Bruce Medcalfe	TBD	TBD	TBD
Rielly O’Shaughnessy	TBD	TBD	TBD
Mandy Quiring	TBD	TBD	TBD
Oscar Ramirez	TBD	TBD	TBD
Corey Robertson	TBD	TBD	TBD
Chad Robinson	TBD	TBD	TBD
Tim Wilkinson	TBD	TBD	TBD
Nigel Williams	TBD	TBD	TBD
**Total valid votes**	-	—	
**Total rejected, unmarked and declined votes**	-	--	
**Turnout**	-	-	--
**Eligible voters**	-		
Note: Candidate campaign colours are based on the prominent colour used in campaign items (signs, literature, etc.) and are used as a visual differentiation between candidates. Colours from prior party affiliations may be used as well.

== Tecumseh ==
List of candidates in Tecumseh:

=== Mayor ===
Incumbent mayor Gary McNamara ran for re-election. Running against him was deputy mayor Joe Bachetti.

Candidate	Popular vote		
Candidate	Votes	%	±%
**Joe Bachetti**	**7,017**	**72.18**	TBD
Gary McNamara (X)	2,704	27.82	TBD
**Total valid votes**	9,721	—	
**Total rejected, unmarked and declined votes**	71	0.73	
**Turnout**	9,792	47.44	--
**Eligible voters**	20,642		
Note: Candidate campaign colours are based on the prominent colour used in campaign items (signs, literature, etc.) and are used as a visual differentiation between candidates. Colours from prior party affiliations may be used as well.

=== Deputy Mayor ===
Candidate	Popular vote		
Candidate	Votes	%	±%
**Tania Jobin**	**5,773**	**61.87**	TBD
Larry Morand	3,558	38.13	TBD
**Total valid votes**	9,331	—	
**Total rejected, unmarked and declined votes**	461	4.71	
**Turnout**	-	-	--
**Eligible voters**	-		
Note: Candidate campaign colours are based on the prominent colour used in campaign items (signs, literature, etc.) and are used as a visual differentiation between candidates. Colours from prior party affiliations may be used as well.

=== Tecumseh Town Council ===
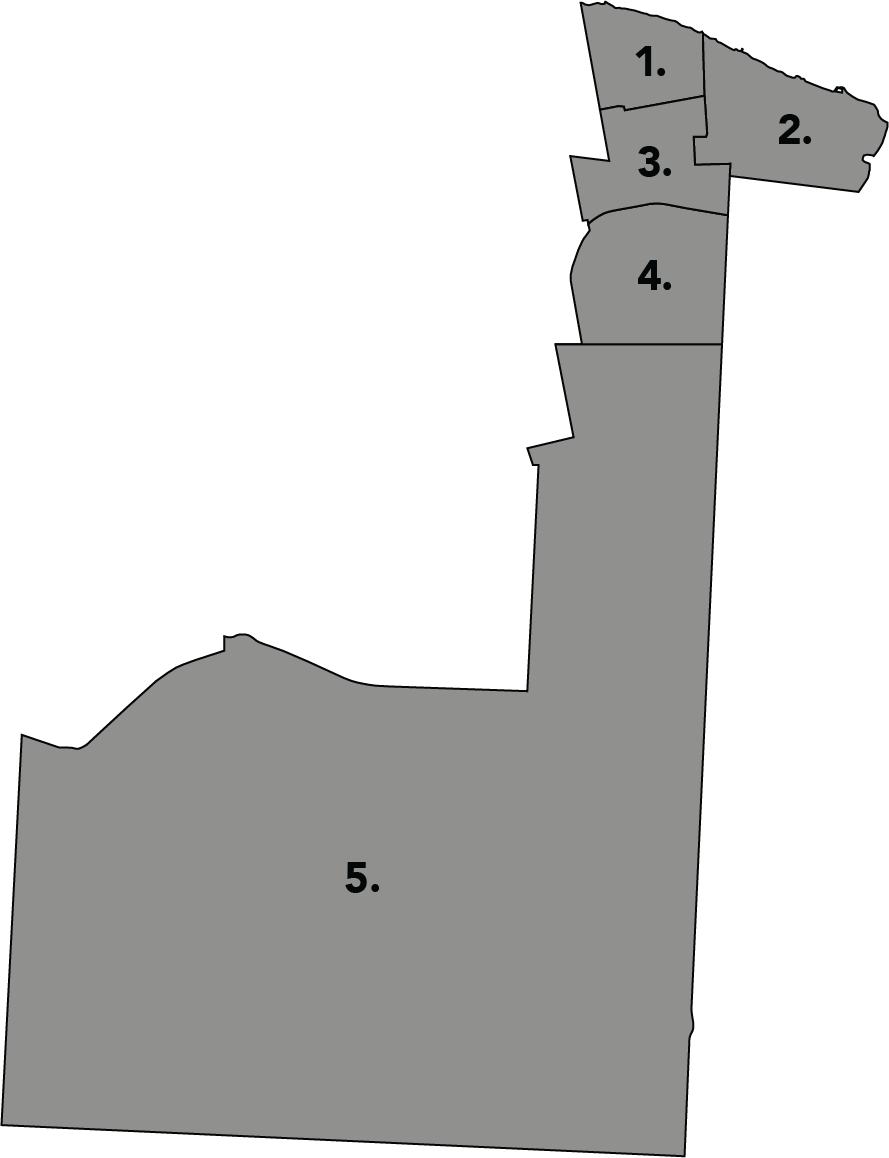
Map of Tecumseh's five wards.

==== Ward 1 ====
Candidate	Popular vote		
Candidate	Votes	%	±%
Darrin Drouillard	TBD	TBD	TBD
To be announced	TBD	TBD	TBD
**Total valid votes**	-	—	
**Total rejected, unmarked and declined votes**	-	--	
**Turnout**	-	-	--
**Eligible voters**	-		
Note: Candidate campaign colours are based on the prominent colour used in campaign items (signs, literature, etc.) and are used as a visual differentiation between candidates. Colours from prior party affiliations may be used as well.

==== Ward 2 ====
Candidate	Popular vote		
Candidate	Votes	%	±%
James Dorner (X)	TBD	TBD	TBD
Mike Lamoureux	TBD	TBD	TBD
Antoni Tambunan	TBD	TBD	TBD
To be announced	TBD	TBD	TBD
**Total valid votes**	-	—	
**Total rejected, unmarked and declined votes**	-	--	
**Turnout**	-	-	--
**Eligible voters**	-		
Note: Candidate campaign colours are based on the prominent colour used in campaign items (signs, literature, etc.) and are used as a visual differentiation between candidates. Colours from prior party affiliations may be used as well.

==== Ward 3 ====
Candidate	Popular vote		
Candidate	Votes	%	±%
Leo Demarce	TBD	TBD	TBD
Chris Elliott	TBD	TBD	TBD
Alex Ilijoski	TBD	TBD	TBD
To be announced	TBD	TBD	TBD
**Total valid votes**	-	—	
**Total rejected, unmarked and declined votes**	-	--	
**Turnout**	-	-	--
**Eligible voters**	-		
Note: Candidate campaign colours are based on the prominent colour used in campaign items (signs, literature, etc.) and are used as a visual differentiation between candidates. Colours from prior party affiliations may be used as well.

==== Ward 4 ====
Candidate	Popular vote		
Candidate	Votes	%	±%
Brian Houston (X)	TBD	TBD	TBD
Cheryl Hardcastle	TBD	TBD	TBD
To be announced	TBD	TBD	TBD
**Total valid votes**	-	—	
**Total rejected, unmarked and declined votes**	-	--	
**Turnout**	-	-	--
**Eligible voters**	-		
Note: Candidate campaign colours are based on the prominent colour used in campaign items (signs, literature, etc.) and are used as a visual differentiation between candidates. Colours from prior party affiliations may be used as well.

==== Ward 5 ====
Candidate	Popular vote		
Candidate	Votes	%	±%
Marisa Nabbout	TBD	TBD	TBD
To be announced	TBD	TBD	TBD
**Total valid votes**	-	—	
**Total rejected, unmarked and declined votes**	-	--	
**Turnout**	-	-	--
**Eligible voters**	-		
Note: Candidate campaign colours are based on the prominent colour used in campaign items (signs, literature, etc.) and are used as a visual differentiation between candidates. Colours from prior party affiliations may be used as well.
