= Fred Francis =

- Francis in 2026
- 35th Mayor of Windsor
- Assumed office November 15, 2026
- Preceded by: Drew Dilkens

Personal details
- Born: November 22, 1980 (age 45) Windsor, Ontario, Canada
- Party: Independent
- Spouse: Carolyn Francis
- Relatives: Eddie Francis (brother)

Fred Francis (born 22 November 1980) is a Canadian politician who is currently serving as the mayor of Windsor, Ontario. He served three terms on the Windsor City Council (2014–2026) before being elected mayor in the 2026 municipal election. His brother Eddie previously served as mayor.

== Biography ==
=== Early life ===
Francis was born in Windsor, Ontario, on November 22, 1980, the third son of Lebanese immigrants Farid and Arlette Francis. He grew up in South Windsor, where he completed his elementary studies at Notre Dame Catholic Elementary School and his secondary studies at Holy Names Catholic High School. He attended the University of Western Ontario in London, Ontario, graduating in 2003 with a combined major in history and political science. He received a master of arts degree in history from the University of Windsor in 2006 and a bachelor of education degree in 2009.

In 2014, Francis was elected to represent Ward 1 on the Windsor City Council. He was re-elected in 2018 and 2022, and also served as the executive director of the Multicultural Council of Windsor and Essex County. Early in his second term, Francis was diagnosed with Hodgkin lymphoma, and as a result balanced council duties with chemotherapy; to minimize the impact of fatigue on his work, he scheduled his chemotherapy sessions for Fridays, allowing the weekends to be periods of rest. After his diagnosis, he worked with the Windsor Cancer Centre Foundation as an ambassador for cancer awareness. In 2023, Francis was declared cancer-free.

=== Mayorality ===
Francis delivering his inaugural speech at the Capitol Theatre, November 16, 2026

Francis contested the mayorality of Windsor in the city's 2026 election. His platform, which he characterized as a "new direction", included ending the use of strong mayor powers, rejuvenating the city centre, improving transit and community safety, and promoting affordability. Francis won the election, unseating twelve-year incumbent Drew Dilkens, with 28,204 votes to Dilkens's 20,021. The Ward 1 council seat was taken by Darcie Renaud.

The new council term began on November 15, 2026, after a transitionary period that Francis described as "jam-packed". He took his oath of office on November 16, 2026, during a ceremony at the Capitol Theatre, On his first day in office, he devolved strong mayor powers to return authority to city council. In his inaugural address, he promised an end to "the era of costly legacy projects" and emphasized an intent to promote accountability and transparency by allowing "every resident to feel that city hall listens, responds, and delivers."

== Political positions ==
Francis described himself in 2026 as having "never been part of a political party", and leaning centre-right on fiscal matters and centre-left on social ones. Francis has spoken against strong mayor powers, deeming them to sideline city councillors; he described Dilkens's use of such powers to overrule city council and discontinue bus service between Windsor and Detroit, Michigan, as "a sad day for democracy". According to Trevor Wilhelm of The Windsor Star, Francis had a conservative track record as city councillor. Wilhelm thus describes his hiring of Brian Masse—a former member of parliament from the New Democratic Party—as campaign manager as a potentially "unlikely alliance".

== Personal life ==
Francis married Carolyn in 2021. His elder brother Eddie served as mayor of Windsor from 2003 until 2014.

== Electoral results ==
2014 Windsor municipal election results, Ward 1

Candidate	Total votes	% of total votes
Fred Francis	2,953	36.57
Ryan Mancini	2,370	29.35
Matt Ford	1,112	13.77
Denis Clair Ghanam	775	9.58
Daniel Ableser	397	4.92
Gurbax Bhullar	396	4.90
David Hanna	74	0.92

2018 Windsor municipal election results, Ward 1

Candidate	Total votes	% of total votes
Fred Francis	3,507	52.92
Darcie Renaud	2,167	32.70
Matt Ford	428	6.46
Wiquar Husain	277	4.18
Krysta Glovasky-Ridsdale	248	3.74

2022 Windsor municipal election results, Ward 1

Candidate	Total votes	% of total votes
Fred Francis	3,481	55.70
Darcie Renaud	2,769	44.30

Francis (left) in 2026 with his predecessor, Drew Dilkens

2026 Windsor municipal election results, Mayor of Windsor

Candidate	Total votes	% of total votes
Fred Francis	28,204	47.64
Drew Dilkens	20,021	33.82
Kat Pasquatch	7,253	12.25
Tara Grayer	878	1.48
Nick Kolasky	640	1.08
Patrick Sutherland	592	1.00
Benjamin Danyluk	538	0.91
Aaron Day	420	0.71
Dylon Graves	304	0.51
Tristan Ty Morencie	182	0.31
Louis Vaupotic	169	0.29

== Works cited ==
- "2026 Windsor Election – Mayor". City of Windsor. 2026. Archived from the original on November 14, 2026.
- Archibald, Dalson (November 17, 2026). "Windsor Mayor Fred Francis First Day Ushers in New Era at City Hall". CTV News. Archived from the original on November 17, 2026.
- Campbell, Chris (November 6, 2026). "Francis Preparing to Take Over as Windsor Mayor as Transition with Dilkens Gets Underway". CTV News. Archived from the original on November 14, 2026.
- Campbell, Taylor (September 30, 2023). "Windsor Councillor Fred Francis Declares Victory over Cancer 'Demons'". The Windsor Star.
- Chen, Dalson (November 17, 2026). "Inaugural Address by Mayor Fred Francis Envisions a New Style of Leadership for Windsor". CBC. Archived from the original on November 17, 2026.
- "Councillor Fred Francis". City of Windsor. Archived from the original on November 14, 2026.
- Ensing, Chris (February 21, 2025). "'A Sad Day for Democracy,' Councillor Says as Effort to Override Tunnel Bus Veto Fails". CBC. Archived from the original on November 14, 2026.
- "Fred Francis Staying Positive after 12 Chemo Sessions Completed". CBC. June 17, 2019. Archived from the original on November 14, 2026.
- "Mayor Eddie Francis Leaves Mark on 2014 Municipal Campaign". CBC. October 27, 2014. Archived from the original on November 14, 2026.
- Kitching, Heather (October 27, 2026). "Fred Francis to Lead a new Windsor Council Comprised Equally of Veterans and New Faces". CBC. Archived from the original on November 14, 2026.
- "Official Results, City of Windsor October 27, 2014, Municipal Election" (PDF). City of Windsor. 2014. Archived from the original (PDF) on March 7, 2024.
- "Official Results, City of Windsor October 22, 2018, Municipal Election" (PDF). City of Windsor. 2018. Archived from the original (PDF) on May 22, 2023.
- "Official Results, City of Windsor October 24, 2022, Municipal Election" (PDF). City of Windsor. 2022. Archived from the original (PDF) on November 14, 2026.
- Veneza, Ricardo (October 26, 2026). "Windsorites Choose Change in Electing Fred Francis as New Mayor". AM 800 CKLW. Archived from the original on November 14, 2026.
- Wilhelm, Trevor (August 9, 2026). "Political Odd Couple? Fred Francis Appoints Brian Masse as His Mayoral Campaign Manager". The Windsor Star. Archived from the original on November 14, 2026.
