= Eddie Francis =

Canadian mayor

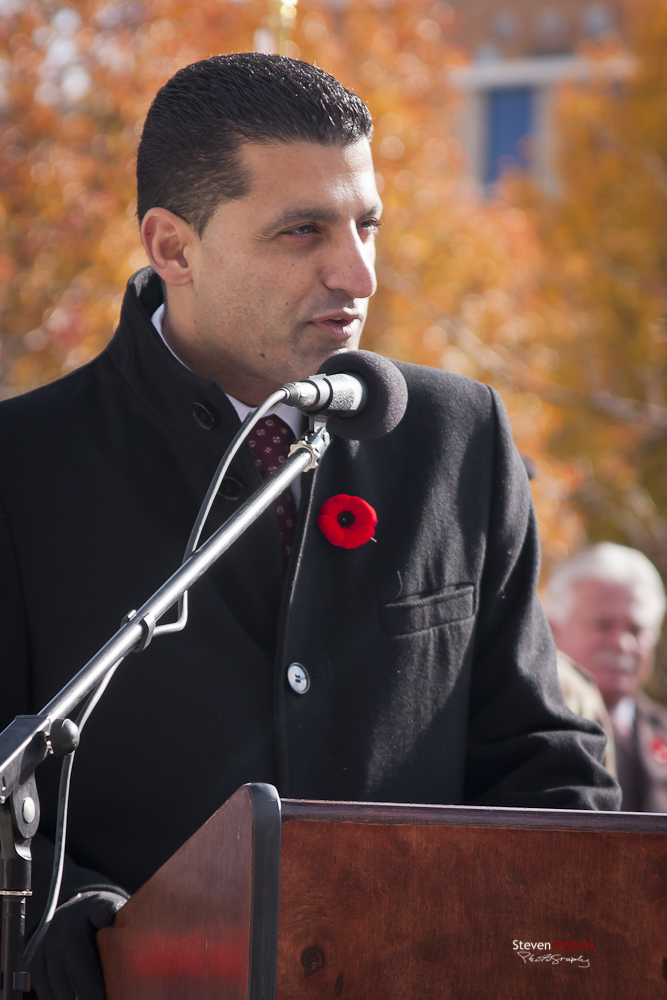
- Francis in 2011

33rd Mayor of Windsor
- In office December 1, 2003 – November 30, 2014
- Preceded by: Mike Hurst
- Succeeded by: Drew Dilkens

Personal details
- Born: Edgar Francis; May 1974 (age 52) Windsor, Ontario, Canada
- Education: University of Western Ontario (BSc); University of Windsor (LLB)
- Profession: lawyer, entrepreneur

Edgar "Eddie" Francis (born May 1974) is a Canadian businessman and former politician. He previously served as mayor of Windsor, Ontario. He was 29 years old when he was elected mayor in 2003, the second-youngest mayor in Windsor's history and one of the youngest mayors ever elected in Canada. He is also Windsor's first Lebanese-Canadian mayor. He is currently the chief executive officer of WFCU Credit Union.

== Background ==
Born in Windsor to Lebanese Maronite Catholic parents who had recently immigrated to Canada from Lebanon, Francis is fluent in both English and Arabic.

Francis is an alumnus of Notre Dame Elementary School and Holy Names Catholic High School, both in Windsor. While in high school, Francis was a major contributor to student life while participating in the student council, and held the office of student body president. He holds a combined honour's degree in chemistry and biochemistry from the University of Western Ontario. He graduated from the University of Windsor Law School and was called to the Bar in 2002.

Prior to entering politics, Francis ran and operated Royal Pita Baking Company with his brothers. Under their stewardship the "mom and pop" operation's distribution quickly expanded to other markets, including London, Ontario, Toronto and 12 U.S. states.

Francis' brother Fred was later elected to the Windsor City Council in 2014, the year Eddie left office as mayor. Fred served three terms as a councillor representing Ward 1 before being elected mayor himself in 2026.

== Councillor ==
Francis was first elected to Windsor City Council in a by-election in June 1999, following the resignation of Rick Limoges. He became the youngest city councillor in Windsor's history, beating a record previously held by Limoges, when he was chosen to represent Ward 5 (Riverside / Forest Glade) at the age of 25. Shortly after being elected to city council, Francis enrolled in the University of Windsor Law School. He graduated in 2002 and articled with the international law firm of Miller Canfield Paddock and Stone. Subsequently, Francis was called to the Bar of the Law Society of Upper Canada.

In the November 2000 general election, Francis was re-elected to his Ward 5 seat with the largest majority ever recorded in a Windsor municipal election. As an active member of city council, Francis was involved in many of the city's major committees, agencies and boards. He held the positions of director of Windsor Canada Utilities, member of the Detroit–Windsor Tunnel Commission, chair of the Windsor Licensing Commission and chair of the International Relations Committee.

== Mayoralty ==
Francis was first elected mayor in the 2003 municipal election, winning narrowly over fellow councillor Bill Marra. At 29 years old, Francis became Windsor's second-youngest mayor, behind Daniell Willis Mason, who was 26 years old when he was elected as Mayor in 1895.

One of his first acts as mayor was to join the planning committee for the 2006 Super Bowl festivities in Detroit, ensuring that Windsor would receive some of the economic benefits of participating in a major tourist event.

He was subsequently re-elected in the 2006 election, garnering 77.56 per cent of the votes cast in the mayoral race, for which 38.2 per cent of registered voters cast a ballot. He won again in the 2010 election, with 56.17% of the vote.

During Francis' mayoralty, Windsor has consistently reduced municipal debt and passed six consecutive budgets with zero tax increases.

In March 2014, Francis announced he would not be running for a fourth term, and left office that year having served 11 years as mayor. This made him the second longest serving mayor in Windsor's history (behind Arthur Reaume, who served for 13 years from 1941 to 1954.)

Francis became executive vice-president of the Windsor Family Credit Union beginning on December 1, 2014. He is CEO of the WFCU.

=== Waterfront marina ===
On July 29, 2008, Francis announced one of the most ambitious projects of his mayoral term, a waterfront redevelopment proposal which would transform a struggling section of downtown Windsor into a waterfront park by converting the block bounded by Crawford, Caron and University Avenues — an area which currently consists primarily of parking lots and a disused section of railway track — into an inland marina cut back from the Detroit River, and converting either Chatham Street or Pitt Street into a canal and adjoining boardwalk, which would extend easterly for three blocks from the marina to a spot near the Art Gallery of Windsor, and then from there back to the river at the eastern edge of Dieppe Park.

He appointed Dave Cooke, a former Member of Provincial Parliament, to chair a feasibility study on the proposal. On August 19, councillor Alan Halberstadt criticized Francis for allegedly being secretive about the plan, and in response Cooke was brought in to speak to city council about the plan on September 2.

The project was never commissioned, lacking public support and funding.

=== Relationship with Detroit during the Kilpatrick crisis ===
On August 7, 2008, Detroit mayor Kwame Kilpatrick, already in the midst of pending felony charges, was jailed for violating his bail conditions after travelling to Windsor on July 23 for a meeting with Francis regarding a proposed deal pertaining to the Detroit–Windsor Tunnel, which would have seen the city of Windsor take over operational control of the tunnel in exchange for a $75 million loan to the cash-strapped city of Detroit. Kilpatrick stated that Francis had requested the meeting on short notice, while Francis and other city bureaucrats indicated that the meeting had in fact been at Kilpatrick's request. The meeting resulted in a 14-month investigation by Windsor's Integrity Commissioner, Earl Basse, who cleared Francis of wrongdoing in his relationship with Kilpatrick.

Francis later stated that he was confident that Kilpatrick's resignation on September 4 would not threaten the tunnel deal, indicating that he also had a strong working relationship with Kilpatrick's successor, Ken Cockrel. However, Cockrel himself indicated that he would prefer to renegotiate an alternate agreement to maintain joint management of the tunnel between the two cities.

Following Detroit's July 2013 bankruptcy filing, Francis said that his city would consider purchasing Detroit's half of the Detroit–Windsor Tunnel if it was offered for sale.

== Electoral record ==
1999 Windsor Ward 5 by-election (June 13, 1999)
| Candidate | Votes | % |
|---|---|---|
| Eddie Francis | 1,822 | 25.43% |
| Jo-Anne Gignac | 1,507 | 21.03% |
| Gale Simko Hatfield | 1,370 | 19.12% |
| Frank Battal | 663 | 9.25% |
| Larry Macneil | 608 | 8.48% |
| Al Nelman | 388 | 5.41% |
| Michael Gladstone-White | 240 | 3.35% |
| Douglas Kenney | 173 | 2.41% |
| Tom Toth | 108 | 1.51% |
| Ernie "The Baconman" Lamont | 72 | 1.00% |
| Duncan Boutilier | 69 | 0.96% |
| John Rutherford | 40 | 0.56% |
| James Whyte | 38 | 0.53% |
| John Brown | 33 | 0.46% |
| Steve Farrell | 22 | 0.31% |
| Louis Lapensee | 13 | 0.18% |
Source: City of Windsor

NOTE: (X) Indicates an incumbent candidate.

2000 Windsor municipal election: Council, Ward 5 (two members elected)
| Candidate | Votes | % |
|---|---|---|
| Eddie Francis (X) | 10,797 | 45.56% |
| Tom Wilson (X) | 7,801 | 32.91% |
| Mary-Jane Limoges | 5,103 | 21.53% |
Source: City of Windsor

2003 Windsor Mayoral election
| Candidate | Votes | % |
|---|---|---|
| Eddie Francis | 39,042 | 53.45% |
| Bill Marra | 31,517 | 43.15% |
| Ernie "The Baconman" Lamont | 2,484 | 3.40% |
| Turnout: | | |
Source: City of Windsor

2006 Windsor mayoral election
| Candidate | Votes | % |
|---|---|---|
| Eddie Francis (X) | 44,527 | 77.56% |
| David Wonham | 10,308 | 17.95% |
| Mohamad Chams | 1,502 | 2.62% |
| Mohamad-Ali Beydoun | 1,074 | 1.87% |
| Turnout: | 38.20% | |
Source: City of Windsor

2010 Windsor mayoral election
| Candidate | Votes | % |
|---|---|---|
| Eddie Francis (X) | 39,384 | 56.17% |
| Rick Limoges | 28,354 | 40.44% |
| Anthony Brothers | 979 | 1.40% |
| Michael Mosgrove | 748 | 1.07% |
| Robert W. Vinson | 377 | 0.54% |
| Sam Sinjari | 273 | 0.39% |
| Turnout: | 46.28% | |
Source: City of Windsor
