= Drew Dilkens =

Canadian politician (born 1972)

- Dilkens in 2026
- 34th Mayor of Windsor
- In office December 1, 2014 – November 15, 2026
- Preceded by: Eddie Francis
- Succeeded by: Fred Francis

Personal details
- Born: Andrew Dilkens; 1972 (age 53–54) Windsor, Ontario, Canada
- Party: Independent
- Spouse: Jane Deneau
- Children: 2
- Education: University of Windsor (BComm); University of Windsor (LLB); Wayne State University (MBA); International School of Management (DBA)
- Profession: Lawyer (Non-Practising)
- Website: www.mayordrewdilkens.ca

Andrew "Drew" Dilkens is a Canadian politician who previously served as the 34th mayor of Windsor, Ontario. He was elected mayor in the city's 2014 municipal election , and served for three consecutive terms before losing the 2026 mayoral election to Fred Francis.

== Biography ==
Dilkens studied at the University of Windsor, earning a Bachelor of Commerce degree and a law degree. He was called to the bar in 2012. He then studied at Wayne State University where he obtained a Masters of Business Administration, and at the International School of Management in Paris, where he obtained a Doctorate of Business Administration. In 2021, he earned the Chartered Director (C.Dir.) designation. Dilkens holds the designation of Certified Human Resources Leader, and has training certificates from the Canadian Foreign Service Institute and the Canadian Securities Institute and Federal Bureau of Investigation in the United States.

Before being elected mayor, Dilkens was elected in 2006 to serve as a city councillor for Ward 1 from 2006 to 2014. He ran largely on a campaign of continuing the policy agenda of outgoing mayor Eddie Francis. During his time on City Council, Dilkens chaired the International Relations Committee and the Essex Windsor Solid Waste Authority.

Dilkens is married to Jane Deneau, and has two children.

== Mayor of Windsor ==
=== Road infrastructure and flood prevention ===
In August 2017, the City of Windsor received a record-breaking rainstorm, flooding 6000 basements. Dilkens was criticized for promoting a $3 million project to create a Christmas lights display amidst the mass flooding. Critics claimed that the city was responsible for the flooding by not properly investing in infrastructure, pressuring the city to re-invest the lights display fund. Mayor Dilkens dismissed the critics, stating: "There will be folks who will criticize lots of different decisions". Mayor Dilkens also noted that the City of Windsor has invested $12 million to the flooding prevention program. However, council eventually voted to roll back the budget of the Christmas display to $1.5 million. Between 2021 and 2022 over 100,000 people attended the event. In 2022, Canadian Special Events magazine released its list of the 2022 Canadian Event Awards Finalists with Bright Lights Windsor being nominated for both Best Outdoor Event, and Most Outstanding Event.

In response to the storm, Dilkens presented an eight-point plan to address flooding in the City of Windsor. This plan set in motion the city's Master Sewer Plan, which enables the city to identify issues, find solutions, and execute major sewer projects. The total cost of the sewer master plan is $5 billion.

=== COVID-19 pandemic ===
The City of Windsor's response to the pandemic included:

- Declaration of a state of emergency
- Ordering the temporary closure of malls and shopping centers
- Launching a Small Business Action Plan, waiving some permit fees
- Advocating for the elimination of time-of-use electricity rates
- Temporarily closing all community centres and libraries
- Supporting the June 27th Miracle food drive
- Launching #TakeoutTuesday to support small businesses and restaurants.
- Temporary closure of all public transit across the city.

=== Economy ===
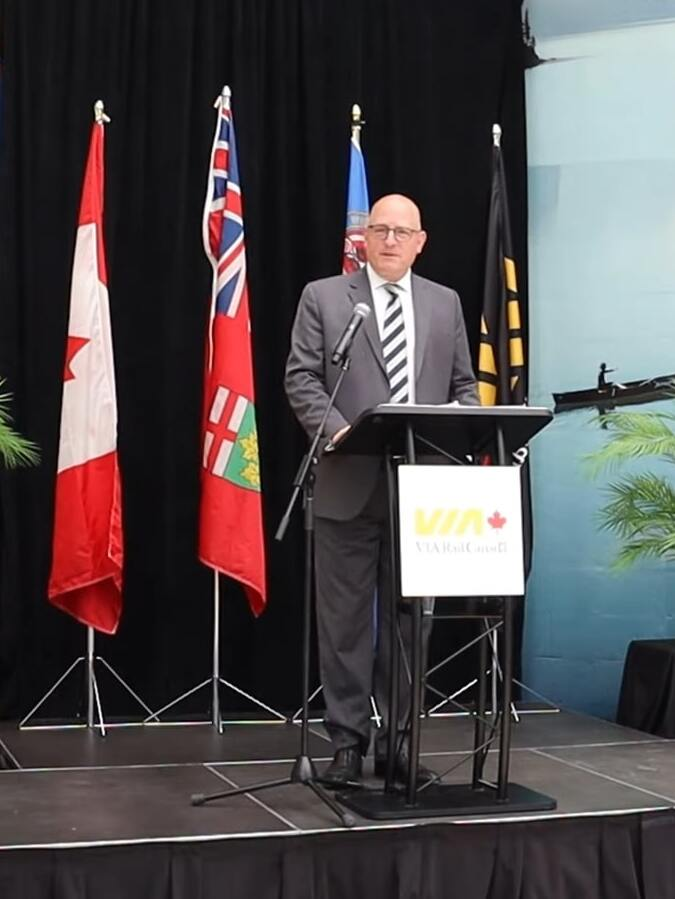
Dilkens at a VIA Rail announcement in Windsor, 2024

When running for re-election in 2018, Dilkens promised to "hold the line" on taxes, meaning to keep the municipal tax rate below the rate of inflation. From 2014 to 2018, the city budget increased 2.4 per cent under Dilkens' watch. Dilkens claimed that the city's tax policy has helped save taxpayers $659-million since 2008. In subsequent years, tax increases were below 2 percent, the target inflation rate, with the exception of 2020 which saw an increase of 2.1 per cent. These tax increases are notably lower than those that surrounding municipalities implemented.

In March 2022, Dilkens helped in securing a $5-billion investment for Canada's first domestic EV battery manufacturing facility. Once created, the plant will employ 2,500 people. In addition, it is expected that spinoff jobs created in the supply chain will be between 10,000 and 17,500.

In May 2022, Dilkens joined Premier Ford, Prime Minister Justin Trudeau, cabinet ministers, and Stellantis executives to announce Stellantis' $3.6-billion investment towards modernizing their assembly plant to accommodate for the production of electric vehicles, while also building two new research and development centres. Through the new centres, 650 jobs will be created and third-shift operations will return once retooling is complete.

In June 2022, Dilkens joined Dongshin Motech Ltd. CEO Choon Woo Lim to approve their lease terms and Letter of Intent to build a $60-million, 170,000-square-foot manufacturing facility. This new space will produce highly specialized aluminium casings for the electric vehicle batteries at the LGES-Stellantis EV Battery Production Facility and provide 300 new jobs.

In 2026, Dilkens disputed the Trump administration's stance on the Gordie Howe International Bridge opening.

=== Regional acute care hospital ===
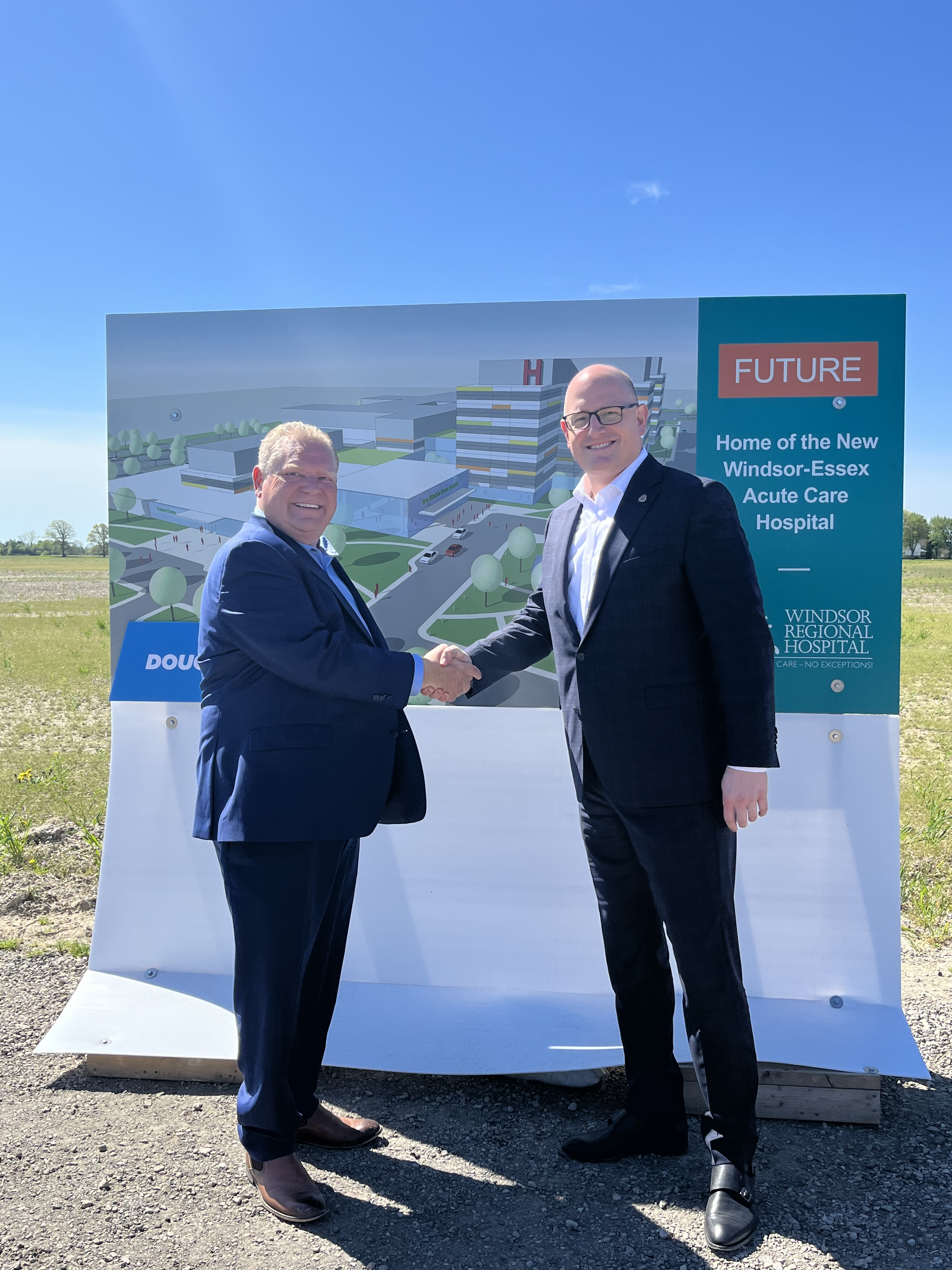
Dilkens with Doug Ford, 2022

In 2014, a grassroots group called "Citizens for an Accountable Mega-Hospital Planning Process" (CAMPP) was formed to appeal decisions to amalgamate local healthcare into a "mega-hospital", located on the outskirts of the city, a plan supported by Dilkens. CAMPP, claiming thousands of supporters, promoted community involvement in the decision-making process, and "financially, socially and environmentally responsible sound urban planning principles". CAMPP expressed concerns that the planned hospital would fail to meet the needs of the urban core populations, instead focusing on a plan for urban sprawl that centres new suburban developments. CAMPP also stressed a lack of consultation with Indigenous locals.

A long process of deliberations and public appeals by CAMPP ensued over the following years. When the Downtown Windsor BIA contributed to CAMPP's campaign, Dilkens threatened to dissolve the organization. In 2019, Dilkens was criticized for social media comments which appeared to dismiss vandalism perpetrated against one of the CAMPP supporters.

CAMPP was denied leave to appeal Ontario's Divisional Court in July 2020, and the mega hospital will be built on the corner of County Road 42 and the 9th Concession. It will be a $1.6-million square foot, 10-storey acute-care hospital. Dilkens and other proponents of building the mega hospital often cite crumbling infrastructure, lack of space, and hygiene issues in Windsor's current hospitals, as well as the need for a COVID-19 field hospital at the St. Clair Sportsplex. Dilkens commented, "I think COVID has only exposed the frailty of every system, including our health-care system locally, where you have to open a field hospital, where you have in some cases a (hospital) ward room with five patients and a bathroom down the hall. It's truly like 100-year-old health care."

=== Environment ===
In 2015, a petition garnering 12,000 signatures urged Dilkens to retract municipal approval for a commercial development near the Ojibway Prairie Complex. Local environmental advocates, including the activist group Save Ojibway, argued that the development would threaten local wildlife and damage the adjacent nature reserve.

In 2017, Dilkens rejected a related proposal to close Matchette Road, which runs between Ojibway Park and the Ojibway Prairie Provincial Nature Reserve. Citizen groups proposed that closing the road would drastically reduce wildlife deaths from traffic. The council rejected the motion, with Dilkens' support. Dilkens stated: "To move forward with closure of Matchette Road at this time would certainly have put this corporation in a great deal of jeopardy". During the council meeting, security personnel removed several citizens who voiced their objection to a presentation by developer CoCo Paving.

For the second year in a row, the City of Windsor earned an "A" from the Carbon Disclosure Project for its efforts on climate action in 2020. Windsor was among the 88 cities worldwide to receive an "A". The average score for North American cities was a "C". In 2021, Dilkens, Councillor Jo-Anne Gignac, Tree Canada, and the Canadian National Railway, announced that 60 trees will be planted in public properties across the City of Windsor to help expand the city's urban tree canopy and support the health and resilience of Windsor's environment. The City of Windsor has also doubled its tree-planting program in 2021 to 2,000 trees and since 2019, has invested $3.8 million to expand, protect, and manage the community's tree canopy.

=== Policing and public safety ===
As a city councillor, Dilkens attracted media attention and criticism by proposing "no panhandling" zones, describing panhandlers as "accosting, annoying, and interfering." Local charity and social workers criticized the move as "dehumanizing" and failing to address or understand poverty. Dilkens defended his position, claiming that panhandling makes residents and families uncomfortable and stating that it is "incumbent upon us" to create a safe and welcoming environment downtown.

Following the retirement of Al Frederick in 2019, Pam Mizuno was named as Windsor's first female police chief. The Windsor Police Services Board, which Dilkens is chair of, made the decision to appoint her.

In 2019, Dilkens and City Council approved the purchase of 20 surveillance cameras for Downtown Windsor to monitor events in real-time and to help make modifications to traffic flow as needed. In 2020, Dilkens and City Council approved the installation of 10 new red light cameras. The cameras were installed and made operational in 2021.

On February 6, 2022, a group of freedom convoy protestors arrived on Huron Church Road and created a blockade. This posed a major risk to the national economy, since the main access point to the Ambassador Bridge, which carries up to $450-million in trade with the United States every day, was choked off by the protestors. The protests were called for an end to vaccine mandates and COVID-19 restrictions. Windsor's Chief of Police, Pam Mizuno, asked the federal and provincial governments to assist in providing additional police officers and equipment to handle the situation. On February 10, Dilkens sought a court injunction to remove the protestors, which was granted on February 11, giving police additional capabilities to arrest and remove protestors. To support the ongoing police response to the blockade, Dilkens declared a state of emergency on February 14, which lasted 10 days. The response to the blockade cost the City of Windsor $5.6-million. Dilkens has been pressuring the federal and provincial governments to compensate the City of Windsor for these costs, saying that "It just shouldn't fall on the backs of the taxpayers of the City of Windsor."

On August 10, 2022, Dilkens was appointed by the Ontario government to serve as the chair of the Housing Supply Action Plan Implementation Team. The team is tasked with advising the government on ways to address homelessness and housing affordability in Ontario.

=== Arts, culture, and heritage ===
On May 26, 2018, two years after construction started, was the grand opening of Windsor's new city hall.

In 2018, Dilkens and City Council committed $5.6-million for development of the Riverfront Festival Plaza.

In 2020, Dilkens and City Council approved $7-million for the Celestial Beacon project to house Streetcar No. 351 on the riverfront. In 2022, Dilkens and City Council committed $750,000 to restoring Streetcar No. 351, which now lives at the Celestial Beacon in Assumption Park.

In 2022, Dilkens appointed Theresa Sims as the inaugural Indigenous Storyteller, and Teajai Travis as the first Multicultural Community Storyteller.

In July 2022, in honour of Hiram Walker's 206th birthday, Dilkens unveiled a bronze statue of Walker at Hiram Walker Parkette (Devonshire Road at Riverside Drive East).

== Controversies ==
=== 2018 salary ===
In 2018, Drew Dilkens received a 74.5% raise on his salary - equating to an CA$85,359 increase per year which took his salary from CA$113,201/year in 2018 to CAD$198,560/year in 2019. This raise represented the highest salary raise received by any mayor on record in Ontario. As of 2024, Dilkens is ranked as the 4th highest paid mayor in Ontario.

=== Vanity projects ===
In 2017, Windsor city council under the leadership of Drew Dilkens, approved $3 million for the purchase of Christmas lights for a new annual event known as “Bright Lights”. This received criticism for perceived willingness to allocate funds to a free public event rather than address severe flooding issues that the city was facing at the time, which the mayor eventually addressed and tabled allocating funds towards after major pushback from the public.

In 2023, the city voted in favour of a master plan for a green corridor with a vote of 6–5 with Dilkens breaking the tie. The project sees a green corridor running from town hall to the river front that would have an estimated total cost of $20 million. The first project inline with the master plan was proposed shortly after which saw the construction of a new plaza directly outside town hall which includes a new outdoor ice rink. This was intended to replace an ice rink close by that was closed down due to repair costs reaching $1 million. The new plaza, the first part of the master plan, had an initial approved budget of $4 million and has since risen to over $15 million.

=== Strong mayor powers ===
On July 1, 2023, Dilkens received strong mayor powers from the Ontario Government as part of an bill introduced by the Ford government titled “Strong mayor powers and building homes act”. This bill allows for mayors to overrule city council decisions, table budgets, and hire and dismiss city employees directly, among other things. In November 2023, the mayor used the strong mayor powers to dismiss city Engineer Chris Nepszy and city solicitor Shelby Askin Hager, this comes after Drew Dilkens previously promised to not use the strong mayor powers and remain collaborative with city council. In the same move, the mayor created a new position “Commissioner of Corporate Service” and moved the position of city solicitor under the leadership of the new Commissioner team. The Mayor then personally appointed a new people to these positions. In April 2024, the mayor used strong mayor powers to increase operating budget by $3.2 million to fund downtown improvements which also saw a 0.7% property tax increase.

In January 2025, the mayor proposed the closure of a cross-border bus service shared between the city of Windsor and the City of Detroit. The following month, the mayor used the strong mayor powers to veto the city councils vote of 7–4 to keep the bus service running. The mayor cites the trade war between Canada and the US as the driving reason behind the cancellation despite extreme push back from both city councillors and Windsor's residents.

=== Housing Accelerator Fund ===
Windsor was rejected of its application to the Canadian housing accelerator fund in 2024, a fund introduced by the federal government to address the growing housing crisis. Windsor applied to receive $70 million from the federal government to build 2,135 homes by 2026. The federal government rejected Windsor's application due to Windsor's unwillingness to make changes to zoning laws to allow multi-family units in residential zones – a requirement for eligibility to the fund.

=== Lawsuits ===
A $1.2 million lawsuit launched by former city engineer Chris Nepszy and former city solicitor Shelby Askin Hager alleges that city councillors and other city employees would receive orders to “keep the mayor happy at all costs” under threats of unknown “consequences”. Chris Nepszy was hired in September 2021 and filed for lawsuit for wrongful dismissal in 2023. Mayor Drew Dilkens, using strong mayor powers granted to him by the Ford Government, fired Nepszy citing "significant performance concerns". However, Nepszy claims this is contradictory to consistent positive performance reviews throughout his employment. Part of the allegations from Nepszy include hiding costs related to Windsor's legacy beacon street car project, requests from councillors to waive parking tickets, and politically motivated decisions about infrastructure projects. The city of Windsor and Chris Nepszy reached a settlement agreement in early 2025. The exact terms of which, including costs to tax payers, have not been made public.

In July 2024, former city planner of 16 years, Thom Hunt, filed a $2.8 million lawsuit against the City of Windsor alleging wrongful dismissal and breach of contract. Documents obtained by the superior court of Ontario describe Thom Hunt receiving an 18-month termination notice period in January 2023. Thom Hunt claims that during the 18 months, the city "deliberately marginalized and disparaged Mr. Hunt, undermined his ability to carry out his functions or maintain the professional independence necessary to serve the public."

=== 2025 budget ===
Dilkens tabled his 2025 budget for the city on January 3, 2025. The budget proposes a 100% increase in development fees for all new builds, which sparked controversy among contractors and local builders. The rise in this fee will cause a proportional increase in housing prices and substantially slow development of new business and industry. The mayor is being criticized for introducing this proposal amid a nationwide housing crisis, making housing affordability harder to attain.

Also included in Dilkens' 2025 budget is a $1.4 million cut to public transit funding. Which included the elimination of the "extras" transit service which runs bus lines to high schools around the city. The elimination of these lines saw outrage by parents, school boards, and students. Drew Dilkens and the rest of city council has since put no motion forward on offering any replacement services or alternative means of transportation. This came after the city council approved an 8-year transit master plan in 2017 that Dilkens has listed on his official mayoral website. In the past, the mayor has voted against the improvement of Windsor's transit system. As of 2025 (the final deadline for the complete implementation of the master plan) the city of Windsor has failed to implement any of the Transit Master Plan except for the elimination of the bus route “Dominion 5” and the addition of routes “Route 115” and “Route 305”.

=== Robo-calls and breaking political neutrality ===
In April 2025, roughly three weeks before the Canadian federal election, Drew Dilkens accepted an invitation extended to him personally by the Conservative Party of Canada to record "Robo-Calls" in support of the party. The calls were sent out to Windsor citizens on April 10, 2025. Dilkens recorded several messages for the calls that encouraged people to vote for the Conservative Party and encouraged people to attend the Conservative Party Rally happening later that month.

=== Hiring of friends and family ===
In April 2025 Jane Deneau, wife of Mayor Drew Dilkens, was hired into a newly created project manager role in the Parks and Recreation department of Windsor city hall. The job was posted both internally and publicly, which attracted a total of 278 candidates. According to the chief administrative officer of Windsor, all paperwork and processes were followed in the hiring process - which included the filling of a “family disclosure form”. Days after the hiring, Drew Dilkens held a press conference in which he said "She was interviewed like any other person would be interviewed and she was offered the job. I'm completely disconnected from it." The online position posting gave a salary range of $96,000 - $116,900 annually.

As of May 28 city councillor Kieran McKenzie has called for a review of the city hall's hiring practices stating that the extent to which strong mayor powers has influence over decisions must be evaluated.

Strong mayor powers give the mayor complete control to hire and fire any employee at any level employed by the city. McKenzie stated during a city hall meeting that “it’s conceivable that someone along the recruitment chain for Deneau considered Dilkens’ ability to fire people.” When asked by news outlets, the city refused to answer any questions related to Deneau’s hiring, who made the decision to reorganize the department, who’s jobs were cut, or how much money it saved the city.

Deneau’s position is a lead position in which she will be in charge of the complete management and implementation of every aspect of the design, development, and implementation of recreation and facilities project management initiatives.

Her senior, the city’s commissioner of community services, is Michael Chantler - a longtime personal friend from highschool of Mayor Drew Dilkens. According to Drew Dilkens' Facebook page, he is the godfather of one of Michael Chantler's children. Michael Chantler has been working for the city since 1999 in various roles. However, it wasn't until 2024 that he became the city's Commissioner of Community Services when a mayoral decision confirmed that he was selected for the job after having undergone "independent recruitment". The position, which oversees the parks and recreation department, pays an annual salary of $200,000.

== Electoral record ==
Dilkens (right) in 2026 with his successor, Fred Francis

The following is a list of candidates and their results. Incumbents are noted with an (X). Elected officials are in bold.

2003 Windsor municipal election results, Ward 1 councilor

Candidate	Total votes	% of total votes
**David Brister (X)**	**10,513**	**26.79**
**Joyce Zuk**	**9916**	**25.27**
Drew Dilkens	6889	17.56
Charlie Hotham	6392	16.29
Doug Cozad	3866	9.85
Mustapha Abdulhamid	1660	4.23

2006 Windsor municipal election results, Ward 1 councilor

Candidate	Total votes	% of total votes
**David Brister (X)**	**10,437**	**32.50**
**Drew Dilkens**	**8,827**	**27.49**
Gregory Baggio	4,564	14.21
Alphonso Teshuba	2,771	8.63
Tom Lynd	1,621	5.05
Mohammad Khan	1437	4.48
Henry Lau	1,268	3.94
Ed Kobrosly	1,187	3.70

2010 Windsor municipal election results, Ward 1 councilor

Candidate	Total votes	% of total votes
**Drew Dilkens**	**6312**	**73.21**
Matt Ford	1437	16.67
Joel Bentley	873	10.13

2014 Windsor municipal election results, Mayor of Windsor

Candidate	Total votes	% of total votes
**Drew Dilkens**	**32,271**	**55.36**
John Millson	15,848	27.19
Larry Horwitz	7,293	12.51
Ernie The Baconman	640	1.10
Robin Easterbrook	611	1.05
Bruce Martin	365	0.63
Steve Gavrilidis	330	0.57
Timothy Dugdale	295	0.51
Mike Tessier	244	0.42
Raymond Poisson	143	0.25
Ronald Van Dyk	132	0.23
Jaysen Sylvestre	123	0.21

2018 Windsor municipal election results, Mayor of Windsor

Candidate	Total votes	% of total votes
**Drew Dilkens (X)**	**31,201**	**59.40**
Matt Marchand	18,626	35.46
Ernie Lamont	1,121	2.13
Tom Hensel	797	1.52
Franz Dyck	785	1.49

2022 Windsor municipal election results, Mayor of Windsor

Candidate	Total votes	% of total votes
**Drew Dilkens (X)**	**26,018**	**52.51**
Chris Holt	19,177	38.70
Matthew Giancola	2,091	4.22
Benjamin Danyluk	875	1.77
Ernie Lamont	684	1.38
Aaron Day	511	1.03
Louis Vaupotic	194	0.39

2026 Windsor municipal election results, Mayor of Windsor

Candidate	Total votes	% of total votes
**Fred Francis**	**28,204**	**47.64**
Drew Dilkens	20,021	33.82
Kat Pasquatch	7,253	12.25
Tara Grayer	878	1.48
Nick Kolasky	640	1.08
Patrick Sutherland	592	1.00
Benjamin Danyluk	538	0.91
Aaron Day	420	0.71
Dylon Graves	304	0.51
Tristan Ty Morencie	182	0.31
Louis Vaupotic	169	0.29
