= Ward 2 (Windsor, Ontario) =

Ward in Windsor, Ontario, Canada

- Constituency for the Windsor City Council
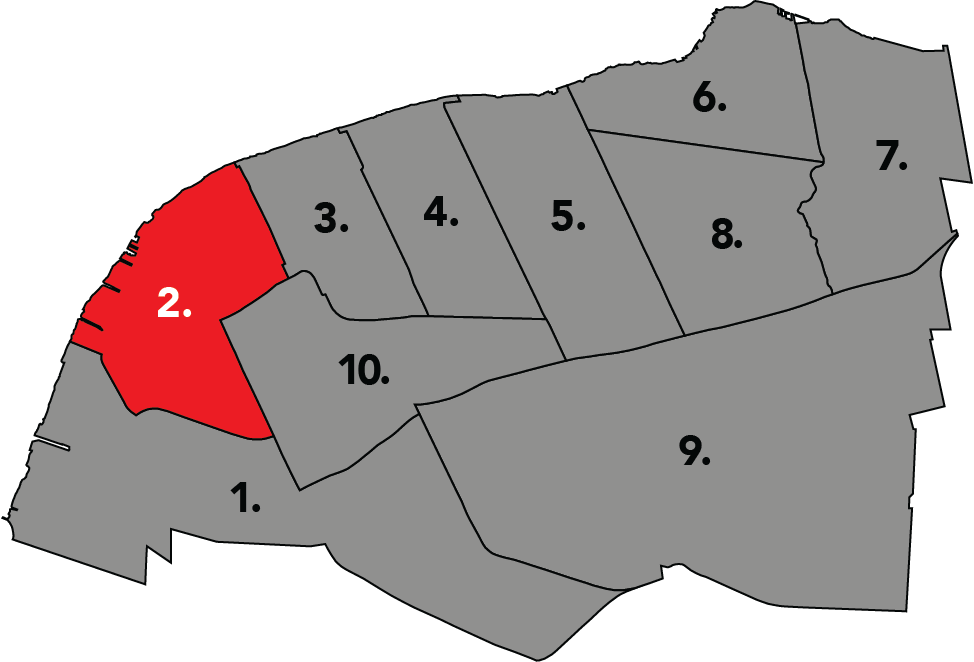
- Location of Ward 2
- City: Windsor

Current constituency
- Created: 1977
- Councillor: Frazier Fathers

Ward 2 is a municipal ward in the west end of Windsor, Ontario, Canada. It elects one member to Windsor City Council.

== Geography ==
The ward is bounded on west by Prospect Avenue, and the Ojibwe Parkway, on the south by the E. C. Row Expressway, Huron Church Road and Tecumseh Road, on the east by Michigan Central Railway Tunnel and on the north by the Detroit River. It covers the neighbourhoods of Sandwich and University (Bridgeview).

== History ==
Ward 2 was created in 1977 when Windsor City Council adopted a ward system. From 1978 to 2010, the ward was represented by two members and also contained Downtown Windsor.

=== Councillors ===
Council	Member	
1978–80	Ron Wagenberg	Roy Battagello
1980–82	Ron Wagenberg	Peggy Simpson
1982–85	Ted Bounsall	John Millson
1985–88	Ted Bounsall	John Millson
1988–91	Peter Carlesimo	Sheila Wisdom
1991–94	Peter Carlesimo	Sheila Wisdom
1994–97	Peter Carlesimo	Sheila Wisdom
1997–2000	Peter Carlesimo	Brian Masse (until 2002)
2000–03	Peter Carlesimo	Brian Masse (until 2002)
2000–03	Peter Carlesimo	Ron Jones (from 2002)
2003–06	Caroline Postma	Ron Jones (from 2002)
2006–10	Caroline Postma	Ron Jones (from 2002)
2010–14	Ron Jones	
2014–18	John Elliott	
2018–22	Fabio Constante (until 2025)	
2022–26	Fabio Constante (until 2025)	
2022–26	Frazier Fathers (from 2025)	

== Election results (2010 - present) ==
=== 2026 ===
Candidate	Popular vote		
Candidate	Votes	%	±%
Frazier Fathers (X)	TBD	TBD	TBD
Anthony Jabbour	TBD	TBD	TBD
Nick Markham	TBD	TBD	TBD
To be announced	TBD	TBD	TBD
Total valid votes	TBD	TBD	
Total rejected, unmarked and declined votes	TBD	TBD	
Turnout (from 2025 by-election)	TBD	TBD	TBD
Turnout (from 2022 election)	TBD	TBD	TBD
Eligible voters	TBD		
Note: Candidate campaign colours are based on the prominent colour used in campaign items (signs, literature, etc.) and are used as a visual differentiation between candidates. Colours from prior party affiliations may be used as well.
Sources: City of Windsor

=== 2025 by-election ===
A by-election was held on October 27, 2025, to replace Fabio Costante, who vacated the seat to become the CEO of the Windsor-Essex Community Housing Corporation.

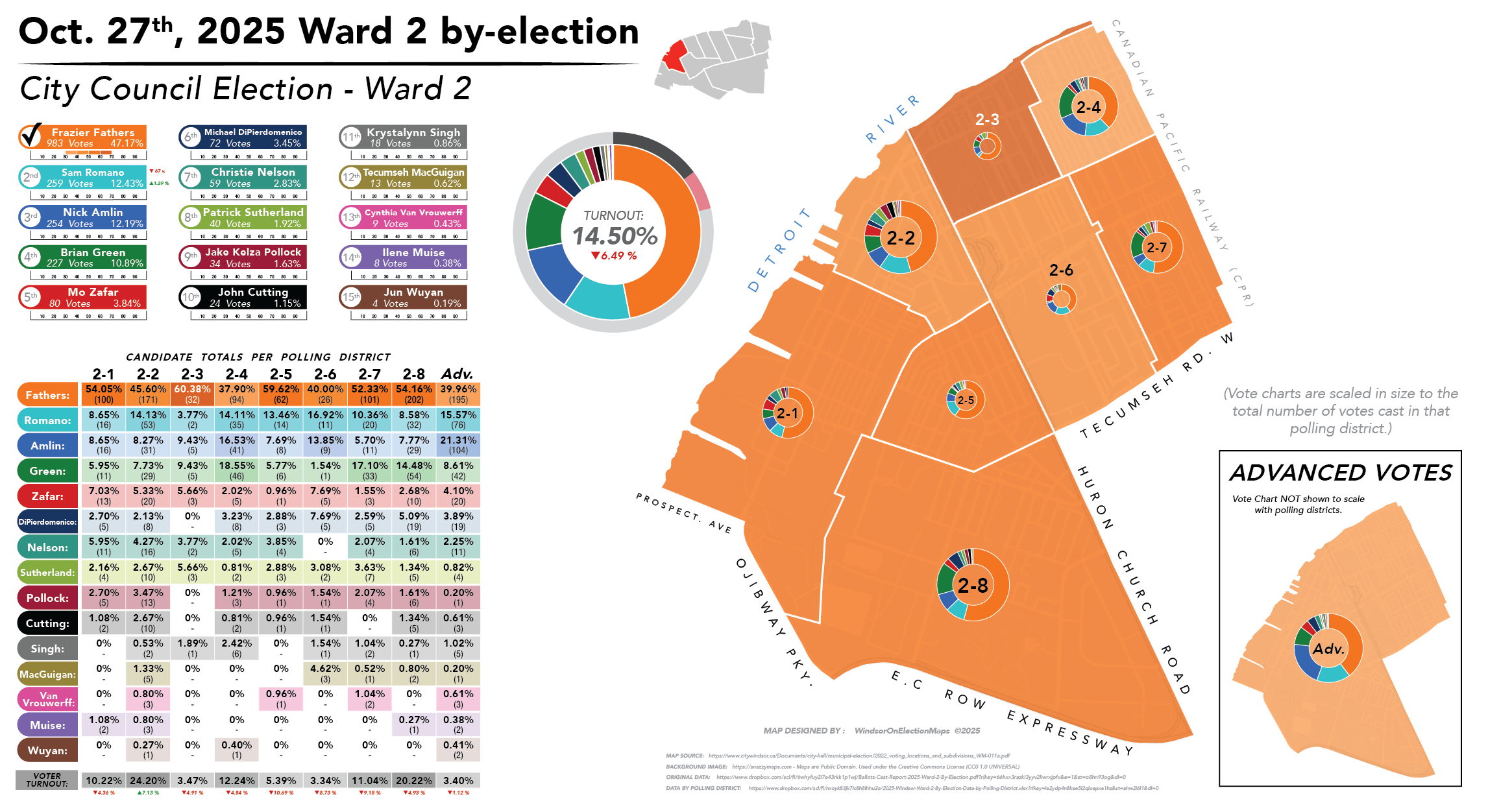
Results of the 2025 Ward 2 By-Election. Polling districts are shaded by which candidate gained the majority of the vote. Pie charts show the vote of all candidates and are scaled in size relative to the number of votes cast (except for the Advanced votes).

Candidate	Popular vote		
Candidate	Votes	%	±%
Frazier Fathers	983	47.17	--
Sam Romano	259	12.43	+1.39
Nick Amlin	254	12.19	--
Brian Green	227	10.89	--
Mo Zafar	80	3.84	--
Michael DiPierdomenico	72	3.45	--
Christine Nelson	59	2.83	--
Patrick Sutherland	40	1.92	--
Jake Kelza Pollock	34	1.63	--
John Cutting	24	1.15	--
Krystalynn Singh	18	0.86	--
Tecumseh MacGuigan	13	0.62	--
Cynthia Van Vrouwerff	9	0.43	--
Ilene Muise	8	0.38	--
Jun Wuyan	4	0.19	--
Total valid votes	2,084	99.81	
Total rejected, unmarked and declined votes	4	0.19	
Turnout	2,087	14.50	-6.49
Eligible voters	14,391*		
Note: Candidate campaign colours are based on the prominent colour used in campaign items (signs, literature, etc.) and are used as a visual differentiation between candidates. Colours from prior party affiliations may be used as well. *Based on 2022 municipal election eligible voter totals.

Candidates

- Nick Amlin, international relations and sociology student at the University of Windsor, retired from the Royal Canadian Air Force
- John Cutting, tile setter, businessperson, CEO of the Huron-Wyandot Council of Ontario
- Michael DiPierdomenico, letter carrier for Canada Post
- Frazier Fathers, independent, non-profit and affordable housing consultant, formerly with the United Way
- Brian Green, salesperson
- Jake Kelza Pollock, salesperson, social media marketing
- Tecumseh MacGuigan, bank teller, formerly a CNC machinist, and custodian
- Ilene Muise, social sector worker
- Christie Nelson, project manager with a non-profit, Greater Essex County District School Board school trustee, former auxiliary police officer and news reporter
- Sam Romano, retired banker for RBC, ran in this ward in 2022
- Krystalynn Singh, businessperson and property manager
- Patrick Sutherland, appliance repair and salesperson, computer consultant, web designer, former disc jockey
- Cynthia Ann Van Vrouwerff, former janitorial and house and hospitality industry worker
- Jun Wuyan, production technician
- Mo Zafar, lawyer, former member of the Canadian Armed Forces.

=== 2022 ===
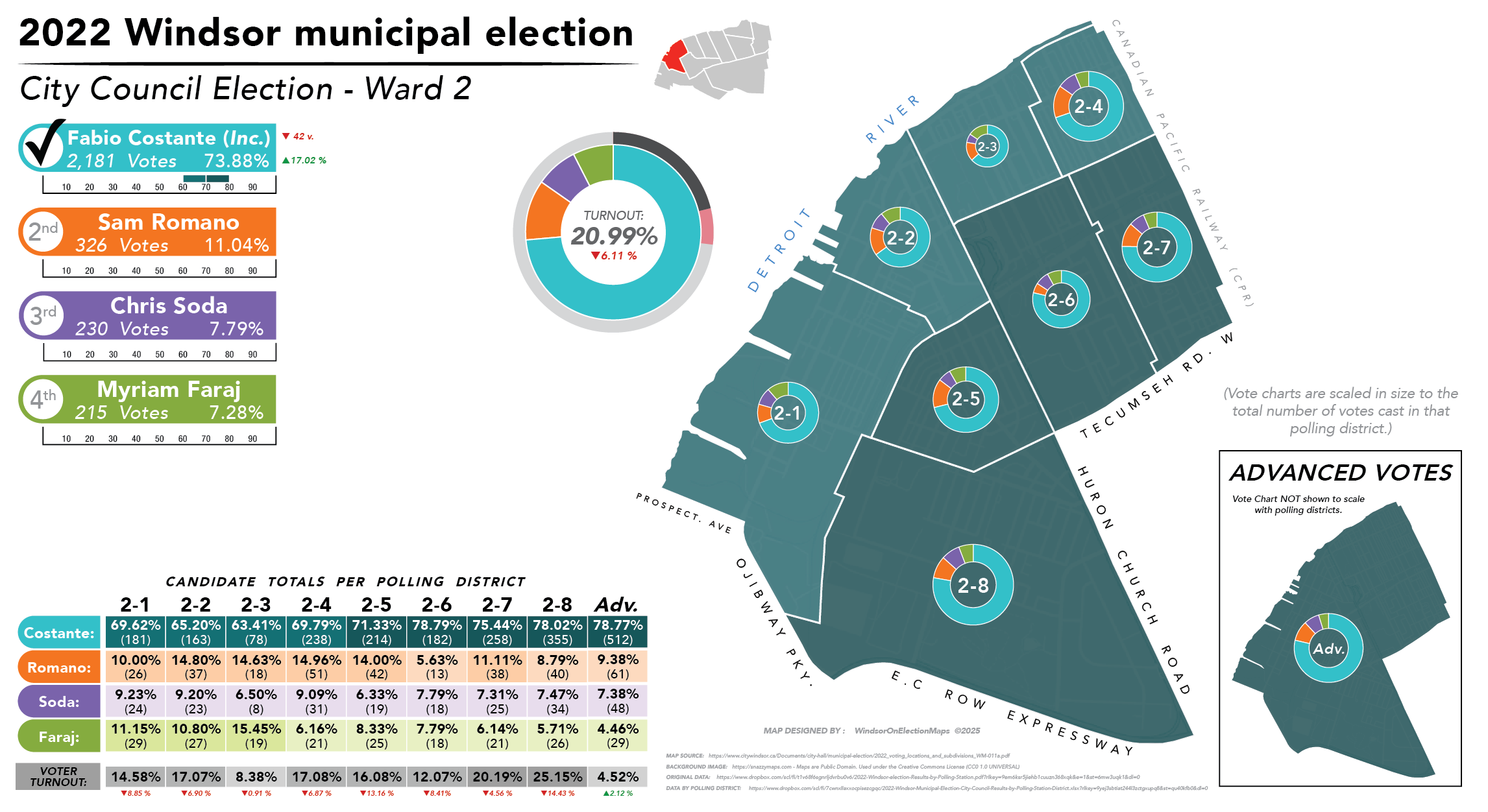
Results of the election in 2022. Polling districts are shaded by which candidate gained the majority of the vote.

Candidate	Popular vote		
Candidate	Votes	%	±%
Fabio Costante (X)	2,181	73.88	+17.02
Sam Romano	326	11.04	--
Chris Soda	230	7.79	--
Myriam Faraj	215	7.28	--
Total valid votes	2,952	97.67	
Total rejected, unmarked and declined votes	69	2.33	
Turnout	3,021	20.99	-6.11
Eligible voters	14,391		
Note: Candidate campaign colours are based on the prominent colour used in campaign items (signs, literature, etc.) and are used as a visual differentiation between candidates. Colours from prior party affiliations may be used as well.
Sources: City of Windsor

=== 2018 ===
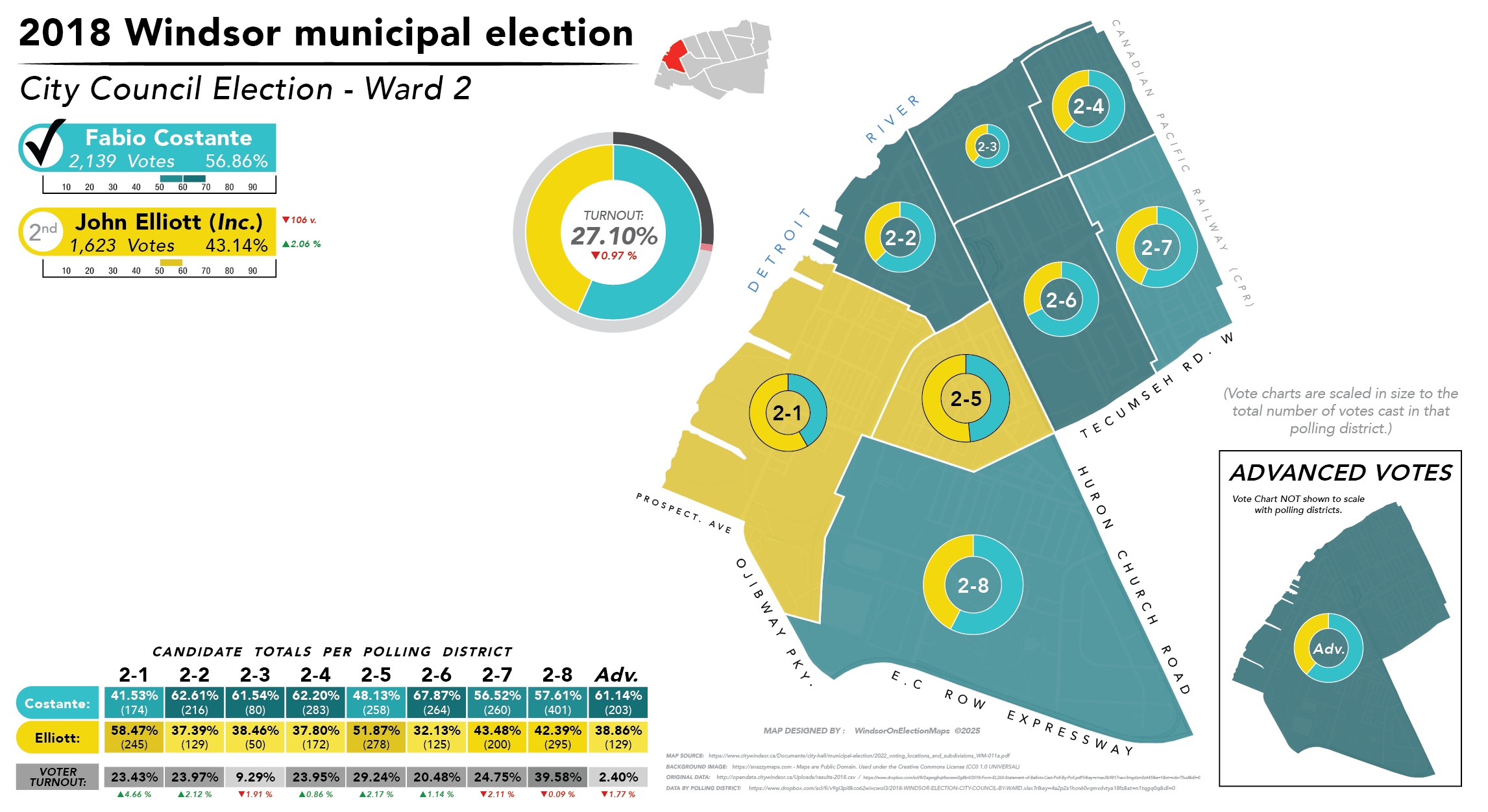
Results of the election in 2018. Polling districts are shaded by which candidate gained the majority of the vote.

Candidate	Popular vote		
Candidate	Votes	%	±%
Fabio Costante	2,139	56.86	--
John Elliott (X)	1,623	43.14	+2.06
Total valid votes	3,762	98.62	
Total rejected, unmarked and declined votes	53	1.38	
Turnout	3,815	27.10	-0.97
Eligible voters	14,078		
Note: Candidate campaign colours are based on the prominent colour used in campaign items (signs, literature, etc.) and are used as a visual differentiation between candidates. Colours from prior party affiliations may be used as well.

=== 2014 ===
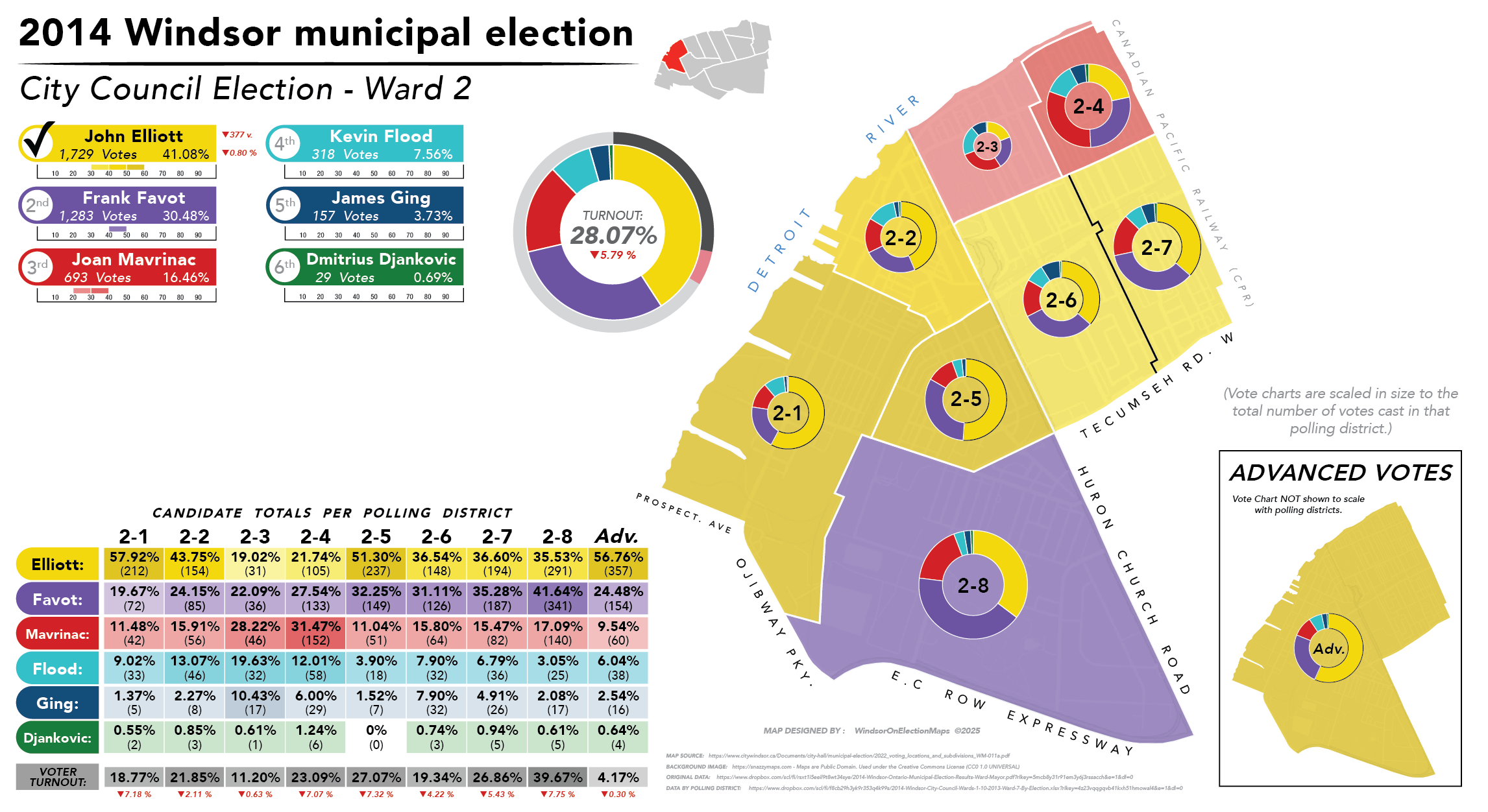
Results of the election in 2014. Polling districts are shaded by which candidate gained the majority of the vote.

Incumbent Councillor Ron Jones announced he would not run for re-election.

Candidate	Popular vote		
Candidate	Votes	%	±%
John Elliott	1,729	41.08	-0.80
Frank Favot	1,283	30.48	--
Joan Mavrinac	693	16.46	--
Kevin Flood	318	7.56	--
James Ging	157	3.73	--
Dmitrius Djankovic	29	0.69	--
Total valid votes	4,209	98.58	
Total rejected, unmarked and declined votes	61	1.42	
Turnout	4,270	28.07	-5.79
Eligible voters	15,210		
Note: Candidate campaign colours are based on the prominent colour used in campaign items (signs, literature, etc.) and are used as a visual differentiation between candidates. Colours from prior party affiliations may be used as well.

=== 2010 ===
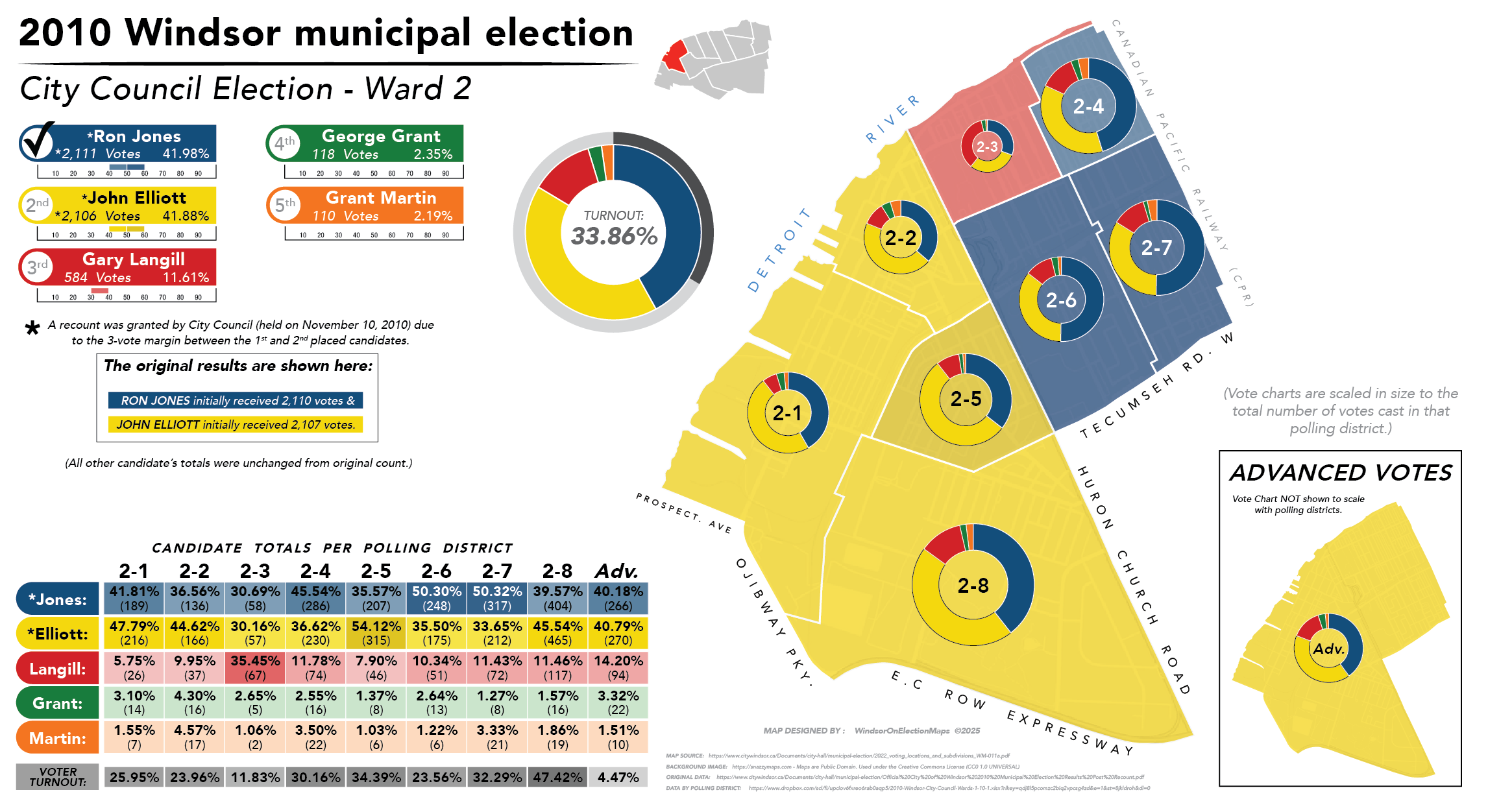
Results of the election in Ward 2. Polling districts are shaded by which candidate gained the majority of the vote.

After the election, runner-up candidate John Elliott requested a recount from City Council due to the 3-vote margin of victor between him and the winner Ron Jones. It was granted, and held on November 10, where it found that Ron Jones had received 2,111 votes and John Elliott had received 2,106 votes (all other candidates vote totals remained unchanged from the initial count.)

Candidate	Popular vote	
Candidate	Votes	%
Ron Jones	2,111	41.98
John Elliott	2,106	41.88
Gary Langril	584	11.61
George Grant	118	2.35
Grant Martin	110	2.19
Total valid votes	5,029	98.00
Total rejected, unmarked and declined votes	103	2.00
Turnout	5,132	33.86
Eligible voters	15,155	
Note: Candidate campaign colours are based on the prominent colour used in campaign items (signs, literature, etc.) and are used as a visual differentiation between candidates. Colours from prior party affiliations may be used as well.

Original results before the recount are shown here:

Candidate	Vote	%
Ron Jones	2,110*	41.98
John Elliott	2,107*	41.88
Gary Langril	584	11.61
George Grant	118	2.35
Grant Martin	110	2.19

== Election results (1977-2010) ==
=== 2006 ===
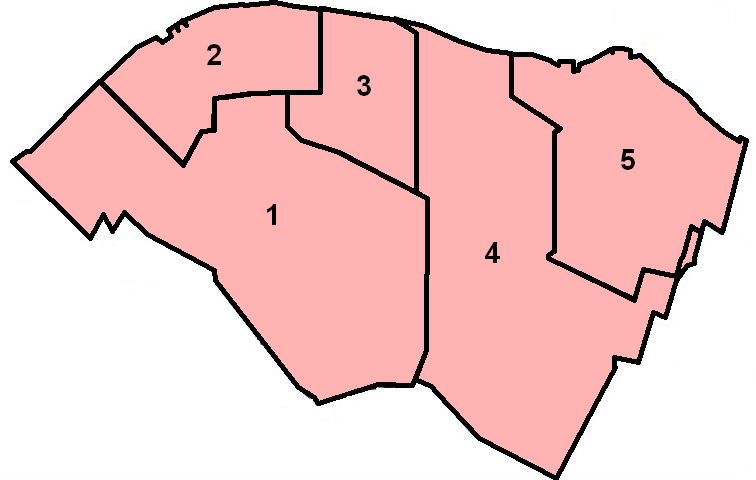
Map of Windsor's 5 wards used prior to 2010. Ward 2 is on the top left.

Council Candidate (elect 2)	Vote	%
Ron Jones	4,497	37.41
Caroline Postma	2,728	22.69
Gail Growe	1,854	15.42
Dan Petoran	1,697	14.12
Chris Schnurr	434	3.61
Chris Richie	424	3.53
Tom Livingston	388	3.23

=== 2003 ===
Council Candidate	Vote	%
Ron Jones	5,068	31.88
Caroline Postma	3,455	21.73
Peter Carlesimo	3,137	19.73
Dennis Chronopoulos	1,627	10.23
Robert Petroni	1,237	7.78
Lawrence Holland	1,014	6.38
Leo Petrilli	359	2.26

=== 2002 by-election ===
A by-election was held September 9, 2002 to replace Brian Masse who had been elected to the Canadian House of Commons in a federal by-election held in Windsor West in May 2002.

Council Candidate	Vote	%
Ron Jones	1,980	41.96
Caroline Postma	1,202	25.47
Joe McParland	804	17.04
Brian Kersey	295	6.25
Russell Heath	224	4.75
Robert Potomski	144	3.05
Bill Wiseman	43	0.91
Elsie Shmyr Swanson	27	0.57

=== 2000 ===
2000 Windsor municipal election
Candidate	Votes	%
(x)Brian Masse	4,908	32.36
(x)Peter Carlesimo	3,430	22.61
Jim Bennett	2,861	18.86
Graham Wilson	1,274	8.40
Lawrence Holland	1,144	7.54
Frank DiPierdomenico	714	4.71
Kevin Flood	373	2.46
Bob Harper	336	2.22
Bowen Alkemade	128	0.84
Total votes	15,168	100.00

=== 1997 ===
1997 Windsor municipal election
Candidate	Votes	%
Brian Masse	3,425	26.20
(x) Peter Carlesimo	2,865	21.91
Jim Bennett	2,491	19.05
Rolly Marentette	1,613	12.34
George Dadamo	1,587	12.14
Gail Zdyb	597	4.57
Robert Potomski	496	3.79
Total votes	13,074	100.00

=== 1994 ===
Council Candidate	Vote	%
Sheila Wisdom	4,585	37.96
Peter Carlesimo	3,349	27.73
Glenn Matthews	2,633	21.80
Kevin Cathcart	1,511	12.51

=== 1991 ===
1991 Windsor municipal election
Candidate	Votes	%
(x)Sheila Wisdom	6,379	39.74
(x)Peter Carlesimo	4,852	30.23
Arlene Rousseau	2,300	14.33
Paul Dale	831	5.18
George J. Mahler	629	3.92
Gilles Brunet	554	3.45
Kevin Cathcart	506	3.15
Total Valid Votes	16,051	100.00

=== 1988 ===
Council Candidate	Vote	%
Peter Carlesimo	5,645	29.04
Sheila Wisdom	5,149	26.49
Mike Walsh	4,988	25.66
Robert Joseph Potomski	1,081	5.56
Greg Nassr	940	4.84
Jim Meunier	611	3.14
David Brownell	517	2.66
Larry St. Denis	507	2.61

=== 1985 ===
Council Candidate	Vote	%
John Millson	5,920	37.00
Ted Bounsall	3,156	19.73
Peter Carlesimo	3,139	19.62
Ted Broad	1,146	7.16
David Tucker	1,117	6.98
Dan Murphy	563	3.52
Robert A. Andrusevich	361	2.26
Michael J. Collins	311	1.94
Cully Robinson	285	1.78

=== 1982 ===
Council Candidate	Vote	%
Ted Bounsall	5,737	28.26
John Millson	4,482	22.08
John Fitzgerald	2,198	10.83
Peggy Simpson	2,159	10.64
Lyle Browning	1,760	8.67
George Dubauskas	1,706	8.40
Doglas (Skippy) Kenney	1,069	5.27
Larry St. Denis	702	3.46
Bob Potomski	487	2.40

=== 1980 ===
Council Candidate	Vote	%
Ron Wagenberg	3,558	25.53
Peggy Simpson	2,757	19.78
George Dubauskas	2,562	18.38
Roy A. Battagello	2,139	15.35
Larry Horwitz	1,876	13.46
Gerald B. Pageau	595	4.27
Steven Farron	452	3.24

=== 1978 ===
Council Candidate	Vote	%
Ron Wagenberg	4,505	31.25
Roy Battagello	3,896	27.02
J. Lyle Browning	2,544	17.65
Robert Moore	1,623	11.26
George J. Dubauskas	1,044	7.24
Derek Insley	805	5.58
