= 2014 Windsor municipal election =

- October 27, 2014
- Turnout: 37.46% (▼8.82 pp)
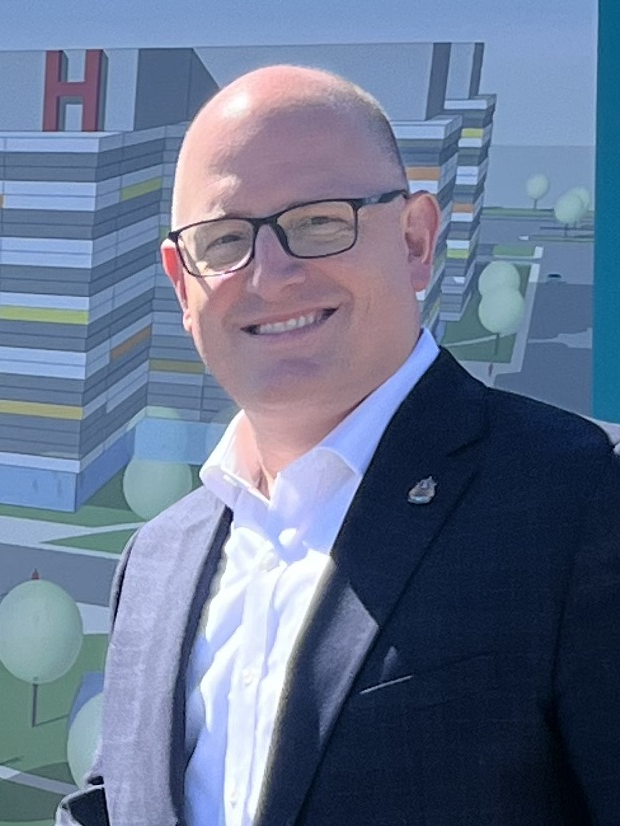
| Candidate | Drew Dilkens | John Millson | Larry Horwitz |
| Popular vote | 32,271 | 15,848 | 7,293 |
| Percentage | 55.36% | 27.19% | 12.51% |
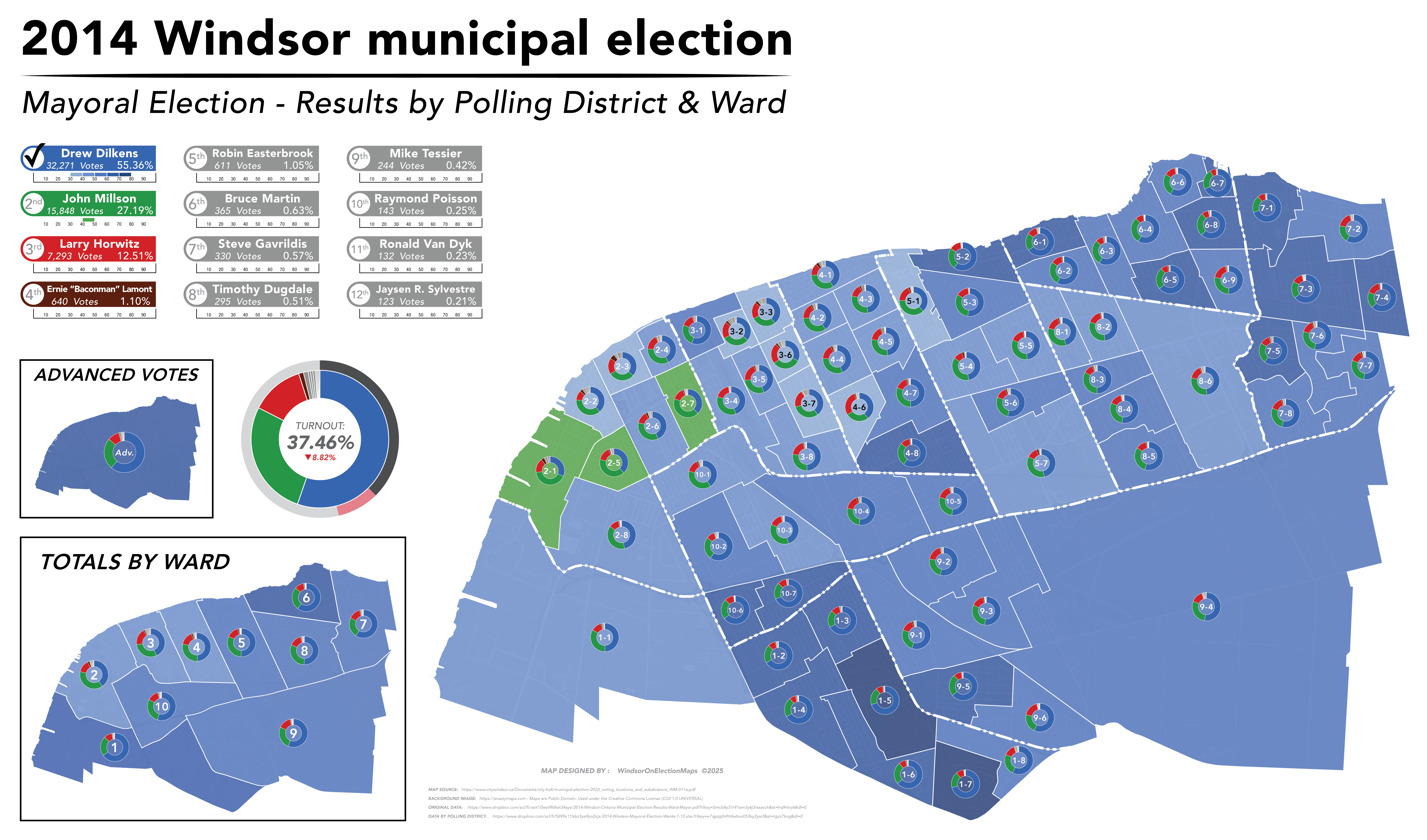
- Map showing the winning candidate's vote strength in each of the 10 wards and their respective polling districts. The districts shaded in Blue voted a majority for Drew Dilkens, and Green voted a majority for John Millson. Pie Charts indicate the total vote of all candidates per Ward/polling district.
Mayor before election
Eddie Francis
Elected mayor
Drew Dilkens

The 2014 Windsor municipal election occurred on October 27, 2014, to elect the Mayor of Windsor, Windsor City Council and the Greater Essex County District School Board, Windsor Essex Catholic District School Board, Conseil scolaire catholique Providence and Conseil scolaire Viamonde.

The election was held on the same day as elections in every other municipality in Ontario, as well as the elections in neighbouring towns in Essex County.

== Mayor ==
Incumbent three-term Mayor Eddie Francis announced in early 2014 that he would not be standing for re-election.

| Candidate | Popular vote | | |
| Candidate | Votes | % | ±% |
|---|---|---|---|
| Drew Dilkens | 32,271 | 55.36 | -- |
| John Millson | 15,848 | 27.19 | -- |
| Larry Horwitz | 7,293 | 12.51 | -- |
| Ernie "The Baconman" Lamont | 640 | 1.10 | -- |
| Robin Easterbrook | 611 | 105 | -- |
| Bruce Martin | 365 | 0.63 | -- |
| Steve Gavrildis | 330 | 0.57 | -- |
| Timothy Dugdale | 295 | 0.51 | -- |
| Mike Tessier | 244 | 0.42 | -- |
| Raymond Poisson | 143 | 0.25 | -- |
| Ronald Van Dyk | 132 | 0.23 | -- |
| Jaysen R. Sylvestre | 123 | 0.21 | -- |
| Total valid votes | 58,295 | 99.20 | |
| Total rejected, unmarked and declined votes | 475 | 0.80 | |
| Turnout | 58,770 | 37.46 | -8.82 |
| Eligible voters | 156,870 | | |
Note: Candidate campaign colours are based on the prominent colour used in campaign items (signs, literature, etc.) and are used as a visual differentiation between candidates. Colours from prior party affiliations may be used as well.

== City Council ==
=== Ward 1 ===
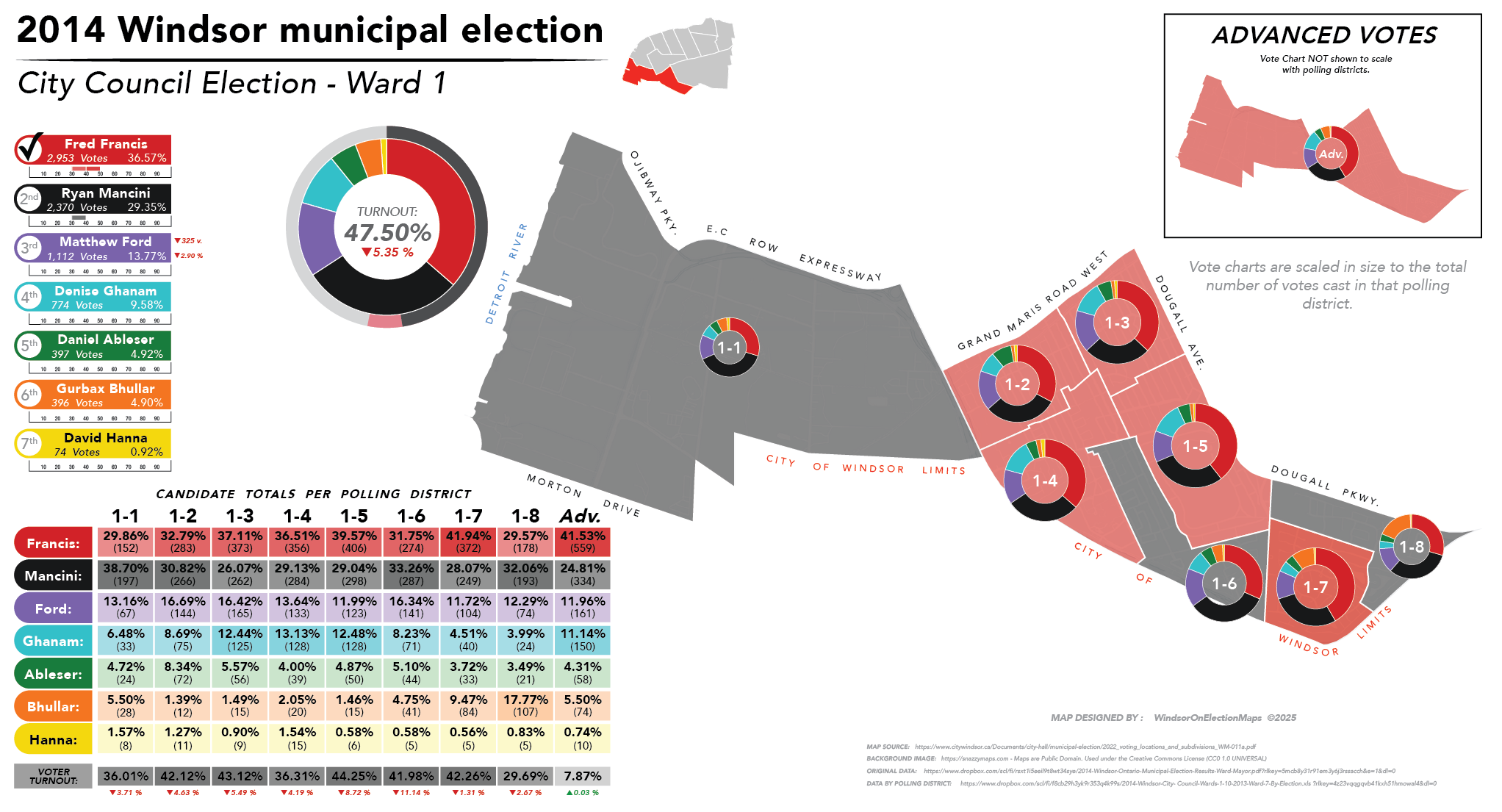
Results of the election in Ward 1. Polling districts are shaded by which candidate gained the majority of the vote.

Incumbent Councillor Drew Dilkens stepped down in order to run for Mayor.

| Candidate | Popular vote | | |
| Candidate | Votes | % | ±% |
|---|---|---|---|
| Fred Francis | 2,953 | 36.57 | -- |
| Ryan Mancini | 2,370 | 29.35 | -- |
| Matt Ford | 1,112 | 13.77 | -2.90 |
| Denise Claire Ghanam | 774 | 9.58 | -- |
| Daniel Ableser | 397 | 4.92 | -- |
| Gurbax Bhullar | 3.96 | 4.90 | -- |
| David Hanna | 74 | 0.92 | -- |
| Total valid votes | 8,076 | 99.85 | |
| Total rejected, unmarked and declined votes | 94 | 1.15 | |
| Turnout | 8,170 | 47.50 | -5.35 |
| Eligible voters | 17,201 | | |
Note: Candidate campaign colours are based on the prominent colour used in campaign items (signs, literature, etc.) and are used as a visual differentiation between candidates. Colours from prior party affiliations may be used as well.

=== Ward 2 ===
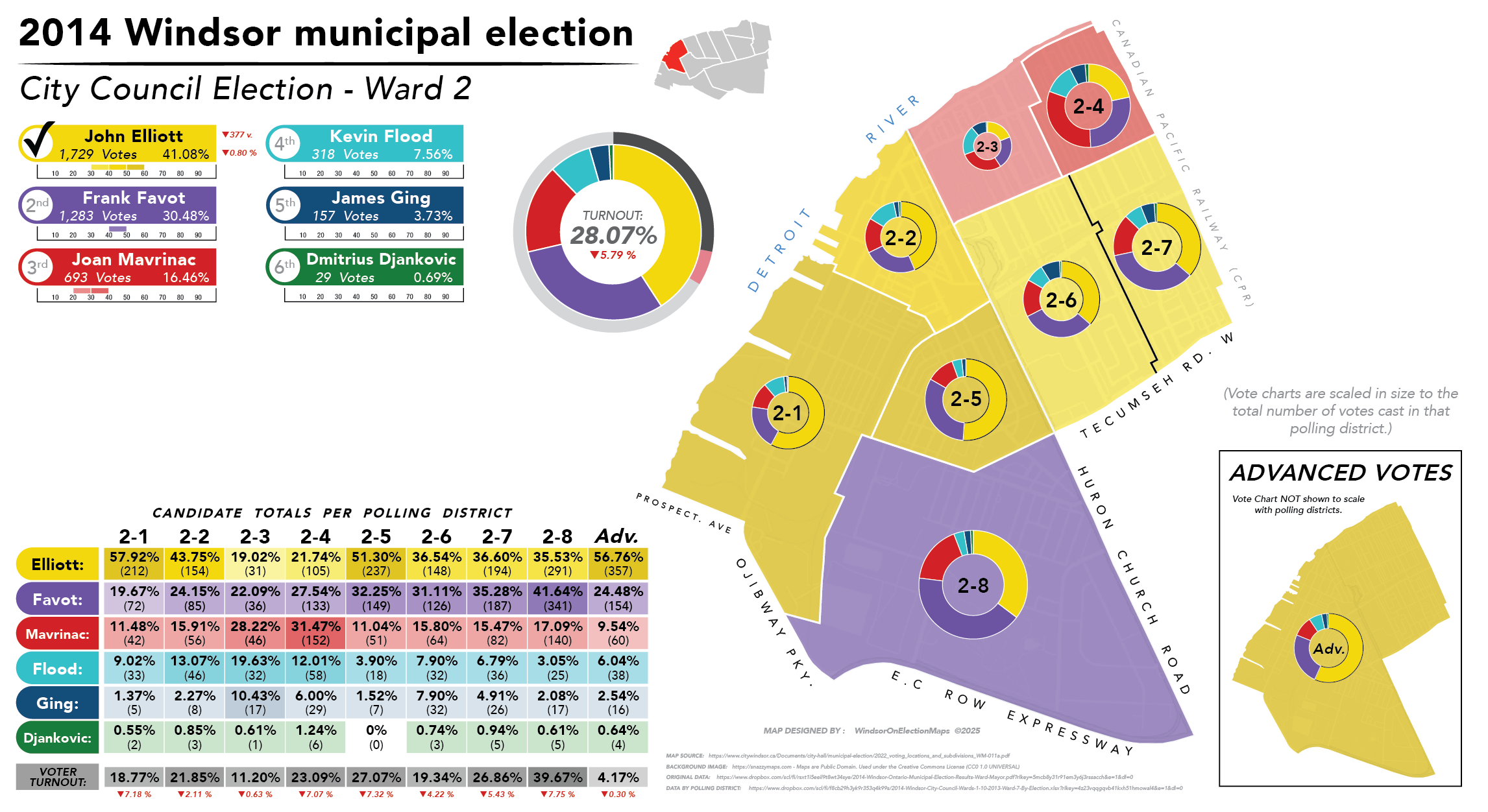
Results of the election in Ward 2. Polling districts are shaded by which candidate gained the majority of the vote.

Incumbent Councillor Ron Jones announced he would not run for re-election.

| Candidate | Popular vote | | |
| Candidate | Votes | % | ±% |
|---|---|---|---|
| John Elliott | 1,729 | 41.08 | -0.80 |
| Frank Favot | 1,283 | 30.48 | -- |
| Joan Mavrinac | 693 | 16.46 | -- |
| Kevin Flood | 318 | 7.56 | -- |
| James Ging | 157 | 3.73 | -- |
| Dmitrius Djankovic | 29 | 0.69 | -- |
| Total valid votes | 4,209 | 98.58 | |
| Total rejected, unmarked and declined votes | 61 | 1.42 | |
| Turnout | 4,270 | 28.07 | -5.79 |
| Eligible voters | 15,210 | | |
Note: Candidate campaign colours are based on the prominent colour used in campaign items (signs, literature, etc.) and are used as a visual differentiation between candidates. Colours from prior party affiliations may be used as well.

=== Ward 3 ===
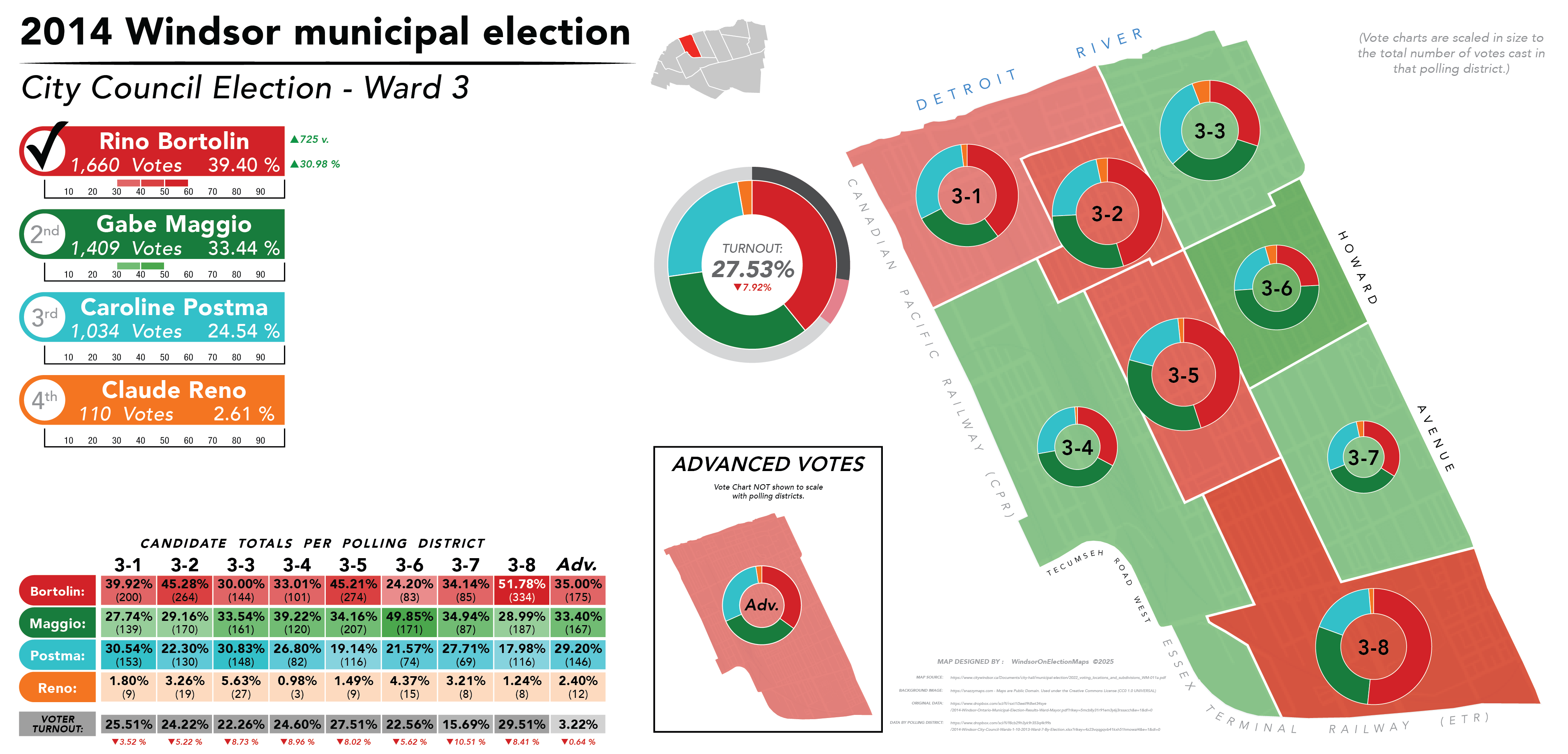
Results of the election in Ward 3. Polling districts are shaded by which candidate gained the majority of the vote.

Incumbent Councillor Fulvio Valentinis announced he would not run for re-election.

| Candidate | Popular vote | | |
| Candidate | Votes | % | ±% |
|---|---|---|---|
| Rino Bortolin | 1,660 | 39.40 | +30.98 |
| Gabe Maggio | 1,409 | 33.44 | -- |
| Caroline Postma | 1,034 | 24.54 | -- |
| Claude Reno | 110 | 2.61 | -- |
| Total valid votes | 4,213 | 97.15 | |
| Total rejected, unmarked and declined votes | 124 | 2.85 | |
| Turnout | 4,337 | 27.53 | -7.92 |
| Eligible voters | 15,756 | | |
Note: Candidate campaign colours are based on the prominent colour used in campaign items (signs, literature, etc.) and are used as a visual differentiation between candidates. Colours from prior party affiliations may be used as well.

=== Ward 4 ===
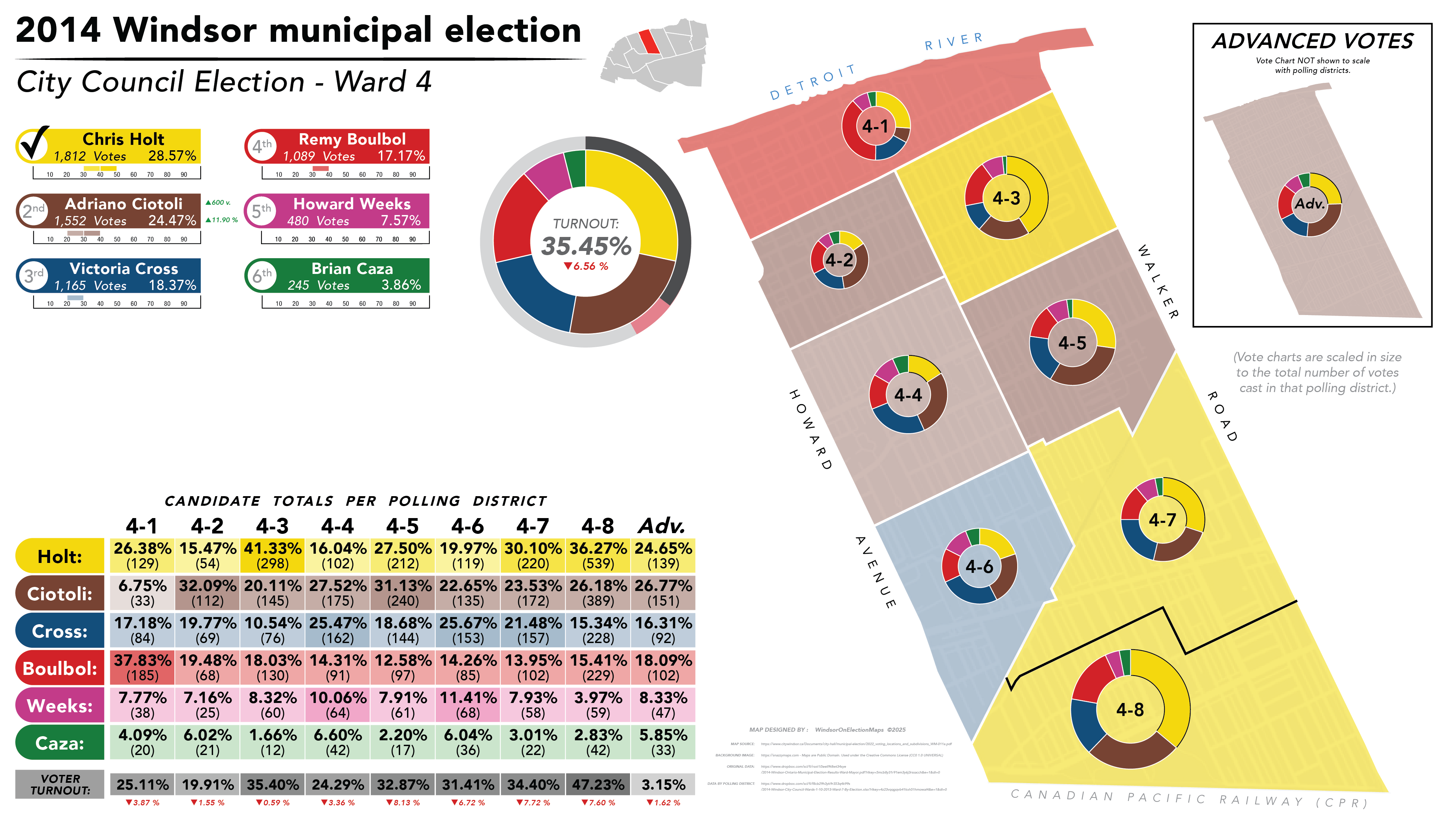
Results of the election in Ward 4. Polling districts are shaded by which candidate gained the majority of the vote.

Incumbent Councillor Alan Halberstadt stepped down in order to run for English Public School Board Trustee for Wards 3, 4, 10.

| Candidate | Popular vote | | |
| Candidate | Votes | % | ±% |
|---|---|---|---|
| Chris Holt | 1,812 | 28.57 | -- |
| Adriano Ciotoli | 1,552 | 24.47 | +11.90 |
| Victoria Cross | 1,165 | 18.37 | -- |
| Remy Boulbol | 1,089 | 17.17 | -- |
| Howard Weeks | 480 | 7.57 | -- |
| Brian Caza | 245 | 3.86 | -- |
| Total valid votes | 6,343 | 98.18 | |
| Total rejected, unmarked and declined votes | 118 | 1.82 | |
| Turnout | 6,461 | 35.45 | -6.56 |
| Eligible voters | 18,225 | | |
Note: Candidate campaign colours are based on the prominent colour used in campaign items (signs, literature, etc.) and are used as a visual differentiation between candidates. Colours from prior party affiliations may be used as well.

=== Ward 5 ===
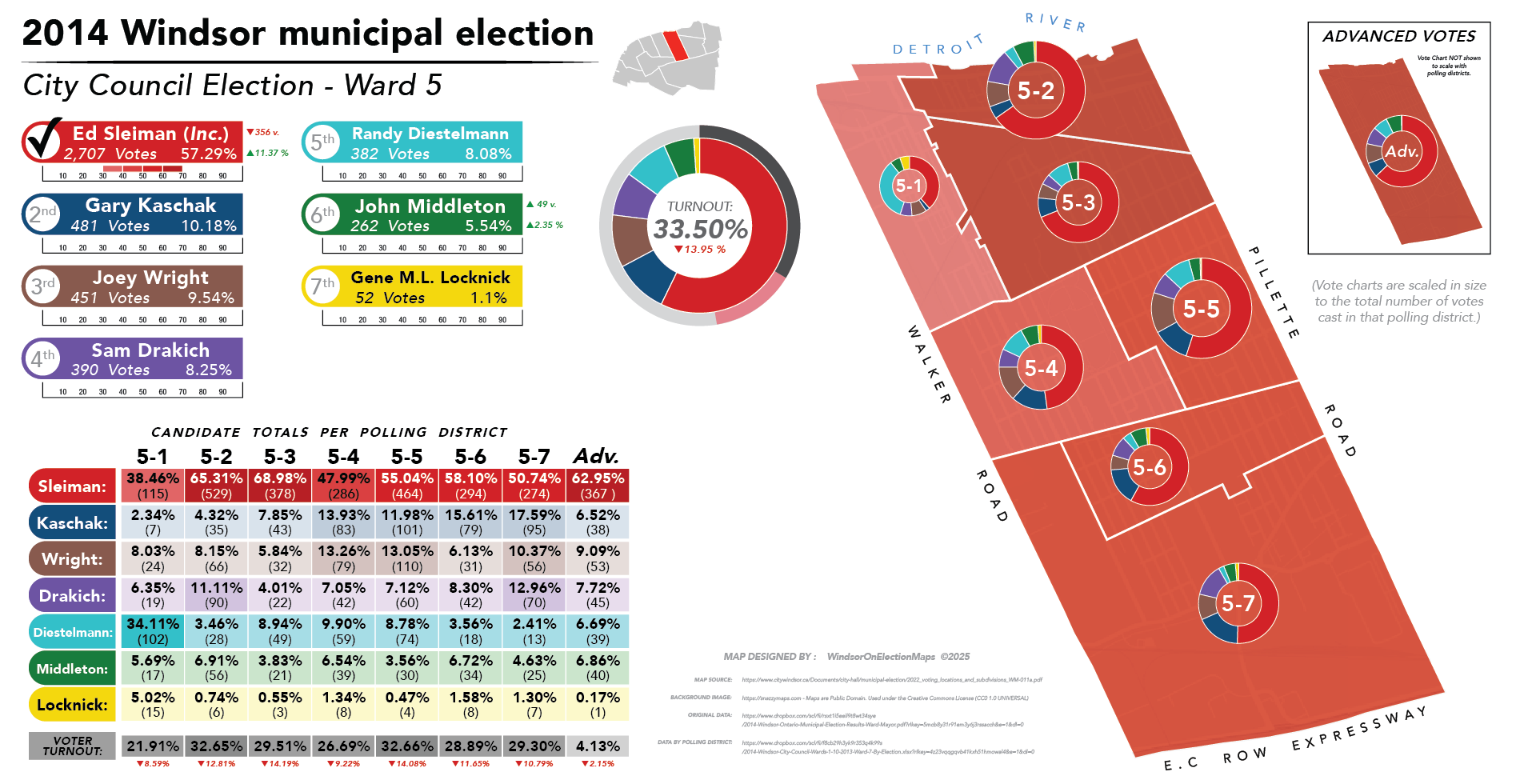
Results of the election in Ward 5. Polling districts are shaded by which candidate gained the majority of the vote.

| Candidate | Popular vote | | |
| Candidate | Votes | % | ±% |
|---|---|---|---|
| Ed Sleiman (X) | 2,707 | 57.29 | +11.37 |
| Gary Kaschak | 481 | 10.18 | -- |
| Joey Wright | 451 | 9.54 | -- |
| Sam Drakich | 390 | 8.25 | -- |
| Randy Diestelmann | 382 | 8.08 | -- |
| John Middleton | 262 | 5.54 | +2.35 |
| Gene M.L Locknick | 52 | 1.10 | -- |
| Total valid votes | 4,725 | 98.42 | |
| Total rejected, unmarked and declined votes | 76 | 1.58 | |
| Turnout | 4,801 | 33.50 | -13.95 |
| Eligible voters | 14,333 | | |
Note: Candidate campaign colours are based on the prominent colour used in campaign items (signs, literature, etc.) and are used as a visual differentiation between candidates. Colours from prior party affiliations may be used as well.

=== Ward 6 ===
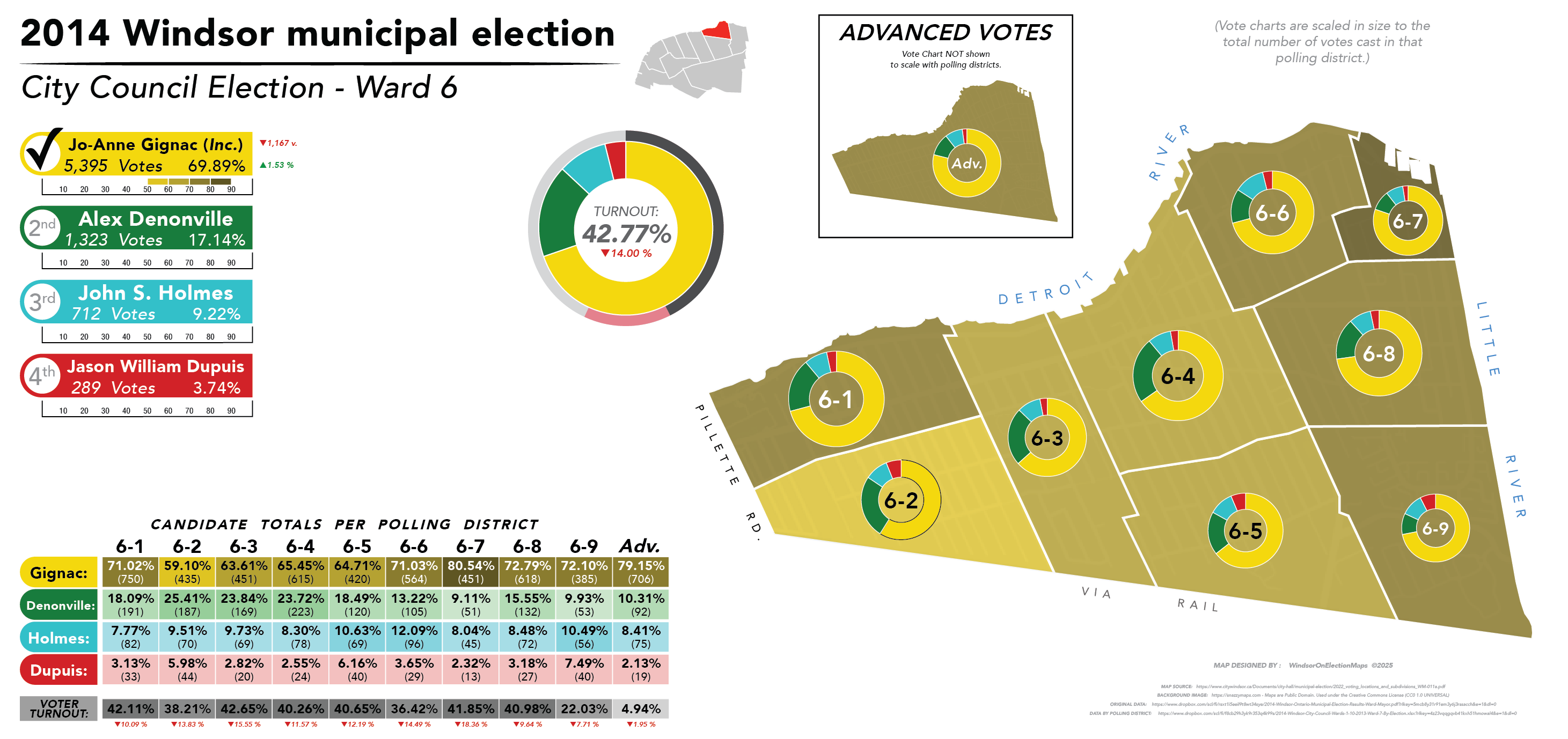
Results of the election in Ward 6. Polling districts are shaded by which candidate gained the majority of the vote.

| Candidate | Popular vote | | |
| Candidate | Votes | % | ±% |
|---|---|---|---|
| Jo-Anne Gignac (X) | 5,395 | 69.89 | +1.53 |
| Alex Denonville | 1,323 | 17.14 | -- |
| John S. Holmes | 712 | 9.22 | -- |
| Jason William Dupuis | 289 | 3.74 | -- |
| Total valid votes | 7,719 | 98.75 | |
| Total rejected, unmarked and declined votes | 98 | 1.25 | |
| Turnout | 7,817 | 42.77 | -14.0 |
| Eligible voters | 18,277 | | |
Note: Candidate campaign colours are based on the prominent colour used in campaign items (signs, literature, etc.) and are used as a visual differentiation between candidates. Colours from prior party affiliations may be used as well.

=== Ward 7 ===
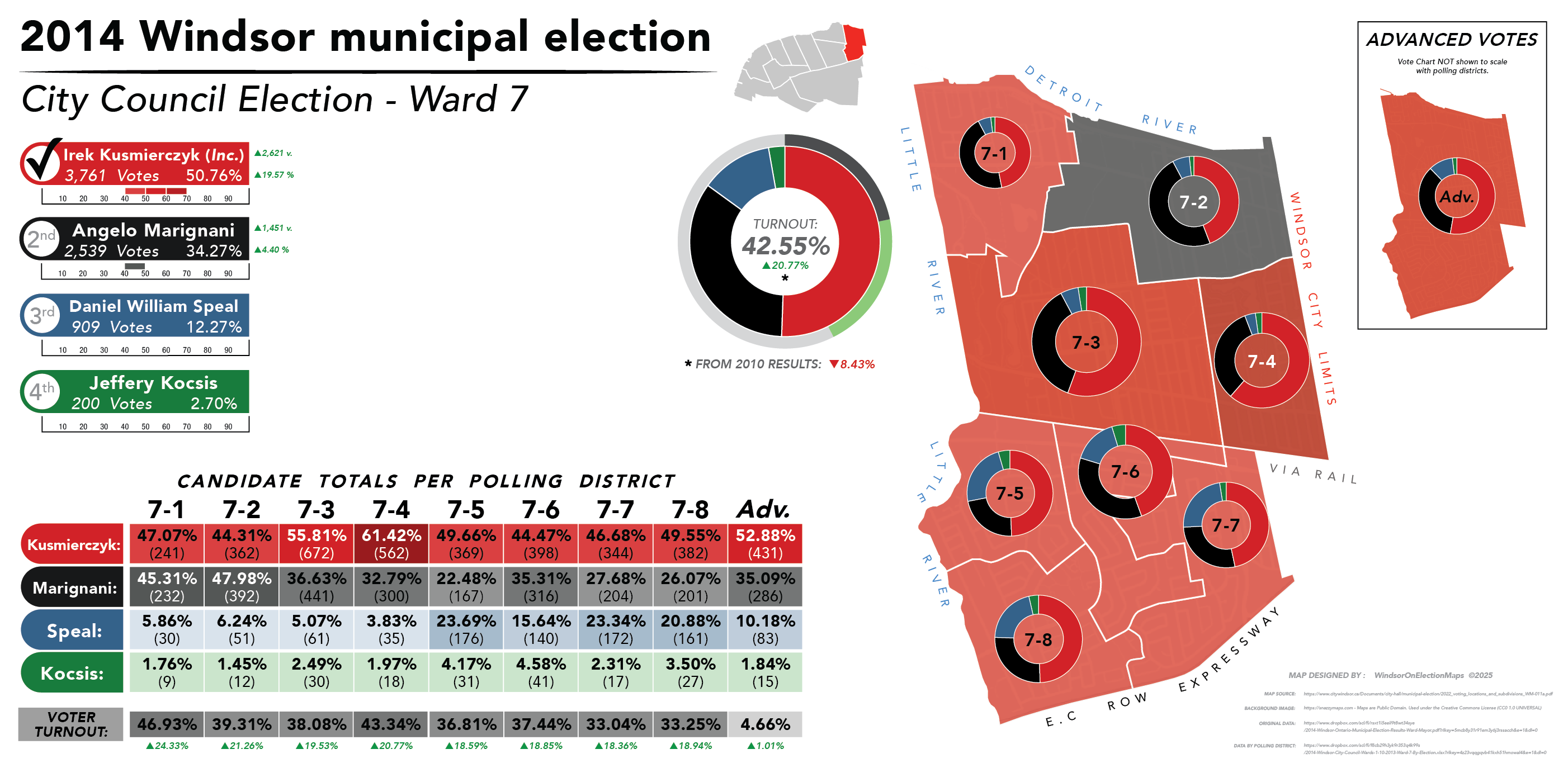
Results of the election in Ward 7. Polling districts are shaded by which candidate gained the majority of the vote.

| Candidate | Popular vote | | |
| Candidate | Votes | % | ±% |
|---|---|---|---|
| Irek Kusmierczyk (X) | 3,761 | 50.76 | +19.57 |
| Angelo Marignani | 2,539 | 34.27 | +4.40 |
| Daniel William Spear | 909 | 12.27 | -- |
| Jeffery Kocsis | 200 | 2.70 | -- |
| Total valid votes | 7,409 | 98.77 | |
| Total rejected, unmarked and declined votes | 93 | 1.23 | |
| Turnout (from 2013 by-election) | 7,502 | 42.55 | +20.77 |
| Turnout (from 2010 election) | 7,502 | 42.55 | -8.43 |
| Eligible voters | 17,629 | | |
Note: Candidate campaign colours are based on the prominent colour used in campaign items (signs, literature, etc.) and are used as a visual differentiation between candidates. Colours from prior party affiliations may be used as well.

=== Ward 8 ===
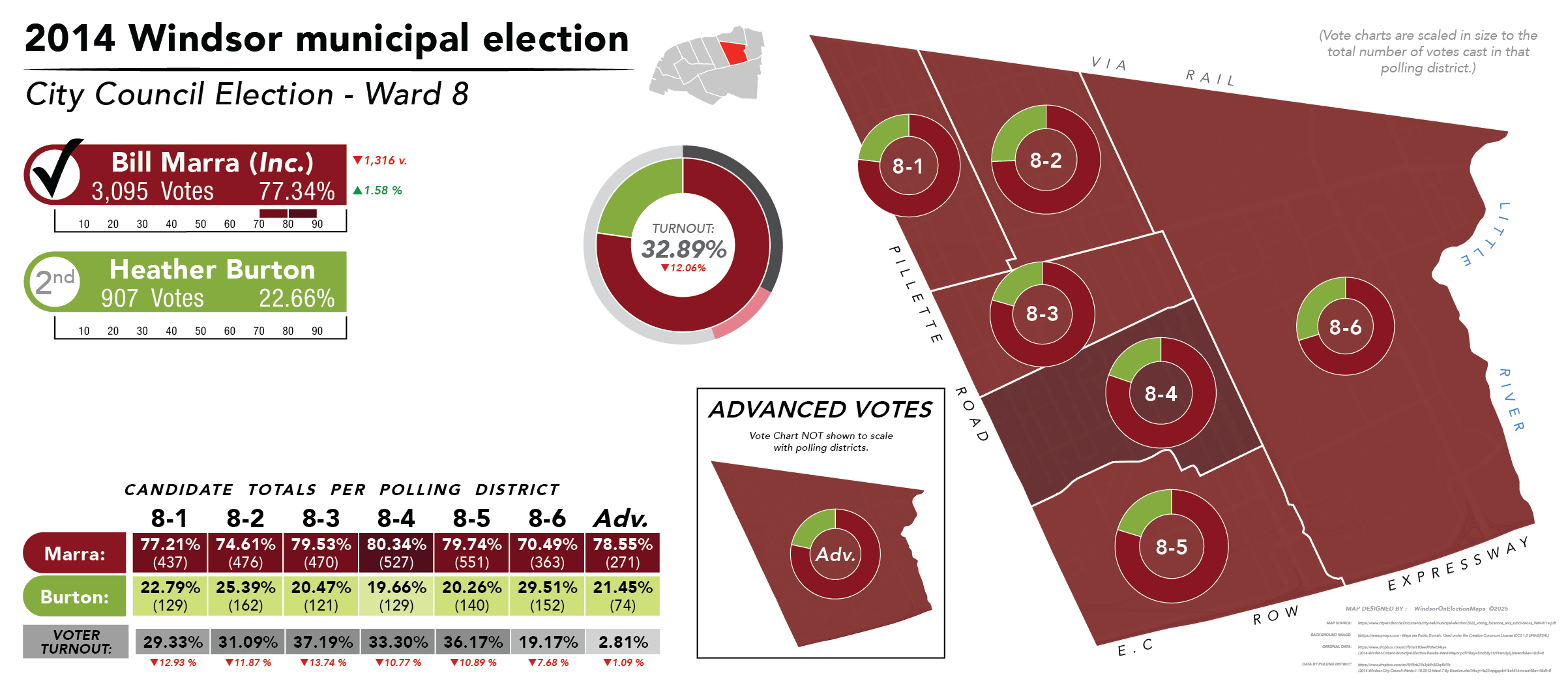
Results of the election in Ward 8. Polling districts are shaded by which candidate gained the majority of the vote.

| Candidate | Popular vote | | |
| Candidate | Votes | % | ±% |
|---|---|---|---|
| Bill Marra (X) | 3,095 | 77.34 | +1.58 |
| Heather Burton | 907 | 22.66 | -- |
| Total valid votes | 4,002 | 97.24 | |
| Total rejected, unmarked and declined votes | 114 | 2.76 | |
| Turnout | 4,116 | 32.89 | -12.06 |
| Eligible voters | 12,513 | | |
Note: Candidate campaign colours are based on the prominent colour used in campaign items (signs, literature, etc.) and are used as a visual differentiation between candidates. Colours from prior party affiliations may be used as well.

=== Ward 9 ===
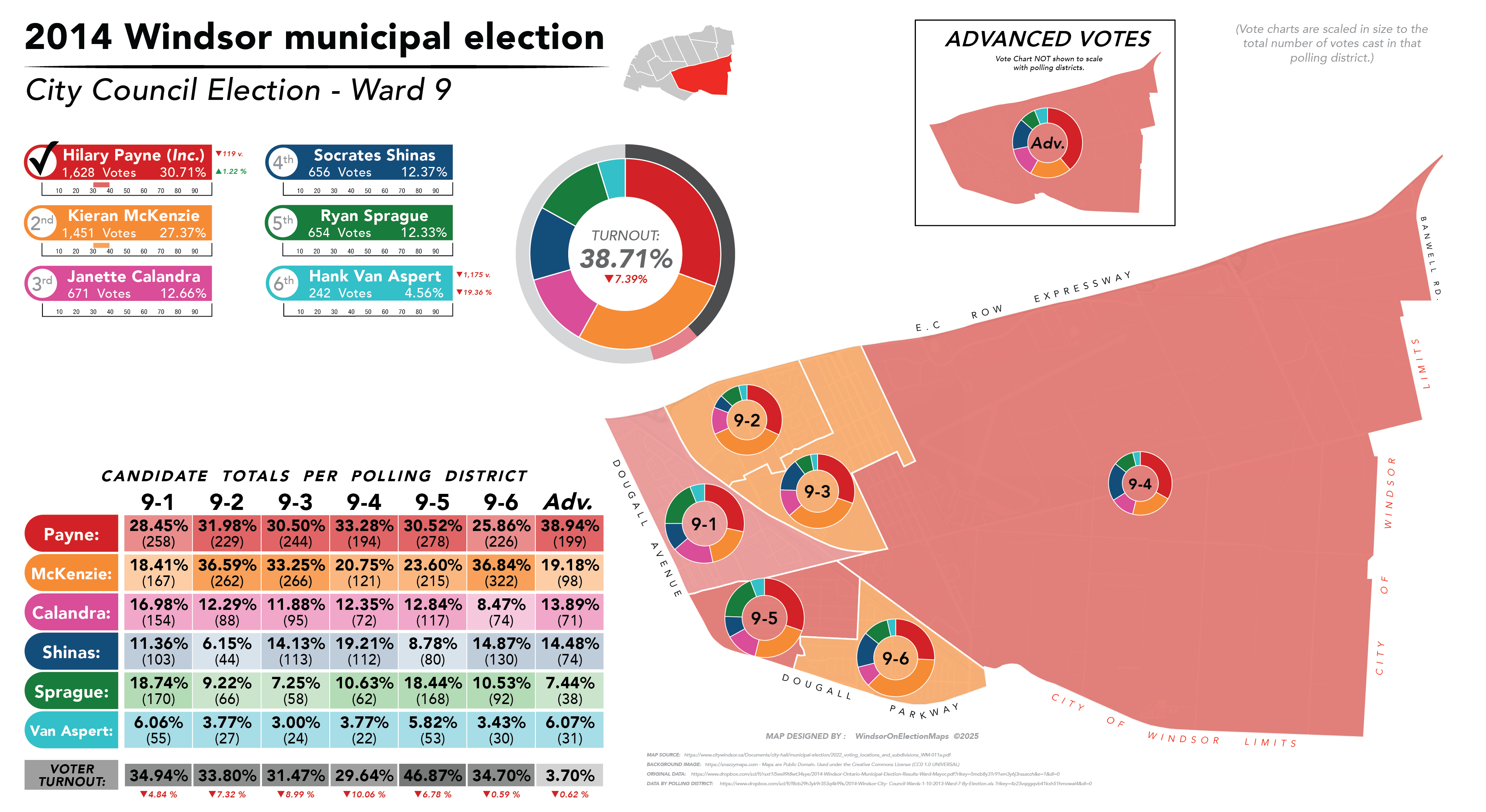
Results of the election in Ward 9. Polling districts are shaded by which candidate gained the majority of the vote.

| Candidate | Popular vote | | |
| Candidate | Votes | % | ±% |
|---|---|---|---|
| Hillary Payne (X) | 1,628 | 30.71 | +1.22 |
| Kieran McKenzie | 1,451 | 27.37 | -- |
| Janette Calandra | 671 | 12.66 | -- |
| Socrates Shinas | 656 | 12.37 | -- |
| Ryan Sprague | 654 | 12.33 | -- |
| Hank Van Aspert | 242 | 4.56 | -19.36 |
| Total valid votes | 5,302 | 98.83 | |
| Total rejected, unmarked and declined votes | 63 | 1.17 | |
| Turnout | 5,365 | 38.71 | -7.39 |
| Eligible voters | 13,858 | | |
Note: Candidate campaign colours are based on the prominent colour used in campaign items (signs, literature, etc.) and are used as a visual differentiation between candidates. Colours from prior party affiliations may be used as well.

=== Ward 10 ===
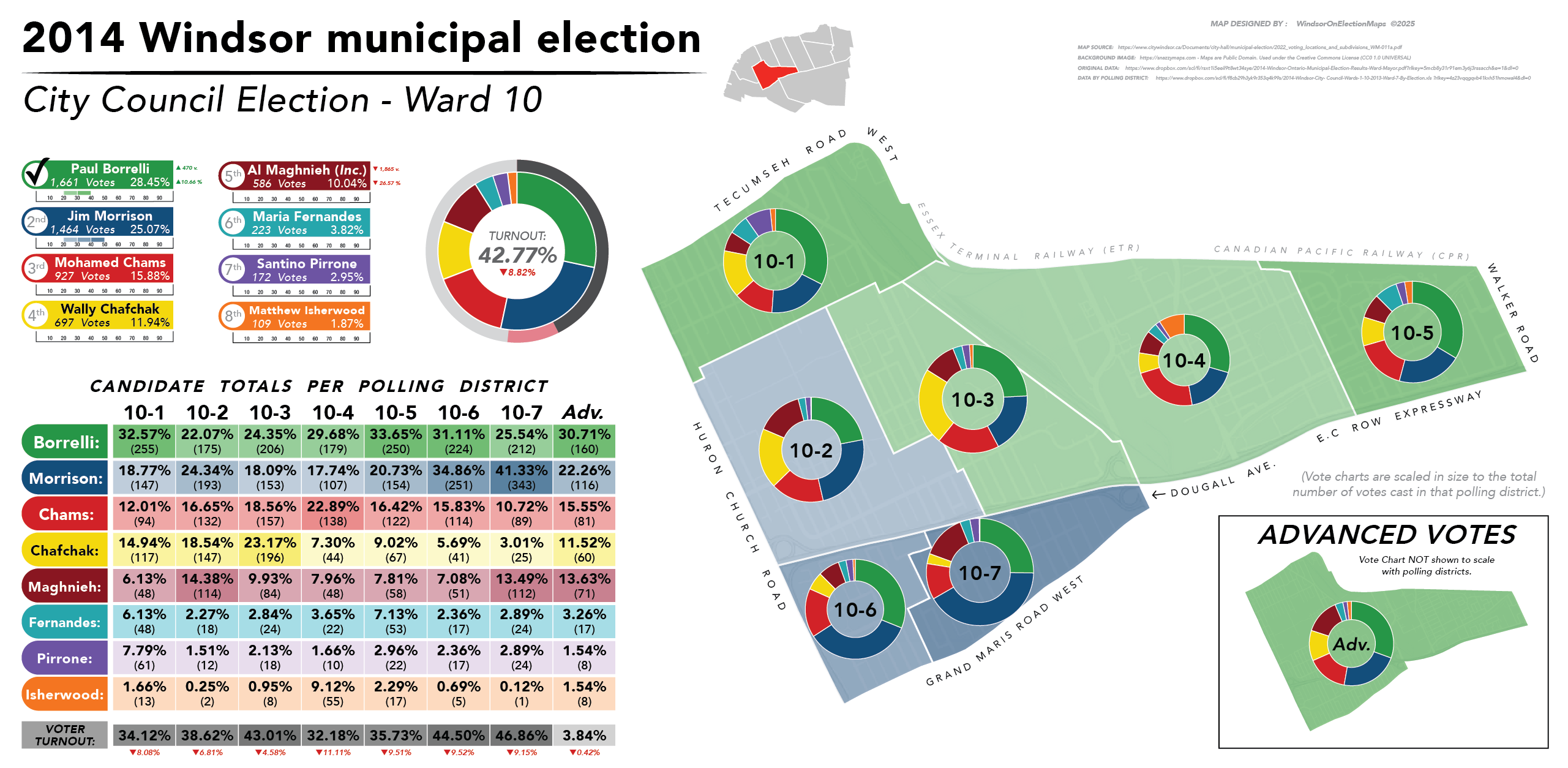
Results of the election in Ward 10. Polling districts are shaded by which candidate gained the majority of the vote.

| Candidate | Popular vote | | |
| Candidate | Votes | % | ±% |
|---|---|---|---|
| Paul Borrelli | 1,661 | 28.45 | +10.06 |
| Jim Morrison | 1,464 | 25.07 | -- |
| Mohamed Chams | 927 | 15.88 | -- |
| Wally Chafchak | 697 | 11.94 | -- |
| Al Magneigh (X) | 586 | 10.04 | -26.57 |
| Maria Fernandes | 223 | 3.82 | -- |
| Santonio Pirrone | 172 | 2.95 | -- |
| Matthew Isherwood | 109 | 1.87 | -- |
| Total valid votes | 5,839 | 98.45 | |
| Total rejected, unmarked and declined votes | 92 | 1.55 | |
| Turnout | 5,931 | 42.77 | -8.82 |
| Eligible voters | 13,868 | | |
Note: Candidate campaign colours are based on the prominent colour used in campaign items (signs, literature, etc.) and are used as a visual differentiation between candidates. Colours from prior party affiliations may be used as well.
