= Mike Hurst (politician) =

Canadian politician

32nd Mayor of Windsor
- In office 1991–2003
- Preceded by: John Millson
- Succeeded by: Eddie Francis

Personal details
- Born: March 9, 1950 (age 76) Windsor, Ontario, Canada
- Education: University of Windsor
- Profession: Lawyer

Michael D. Hurst (born 9 March 1950) is a former municipal politician in Windsor, Ontario, Canada. He served as 32nd Mayor of the city of Windsor from 1991 to 2003, and oversaw several major changes in the city's development.

== Early life and career ==
Hurst was born in Windsor, and holds Bachelor of Arts and Bachelor of Laws degrees from the University of Windsor. He practiced law in private life, and unsuccessfully campaigned for the Windsor city council in 1982.

== Councillor ==
Hurst was elected to the Windsor City Council during a by-election in 1987, and was re-elected the 1988 municipal election. He represented the city's first ward. He was the only member of the Windsor council to vote against a financial bailout for the Windsor Symphony Orchestra in 1988, arguing that the orchestra was making itself financially unviable by spending too much money on new members.

Hurst increased his public profile in early 1991, when he emerged as a prominent opponent of Canadian Broadcasting Corporation's decision to shut down its Windsor-area news department. He was quoted as saying, "We're bombarded by American culture here and the CBC was something that really helped keep us Canadian".

Hurst supported a relaxation of Canada's Sunday shopping laws for communities on the American border, arguing that this step would counter the effects of cross-border shopping on the local economy. He opposed a restrictive shopping law brought forward by the province of Ontario in early 1991.

== Mayor ==
Hurst was elected Mayor of Windsor in the 1991 municipal election, defeating local magazine publisher Jerry Woloschuk. The incumbent mayor, John Millson, did not seek re-election in order to spend more time with his family. Hurst renewed his opposition to Sunday shopping legislation after the election, and indicated that he might attempt to circumvent the law through legal means. He welcomed a 1992 ruling by the Ontario Municipal Board which allowed Sunday shopping in much of Windsor to promote tourism.

=== Major projects ===
Hurst announced in 1992 that he would support the construction of a casino for Windsor, to be built by private enterprise and leased to the province. He argued that fifty million Americans lived within driving distance of the city, and that a casino would greatly improve the city's threatened economy. The plan was accepted by the provincial government of Bob Rae, and casino operations were opened to the public in 1994. Despite concerns about the long-term viability of a casino-centred economy, the project encountered relatively little organized opposition from the local community.

On opening night in 1994, Hurst proclaimed, "These are momentous days for Windsor. Windsor is a city of hope." One year later, with the casino generating strong revenues, he said, "It's changed the city forever." The permanent Casino Windsor building was opened in 1998.

Hurst also made several efforts to build a new arena in downtown Windsor, although these plans were beset with various delays. In the late 1990s, he championed a successful plan to construct an office tower complex for Chrysler Canada Ltd.

Hurst was instrumental in the removal of the Holiday Inn ( Plywood Palace ) on the Northside of Riverside Drive in April 1999 two weeks before demolition the structure burnt. This opened up continuous public access for over 5 kilometers " a jewel in the Crown for the City of Windsor "

=== Relations with the provincial government ===
Hurst criticized the provincial government in April 1993 for cancelling a plan to relocate government jobs from Toronto to other communities. The Rae government had planned to decentralize the public sector after coming to office but was forced to change its plans in the face of a serious recession.

In 1997, Hurst criticized the provincial government of Mike Harris (who succeeded Rae as premier in 1995) for introducing a bill to give the province extensive powers over public sector unions. He argued that it was unhelpful and unnecessarily confrontational. He also criticized the government's downloading of provincial services to the municipalities, arguing that the municipalities lost money from the arrangement. Hurst was himself asked to run for Harris's Progressive Conservative Party in a 1997 by-election, but declined.

In 1999, Hurst accused provincial cabinet minister Steve Gilchrist of putting himself in a conflict-of-interest situation by suggesting his personal lawyer as a government contact. Hurst says that he rejected the offer outright; Gilchrist denied having seriously made the offer. Hurst later indicated that he would not enforce the Harris government's laws against panhandling. In 2003, he commended Harris's successor Ernie Eves for promising to invest $625 million over five years in the auto sector.

=== Other ===
Hurst also welcomed the return of Canadian Broadcasting Corporation operations to Windsor in 1993.

The Windsor City Council voted to license escort services in 1996, as a means of providing legal protection for vulnerable sex-trade workers. Hurst opposed the licensing law, although he later acknowledged that it did not generate any complaints.

In 2002, two city employees were fired over allegations of the misleading council over lease agreements with MFP Financial Services. One of the employees was also accused of accepting "personal benefits" from MFP. Hurst was strongly critical of the company's role in the matter.

Later in the same year, Hurst threatened to call a state of emergency if the provincial and federal governments did not look into the issue of American-board trucks causing gridlock in the city. There were reports that urban gridlock was promoting an economic downturn for the community.

Hurst was re-elected in 1994, 1997 and 2000, each time by a significant margin.

== Current activities ==
Hurst supported a controversial Detroit River Tunnel Partnership plan near the end of his final term, and he was hired as chief executive officer of the partnership's Jobs Tunnel project in January 2004. He was fifty-three years old at the time. In 2011, Hurst was named a Justice of the Peace and works out of the Provincial Court in Windsor, Ontario.
