= 1988 Ontario municipal elections =

Municipal elections were held in municipalities across Ontario, Canada on November 14, 1988 to elect mayors, reeves, councillors and school trustees.

== Results ==
=== Elected mayors ===
- Barrie: Janice Laking
- Brampton: Ken Whillans
- Brantford: Karen George
- Burlington: Rolly Burt
- Cambridge: Jane Brewer
- Cornwall: Phil Poirier
- East York: David Johnson (details)
- Etobicoke: Bruce Sinclair (details)
- Gloucester: Harry Allen (details)
- Guelph: John Counsell
- Hamilton: Bob Morrow (details)
- Kingston: Helen Cooper
- Kitchener: Dominic Cardillo
- London: Tom Gosnell
- Markham: Tony Roman
- Mississauga: Hazel McCallion
- Nepean: Ben Franklin (details)
- Niagara Falls: William Smeaton
- North Bay: Stan Lawlor
- North York: Mel Lastman (details)
- Oakville: Ann Mulvale
- Oshawa: Allan Pilkey
- Ottawa: Jim Durrell (details)
- Peterborough: Sylvia Sutherland
- Pickering: Wayne Arthurs
- Richmond Hill: Bill Bell
- Sarnia: Mike Bradley
- Sault Ste. Marie: Joseph Fratesi
- Scarborough: Joyce Trimmer (details)
- St. Catharines: Joe McCaffery
- Sudbury: Peter Wong
- Thunder Bay: Jack Masters
- Timmins: Dennis Welin
- Toronto: Art Eggleton (details)
- Vaughan: Lorna Jackson
- Waterloo: Brian Turnbull
- Welland: Roland Hardy
- Whitby: Bob Attersley
- Windsor: John Millson
- York: Fergy Brown (details)

=== Brantford ===
1988 Brantford municipal election: Mayor
Candidate	Votes	%
(x)Karen George	17,611	65.09
Pat Luciani	7,859	29.05
Roy Jones	945	3.49
William Stewart	640	2.37
Total valid votes	27,055	100.00

Source for election returns: Hamilton Spectator, 15 November 1988.

== See also ==
- 1988 Toronto municipal election
- 1988 Ottawa municipal election
- 1988 Hamilton, Ontario municipal election
- 1988 Windsor municipal election
