= Jim Bennett (politician) =

Canadian politician

Member of the Newfoundland and Labrador House of Assembly for St. Barbe
- In office November 27, 2011 – November 27, 2015
- Preceded by: Wallace Young
- Succeeded by: District abolished

Leader of the Newfoundland and Labrador Liberal Party
- In office February 6, 2006 – May 29, 2006
- Preceded by: Gerry Reid (interim)
- Succeeded by: Gerry Reid

Personal details
- Born: Daniel's Harbour, Newfoundland, Canada
- Party: Liberal
- Spouse: Sandra Pupatello
- Occupation: Lawyer
- Website: www.jimbennett.ca

Jim Bennett is a Canadian author, lawyer and former politician in Newfoundland and Labrador. He was elected as the Member of the House of Assembly for St. Barbe in the 2011 provincial election serving until 2015. In 2006, Bennett was acclaimed leader of the Liberal Party of Newfoundland and Labrador, but resigned from the post after just three months. In 2013, Bennett unsuccessfully ran for the leadership of the provincial Liberal Party in their 2013 election.

== Politics ==
Bennett entered provincial politics in 2006, after he was acclaimed leader of the Liberal Party. Due to internal conflicts with his party Bennett resigned as leader after just three months. He was replaced by former interim leader Gerry Reid. In the 2007 general election he was unsuccessful in his bid to defeat Progressive Conservative incumbent Wallace Young. Bennett was elected to the Daniel's Harbour town council in the September 2009 municipal elections.

In March 2010, Bennett was hired by the town of St. Anthony to help in a legal case over the moving of air ambulance service to Labrador. He filed an injunction to stop the province from moving the air ambulance services but was unsuccessful.

In 2011, he once again ran in St. Barbe and this time was successful in defeating Young. In March 2012, the governing Progressive Conservatives announced that a month earlier Bennett had left what they considered to be a threatening voice mail at cabinet minister Joan Burke's office. Bennett, who had been seeking help for a constituent, said in the recording that "If this problem is not resolved today, you can expect me to absolutely vilify your minister on Monday morning on Open Line." He went on to say "I will absolutely trash your minister, say what a bunch of idiots she’s got working in her department. Fix the problem and fix it today, or there will be lots of trouble." Bennett apologized in the House of Assembly for the message.

In 2013, Bennett unsuccessfully ran for the leadership of the provincial Liberal Party in their 2013 election.

Bennett's district of St. Barbe was abolished in the 2015 redrawing of districts, he unsuccessfully ran for the Liberal nomination in the district of Lewisporte-Twillingate. Following his nomination lost he subsequently retired following the 2015 election.

== Personal life ==
Bennett is a lawyer, and is married to Sandra Pupatello, a former member of the Legislative Assembly of Ontario and Minister of Economic Development and Trade in the Ontario Liberal Party government of Dalton McGuinty.

Bennett is based in the western Newfoundland coast community of Daniel's Harbour after living a number of years in Windsor, Ontario. While living in Windsor, Bennett twice unsuccessfully sought election to Windsor's city council.

== Electoral history ==
2013 Liberal Party of Newfoundland and Labrador leadership election
	Ballot 1				Ballot 2				Ballot 3			
Candidate	Votes	%	Points	%	Votes	%	Points	%	Votes	%	Points	%
Dwight Ball	10,944	45.94%	2,130.05	44.38%	11,306	48.45%	2,257.15	47.02%	12,598	60.64%	2,832.29	59.01%
Paul Antle	6,340	26.61%	1,321.15	27.52%	6,600	28.28%	1,397.86	29.12%	8,178	39.36%	1,967.71	40.99%
Cathy Bennett	5,252	22.05%	1,089.05	22.69%	5,431	23.27%	1,144.99	23.85%				
Danny Dumaresque	670	2.81%	131.69	2.74%								
Jim Bennett	617	2.59%	128.05	2.67%								
Total	23,823	100.00	4,800.00	100.00	23,337	100.00	4,800.00	100.00	20,776	100.00	4,800.00	100.00

St. Barbe - Newfoundland and Labrador general election, 2011
Party	Candidate	Votes	%	±%
Liberal	Jim Bennett	1816	45.05%	
Progressive Conservative	Wallace Young	1778	44.11%	–
NDP	Diane Ryan	437	10.84%	

St. Barbe - 2007 Newfoundland and Labrador general election
Party	Candidate	Votes	%	±%
Progressive Conservative	Wallace Young	2491	58.65%	–
Liberal	Jim Bennett	1560	36.73%	
NDP	Gary B. Noel	196	4.62%	

2000 Windsor municipal election: Ward 2 (two members elected)
Candidate	Votes	%
(x)Brian Masse	4,908	32.36
(x)Peter Carlesimo	3,430	22.61
Jim Bennett	2,861	18.86
Graham Wilson	1,274	8.40
Lawrence Holland	1,144	7.54
Frank DiPierdomenico	714	4.71
Kevin Flood	373	2.46
Bob Harper	336	2.22
Bowen Alkemade	128	0.84
Total votes	15,168	100.00

1997 Windsor municipal election: Ward 2 (two members elected)
Candidate	Votes	%
Brian Masse	3,425	26.20
(x) Peter Carlesimo	2,865	21.91
Jim Bennett	2,491	19.05
Rolly Marentette	1,613	12.34
George Dadamo	1,587	12.14
Gail Zdyb	597	4.57
Robert Potomski	496	3.79
Total votes	13,074	100.00

Preceded by Gerry Reid (Interim)	Leader of the Liberal Party of Newfoundland and Labrador; February 2006 - May 2006	Succeeded by Gerry Reid
