= 2013 Liberal Party of Newfoundland and Labrador leadership election =

Canadian provincial party leadership race

- November 15–17, 2013
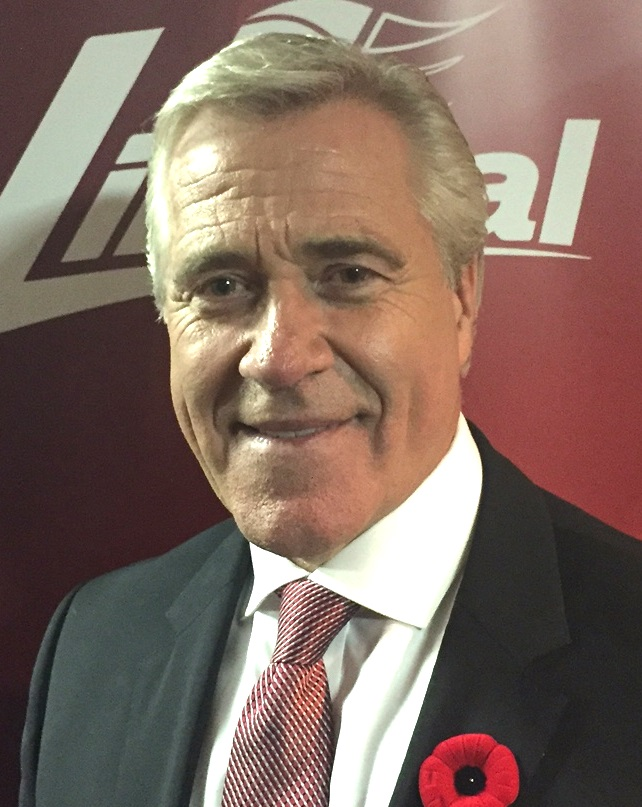

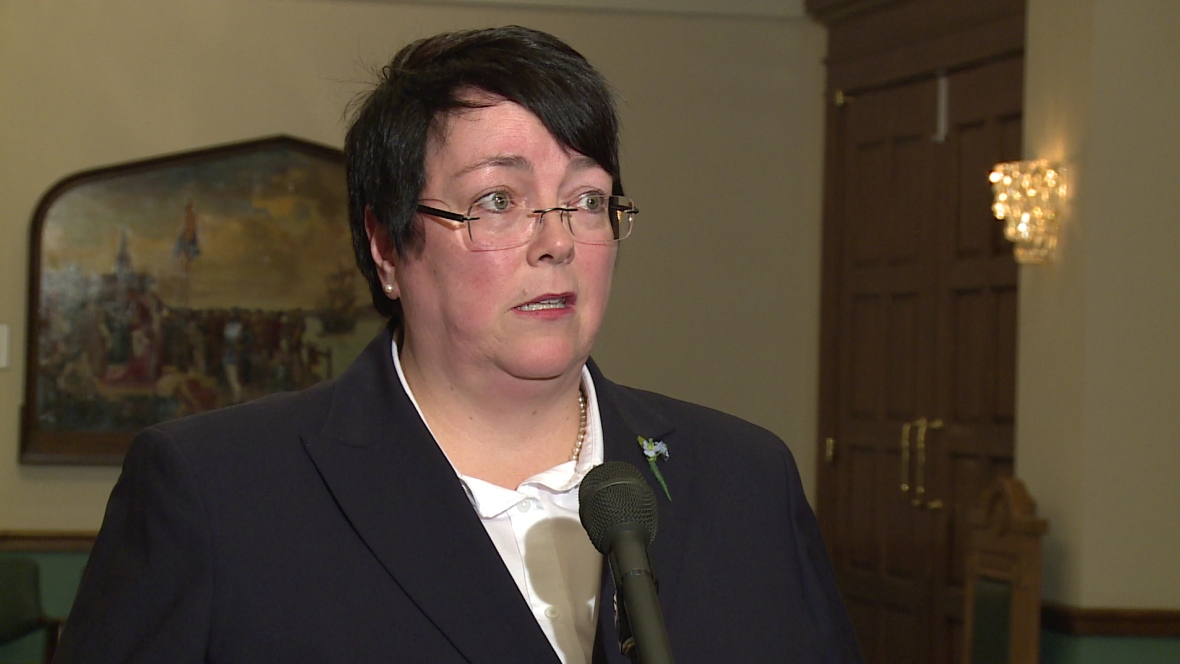
		PA
Candidate	Dwight Ball	Paul Antle	Cathy Bennett
Final ballot	12,598 (60.64%)	8,178 (39.36%)	Eliminated
First ballot	10,944 (45.94%)	6,340 (26.61%)	5,252 (22.05%)
Leader before election
Kevin Aylward
Leader after election
Dwight Ball

2013 Liberal Party of Newfoundland and Labrador leadership election
- Date: November 15–17, 2013
- Convention: St. John's Convention Centre
- Resigning leader: Kevin Aylward
- Won by: Dwight Ball
- Ballots: 3
- Candidates: 5
- Entrance fee: $20,000

The Liberal Party of Newfoundland and Labrador leadership election of 2013 was triggered by Kevin Aylward's announcement on October 26, 2011, that he would resign as leader following the party's result in the 2011 provincial election. It was announced on December 15, 2011, that Humber Valley MHA Dwight Ball would start serving as interim leader of the party on January 3, 2012. In May 2012, the party announced the leadership convention would take place between November 15–17, 2013. It was won by Dwight Ball, who had stepped down as interim leader in July 2013 to run.

== Candidates ==
=== Paul Antle ===
Background: Antle is a St. John's businessman, who was the Liberal Party of Canada's candidate in St. John's East in the 2006 federal election. Antle has said he is considering running for leader, but he wants the party to push back the leadership race so that it is closer to scheduled 2015 provincial election.
Campaign website: www.paulantle.ca
Date campaign launched: July 11, 2013
Supporters

- MHAs:
- Former MHAs: Kevin Aylward, Former Provincial Liberal Leader 2011, Former MHA for St. George's-Stephenville East
- Federal politicians: Scott Andrews, MP for Avalon; Hon. George Baker, Senator; Hon. George Furey, Senator; Scott Simms, MP for Bonavista—Gander—Grand Falls—Windsor
- Municipal politicians:
- Other prominent individuals:

=== Dwight Ball ===
Background: MHA for Humber Valley (2007, 2011-present); Interim Leader of the Liberal Party and Leader of the Official Opposition (2012-July 2013)
Campaign website: www.dwightball.ca
Date campaign launched: July 5, 2013
Supporters

- MHAs: (5) Lisa Dempster, MHA for Cartwright-L'Anse au Clair; Randy Edmunds, MHA for Torngat Mountains; Eddie Joyce, MHA for Bay of Islands; Tom Osborne, MHA for St. John's South; Andrew Parsons, MHA for Burgeo-La Poile.
- Former MHAs: Gerry Reid, Former Provincial Liberal Leader 2005-2006, 2006-2007, Former MHA for The Isles of Notre Dame
- Federal politicians: Gerry Byrne, MP for Humber—St. Barbe—Baie Verte; Judy Foote, MP for Random—Burin—St. George's; Yvonne Jones, MP for Labrador
- Municipal politicians:
- Other prominent individuals:

=== Cathy Bennett ===
Background: Bennett is a St. John's businesswomen, former president of the St. John's Board of Trade. Also spent 5 years on the Nalcor Board of Directors.
Date campaign launched: July 3, 2013
Campaign website: cathybennett.ca
Supporters

- MHAs:
- Former MHAs: Beaton Tulk, Former Premier 2000-2001, Former MHA For Bonavista North; Tom Lush, Former MHA for Terra Nova
- Federal politicians: Siobhan Coady, Former MP for St. John's South-Mount Pearl
- Municipal politicians:
- Other prominent individuals: Alan Doyle Lead Singer of Great Big Sea, Dean MacDonald

=== Jim Bennett ===
Background: Bennett was elected MHA for St. Barbe the 2011 general election. He was acclaimed leader of the Liberal Party in 2006 but resigned after just three months in the job. He was also the Liberal candidate in the district of St. Barbe in 2007, but was defeated by the Progressive Conservative incumbent.
Campaign website: liberalleaderjim.blogspot.ca
Date campaign launched: June 28, 2013
Supporters

- MHAs:
- Former MHAs:
- Federal politicians:
- Municipal politicians:
- Other prominent individuals:

=== Danny Dumaresque ===
Background: Dumaresque is the former member of the House of Assembly for Eagle River, serving between 1989 and 1996. In the 1996 general election he was defeated by independent Yvonne Jones. From 2006 to 2009 he served as President of the Liberal Party of Newfoundland and Labrador. Dumaresque was the Liberal candidate in the district of Torngat Mountains in 2007 and the district of The Isles of Notre Dame in 2011. He was a candidate in the leadership election to replace Jones in August 2011.
Campaign website: dannydumaresque.ca
Date campaign launched: July 2, 2013
Supporters

- MHAs:
- Former MHAs:
- Federal politicians: John Efford Former MP for Bonavista—Trinity—Conception.
- Municipal politicians:
- Other prominent individuals:

=== Declined ===
- Gerry Byrne, MP for Humber—St. Barbe—Baie Verte
- Brad Cabana, Political Blogger
- Siobhan Coady, Former MP for St. John's South—Mount Pearl
- Dean MacDonald, St. John's businessman
- Andrew Parsons, MHA for Burgeo-La Poile
- Scott Simms, MP for Bonavista—Gander—Grand Falls—Windsor

=== Nomination rejected ===
- Charles Murphy, West Coast Businessman who has nominated for this leadership election but his nomination has been rejected.

== Results ==
= Winner

Results
	Ballot 1				Ballot 2				Ballot 3			
Candidate	Votes	%	Points	%	Votes	%	Points	%	Votes	%	Points	%
Dwight Ball	10,944	45.94%	2,130.05	44.38%	11,306	48.45%	2,257.15	47.02%	12,598	60.64%	2,832.29	59.01%
Paul Antle	6,340	26.61%	1,321.15	27.52%	6,600	28.28%	1,397.86	29.12%	8,178	39.36%	1,967.71	40.99%
Cathy Bennett	5,252	22.05%	1,089.05	22.69%	5,431	23.27%	1,144.99	23.85%				
Danny Dumaresque	670	2.81%	131.69	2.74%								
Jim Bennett	617	2.59%	128.05	2.67%								
Total	23,823	100.00	4,800.00	100.00	23,337	100.00	4,800.00	100.00	20,776	100.00	4,800.00	100.00

== See also ==
- List of Liberal Party of Newfoundland and Labrador leadership elections
