= 1997 Windsor municipal election =

The 1997 Windsor municipal election was held in the Canadian city of Windsor, Ontario, to elect a mayor, councillors and school trustees.

== Results ==
1997 Windsor municipal election: Council, Ward Two (two members elected)
Candidate	Votes	%
Brian Masse	3,425	26.20
(x) Peter Carlesimo	2,865	21.91
Jim Bennett	2,491	19.05
Rolly Marentette	1,613	12.34
George Dadamo	1,587	12.14
Gail Zdyb	597	4.57
Robert Potomski	496	3.79
Total votes	13,074	100.00

- Rolly Marentette is a labour activist, and has served for several years as chair of the Windsor District Labour Council's Health and Safety Committee. He was a member of the Essex County District Health Council in the mid-1990s, but was not reappointed by the provincial government of Mike Harris in 1996. He was also a board member of the Community Care Access Centre until 2002, when he resigned to protest the provincial government's management policies. Marentette has been involved with local environmental groups such the Windsor and District Clean Water Alliance, and was actively involved in composting and recycling projects in the early 1990s. In 1998, he called for improved safety measures in the farming sector. Marentette is a member of the New Democratic Party.
- Gail Zdyb is a community activist. She gained local fame in the late 1990s for opposing liquor-licensed establishments in the Ouellette Avenue region. Zdyb argued that these bars were frequented by rowdy patrons, many of whom came from the United States. In 2003, she supported a ban on new entertainment lounges in the city centre.
- Robert Joseph Potomski is a businessman, and a frequent candidate for public office. He campaigned for the second Windsor council ward in 1985, 1988, 1997 and in a 2002 by-election, and also campaigned for a seat on the Roman Catholic Separate School Board in 1991, 2000 and 2003. He is seeking the latter position again in 2006. He was thirty-eight years old in 1988, and was described as a frequent critic of the city's spending policies. Potomski was later treasurer of the parents' association at St. James school, and was involved in a controversy over how to spend $10,000 raised for school improvements. He supported deregulation of the city's taxicab industry in 1993.
