= Brian Masse =

Canadian politician

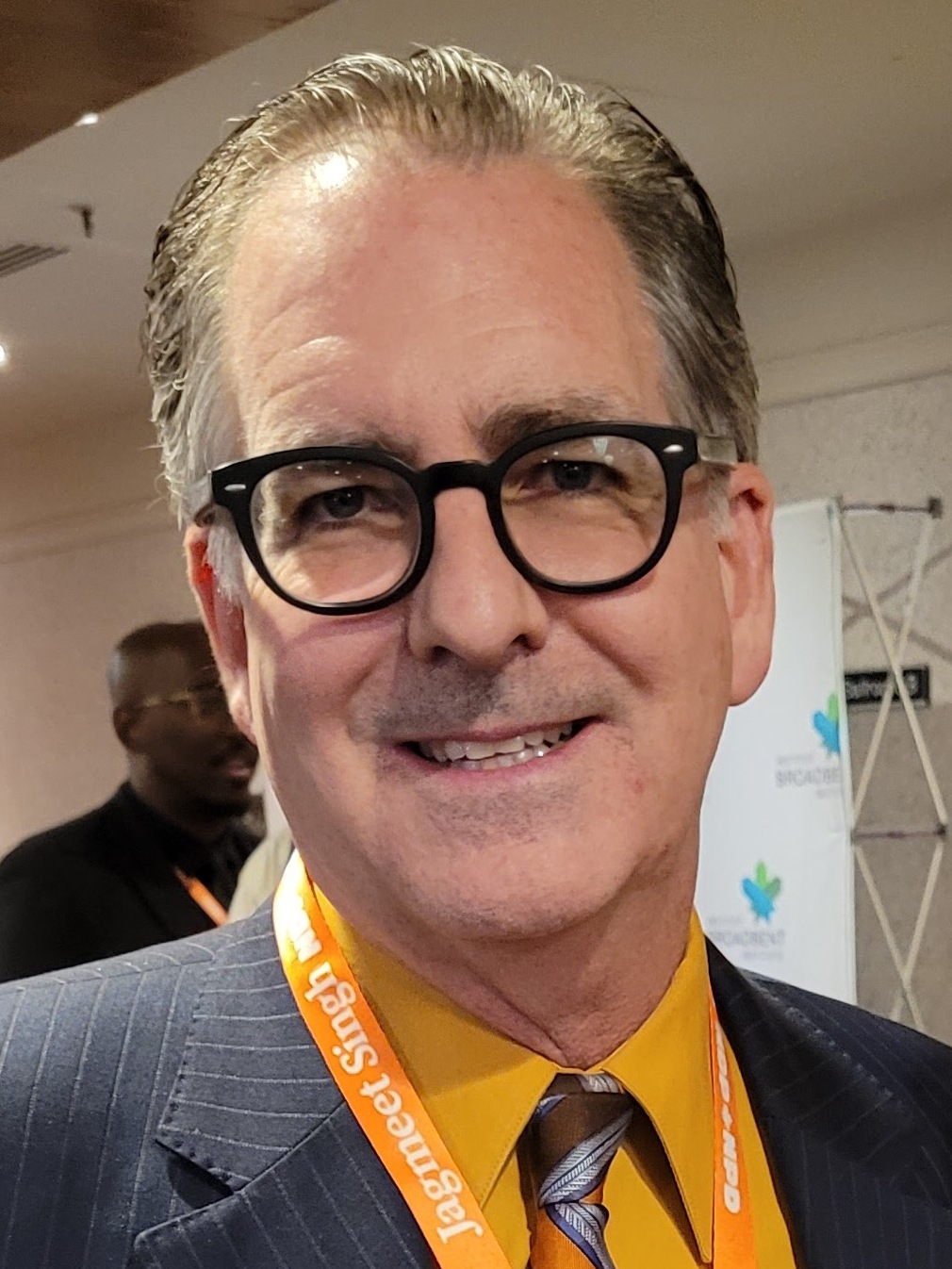
- Masse in 2023

Member of Parliament for Windsor West
- In office May 13, 2002 – April 28, 2025
- Preceded by: Herb Gray
- Succeeded by: Harb Gill

Windsor City Councillor
- In office December 1, 1997 – May 13, 2002 Serving with Peter Carlesimo
- Preceded by: Sheila Wisdom
- Succeeded by: Ronald Jones
- Constituency: Ward 2

Personal details
- Born: July 9, 1968 (age 58) Windsor, Ontario, Canada
- Party: New Democratic Party
- Spouse: Terry Chow
- Children: 2
- Education: University of Windsor; Wilfrid Laurier University
- Profession: Member of Parliament
- Website: https://www.brianmasse.ca/

Brian S. Masse (born July 9, 1968) is a Canadian politician. He served in the House of Commons of Canada from 2002 until the 2025 Canadian federal election, representing the riding of Windsor West as a member of the New Democratic Party.

== Early life and career ==
Masse was born in Windsor, Ontario. He graduated from Wilfrid Laurier University after earning a Bachelor of Arts degree in sociology in 1991. He also completed coursework for a Master of Arts degree at the University of Windsor, but left prior to submitting his thesis.

During the 1990s, he was a job developer for the Association for Persons with Physical Disabilities and a program coordinator for the Multicultural Council of Windsor and Essex County.

Masse was elected for Ward 2 of the Windsor City Council in 1997 and was re-elected in 2000. In 1998, he played a prominent role in preventing a rock-crushing operation from opening in the Wellington Avenue area.

In May 2001, the Windsor City Council unanimously approved Masse's motion to prevent school boards from selling vacant property lots at the highest market value. His purpose was to dissuade boards from closing schools, though some criticized the motion as working against taxpayer interests. Masse later called for a referendum on a proposed new arena project, but this was not accepted by council.

Masse is married to Terry Chow, with whom he has two children.

== Member of Parliament ==
Masse joined the federal New Democratic Party in 1997 and was first elected to the Canadian Parliament in a by-election held on May 13, 2002. The election was called after the resignation of Herb Gray, a long-time Liberal cabinet minister who had been a member of Parliament (MP) since 1962. Masse won the NDP nomination without opposition and defeated Liberal candidate Richard Pollock by 2,477 votes to win the seat. He was re-elected by a greater margin in the 2004 general election. Masse's success in 2002 was partly due to support from Joe Comartin, a fellow Windsor New Democrat who was elected to the House of Commons in the 2000 federal election. In 2002–03, Masse supported Comartin's bid for the NDP leadership.

Masse served as the NDP critic for Auto Policy, Canada Border Services, and Customs in the 38th Canadian Parliament. He also became a member of the newly formed all-party "Border Caucus", examining aspects of Canada-U.S. trade relations. In 2004, he introduced a motion to restrict pharmaceutical companies from renewing their patent protection.

During his first campaign for the House of Commons, the Windsor Star ran an editorial opposing him as "a bench-warmer, a yes-man, a political careerist". Two years later, however, a Star columnist wrote that Masse had "vastly exceeded expectations and quickly developed into an able, hard-working representative who has stayed on top of riding issues."

Masse was re-elected in the 2006 federal election with an increased majority over Liberal Werner Keller. He served as NDP Deputy Industry Critic. After the election, Masse and Comartin spoke out against the provincial NDP's decision to remove Canadian Auto Workers leader Buzz Hargrove from the party.

Masse has criticized Industry Minister Maxime Bernier's plans to deregulate Canada's telecommunications market and ease restrictions on foreign ownership, arguing that the reforms could result in a small number of companies controlling the Canadian industry.

Since 2015, Masse has sat on the NDP frontbench as the critic for Innovation, Science and Economic Development.

Masse was re-elected in the 2019 Canadian federal election and the 2021 Canadian federal election, on both occasions finishing ahead of former Liberal MPP Sandra Pupatello.

In the 2025 Canadian federal election, he was unseated by Conservative candidate Harb Gill. He offered to endorse defeated Conservative MP Rick Perkins in the election.

== Electoral record ==
=== Federal ===
Graph of election results in Windsor West which Masse ran in (minor parties that never got 2% of the vote or didn't run consistently are omitted)

2025 Canadian federal election: Windsor West
Party	Candidate	Votes	%	±%	Expenditures
Conservative	Harb Gill	21,412	39.01	+19.67	
Liberal	Richard Pollock	16,986	30.95	+3.18	
New Democratic	Brian Masse	15,256	27.79	−16.45	
People's	Jacob Bezaire	553	1.01	−7.33	
Green	Louay Ahmad	397	0.72	N/A	
Communist	Joseph Markham	195	0.36	N/A	
Marxist–Leninist	Margaret Villamizar	89	0.16	−0.15	
Total valid votes/expense limit		54,888	99.19		
Total rejected ballots		446	0.81		
Turnout		55,334	58.60		
Eligible voters		94,427			
Conservative notional gain from New Democratic		Swing		+8.25	
Source: Elections Canada
Note: number of eligible voters does not include voting day registrations.

2021 Canadian federal election: Windsor West
Party	Candidate	Votes	%	±%	Expenditures
New Democratic	Brian Masse	21,702	44.1	+4.0	$88,457.01
Liberal	Sandra Pupatello	13,670	27.9	-8.4	$86,067.85
Conservative	Anthony Orlando	9,436	19.1	—	none listed
People's	Matthew Giancola	4,080	8.0	+6.2	$5,606.67
Marxist–Leninist	Margaret Villamizar	156	0.1	+0.08	$0.00
Total valid votes/expense limit		48,693	99.0	–	$120,365.34
Total rejected ballots		504	1.0		
Turnout		49,197	53.4		
Eligible voters		92,207			
New Democratic hold		Swing		+6.2	
Source: Elections Canada

2019 Canadian federal election: Windsor West
Party	Candidate	Votes	%	±%	Expenditures
New Democratic	Brian Masse	20,800	40.03	-11.32	$105,980.25
Liberal	Sandra Pupatello	18,878	36.33	+11.08	$107,376.65
Conservative	Henry Lau	9,925	19.10	-1.65	–
Green	Quinn Hunt	1,325	2.55	+0.24	–
People's	Darryl Burrel	958	1.84	–	–
Marxist–Leninist	Margaret Villamizar	76	0.15	-0.20	–
Total valid votes/expense limit		51,962	98.93		
Total rejected ballots		560	1.07	+0.46	
Turnout		52,522	55.32	+0.55	
Eligible voters		94,944			
New Democratic hold		Swing		-11.20	
Source: Elections Canada

2015 Canadian federal election
Party	Candidate	Votes	%	±%	Expenditures
New Democratic	Brian Masse	24,085	51.35	-2.98	$80,089.86
Liberal	Dave Sundin	11,842	25.25	+14.36	$29,218.35
Conservative	Henry Lau	9,734	20.75	-10.89	$16,790.47
Green	Cora LaRussa	1,083	2.31	-0.45	–
Marxist–Leninist	Margaret Villamizar	161	0.34	-0.04	–
Total valid votes/Expense limit		46,905	100.0		$222,985.73
Total rejected ballots		284	–	–	
Turnout		47,189	–	–	
Eligible voters		86,166			
Source: Elections Canada
New Democratic Party hold					

2011 Canadian federal election
Party	Candidate	Votes	%	±%	Expenditures
New Democratic	Brian Masse	21,592	54.33	+1.79	–
Conservative	Lisa Lumley	12,577	31.64	+9.06	–
Liberal	Melanie Deveau	4,327	10.89	-7.70	–
Green	Alishia Fox	1,096	2.76	-2.92	–
Marxist–Leninist	Margaret Villamizar	153	0.38	+0.09	–
Total valid votes		39,745	100.00	–	
Total rejected ballots		257	0.64	-0.06	
Turnout		40,002	49.13	+1.80	
Eligible voters		81,428	–	–	
New Democratic Party hold					

2008 Canadian federal election: Windsor West
Party	Candidate	Votes	%	±%	Expenditures
New Democratic	Brian Masse	20,791	52.5%	+3.01%	$55,997
Conservative	Lisa Lumley	8,954	22.6%	+2.49%	$61,153
Liberal	Larry Horwitz	7,357	18.6%	−6.79%	$52,616
Green	John Esposito	2,253	5.7%	+2.67%	$132
Communist	Elizabeth Rowley	125	0.3%		$373
Marxist–Leninist	Margaret Villamizar	116	0.3%	+0.07%	
Total valid votes		39,596	99.3%		
Total rejected ballots		281	0.7%		
Turnout		39 877	47.3%		
Electors on the lists		84 245			
Sources: Official Results, Elections Canada and Financial Returns, Elections Canada.

2006 Canadian federal election: Windsor West
Party	Candidate	Votes	%	±%	Expenditures
New Democratic	Brian Masse	23,608	49.49	+3.52	$76,342
Liberal	Werner Keller	12,110	25.39	−5.93	$55,858
Conservative	Al Teshuba	9,592	20.11	+1.20	$77,898
Green	Jillana Bishop	1,444	3.03	−0.47	$2,450
Progressive Canadian	Chris Schnurr	614	1.29	–	$731
Independent	Habib Zaidi	224	0.47	–	$3,631
Marxist–Leninist	Enver Villamizar	108	0.23	−0.07	
Total valid votes		47,700	99.31		
Total rejected ballots		329	0.69	+0.08	
Turnout		48,029	57.29	+3.20	
Electors on the lists		83,839			
Sources: Official Results, Elections Canada and Financial Returns, Elections Canada.

2004 Canadian federal election: Windsor West
Party	Candidate	Votes	%	±%	Expenditures
New Democratic	Brian Masse	20,297	45.97	+30.01	$77,487
Liberal	Richard Pollock	13,831	31.32	−22.80	$74,197
Conservative	Jordan Katz	8,348	18.91	−9.63	$69,771
Green	Rob Spring	1,545	3.50		$4,721
Marxist–Leninist	Enver Villamizar	134	0.30		$300
Total valid votes		44,155	99.39		
Total rejected ballots		273	0.61	0.00	
Turnout		44,428	54.09	+11.08	
Electors on the lists		82,143			
Percentage change figures are factored for redistribution. Conservative Party percentages are contrasted with the combined Canadian Alliance and Progressive Conservative percentages from 2000.
Sources: Official Results, Elections Canada and Financial Returns, Elections Canada.

Canadian federal by-election, May 13, 2002: Windsor West
Party	Candidate	Votes	%	±%	Expenditures
New Democratic	Brian Masse	14,021	42.69	+26.79	$65,195
Liberal	Richard Pollock	11,544	35.15	−19.06	$64,964
Alliance	Rick Fuschi	5,420	16.50	−6.45	$60,657
Progressive Conservative	Ian West	957	2.91	−2.62	$11,212
Green	Chris Holt	655	1.99	–	$9,246
Christian Heritage	Allan James	249	0.76	–	$2,072
Total valid votes		32,846	99.39		
Total rejected ballots		200	0.61		
Turnout		33,046	43.01		
Electors on the lists		76,825			
New Democratic Party gain from Liberal					

=== Municipal ===
2000 Windsor municipal election: Ward 2 (two members elected)
Candidate	Votes	%
(x)Brian Masse	4,908	32.36
(x)Peter Carlesimo	3,430	22.61
Jim Bennett	2,861	18.86
Graham Wilson	1,274	8.40
Lawrence Holland	1,144	7.54
Frank DiPierdomenico	714	4.71
Kevin Flood	373	2.46
Bob Harper	336	2.22
Bowen Alkemade	128	0.84
Total votes	15,168	100.00

Results provided by the City of Windsor.

1997 Windsor municipal election: Ward 2 (two members elected)
Candidate	Votes	%
Brian Masse	3,425	26.20
(x) Peter Carlesimo	2,865	21.91
Jim Bennett	2,491	19.05
Rolly Marentette	1,613	12.34
George Dadamo	1,587	12.14
Gail Zdyb	597	4.57
Robert Potomski	496	3.79
Total votes	13,074	100.00

Results are provided by the City of Windsor.

Electors could vote for two candidates in the municipal elections. The percentages are determined in relation to the total number of votes.

All federal election information is taken from Elections Canada. Italicized expenditures refer to submitted totals, and are presented when the final reviewed totals are not available.

Preceded by Sheila Wisdom and Peter Carlesimo	Windsor City Councillor, Ward Two (with Peter Carlesimo); 1997–2002	Succeeded by Peter Carlesimo and Ron Jones
