= Harb Gill =

Canadian politician

Harb Gill MP
- Gill in 2026

Member of Parliament for Windsor West
- Incumbent
- Assumed office April 28, 2025
- Preceded by: Brian Masse

Personal details
- Born: Gujarat, India
- Party: Conservative
- Website: www.harbgill.com
- Police career
- Department: Toronto Police Service; LaSalle Police Service
- Service years: 1995－2024
- Status: Retired
- Rank: Senior constable

Harbinder Gill MP is a Canadian politician from the Conservative Party of Canada. He was elected Member of Parliament for Windsor West in the 2025 Canadian federal election. Gill unseated long-time NDP incumbent Brian Masse. He is a retired police officer.

== Electoral record ==
2025 Canadian federal election: Windsor West
Party	Candidate	Votes	%	±%	Expenditures
Conservative	Harb Gill	21,412	39.01	+19.67	
Liberal	Richard Pollock	16,986	30.95	+3.18	
New Democratic	Brian Masse	15,256	27.79	−16.45	
People's	Jacob Bezaire	553	1.01	−7.33	
Green	Louay Ahmad	397	0.72	N/A	
Communist	Joseph Markham	195	0.36	N/A	
Marxist–Leninist	Margaret Villamizar	89	0.16	−0.15	
Total valid votes/expense limit		54,888	99.19		
Total rejected ballots		446	0.81		
Turnout		55,334	58.60		
Eligible voters		94,427			
Conservative notional gain from New Democratic		Swing		+8.25	
Source: Elections Canada
Note: number of eligible voters does not include voting day registrations.
