= 2000 Windsor municipal election =

Municipal election in Windsor, Ontario

The 2000 Windsor municipal election was held in the City of Windsor, Ontario to elect a mayor, councillors and school trustees.

== Results ==
2000 Windsor municipal election: Council, Ward Two (two members elected)
| Candidate | Votes | % |
|---|---|---|
| (x)Brian Masse | 4,908 | 32.36 |
| (x)Peter Carlesimo | 3,430 | 22.61 |
| Jim Bennett | 2,861 | 18.86 |
| Graham Wilson | 1,274 | 8.40 |
| Lawrence Holland | 1,144 | 7.54 |
| Frank DiPierdomenico | 714 | 4.71 |
| Kevin Flood | 373 | 2.46 |
| Bob Harper | 336 | 2.22 |
| Bowen Alkemade | 128 | 0.84 |
| Total votes | 15,168 | 100.00 |

- Graham Wilson was a thirty-year-old machinist at the time of the election. He was previously elected to the Greater Essex County District School Board in 1997. In early 2000, Wilson and other board members took part in a protest against demands by provincial Education Minister Janet Ecker that the board implement austerity measures to balance its budget.
- Lawrence Holland was a fringe candidate for mayor in 1991. A 23-year-old journalism student at St. Clair College, he called for Windsor-area garbage to be sent to the Detroit incinerator. After the election, he became co-owner of La Creperie Cafe and Restaurant. Holland campaigned for a council seat in Windsor's third ward in 1994, but dropped out before the election. In the 2000 campaign, he described himself as a waiter and online antique marketer. He campaigned for Ward 2 again in 2003, supporting the Detroit River Tunnel Partnership proposal. He was again defeated.
- Frank DiPierdomenico has a Bachelor of Arts degree in Psychology, and is best known a blind athlete. He was diagnosed as having a degenerative retina at age thirteen, and lost most of his sight by his mid-20s. He won a silver medal for the 400-metre dash at the 1986 World Games for the disabled, set a world record in the powerlifting category in 1989, and took a gold medal and the Canadian Disabled Games in Vancouver. He has also won gold at other events, including the 1990 United States Amateur Blind Athlete power-lifting championships, and the 1995 Ontario Winter Games. He was thirty-seven years old in 2000 and worked as a management consultant for Acclaim SBA Inc. His primary issue was community safety.
- Bob Harper was a fifty-three-year-old salesman in 2000. He is a right-wing political activist in Windsor, and regularly criticizes the city's spending plans. He opposed plans to amalgamate Windsor with neighbouring municipalities in 2000, arguing that the smaller communities would be forced to pay for questionable urban programs. Harper also called for increased privatization of services in the 2000 campaign. He later wrote against pornography, abortion, and same-sex marriage, and wrote several letters-to-the-editor against the Liberal Party in 2005. In 2006, he wrote in support of the Canadian military mission in Afghanistan, and against calls for an early ceasefire in the 2006 Israel-Lebanon conflict.
- Bowen Alkemade was a twenty-six-year-old stonemason.
