= 1988 Windsor municipal election =

The 1988 Windsor municipal election was held in the City of Windsor, Ontario to elect a mayor, councillors and school trustees.

== Results ==
=== Ward 1 ===
1988 Windsor municipal election: Council, Ward One (two members elected)
Candidate	Votes	%
(x)Mike Hurst	10,404	44.89
Dwight Duncan	5,976	25.79
Bob Girard	5,898	25.45
Gerald Johnson	897	3.87
Total Valid Votes	23,175	100.00

- Bob Girard was a veteran community and environmental activist in Windsor. He was a member of Surrounding Citizens Reacting Against Pollution (SCRAP) during the 1980s, and opposed the environmental practices of the Zalev Brothers scrapyard. He was also involved in a campaign to shut down CP Rail's illegal Powell Siding, and was a returning officer for Windsor—Walkerville in the 1987 and 1990 provincial elections. He managed a tree nursery in private life, and wrote occasional newspaper articles on horticultural matters. He ran for council in 1974 and 1988, and suggested that his 1988 loss was due to rival candidate Dwight Duncan's connections to the local Liberal Party organisation. Girard died on 19 September 1993 of an apparent heart attack while playing golf. He was fifty-five years old.
- Gerald Johnson did not provide biographical information to the Windsor Star newspaper. He was forbidden from participating in the 1991 election, after failing to file his expenses and income statements.

=== Ward 2 ===
Council Candidate	Vote	%
Peter Carlesimo	5,645	29.04
Sheila Wisdom	5,149	26.49
Mike Walsh	4,988	25.66
Robert Joseph Potomski	1,081	5.56
Greg Nassr	940	4.84
Jim Meunier	611	3.14
David Brownell	517	2.66
Larry St. Denis	507	2.61
