= 2014 Essex County municipal elections =

Local election in Ontario, Canada

Essex County, Ontario held its County Council election on October 27, 2014, in conjunction with municipal elections across the province.

== Essex County Council ==
Essex County Council consists of the 7 mainland mayors of Essex County and their seven deputy mayors. Pelee Island is considered a "separate township," and is not represented on County council but is included on this list.

Position	Elected
Amherstburg Mayor	Aldo DiCarlo
Amherstburg Deputy Mayor	Bart DiPasquale
Essex Mayor	Ron McDermott
Essex Deputy Mayor	(selected from council)
Kingsville Mayor	Nelson Santos
Kingsville Deputy Mayor	Gord Queen
Lakeshore Mayor	Tom Bain
Lakeshore Deputy Mayor	Big Al Fazio
LaSalle Mayor	Ken Antaya
LaSalle Deputy Mayor	Marc Bondy
Leamington Mayor	John David Paterson
Leamington Deputy Mayor	Hilda Macdonald (acclaimed)
Tecumseh Mayor	Gary McNamara
Tecumseh Deputy Mayor	Joe Bachetti

== Amherstburg ==
Mayoral Candidate	Vote	%
Aldo DiCarlo	4,023	52.74
Ron Sutherland	1,950	25.56
John Sutton	1,120	14.68
Marty Adler	535	7.01

== Essex ==
Mayoral Candidate	Vote	%
Ron McDermott (X)	2,619	33.36
Ron Rogers	2,392	30.47
Bill Baker	2,220	28.28
Andy Comber	619	7.89

== Kingsville ==
Mayoral Candidate	Vote	%
Nelson Santos (X)	5,902	84.71
Bernie Ladenthin	1,065	15.29

== Lakeshore ==
Mayoral Candidate	Vote	%
Tom Bain (X)	8,753	76.09
Rick Teno	2,751	23.91

== LaSalle ==
Mayoral Candidate	Vote	%
Ken Antaya (X)	6,834	68.20
Adrien Bezaire	3,187	31.80

== Leamington ==
Mayoral Candidate	Vote	%
John David Paterson (X)	5,273	74.28
Charlie Wright	1,826	25.72

== Tecumseh ==
Mayoral Candidate	Vote	%
Gary McNamara (X)	5,526	56.76
Cheryl Hardcastle	3,868	39.72
Antonello Di Millo	343	3.52

== Pelee (separated township) ==
Mayoral Candidate	Vote	%
Richard Masse (X)	Acclaimed	
