= Gerry Reid =

Canadian politician (born 1954)

Leader of the Opposition in Newfoundland and Labrador
- In office May 30, 2005 – November 13, 2007
- Preceded by: Roger Grimes
- Succeeded by: Yvonne Jones

Leader of the Newfoundland and Labrador Liberal Party
- In office May 29, 2006 – November 13, 2007
- Preceded by: Jim Bennett
- Succeeded by: Yvonne Jones
- In office May 30, 2005 – February 6, 2006; Acting
- Preceded by: Roger Grimes
- Succeeded by: Jim Bennett

Member of the Newfoundland and Labrador House of Assembly for The Isles of Notre Dame
- In office February 22, 1996 – October 9, 2007
- Preceded by: Riding established
- Succeeded by: Derrick Dalley

Personal details
- Born: June 18, 1954 (age 72) Carbonear, Newfoundland and Labrador, Canada
- Party: Liberal
- Children: Matthew & Lucas
- Education: Memorial University of Newfoundland
- Occupation: Teacher
- Cabinet: Government Whip Minister of Fisheries And Aquaculture (2001-2003); Minister of Education (2003)

Gerry Reid (born June 18, 1954) was a Canadian politician and the leader of the Liberal Party of Newfoundland and Labrador. He served as interim leader from 2005 to 2006, until Jim Bennett replaced him in February 2006. Reid was reelected as leader of the party on May 29, 2006, after Bennett resigned due to differences with the Liberal Party caucus.

Prior to entering politics, Reid was a teacher and town councillor in Summerford. Reid represented the district of The Isles of Notre Dame in the House of Assembly from 1996 until his 2007 defeat.

On October 9, 2007, in the general election, he led the party to its worst showing in the province's history with just 3 out of 48 potential seats. Reid was also defeated in his own riding by Progressive Conservative candidate Derrick Dalley, by a margin of twelve votes. Reid announced his departure from politics and resignation as party leader on November 13, 2007. He was subsequently replaced by MHA Yvonne Jones as interim leader.
