= John Millson (Canadian politician) =

Canadian politician and businessman

31st Mayor of Windsor
- In office 1988–1991
- Preceded by: David Burr
- Succeeded by: Mike Hurst

Personal details
- Born: 1951 or 1952 (age 73–74)

John Millson is a Canadian politician and businessman. He served as mayor of Windsor, Ontario, from 1988 to 1991, later becoming president of the Windsor Raceway. In 2009 he co-founded Great Lakes Energy Limited.

== Biography ==
Millson attended J.L. Forster Secondary School, where he joined the school band. He later recalled that the band teacher, Ernie Gerenda, had given him and the other band members tough love, at times being a bully, and at times playing practical jokes. Millson later attended the University of Windsor.

Millson ran successfully for alderman of Windsor's Ward 2 in 1982. In 1985, he topped the polls in two-seat Ward 2, finishing 2,764 votes ahead of incumbent Ted Bounsall, who was also elected. Millson was elected as mayor of Windsor in 1988 with a total of 31,303 votes, taking office in November. He did not run for reelection in 1991 in order to spend more time with his family.

Millson later worked as president of Windsor Raceway, earning CAD 300,000 per annum in 1998. He stepped down in 2006.

Millson teamed up with president of Southwestern Manufacturing Vince Schiller and VP Mike Mitchell to found Great Lakes Energy, which builds and owns solar installations across Ontario, in 2009. He is currently its president. He was suggested as a candidate for the 2010 election, but said he was too busy.

In 2011, Millson was suggested as a possible replacement for Windsor West Member of Provincial Parliament Sandra Pupatello. Although Millson did not confirm that he would be running, he said he was "flattered" that people thought he would be a good candidate. It has been rumoured that Pupatello would be backing him.

On September 4, 2014, Millson announced he would be a candidate for Mayor of Windsor in the municipal election held on October 27, 2014. He lost to Drew Dilkens.

== Bibliography ==
- Cross, Brian (11 June 2011). "The race to replace Pupatello is on". Windsor Star.
- "Millson says he caved in to 'big boys'". Windsor Star. 2 November 2006. Archived from the original on 10 November 2012.
- Shaw, Ted (30 April 2011). "Redcoats: Time of their lives: Forster band travelled the world". Windsor Star.
- Shoalts, David (13 November 1991). "McCallion an easy winner again". Globe and Mail. p. A7.
- "Election results". City of Windsor. Archived from the original on 13 December 2010.
- "John Millson". WE Tech Alliance.
- Vander Doelen, Chris (14 June 2011). "Windsor West race is on". Windsor Star.
- van Wageningen, Ellen (14 June 2010). "Leap of faith in purchasing equipment will soon pay off". Windsor Star. Archived from the original on 13 September 2012.
- Cross, Brian (22 April 2010). "Question mark hangs over mayor's race". Windsor Star. Archived from the original on 13 September 2012.
- "More damages granted to Doug Lawson". Windsor Star. 19 December 2007. Archived from the original on 10 November 2012.
