= George Dadamo =

Canadian politician

Ontario MPP
- In office 1990–1995
- Preceded by: Bill Wrye
- Succeeded by: Sandra Pupatello
- Constituency: Windsor—Sandwich

Personal details
- Born: November 3, 1953 (age 72) Windsor, Ontario
- Party: New Democrat
- Occupation: Radio Broadcaster

George Dadamo (born November 3, 1953) is a former Canadian politician. He served as a New Democratic member of the Legislative Assembly of Ontario from 1990 to 1995 representing the southwestern provincial riding of Windsor—Sandwich.

== Background ==
Dadamo worked in radio as a broadcaster for CKLW/CKWW in Windsor, CKCK in Regina, Saskatchewan and CHNL in Kamloops, British Columbia between 1973 and 1989. He lives in Abbotsford, British Columbia.

== Politics ==
=== Ontario ===
Dadamo ran for the Ontario legislature in the 1987 provincial election, finishing second to incumbent Liberal Bill Wrye in the riding of Windsor—Sandwich by 2,459 votes. The NDP won a majority government in the 1990 provincial election, and Dadamo defeated Wrye by 4,145 votes in a rematch from 1987. He served as parliamentary assistant to both the Minister of Transportation and to the Minister of Culture and Communications.

During his time in office, Dadamo sponsored three private member's bills; the first sought to give workers up to one year's notice of an impending factory shutdown, the second was for a property tax exemption on a new arena being built in Windsor, and the third would have restricted vendors from sidewalks in Windsor. In 1994 Dadamo was appointed as chair of a task force called the Transit Integration Task Force. It studied how to implement 'seamless transit' across the GTA. It proposed a weekly pass for $30 that could be used anywhere in the region. He said, "We're talking about making borders disappear for people who use transit."

Dadamo did not seek re-election in the 1995 provincial election.

In 1997, he ran for Windsor City Council in Ward 2 (West Windsor) but was unsuccessful.

=== Alberta ===
Dadamo later moved to Alberta, where he sold used cars. In 2009, he ran for mayor of Calgary but dropped out upon learning that he had hired an assistant who had been accused of murder. This information was reported in the media and reflected badly on his campaign. He also considered seeking a nomination as the Liberal candidate in a provincial by-election in the riding of Calgary-Glenmore but later backed out.
