= 1991 Windsor municipal election =

Election in Ontario, Canada

The 1991 Windsor municipal election was held in the City of Windsor, Ontario, Canada on November 12, 1991, to elect a mayor, ten councillors, utility commissioners and school trustees.

== Results ==
=== Mayor ===
1991 Windsor municipal election: Mayor
Candidate	Votes	%
Mike Hurst	38,154	64.95
Jerry Woloschuk	17,759	30.23
Tony Di Millo	654	1.11
Lawrence Holland	480	0.82
Jason Bechard	445	0.76
Joe Crouchman	445	0.76
Paul Sood	308	0.52
Ronald Harrison	268	0.46
Emery Szekely	235	0.40
Total Valid Votes	58,748	100.00

=== Council ===
1991 Windsor municipal election: Council, Ward One (two members elected)
Candidate	Votes	%
(x)Dwight Duncan	8,438	36.95
Margaret Williams	6,288	27.54
Al Santing	3,285	14.39
Karen Bennett	1,905	8.34
Rick Cian	1,905	8.34
Joseph Theriault	1,014	4.44
Total Valid Votes	22,835	100.00

- Karen Bennett was a civil engineer technologist, and served as chair of the Court of Revisions - Local Improvements in the 1990s. The 1991 election was her first campaign. She campaigned again in the 1994 municipal election under the name "Karen Spencer-Gibbs", calling for property tax reform and infrastructural upgrades.
- Rick P. Cian holds Bachelor of Commerce and Master of Business Administration degrees from the University of Windsor. He was thirty years old in 1991, and worked as a pension analyst for Chrysler Canada Ltd. He called for a reduction in welfare rolls, and argued that city government should be run as a business.
- Joseph Theriault was a contract administrator for Tri-Way Machine Ltd., and was active in a Brighton Beach ratepayers organization. He was thirty-five years old in 1991.

1991 Windsor municipal election: Council, Ward Two (two members elected)
Candidate	Votes	%
(x)Sheila Wisdom	6,379	39.74
(x)Peter Carlesimo	4,852	30.23
Arlene Rousseau	2,300	14.33
Paul Dale	831	5.18
George J. Mahler	629	3.92
Gilles Brunet	554	3.45
Kevin Cathcart	506	3.15
Total Valid Votes	16,051	100.00

1991 Windsor municipal election: Council, Ward Three (two members elected)
Candidate	Votes	%
(x)Donna Gamble	6,406	31.55
(x)Tom Porter	6,344	31.24
Jim McKenzie	3,422	16.85
Lyle J. Browning	1,223	6.02
Margaret A. Faulkner	842	4.15
Kirk Scott	665	3.28
Cal Maniscalco	563	2.77
Rick Pane	499	2.46
Ernie Lamont	341	1.68
Total Valid Votes	20,305	100.00

1991 Windsor municipal election: Council, Ward Four (two members elected)
Candidate	Votes	%
(x)David Cassivi	6,716	36.12
(x)Tom Toth	5,038	27.09
Fred Alexander	4,463	24.00
Helen Bechard	1,411	7.59
Roy Oney	967	5.20
Total Valid Votes	18,595	100.00

1991 Windsor municipal election: Council, Ward Five (two members elected)
Candidate	Votes	%
(x)Rick Limoges	9,439	39.27
(x)Tom Wilson	6,493	27.01
Douglas Friend	3,262	13.57
Ann Iliganic	3,250	13.52
Frank Batal	1,192	4.96
Duncan Boutilier	402	1.67
Total Valid Votes	24,038	100.00

Electors in each ward could vote for two candidates for council. Percentages refer to the total number of votes.

Source: Windsor Star newspaper, 13 November 1991.
