= Seventh Ward =

Seventh Ward may refer to:

- 7th Ward of New Orleans, a ward of New Orleans
- Seventh Ward, New Orleans, a neighborhood of New Orleans
- Ward 7 of the District of Columbia, a ward of Washington, D.C.
- 7th ward, Chicago, an aldermanic ward of Chicago
- Ward 7, St. Louis City, an aldermanic ward of St. Louis
- Ward 7, the name of several wards of Zimbabwe
- Ward 7 (Markham, Ontario)
- Bay Ward, Ottawa (also known as Ward 7)
- Ward 7 Humber River—Black Creek, Toronto
- Ward 7 (Windsor, Ontario)
- Ward 7, novel by Ukrainian author Valery Tarsis
