= Windsor City Council =

Governing body of Windsor, Ontario, Canada

Type
- Type: City Council

History
- Founded: April 14, 1892
- New session started: November 15, 2022

Leadership
- Mayor of Windsor: Drew Dilkens since October 27, 2014

Structure
- Seats: 10 plus Mayor
- Length of term: 4 years
- Authority: City of Windsor Incorporation Act, 1892
- Salary: $194,280 (Mayor) $45,748 (Councillor)

Elections
- Last election: October 24, 2022
- Next election: 2026

Meeting place
- Council Chambers; Windsor City Hall; Windsor, Ontario

Website
- www.citywindsor.ca/mayorandcouncil/Pages/Mayor-and-City-Council.aspx

Windsor City Council is the governing body of Windsor, Ontario, Canada.

The council consists of the mayor plus ten elected city councillors (one per ward) representing the city as a whole.

== 2006–2010 ==
Council elected in the 2006 election:

Councillor	Ward	Notes
Eddie Francis	Mayor	
Dave Brister	Ward 1	
Drew Dilkens	Ward 1	
Ron Jones	Ward 2	
Caroline Postma	Ward 2	
Fulvio Valentinis	Ward 3	
Alan Halberstadt	Ward 3	
Bill Marra	Ward 4	
Ken Lewenza, Jr.	Ward 4	
Jo-Anne Gignac	Ward 5	
Percy Hatfield	Ward 5	

== 2010–2014 ==
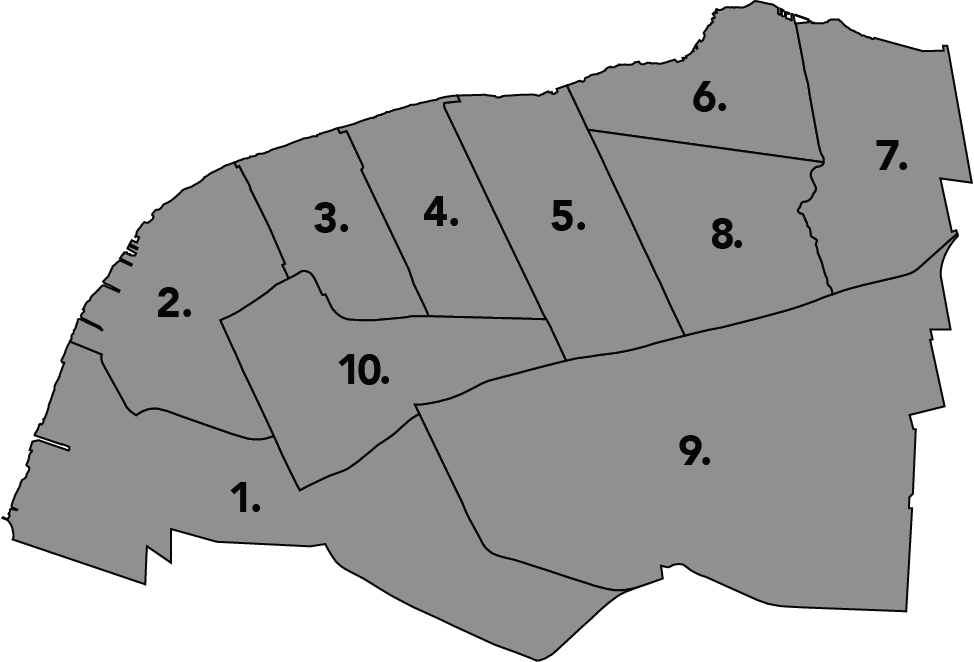
Windsor's 10 wards, in place since the 2010 election.

Council elected in the 2010 election:

Councillor	Ward	Notes
Eddie Francis	Mayor	
Drew Dilkens	Ward 1	
Ron Jones	Ward 2	
Fulvio Valentinis	Ward 3	
Alan Halberstadt	Ward 4	
Ed Sleiman	Ward 5	
Jo-Anne Gignac	Ward 6	
Percy Hatfield (2010–2013); Irek Kusmierczyk (2013–2014)	Ward 7	
Bill Marra	Ward 8	
Hilary Payne	Ward 9	
Al Magnieh	Ward 10	

== 2014–2018 ==
Councillor	Ward	Communities
Drew Dilkens	Mayor	At-large
Fred Francis	Ward 1	Brighton Beach, South Windsor
John Elliott	Ward 2	Sandwich, Bridgeview, Sutherland
Rino Bortolin	Ward 3	City Centre
Chris Holt	Ward 4	Walkerville, Via Italia, Wyandotte Town Centre
Ed Sleiman	Ward 5	Ford City
Jo-Anne Gignac	Ward 6	Riverside
Irek Kusmierczyk	Ward 7	Forest Glade, East Riverside
Bill Marra	Ward 8	East Windsor
Hilary Payne	Ward 9	Devonshire Heights, Roseland, Fontainebleau
Paul Borrelli	Ward 10	Remington Park

== 2018–2022 ==
Council elected in the 2018 election:

Councillor	Ward	Communities
Drew Dilkens	Mayor	At-large
Fred Francis	Ward 1	Brighton Beach, South Windsor
Fabio Costante	Ward 2	Sandwich, Bridgeview, Sutherland
Rino Bortolin	Ward 3	City Centre
Chris Holt	Ward 4	Walkerville, Via Italia, Wyandotte Town Centre
Ed Sleiman	Ward 5	Ford City
Jo-Anne Gignac	Ward 6	Riverside
Irek Kusmierczyk (2018–2019)	Ward 7	Forest Glade, East Riverside
Vacant (2019–2020)	Ward 7	Forest Glade, East Riverside
Jeewen Gill (2020–2022)	Ward 7	Forest Glade, East Riverside
Gary Kaschak	Ward 8	East Windsor
Kieran McKenzie	Ward 9	Devonshire Heights, Roseland, Fontainebleau
Jim Morrison	Ward 10	Remington Park

== 2022–2026 ==
Council elected in the 2022 election:

Councillor	Ward	Communities
Drew Dilkens	Mayor	At-large
Fred Francis	Ward 1	Brighton Beach, South Windsor
Fabio Costante (2022–2025)	Ward 2	Sandwich, Bridgeview, Sutherland
Frazier Fathers (2025–Present)	Ward 2	Sandwich, Bridgeview, Sutherland
Renaldo Agostino	Ward 3	City Centre
Mark McKenzie	Ward 4	Walkerville, Via Italia, Wyandotte Town Centre
Ed Sleiman	Ward 5	Ford City
Jo-Anne Gignac	Ward 6	Riverside
Angelo Marignani	Ward 7	Forest Glade, East Riverside
Gary Kaschak	Ward 8	East Windsor
Kieran McKenzie	Ward 9	Devonshire Heights, Roseland, Fontainebleau
Jim Morrison	Ward 10	Remington Park
