= 2022 Essex County municipal elections =

Local election in Ontario, Canada

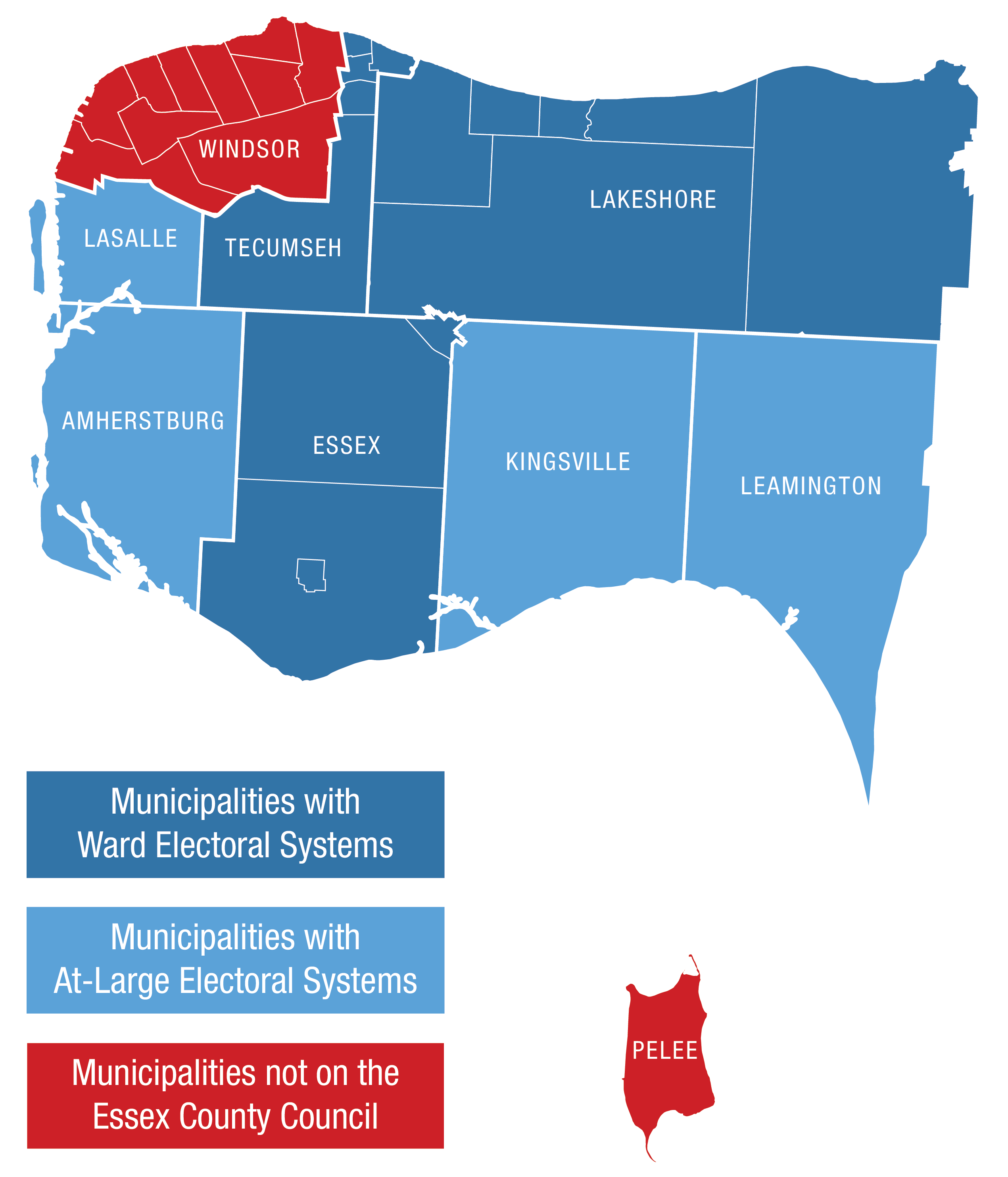
Map of Essex County showing the municipalities that use a Ward system for their Town Councils in Dark Blue, and an At-Large system (with the top 5 placed candidates elected) in Light Blue. Red is the City of Windsor and Pelee Township which are both nominally part of Essex County, but are considered separate municipalities, and do not send members to the Essex County Council.

Municipal elections were held in Essex County in Ontario on October 24, 2022, in conjunction with municipal elections across the province.

This page only includes the results for the towns of Essex County, and Pelee. While the City of Windsor (the largest population centre in the county by far) is nominally part of the county and counted in its population numbers, the city and its municipal government are a separate entity, and do not send any members to the County Council. The elections to Windsor's Mayor and City Council were held concurrently.

(NOTE: Elected candidates are shown in bold. An (X) indicates an incumbent candidate.)

== Essex County Council ==
Essex County Council consists of the 7 mainland mayors of Essex County and their seven deputy mayors.

Position	Elected
Amherstburg Mayor	Michael Prue
Amherstburg Deputy Mayor	Chris Gibb
Essex Mayor	Sherry Bondy
Essex Deputy Mayor	Rob Shepley
Kingsville Mayor	Dennis Rogers
Kingsville Deputy Mayor	Kimberly DeYong
Lakeshore Mayor	Tracey Bailey
Lakeshore Deputy Mayor	Kirk Walstedt
LaSalle Mayor	Crystal Meloche
LaSalle Deputy Mayor	Michael Akpata
Leamington Mayor	Hilda Macdonald
Leamington Deputy Mayor	Larry Verbeke
Tecumseh Mayor	Gary McNamara
Tecumseh Deputy Mayor	Joe Bachetti

== Amherstburg ==
The following are the results for Mayor, Deputy Mayor, & the Municipal Council of Amherstburg.

=== Mayor ===
Mayor Aldo DiCarlo did not run for re-election.

Candidate	Popular vote		
Candidate	Votes	%	±%
**Michael Prue**	**3,488**	**48.93**	--
Bob Rozankovic	1,530	21.46	--
Frank Cerasa	1,073	15.05	--
John Laframboise	1,038	14.56	--
**Total valid votes**	7,129	97.14	
**Total rejected, unmarked and declined votes**	210	2.86	
**Turnout**	7,339	39.34	-3.39
**Eligible voters**	18,653		
Note: Candidate campaign colours are based on the prominent colour used in campaign items (signs, literature, etc.) and are used as a visual differentiation between candidates. Colours from prior party affiliations may be used as well.

=== Deputy Mayor ===
Candidate	Popular vote		
Candidate	Votes	%	±%
**Chris Gibb**	**2,766**	**39.00**	--
Nancy Atkinson	1,706	24.05	--
Joe Shaw	1,110	15.65	--
Dennis Sanson	841	11.86	--
Gregory Moore	670	9.45	--
**Total valid votes**	-	-	
**Total rejected, unmarked and declined votes**	-	-	
**Turnout**	-	-	--
**Eligible voters**	-		
Note: Candidate campaign colours are based on the prominent colour used in campaign items (signs, literature, etc.) and are used as a visual differentiation between candidates. Colours from prior party affiliations may be used as well.

=== Amherstburg Municipal Council ===
The following candidates ran for the Amherstburg Municipal Council. All candidates run on a town-wide constituency, and the top 5 placed candidates are elected.

Candidate (Elect 5)	Popular vote		
Candidate (Elect 5)	Votes	%	±%
**Linden Crain**	**3,795**	**12.74**	--
**Donald McArthur** (X)	**3,091**	**10.38**	-1.13
**Molly Allaire**	**2,858**	**9.60**	--
**Peter Courtney** (X)	**2,743**	**9.21**	+1.33
**Diane Pouget**	**2,624**	**8.81**	--
Lori Wightman	2,180	7.32	-0.03
Gerry Theriault	2,116	7.10	--
Patricia Simone (X)	2,114	7.10	-2.63
Bill Fryer	1,579	5.30	--
Lawrence Amlin	1,489	5.00	--
Frank Di Pasquale	1,465	4.92	--
Marc Renaud (X)	1,253	4.21	-3.25
Tara Kearsey	996	3.34	--
Holger Kretschmann	682	2.29	--
Andrew Argoselo	444	1.49	--
Lucas Anderson	356	1.20	--
**Total valid votes**	-	-	
**Total rejected, unmarked and declined votes**	-	-	
**Turnout**	-	-	--
**Eligible voters**	-		
Note: Candidate campaign colours are based on the prominent colour used in campaign items (signs, literature, etc.) and are used as a visual differentiation between candidates. Colours from prior party affiliations may be used as well.

== Essex ==
The following are the results for Mayor, Deputy Mayor, & the Municipal Council of Essex

=== Mayor ===
Candidate	Popular vote		
Candidate	Votes	%	±%
**Sherry Bondy**	**3,794**	**54.16**	--
Richard Meloche (X)	3,211	45.84	--
**Total valid votes**	7,005	99.62	
**Total rejected, unmarked and declined votes**	27	0.38	
**Turnout**	7,032	41.10	-3.90
**Eligible voters**	17,111		
Note: Candidate campaign colours are based on the prominent colour used in campaign items (signs, literature, etc.) and are used as a visual differentiation between candidates. Colours from prior party affiliations may be used as well.

=== Deputy Mayor ===
The following were the results for deputy mayor of Essex.

Candidate	Popular vote		
Candidate	Votes	%	±%
**Rob Shepley**	**3,581**	**52.83**	--
Ron Rogers	3,197	47.17	--
**Total valid votes**	6,778	-	
**Total rejected, unmarked and declined votes**	-	-	
**Turnout**	7,032	41.10	-3.90
**Eligible voters**	17,111		
Note: Candidate campaign colours are based on the prominent colour used in campaign items (signs, literature, etc.) and are used as a visual differentiation between candidates. Colours from prior party affiliations may be used as well.

=== Essex Municipal Council ===
The following candidates ran for the Essex Municipal Council. Elections in Wards 1 and 3 elect the top two placed candidates, and Wards 2 and 4 elect only the first place candidate.

Candidate	Vote	%
Ward 1 (elect 2)
**Joe Garon (X)**	**1,282**	**32.99**
**Katie McGuire-Blais**	**1,186**	**30.52**
Morley Bowman (X)	771	19.84
Glen Mills	647	16.65
Ward 2 (elect 1)
**Kim Verbeek (X)**	**Acclaimed**	
Ward 3 (elect 2)
**Brad Allard**	**1,063**	**35.52**
**Jason Matyi**	**1,038**	**34.68**
Chris Vander Doelen (X)	892	29.80
Ward 4 (elect 1)
**Rodney Hammond**	**626**	**56.86**
Shawn Mulder	475	43.14

== Kingsville ==
The following are the results for Mayor, Deputy Mayor, & the Municipal Council of Kingsville.

=== Mayor ===
Mayor Nelson Santos stepped down as mayor on July 17 to take a job outside the region, and therefore did not run for re-election. Deputy mayor Gord Queen served as acting mayor in the interim.

Candidate	Popular vote		
Candidate	Votes	%	±%
**Dennis Rogers**	**3,182**	**37.98**	--
Tamara Stomp	3,036	36.23	--
Laura Lucier	2,161	25.79	--
**Total valid votes**	-	—	
**Total rejected, unmarked and declined votes**	51	--	
**Turnout**	8,510	50.19	+3.40
**Eligible voters**	16,955		
Note: Candidate campaign colours are based on the prominent colour used in campaign items (signs, literature, etc.) and are used as a visual differentiation between candidates. Colours from prior party affiliations may be used as well.

=== Deputy Mayor ===
Deputy mayoral candidate	Vote	%
**Kimberly DeYong**	**4,629**	**55.82**
Gord Queen (X)	3,130	37.75
Samson Zad	533	6.43

=== Kingsville Municipal Council ===
The following candidates ran for the Kingsville Municipal Council. All candidates run on a town-wide constituency, and the top 5 placed candidates are elected.

Candidate	Vote	%
**Tony Gaffan (X)**	**5,285**	**14.57**
**Larry Patterson (X)**	**4,409**	**12.15**
**Thomas Neufeld (X)**	**4,188**	**11.54**
**Debby Jarvis-Chausse**	**3,443**	**9.49**
**Sheri Lowrie**	**3,316**	**9.14**
Barry Wilson	3,231	8.90
Michael Del Ciancio	2,568	7.08
Tim Seech	1,903	5.24
Michael Glass	1,728	4.76
Willy Fittler	1,673	4.61
Brandon Stanley	1,429	3.94
Les McDonald	1,326	3.65
Scott Collier	1,028	2.83
Gideon Spevak	756	2.08

== Lakeshore ==
The following are the results for Mayor, Deputy Mayor, & the Municipal Council of Lakeshore.

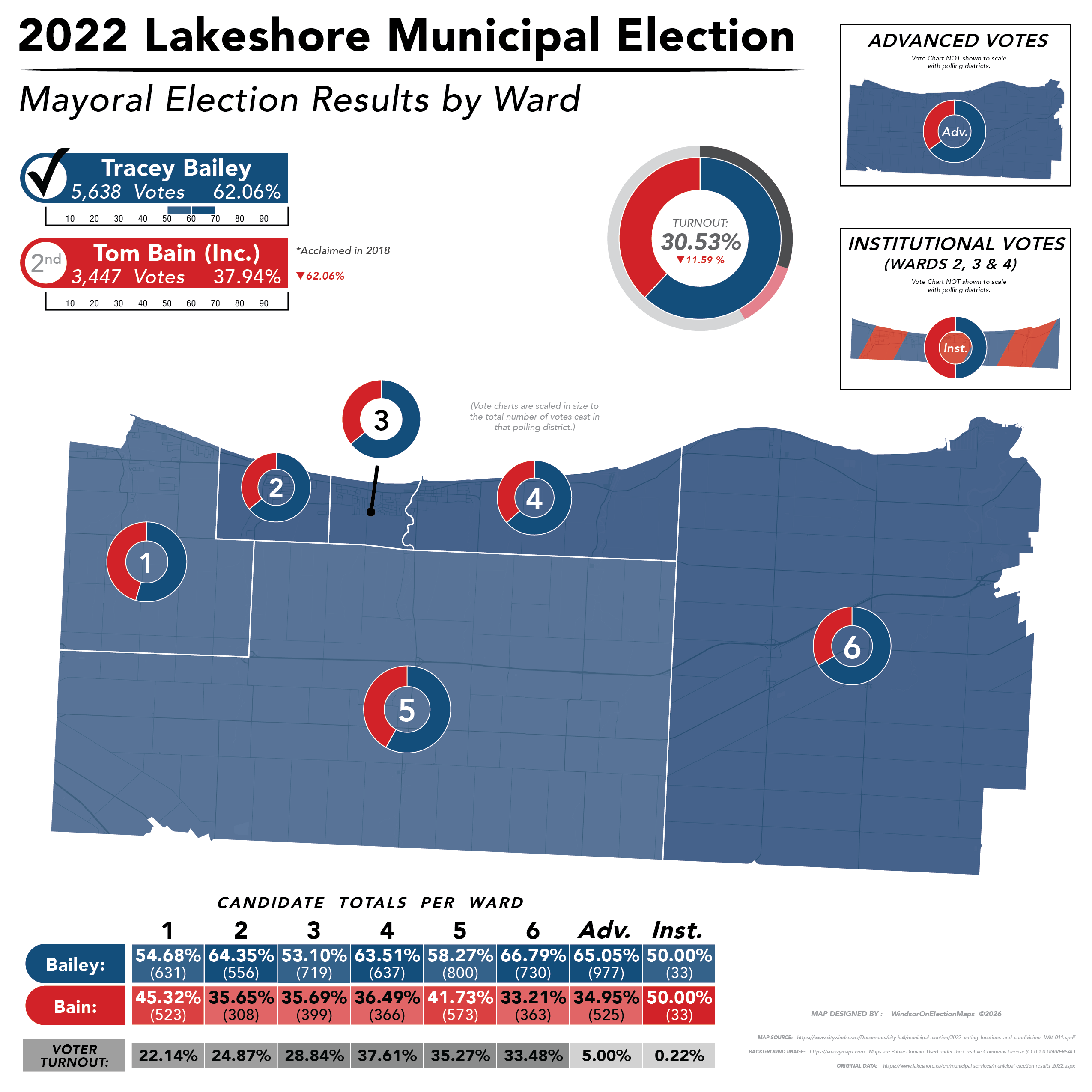
Results of the 2022 Lakeshore Mayoral Election, showing which candidate had the majority of the vote in the town's 6 wards. Pie charts indicate the vote of all candidates.

=== Mayor ===
Incumbent mayor Tom Bain lost to deputy mayor Tracey Bailey.

Mayoral Candidate	Vote	%
**Tracey Bailey**	**5,638**	**62.06**
Tom Bain (X)	3,447	37.94

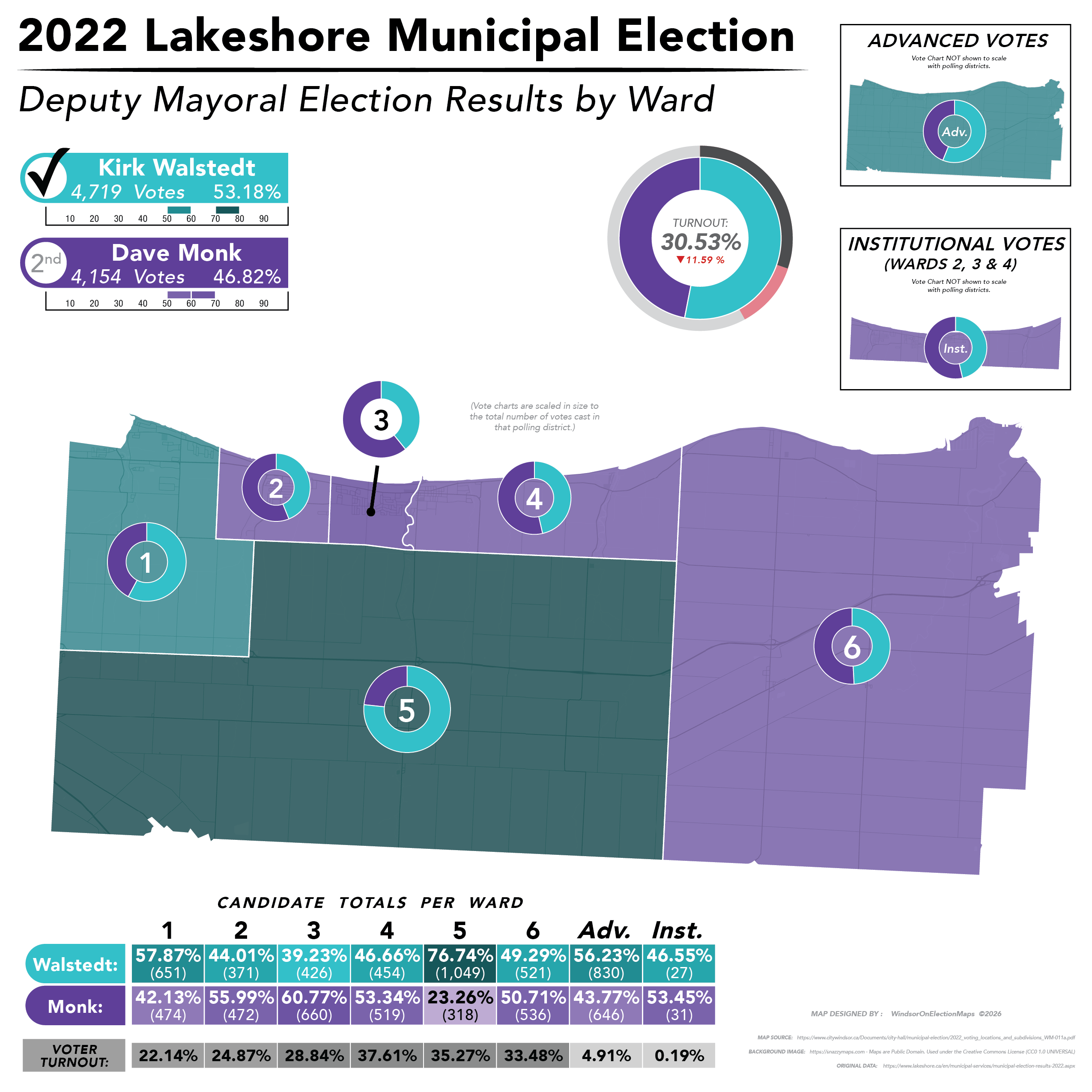
Results of the 2022 Lakeshore Deputy Mayoral Election, showing which candidate had the majority of the vote in the town's 6 wards. Pie charts indicate the vote of all candidates.

=== Deputy Mayor ===
Deputy Mayoral Candidate	Vote	%
**Kirk Walstedt**	**4,719**	**53.18**
Dave Monk	4,154	46.82

=== Lakeshore Municipal Council ===
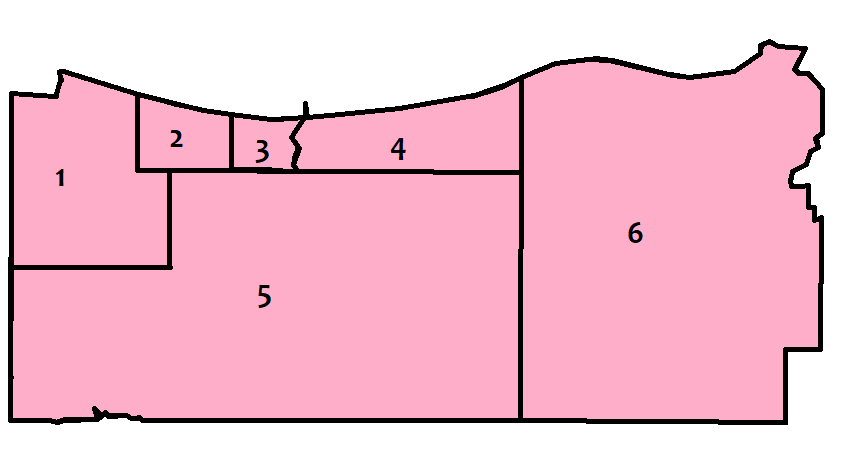
Map of Lakeshore's six wards

Candidate	Vote	%
Ward 1
**Ryan McNamara**	**974**	**76.57**
Nick Panasiuk	298	23.43
Ward 2
**Paddy Byrne**	**605**	**56.38**
Michael Hoffman	468	43.62
Ward 3
**Kelsey Santarossa** **(X)**	**837**	**60.92**
Giovanni Butera	483	35.15
Mohamed Seddik	54	3.93
Ward 4
**John Kerr** **(X)**	**1,327**	**61.92**
Jennifer Alderson	628	29.30
Sarah Aubin	188	8.77
Ward 5
**Ian Ruston**	**656**	**40.62**
Tim McDermott	647	40.06
Steve Anhorn	312	19.32
Ward 6
**Larissa Vogler**	**1,084**	**76.72**
David Cecile	178	12.60
David Larue	151	10.69

== LaSalle ==
The following are the results for Mayor, Deputy Mayor, & the Municipal Council of LaSalle.

=== Mayor ===
Incumbent mayor Marc Bondy did not run for re-election. Crystal Meloche was elected as mayor of LaSalle by acclamation. This led to a rare situation where both the Mayor and the Deputy Mayor positions were open seats, but both ended up being acclaimed.

This also made Crystal the first female Mayor of LaSalle in the town's history.

Candidate	Popular vote		
Candidate	Votes	%	±%
**Crystal Meloche**	**Acclaimed**	--	--
Note: Candidate campaign colours are based on the prominent colour used in campaign items (signs, literature, etc.) and are used as a visual differentiation between candidates. Colours from prior party affiliations may be used as well.

=== Deputy Mayor ===
Incumbent Deputy Mayor Crystal Meloche ran for Mayor, leaving this seat open as well. Michael Akpata was the only candidate to put their name forward, and was elected Deputy Mayor by acclamation.

Candidate	Popular vote		
Candidate	Votes	%	±%
**Mike Akpata**	**Acclaimed**	--	--
Note: Candidate campaign colours are based on the prominent colour used in campaign items (signs, literature, etc.) and are used as a visual differentiation between candidates. Colours from prior party affiliations may be used as well.

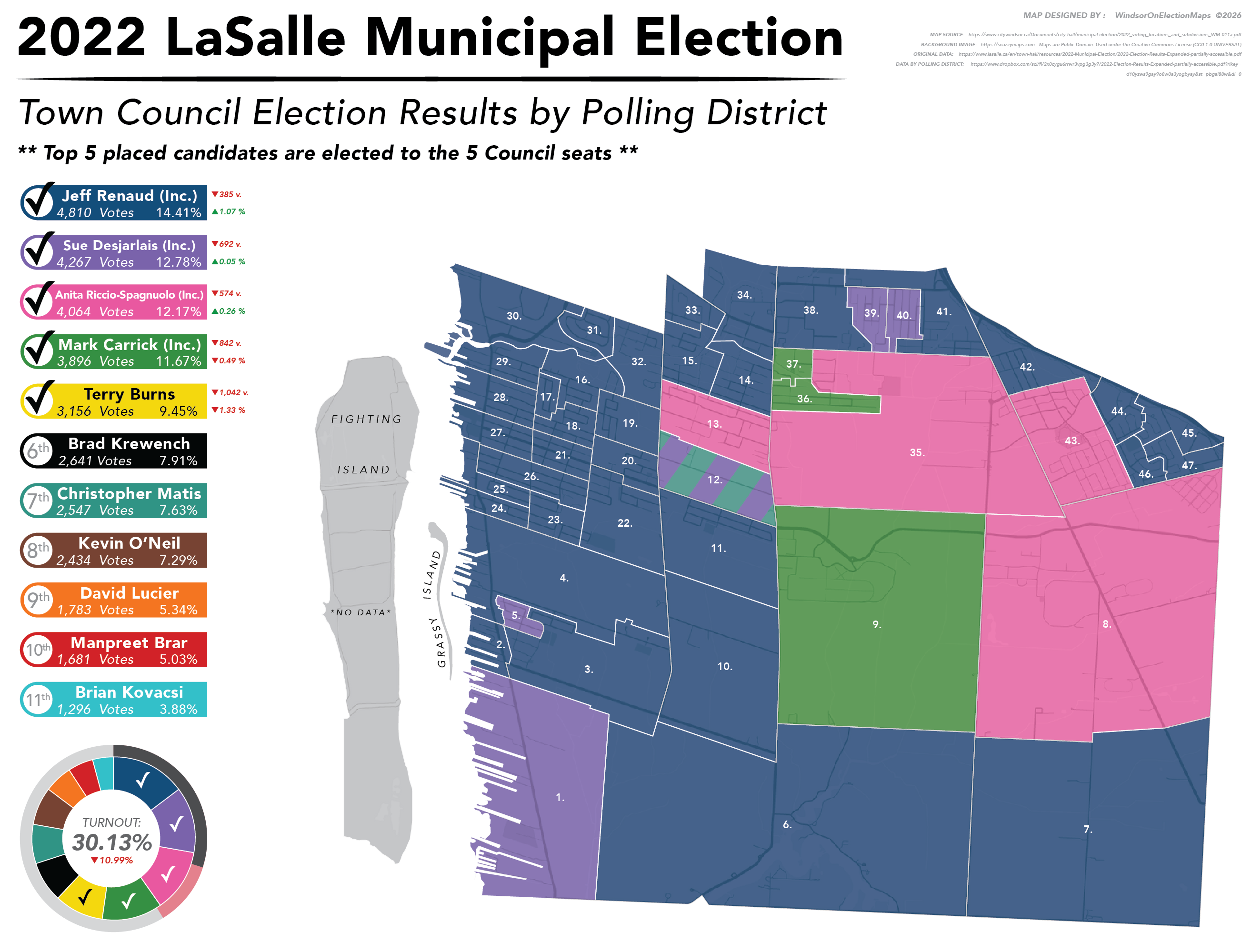
Results of the 2022 LaSalle Town Council election by polling district. Each district is coloured according to the candidate which received the plurality of the vote.

=== LaSalle Municipal Council ===
The following candidates ran for the Town Council of LaSalle. All candidates run on a town-wide constituency, and the top 5 placed candidates are elected.

Candidate (Elect 5)	Popular vote		
Candidate (Elect 5)	Votes	%	±%
**Jeff Renaud** (X)	**4,810**	**14.41**	+1.07
**Sue Desjarlais** (X)	**4,267**	**12.78**	+0.05
**Anita Riccio-Spagnuolo** (X)	**4,064**	**12.17**	+0.26
**Mark Carrick** (X)	**3,896**	**11.67**	-0.49
**Terry Burns**	**3,156**	**9.45**	-1.33
Brad Krewench	2,641	7.91	--
Christopher Matis	2,547	7.63	--
Kevin O'Neil	2,434	7.29	--
David Lucier	1,783	5.34	--
Manpreet Brar	1,681	5.03	--
Brian Kovacsi	1,296	3.88	--
**Total valid votes**	-	-	
**Total rejected, unmarked and declined votes**	-	-	
**Turnout**	-	30.13	-10.99
**Eligible voters**	25,702		
Note: Candidate campaign colours are based on the prominent colour used in campaign items (signs, literature, etc.) and are used as a visual differentiation between candidates. Colours from prior party affiliations may be used as well.

=== 2025 LaSalle Municipal By-election ===
Councillor Sue Desjarlais passed away on 21 April, 2025. This left an open seat on council, so the town council voted to hold a by-election to fill the vacancy, which would be held on 10 October, 2025.

Candidate (vote for 1)	Popular vote		
Candidate (vote for 1)	Votes	%	±%
**Mike Seguin**	**1,197**	**35.19**	--
Brad Krewench	824	24.22	+16.31
Robert Moore	729	21.43	--
Kate Paddon	216	6.35	--
Robbie Durling	207	6.08	--
Tory McKay	171	5.03	--
Brandon Meloche	49	1.44	--
**Total valid votes**	3,393	99.74	
**Total rejected, unmarked and declined votes**	9	0.26	
**Turnout**	3,402	12.46	-17.67
**Eligible voters**	27,294		
Note: Candidate campaign colours are based on the prominent colour used in campaign items (signs, literature, etc.) and are used as a visual differentiation between candidates. Colours from prior party affiliations may be used as well.

== Leamington ==
The following are the results for Mayor, Deputy Mayor, and the Municipal Council of Leamington.

=== Mayor ===
Mayoral Candidate	Vote	%
**Hilda Macdonald** **(X)**	**4,333**	**53.55**
Jimmy Simoni	3,004	37.13
Chris Biron	754	9.32

=== Deputy Mayor ===
Deputy Mayoral Candidate	Vote	%
**Larry Verbeke (X)**	**3,229**	**41.06**
Shelly J. Quick	2,330	29.63
John Tofflemire	2,305	29.31

=== Leamington Municipal Council ===
The following candidates ran for the Leamington Municipal Council. All candidates run on a town-wide constituency, and the top 5 placed candidates are elected.

Candidate	Vote	%
**Tim Wilkinson (X)**	**4,253**	**12.45**
**Bill Dunn (X)**	**4,250**	**12.44**
**Paul Tiessen (X)**	**3,949**	**11.56**
**Anthony Abraham**	**2,806**	**8.22**
**Heather Latam**	**2,363**	**6.92**
Corey Robertson	2,210	6.47
Derek Friesen	2,166	6.34
Issac Schmitt	2,120	6.21
Christine Lehn	2,079	6.09
Tara Adams	1,684	4.93
Dave Metcalfe	1,637	4.79
Christine Montgomery	1,412	4.13
Kyle Sousa	1,286	3.76
Mark Stevenson	806	2.36
Oscar Ramirez	792	2.32
Gerald Barros	344	1.01

== Tecumseh ==
The following are the results for Mayor, Deputy Mayor, & the Municipal Council of Tecumseh.

=== Mayor ===
Candidate	Popular vote		
Candidate	Votes	%	±%
**Gary McNamara**	**Acclaimed**	**100**	--
Note: Candidate campaign colours are based on the prominent colour used in campaign items (signs, literature, etc.) and are used as a visual differentiation between candidates. Colours from prior party affiliations may be used as well.

=== Deputy Mayor ===
Candidate	Popular vote		
Candidate	Votes	%	±%
**Joe Bachetti**	**Acclaimed**	**100**	--
Note: Candidate campaign colours are based on the prominent colour used in campaign items (signs, literature, etc.) and are used as a visual differentiation between candidates. Colours from prior party affiliations may be used as well.

=== Ward 1 ===
Candidate	Popular vote		
Candidate	Votes	%	±%
**Alica Higgison**	**1,068**	**72.55**	--
Daniel Hofgartner	404	27.44	--
Note: Candidate campaign colours are based on the prominent colour used in campaign items (signs, literature, etc.) and are used as a visual differentiation between candidates. Colours from prior party affiliations may be used as well.

=== Ward 2 ===
Candidate	Popular vote		
Candidate	Votes	%	±%
**James Dorner**	**1,139**	**70.92**	--
Antoni Tanbunan	467	29.07	--
Note: Candidate campaign colours are based on the prominent colour used in campaign items (signs, literature, etc.) and are used as a visual differentiation between candidates. Colours from prior party affiliations may be used as well.

=== Ward 3 ===
Candidate	Popular vote		
Candidate	Votes	%	±%
**Rick "Rico" Tonial** (X)	**881**	**75.75**	+13.02
Aleksander Ilijoski	282	24.24	--
Note: Candidate campaign colours are based on the prominent colour used in campaign items (signs, literature, etc.) and are used as a visual differentiation between candidates. Colours from prior party affiliations may be used as well.

=== Ward 4 ===
Candidate	Popular vote		
Candidate	Votes	%	±%
**Brian Houston** (X)	**Acclaimed**	**100**	--
Note: Candidate campaign colours are based on the prominent colour used in campaign items (signs, literature, etc.) and are used as a visual differentiation between candidates. Colours from prior party affiliations may be used as well.

=== Ward 5 ===
Candidate	Popular vote		
Candidate	Votes	%	±%
**Tonia Jobin** (X)	**612**	**74.18**	-25.82
Michael Strong	213	25.81	--
Note: Candidate campaign colours are based on the prominent colour used in campaign items (signs, literature, etc.) and are used as a visual differentiation between candidates. Colours from prior party affiliations may be used as well.

== Pelee ==
Like Windsor, the Township of Pelee is part of Essex County officially, but does not send members to the Essex County Council.

The following are the results for Mayor, and the Municipal Council of Pelee. The position of Deputy Mayor is appointed to the candidate that gets first place on the ballot.

=== Mayor ===
Incumbent Mayor Ray Durocher announced his retirement from politics in May 2022.

Mayoral Candidate	Vote	%
**Cathy Miller**	**273**	**85.57**
Larry Bailey	46	14.43

=== Pelee Municipal Council ===
The following candidates ran for the Pelee Municipal Council. All candidates run on a town-wide constituency, and the top 4 placed candidates are elected – with the first-place winner being appointed Deputy Mayor and the remaining top three candidates elected as Councillors.

Candidate	Vote	%
**Dayne Malloch (X)** **(appointed Deputy Mayor)**	**257**	**24.50**
**David Delellis (X)**	**232**	**22.12**
**Sherri Smith Ouellette (X)**	**201**	**19.16**
**Stephanie Briggs-Crawford**	**194**	**18.49**
Michelle Taylor	165	15.73
