= Windsor City Hall =

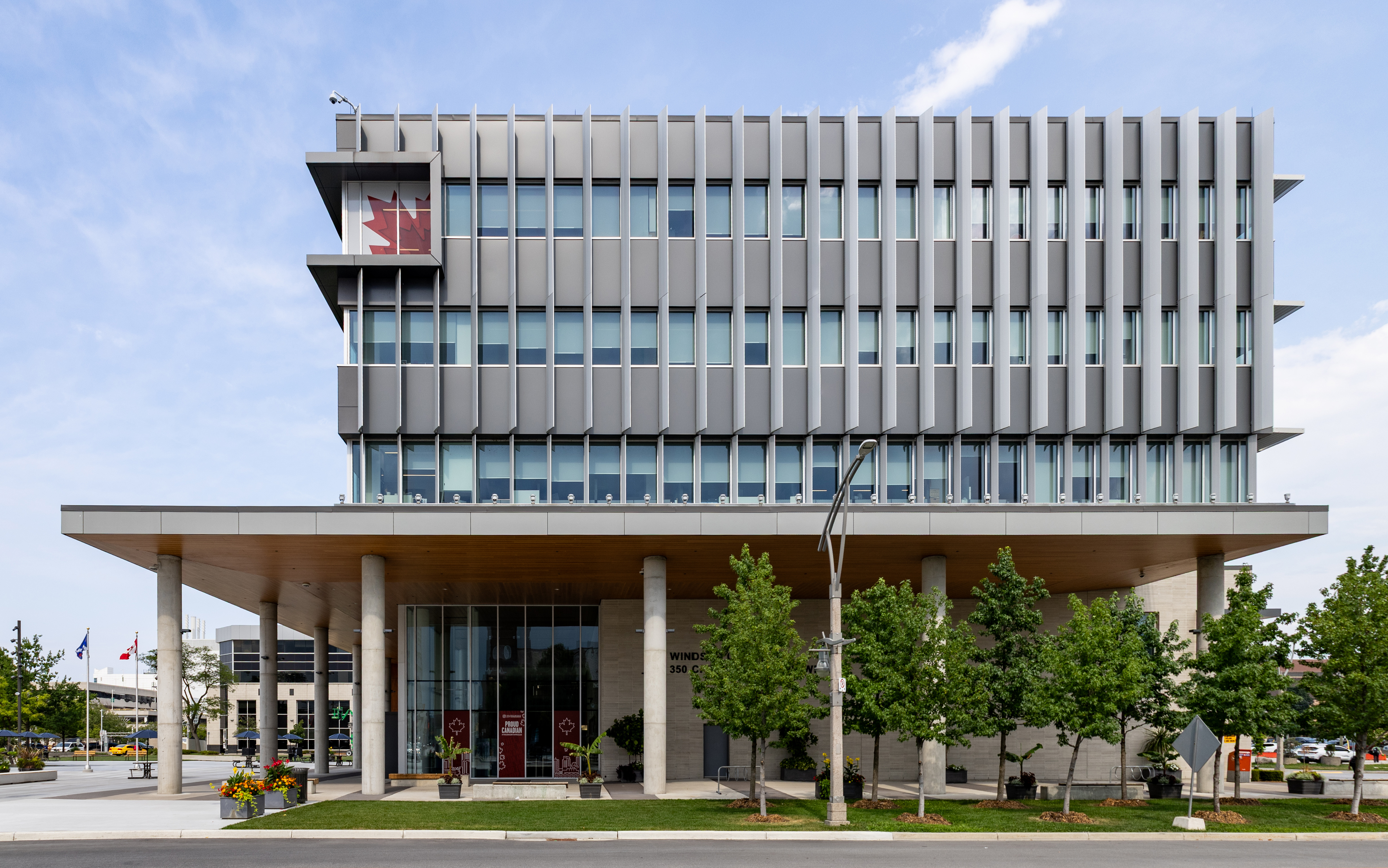
- Main building of Windsor City Hall

General information
- Type: City hall
- Location: 350 City Hall Square West; Windsor, Ontario; N9A 6S1
- Coordinates: 42°19′1″N 83°2′6″W
- Groundbreaking: 2016
- Completed: 2018
- Cost: CA$30 million
- Owner: City of Windsor

Technical details
- Floor count: 5

Design and construction
- Architecture firm: Moriyama & Teshima Architects; Archittectura Inc.

Windsor City Hall is the seat of the municipal government of Windsor, Ontario, Canada. The mayor's office and Windsor City Council are housed in the main building at 350 City Hall Square West, while additional city services are located in an adjacent building at 400 City Square East in downtown Windsor.

== History ==
The site of the hall was previously Central Public School, thereafter the city purchased the property in 1904 and served it as the city hall. In 1955, construction began on a new building that was completed in 1956 at a cost of $2.1 million. In 2005, an additional structure of the Windsor City Hall campus opened across the street from the main building, at 400 City Hall Square. The second building now houses agencies of the municipal, provincial and federal governments to provide residents several public services at a single location.

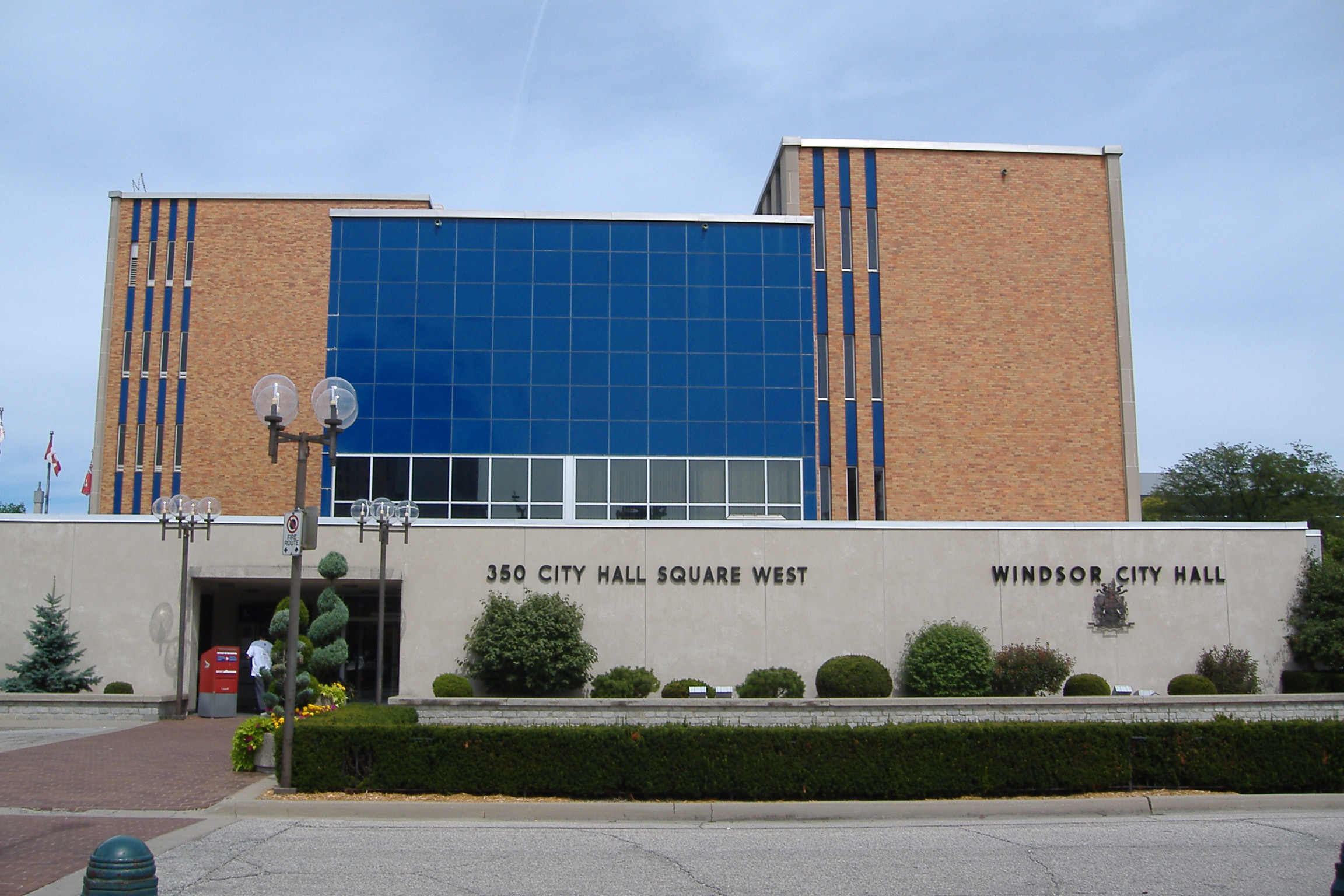
Old City Hall, demolished in 2019

Issues began to appear in the 1957-era building in the early 1990s with water infiltration, heating system failures, inadequate space and foul odors plaguing building occupants. In addition, any renovations would need to address asbestos insulation throughout the building and accessibility issues bringing estimated costs to approximately $20 million versus $34 million for a new facility. A new building was a topic during the 2014 budget meeting in 2013. In the meeting, the council voted 10 to 1 in favour of a new building. In October 2014, the Windsor City Council approved plans to demolish the current city hall and construct a new facility.

Construction of the new building was scheduled to start late 2015 with completion expected in 2017–2018, but was delayed until mid-2016. The project was estimated to cost CA$23 million. The new city hall opened to the public on 22 May 2018. The grand opening took place on 26 May 2018. In July 2025, a civic esplanade adjecent to the city hall was opened. Built at a cost of approximately $15 million dollars, it consists of a multi-purpose concrete slab, water display, and public washrooms.
