= 2006 Windsor municipal election =

Election in 2006

← 2003	November 13, 2006	2010 →
- Turnout: 38.20% (▼6.80 pp)
Candidate	Eddie Francis	David Wonham
Popular vote	44,527	10,308
Percentage	77.56%	17.95%
Mayor before election
Eddie Francis
Elected mayor
Eddie Francis

The 2006 Windsor municipal election occurred on November 13, 2006, to elect the Mayor of Windsor, Windsor City Council and the Greater Essex County District School Board, Windsor Essex Catholic District School Board, Conseil scolaire catholique Providence and Conseil scolaire Viamonde.

The election was held on the same day as elections in every other municipality in Ontario, as well as the elections in neighbouring towns in Essex County.

This was the last election under the ward boundary system in which Windsor had five wards, each electing two councillors. The passage of By-Law 133-2009 in 2009 divided Windsor's 5 dual-member wards into 10 single-member wards.

This was also the last municipal election held before the Ontario government passed Bill 212 - the Good Government Act in 2009, which increased the term length for Ontario municipalities to four years instead of three years.

== Mayor ==
The following is a list of candidates and their results. Incumbents are noted with an (X). Elected officials are in bold.

Mayoral Candidate	Vote	%
**Eddie Francis (X)**	**44,527**	**77.56**
David Wonham	10,308	17.95
Mohamed Chams	1,502	2.62
Mohamad-Ali Beydoun	1,074	1.87

== City Council ==
The following is a list of candidates and their results. Incumbents are noted with an (X). Elected officials are in bold.

=== Ward 1 ===
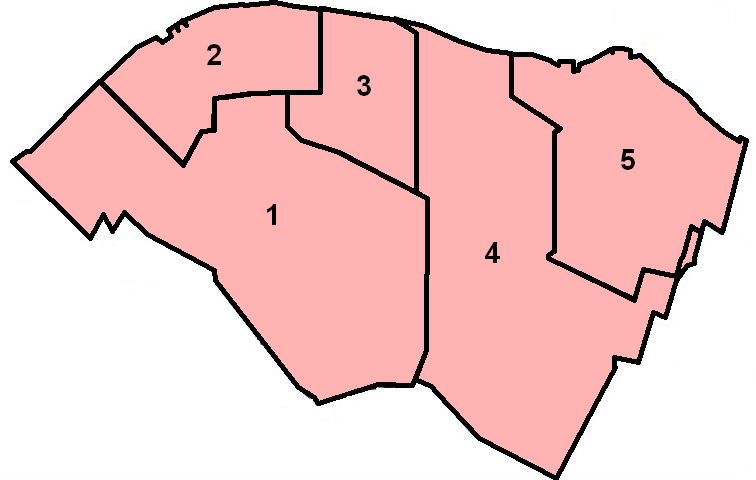
Map of Windsor's 5 wards in use for this election.

Joyce Zuk, one of the incumbent Councillors, announced she would be standing down this election.

Council Candidate (elect 2)	Vote	%
**David Brister (X)**	**10,437**	**32.50**
**Drew Dilkens**	**8,827**	**27.49**
Gregory R. Baggio	4,564	14.21
Alphonso Teshuba	2,771	8.63
Tom Lynd	1,621	5.05
Mohammad Khan	1,437	4.48
Henry Lau	1,268	3.94
Ed Kobrosly	1,187	3.70

=== Ward 2 ===
Council Candidate (elect 2)	Vote	%
**Ron Jones (X)**	**4,497**	**37.41**
**Caroline Postma (X)**	**2,728**	**22.69**
Gail Growe	1,854	15.42
Dan Petoran	1,697	14.12
Chris Schnurr	434	3.61
Chris Richie	424	3.53
Tom Livingston	388	3.23

=== Ward 3 ===
Council Candidate (elect 2)	Vote	%
**Fulvio Valentinis (X)**	**5,679**	**37.51**
**Alan Halberstadt (X)**	**5,369**	**35.46**
Anthony "Tony" Blak	4,091	

=== Ward 4 ===
Council Candidate (elect 2)	Vote	%
**Bill Marra**	**7,163**	**36.13**
**Ken Lewenza, Jr. (X)**	**4,879**	**24.61**
Dave Cassivi (X)	3,726	18.79
Ed Sleiman	3,259	16.44
John Middleton	801	4.04

=== Ward 5 ===
Thomas Wilson, one of the incumbent Councillors, announced he would be standing down this election.

Council Candidate (elect 2)	Vote	%
**Jo-Anne Gignac (X)**	**9,220**	**36.72**
**Percy Hatfield**	**9,080**	**36.16**
Frank Batal	1,956	7.79
Irene Taylor	1,743	6.94
William (B.J.) Taylor	929	3.70
Steve Farrell	800	3.19
Stephane Beaudin	692	2.78
Bill Kachmaryk	691	2.75

=== Greater Essex County School Board Trustees ===
Wards 1, 2, and 3 (elect four)

- **Tom Kilpatrick (X): 10,066, 17.12%**
- **Beth Cooper (X): 9.874, 16.79%**
- **Lisa Gretzky: 9,285, 15.79%**
- **Kim McKinley: 8,604, 14.63%**
- Shelly Harding-Smith (X): 8,216, 13.97%
- David Ferguson: 7,700, 13.10%
- Sabrina Baskey-East: 5,050, 8.59%

Wards 4 and 5 (elect two)

- **Gale Simko Hatfield (X): 7,737, 34.07%**
- **Cheryl Lovell: 5,808, 25.57%**
- Steve Micallef (X): 3,578, 15.76%
- Jeewen Gill: 2,942, 12.95%
- Kenny (Kenny G.) Gbadebo, 2,645, 11.65%

=== Windsor Essex Catholic District School Board Trustees ===
(Elect one per ward)

Ward 1

- **John Macri (X)- acclaimed**

Ward 2

- **Patrick Keane (X): 831, 39.07%**
- Frank Favot: 812, 38.18%
- Robert J. Potomski, 484, 22.78%

Ward 3

- **Shannon Porcellini (X): 936, 35.96%**
- Bernard Maztromattei: 886, 34.04%
- Gerry N. Bondy: 781, 30.00%

Ward 4

- **Fred Alexander (X): 2,572, 64.43%**
- Daniel Roncone: 1,420, 35.57%

Ward 5

- **Barbara Holland (X) - acclaimed**

=== Conseil Scolaire Public de District du Centre Sud-Ouest Trustee ===
(Elect one)

County of Essex

- **François Gratton (X) - acclaimed**

=== Conseil Scolaire de District des Ecoles Catholique Sud-Ouest Trustees ===
Elect one

City of Windsor, Ward 1 and Town of LaSalle (combined)

- **Adrien Bezaire (X)- acclaimed**

Wards 2, 3, and 4 (combined)

- **Cecile Vachon (X)- acclaimed**

City of Windsor, Ward 5 and Town of Tecumseh (combined)

- **Joseph Bisnaire (X) - acclaimed**

== See also ==
- List of mayors of Windsor, Ontario
- 2006 Ontario municipal elections
- Windsor, Ontario
- Windsor City Council
