= 2022 Windsor municipal election =

Election in Ontario, Canada

- October 24, 2022
- Turnout: 31.57% (▼3.64 pp)
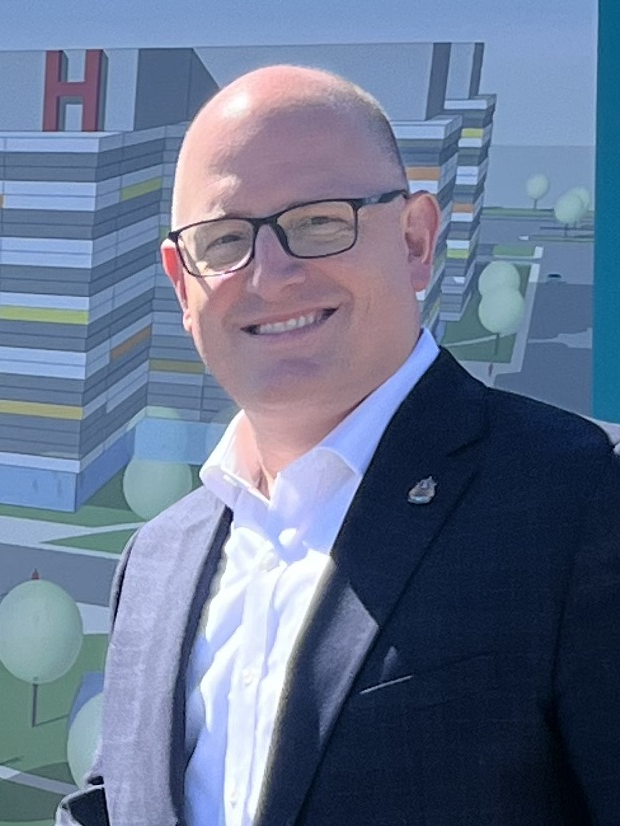
Nominee	Drew Dilkens	Chris Holt
Popular vote	26,018	19,177
Percentage	52.51	38.70
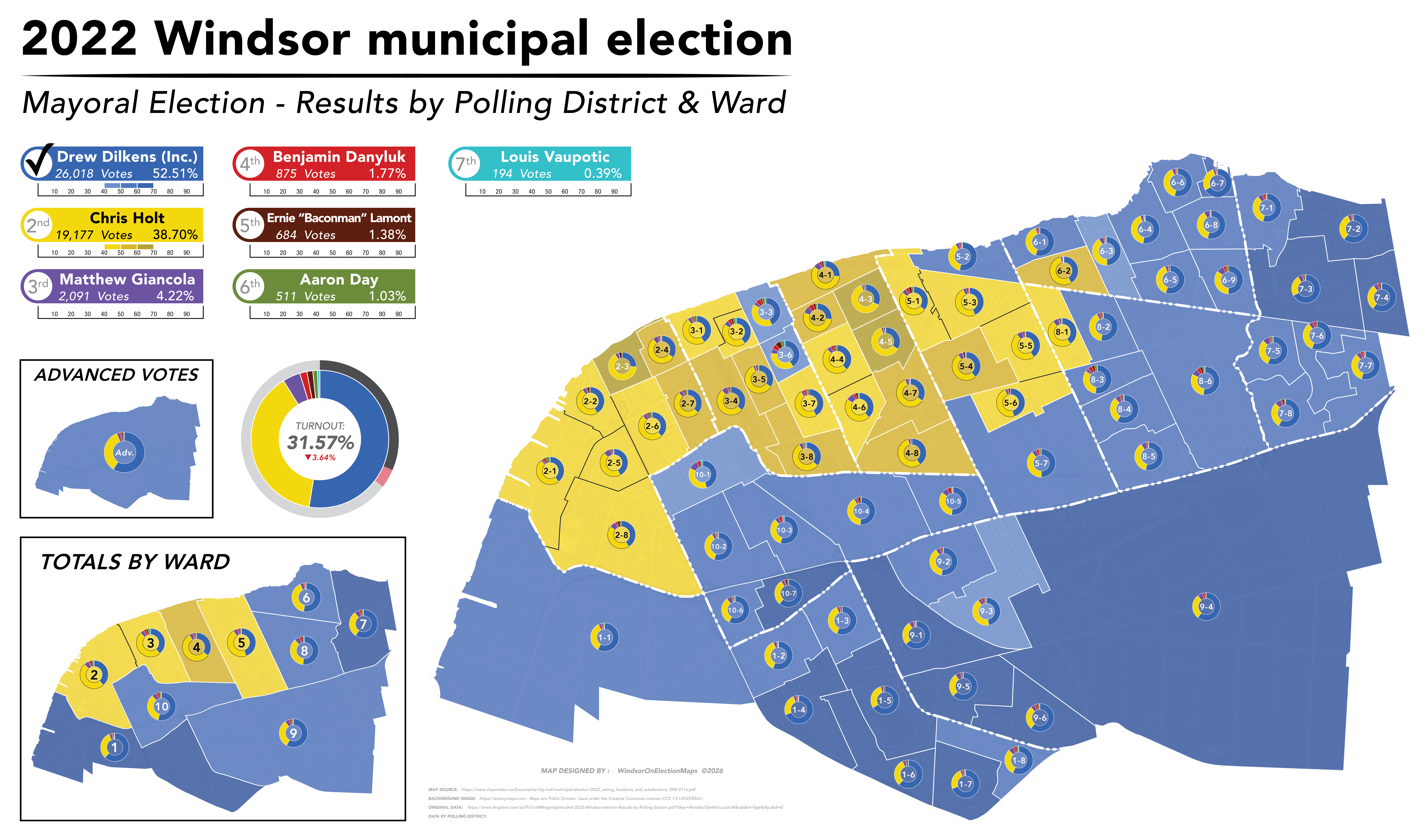
- Map showing the winning candidate's vote strength in each of the 10 wards and their respective polling districts. The districts shaded in Blue voted a majority for Drew Dilkens, and Yellow voted a majority for Chris Holt. Pie Charts indicate the total vote of all candidates per Ward/polling district.
Mayor before election
Drew Dilkens
Elected mayor
Drew Dilkens

The 2022 Windsor municipal election was held on October 24, 2022, to elect the Mayor of Windsor, Windsor City Council and the Greater Essex County District School Board, Windsor Essex Catholic District School Board, Conseil scolaire catholique Providence and Conseil scolaire Viamonde.

The election was held on the same day as elections in every other municipality in Ontario, as well as the elections in the neighbouring towns in Essex County.

The candidates registered to run for Windsor City Council are as follows:

== Mayor ==
Mayor Drew Dilkens faced six candidates, but his primary challenger was Ward 4 city councillor Chris Holt. This would be the last election contested by local perennial candidate Ernie "The Bacon Man" Lamont, who died from cancer in December 2023. It was his sixth attempt to run for Mayor.

Candidate	Popular vote		
Candidate	Votes	%	±%
Drew Dilkens (X)	26,018	52.51	-6.89
Chris Holt	19,177	38.70	--
Matthew Giancola	2,091	4.22	--
Benjamin Danyluk	875	1.77	--
Ernie "The Baconman" Lamont	684	1.38	-0.75
Aaron Day	511	1.03	--
Louis Vaupotic	194	0.39	--
Total valid votes	49,550	98.95	
Total rejected, unmarked and declined votes	528	1.05	
Turnout	50,078	31.57	-3.64
Eligible voters	158,604		
Note: Candidate campaign colours are based on the prominent colour used in campaign items (signs, literature, etc.) and are used as a visual differentiation between candidates. Colours from prior party affiliations may be used as well.
Sources: City of Windsor

== City Council ==
=== Ward 1 ===
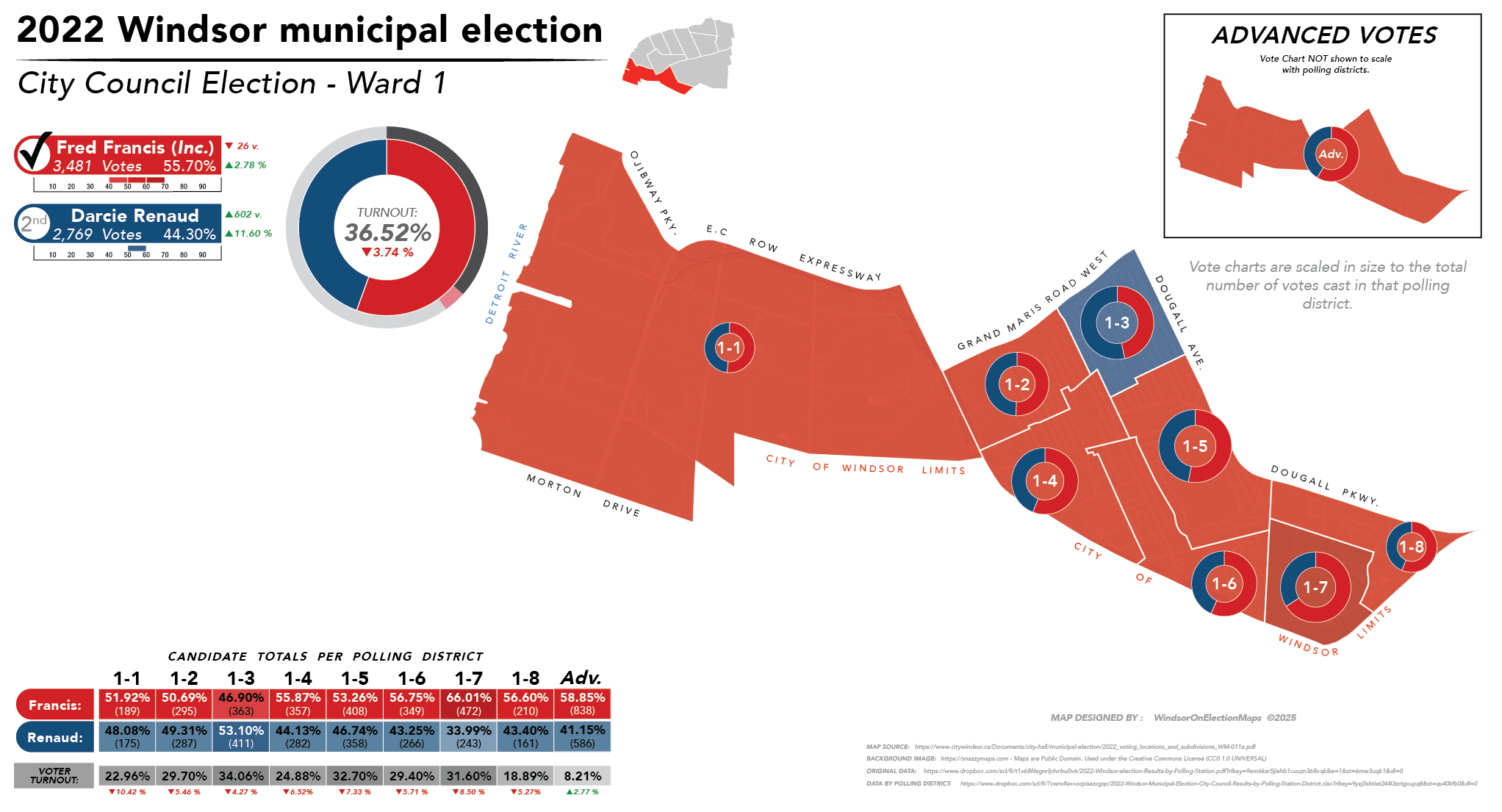
Results of the election in Ward 1. Polling districts are shaded by which candidate gained the majority of the vote.

Candidate	Popular vote		
Candidate	Votes	%	±%
Fred Francis (X)	3,481	55.70	+2.78
Darcie Renaud	2,769	44.30	+11.60
Total valid votes	6,250	98.68	
Total rejected, unmarked and declined votes	83	1.32	
Turnout	6,333	36.52	-3.74
Eligible voters	17,342		
Note: Candidate campaign colours are based on the prominent colour used in campaign items (signs, literature, etc.) and are used as a visual differentiation between candidates. Colours from prior party affiliations may be used as well.
Sources: City of Windsor

=== Ward 2 ===
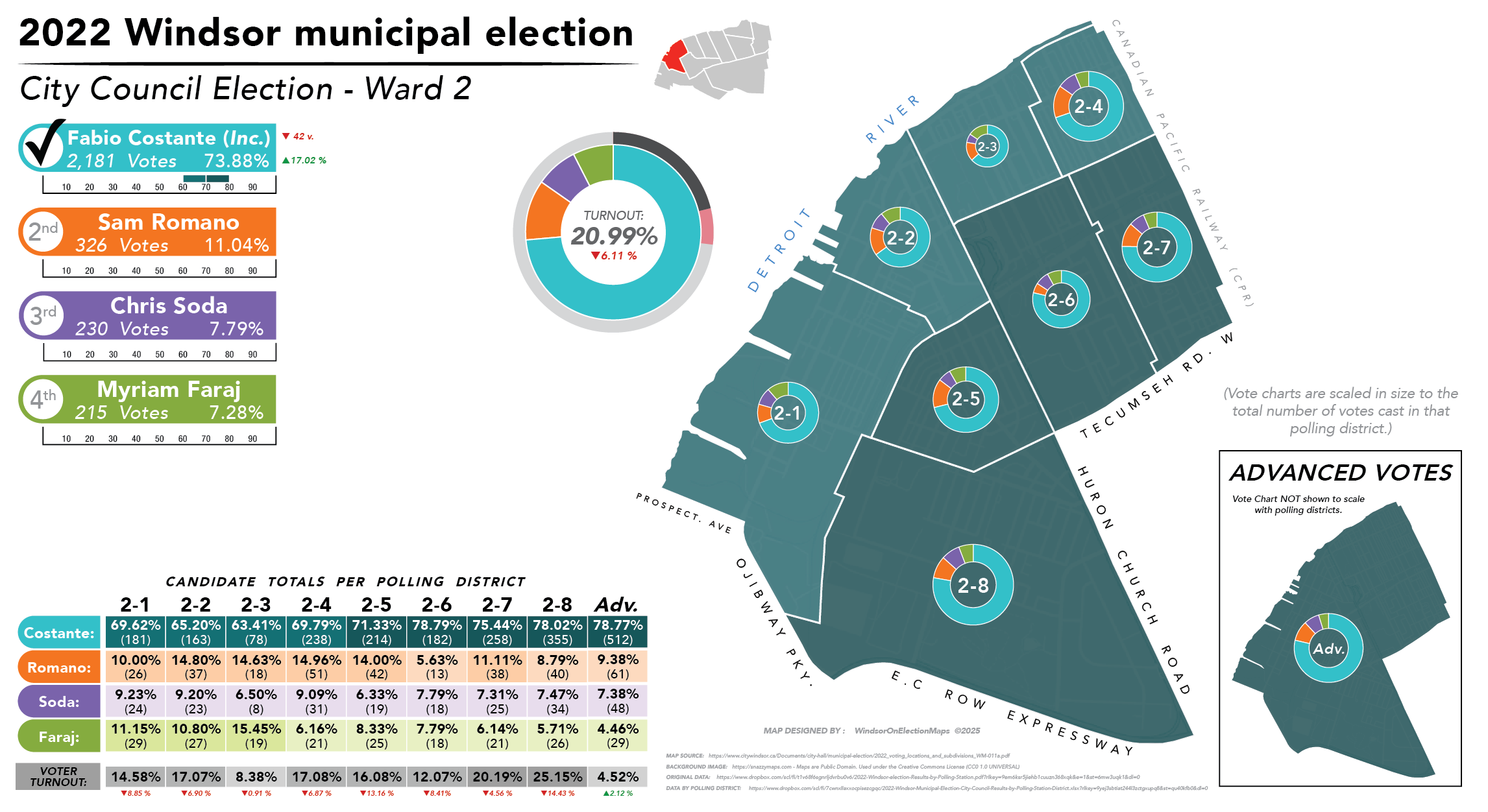
Results of the election in Ward 2. Polling districts are shaded by which candidate gained the majority of the vote.

Candidate	Popular vote		
Candidate	Votes	%	±%
Fabio Costante (X)	2,181	73.88	+17.02
Sam Romano	326	11.04	--
Chris Soda	230	7.79	--
Myriam Faraj	215	7.28	--
Total valid votes	2,952	97.67	
Total rejected, unmarked and declined votes	69	2.33	
Turnout	3,021	20.99	-6.11
Eligible voters	14,391		
Note: Candidate campaign colours are based on the prominent colour used in campaign items (signs, literature, etc.) and are used as a visual differentiation between candidates. Colours from prior party affiliations may be used as well.
Sources: City of Windsor

=== Ward 3 ===
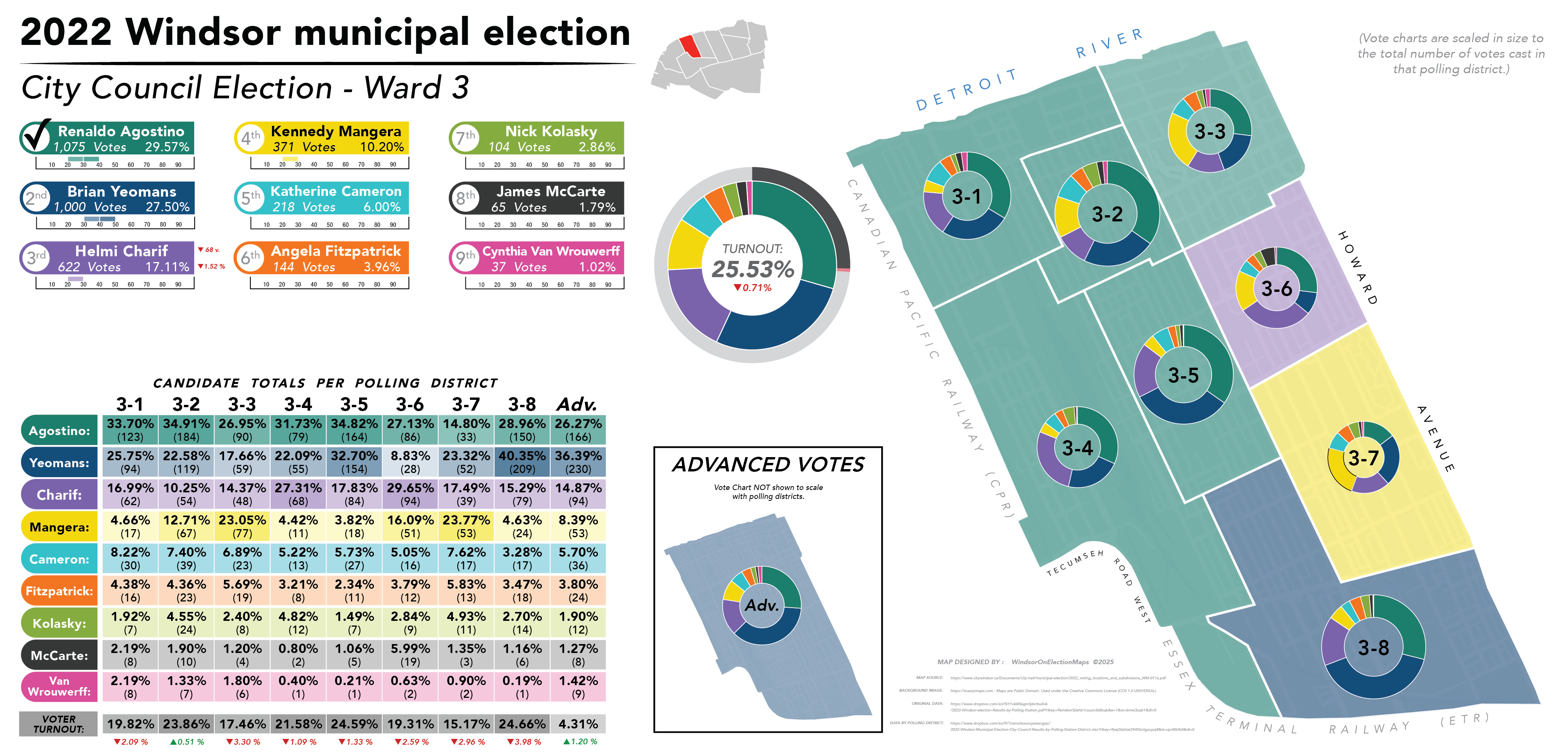
Results of the election in Ward 3. Polling districts are shaded by which candidate gained the majority of the vote.

Incumbent Councillor Rino Bortolin announced his retirement from City Council in July 2022.

Candidate	Popular vote		
Candidate	Votes	%	±%
Renaldo Agostino	1,075	29.57	--
Brian Yeomans	1,000	27.50	--
Helmi Charif	622	17.11	-1.52
Kennedy Mangera	371	10.20	--
Katherine Cameron	218	6.00	--
Angela Fitzpatrick	144	3.96	--
Nick Kolasky	104	2.86	--
James McCarte	65	1.79	--
Cynthia Van Vrouwerff	37	1.02	--
Total valid votes	3,636	97.15	
Total rejected, unmarked and declined votes	107	2.85	
Turnout	3,743	25.53	-0.71
Eligible voters	14,664		
Note: Candidate campaign colours are based on the prominent colour used in campaign items (signs, literature, etc.) and are used as a visual differentiation between candidates. Colours from prior party affiliations may be used as well.
Sources: City of Windsor

=== Ward 4 ===
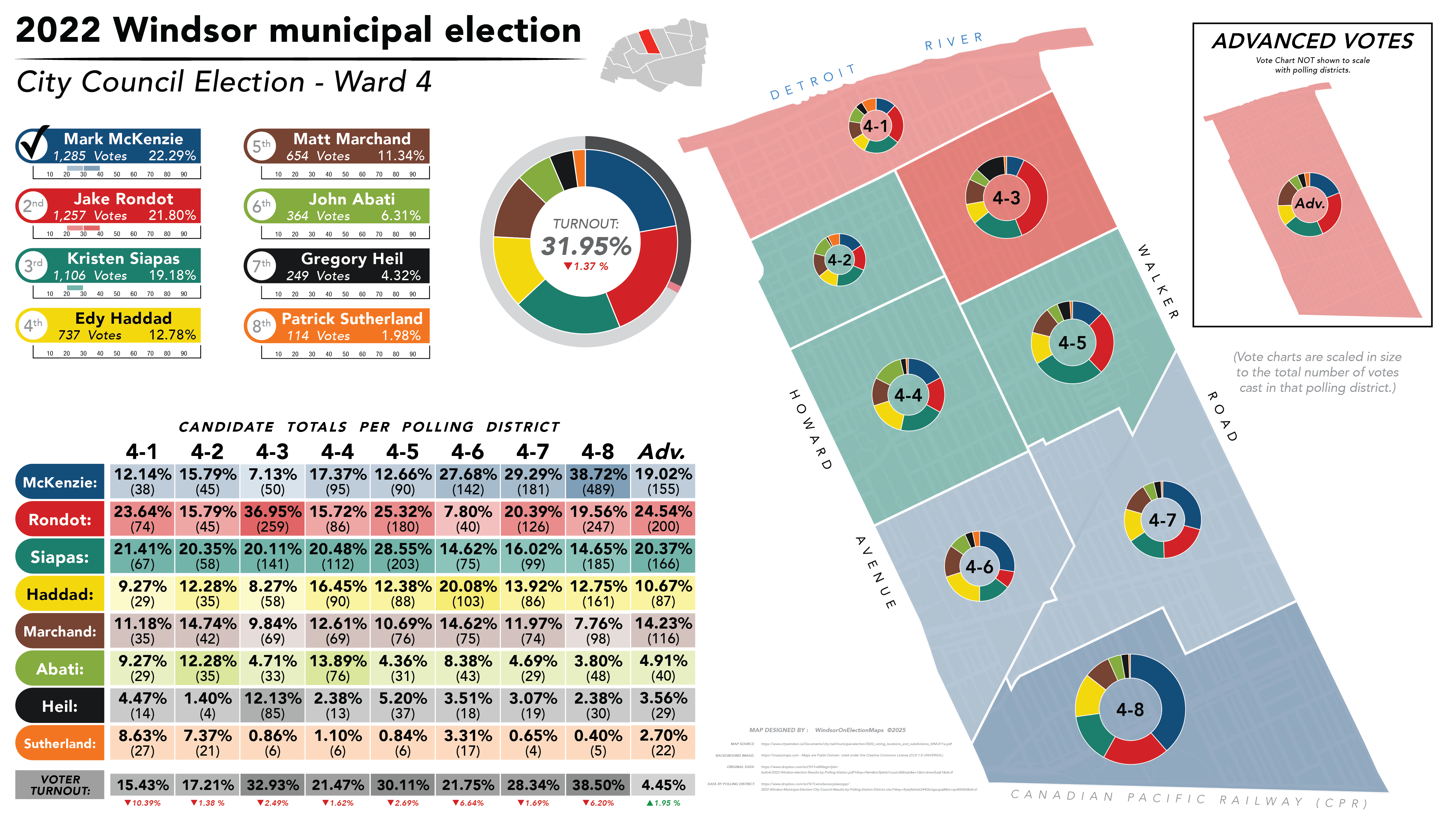
Results of the election in Ward 4. Polling districts are shaded by which candidate gained the majority of the vote.

Incumbent Councillor Chris Holt stepped down in order to run for Mayor.

Candidate	Popular vote		
Candidate	Votes	%	±%
Mark McKenzie	1,285	22.29	--
Jake Rondot	1,257	21.80	--
Kristen Siapas	1,106	19.18	--
Edy Haddad	737	12.78	--
Matt Marchand	654	11.34	--
John Abati	364	6.31	--
Gregory Heil	249	4.32	--
Patrick Sutherland	114	1.98	--
Total valid votes	5,766	98.53	
Total rejected, unmarked and declined votes	86	1.47	
Turnout	5,852	31.95	-1.37
Eligible voters	18,318		
Note: Candidate campaign colours are based on the prominent colour used in campaign items (signs, literature, etc.) and are used as a visual differentiation between candidates. Colours from prior party affiliations may be used as well.
Sources: City of Windsor

=== Ward 5 ===
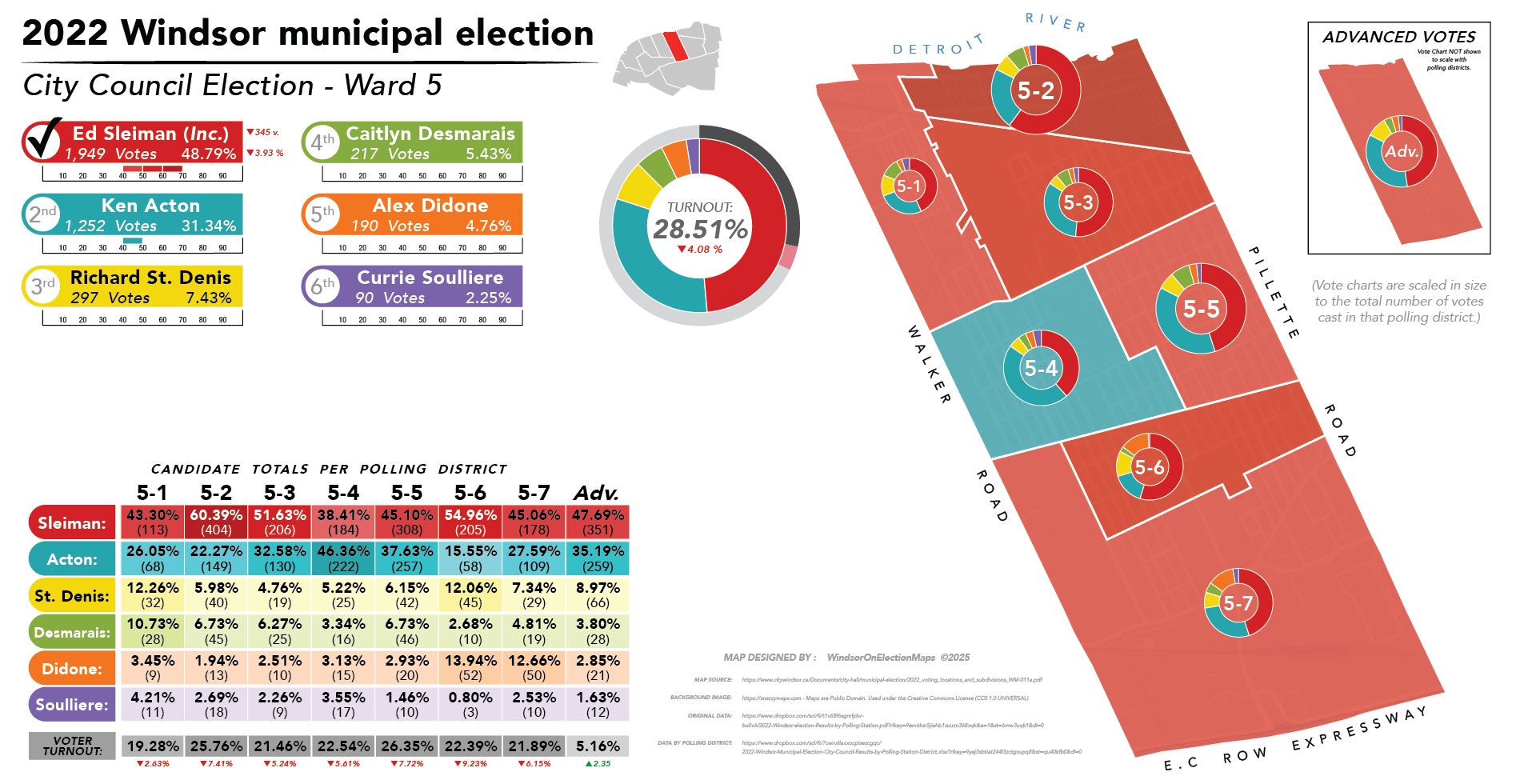
Results of the election in Ward 5. Polling districts are shaded by which candidate gained the majority of the vote.

Candidate	Popular vote		
Candidate	Votes	%	±%
Ed Sleiman (X)	1,949	48.79	-3.93
Ken Acton	1,252	31.34	--
Richard St. Denis	297	7.43	--
Caitlyn Desmarais	217	5.43	--
Alex Didone	190	4.76	--
Currie Soulliere	90	2.25	--
Total valid votes	3,995	98.10	
Total rejected, unmarked and declined votes	77	1.90	
Turnout	4,072	28.51	-4.08
Eligible voters	14,285		
Note: Candidate campaign colours are based on the prominent colour used in campaign items (signs, literature, etc.) and are used as a visual differentiation between candidates. Colours from prior party affiliations may be used as well.
Sources: City of Windsor

=== Ward 6 ===
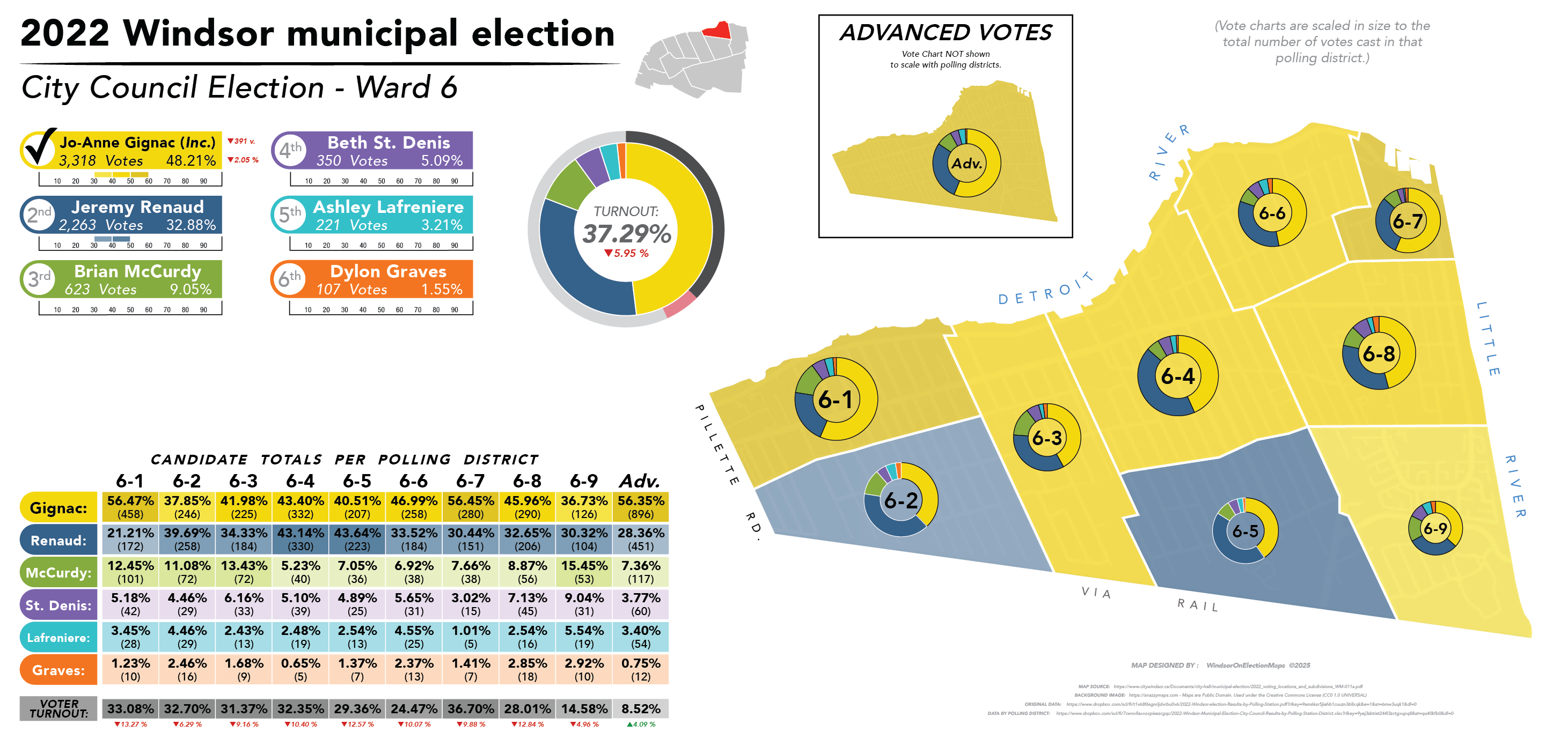
Results of the election in Ward 6. Polling districts are shaded by which candidate gained the majority of the vote.

Candidate	Popular vote		
Candidate	Votes	%	±%
Jo-Anne Gignac (X)	3,318	48.21	-2.05
Jeremy Renaud	2,263	32.88	--
Brian McCurdy	623	9.05	--
Beth St. Denis	350	5.09	--
Ashley Lafreniere	221	3.21	--
Dylon Graves	107	1.55	--
Total valid votes	6,882	98.91	
Total rejected, unmarked and declined votes	76	1.09	
Turnout	6,958	37.29	-5.95
Eligible voters	18,659		
Note: Candidate campaign colours are based on the prominent colour used in campaign items (signs, literature, etc.) and are used as a visual differentiation between candidates. Colours from prior party affiliations may be used as well.
Sources: City of Windsor

=== Ward 7 ===
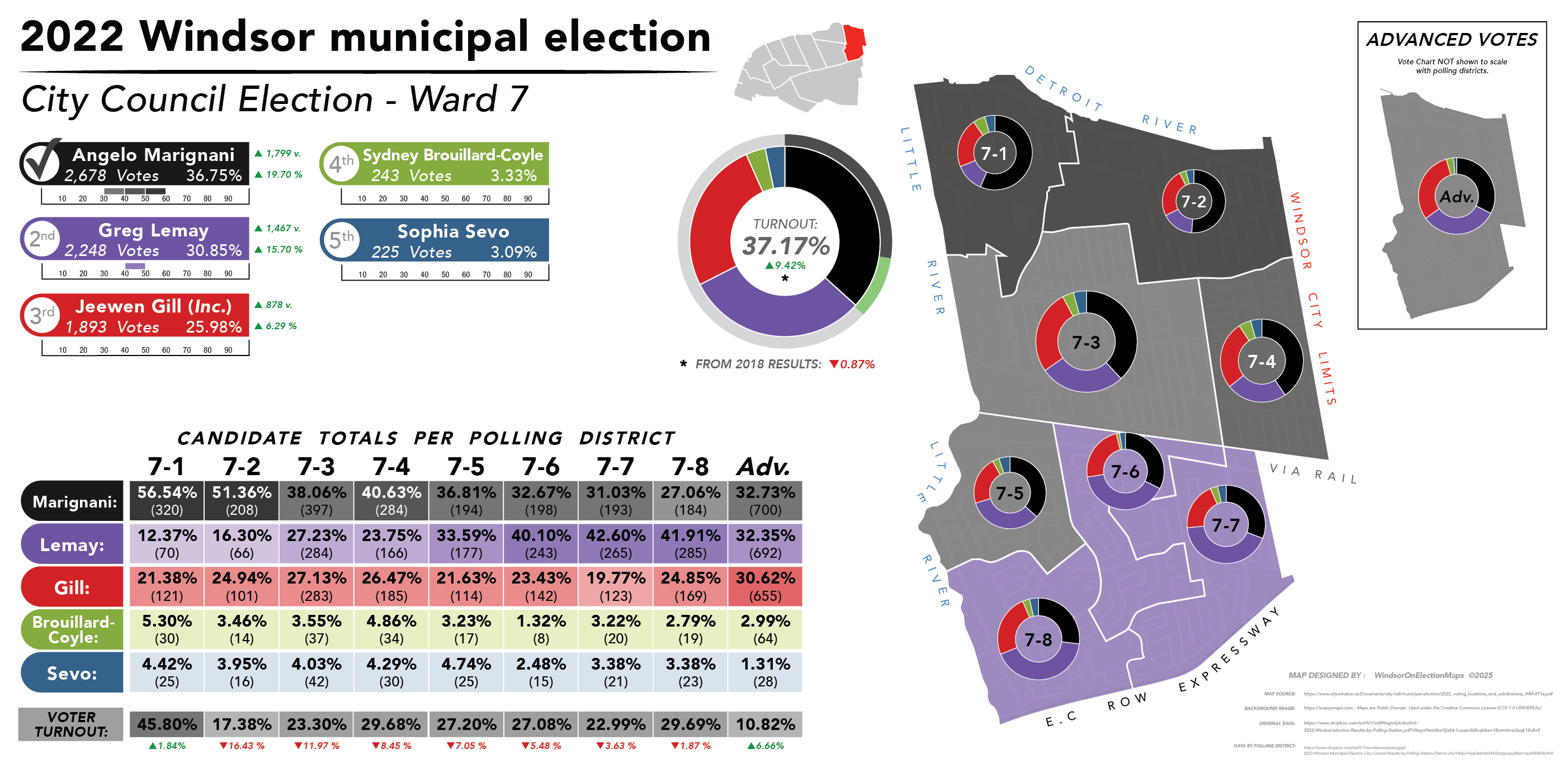
Results of the election in Ward 7. Polling districts are shaded by which candidate gained the majority of the vote.

Candidate	Popular vote		
Candidate	Votes	%	±%
Angelo Marignani	2,678	36.75	+19.70
Greg Lemay	2,248	30.85	+15.70
Jeewen Gill (X)	1,983	25.98	+6.29
Sydney Brouillard-Coyle	243	3.33	--
Sophia Sevo	225	3.09	--
Total valid votes	7,287	99.22	
Total rejected, unmarked and declined votes	58	0.78	
Turnout (from 2020 by-election)	7,345	37.17	+9.42
Turnout (from 2018 election)	7,345	37.17	-0.87
Eligible voters	19,760		
Note: Candidate campaign colours are based on the prominent colour used in campaign items (signs, literature, etc.) and are used as a visual differentiation between candidates. Colours from prior party affiliations may be used as well.
Sources: City of Windsor

=== Ward 8 ===
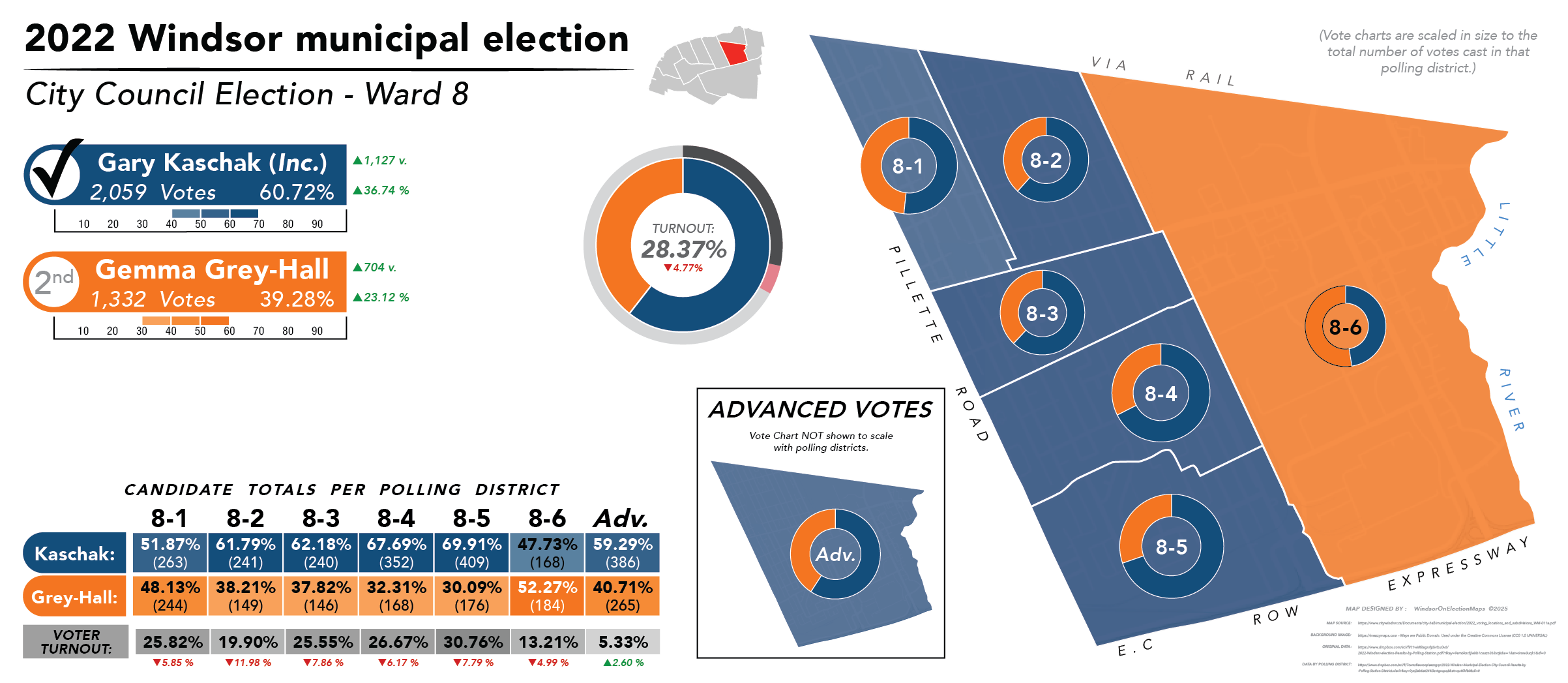
Results of the election in Ward 8. Polling districts are shaded by which candidate gained the majority of the vote.

Candidate	Popular vote		
Candidate	Votes	%	±%
Gary Kaschak (X)	2,059	60.72	+36.74
Gemma Grey-Hall	1,332	39.28	+23.12
Total valid votes	3,391	97.38	
Total rejected, unmarked and declined votes	91	2.62	
Turnout	3,465	28.37	-4.77
Eligible voters	12,214		
Note: Candidate campaign colours are based on the prominent colour used in campaign items (signs, literature, etc.) and are used as a visual differentiation between candidates. Colours from prior party affiliations may be used as well.
Sources: City of Windsor

=== Ward 9 ===
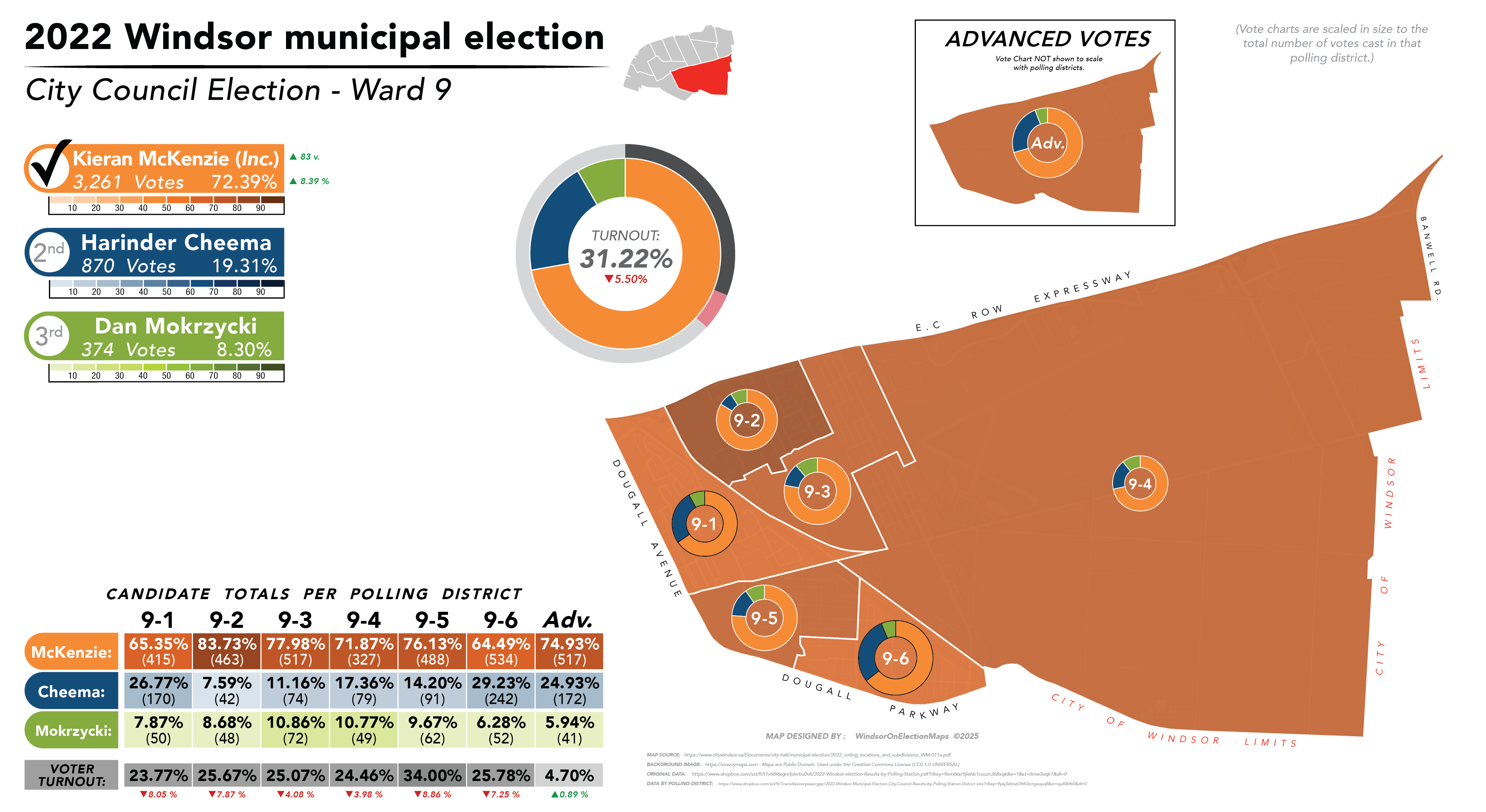
Results of the election in Ward 9. Polling districts are shaded by which candidate gained the majority of the vote.

Candidate	Popular vote		
Candidate	Votes	%	±%
Kieran McKenzie (X)	3,261	72.39	+8.39
Harinder Cheema	870	19.31	--
Dan Mokrzycki	374	8.30	--
Total valid votes	4,505	98.22	
Total rejected, unmarked and declined votes	82	1.78	
Turnout	4,587	31.22	-5.50
Eligible voters	14,693		
Note: Candidate campaign colours are based on the prominent colour used in campaign items (signs, literature, etc.) and are used as a visual differentiation between candidates. Colours from prior party affiliations may be used as well.
Sources: City of Windsor

=== Ward 10 ===
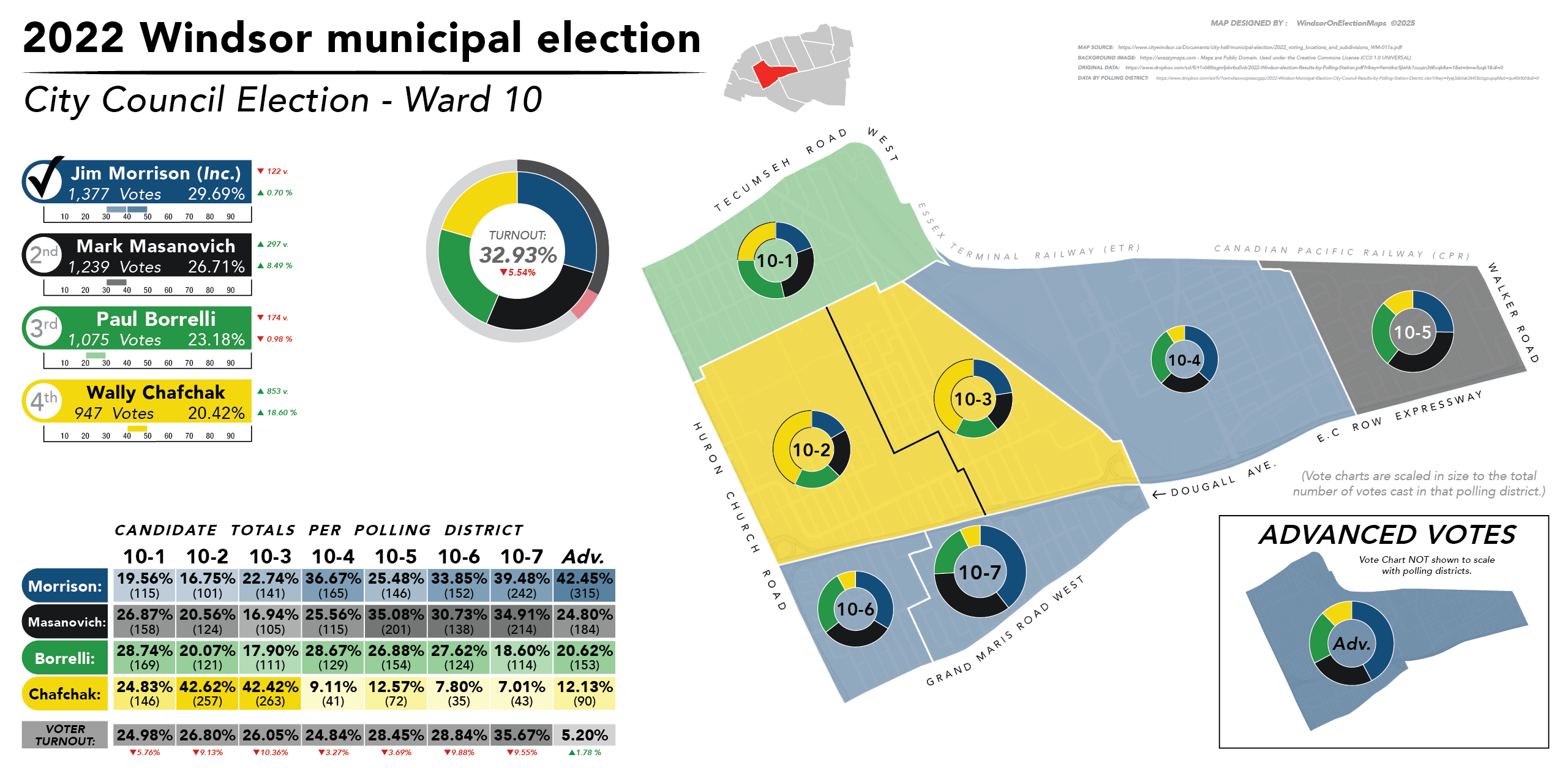
Results of the election in Ward 10. Polling districts are shaded by which candidate gained the majority of the vote.

Candidate	Popular vote		
Candidate	Votes	%	±%
Jim Morrison (X)	1,377	29.69	+0.70
Mark Masanovich	1,239	26.71	+8.49
Paul Borrelli	1,075	23.18	-0.98
Wally Chafchak	947	20.42	+18.60
Total valid votes	4,638	98.64	
Total rejected, unmarked and declined votes	64	1.36	
Turnout	4,702	32.93	-5.94
Eligible voters	14,278		
Note: Candidate campaign colours are based on the prominent colour used in campaign items (signs, literature, etc.) and are used as a visual differentiation between candidates. Colours from prior party affiliations may be used as well.
Sources: City of Windsor

== Greater Essex County District School Board ==
=== Wards 1, 2, 9 ===
Candidate (vote for 2)	Popular vote		
Candidate (vote for 2)	Votes	%	±%
Linda Qin (X)	4,384	31.41	+9.57
Kim McKinley	4,005	28.70	--
Fazle Baki	2,366	16.95	--
Maria Fernandes	1,968	14.10	--
Malek Mekawi	1,234	8.84	--
Total valid votes	-	-	
Total rejected, unmarked and declined votes	-	-	
Turnout	-	-	--
Eligible voters	-		
Note: Candidate campaign colours are based on the prominent colour used in campaign items (signs, literature, etc.) and are used as a visual differentiation between candidates. Colours from prior party affiliations may be used as well.

=== Wards 3, 4, 10 ===
Candidate (vote for 2)	Popular vote		
Candidate (vote for 2)	Votes	%	±%
Sarah Cipkar (X)	5,597	36.40	+4.87
Christie Nelson	4,243	27.59	--
Margaret Stanley	3,695	24.03	--
Sushil Jain	1,841	11.97	--
Total valid votes	-	-	
Total rejected, unmarked and declined votes	-	-	
Turnout	-	-	--
Eligible voters	-		
Note: Candidate campaign colours are based on the prominent colour used in campaign items (signs, literature, etc.) and are used as a visual differentiation between candidates. Colours from prior party affiliations may be used as well.

=== Wards 5, 6, 7, 8 ===
Candidate (vote for 2)	Popular vote		
Candidate (vote for 2)	Votes	%	±%
Cathy Cooke (X)	8,393	38.66	+5.06
Gale Simko Hatfield (X)	5,348	24.63	+0.52
AnnMarie Simpson	2,586	11.91	--
Stephanie Slipiec	2,402	11.06	--
Claudette Bernier-Schiller	1,848	8.51	--
Genevieve Coritana	1,132	5.21	--
Total valid votes	-	-	
Total rejected, unmarked and declined votes	-	-	
Turnout	-	-	--
Eligible voters	-		
Note: Candidate campaign colours are based on the prominent colour used in campaign items (signs, literature, etc.) and are used as a visual differentiation between candidates. Colours from prior party affiliations may be used as well.

== Windsor Essex Catholic District School Board ==
=== Wards 1, 10 ===
Candidate	Popular vote		
Candidate	Votes	%	±%
Fulvio Valentinis (X)	2,723	80.68	+8.22
Sanaa Boales	652	19.32	--
Total valid votes	-	-	
Total rejected, unmarked and declined votes	-	-	
Turnout	-	-	--
Eligible voters	-		
Note: Candidate campaign colours are based on the prominent colour used in campaign items (signs, literature, etc.) and are used as a visual differentiation between candidates. Colours from prior party affiliations may be used as well.

=== Wards 2, 9 ===
Candidate	Popular vote		
Candidate	Votes	%	±%
Joe Iacono	1,121	50.63	--
Shirley-Lyn Watson	1,093	49.37	--
Total valid votes	-	-	
Total rejected, unmarked and declined votes	-	-	
Turnout	-	-	--
Eligible voters	-		
Note: Candidate campaign colours are based on the prominent colour used in campaign items (signs, literature, etc.) and are used as a visual differentiation between candidates. Colours from prior party affiliations may be used as well.

=== Wards 3, 4 ===
Candidate	Popular vote		
Candidate	Votes	%	±%
Bernard Mastromattei (X)	879	50.78	+1.87
Eric Renaud	571	32.99	+5.32
Rabia Kirma	281	16.23	--
Total valid votes	-	-	
Total rejected, unmarked and declined votes	-	-	
Turnout	-	-	--
Eligible voters	-		
Note: Candidate campaign colours are based on the prominent colour used in campaign items (signs, literature, etc.) and are used as a visual differentiation between candidates. Colours from prior party affiliations may be used as well.

== Conseil Scolaire Viamonde ==
Candidate	Popular vote		
Candidate	Votes	%	±%
Badrieh Kojok	158	34.73	--
Emmanuelle Richez	140	30.77	--
Serge Dignard	88	19.34	--
Owen Herold	69	15.16	-8.88
Total valid votes	-	-	
Total rejected, unmarked and declined votes	-	-	
Turnout	-	-	--
Eligible voters	-		
Note: Candidate campaign colours are based on the prominent colour used in campaign items (signs, literature, etc.) and are used as a visual differentiation between candidates. Colours from prior party affiliations may be used as well.

== Conseil Scolaire Catholique Providence ==
=== Wards 2, 3, 4, 5, 10 ===
Candidate	Popular vote		
Candidate	Votes	%	±%
Christine Brooks	307	76.94	--
Stephane Lucky	92	23.06	--
Total valid votes	-	-	
Total rejected, unmarked and declined votes	-	-	
Turnout	-	-	--
Eligible voters	-		
Note: Candidate campaign colours are based on the prominent colour used in campaign items (signs, literature, etc.) and are used as a visual differentiation between candidates. Colours from prior party affiliations may be used as well.
