= Ward 7 (Windsor, Ontario) =

Ward in Windsor, Ontario, Canada

- Constituency for the Windsor City Council
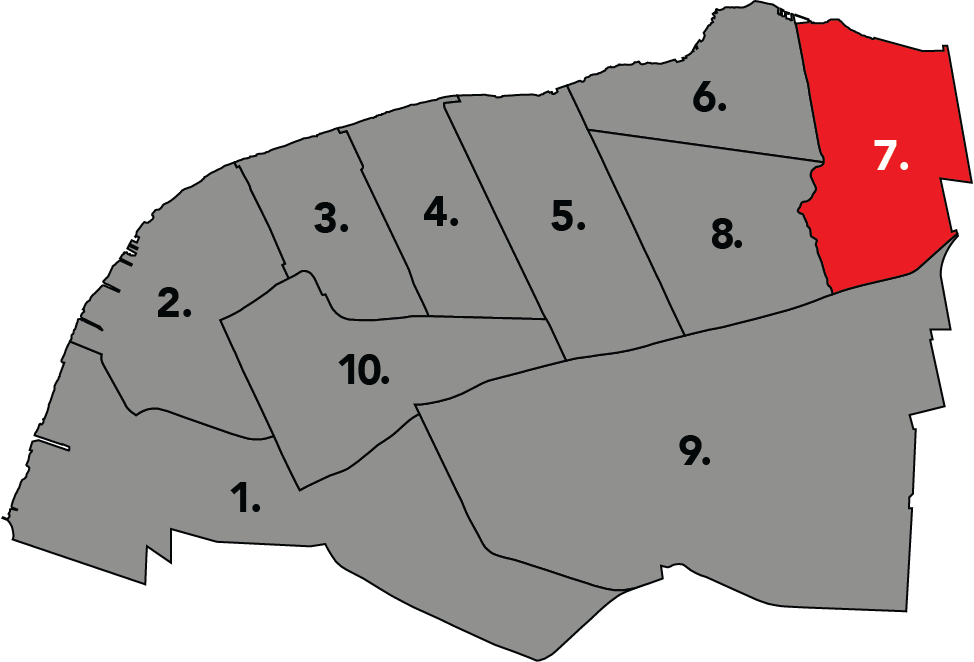
- Map of the 10 Wards of Windsor, Ontario. Ward 7 is highlighted in red.
- City: Windsor

Current constituency
- Created: 2010
- Councillor: Angelo Marignani

Ward 7 is a municipal ward in the east end of Windsor, Ontario, Canada. Its representation on Windsor City Council is currently Angelo Marignani. It contains that part of the city of Windsor east of the Little River and north of the E. C. Row Expressway. It covers the neighbourhoods of Forest Glade and East Riverside.

Ward 7 was created for the 2010 municipal elections when Windsor City council went from having five wards (two councillors each) to 10 (one councillor each). Previously most of the area had been part of Ward 5, with a small part belonging to Ward 4.

== Election results ==
NOTE: (X) denotes an incumbent candidate.

=== 2010 ===
Council Candidate	Vote	%
Percy Hatfield	4,264	52.75
Angelo Marignani	2,286	28.28
Rick Particelli	1,533	18.97

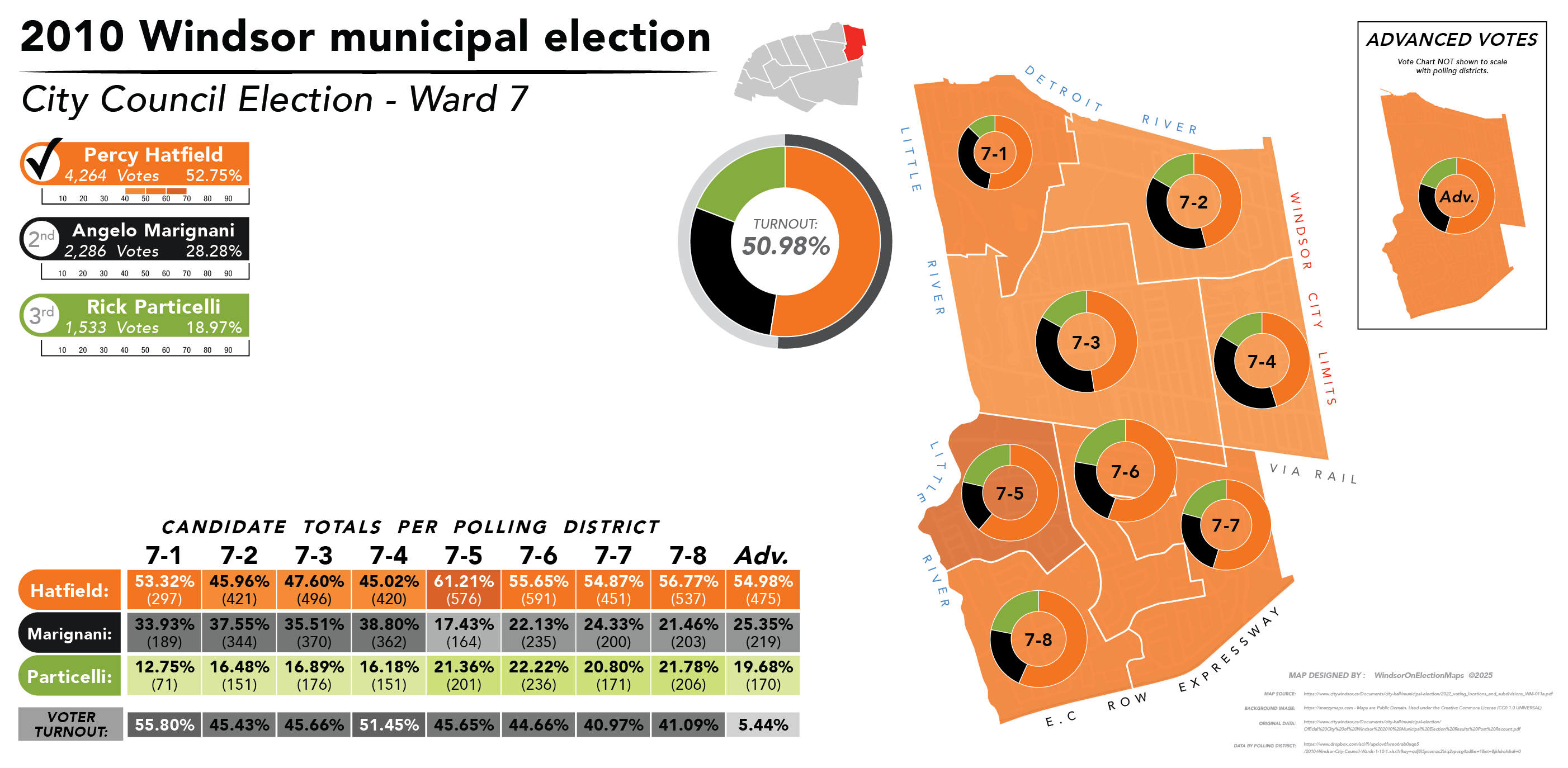
Results of the election in Ward 7 in the 2010 municipal election. Polling districts are shaded by which candidate gained the majority of the vote. Pie charts show the vote of all candidates and are scaled in size relative to the number of votes cast (except for the Advanced votes).

=== 2013 by-election ===
A by-election was held on December 9, 2013, to replace Hatfield who had been elected as an MPP for Windsor—Tecumseh.

Candidate	Popular vote		
Candidate	Votes	%	±%
Irek Kusmierczyk	1,140	31.39	--
Angelo Marignani	1,088	29.87	+1.59
Tom Wilson	639	17.55	--
Robin L. Fortier	262	7.19	--
Tosin Bello	231	6.34	--
Laurie Komon	112	3.08	--
Steve Gavrilidis	67	1.84	--
Steve Farrell	40	1.10	--
Ernie "The Baconman" Lamont	33	0.91	--
Robert Bialkowski	21	0.58	--
Clint Weir	9	0.25	--
Total valid votes	-	-	
Total rejected, unmarked and declined votes	-	-	
Turnout	-	-	--
Eligible voters	-		
Note: Candidate campaign colours are based on the prominent colour used in campaign items (signs, literature, etc.) and are used as a visual differentiation between candidates. Colours from prior party affiliations may be used as well.

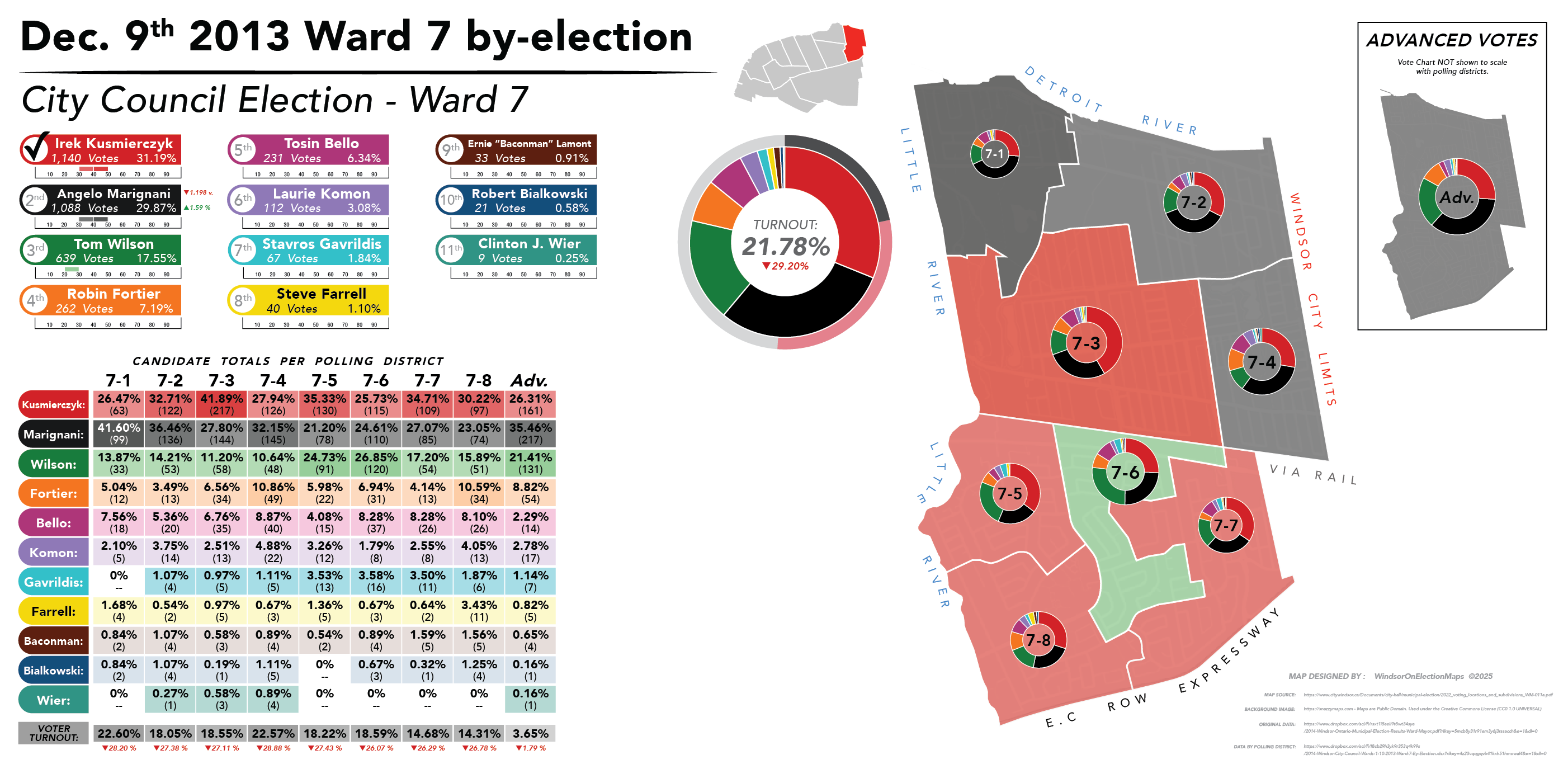
Results of the 2013 Ward 7 By-Election. Polling districts are shaded by which candidate gained the majority of the vote. Pie charts show the vote of all candidates and are scaled in size relative to the number of votes cast (except for the Advanced votes).

=== 2014 ===
Candidate	Popular vote		
Candidate	Votes	%	±%
Irek Kusmierczyk (X)	3,761	50.76	+19.57
Angelo Marignani	2,539	34.27	+4.40
Daniel William Spear	909	12.27	--
Jeffery Kocsis	200	2.70	--
Total valid votes	7,409	98.77	
Total rejected, unmarked and declined votes	93	1.23	
Turnout (from 2013 by-election)	7,502	42.55	+20.77
Turnout (from 2010 election)	7,502	42.55	-8.43
Eligible voters	17,629		
Note: Candidate campaign colours are based on the prominent colour used in campaign items (signs, literature, etc.) and are used as a visual differentiation between candidates. Colours from prior party affiliations may be used as well.

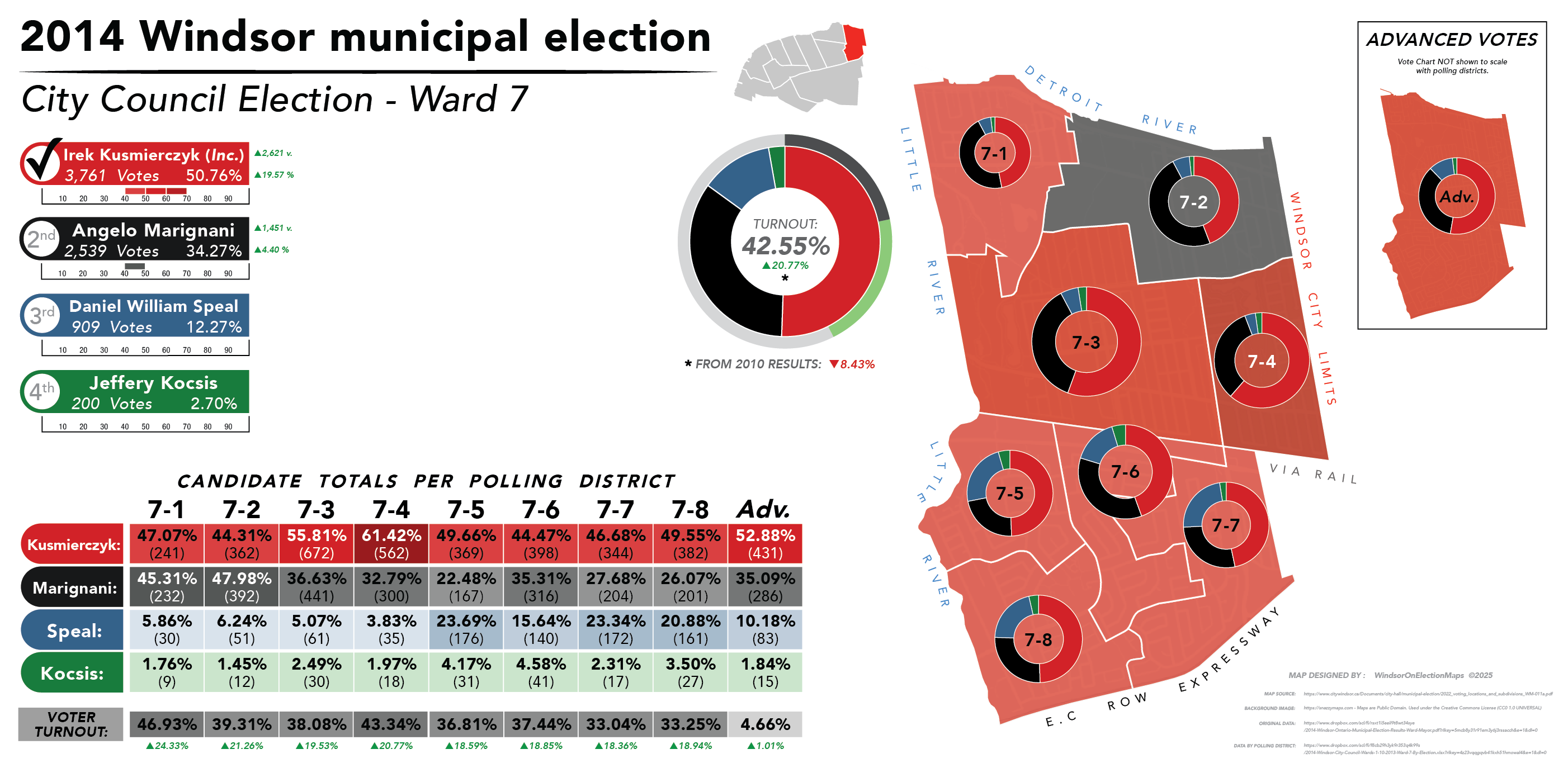
Results of the election in Ward 7 in the 2014 municipal election. Polling districts are shaded by which candidate gained the majority of the vote. Pie charts show the vote of all candidates and are scaled in size relative to the number of votes cast (except for the Advanced votes).

=== 2018 ===
Candidate	Popular vote		
Candidate	Votes	%	±%
Irek Kusmierczyk (X)	4,745	69.85	+19.09
Angelo Marignani	982	14.46	-19.81
Barbara Holland	658	9.69	--
Albert Saba	408	6.01	--
Total valid votes	6,793	98.90	
Total rejected, unmarked and declined votes	76	1.10	
Turnout	6,869	38.04	-4.51
Eligible voters	18,058		
Note: Candidate campaign colours are based on the prominent colour used in campaign items (signs, literature, etc.) and are used as a visual differentiation between candidates. Colours from prior party affiliations may be used as well.

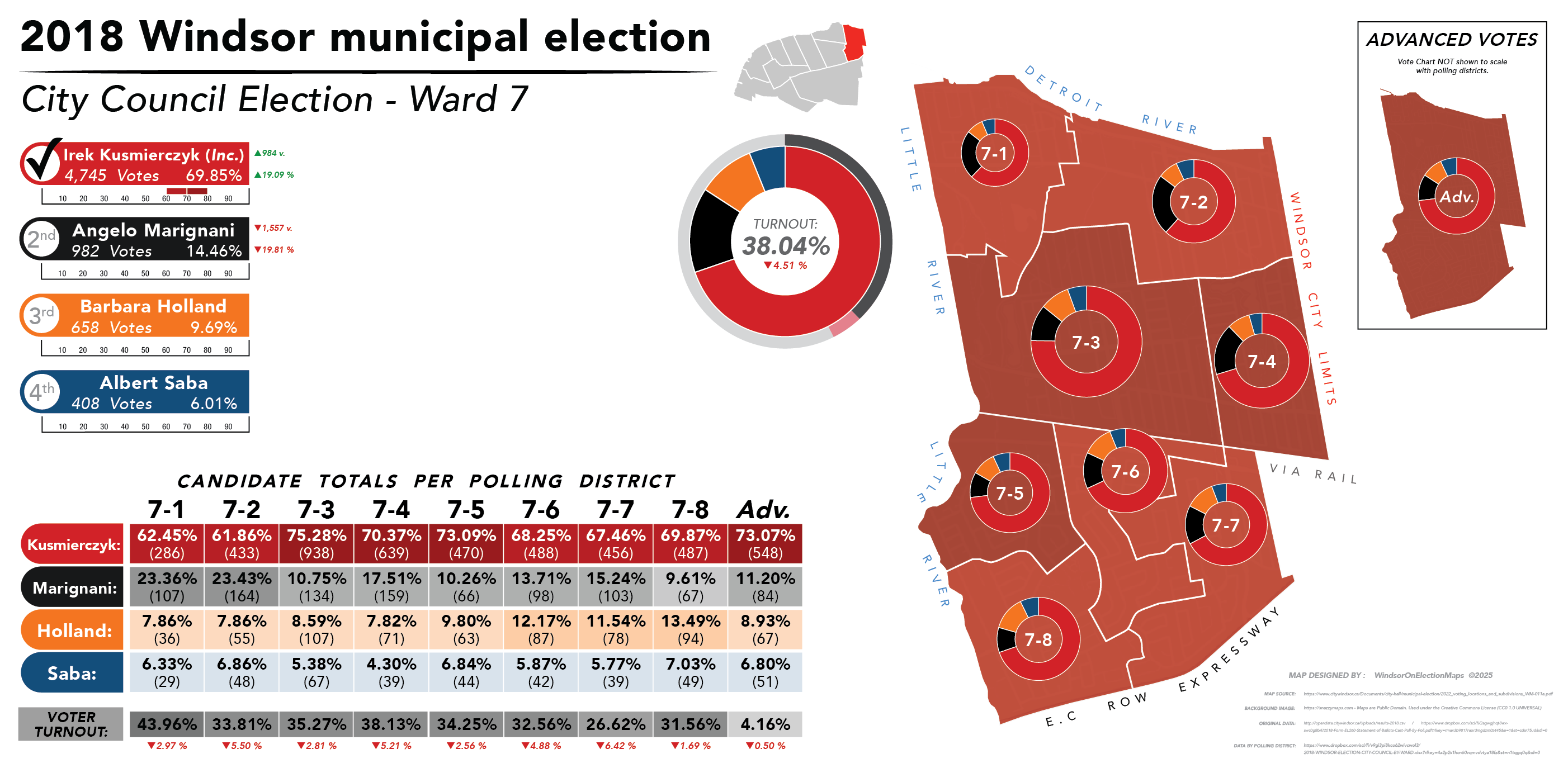
Results of the election in Ward 7 in the 2018 municipal election. Polling districts are shaded by which candidate gained the majority of the vote. Pie charts show the vote of all candidates and are scaled in size relative to the number of votes cast (except for the Advanced votes).

=== 2020 by-election ===
A by-election was held on October 5, 2020, to replace Kusmierczyk who was elected as the MP for Windsor—Tecumseh. The by-election was originally scheduled for April 27, but was postponed due to the COVID-19 pandemic in Ontario.

Candidate	Popular vote		
Candidate	Votes	%	±%
Jeewen Gill	1,105	19.69	--
Angelo Marignani	879	17.05	+2.59
Greg Lemay	781	15.15	--
Barbara Holland	426	8.26	-1.43
Michael Mallot	404	7.84	--
Igor Dzaic	396	7.68	--
Michelle Gajewski	378	7.33	--
Thérèse Papineau	311	6.03	--
Farah El-Hajj	266	5.16	--
Albert Saba	189	3.67	-2.34
Howard Weeks	78	1.51	--
Ernie "The Baconman" Lamont	33	0.64	--
Total valid votes	5,156	98.68	
Total rejected, unmarked and declined votes	69	1.32	
Turnout	5,225	27.75	-10.29
Eligible voters	18,589		
Note: Candidate campaign colours are based on the prominent colour used in campaign items (signs, literature, etc.) and are used as a visual differentiation between candidates. Colours from prior party affiliations may be used as well.

Candidates

- Igor Dzaic - part-time administrator and economics student at the University of Windsor. Campaigned on his connections to the Progressive Conservative Party of Ontario. Has come under fire for past "misogynistic, homophobic (and) transphobic" statements made on social media. Ran for the Catholic school board in 2014.
- Farah El-Hajj - constituency assistant for Windsor West New Democratic Party MP Brian Masse and Windsor West Ontario New Democratic Party MPP Lisa Gretzky.
- Michelle Gajewski - customs broker
- Jeewen Gill - real estate broker Ran for the Liberal Party of Canada nomination in Windsor—Tecumseh for the 2019 federal election.
- Barb Holland - business owner (The Holland Benefits Group); former Windsor-Essex Catholic District School Board trustee (2000–2018); ran in this ward in 2018.
- Ernie Lamont - salesman
- Greg Lemay - business owner (Alpha Pro Floor Care & Machine Repair)
- Michael Malott - Chrysler Canada employee; labour activist.
- Angelo Marignani - Works for Magna International, Materials Department. Has run in this ward in every election and by-election since its creation.
- Thérèse Papineau - Care worker; retired public servant (Toronto Police Service).
- Albert Saba - Employment Counsellor, Job Developer, College Professor & Community Organizer; Ran in this ward in 2018.
- Howard Weeks - Retired Son of former mayor Bert Weeks.

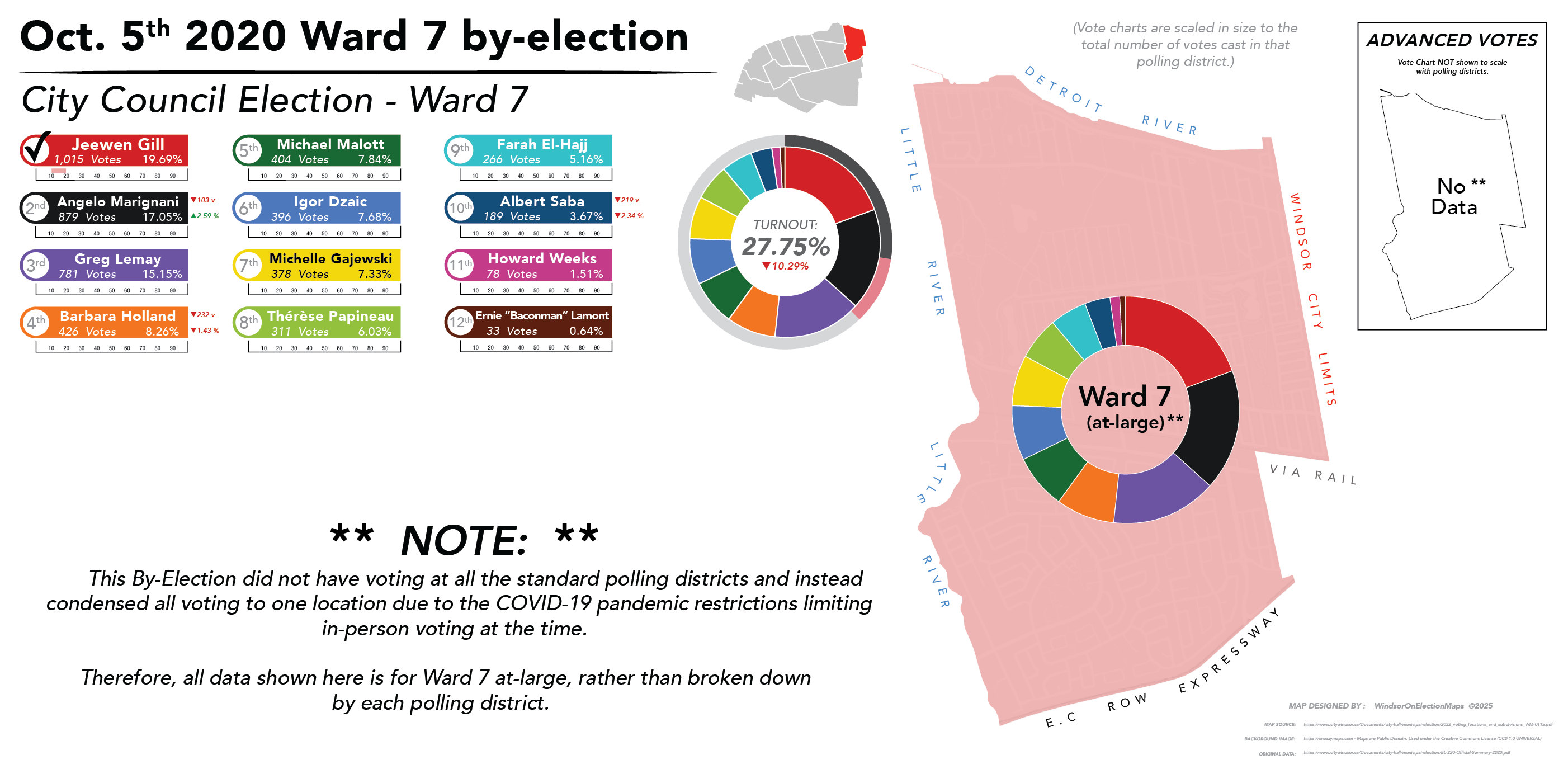
Results of the 2020 By-election in Ward 7.

=== 2022 ===
Candidate	Popular vote		
Candidate	Votes	%	±%
Angelo Marignani	2,678	36.75	+19.70
Greg Lemay	2,248	30.85	+15.70
Jeewen Gill (X)	1,983	25.98	+6.29
Sydney Brouillard-Coyle	243	3.33	--
Sophia Sevo	225	3.09	--
Total valid votes	7,287	99.22	
Total rejected, unmarked and declined votes	58	0.78	
Turnout (from 2020 by-election)	7,345	37.17	+9.42
Turnout (from 2018 election)	7,345	37.17	-0.87
Eligible voters	19,760		
Note: Candidate campaign colours are based on the prominent colour used in campaign items (signs, literature, etc.) and are used as a visual differentiation between candidates. Colours from prior party affiliations may be used as well.
Sources: City of Windsor

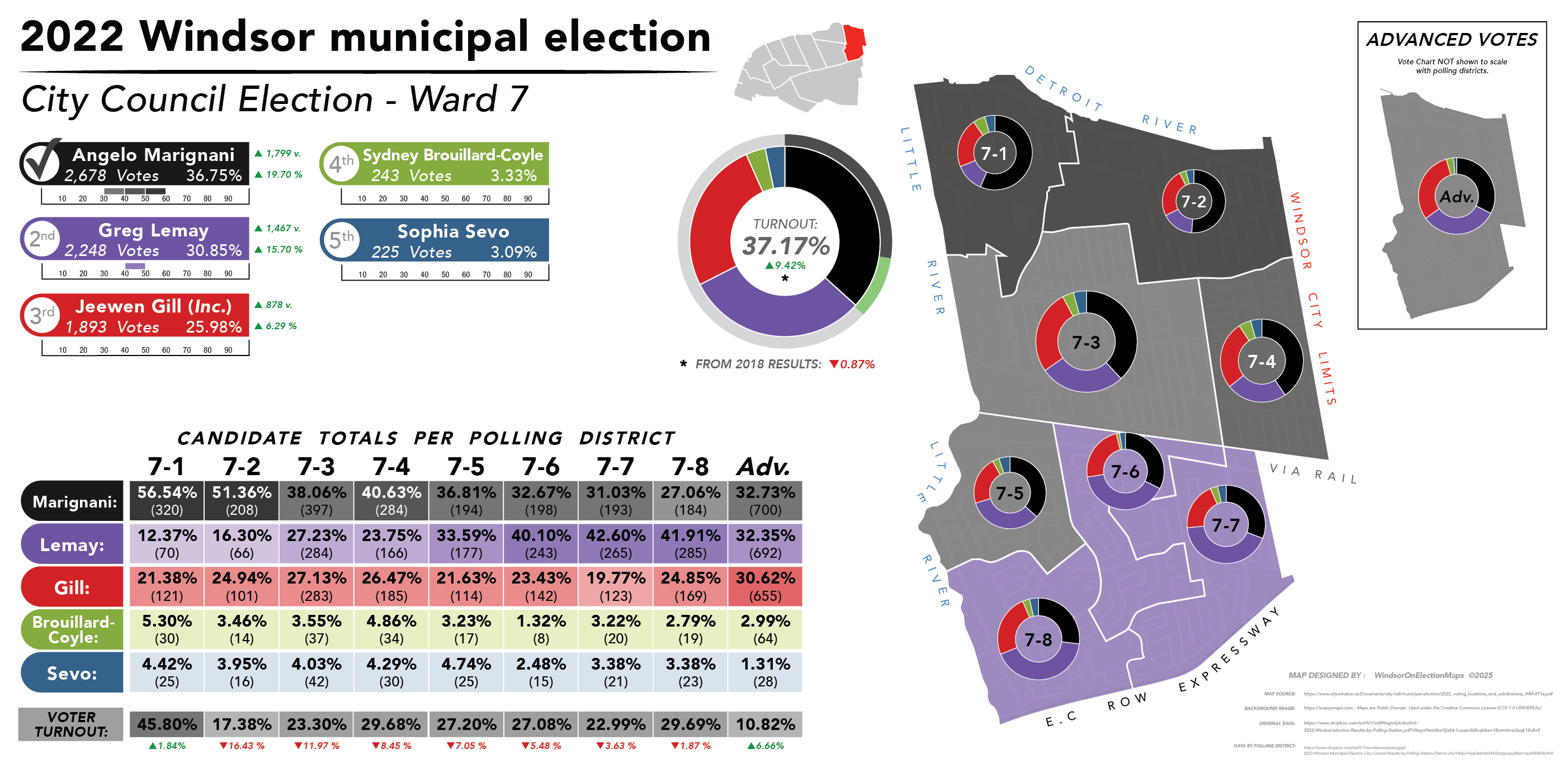
Results of the election in Ward 7 in the 2022 municipal election. Polling districts are shaded by which candidate gained the majority of the vote. Pie charts show the vote of all candidates and are scaled in size relative to the number of votes cast (except for the Advanced votes).

=== 2026 ===
Candidate	Popular vote		
Candidate	Votes	%	±%
To be announced	TBD	TBD	TBD
Total valid votes	TBD	TBD	
Total rejected, unmarked and declined votes	TBD	TBD	
Turnout	TBD	TBD	TBD
Eligible voters	TBD		
Note: Candidate campaign colours are based on the prominent colour used in campaign items (signs, literature, etc.) and are used as a visual differentiation between candidates. Colours from prior party affiliations may be used as well.
Sources: City of Windsor
