= 2010 Windsor municipal election =

- October 25, 2010
- Turnout: 46.28% (▲8.08 pp)
Candidate	Eddie Francis	Rick Limoges
Popular vote	39,384	28,354
Percentage	56.17%	40.44%
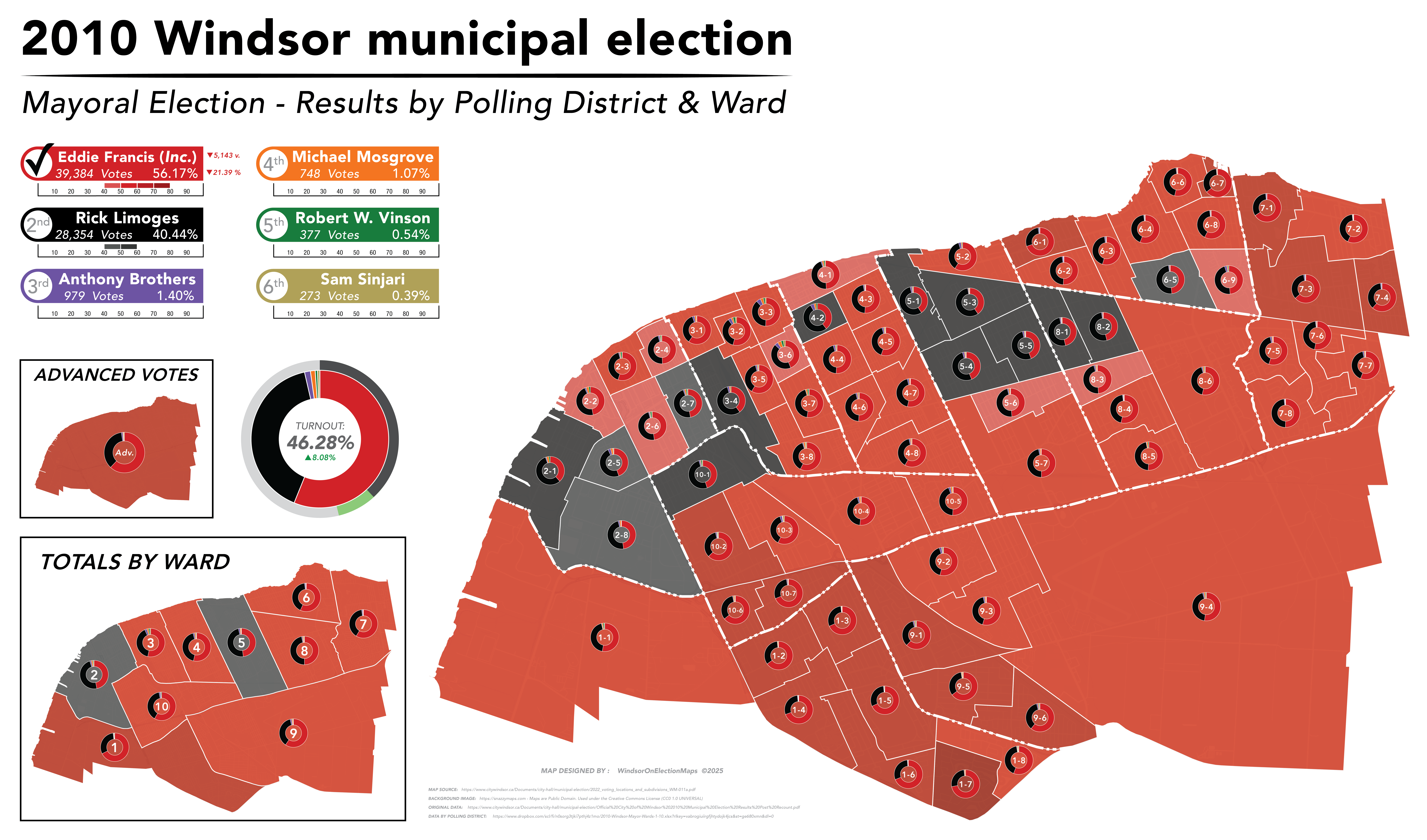
- Map showing the winning candidate's vote strength in each of the 10 wards and their respective polling districts. The districts shaded in Red voted a majority for Eddie Francis, and Black voted a majority for Rick Limoges. Pie Charts indicate the total vote of all candidates per Ward/polling district.
Mayor before election
Eddie Francis
Elected mayor
Eddie Francis

The 2010 Windsor municipal election occurred on October 25, 2010, to elect the Mayor of Windsor, Windsor City Council and the Greater Essex County District School Board, Windsor Essex Catholic District School Board, Conseil scolaire catholique Providence and Conseil scolaire Viamonde.

The election was held on the same day as elections in every other municipality in Ontario, as well as the elections in neighbouring towns in Essex County.

This was the first election held in Windsor after the passage of By-Law 133-2009 - which divided Windsor's 5 dual-member wards into 10 single-member wards.

== Mayor ==
Candidate	Popular vote		
Candidate	Votes	%	±%
Eddie Francis (X)	39,384	56.17	-21.39
Rick Limoges	28,354	40.44	--
Anthony Brothers	979	1.40	--
Michael Mosgrove	748	1.07	--
Robert W. Vinson	377	0.54	--
Sam Sinjari	273	0.39	--
Total valid votes	70,115	99.32	
Total rejected, unmarked and declined votes	482	0.68	
Turnout	70,597	46.28	+8.08
Eligible voters	152,557		
Note: Candidate campaign colours are based on the prominent colour used in campaign items (signs, literature, etc.) and are used as a visual differentiation between candidates. Colours from prior party affiliations may be used as well.

== City Council ==
=== Ward 1 ===
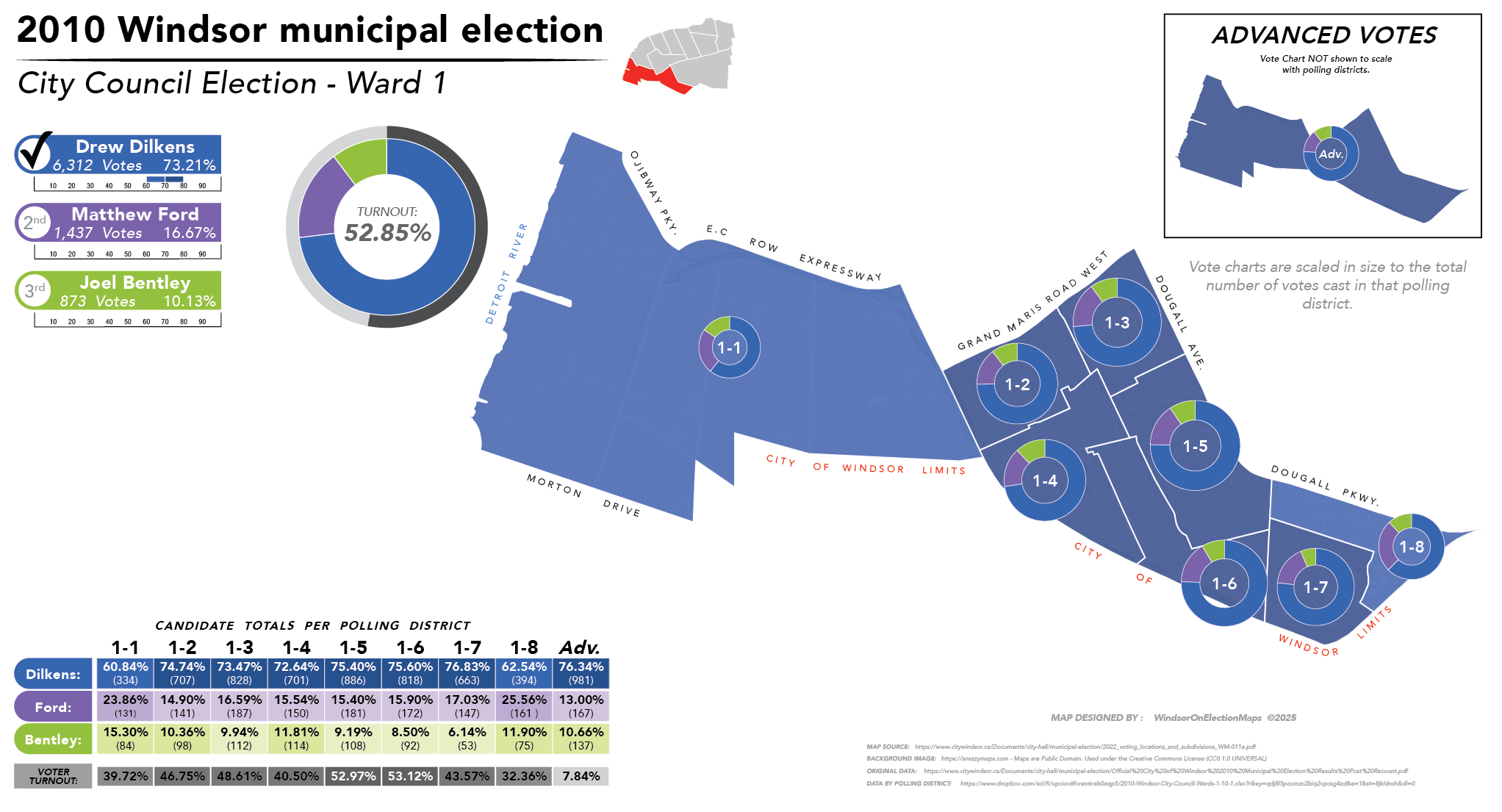
Results of the election in Ward 1. Polling districts are shaded by which candidate gained the majority of the vote.

Candidate	Popular vote	
Candidate	Votes	%
Drew Dilkens	6,312	73.21
Matt Ford	1,437	16.67
Joel Bentley	873	10.13
Total valid votes	8622	97.32
Total rejected, unmarked and declined votes	237	2.68
Turnout	8,859	52.85
Eligible voters	16,764	
Note: Candidate campaign colours are based on the prominent colour used in campaign items (signs, literature, etc.) and are used as a visual differentiation between candidates. Colours from prior party affiliations may be used as well.

=== Ward 2 ===
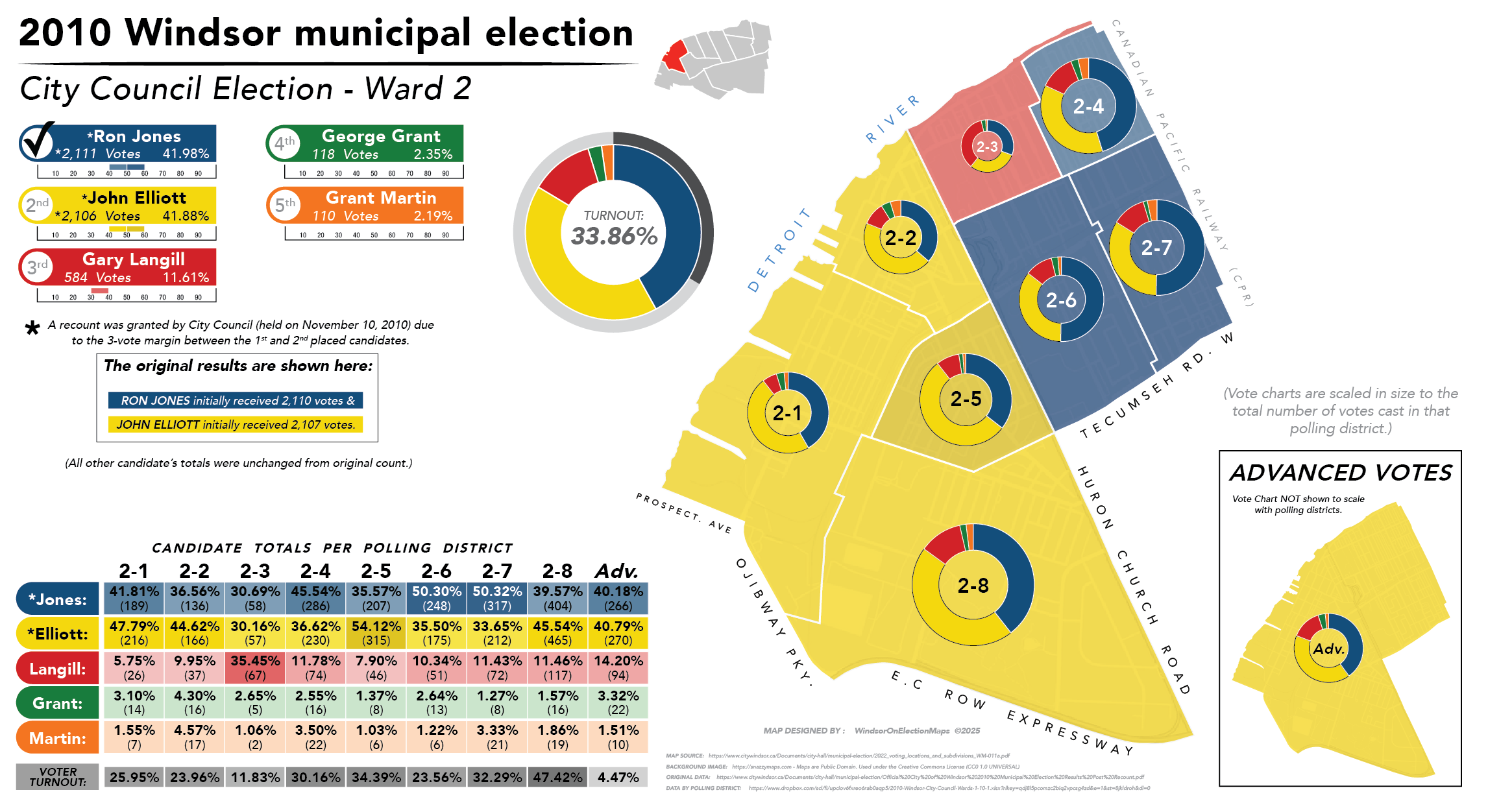
Results of the election in Ward 2. Polling districts are shaded by which candidate gained the majority of the vote.

After the election, runner-up candidate John Elliott requested a recount from City Council due to the three vote margin of victory between him and the winner Ron Jones. It was granted, and held on November 10, where it found that Ron Jones had received 2,111 votes and John Elliott had received 2,106 votes. All of the remaining candidates' vote totals remained unchanged from the initial count.

Candidate	Popular vote	
Candidate	Votes	%
Ron Jones	2,111	41.98
John Elliott	2,106	41.88
Gary Langril	584	11.61
George Grant	118	2.35
Grant Martin	110	2.19
Total valid votes	5,029	98.00
Total rejected, unmarked and declined votes	103	2.00
Turnout	5,132	33.86
Eligible voters	15,155	
Note: Candidate campaign colours are based on the prominent colour used in campaign items (signs, literature, etc.) and are used as a visual differentiation between candidates. Colours from prior party affiliations may be used as well.

Original results before the recount are shown here:

Candidate	Vote	%
Ron Jones	2,110*	41.98
John Elliott	2,107*	41.88
Gary Langril	584	11.61
George Grant	118	2.35
Grant Martin	110	2.19

=== Ward 3 ===
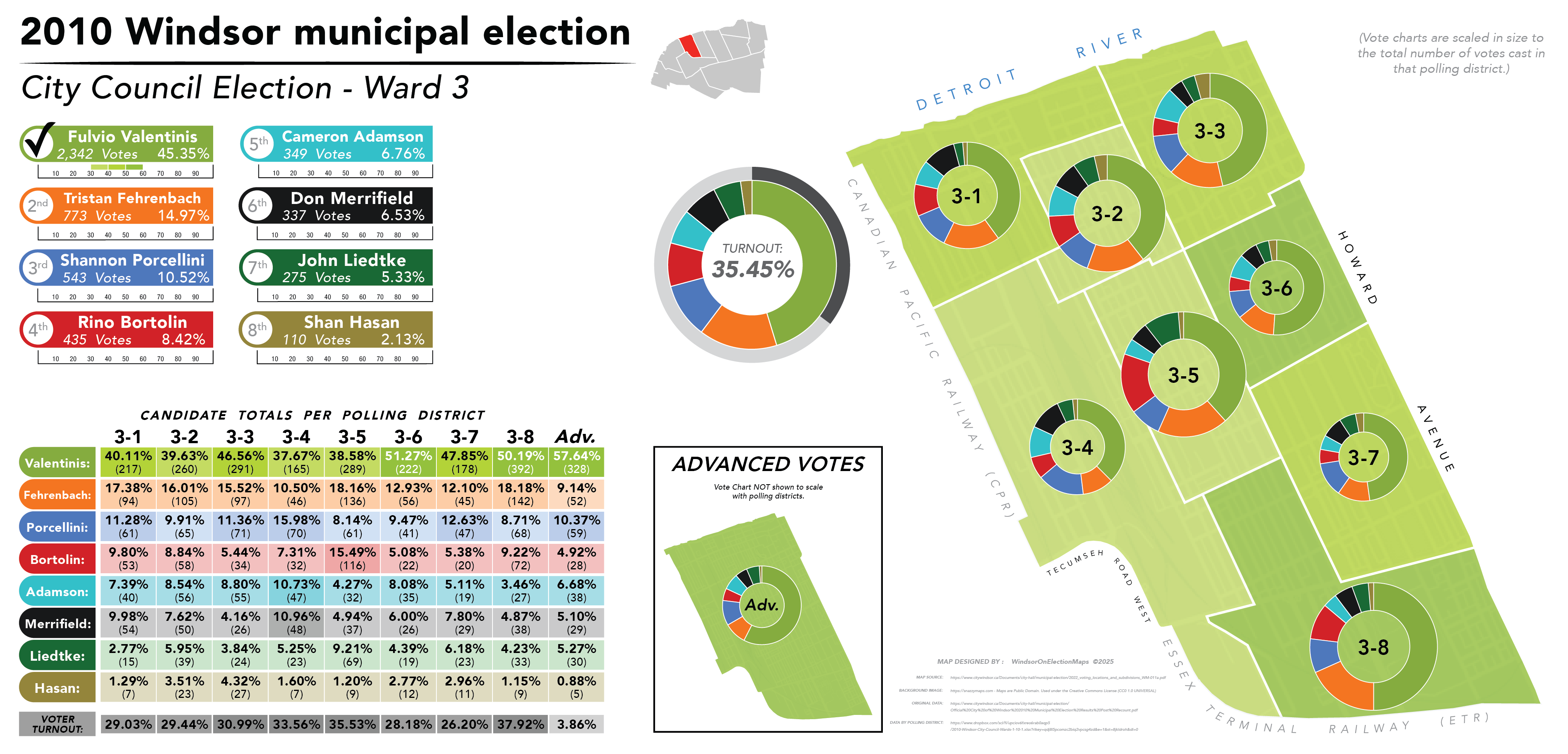
Results of the election in Ward 3. Polling districts are shaded by which candidate gained the majority of the vote.

Candidate	Popular vote	
Candidate	Votes	%
Fulvio Valentinis	2,342	45.35
Tristan Fehrenbach	773	14.97
Shannon Porcellini	543	10.52
Rino Bortolin	435	8.42
Cameron Adamson	349	6.76
Don Merrifield	337	6.53
Jon Liedtke	275	5.33
Shan Hasan	110	2.13
Total valid votes	5,164	96.40
Total rejected, unmarked and declined votes	193	3.60
Turnout	5,357	35.45
Eligible voters	15,112	
Note: Candidate campaign colours are based on the prominent colour used in campaign items (signs, literature, etc.) and are used as a visual differentiation between candidates. Colours from prior party affiliations may be used as well.

=== Ward 4 ===
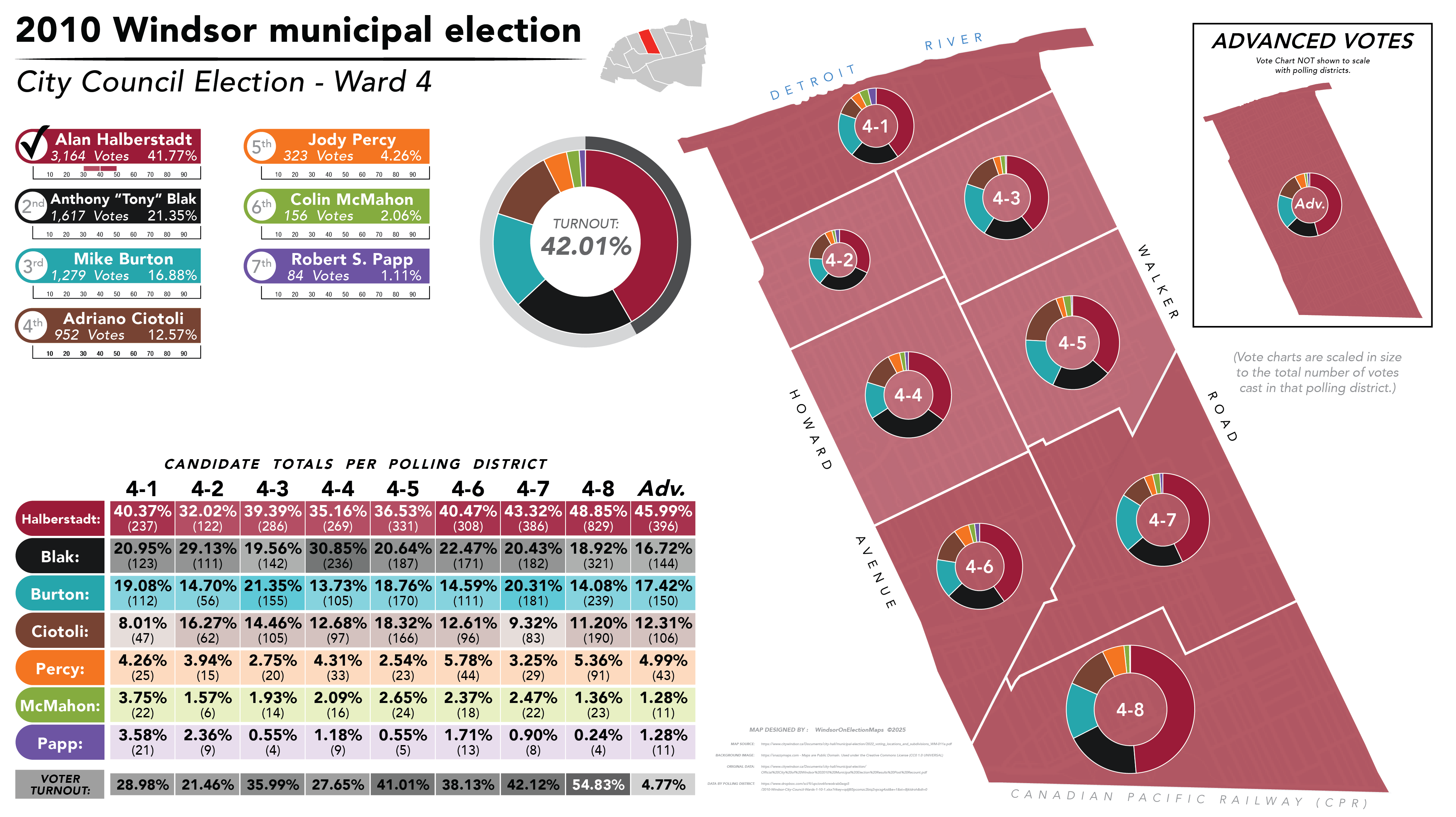
Results of the election in Ward 4. Polling districts are shaded by which candidate gained the majority of the vote.

Candidate	Popular vote	
Candidate	Votes	%
Alan Halberstadt	3,164	41.77
Anthony "Tony" Blak	1,617	21.35
Mike Burton	1,279	16.88
Adriano Ciotoli	952	12.57
Jody Percy	323	4.26
Colin McMahon	156	2.06
Robert S. Papp	84	1.11
Total valid votes	7,575	98.05
Total rejected, unmarked and declined votes	150	1.95
Turnout	7,725	42.01
Eligible voters	18,390	
Note: Candidate campaign colours are based on the prominent colour used in campaign items (signs, literature, etc.) and are used as a visual differentiation between candidates. Colours from prior party affiliations may be used as well.

=== Ward 5 ===
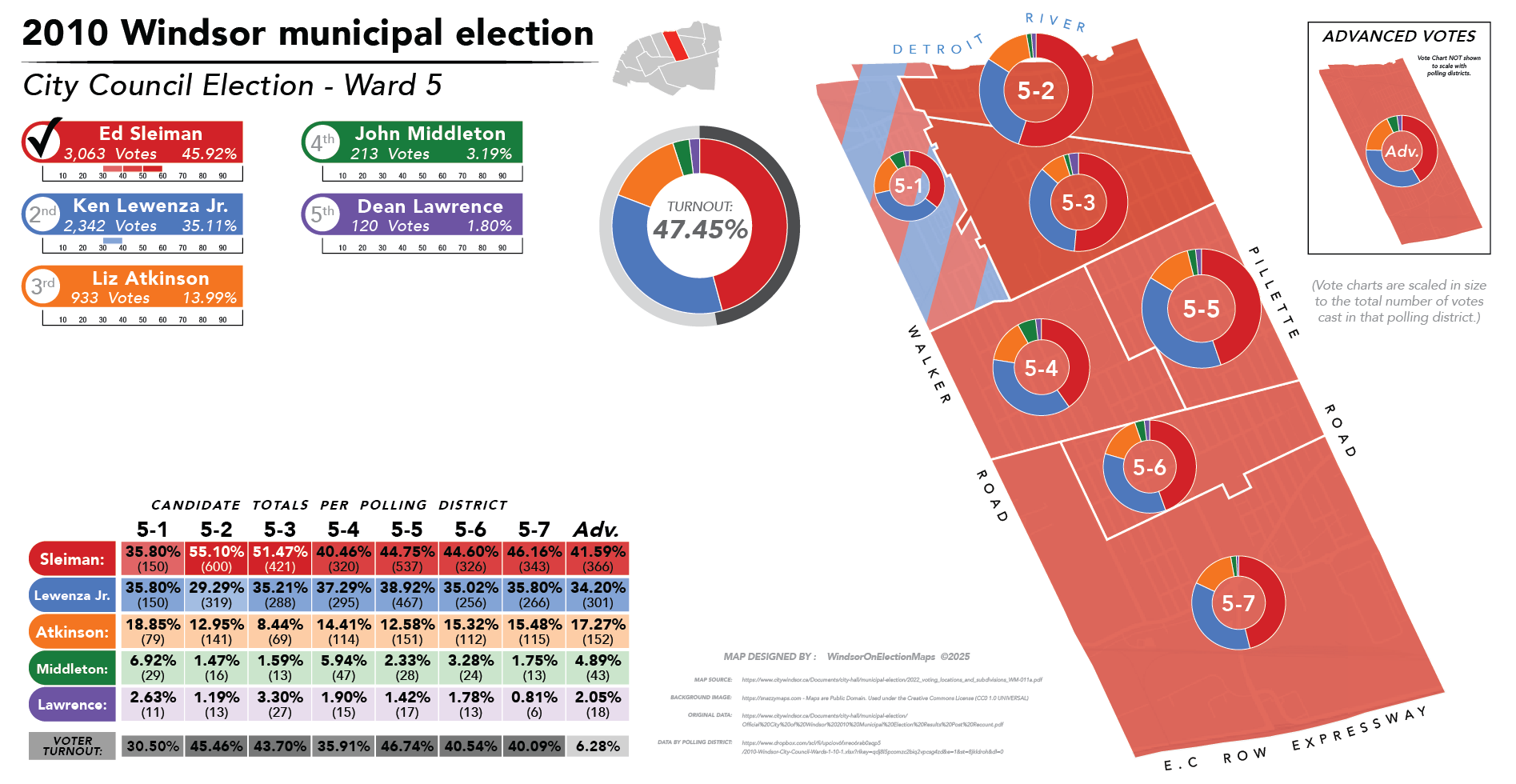
Results of the election in Ward 5. Polling districts are shaded by which candidate gained the majority of the vote.

Council Candidate	Vote	%
Ed Sleiman	3,063	45.92
Ken Lewenza	2,342	35.11
Liz Atkinson	933	13.99
John Middleton	213	3.19
Dean Lawrence	120	1.80

=== Ward 6 ===
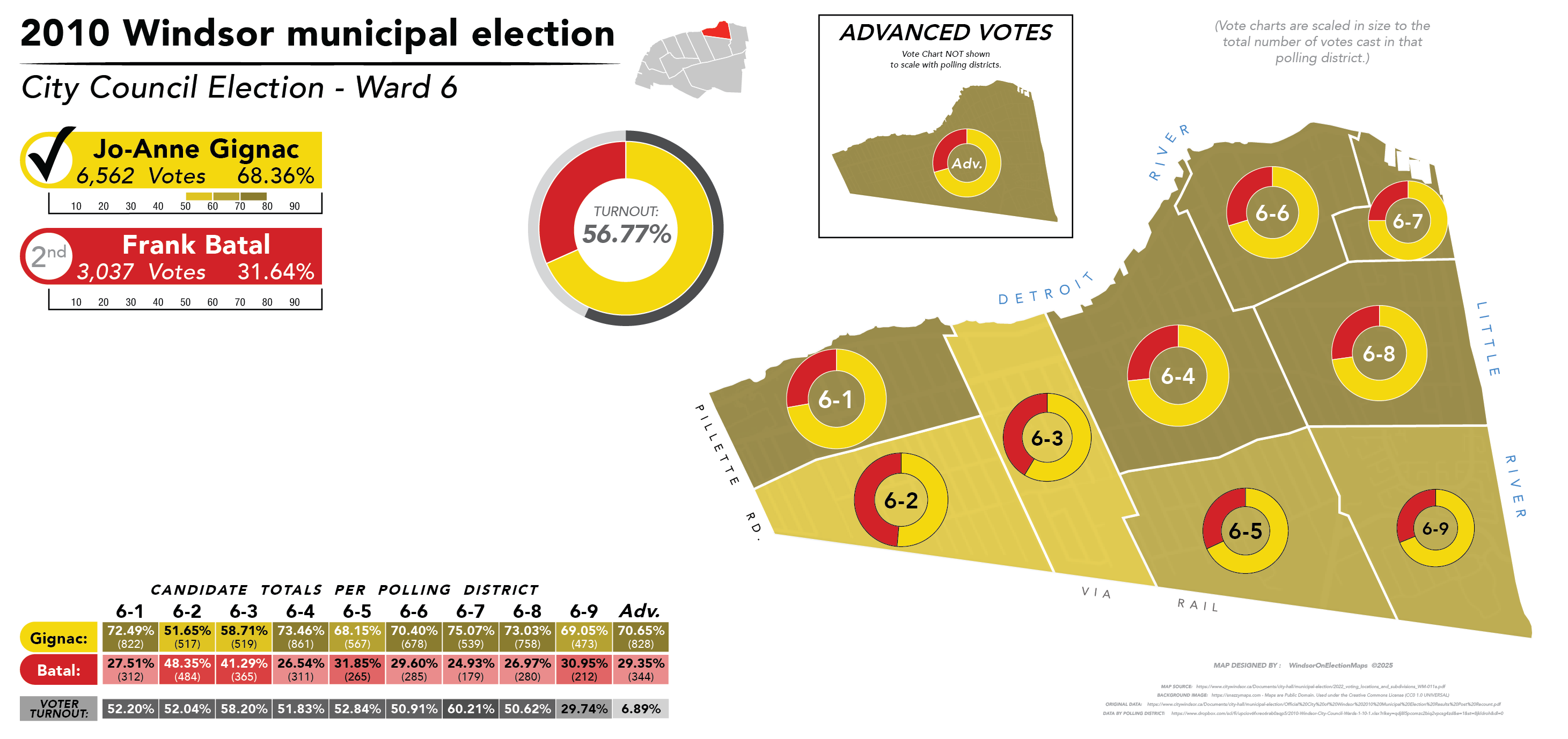
Results of the election in Ward 6. Polling districts are shaded by which candidate gained the majority of the vote.

Council Candidate	Vote	%
Jo-Anne Gignac	6,562	68.36
Frank Batal	3,037	31.64

=== Ward 7 ===
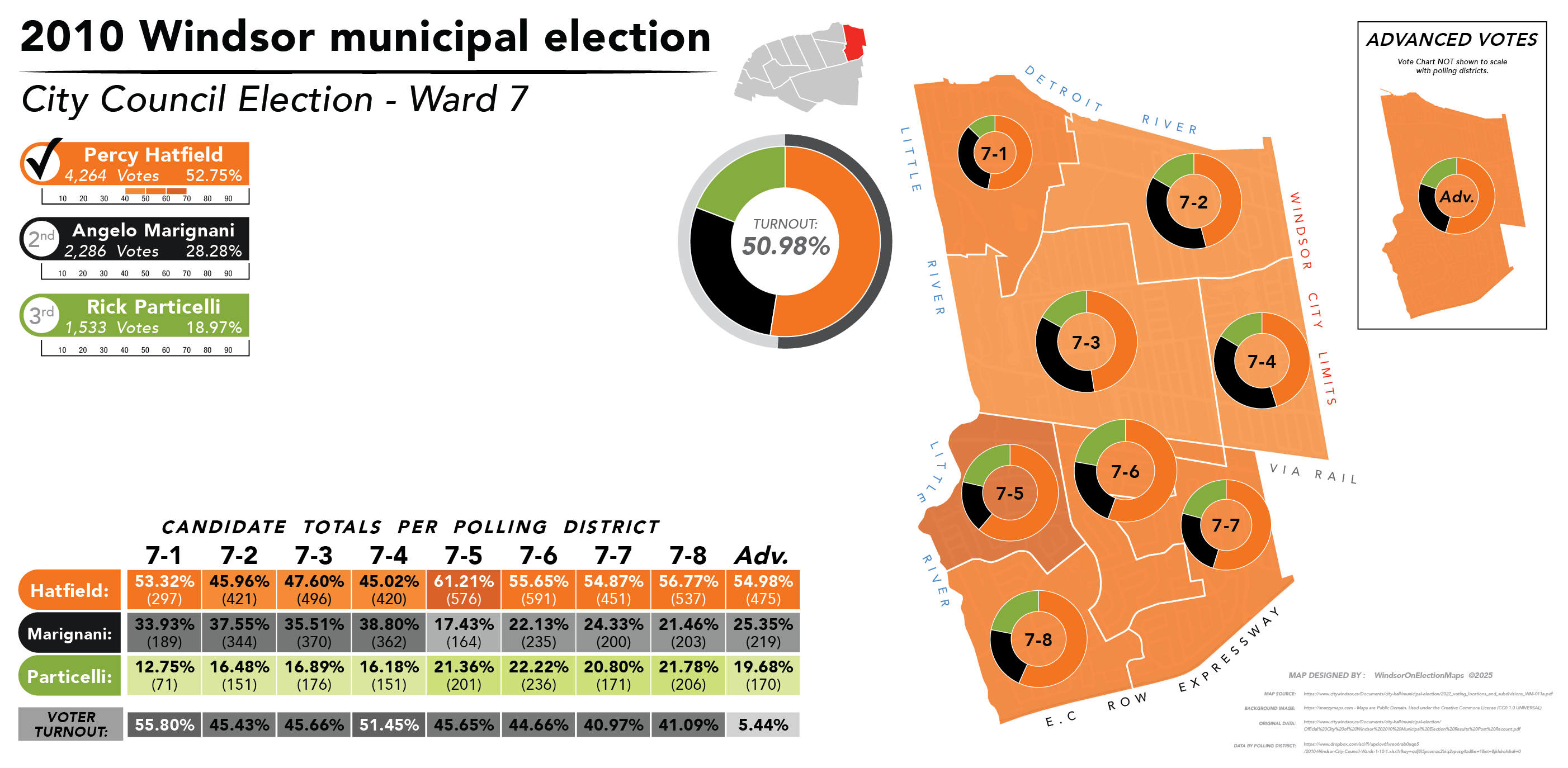
Results of the election in Ward 7. Polling districts are shaded by which candidate gained the majority of the vote.

Council Candidate	Vote	%
Percy Hatfield	4,264	52.75
Angelo Marignani	2,286	28.28
Rick Particelli	1,533	18.97

=== Ward 8 ===
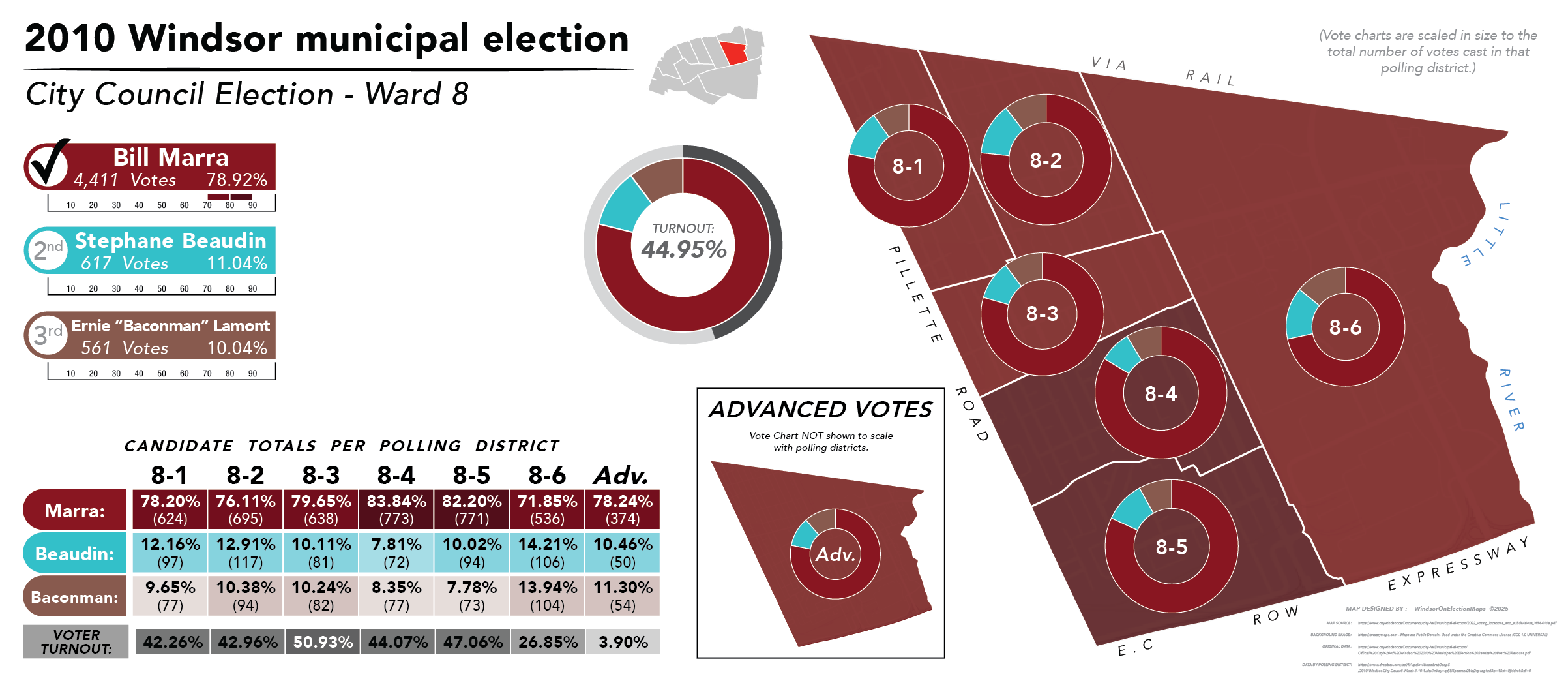
Results of the election in Ward 8. Polling districts are shaded by which candidate gained the majority of the vote.

Council Candidate	Vote	%
Bill Marra	4,411	78.92
Stephane Beaudin	617	11.04
Ernie "The Baconman" Lamont	561	10.04

=== Ward 9 ===
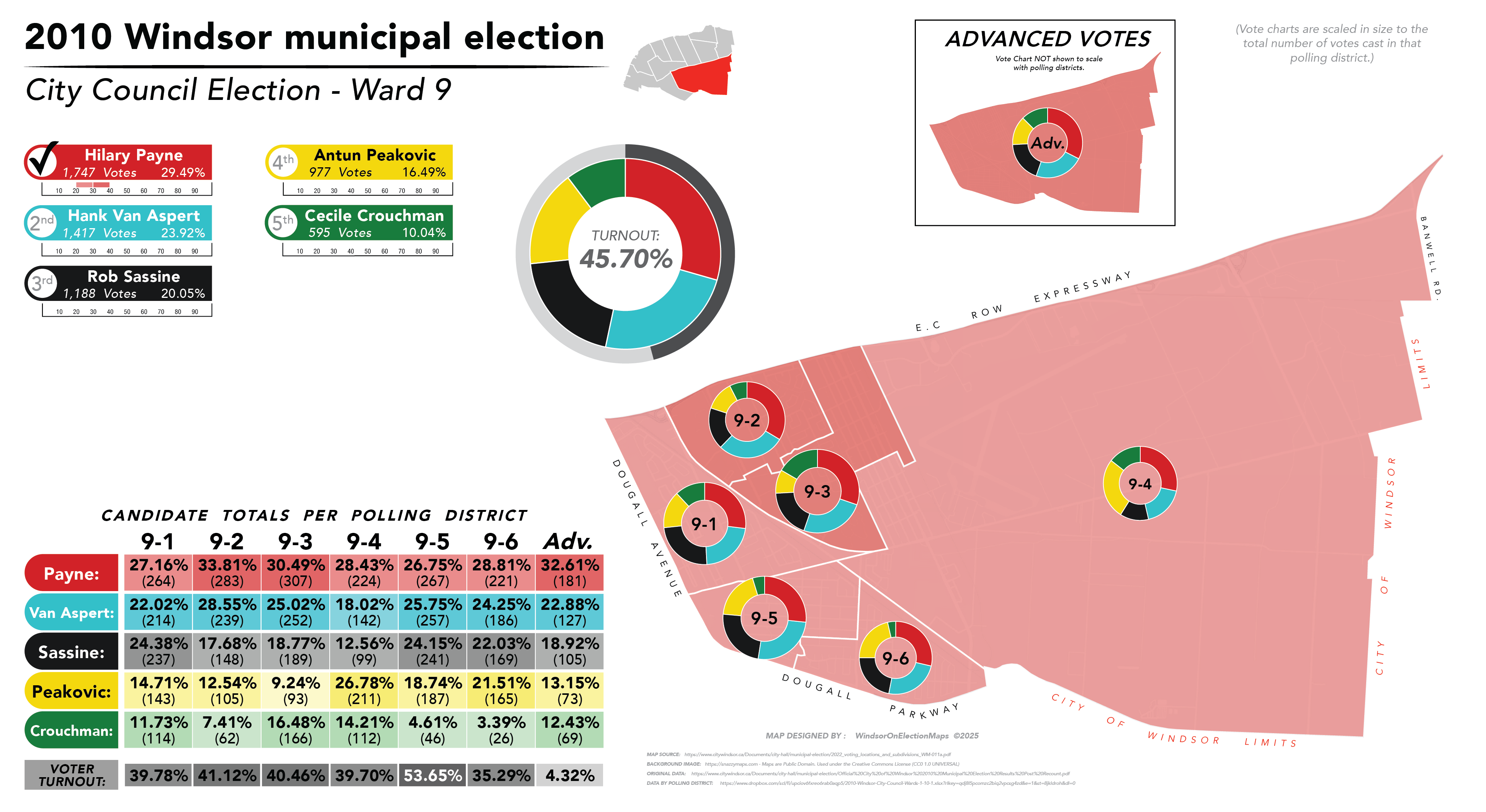
Results of the election in Ward 9. Polling districts are shaded by which candidate gained the majority of the vote.

Council Candidate	Vote	%
Hillary Payne	1,747	29.49
Hank Van Aspert	1,417	23.92
Rob Sassine	1,188	20.05
Antun Peakovic	977	16.49
Cecile Crouchman	595	10.04

=== Ward 10 ===
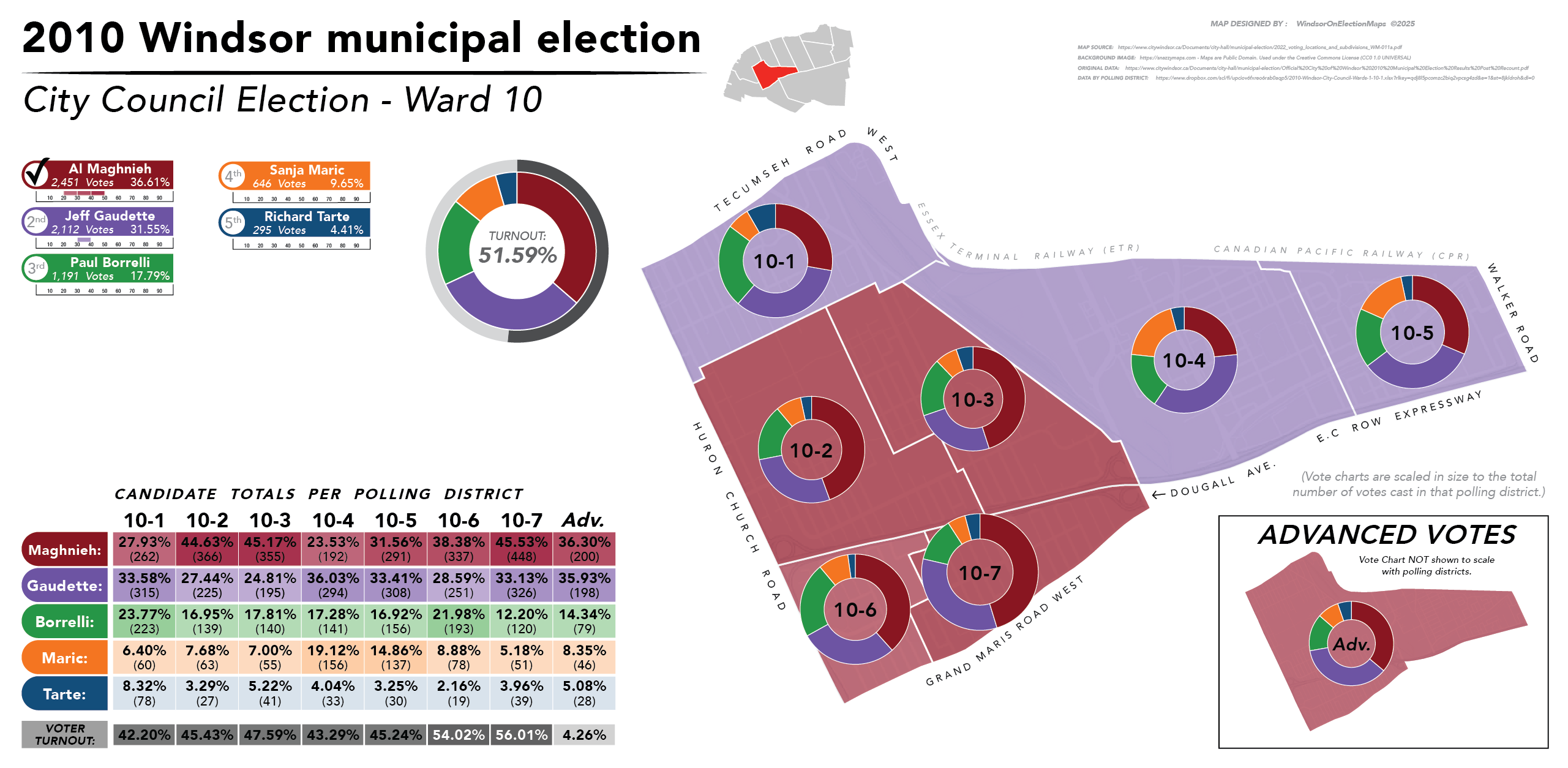
Results of the election in Ward 10. Polling districts are shaded by which candidate gained the majority of the vote.

Council Candidate	Vote	%
Al Maghnieh	2,451	36.61
Jeff Gaudette	2,112	31.55
Paul Borrelli	1,191	17.79
Sanja Maric	646	9.65
Richard Tarte	295	4.41
