= David Croll =

Canadian politician

The Honourable David Croll PC QC

Canadian Senator from Ontario
- In office 1955–1991
- Appointed by: Louis St. Laurent

Member of Parliament for Spadina
- In office 1945–1955
- Preceded by: Samuel Factor
- Succeeded by: Charles Edward Rea

Member of the Ontario Provincial Parliament for Windsor—Walkerville
- In office 1934–1943
- Preceded by: Frank Worthington Wilson (Windsor East)
- Succeeded by: William Charles Riggs

18th & 21st Mayor of Windsor
- In office 1931–1934
- Preceded by: Cecil E. Jackson
- Succeeded by: George Bennett
- In office 1939–1940
- Preceded by: Ernest S. Wigle
- Succeeded by: Arthur Reaume

Personal details
- Born: Davud Avrum Croll; March 12, 1900 Moscow, Russian Empire
- Died: June 11, 1991 (aged 91) Ottawa, Ontario, Canada
- Resting place: Beth Tzedec Memorial Park
- Party: Liberal
- Other political affiliations: Ontario Liberal Party
- Cabinet: Provincial: Minister of Labour (1935–1937); Minister of Municipal Affairs (1934–1937); Minister of Public Welfare (1934–1937)
- Committees: Federal: Chair, Special Committee on Retirement Age Policies; Chair, Special Committee on Poverty; Chair, Special Committee on Aging

David Arnold Croll, PC QC (born Davud Avrum Croll; March 12, 1900 – June 11, 1991) was a Canadian politician. He served twice as the mayor of Windsor, Ontario. He entered provincial politics in the 1930s, and served as minister of public works and municipal affairs in the Mitch Hepburn government. He won election to the House of Commons in 1945. In 1955 he was appointed to the Senate, becoming the first Jewish Senator. He served as a senator until his death on June 11, 1991, a few hours after what would be his last Senate sitting.

== Early life ==
Croll was born in Moscow, Russia and was brought to Canada with his family as a young boy, at which point his name was anglicized. Croll became a lawyer and entered politics serving as mayor of Windsor, Ontario from 1931 to 1934 during the worst days of the Great Depression. He made his reputation as a social reformer when he insisted the city go into deficit in order to provide relief programs for the unemployed and destitute.

== Provincial politics ==
Croll won a seat in the Legislative Assembly of Ontario as a Liberal Member of the Legislative Assembly (MLA) for Windsor—Walkerville in the 1934 election that brought the Liberals to power under the leadership of Mitchell Hepburn. Croll became Canada's first Jewish cabinet minister when he became Minister of Public Welfare. He later also added the portfolios of Minister of Municipal Affairs and Minister of Labour. He and Attorney-General Arthur Roebuck broke with Hepburn over the Premier's opposition to the United Auto Workers strike against General Motors in Oshawa in 1937, and resigned from cabinet saying "I would rather walk with the workers than ride with General Motors." He remained a provincial Liberal backbencher until 1943, as well as serving again as Mayor of Windsor.

== Military service ==
He served in the Canadian Army during the Second World War, enlisting as a Private in the Essex Scottish Regiment and rising in rank to lieutenant-colonel.

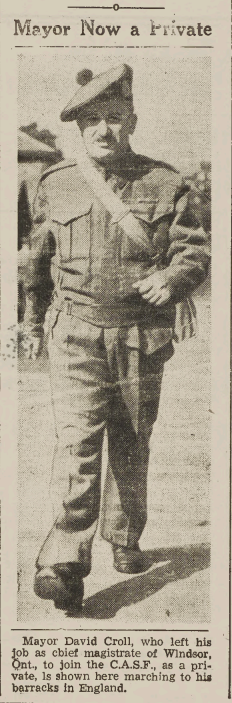
News clipping of David Croll in England in 1940

== Federal politics ==
He was recruited by the Liberal Party of Canada to contest the Toronto riding of Spadina in the 1945 federal election. The Liberals feared that Tim Buck, leader of the communist Labor-Progressive Party was poised to win the riding. The popular Croll was seen as the only Liberal who could defeat him. After Croll was nominated, Buck instead ran in a neighbouring riding, leaving Sam Carr to be the LPP's candidate. Croll handily won a seat in the House of Commons, becoming Spadina's Member of Parliament (MP) and Tory Toronto's sole Liberal MP. He was re-elected in the 1949 and 1953 elections.

Despite being regarded as one of the most talented Liberal MPs and, until 1950, the only Liberal MP from Toronto, Croll was never summoned to the Canadian Cabinet where he would have become the first Jewish federal cabinet minister. Instead, he was appointed to the Senate in 1955, becoming Canada's first Jewish senator. In the early 1950s, Croll drew attention when he attacked the early release of Nazi war criminals.

"We are still dealing with a people who are undemocratic and unrepentant, who consider themselves unfortunate and whose chief objective at present is to figure out the winning side and get on it. Fears of the rearming of Germany were not allayed when we read of the reappearance on the present scene of left-over and warmed-up Nazi generals and some of the manifestations of Fascism. Ex-German generals, former Nazi leaders and war criminals are starting to roll off the Allied amnesty assembly lines."

Croll was the author of the influential 1971 "Report of the Special Senate Committee on Poverty" which began with the words "the poor do not choose poverty. It is at once their affliction and our national shame. The children of the poor (and there are many) are the most helpless victims of all, and find even less hope in a society where welfare systems from the very beginning destroys their chances of a better life." The report moved the Trudeau government to triple family allowances in 1973 and institute the Child Tax Credit in 1978. Aside from his work on poverty, he was also responsible for Senate reports on aging. In 1990 in recognition of his contributions, he was sworn into the Queen's Privy Council for Canada, an honour usually given only to federal cabinet ministers.

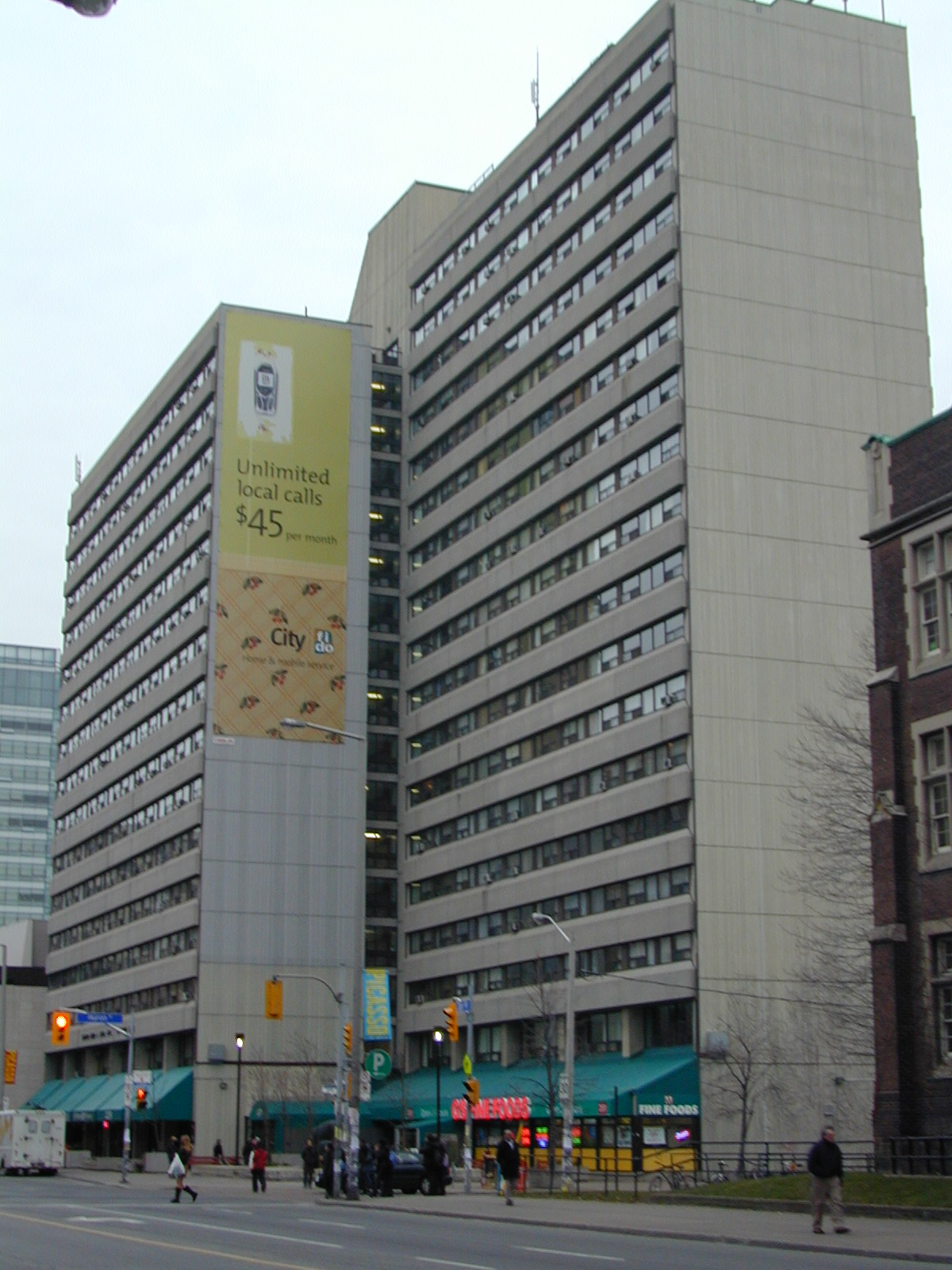
Former Rochdale College renamed by Metro Housing Corporation in 1978 as the Senator David A. Croll Apartments.

He remained an active senator until his death, even taking his seat in the "Red Chamber" a few hours before his death. He died of heart failure in the Château Laurier Hotel, a few hours after attending an afternoon Senate session on June 11, 1991. At the time, he was the oldest serving senator, as he was appointed at a time when appointments to the Senate were for life.

In his honour, the Senator David A. Croll Apartments, a seniors' residence in Toronto was named after him. The irony is that the building was originally the focus of Toronto's late 1960s youth counterculture, infamous Rochdale College, built by Campus Co-operative Student Residences (Campus Co-op) in 1968 as a student co-operative residence. The building was selected, as a pilot project, for installing Canada's first rooftop combined heat and power system.

== Archives ==
There is a David Arnold Croll fonds at Library and Archives Canada.
