= List of mayors of Windsor, Ontario =

This is a list of mayors of Windsor, Ontario.

== Reeve of the Village of Windsor ==
- S.S. MacDonell - 1851 - 1858

== Mayors of the Town of Windsor ==
- S.S. MacDonell - 1858
- James Dougall - 1859 - 1861
- Mark Richards - 1862 - 1863
- S.S. MacDonell - 1864 - 1867
- James Dougall - 1867 - 1869
- Donald Cameron - 1870 - 1874
- William Scott - 1875
- Robert L. McGregor - 1876
- Charles R. Horne - 1877 - 1879
- John Coventry - 1880 - 1882
- Francis Cleary - 1883 - 1885
- James H. Beattie - 1886 - 1888
- Michael Tworney - 1889
- Solomon White - 1890
- Oscar E. Fleming - 1891

== Mayors of the City of Windsor ==
- Oscar E. Fleming - 1892 - 1893
- James H. Beattie - 1894
- D. Willis Mason - 1895 - 1896
- John Davis - 1897 - 1901
- James F. Smythe - 1902
- John W. Drake - 1903 - 1904
- Ernest S. Wigle - 1905 - 1909
- John W. Hanna - 1910 - 1911
- James H. Shepard - 1912
- Henry Clay - 1913
- Frederick L. Howell - 1914
- Arthur W. Jackson - 1915 - 1916
- Charles R. Tuson - 1917 - 1918
- E. Blake Winter - 1919 - 1920
- Herbert W. Wilson - 1921 - 1923
- Frank J. Mitchell - 1924 - 1926
- Cecil E. Jackson - 1927 - 1930
- David Croll - 1931 - 1934
- George Bennett - 1935 - 1936
- Ernest S. Wigle - 1937 - 1938
- David Croll - 1939 - 1940
- Arthur Reaume - 1941 - 1954
- Thomas R. Brophey - 1950
- Michael Patrick - 1955 - 1964
- John Wheelton - 1965 - 1969
- W.C. Riggs - 1969
- Frank Wansbrough - 1970 - 1974
- Bert Weeks - 1975 - 1982
- Elizabeth Kishkon - 1983 - 1985
- David Burr - 1986 - 1988
- John Millson - 1989 - 1991
- Michael D. Hurst - 1992 - 2003
- Eddie Francis - 2003 - 2014
- Drew Dilkens - 2014 - 2026
- Fred Francis - 2026 - present
