= William Riggs =

Canadian politician

Bill Riggs

26th Mayor of Windsor
- In office 1969–1969
- Preceded by: John Wheelton
- Succeeded by: Frank Wansbrough

Ontario MPP
- In office 1943–1945
- Preceded by: David Croll
- Succeeded by: M.C. Davies
- Constituency: Windsor—Walkerville

Personal details
- Born: September 21, 1896 Bournemouth, England
- Died: December 20, 1973 (aged 77) Windsor, Ontario, Canada
- Party: CCF
- Spouse: Gladys
- Children: 4
- Occupation: Newspaper printer

William Charles Riggs (September 21, 1896 – December 20, 1973) was a politician in Ontario, Canada. He was a CCF member of the Legislative Assembly of Ontario from 1943 to 1945 who represented the southwestern Ontario riding of Windsor—Walkerville. He was a long time municipal councillor and he briefly served as Mayor of Windsor in 1969.

== Background ==
Riggs was born in 1896 in Bournemouth, England, but moved to Belleville, Ontario, where he was educated. He joined the Canadian Field Artillery in 1915, and spent nearly three years in France during World War I. Riggs trained as a printer in Belleville. Riggs moved to Windsor in 1921, where he worked for 42 years as a linotype printer at the Windsor Star, and retired in 1961. He was highly active as a trade unionist, holding many offices within the Windsor Typographical Union and the Windsor District Trades and Labor Council. Riggs was one of the first members of Ontario's Labor Party in the 1930s. In 1935, he accepted his first public position was on the Windsor Library Board.

Riggs was married to Gladys and had two sons and two daughters. An apartment building in East Windsor is named after him: Riggs Manor at 4365 Wyandotte Street East.

== Provincial politics ==
Riggs was elected in a CCF sweep in 1943, defeating the Liberal candidate, David Croll. As an MPP, he served on several Legislative Committees including Printing, Game and Fish, Municipal Law, Education, and Labour. He lost his seat in 1945 to the Progressive Conservative candidate Rev. M.C. Davies. He was again selected as the CCF candidate for the Windsor-Walkerville riding in the 1948 Ontario election, but lost again to Davies. He subsequently ran for the CCF in the 1949 federal election in Essex East against cabinet minister Paul Martin, Sr. In 1964 he finished second in a provincial election in the riding of Windsor-Sandwich.

== Municipal politics ==
In the 1940s, he was defeated in his first election for alderman in Windsor's Ward 4. He was elected as alderman for Ward Three in Windsor in 1946 and was acclaimed in 1948 and 1950. He was defeated in 1952 and 1954 elections for the Board of Control, but was re-elected as alderman in 1956, a position he held for the following 13 years.

When John Wheelton resigned as mayor of Windsor in 1969, Riggs replaced him for a period of five months. Four alderman received two votes each during the city council vote for a replacement. Riggs won the job by drawing a queen from a pack of cards, the method used to break the tie. He was the first mayor to lead the Windsor Santa Claus Parade. He was replaced by Frank Wansbrough at the beginning of 1970.
