= Nadine Deleury =

- Nadine Deleury (Photograph By Candace DeLattre)

Background information
- Origin: France
- Genres: Chamber Music; Classical Music
- Website: http://www.scarabclub.org/ChamberMusic

Nadine Deleury is a cellist who was born in northern France. A student of André Navarra, she studied music at the Paris Conservatory. When in Brazil, she met Aldo Parisot during her participation in a cello master class, and she accepted his invitation to study under his direction at Yale University, where she received her master's degree. Deleury took up residence in Metropolitan Detroit in 1983, and ascended to principal cellist with the orchestra of the Michigan Opera Theatre. She continues teaching music, a member of the faculty at Oakland University, and she shares the role of co-artistic director of Chamber Music at the Scarab Club with Velda Kelly.

Deleury initiated a chamber opera project called Pat & Emilia, about Pat Sturn, a prominent photographer, and Emilia Cundari, opera soprano who eventually performed with the Metropolitan Opera. The project grew from a conversation Deleury had with a writer/poet laureate from The Windsor Star, Marty Gervais. Deleury and Sturn were friends during Sturn's final years. The opera was performed by Deleury and others in 2015 and in 2018, at which time additional music was added to the production.

Deleury is also involved in a program assisting Syrian refugee families in Canada with integration into society. She befriended a family in 2016, providing emotional support and friendship. She retired from her position of principal cellist of the Michigan Opera Theatre orchestra on May 19, 2019.
