= George Bennett (Ontario politician) =

Canadian politician

Ontario MPP
- In office 1943–1945
- Preceded by: James Clark
- Succeeded by: William Griesinger
- Constituency: Windsor—Sandwich

Personal details
- Born: March 10, 1887 England
- Died: February 29, 1948 (aged 60) Windsor, Ontario
- Party: CCF
- Spouse: Hannah Elizabeth Hackney (m. 1910)

George Bennett (March 10, 1887 - February 29, 1948) was the 19th Mayor of the City of Windsor and a Member of Provincial Parliament in Legislative Assembly of Ontario from 1943 to 1945. He represented the riding of Windsor—Sandwich for the Co-operative Commonwealth Federation (CCF).

Bennett's time as a mayor was brief, from 1935 to 1936. He was preceded by David Croll and succeeded by Ernest S. Wigle.

Bennett was elected in a surprise sweep by the CCF and Ted Jolliffe in 1943, where his party went from no seats to 34. He served on several Legislative Committees including Public Accounts, Municipal Law, and Game and Fish. He lost his seat in 1945, along with many of his fellow CCF MPP's. Windsor-Sandwich would not be represented by a social democrat until 1967 when Hugh Peacock was elected.

In 1910 he married Hannah Elizabeth Hackney. He died in Windsor, Ontario at the age of 60.
