= Michael Wray =

Michael Wray may refer to:

- Michael H. Wray (born 1967), Democratic politician from North Carolina
- the winner of Hell's Kitchen (U.S. season 1)

== See also ==
- Mike Ray (1936–2021), Canadian politician
- Mike Rae (born 1951), American football quarterback
