= Windsor—Tecumseh =

Windsor—Tecumseh could refer to:

- Windsor—Tecumseh (federal electoral district)
- Windsor—Tecumseh (provincial electoral district)
