= John Wheelton =

25th Mayor of Windsor
- In office 1965–1969
- Preceded by: Michael Patrick
- Succeeded by: William Riggs

Personal details
- Born: April 27, 1920 Windsor, Ontario
- Died: July 4, 1976 (aged 56) near Petrolia, Ontario
- Education: Queen's University; Osgoode Hall

Wilfred John Wheelton (April 27, 1920 – July 4, 1976) was the 25th mayor of the city of Windsor, Ontario, Canada, from 1965 to 1969.

Before becoming mayor, Wheelton was a lawyer. Following his years as mayor, he was an Ontario Provincial Court judge. He was an avid gardener who enjoyed the outdoors. Judge Wheelton, his wife, Margaret, and son, Robert, died in a car accident in 1976 while returning to their home in Windsor from their summer cottage at Invercairn Beach near Sarnia.
