= Bert Weeks =

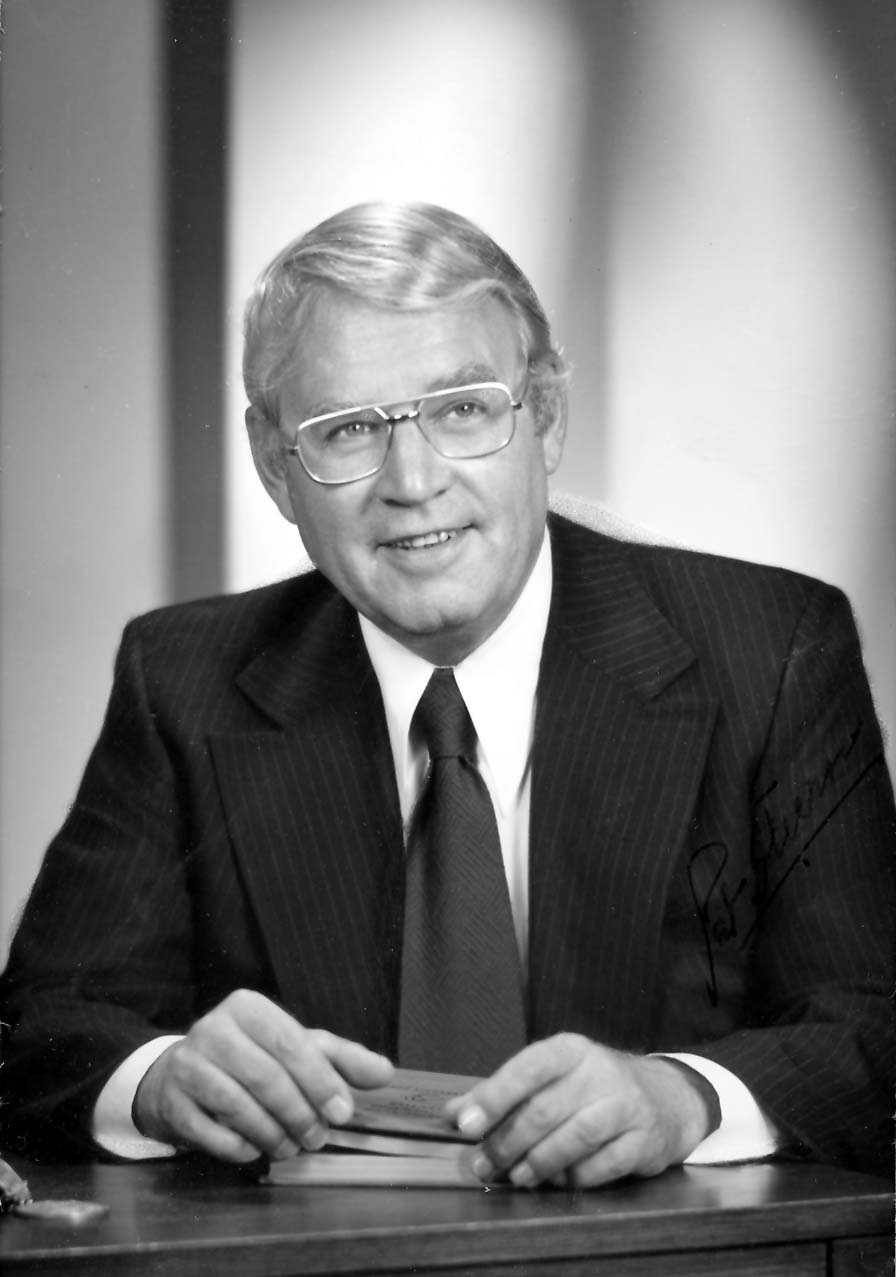
- Portrait of Mayor Bert Weeks by Windsor photographer Pat Sturn

28th Mayor of Windsor
- In office 1975–1982
- Preceded by: Frank Wansbrough
- Succeeded by: Elizabeth Kishkon
- Constituency: Windsor, Ontario

Personal details
- Born: July 1, 1917 Montreal, Quebec
- Died: December 10, 1990 (aged 73) Windsor, Ontario
- Party: NDP
- Spouse(s): Sheila Ruth Marshall Weeks; Sheelagh Beneteau Weeks
- Children: 6 and 2 step children
- Profession: politician, business owner, watch repairman

Albert Howard Weeks (July 1, 1917 – December 10, 1990) was the 28th mayor of the city of Windsor, Ontario, Canada, from 1975 to 1982 and considered by many to be its best in recent memory. Previously, he had been a perennial candidate in the Windsor area for the Co-operative Commonwealth Federation (CCF) and its successor, the New Democratic Party (NDP). He ran 22 times (at the municipal, provincial and federal levels) between the 1950s and 1980s, winning 12 times at the municipal level. It was during a 1974 November blizzard that stretched the voting into a second day and night that Weeks upset then mayor Frank Wansbrough to win his first term as mayor. He went on to serve two more terms (the last by acclamation). During Weeks's first term, he successfully advocated to change the term length from two to three years as he felt mayors would be more productive with three-year terms. When he retired from the mayor's office in 1982, he left the city of Windsor with a balanced budget.

While in office, he tirelessly advocated for public green space in the city of Windsor and spearheaded the formation of 9 parks including the Ganatchio Trail, Peche Island, Ojibway Prairie Grass Reserve, Malden Park, as well as the beautification of Windsor's waterfront along the Detroit River. He did not live to see the opening of the 5k Windsor Riverfront Trail in 1999.

Weeks was born in Montreal and moved to Windsor in 1946 with his wife Sheila and two-year-old twin daughters. Four other children were born in Windsor. An apprenticed watch repairman, he initially set up a watch repair shop, which later grew to become a jewellery and watch repair business (Bert Weeks Jewellers) which stood on Ouellette Avenue for many years.

Frustrated with blatant illegal activities in Windsor, Weeks organized the Citizens Action Committee shortly after moving to Windsor to look into police inaction "after hearing that people were being beaten up and disappearing" [Windsor Star, Dec. 11/90]. He later collected information on corruption in the Windsor police force and provided it to the Ontario Provincial Police, but had to do so in Detroit in order to ensure his safety. At his wife's insistence, he armed himself with a large screwdriver figuring if he were questioned at the Windsor/Detroit border, "I could always say I was going to fix a clock" [Windsor Star, Dec. 11/90]. This led to a report from the provincial Attorney General Dana Porter in 1950 which was critical of the Windsor police force. Two members of the police commission resigned and later the police chief and deputy chief also resigned. Although mayor Reaume denied any knowledge of the situation, as the third member of the police commission, his reputation was tarnished as well. Weeks was elected to Windsor city council in 1954 and 1965.

When Weeks ran against incumbent mayor Frank Wansbrough in 1974, the initial vote count had him 300 votes behind Wansbrough. However, as there had been a vote counting error, the final tally had Weeks the winner by 749 votes. In February 1982, near the end of his third term, Weeks announced that he would not run for reelection later that year.

As a long-time humanitarian, Weeks was involved in various local efforts to provide safe haven for refugees including those from the Hungarian Revolution of 1956 and most notably, he opened Windsor's doors to the Vietnamese boat people following the end of the Vietnamese War and the Communist takeover in 1975. Because of his efforts, Windsor became the first city in Canada to take in Vietnamese refugees, which encouraged other cities to follow suit. Weeks was also chair of the Windsor branch of UNICEF for many years.

The Bert Weeks Memorial Gardens and Fountain (at the foot of Parent Avenue on the Detroit Riverfront) was opened in September 2005 to honour his memory. This riverfront plaza, waterfall and reflecting pool was built with private donations by friends, colleagues, and local auto unions, as well as a donation from the City of Windsor.

In August 2014, Weeks's son, Howard William Weeks, announced that he would run for a seat on Windsor city council in the election held in October, but did not succeed. Howard subsequently joined in one of the failed lawsuits against the City alleging election impropriety following his failed bid for City Council.
