= Jackson Park (Windsor, Ontario) =

Park south of Downtown Windsor, Ontario, Canada

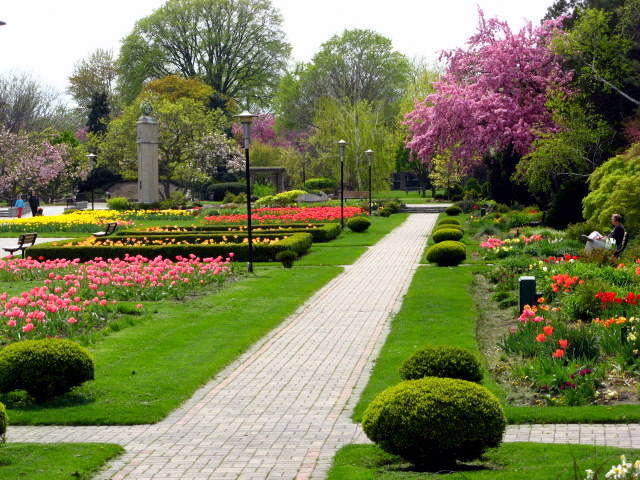
- A walking path in Jackson Park
- Interactive map of Jackson Park
- Type: Urban park
- Location: Windsor, Ontario
- Coordinates: 42°17′41.9″N 83°01′22″W
- Area: 59.07 acres (23.90 ha)
- Created: 1929
- Owner: City of Windsor

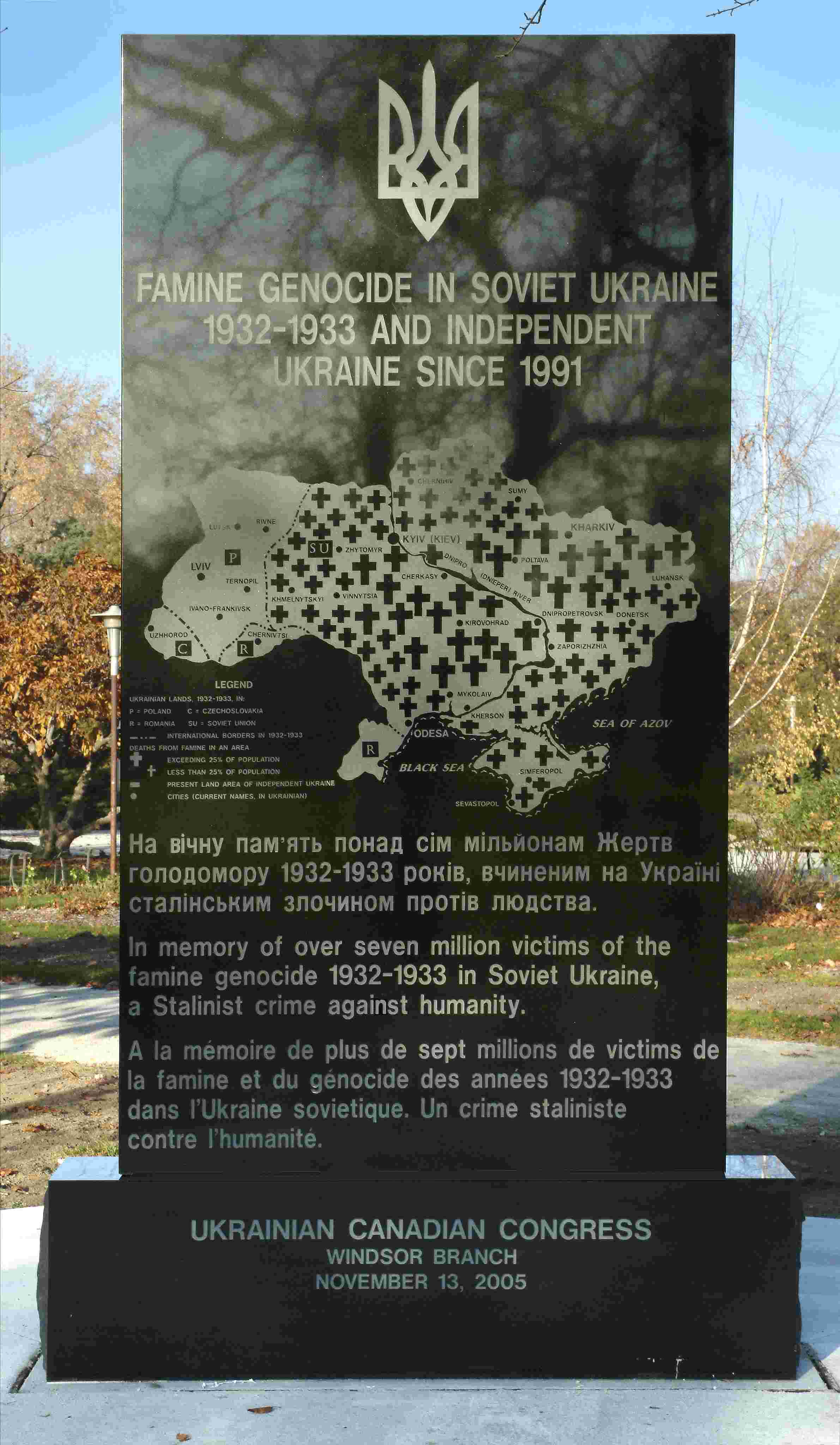
Holodomor Memorial in Queen Elizabeth II Gardens Jackson Park (Windsor) Windsor, Ontario, Canada dedicated "In memory of over seven million victims of the famine genocide 1932-1933 in Soviet Ukraine, a Stalinist crime against humanity."

Jackson Park is a park south of Downtown Windsor, Ontario, Canada. Acquired in 1929, with the persistence of then mayor Cecil E. Jackson, Windsor City Council voted in favour of purchasing the land from the Jockey Club. At the same meeting where the land was purchased, city council decided to name the new park after their mayor. Jackson Park has long been considered one of Windsor's most beautiful parks and attractions. It is most known for its yearly display annual garden beds and a large array of perennial plants. In the winter months, Jackson hosts Bright Lights Windsor, a Christmas light display put on by the City.

== Park ==
The park contains many war memorials including a World War II, a Korean War and a South African war memorial. Jackson Park contains more than 10,000 plants, many of which are located in its Sunken Gardens. The original World War II monument was an Avro Lancaster bomber aircraft FM212; it was removed in 2005 due to the effect that over four decades of exposure to the elements was having on it, and replaced by more weather-resistant fibreglass models of a Hawker Hurricane and a Supermarine Spitfire fighter. Beneath the two aircraft is a garden in the shape of the Lancaster bomber.

Jackson Park is also a well equipped, popular sports park. Besides being the permanent home of the Windsor Lawn Bowling Club and Windsor Tennis Club, the park also provides a wide assortment of creative play units, ball diamonds and a cricket field. In 1991, both the lighted tennis courts and the lawn bowling greens were upgraded and repairs made to the cedar pergola structure. In the early 2010s, a new pergola was constructed to replace the weathered original.

Jackson Park is one of the most intricate parks in Windsor. The park features formal gardens, fountains, monuments, and a network of walking areas. There are monuments in memory of the Boer War, Korean War and World War II, as well as those commemorating important people, such as the sundial which bears the name of Polish astronomer Nicolas Copernicus.

Many of the walkways are in well-lit and open areas, but there are a few that lead to shade, or to quiet spots tucked away between bushes and tall plants. Online reviews describe it as "well maintained" and "worth an afternoon of exploration".

Amenities include: cricket pitch, baseball diamonds, picnic area, fountains, gardens, privately owned Parkside Tennis Club, Copernicus sundial, South African War Memorial, Land, Sea, Air Memorial, Robert Burns memorial, washrooms, concession.

=== Gates ===
The entrance gates, constructed in 1931, are located on the southeast corner of Ouellette Ave. and Tecumseh Rd. and were designed by Pennington and Boyde Architects.

=== Windsor Stadium ===
Maintenance of Windsor Stadium, built in 1929 as part of the Kennedy Collegiate property, was taken over by the City of Windsor in 1960. Improvements were completed on the turf along with several service buildings. Major upgrades to the facility were undertaken in 2006 to upgrade the seating and accessibility of the property. In 2015 the Greater Essex County District School Board had re-assumed the property and entered a land use contract with the AKO Fratmen. The fratmen had plans for restoration of the property that never came to fruition.

=== Bandshell ===
The original bandshell was built in 1950 however it burned down in a 1957 fire. In 1959 council approved the construction of the replacement bandshell for a sum of $42,200. The bandshell was designed by Johnson and McWhinnie and built by Loaring Construction Company. The new Bandshell was used for many events throughout the 60's and 70's including the Emancipation Day festival and Windsor's Battle of the Bands. Today, the Bandshell is used as storage for the City's parks department.

=== Field House ===
Built in 1961 and designed by then City Building Commissioner Patrick McGuire, the fieldhouse included a recreation office, dressing rooms for Windsor Stadium, a meeting room and a workshop for the City's Recreation Department.

=== Bright Lights ===
In 2017 the park was host to the first Bright Lights Windsor festival. In years since the scale of the festival has grown. Bright Lights Windsor is a holiday-themed winter light festival.

== Emancipation Day Celebrations ==
=== History ===
Emancipation Day celebrations in Jackson Park first began as smaller festivities hosted by Windsor citizens, some who are descendants of enslaved African-Americans who searched for freedom through the Underground Railroad. Soon enough, peaking in 1950s-1960s, the annual celebration prospered, extending over several days of gatherings, feasting, parades, among others. The celebration attracted hundreds of thousands across North America including renowned musicians like Diana Ross, Stevie Wonder and The Temptations; as well as notable civil rights activists such as Martin Luther King, Rosa Parks, Adam Clayton Powell and Eleanor Roosevelt.

== See also ==
- List of Robert Burns memorials
- Parks in Windsor, Ontario
