= Elizabeth Kishkon =

Canadian politician (1931–2018)

29th Mayor of Windsor
- In office 1983–1985
- Preceded by: Bert Weeks
- Succeeded by: David Burr

Personal details
- Born: Elizabeth Eva Kishkon; January 7, 1931 Oshawa, Ontario, Canada
- Died: August 29, 2018 (aged 87) Windsor, Ontario, Canada

Elizabeth Eva Kishkon (January 7, 1931 – August 29, 2018) was a Canadian politician, who served as the 29th mayor of the city of Windsor, Ontario, from 1983 to 1985. She was the first woman ever elected to the mayoralty of Windsor, and as of 2024, is currently the only woman ever elected mayor.

Born in Oshawa, Ontario, Kishkon grew up in London, England. As mayor, she hosted a royal visit to Windsor by Queen Elizabeth and Prince Philip in 1984.

She was awarded an honorary LL.D. by the University of Windsor in 1986.

Federal New Democratic Party leader Ed Broadbent asked Kishkon to run as the NDP's candidate in Windsor West in the 1988 federal election. Kishkon refused, however, citing the fact that she did not want to run against Herb Gray.

She died in Windsor at the age of 87 in 2018.
