= James Clark (Ontario politician) =

Canadian politician

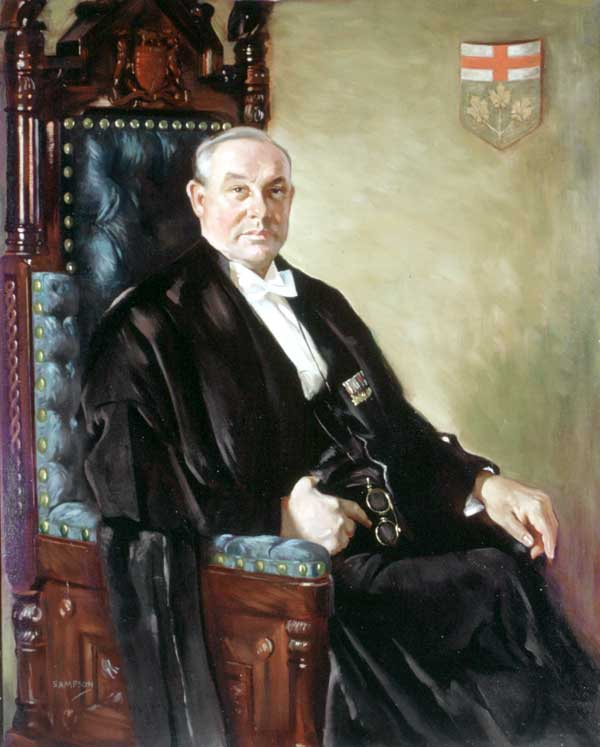

Ontario MPP
- In office 1934–1943
- Preceded by: New riding
- Succeeded by: George Bennett
- Constituency: Windsor—Sandwich

Personal details
- Born: May 11, 1888 Ingersoll, Ontario
- Died: August 25, 1952 (aged 64) Windsor, Ontario
- Party: Liberal

James Howard Clark (May 11, 1888 – August 25, 1952) was a politician in Ontario, Canada. He was speaker of the Legislature of Ontario from 1939 to 1943 and served as Liberal MPP for Windsor—Sandwich from 1934 to 1943.

He was born in Ingersoll, Ontario. Despite his father's death while he was still young, Clark was able to complete his education at the local high school and went on to attend Victoria College. In 1914, he began the study of law at Osgoode Hall. During World War I, he served with the 96th Lake Superior Battalion and saw action at the Somme, Vimy, Passchendaele, Canal du Nord and Valenciennes. He resumed his legal studies in 1919, articled in Port Arthur, was called to the Ontario bar in 1920 and entered practice in Windsor. In 1930, Clark travelled to England to successfully argue a case before the British Privy Council.

Clark was elected in 1934 for Windsor—Sandwich. After Norman Hipel resigned as speaker to join the provincial cabinet, he was named speaker.

In June 1943, Clark gave a speech in Detroit in which he stated that 40 to 45 per cent of the Canadian population would "vote for annexation to the United States because there are better living conditions there". This enraged the Canadian public, the Canadian press and Canadian politicians. He was defeated in the general election which followed later that year. He subsequently returned to the practice of law.

Clark died in Windsor at the age of 64.
