= M. C. Davies (politician) =

Canadian politician

M.C. Davies

Ontario MPP
- In office 1945–1959
- Preceded by: William Riggs
- Succeeded by: Bernard Newman
- Constituency: Windsor—Walkerville

Personal details
- Born: May 26, 1897; Aberaeron, Wales
- Died: December 29, 1970 (aged 73); Walkerville, Ontario, Canada
- Political party: Progressive Conservative
- Spouse: Inez Carter
- Children: 3
- Occupation: Anglican archdeacon

Myrddyn Cooke Davies (May 26, 1897 – December 29, 1970) was a politician in Ontario, Canada. He was a Progressive Conservative member of the Legislative Assembly of Ontario from 1945 to 1959 who represented the riding of Windsor—Walkerville. From 1949 to 1955 he served as Speaker of the House.

== Background ==
He was born in Aberaeron, Wales, the son of William Davies, and came to Canada in 1919. He was educated in Wales, in Michigan and in London, Ontario. in 1918, he joined the United States Army and served for ten months during World War I. In 1921, he married Inez Carter. Davies served in the chaplain corps of the RCAF during World War II rising to the rank of Wing Commander and deputy of chaplain services for the RCAF.

== Politics ==
Davies was elected to the Legislative Assembly of Ontario in the 1945 Ontario election. He defeated UAW-Labour candidate George Burt by 1,827 votes. On February 10, 1949, Davies was named as Speaker of the House. He held the post until August 1955 when a new speaker was chosen.

== Later life ==
After leaving the legislature, Davies returned to his role as rector of St. George's Anglican Church in Walkerville. He retired in 1964 and was named pastor emeritus. He died in Walkerville at the age of 73.
