= Andrew Dowie =

Canadian politician (born 1981)

Andrew Dowie MPP
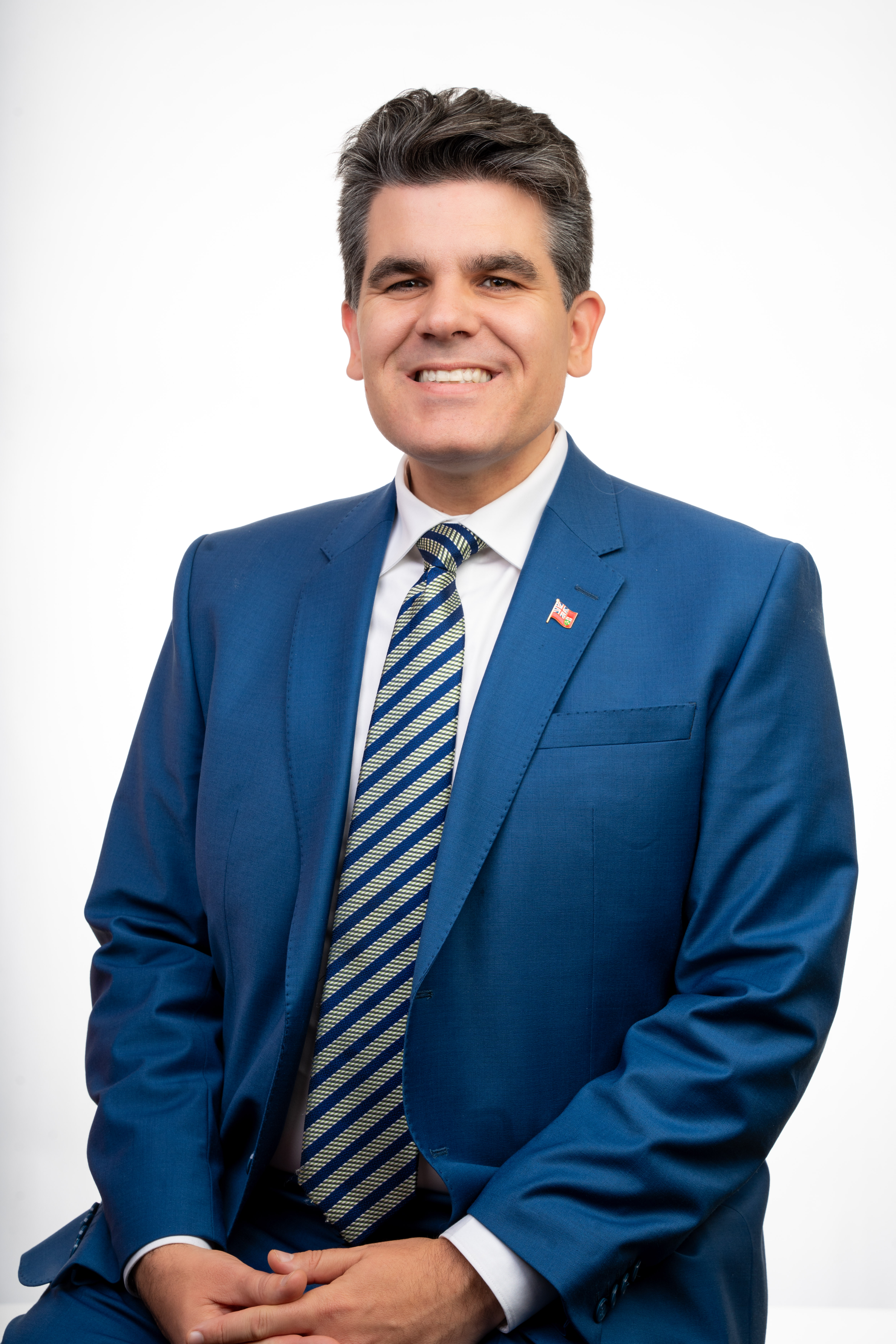
- Andrew Dowie in 2024

Member of the Ontario Provincial Parliament for Windsor—Tecumseh
- Incumbent
- Assumed office June 2, 2022
- Preceded by: Percy Hatfield

Personal details
- Born: April 23, 1981 (age 45) Windsor, Ontario
- Party: Progressive Conservative
- Spouse: Mary Dowie
- Profession: Civil Engineer

Andrew Dowie MPP is a Canadian politician, who was elected to the Legislative Assembly of Ontario in the 2022 provincial election. He represents the riding of Windsor—Tecumseh as a member of the Progressive Conservative Party of Ontario.

== Early life and education ==
Andrew Dowie was born in Windsor, Ontario. He attended the University of Ottawa, where he earned degrees in civil engineering and computing technology in 2006. He later completed a Master's Certificate in Community Leadership at the University of Windsor and became licensed as a Professional Engineer (P.Eng.) in Ontario in 2009.

== Engineering career ==
Dowie held a variety of engineering, policy, project management, and leadership positions at the City of Windsor between 2002 and 2022.

Early in his engineering career, Dowie was selected to participate in Rotary International's Group Study Exchange (GSE) program. Sponsored by the Windsor-St. Clair Rotary Club, he travelled to Ghana and Burkina Faso in 2010 as part of a delegation focused on water infrastructure, sanitation, public health, and professional development.

Dowie became active in Professional Engineers Ontario (PEO) shortly after joining the profession. He joined the Windsor-Essex Chapter in 2006, served on its executive, and chaired the chapter in 2013 and 2014. He also participated in the Government Liaison Program and Education Scholarship committees.

Working with PEO, he helped establish the organization's first Candidate College initiative, which encouraged engineers to seek elected office and become involved in public policy.

== Community involvement ==
In addition to his professional activities, Dowie has been involved in a number of volunteer and community organizations. He has served on citizen committees and boards, acted as a leader with Scouts Canada, and participated as a judge at the Windsor Regional Science, Technology and Engineering Fair and the Canada-Wide Science Fair.

== Municipal politics ==
Dowie was elected to Tecumseh Town Council in 2014, representing Ward 1. He was re-elected by acclamation in 2018 following ward redistribution. During his time on council, he focused on infrastructure development, economic growth, municipal planning, and community development.

== Provincial politics ==
Dowie was elected to the Legislative Assembly of Ontario in the 2022 provincial election as the Progressive Conservative candidate for Windsor—Tecumseh.

His election marked the first Progressive Conservative victory in the modern Windsor—Tecumseh riding. The Tecumseh portion of the riding was last represented by Conservative MPP Paul Poisson, who served Essex North from 1926 to 1934, while portions of Windsor within the present-day riding boundaries were represented by Progressive Conservative MPP Myrddyn Cooke Davies, who served Windsor—Walkerville from 1945 to 1959 and was Speaker of the Legislative Assembly from 1949 to 1955.

His election was also notable for having secured the endorsement of Mayor Gary McNamara of Tecumseh. McNamara was previously the Liberal candidate for Windsor-Riverside in 1995 and 1997.

Following his election, Dowie was appointed Parliamentary Assistant to the Minister of Economic Development, Job Creation and Trade, serving from June 30, 2022 to March 28, 2024. He was subsequently appointed Parliamentary Assistant to the Minister of the Environment, Conservation and Parks.

== Awards and recognition ==
Dowie has received several honours recognizing his contributions to engineering, leadership, and community service.

- G. Gordon M. Sterling Engineering Intern Award (2010), becoming the inaugural recipient of the Professional Engineers Ontario award recognizing leadership, volunteerism, and service by an engineering intern.
- Fellow of Engineers Canada (FEC) (2017).
- Professional Engineers Ontario Order of Honour (2018), awarded for leadership and service to the engineering profession and community.
- 40 Leaders Under 40 (2018), awarded by Leadership Windsor-Essex in recognition of professional achievement and community leadership.

== Election results ==
2025 Ontario general election
Party	Candidate	Votes	%	±%	Expenditures
Progressive Conservative	Andrew Dowie	21,285	48.23	+2.34	$61,570
New Democratic	Gemma Grey-Hall	13,721	31.09	+1.12	$53,377
Liberal	Connor Logan	6,337	14.36	–0.16	$17,199
Green	Roxanne Tellier	830	1.88	–0.72	$0
Ontario Party	Steven Gifford	719	1.63	–1.53	$320
New Blue	Sophia Sevo	707	1.60	–0.44	$390
Communist	Kyle Ford	606	1.37	N/A	$0
Total valid votes/expense limit		44,135	99.17	-0.24	$ 158,598
Total rejected, unmarked, and declined ballots		303	0.83	+0.24	
Turnout		44,506	45.09	+4.48	
Eligible voters		97,698			
Progressive Conservative hold		Swing		+0.7	
Source: Elections Ontario

2022 Ontario general election: Windsor—Tecumseh
Party	Candidate	Votes	%	±%	Expenditures
Progressive Conservative	Andrew Dowie	17,692	45.89	+18.85	$89,233
New Democratic	Gemma Grey-Hall	11,551	29.96	−28.44	$110,170
Liberal	Gary Kaschak	5,598	14.52	+6.39	$40,326
Ontario Party	Steven Gifford	1,219	3.16		$0
Green	Melissa Coulbeck	1,002	2.60	−1.82	$0
New Blue	Sophia Sevo	786	2.04		$3,195
Independent	Laura Chesnik	204	0.53	−1.47	$6,362
None of the Above	David Sylvestre	179	0.46		$0
Independent	Nick Babic	173	0.45		$0
Independent	Giovanni Abati	147	0.38		$3,734
Total valid votes/expense limit		38,551	99.41	+0.48	$133,683
Total rejected, unmarked, and declined ballots		228	0.59	-0.48	
Turnout		38,779	40.61	-7.22	
Eligible voters		94,976			
Progressive Conservative gain from New Democratic		Swing		+23.65	
Source(s): "Summary of Valid Votes Cast for Each Candidate" (PDF). Elections Ontario. 2022. Archived from the original on 2023-05-18.; "Statistical Summary by Electoral District" (PDF). Elections Ontario. 2022. Archived from the original on 2023-05-21.
