= Bernard Newman (politician) =

Canadian politician (1914–1995)

Bernie Newman

Ontario MPP
- In office 1959–1987
- Preceded by: M.C. Davies
- Succeeded by: Mike Ray
- Constituency: Windsor—Walkerville

Personal details
- Born: August 4, 1914 Windsor, Ontario, Canada
- Died: November 6, 1995 (aged 81) Windsor, Ontario, Canada
- Party: Liberal
- Spouse: Lee Newman
- Children: 5
- Occupation: Teacher, athletics coach

Bernard Newman (August 4, 1914 – November 6, 1995) was a Canadian politician in Ontario. He was a Liberal member of the Legislative Assembly of Ontario from 1959 to 1987 who represented the riding of Windsor—Walkerville.

== Background ==
Newman was born in Windsor, Ontario. He received a Bachelor of Arts degree from Assumption College at the University of Windsor, and began working as a secondary school teacher in 1934. He also reached the rank of Lieutenant in the Canadian Armed Forces. A star athlete in high school, Newman served as national chairman of gymnastics for the Amateur Athletic Union of Canada in 1955-56, and coached the Canadian gymnastic team at the 1956 Olympic Games, the 1958 World Games and the 1959 Pan-American Games. Newman died on November 6, 1995, at the age of 81, after being diagnosed with Alzheimer's disease.

== Politics ==
Newman was elected as a Windsor alderman in 1954, and served three terms on the city council from 1955 to 1960.

In the 1959 provincial election he ran as the Liberal candidate in the riding of Windsor—Walkerville. He defeated Progressive Conservative Roy Hicks by 1,024 votes. He was re-elected seven more times before retiring from the legislature in 1987 after 28 years of service.

From 1959 to 1985, he sat in opposition. Following the 1985 election, the Liberal Party ended forty-two years of Progressive Conservative government in Ontario by forming a minority administration with outside support from the NDP. He served as a backbench supporter of the David Peterson government. He did not seek re-election in 1987.
