= Emilia Cundari =

Soprano opera singer

- Portrait of Cundari in 1958 as Annina in La Traviata taken by Louis Melancon

Background information
- Born: September 7, 1930; Detroit, Michigan
- Died: January 6, 2005 (aged 74) Southfield, Michigan
- Genres: Opera
- Instrument: Soprano

Emilia Cundari (September 7, 1930 – January 6, 2005) was a soprano opera singer who was born in Detroit, Michigan, and raised in Windsor, Ontario. She performed with the Metropolitan Opera in New York City and La Scala in Milan, Italy, prior to retiring from performing to raise a family.

== Early life and education ==
Cundari was born in 1930 in Detroit, Michigan, to Frank and Ambrosina Cundari. Her father co-owned and operated Mario's Restaurant in Windsor, Ontario, where she attended Dougall Avenue School in addition to taking classes at the Ursuline School of Music. She later attended St. Mary's Academy where here vocal talent was apparent to teachers early on. The school, operated by the Sisters of the Holy Names of Jesus and Mary, began offering music training in 1864. Cundari went on to continue her studies at Marygrove College in Detroit, graduating with a bachelor of music. In her early 20s, she was awarded a $2,000 Grinnell music scholarship, which allowed to travel to New York City, where she continued her studies with conductor Max Rudolf and the New York City Opera. She later studied with soprano Magda Piccarolo in Milan in the 1960s.

== Career ==
Cundari made her debut with the New York City Opera in 1953, performing as the Dew Fairy in Hansel and Gretel. Two years later she was signed as a soprano with the Metropolitan Opera, along with Madelaine Chambers. Her first performance as Barbarina in The Marriage of Figaro on March 1, 1956. Cundari debuted in a lead role with the company on March 19, 1957, as Micaela in a production of Carmen. A reviewer for The New York Times said the role was well suited to her soprano voice, calling her performance "highly promising." She continued on in the role during a company tour that included a run at Maple Leaf Gardens in Toronto, Ontario. In 1958 her performance as Lauretta in Giacomo Puccini's Gianni Schicchi with the Met was reviewed by the paper as delivering a "graceful and pretty" performance that was in need of "a little more assurance" despite garnering applause for the aria "O mio babbino caro".

Following her work with the Met, Cundari moved to Italy, where she performed with La Scala in Milan and toured throughout Europe. In addition to live performances, Cundari appeared on several recordings including Beethoven's Symphony No. 9 and Mahler's Symphony No. 2 under the direction of conductor and composer Bruno Walter.

While in Italy Cundari met opera singer Sergio Pezzetti, whom she married in 1965. Following the birth of their son, Cundari returned to Windsor, where she occasionally performed and taught music. Despite multiple requests to perform abroad, Cundari spent the remainder of her life outside of the spotlight.

== Death and legacy ==
Cundari died January 6, 2005, at the age of 74, in Southfield, Michigan. Although she achieved international recognition in the 1950s and 1960s, her musical career remained largely unrecognized until after her death. Since that time, an opera about the lives of Cundari and photographer Pat Sturn was produced by cellist Nadine Deleury in 2014. Four years later, a crowd-funding campaign to add a memorial plaque to the Windsor mausoleum, where Cundari was laid to rest, was launched by soprano Tara Sievers-Hunt. It resulted in the installation of a bronze plaque featuring roses and crosses at the site of her previously unmarked crypt at Heavenly Rest Cemetery.

== Recordings ==
- Beethoven's Symphony No. 9 (1958) OCLC 3364797
- Mahler's Symphony No. 2 : in C minor (Resurrection) OCLC 224088634
- Antonio Vivaldi, Nisi Dominus, Magnificat (1961) OCLC 878391447
