= Windsor—Tecumseh (provincial electoral district) =

Provincial electoral district in Ontario, Canada

Coordinates: 42.293°N 82.900°W

Ontario electoral district
- Location in Windsor

Provincial electoral district
- Legislature: Legislative Assembly of Ontario
MPP
Andrew Dowie
Progressive Conservative
- District created: 1996
- First contested: 1999
- Last contested: 2025

Demographics
- Population (2016): 117,430
- Electors (2018): 91,269
- Area (km²): 189
- Pop. density (per km²): 621.3
- Census division: Essex
- Census subdivision(s): Windsor, Tecumseh

Windsor—Tecumseh is a provincial electoral district in Ontario, Canada, that has been represented in the Legislative Assembly of Ontario since the 2007 provincial election and as Windsor—St. Clair for the 1999 provincial election and 2003 provincial elections.

It was created in 1996 from parts of Windsor—Riverside and Windsor—Walkerville.

It consists of the town of Tecumseh, and the part of the city of Windsor lying east and north of a line drawn from the U.S. border southeast along Langlois Avenue, east along Tecumseh Road East, and southeast along Pillette Road to the southern city limit.

== Members of Provincial Parliament ==
Windsor—St. Clair
Assembly	Years	Member	Party
Riding created from Windsor—Riverside and Windsor—Walkerville
37th	1999–2003	Dwight Duncan	Liberal
38th	2003–2007	Dwight Duncan	Liberal
Windsor—Tecumseh
39th	2007–2011	Dwight Duncan	Liberal
40th	2011–2013	Dwight Duncan	Liberal
40th	2013–2014	Percy Hatfield	New Democratic
41st	2014–2018	Percy Hatfield	New Democratic
42nd	2018–2022	Percy Hatfield	New Democratic
43rd	2022–present	Andrew Dowie	Progressive Conservative

== Election results ==
=== Windsor—Tecumseh ===
Winning party in each polling division of Windsor—Tecumseh at the 2025 Ontario general election

2025 Ontario general election
Party	Candidate	Votes	%	±%	Expenditures
Progressive Conservative	Andrew Dowie	21,285	48.23	+2.34	$61,570
New Democratic	Gemma Grey-Hall	13,721	31.09	+1.12	$53,377
Liberal	Connor Logan	6,337	14.36	–0.16	$17,199
Green	Roxanne Tellier	830	1.88	–0.72	$0
Ontario Party	Steven Gifford	719	1.63	–1.53	$320
New Blue	Sophia Sevo	707	1.60	–0.44	$390
Communist	Kyle Ford	606	1.37	N/A	$0
Total valid votes/expense limit		44,135	99.17	-0.24	$ 158,598
Total rejected, unmarked, and declined ballots		303	0.83	+0.24	
Turnout		44,506	45.09	+4.48	
Eligible voters		97,698			
Progressive Conservative hold		Swing		+0.7	
Source: Elections Ontario

Winning party in each polling division of Windsor—Tecumseh at the 2022 Ontario general election

2022 Ontario general election
Party	Candidate	Votes	%	±%	Expenditures
Progressive Conservative	Andrew Dowie	17,692	45.89	+18.85	$89,233
New Democratic	Gemma Grey-Hall	11,551	29.96	−28.44	$110,170
Liberal	Gary Kaschak	5,598	14.52	+6.39	$40,326
Ontario Party	Steven Gifford	1,219	3.16		$0
Green	Melissa Coulbeck	1,002	2.60	−1.82	$0
New Blue	Sophia Sevo	786	2.04		$3,195
Independent	Laura Chesnik	204	0.53	−1.47	$6,362
None of the Above	David Sylvestre	179	0.46		$0
Independent	Nick Babic	173	0.45		$0
Independent	Giovanni Abati	147	0.38		$3,734
Total valid votes/expense limit		38,551	99.41	+0.48	$133,683
Total rejected, unmarked, and declined ballots		228	0.59	-0.48	
Turnout		38,779	40.61	-7.22	
Eligible voters		94,976			
Progressive Conservative gain from New Democratic		Swing		+23.65	
Source(s): "Summary of Valid Votes Cast for Each Candidate" (PDF). Elections Ontario. 2022. Archived from the original on May 18, 2023.; "Statistical Summary by Electoral District" (PDF). Elections Ontario. 2022. Archived from the original on May 21, 2023.

2018 Ontario general election
Party	Candidate	Votes	%	±%
New Democratic	Percy Hatfield	25,221	58.40	-3.75
Progressive Conservative	Mohammad Latif	11,677	27.04	+12.08
Liberal	Remy Boulbol	3,513	8.14	-7.12
Green	Henry Oulevey	1,909	4.42	-1.35
Independent	Laura Chesnik	863	2.00	
Total valid votes		43,183	98.93	
Total rejected, unmarked and declined ballots		468	1.07	-0.39
Turnout		43,651	47.83	+5.06
Eligible voters		91,269		
New Democratic hold		Swing		-7.92
Source: Elections Ontario

2014 Ontario general election
Party	Candidate	Votes	%	±%
New Democratic	Percy Hatfield	22,818	62.16	+0.84
Liberal	Jason Dupuis	5,599	15.25	+3.31
Progressive Conservative	Brandon Wright	5,493	14.96	-5.18
Green	Adam Wright	2,118	5.77	+4.38
Libertarian	Timothy Joel Marshall	682	1.86	+0.31
Total valid votes		36,710	98.53	
Total rejected, unmarked and declined ballots		546	1.47	
Turnout		37,256	42.77	
Eligible voters		87,108		
New Democratic hold		Swing		-1.24
Source: Elections Ontario

Ontario provincial by-election, August 1, 2013 Resignation of Dwight Duncan
Party	Candidate	Votes	%	±%
New Democratic	Percy Hatfield	15,682	61.27	+28.43
Progressive Conservative	Robert de Verteuil	5,147	20.11	-0.71
Liberal	Jeewen Gill	3,057	11.94	-30.89
Green	Adam Wright	942	3.68	+1.45
Libertarian	Dan Dominato	400	1.56	+0.28
Family Coalition	Lee Watson	241	0.94	
Freedom	Andrew Brannan	124	0.48	
Total valid votes		25,593	100.00	
Total rejected, unmarked and declined ballots		225	0.87	
Turnout		25,818	30.35	
Eligible voters		85,075		
New Democratic gain from Liberal		Swing		+14.57
Source: Elections Ontario

2011 Ontario general election
Party	Candidate	Votes	%	±%
Liberal	Dwight Duncan	15,946	42.83	-6.51
New Democratic	Andrew McAvoy	12,228	32.84	+8.48
Progressive Conservative	Robert de Verteuil	7,751	20.82	+3.98
Green	Justin Levesque	830	2.23	-5.20
Libertarian	Dan Dominato	476	1.28	
Total valid votes		37,231	100.00	
Total rejected, unmarked and declined ballots		222	0.59	
Turnout		37,453	44.69	
Eligible voters		83,807		
Liberal hold		Swing		-7.50
Source:Elections Ontario

2007 Ontario general election
Party	Candidate	Votes	%	±%
Liberal	Dwight Duncan	17,894	49.34	-4.31
New Democratic	Helmi Charif	8,836	24.36	-4.78
Progressive Conservative	Kristine Robinson	6,106	16.84	+4.81
Green	Andrew McAvoy	2,696	7.43	
Family Coalition	John Curtin	735	2.03	
Total valid votes		36,267	100.0	
Difference		9,058	24.98	
Total rejected ballots		383	1.05	
Turnout		36,650	44.04	
Liberal hold		Swing	+0.23	

^ Change is based on redistributed results.

=== Windsor—St. Clair ===
2003 Ontario general election
Party	Candidate	Votes	%	±%
Liberal	Dwight Duncan	19,692	54.92	+9.83
New Democratic	Madeline Crnec	10,433	29.10	-5.06
Progressive Conservative	Matt Bufton	4,162	11.61	-7.17
Green	Chris Holt	1,315	3.67	+2.79

1999 Ontario general election
Party	Candidate	Votes	%
Liberal	Dwight Duncan	17,383	45.09
New Democratic	Wayne Lessard	13,171	34.16
Progressive Conservative	Mike Rohrer	7,241	18.78
Green	Darren Brown	339	0.88
Total valid votes		38,134	100.0

== 2007 electoral reform referendum ==
2007 Ontario electoral reform referendum
Side	Votes	%
First Past the Post	22,717	64.5
Mixed member proportional	12,482	35.5
Total valid votes	35,199	100.0

== See also ==
- List of Ontario provincial electoral districts
- Canadian provincial electoral districts
