= Windsor—Walkerville (provincial electoral district) =

Former provincial electoral district in Ontario, Canada

Ontario electoral district

Defunct provincial electoral district
- Legislature: Legislative Assembly of Ontario
- District created: 1934
- District abolished: 1996
- First contested: 1934
- Last contested: 1995

Windsor—Walkerville was a provincial electoral district in Ontario, Canada. It was created in 1934 from Windsor East, in which it had the same borders. In 1996 it was merged into Windsor—St. Clair before the 1999 election.

== Members of Provincial Parliament ==
Windsor East
Assembly	Years	Member	Party
Riding created from Windsor
17th	1926–1929	Frank Worthington Wilson	Conservative
18th	1929–1934	Frank Worthington Wilson	Conservative
Riding renamed Windsor—Walkerville

Windsor—Walkerville
Assembly	Years	Member	Party
19th	1934–1937	David Croll	Liberal
20th	1937–1943	David Croll	Liberal
21st	1943–1945	William Riggs	Co-operative Commonwealth
22nd	1945–1948	M. C. Davies	Progressive Conservative
23rd	1948–1951	M. C. Davies	Progressive Conservative
24th	1951–1955	M. C. Davies	Progressive Conservative
25th	1955–1959	M. C. Davies	Progressive Conservative
26th	1959–1963	Bernard Newman	Liberal
27th	1963–1967	Bernard Newman	Liberal
28th	1967–1971	Bernard Newman	Liberal
29th	1971–1975	Bernard Newman	Liberal
30th	1975–1977	Bernard Newman	Liberal
31st	1977–1981	Bernard Newman	Liberal
32nd	1981–1985	Bernard Newman	Liberal
33rd	1985–1987	Bernard Newman	Liberal
34th	1987–1990	Mike Ray	Liberal
35th	1990–1995	Wayne Lessard	New Democratic
36th	1995–1999	Dwight Duncan	Liberal
Sourced from the Ontario Legislative Assembly
Merged into Windsor—St. Clair before the 1999 election

== See also ==
- List of Ontario provincial electoral districts
- Canadian provincial electoral districts
