= Mike Ray =

Canadian politician (1936–2021)

Michael (Mike) Charles Ray

Ontario MPP
- In office 1987–1990
- Preceded by: Bernard Newman
- Succeeded by: Wayne Lessard
- Constituency: Windsor—Walkerville

Personal details
- Born: August 27, 1936 Hamilton, Ontario, Canada
- Died: October 7, 2021 (aged 85) Windsor, Ontario
- Party: Liberal
- Spouse: Joyce Ray (Bowes)
- Children: Lea Ray and Stacey Ray
- Occupation: Lawyer

Michael Charles Ray (August 27, 1936 – October 7, 2021) was a politician in Ontario, Canada. He served in the Legislative Assembly of Ontario as a Liberal from 1987 to 1990.

== Background ==
Ray graduated from the University of Western Ontario, with a B.A. (Hons) in Economics and Political Science. He received a teaching degree from the Ontario College of Education, a law degree from the University of Windsor Law School and was called to the Ontario Bar in 1973.

Ray worked as a lawyer and was director of clinical law at the Faculty of Law, Legal Assistance Program of the University of Windsor. He was instrumental in developing the curriculum for clinical law students. His influence helped change the practice to allow legal students more access to clinical experience in all court rooms.

== Politics ==
In 1980, Ray was elected to the Windsor City Council where he served as an alderman in Windsor from 1980 to 1987.

Ray was elected to the Ontario legislature as a Member of the 34th Provincial Parliament in the 1987 provincial election, defeating NDP candidate Donna Champagne by 946 votes in the constituency of Windsor—Walkerville. He served in David Peterson's government for the next three years.

The Liberals were defeated by the NDP in the 1990 provincial election, and Ray lost his seat to Wayne Lessard of the NDP by 4,318 votes.

https://windsorstar.com/news/local-news/mike-ray-former-city-councillor-and-windsor-mpp-dies#:~:text=Ray%2C%20first%20elected%20to%20Windsor%20council%20in%201980,Windsor-Walkerville%20and%20served%20at%20Queen%E2%80%99s%20Park%20until%201990.

== Later life ==
After his career in politics, Ray returned to practicing law and acted as the lead regional counsel for the Support and Custody Legal Services Branch of the Ministry of the attorney general. Ray was appointed to the board of the Windsor Regional Hospital in 2004, served until 2013 and was a chairman of the board. Ray also served as a director of the Windsor Port Authority from 2006 to 2015, and as a member of the Windsor Police Services Board. He died on October 7, 2021.
