= Percy Hatfield =

Canadian politician

Percy Hatfield MPP
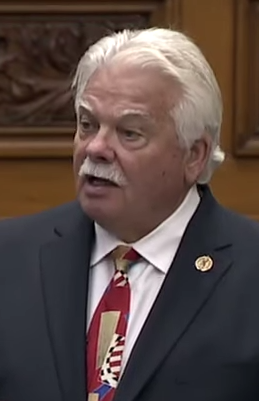

Member of the Ontario Provincial Parliament for Windsor—Tecumseh
- In office September 9, 2013 – May 3, 2022
- Preceded by: Dwight Duncan
- Succeeded by: Andrew Dowie

Windsor City Councillor
- In office 2006–2013
- Leader: Andrea Horwath
- Preceded by: Tom Wilson
- Succeeded by: Irek Kusmierczyk
- Constituency: Ward 5 (2006-2010); Ward 7 (2010-2013)

Critic, OLG and Horse Racing
- Incumbent
- Assumed office August 23, 2018

Personal details
- Born: 1948 (age 77–78) St. Martins, New Brunswick
- Party: New Democratic
- Spouse: Gale Simko
- Children: 2
- Occupation: Journalist

Percy Harper Hatfield (born c. 1948) is a politician in Ontario, Canada. He is a New Democratic member of the Legislative Assembly of Ontario who was elected in a 2013 by-election. He represented the riding of Windsor—Tecumseh.

== Early life and education ==
Hatfield was born in St. Martins, New Brunswick. As an army brat he frequently moved, living in Fort Churchill, Manitoba, Halifax, Nova Scotia, Oromocto, New Brunswick, St. John's, Newfoundland, Port Alberni, British Columbia, and Pembroke, Ontario. He holds a bachelor's degree in political science from the University of Windsor.

== Career ==
In Pembroke Hatfield started a broadcast career at CHOV radio and television in 1970. He then worked in radio and television in St. John's, Newfoundland and Leamington, Ontario.

He worked as a weekend reporter with the Windsor Star before joining CBC radio in Windsor as a local reporter. In 1978, he transferred to CBC television in Windsor. For the most part of his career he has been a reporter, although he also spent time as an announcer, writer, and producer. Hatfield was part of the Windsor Experiment which introduced multi-skilling and cross-skilling to CBC operations. Reporters started shooting their own television stories, and camera operators were trained as reporters - becoming video journalists.

Although he covered the education and automotive beats, most of his time with CBC Television was spent as Windsor's Municipal Affairs Reporter. For many years he hosted a popular segment called “Percy’s Political Panel” where many up and coming would-be politicians got their first notice in the public eye. Some went on to get elected at the municipal, provincial and federal levels.

°Hatfield was heavily involved with his union while working at the CBC. Initially, it was the old Canadian Wire Service Guild, the CWSG, where besides serving as a local shop steward he served ten years on his National Executive. The CWSG was a Local of The Newspaper Guild (TNG), based in Washington, D.C. Hatfield was elected as the national secretary of the CWSG and the chair of the Canadian District Council of the Newspaper Guild. The CWSG evolved into the Canadian Media Guild and he was elected Vice-President for Central Canada then elected At-Large as a member of the International Executive Board (the I.E.B.) of the Newspaper Guild, the first Canadian ever elected to an “at large” position with the Guild.

Soon after, TNG merged with and became a Sector within the Communications Workers of America (CWA) based in Washington, D.C.. After three terms as an “At Large” member, the I.E.B. was downsized, dropping the “At Large” positions and Hatfield went on to serve two terms as the Easter Canadian Vice-President of the TNG/CWA. In 2000, he was recognized by his Union with the CMG's Meritorious Service Award.

== Politics ==
When he retired from the CBC in August 2006 he began getting involved in municipal politics. That fall he was elected to the first of two terms as a city councillor in Windsor.

As a Councillor Hatfield served two terms on the National Board of the Federation of Canadian Municipalities (FCM) and was elected three times to the board of the Association of Municipalities of Ontario (AMO). In 2011, Hatfield served as an AMO chair of the Large Urban Caucus. He has served on numerous City of Windsor and Agency committees including the AMO Host Committee, Arena Board, Armouries Reuse Committee, CAO Performance Review Committee, Clean City Committee, Council Support Services Review Committee, Development Charges Task Force, Environmental Master Plan Implementation Committee, Essex Region Conservation Authority, Heritage Committee, International Relations Committee, Museum Facility Steering Committee, Olde Riverside BIA, Planning & Economic Development Standing Committee, Planning Advisory Committee, Public Health Unit, Roseland Golf Club Board of Directors, Social Development Standing Committee, Solid Waste Authority, Tourism Windsor - Transitional Board, Transit Windsor board of directors, War Memorial Committee, WFCU steering committee, Windsor BIA advisory committee, Windsor Essex Community Housing Corporation Board, Windsor Essex County Health Unit, Windsor Essex Environment Committee, Windsor Licensing Commission, and the Windsor Public Library Board.

Hatfield was elected to the Legislative Assembly of Ontario in a by-election on August 1, 2013, as the New Democratic candidate in the riding of Windsor—Tecumseh. He defeated Progressive Conservative candidate Robert De Verteuil by 10,544 votes. He was re-elected in the 2014 provincial election defeating Liberal Jason Dupuis by 17,221 votes. Hatfield was re-elected in the 2018 provincial election, defeating Progressive Conservative candidate Mohammad Latif by 13,546 votes.

His previous critic roles include Infrastructure, Environment and Climate Change, and Municipal Affairs and Housing. Currently, Hatfield holds the critic role of OLG and Horse Racing, as well as the position of Second Deputy Speaker of the Committee of the Whole House. In this position, Hatfield was asked by Speaker Ted Arnott to be Ontario's representative on the executive committee of the Council of State Governments (CSG). The CSG is a region-based forum that fosters the exchange of insights and ideas to help state and provincial officials shape public policy. Hatfield's appointment was the first time that the Legislative Assembly of Ontario was offered a seat on the CSG executive committee.

He was also appointed by Speaker Arnott to serve as a member of the Midwest-Canada Relations Committee for the Midwestern Legislative Conference. This committee provides a forum for the exchange of ideas and consideration of mutual concerns, and has explored subjects ranging from border security, energy, and most recently trade-related issues and the future of Canada – US relations.

In December 2017, he introduced the bill Poet Laureate of Ontario Act In Memory of Gord Downie to the Legislative Assembly of Ontario; it passed in December 2019, establishing the Poet Laureate of Ontario.

In July 2021, Hatfield announced that he would be retiring from politics in 2022.

=== Electoral record ===
2018 Ontario general election: Windsor—Tecumseh
Party	Candidate	Votes	%	±%
New Democratic	Percy Hatfield	25,221	58.40	-3.71
Progressive Conservative	Mohammad Latif	11,677	27.04	+12.11
Liberal	Remy Boulbol	3,513	8.14	-7.11
Green	Henry Oulevey	1,909	4.42	-1.41
Independent	Laura Chesnik	863	2.00	
Total valid votes		43,183	100.0	
New Democratic hold		Swing		
Source: Elections Ontario

2014 Ontario general election: Windsor—Tecumseh
Party	Candidate	Votes	%	±%
New Democratic	Percy Hatfield	22,826	62.11	+0.84
Liberal	Jason Dupuis	5,605	15.25	+3.31
Progressive Conservative	Brandon Wright	5,485	14.93	-5.18
Green	Adam Wright	2,144	5.83	+4.38
Libertarian	Timothy Joel Marshall	688	1.87	+0.31
Total valid votes		36,748	100.0	
New Democratic hold		Swing		-1.24
Source: Elections Ontario

Ontario provincial by-election, August 1, 2013 Resignation of Dwight Duncan
Party	Candidate	Votes	%	±%
New Democratic	Percy Hatfield	15,682	61.27	+28.43
Progressive Conservative	Robert de Verteuil	5,147	20.11	-0.71
Liberal	Jeewen Gill	3,057	11.94	-30.89
Green	Adam Wright	942	3.68	+1.45
Libertarian	Dan Dominato	400	1.56	+0.28
Family Coalition	Lee Watson	241	0.94	
Freedom	Andrew Brannan	124	0.48	
Total valid votes		25,593	100.00	
Total rejected, unmarked and declined ballots		225	0.87	
Turnout		25,818	30.35	
Eligible voters		85,075		
New Democratic gain from Liberal		Swing		+14.57
Source: Elections Ontario

== Personal life ==
Hatfield married Gale Simko in 1975, and they have two children and six grandchildren.
