= Pat Sturn =

Canadian portrait photographer

- Born: October 1910; Romania
- Died: March 15, 2011 (aged 100); Windsor, Ontario

Pat Sturn (October 1910 – March 15, 2011) was a Romanian-born Canadian portrait photographer.

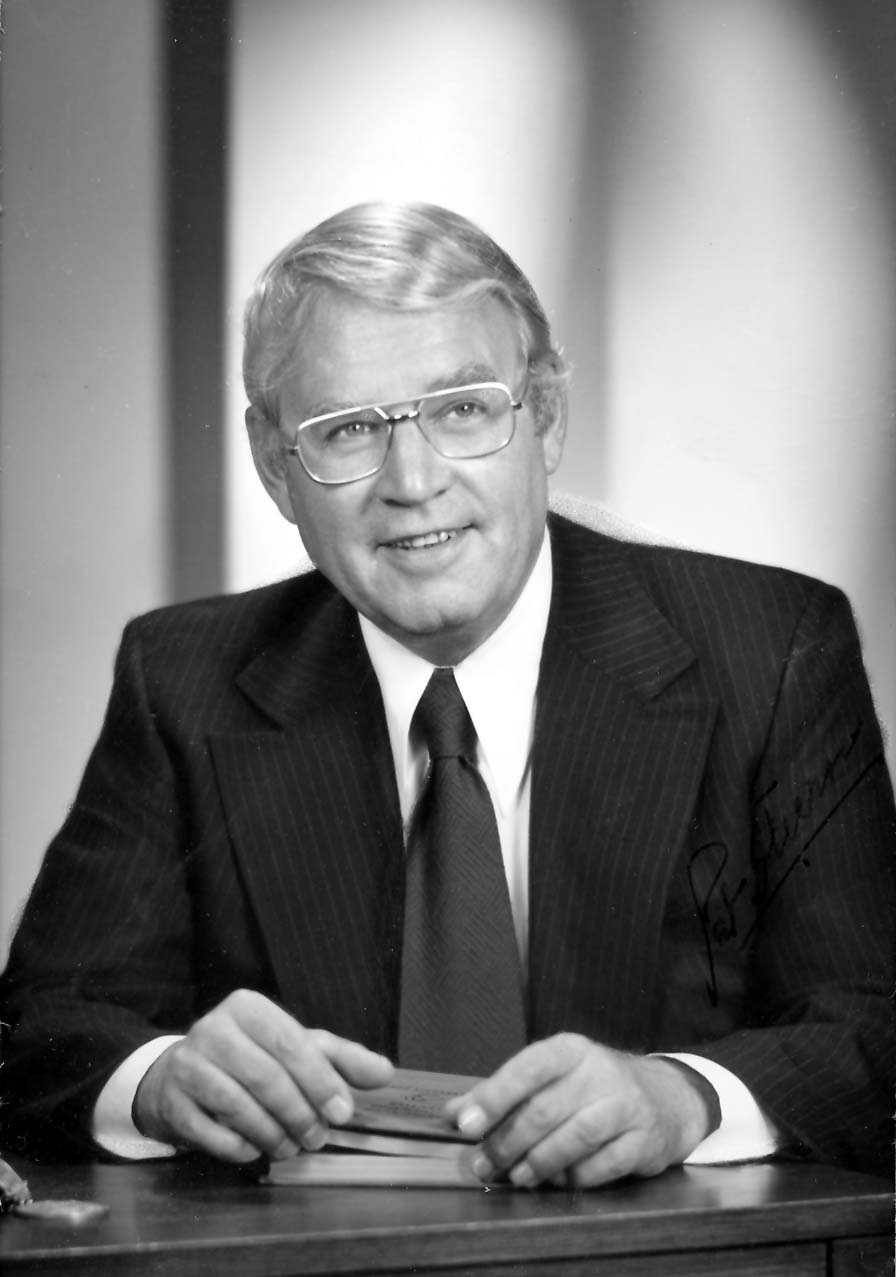
Portrait of Windsor mayor Bert Weeks by Pat Sturn

== Life ==
Sturn came to Windsor, Ontario during the early 1930s. She worked with photographer Will Browne and took over his studio in 1947. Sturn retired in 1981.

She died at the age of 100 at the Metropolitan campus of the Windsor Regional Hospital.

Sturn donated most of her estate to support arts programs at the University of Windsor.

The life of Sturn and opera singer Emilia Cundari are portrayed in the chamber opera Pat & Emilia.

The 20 minute short film/documentary Imagining Angels was produced by Canadian Arts Productions in 2014, based on the workshop process and production of the chamber opera Pat & Emilia It debuted at the Windsor International Film Festival and was chosen to screen at the Toronto Short Film Festival in March 2015.
