= Oscar Fleming =

Canadian lawyer and politician (1862-1944)

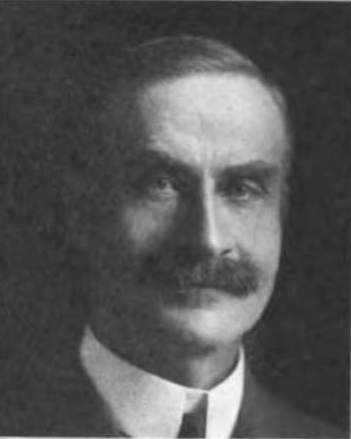

Mayor of Windsor
- In office 1891–1893

Personal details
- Born: Oscar Ernest Fleming; March 17, 1862; Milton, Canada West
- Died: November 29, 1944 (aged 82); Toronto, Ontario
- Spouse: Caroline Maud Drake (m. 1890)
- Occupation: Lawyer, politician

Oscar Ernest Fleming (March 17, 1862 – November 29, 1944) was a lawyer and politician in Ontario, Canada. He was mayor of Windsor from 1891 to 1893.

== Biography ==
The son of Samuel Fleming and Sophia M. Harwood, he was born in Milton, Halton County, Canada West and was educated in Windsor. He articled in law in Toronto, was called to the bar in 1885 and set up practice in Windsor. Fleming served two years on the local school board and three years on Windsor town council. He was the last mayor for the town of Windsor and the first mayor after Windsor became a city.

Fleming also served as vice-president of the McAplin Consumers Tobacco Company and as a director for the Standard Paint and Varnish Company of Windsor and of the Windsor Turned Works Company. With his brothers, he was the owner of an office building in Windsor. He was also grand marshal of the Grand Lodge of Ontario.

In 1890, Fleming married Caroline Maud Drake.

In 1919, he became president of the Canadian Deep Waterways and Power Association, an association to promote the building of a seaway connecting the Great Lakes to the Atlantic Ocean.

In 1929, he moved to New York City.

Oscar Fleming died in Toronto on November 29, 1944.
