= Wayne Lessard =

Canadian politician

Ontario MPP
- In office 1997–1999
- Preceded by: Dave Cooke
- Succeeded by: Riding abolished
- Constituency: Windsor—Riverside
- In office 1990–1995
- Preceded by: Mike Ray
- Succeeded by: Dwight Duncan
- Constituency: Windsor—Walkerville

Personal details
- Born: January 12, 1956 (age 70) Windsor, Ontario
- Party: New Democrat
- Occupation: Lawyer

Wayne Lessard (born January 12, 1956) is a former politician in Ontario, Canada. He was a New Democratic Party Member of Provincial Parliament (MPP) from 1990 to 1995, and again from 1997 to 1999.

== Background ==
Lessard was educated at the University of Windsor, and worked as a barrister and solicitor. In 1986, he has operated a private law practice specializing in workplace safety, real estate, criminal defence and other matters. He also served as an Assistant Crown Attorney and legal counsel for the Corporation of the City of Windsor.

== Politics ==
He was elected to the Ontario legislature in the 1990 provincial election, defeating incumbent Liberal Mike Ray by over 4,000 votes in the riding of Windsor—Walkerville. The NDP won its first majority government in this election. Lessard was appointed as parliamentary assistant from 1990 to 1995.

The NDP were defeated in the 1995 provincial election, and Lessard lost his seat to Liberal Dwight Duncan by 380 votes. He returned to the legislature two years later after winning a by-election in Windsor—Riverside, called after the resignation of Dave Cooke.

The province's electoral boundaries were radically altered between 1995 and 1999, and in the 1999 provincial election Lessard was forced to face Dwight Duncan again in the new riding of Windsor—St. Clair. Despite having the support of the Canadian Auto Workers, he lost by more than 4,000 votes.

== After politics ==
Lessard returned to his legal practice in Windsor for a short time and then became a Prosecutor for the City of Windsor.
