= Cecil E. Jackson =

17th Mayor of Windsor, Canada

Cecil E. Jackson (1872–1956) was the 17th mayor of the city of Windsor, Ontario, Canada who served from 1927 to 1930.

== Jackson Park ==
In Windsor there is a park named Jackson Park which was named after Cecil. E. Jackson. The park is said to be the most beautiful in the city of Windsor, attracting many tourists every year.

== See also ==
- List of mayors of Windsor, Ontario
