= 2010 Essex County municipal elections =

Local election in Ontario, Canada

Essex County, Ontario County Council Elections were held on October 25, 2010 in conjunction with municipal elections across the province.

== Essex County Council ==
Essex County Council consists of the 7 mainland mayors of Essex County and their seven deputy mayors. Pelee Island is considered a "separate township," and is not represented on County council but is included on this list.

Position	Elected
Amherstburg Mayor	Wayne Hurst
Amherstburg Deputy Mayor	Ron J. Sutherland
Essex Mayor	Ron McDermott
Essex Deputy Mayor	(position abolished)
Kingsville Mayor	Nelson Santos
Kingsville Deputy Mayor	Tamara Stomp
Lakeshore Mayor	Tom Bain
Lakeshore Deputy Mayor	"Big" Al Fazio
LaSalle Mayor	Ken Antaya
LaSalle Deputy Mayor	Mark Carrick
Leamington Mayor	John Paterson
Leamington Deputy Mayor	Charlie Wright
Tecumseh Mayor	Gary McNamara
Tecumseh Deputy Mayor	Cheryl M. Hardcastle

== Amherstburg ==
Mayoral Candidate	Vote	%
Wayne Hurst (X)	4,757	
Rick Fryer	4,535	

== Essex ==
Mayoral Candidate	Vote	%
Ron McDermott (X)	3,885	
Ron Rogers	3,509	
Paul Miner	866	

== Kingsville ==
Mayoral Candidate	Vote	%
Nelson Santos (X)	3,041	
Katherine Gunning	2,860	
Chris Lewis	1,710	
James Shean	417	

== Lakeshore ==
Mayoral Candidate	Vote	%
Tom Bain (X)	8,235	
Vic Vogler	3,350	

== LaSalle ==
Mayoral Candidate	Vote	%
Ken Antaya	6,730	
Gary Baxter (X)	3,849	

== Leamington ==
Mayoral Candidate	Vote	%
John Paterson	4,039	
John Adams (X)	2,683	
Ted Wigfield	1,879	

== Tecumseh ==
Mayoral Candidate	Vote	%
Gary McNamara (X)	Acclaimed	

== Pelee (separated township) ==
Mayoral Candidate	Vote	%
Richard Masse (X)	Acclaimed	
