= Frank Wansbrough =

Frank Wansbrough (May 28, 1919 – February 19, 2005) was a business owner and politician in Ontario, Canada. He served as mayor of Windsor from 1970 to 1974.

The son of William and Mary Wansbrough, he served in the Royal Canadian Air Force. Before entering municipal politics, Wansbrough owned Frank Wansbrough Camera Shop. In 1976, he opened Frank Wansbrough Plaza Travel. He married Marjorie Doerr, who predeceased him.

From 1947 to 1960, Wansbrough coached the Alpha Kai Omega (AKO) fraternity junior men's basketball team, winning Canadian championships in 1948 and 1960.

When Wansbrough ran for reelection as mayor in 1974, the initial vote count had him 300 votes ahead of Bert Weeks. However, there had been an error in counting votes and the final tally had Weeks the winner by 749 votes.
