= Ernest S. Wigle =

Ernest S. Wigle (March 5, 1859 – October 5, 1947) was a lawyer and political figure in Ontario. He was mayor of Windsor, Ontario from 1905 to 1909 and from 1937 to 1938.

He was born in Essex County, and was educated in Galt. Wigle was called to the bar in 1887. He served as lieutenant-colonel for the 18th Battalion of the Canadian Expeditionary Force during World War I.
