= Walker Road =

- Essex County Road 11
- Length: 40 km (25 mi); The southernmost 28 km (16 mi) are designated as County Road 11, the rest are unsigned, in the City of Windsor
- Location: Windsor, Oldcastle, Tecumseh, Amherstburg, McGregor, Essex, Harrow
- North end: Riverside Drive
- South end: Essex County Road 20

Walker Road is one of the busiest roads in Windsor, Ontario. It has an average annual daily traffic (AADT) level of 32,000 cars per day at the CP Rail crossing.

== History ==
The road is named after Hiram Walker, a distillery baron. The CP Rail crossing where Walker Road meets Grand Marais Road and the Chrysler Canada Windsor plant is the location where the Tornado of 1946 cut through and reached its peak intensity (F4).

Today, the road is very busy, servicing mainly industries and businesses along the road, with an interchange with E.C. Row Expressway. It begins at the Hiram Walker distillery and continues southerly past the Chrysler Canada minivan plant and the Windsor Airport.

Outside the City of Windsor, Walker Road was designated as a "Windsor Suburban Road", with its shield remaining the same, but with Windsor Suburban replacing "Essex County". In 1998, the Windsor Suburban Roads Commission was disbanded and the road reverted to Essex County.

Upgrades were made to Walker Road in the mid-2000s as part of the Windsor Gateway Project, including a grade separation at the CP rail crossing to reduce traffic congestion.

According to 2024 Windsor Police Service statistics, crossings at Walker Road included 3 of the 10 most dangerous intersections in the city, based on the number of traffic collisions. Walker Road's intersection with Provincial Road was the third-most dangerous, followed by the intersection with Howard Avenue, and the intersection with the E.C. Row Expressway was tenth-most dangerous.

== In the field ==
At the Highway 401 overpass (which is the city limits for Windsor), the road gains the designation of Essex County Road 11. It does not have direct access to Highway 401, but it does intersect with Provincial Road (County Road 46) which has an interchange with Highway 401 approximately 500 metres southeast of Walker Road.

The road is dead straight for 17 km, before swinging southeast (concurrent with County Road 18) towards Harrow, Ontario, its final terminus.

== See also ==
- List of Essex County Roads
- County Road 20

=== Former provincial highways ===
- Highway 2
- Highway 18
- Highway 18A
- Highway 98
- Highway 107
- Highway 114
