= Grand Marais Road =

Road in Windsor, Ontario, Canada

- Length: 8 km (5.0 mi)
- Location: Windsor, Essex County
- East end: Pillette Road
- West end: Huron Church Road/Highway 3 and Lambton Road

Grand Marais Road (French for "Big Marsh Road") is a road that travels through Windsor, Ontario. Its use and significance has dwindled considerably following the completion of the E.C. Row Expressway.

== History ==
The intersection with Walker Road is the site where the Tornado of 1946 touched down for a second time and reached its peak intensity of F4.

Grand Marais Road used to be in one piece, linking Huron Church Road in the southwest with Pillette Road in the east, following Turkey Creek fairly closely (hence the name "Big Marsh Road").

Once E.C. Row Expressway was constructed, parts of the road were closed off and torn up. They are listed below, heading westbound:

- Just east of the intersection with Plymouth Drive and Walker Road, Grand Marais Road turns quickly south to meet Plymouth (which was intended to handle through traffic towards the east end of Windsor in the 1970s), with two lanes being closed off and used as a parking space for residents nearby. The pavement on the northernmost two westbound lanes is much older than the rest, showing evidence of this (despite one lane being torn up and grassed over, a sidewalk being laid down along the road...)
- Intersection with Walker Road, east-bound-only traffic could exit the road. Memorial Drive to the north is now a bike trail. nearby residential streets allow access for drivers wanting to continue along Grand Marais Rd. In the early 2000s, the eastbound-only portion of Grand Marais Rd. was completely closed off.
- West of Howard Avenue, the road leads to Zalev's Scrap Yard. It used to meet the tracks at a grade crossing, until E.C. Row Expressway's bridges were constructed. The road was truncated to Zalev's in the east, and is now a driveway to the shopping plaza to the west. It continues as West Grand Boulevard following Turkey Creek very closely through built-up residential areas, with signs leading drivers back to Grand Marais Road (which it parallels closely as well).
- At the Dougall Road interchange with E.C. Row Expressway, the road's traffic is diverted onto Bruce Avenue (a quiet residential street), while a small segment of the road continues to a hotel parking lot. it was closed when the interchange's cloverleaf ramps were built in the late 1960s, due to how close the road is to the ramps.

From Bruce Avenue, the road continues much as it did before the expressway was built, with bike lanes along much of its path to its terminus with Huron Church Road.

== Today ==
The road is lightly used, and is a collector road that feeds major arterial roads nearby. It travels through several residential neighbourhoods, such as South Windsor.

== West Grand Boulevard ==
West Grand Boulevard is a derivative street that parallels Grand Marais (located just north of Turkey Creek) between Huron Church Road and Dougall Avenue. The road ranges from a collector road to a driveway, a bike path and a sidewalk. The road is discontinuous in sections, linked by trails and sidewalks. The road changes sides (from the south bank to the north bank) near Rankin Avenue (a residential street), with the street on the south bank named "West Grand Court".

== See also ==
- List of Essex County Roads
- County Road 20

=== Former Provincial Highways ===
- Highway 2
- Highway 18
- Highway 18A
- Highway 98
- Highway 107
- Highway 114
