= Ontario Peninsula =

Peninsula and salient in Canada

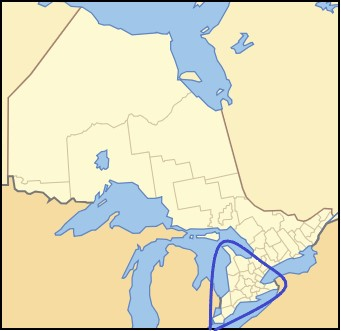
Location of the Ontario Peninsula

The Ontario Peninsula is the southernmost part of the province of Ontario and of Canada as a whole. It is bounded by Lake Huron on the west, Lake Ontario on the east, and Lake Erie on the south. At its tip, it is separated from Michigan by the Detroit and St. Clair rivers, as well as Lake St. Clair. The peninsula also includes the Bruce and Niagara peninsulas, one projecting into Lake Huron and the other projecting towards New York, from which it is separated by the Niagara River.

The corner of the peninsula that lies on Lake Ontario is known as the Golden Horseshoe and forms Canada's largest population centre. Other large cities include London and Windsor.

== Climate ==
Like other parts of southern Canada, the Ontario Peninsula enjoys warm or hot summers often passing 30 °C (86 °F) and rarely 40 °C (104 °F) during extreme heatwaves. During the summer, the peninsula has normal thunderstorm activity, including severe thunderstorms that can have hail, damaging winds, and even tornadoes during peak season. It has cold winters, and snowfall can be abundant, particularly in the affected Snowbelt locations. However, there are many winter thaw periods that break the entrenched cold. The Ontario Peninsula has a humid continental climate; specifically, most of it falls into the Köppen climate classification Dfb except for Essex County, Chatham-Kent, and parts of the Greater Toronto and Hamilton Area and the Niagara Peninsula, which are within the Dfa zone. However, the entire peninsula is near the Dfa/Dfb borderline.

== History ==
Several Indigenous peoples lived on the Ontario Peninsula before European colonization, such as the United Nations of Ojibwe, Ottawa, and Potawatomi, also called the Council of Three Fires, Huronia (or Wendake), and the Neutral Confederacy. In the 1600s, Southern Ontario would be colonized by France, with particular efforts to build alliances with each of the nations in the region they called the Pays d'en Haut, including setting up a mission in the Wendat (Huron) capital of Ossossané in what is now Simcoe County. These alliances were crucial as the French were perpetual enemies of the Haudenosaunee, with their country, Iroquoia, situated just east of Lake Ontario. Although every Indigenous nation was hit hard by outbreaks of disease, some of the biggest changes came during the Beaver Wars, which only came to an end in 1701 at the signing of the Great Peace of Montreal. In the aftermath, Wendake, the Neutral Confederacy, and Petun Country were destroyed, and demographic shifts saw the Ojibweg, notably those who were originally from around the Mississagi River, move onto the lands immediately north of Lake Ontario; these Anishinaabe would adopt the name "Mississauga." It is from them that the British bought land as part of the 1784 Between the Lakes Treaty to grant to the Mohawk people as part of the Haldimand Proclamation, after the Seven Years' War, establishing the Six Nations of the Grand River.

Later, the Ontario Peninsula would experience much of the fighting during the War of 1812, including the Americans invading it and burning York (now called Toronto). After the war, population and trade boomed, and the Welland Canal was built.

When the British divided the Province of Canada into separate provinces, Toronto became the capital of Ontario and eventually became Canada's main economic centre.

== Most populous entities ==
By each definition, Toronto or its corresponding entity is the most populous not only in the Ontario Peninsula but also in Canada as a whole.

=== Most populous metropolitan areas ===
Rank (2016)	Rank (2011)	Geographic name	Type	Population (2016)	Population (2011)	Change
1	1	Toronto (Mississauga, Brampton, Markham, Vaughan)	CMA	5,928,040	5,583,064	+6.18%
2	2	Hamilton (Burlington)	CMA	747,545	721,053	+3.67%
3	3	Kitchener–Waterloo–Cambridge	CMA	523,894	496,383	+5.54%
4	4	London	CMA	494,069	474,786	+4.06%
5	5	St. Catharines–Niagara (Niagara Falls, Welland)	CMA	406,074	392,184	+3.54%
6	6	Oshawa (Whitby, Clarington)	CMA	379,848	356,177	+6.65%
7	7	Windsor (Lakeshore)	CMA	329,144	319,246	+3.10%
8	8	Barrie (Innisfil)	CMA	197,059	187,013	+5.37%
9	9	Brantford (Brant)	CMA	134,203	135,501	−0.96%
10	10	Chatham-Kent	CA	102,042	104,075	−1.95%
11	11	Sarnia (St. Clair)	CA	96,151	97,131	−1.01%
12	12	Norfolk	CA	64,044	63,175	+1.38%
13	13	Leamington (Kingsville)	CA	49,147	49,765	−1.24%
14	14	Woodstock	CA	40,902	37,754	+8.34%
15	15	Midland (Tay, Penetanguishene)	CA	35,859	35,419	+1.24%
16	16	Owen Sound (Georgian Bluffs)	CA	31,820	32,092	−0.85%
17	17	Stratford	CA	31,465	30,903	+1.82%
18	18	Centre Wellington	CA	28,191	26,693	+5.61%
19	19	Collingwood	CA	21,793	19,241	+13.26%
20	20	Wasaga Beach	CA	20,675	17,537	+17.89%
21	21	Tillsonburg	CA	15,872	15,301	+3.73%
22	22	Ingersoll	CA	12,757	12,146	+5.03%

=== Most populous municipalities ===
Rank (2016)	Municipality	Municipal status	Land area (km^{2}, 2011)	Growth rate 2011–2016	Population (2016)	Population (2011)	Population (2006)	Population (2001)	Population (1996)
1	Toronto	City	630.2	4.46%	2,731,571	2,615,060	2,503,281	2,481,494	2,385,421
2	Mississauga	City	292.4	1.14%	721,599	713,443	668,549	612,925	544,382
3	Brampton	City	266.3	13.31%	593,638	523,911	433,806	325,428	268,251
4	Hamilton	City	1,117.2	3.26%	536,917	519,949	504,559	490,268	467,799
5	London	City	420.6	4.83%	383,822	366,151	352,395	336,539	325,669
6	Markham	City	212.6	9.03%	328,966	301,709	261,573	208,615	173,383
7	Vaughan	City	273.5	6.22%	306,233	288,301	238,866	182,022	132,549
8	Kitchener	City	136.8	6.42%	233,222	219,153	204,668	190,399	178,420
9	Windsor	City	146.3	2.99%	217,188	210,891	216,473	209,218	197,694
10	Richmond Hill	City	101.0	5.11%	195,022	185,541	162,704	132,030	101,725
11	Oakville	Town	138.9	6.20%	193,832	182,520	165,613	144,738	128,405
12	Burlington	City	185.7	4.29%	183,314	175,779	164,415	150,836	136,976
13	Oshawa	City	145.68	6.6%	159,458	149,607	141,590	139,051	134,364
14	Barrie	City	77.4	4.22%	141,434	135,711	128,430	103,710	79,191
15	St. Catharines	City	96.1	1.30%	133,113	131,400	131,989	129,170	130,926
16	Guelph	City	87.2	8.30%	131,794	121,688	114,943	106,170	95,821
17	Cambridge	City	113.0	2.50%	129,920	126,748	120,371	110,372	101,429
18	Whitby	Town	146.53	5.2%	128,377	122,022	111,184	87,413	73,794
19	Ajax	Town	67.1	9.19%	119,677	109,600	90,167	73,753	64,430
20	Milton	Town	363.2	30.54%	110,128	84,362	53,939	31,471	32,104
21	Waterloo	City	64.0	6.28%	104,986	98,780	97,475	86,543	77,949
22	Chatham-Kent	Municipality	2,458.1	-1.95%	101,647	103,671	108,177	107,341	109,950
23	Brantford	City	72.5	4.11%	97,496	93,650	90,192	86,417	86,417
24	Pickering	City	231.6	3.44%	91,771	88,721	87,838	87,139	78,989
25	Niagara Falls	City	209.7	6.11%	88,071	82,997	82,184	78,815	76,917
26	Newmarket	Town	38.3	5.31%	84,224	79,978	74,295	65,788	57,125
27	Sarnia	City	164.7	-1.07%	71,594	72,366	71,419	70,876	72,738
28	Caledon	Town	688.2	11.84%	66,502	59,460	57,050	50,605	39,893
29	Norfolk County	City	1,607.6	1.38%	64,044	63,175	62,563	60,847	60,534
30	Halton Hills	Town	276.3	3.64%	61,161	59,013	55,289	48,184	42,390
31	Aurora	Town	49.8	4.21%	55,445	53,203	47,629	40,167	34,857
32	Welland	City	81.1	3.28%	52,293	50,631	50,331	48,402	48,411

=== Most populous population centres ===
Rank	Population centre	Size group	Population in 2016	Population in 2011
1	Toronto	Large urban	5,429,524	5,144,412
2	Hamilton	Large urban	693,645	671,008
3	Waterloo	Large urban	470,015	446,295
4	London	Large urban	383,437	365,715
5	Windsor	Large urban	287,069	277,970
6	St. Catharines–Niagara	Large urban	229,246	220,616
7	Barrie	Large urban	145,614	140,383
8	Guelph	Large urban	132,397	122,457
9	Milton	Large urban	101,715	75,880
10	Brantford	Medium	98,179	94,269
11	Sarnia	Medium	72,125	73,044
12	Welland–Pelham	Medium	62,388	60,540
13	Chatham	Medium	43,550	44,676
14	Georgetown	Medium	42,123	40,185
15	St. Thomas	Medium	41,813	40,973
16	Woodstock	Medium	40,404	37,443
17	Leamington	Medium	32,991	32,520
18	Stouffville	Small	32,634	24,654
19	Stratford	Medium	31,053	30,516
20	Orangeville	Medium	30,734	29,007
21	Bradford	Small	29,862	23,024
22	Keswick–Elmhurst Beach	Small	26,757	26,002
23	Bolton	Small	26,378	27,108
24	Midland	Medium	24,353	23,791
25	Innisfil	Small	23,992	20,365
26	Owen Sound	Small	22,032	22,354
27	Fergus	Small	20,767	19,335
28	Collingwood	Small	20,102	17,986
29	Alliston	Small	18,809	15,343
30	Wasaga Beach	Small	17,808	15,378
31	Tillsonburg	Small	15,594	14,933
32	Port Colborne	Small	15,037	15,079
33	Fort Erie	Small	14,621	14,490
34	Strathroy	Small	14,401	14,391
35	Simcoe	Small	13,922	13,383
36	Amherstburg	Small	13,910	13,724
37	New Hamburg	Small	13,595	11,709
38	Angus–Borden CFB-BFC	Small	12,640	10,132
39	Ingersoll	Small	12,587	11,977
40	Paris	Small	12,310	11,722
41	Beamsville	Small	11,834	10,655
42	Elmira	Small	10,161	9,677
43	Wallaceburg	Small	10,098	10,127
44	Caledonia	Small	9,674	9,871
45	Acton	Small	9,462	9,506
46	Binbrook	Small	8,794	4,926
47	Crystal Beach	Small	8,524	8,059
48	Kincardine	Small	8,315	7,802
49	Shelburne	Small	8,126	5,841
50	Port Elgin	Small	7,862	7,304
51	Aylmer	Small	7,621	7,249
52	Goderich	Small	7,536	7,327
53	Sutton	Small	7,531	6,694
54	Listowel	Small	7,530	6,828
55	Essex	Small	7,446	7,127
56	Hanover	Small	7,413	7,240
57	King	Small	6,970	4,603
58	St. Marys	Small	6,951	6,373
59	Port Dover	Small	6,161	5,710
59	Dunnville	Small	5,759	5,267
61	Corunna	Small	5,686	5,892
62	Chippawa	Small	5,620	5,246
63	Smithville	Small	5,489	4,842
64	Tay	Small	5,408	5,217
65	Petrolia	Small	5,375	5,144
66	Tottenham	Small	5,143	4,720
67	Mount Albert	Small	4,925	4,044
68	Meaford	Small	4,910	4,860
69	Tilbury	Small	4,768	4,675
70	Mississauga Beach	Small	4,662	4,349
71	Exeter	Small	4,649	4,210
72	Mount Forest	Small	4,643	4,466
73	Rockwood	Small	4,629	4,290
74	Nobleton	Small	4,614	2,554
75	Mitchell	Small	4,573	4,257
76	Walkerton	Small	4,517	4,403
77	Blenheim	Small	4,344	4,595
78	Caledon East	Small	4,282	2,706
79	Delhi	Small	4,240	4,172
80	Ayr	Small	4,171	3,909
81	Vineland	Small	4,074	3,807
82	Stayner	Small	4,029	3,844
83	Dorchester	Small	3,911	4,003
84	Beeton	Small	3,730	3,730
85	Southampton	Small	3,678	3,382
86	St. George	Small	3,255	3,124
87	Wellesley	Small	3,246	2,929
88	Ballantrae	Small	3,223	2,994
89	Waterford	Small	3,132	3,027
90	Clinton	Small	3,049	2,979
91	Ridgetown	Small	3,002	2,986
92	Tavistock	Small	2,955	2,784
93	Hagersville	Small	2,939	2,579
94	Virgil	Small	2,937	2,734
95	Wingham	Small	2,934	2,875
96	Wheatley	Small	2,898	2,934
97	Norwich	Small	2,852	2,707
98	Harrow	Small	2,710	2,713
99	Schomberg	Small	2,691	2,321
100	Grand Bend	Small	2,684	2,564
101	Seaforth	Small	2,680	2,627
102	Erin	Small	2,647	2,523
103	Palmerston	Small	2,624	2,599
104	Durham	Small	2,609	2,635
105	Lucan	Small	2,541	2,014
106	Thornbury	Small	2,485	2,363
107	Dresden	Small	2,451	2,385
108	Wyoming	Small	2,361	2,248
109	Arthur	Small	2,333	2,314
110	Elmvale	Small	2,314	2,248
111	Forest	Small	2,277	2,389
112	Colchester	Small	2,229	2,104
113	Port Stanley	Small	2,148	2,270
114	Glencoe	Small	2,126	2,065
115	Thamesford	Small	2,116	1,953
116	Drayton	Small	2,111	1,775
117	Dundalk	Small	2,046	1,988
118	Wiarton	Small	1,989	2,034
119	St. Jacobs	Small	1,988	1,891
120	Carlisle	Small	1,869	1,879
121	McGregor	Small	1,859	1,474
122	Ilderton	Small	1,856	1,700
123	Chesley	Small	1,843	1,895
124	Mount Brydges	Small	1,842	1,834
125	Harriston	Small	1,797	1,700
126	Parkhill	Small	1,737	1,853
127	Cayuga	Small	1,713	1,622
128	Oro Station–Hawkestone	Small	1,691	1,682
129	Everett	Small	1,670	1,645
130	Grand Valley	Small	1,643	1,476
131	Milverton	Small	1,576	1,476
132	Watford	Small	1,536	1,491
133	Caledon	Small	1,482	1,572
134	Dutton	Small	1,368	1,300
135	Plattsville	Small	1,366	1,143
136	West Lorne	Small	1,337	1,415
137	Mildmay	Small	1,219	1,178
138	Markdale	Small	1,216	1,175
139	Cookstown	Small	1,214	975
140	Claremont	Small	1,202	1,175
141	Stevensville	Small	1,179	1,054
142	Creemore	Small	1,170	1,147
143	Bourget	Small	1,169	1,080
144	Belmont	Small	1,140	1,026
145	Lucknow	Small	1,121	1,095
146	New Dundee	Small	1,119	1,219
147	Bayfield	Small	1,112	951
148	Port Rowan	Small	1,102	1,069
149	Stoney Point	Small	1,087	1,146
150	Paisley	Small	1,045	998
151	Palgrave	Small	1,044	1,002
152	Jarvis	Small	1,037	913
