= Ontario Highway 18 =

Former Ontario provincial highway

King's Highway 18

- Highway 18 Limited-access King's Highway Former highways

Route information
- Maintained by Ministry of Transportation of Ontario
- Length: 76.0 km (47.2 mi) (1997)
- Existed: June 11, 1930–January 1, 1998

Major junctions
- North end: Highway 3 in Windsor
- East end: Highway 3 / Highway 77 (Talbot Street / Erie Street) in Leamington

Location
- Country: Canada
- Province: Ontario
- Counties: Essex
- Major cities: Windsor, LaSalle, Amherstburg, Malden Center, Harrow, Kingsville, Ruthven, Leamington

Highway system
- Ontario provincial highways; Current; Former; 400-series
← Highway 17B	→ Highway 19
Former provincial highways
Highway 18A →

King's Highway 18, commonly referred to as Highway 18, was a provincially maintained highway in the Canadian province of Ontario, located entirely within Essex County. Since 1998, the majority of the former route has been known as Essex County Road 20. The route travelled at the southernmost point in Canada, along or near the shoreline of the Detroit River and Lake Erie between Windsor and Leamington, with Highway 3 as the terminus at both ends. The former route provides access to the communities of LaSalle, Amherstburg, Malden Centre, Harrow, Kingsville and Union.

The original alignment of Highway 18 followed a completely different routing for the first 18 months of its existence than it would for the following 50 years. As it was first designated in 1930, Highway 18 provided a shortcut between Windsor and Tilbury. By early 1932, this route was renumbered as Highway 2, and a new highway between Windsor and Leamington via Amherstburg designated as Highway 18. Expansion of the highway to four lanes between Windsor and Amherstburg was first proposed in the mid-1960s, but not undertaken until the mid-1980s. In the mid-1990s, the route was determined to no longer be of provincial significance and was transferred—or downloaded—to the municipalities and township that it lay within. On April 1, 1997, Highway 18 was downloaded through LaSalle, as well between Union and Leamington; it was temporarily rerouted to end at Highway 3 in Ruthven. On January 1, 1998, the entire route was transferred to Essex County.

== Route description ==
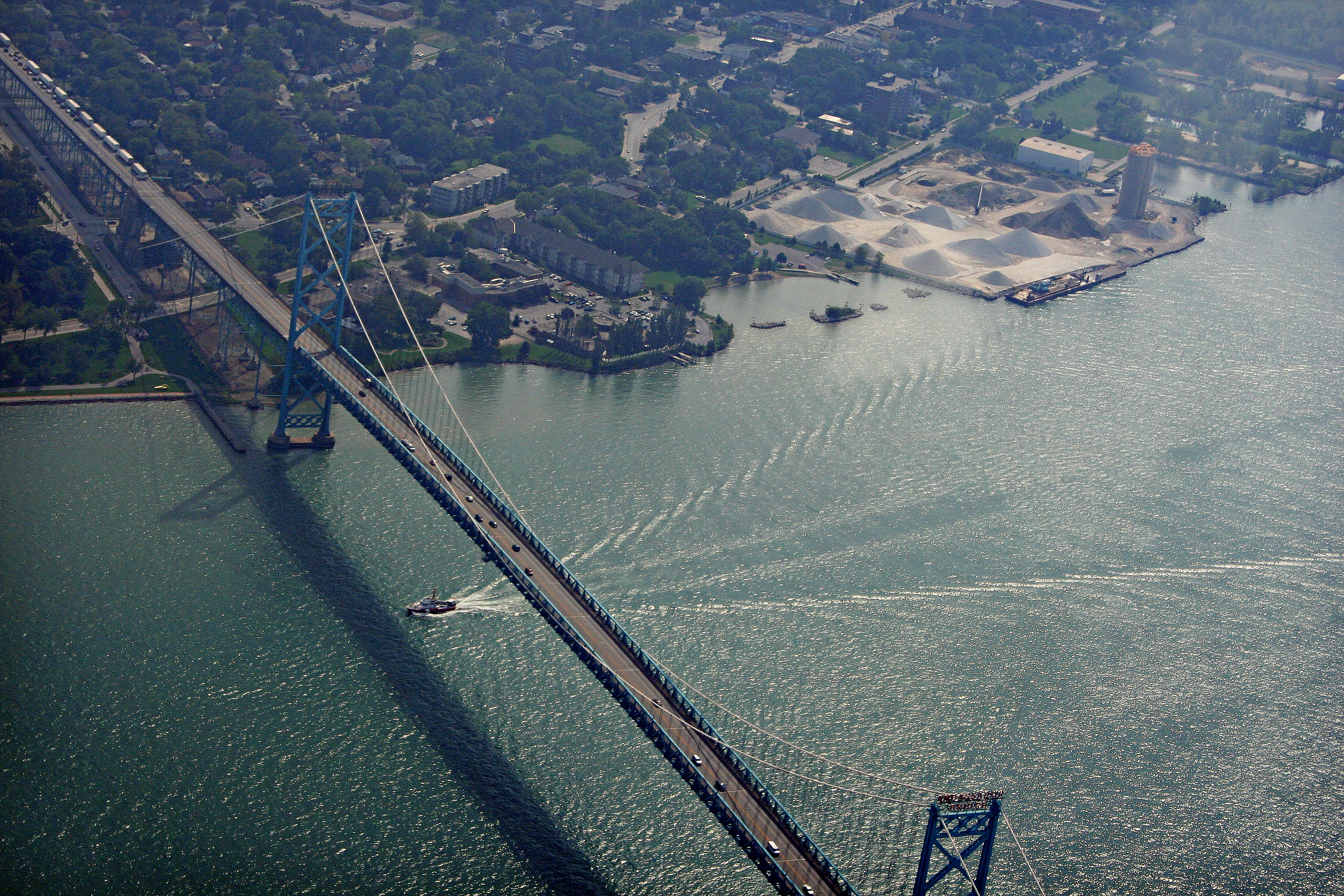
Until the E.C. Row Expressway was completed in the early 1980s, Highway 18 followed Sandwich Street (pictured here passing beneath the Ambassador Bridge).

Highway 18 was an 76.0-kilometre (47.2 mi) route that travelled along or near the shoreline of the Detroit River and Lake Erie between Windsor and Leamington in Southwestern Ontario. In addition to its provincial designation, it also carried the Heritage Highway designation for its entire length, the African-Canadian Heritage Tour from Windsor south to Essex County Road 10 (Middle Side Road), and the Great Sauk Trail between Windsor and Amherstburg. Today it is mostly known as Essex County Road 20; it is four-lanes from Windsor to Amherstburg, and generally two lanes for the remainder of its routing.

As it existed prior to 1997, Highway 18 was maintained by the Ministry of Transportation (MTO) outside of the city of Windsor; the city was responsible for the portion within its boundaries, which the route encounters at Morton Drive. In addition, portions of the route through Amherstburg, Harrow, Kingsville and Leamington were maintained under Connecting Link agreements. It began at Huron Church Road in Windsor and followed the E.C. Row Expressway west. The expressway ended as it curved south at Ojibway Parkway, with Highway 18 taking on that name thereafter. Ojibway Parkway, a divided four lane limited-access road, ends at the Windsor city limits at Morton Drive. The former route follows Front Road into the town of LaSalle, where it shifts west and crosses Turkey Creek. Front Road travels near the shoreline of the Detroit River through LaSalle, with riverfront properties lining the western side of the road. Across the river are the southern suburbs of Detroit, Michigan.

South of LaSalle, the former route of Highway 18 enters the city of Amherstburg at Essex County Road 3 (Malden Road). It makes several sweeping curves and crosses the mouth of the River Canard, which is the southernmost river in Canada. After passing through the centre of Amherstburg, where Highway 18 was maintained under a Connecting Link agreement between Brunner Avenue and Lowes Side Road, the route follows the shores of the Detroit River once more before curving east inland. It crosses Big Creek twice, with Knapps Island lying in the middle, before encountering the village of Malden Centre. Essex County Road 50, which formed Highway 18A until 1978, loops south from Malden Centre to Colchester before meeting Highway 18 again on the west side of Kingsville.

Former Highway 18 facing east towards Leamington in 2015

Now several kilometres inland from Lake Erie, the former route of Highway 18 travels through farmland, making a brief jog south before returning to a straight eastward route into the municipality of Essex and the community of Harrow. Within Harrow, the former route is named King Street, and was maintained under a Connecting Link agreement between Roseborough Road and Herdman Street. Continuing east, it passes Cedar Creek Conservation Area and crosses Cedar Creek at Essex County Road 23 (Arner Townline), which serves as the boundary between Essex and Kingsville. Entering the urban boundary of Kingsville, it meets the eastern terminus of Essex County Road 50 (Heritage Road). Highway 18 was maintained under a Connecting Link agreement in Kingsville between Fox Lane and the Chrysler Canada Greenway, a rail trail along a former branch of the Chesapeake and Ohio Railway.

East of Kingsville, the former route of Highway 18 travels parallel to and north of Lake Erie, providing access to lakeside properties. Several greenhouses are located nearby, a small percentage of the over 815 hectares (2,000 acres) of land occupied by them in the Leamington area. At the hamlet of Union, Highway 18 turned north to end at Highway 3 in Ruthven. However, this routing was only in place between April and December 1997. Prior to then, it entered Leamington at Albuna Townline, travelling along Seacliff Drive West to Erie Street, where it turned north. The highway ended at the intersection of Talbot Street (Highway 3) and Erie Street in downtown Leamington, from which Highway 77 continued north to Comber. The portion of the route from Forest Avenue and Seacliff Drive to Talbot Street was maintained under a Connecting Link agreement.

== History ==
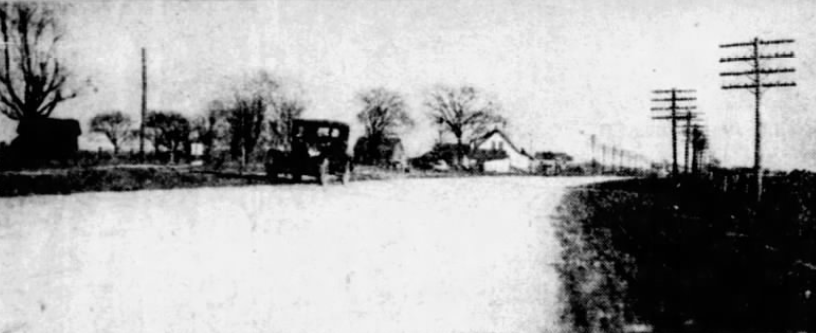
The new Highway 18 curve entering Windsor in late 1931, prior to being renumbered as Highway 2

=== Windsor–Tilbury ===
The original alignment of Highway 18 followed a completely different routing for the first 18 months of its existence than it would for the following 50 years. As it was first designated in 1930, Highway 18 provided a shortcut between Windsor and Tilbury. In anticipation of the opening of the Ambassador Bridge, as well as the nearby Detroit–Windsor Tunnel, Windsor and the surrounding townships sought road improvements between Windsor and Maidstone to alleviate traffic along Talbot Road and bypass or separate several level crossings of the Michigan Central Railway (MCR) beginning in early 1929. The province chose to designate a new right-of-way adjacent to and north of the MCR in July of that year, and spent the next several months constructing the cut-off (now known as Provincial Road) from Howard Avenue to north of Maidstone. By 1930, Highway 2 had been rerouted to begin at the ferry docks in downtown Windsor, following Ouellette Avenue to Tecumseh Road, then east to and south along Howard Avenue; the short segment near Maidstone became Highway 2A.

Meanwhile, the province set out to build a third highway into Windsor. Essex County had designated County Road 19 along Cabana Road (now Division Road) and Baseline Road to Tilbury on April 19, 1928, and soon thereafter the DPHO promised to take it over as a new provincial highway. Highway 18 was officially designated on June 11, 1930 along the route. Several changes were made to the provincial highway system in Essex County in February 1932. Since the route of Highway 18 was shorter than the route of Highway 2 between Windsor and Tilbury, the newly renamed Department of Highways (DHO) renumbered Highway 18 as Highway 2, while the old route of Highway 2 became Highway 2A. At the same time, the Highway 18 designation was applied along a new provincial highway between Windsor and Leamington.

=== Windsor–Leamington ===
1931 Ontario Road Map, showing the original route of Highway 18 between Windsor and Tilbury

On November 17, 1931, Minister of Highways Leopold Macaulay announced that the province would take over the Front Road and Essex County Road 2 between Windsor and Leamington following calls by towns in southern Essex County. This took place one month later on December 16. Within Windsor, the new highway began at the intersection of Ouellette Avenue and Riverside Drive. From there it travelled west along Riverside Drive, Sandwich Street, and what is now the Ojibway Parkway. Several sections of the new highway were paved when the province took them over. The Front Road was paved between Windsor and Amherstburg by 1924, King Street in Harrow was paved between 1910 and 1912, and Seacliff Drive between Kingsville and Leamington was paved in 1925. The remainder of the route between Amherstburg and Kingsville, outside of Harrow, was unimproved.

Along with the new Highway 18 designation, which was applied in February 1932, the DHO undertook reconstruction of the unimproved portions of the route as a depression-relief project. As part of this work, several jogs were straightened and a new bridge constructed over Big Creek, bypassing the old route between Amherstburg and Malden Centre along what is now Meloche Road and Creek Road. Two sweeping curves were also built between Malden Centre and Harrow, and all unpaved sections were graded and gravel surfaced. Reconstruction of Highway 18 was completed and the route fully opened to traffic by September 30, 1932. Paving of the gravel sections of Highway 18 began in 1934. By the end of the year, the route had been paved between Amherstburg and Malden Centre, as well as between Harrow and Kingsville. The final gap of gravel between Malden Centre and Harrow was paved in 1936, and a new 76 m (250 ft) wooden bridge built over the River Canard along the right-of-way of the Sandwich, Windsor and Amherstburg Electric Railway.

The route of Highway 18 through Amherstburg originally followed Sandwich Street, Richmond Street and Dalhousie Street. Narrow streets and sharp turns resulted in frequent accidents, especially at the S-curve south of Park Street. Although this problem was recognised shortly after the highway was established, work to remedy it did not begin until 1958, when construction began on the Amherstburg diversion. On July 25, 1958, the DHO assumed the route of the future diversion, which was completed and opened to traffic on July 28, 1959; the former route via Richmond Street and Dalhousie Street was subsequently renumbered as Highway 18B.

=== Expansions and downloading ===
When Highway 18 was established, the entire route was two lanes wide. Twinning of what is today known as the Ojibway Parkway took place in the late 1930s and was one of the earliest examples of a divided highway in Ontario. The divided portion began at Sandwich Street and ended at an intersection on the north side of the Turkey Creek bridge. This section of Highway 18 was known as Main Street or the Seven Mile Road until it was renamed as the Ojibway Parkway at the beginning of 1973. The remainder of the route between Amherstburg and the Turkey Creek bridge was gradually widened over the course of 25 years. Beginning in June 1965, following several years of deferrals, the two lane Turkey Creek bridge was widened as part of work to expand Front Road to four lanes as far south as Gary Avenue. The new four lane bridge was opened officially on September 17, 1966. That year, the Southwestern Ontario Highway Planning Study was released, which recommended numerous changes to the highway network in Essex County. Among them was four-laning Highway 18 between Amherstburg and Windsor.

Former Highway 18 facing south at the River Canard bridge in 2015

On September 15 1970, the River Canard bridge experienced a structural failure and was taken out of service. It was replaced by a temporary bailey bridge that opened in January 1971. Planning for a replacement bridge to accommodate the widening of Highway 18 to four lanes had been underway since the early 1960s. Amherstburg council requested the new bridge have a 4.6 m (15 ft) clearance, compared with the 1 m (3 ft) clearance of the old bridge. The DHO refused, insisting a 3 m (10 ft) clearance would be adequate. In August 1972, after two years of discussions, the higher clearance was approved. Work on the new bridge and 1.9 km (1.2 mi) of approaches began in May 1973. It was opened to traffic in February 1974, and the bailey bridge subsequently disassembled. As part of the work, Highway 18 was widened to four lanes from 0.7 km (0.43 mi) south of the bridge to 1.1 km (0.68 mi) north of it.

Planning to remove the dangerous two lane Brunner Mond bridge in Amherstburg, the site of numerous accidents, was underway by the 1970s. The bridge crossed a Penn Central Railroad track midway between Texas Road and Brunner Avenue, and formed a major hurdle in the proposal to four lane Highway 18 between Amherstburg and LaSalle. On March 1, 1976, Minister of Transportation James Snow officially announced that the rebuilt highway would be four lanes wide. Work on the crossing began on July 11, 1977 and was completed by the end of the year.

Meanwhile in Windsor, construction of the E.C. Row Expressway was underway. Built to provide a ring road around Windsor, the expressway was opened as a two lane road between Ojibway Parkway and Huron Church Road on June 9, 1983. Starting with the 1982 Ontario Road Map, Highway 18 is shown as following the still-unopened E.C. Row Expressway to Huron Church Road. Construction to widen the west end of the E.C. Row Expressway to four lanes began in October 1989 and was completed in September, 1990.

Widening of 4.7 km (2.9 mi) of Highway 18 between Amherstburg and the River Canard bridge began on July 23, 1985, at a ground-breaking ceremony attended by Minister of Transportation Ed Fulton. Fulton personally intervened to ensure that the oft-deferred project be built. Construction to widen 8 km (5.0 mi) of the route from north of the River Canard bridge to south of the Turkey Creek bridge in LaSalle began in the spring of 1987.

As part of a series of budget cuts initiated by premier Mike Harris under his Common Sense Revolution platform in 1995, numerous highways deemed to no longer be of significance to the provincial network were decommissioned and responsibility for the routes transferred to a lower level of government, a process referred to as downloading. Highway 18 was downloaded east of Essex County Road 45 (Union Avenue, former Highway 107), a distance of 6.1 km (3.8 mi), on April 1, 1997. The 7.8 km (4.8 mi) portion of the route through LaSalle was transferred to that town on the same day. Essex County Road 45 (Union Avenue) was assumed in order to establish a logical eastern terminus for the route at Highway 3 in Ruthven. On January 1, 1998, the remainder of Highway 18 was downloaded and transferred to Essex County. Since 1998, the former route of Highway 18 has been known as Essex County Road 20.

== Suffixed routes ==
=== Highway 18A ===
Highway 18A
- Location: Malden Centre–Kingsville
- Length: 31.1 km (19.3 mi)
- Existed: April 13, 1938–July 1, 1978

Highway 18A was a 31.1-kilometre-long (19.3 mi) route that began and ended at Highway 18, travelling along the Lake Erie shoreline and through Colchester. It was the southernmost highway to ever exist in Canada, as the only one to travel south of the 42nd parallel. Highway 18A was assumed as a provincial highway on April 13, 1938. It was transferred to Essex County on January 1, 1978, and has since been known as Essex County Road 50.

=== Highway 18B (Ruthven) ===
Highway 18B
- Location: Union–Ruthven
- Length: 1.5 km (0.93 mi)
- Existed: April 13, 1938–July 1, 1978

Highway 18B was a short stub serving to connect Highway 18 with Highway 3 west of Leamington. It was assumed by the DHO on August 25, 1937. While initially gravel-surfaced, the highway was paved in 1944. Highway 18B was renumbered as Highway 107 in 1952. Highway 18 would briefly follow this route between April 1997 and January 1998.

=== Highway 18B (Amherstburg) ===
Highway 18B
- Location: Amherstburg
- Length: 2.1 km (1.3 mi)
- Existed: 1959–c. 1969

Dalhousie Street in 2015

A second Highway 18B existed through downtown Amherstburg in the 1960s, following the original route of Highway 18 along Richmond Street and Dalhousie Street.

== Major intersections ==
The following table lists the major junctions along Highway 18, as noted by the Ministry of Transportation of Ontario.

Division	Location	km	mi	Destinations	Notes
Windsor		0.0	0.0	Highway 3 (Huron Church Road)	To Ambassador Bridge to United States
Windsor		4.7	2.9	County Road 40	
Windsor–Essex boundary	Windsor–LaSalle boundary	5.7	3.5	Morton Drive	Windsor city limits; beginning of provincial jurisdiction
Essex	LaSalle	7.9	4.9	Laurier Drive	To Matchett Road and County Road 3 (Malden Road)
Essex	LaSalle–Amherstburg boundary	13.5	8.4	County Road 3 north (Malden Road)	River Canard, southern terminus of County Road 3
Essex	Amherstburg	19.1	11.9	County Road 10 east (Middle Side Road)	Edgewater Beach
Essex	Amherstburg	23.9	14.9	Richmond Street	
Essex	Amherstburg	25.4	15.8	Lowes Sideroad	
Essex	Amherstburg	35.2	21.9	County Road 50 south	Malden Centre, Formerly Highway 18A
Essex	Essex	37.8	23.5	County Road 9 north (Howard Avenue)	
Essex	Essex	39.9	24.8	County Road 41 south (Meadows Road)	
Essex	Essex	46.1	28.6	Roseborough Road	Beginning of Harrow Connecting Link agreement
Essex	Essex	46.5	28.9	County Road 13 south (Erie Road)	
Essex	Essex	46.9	29.1	County Road 11 north (Queen Street)	
Essex	Essex	47.7	29.6	Herdman Street	End of Harrow Connecting Link agreement
Essex	Essex–Kingsville boundary	54.8	34.1	County Road 23 (Arner Townline Road)	Arner
Essex	Kingsville	61.0	37.9	County Road 50 south (Heritage Road)	Formerly Highway 18A
Essex	Kingsville	62.0	38.5	County Road 29 (Division Road)	
Essex	Kingsville	67.8	42.1	County Road 45 (Union Avenue)	Union, Formerly Highway 107
Essex	Leamington	70.0	43.5	County Road 31 north (Albuna Townline Road)	Seacliffe
Essex	Leamington	73.7	45.8	Forest Avenue	Beginning of Leamington Connecting Link agreement
Essex	Leamington	73.9	45.9	County Road 20 (Seacliffe Drive)	
Essex	Leamington	76.0	47.2	Highway 3 (Talbot Street) Highway 77 north (Erie Street)	End of Leamington Connecting Link agreement
1.000 mi = 1.609 km; 1.000 km = 0.621 mi

== See also ==
- Ontario Highway 98
- List of numbered roads in Essex County
