= 18A (disambiguation) =

The 18A was a 2013 Argentine protest demonstration.

18A, 18-A, 18a or XVIII-A may also refer to:

- Air & Space 18A, a 1965 United States gyroplane
- Eighteen angstrom, a marketing term for a sub-2 nm process
- Highway 18A (Ontario)
- Nevada State Route 18A
- Soyuz 18a, a 1975 Soviet spacecraft mission
- Stalag XVIII-A, a German prisoner of war camp
- Volkswagen Type 18A, a 1949 special version made for the German police
