= Sun-Brite Foods =

Canadian food processing company

Sun-Brite Foods is a Canadian food processing and canning company headquartered in Ruthven, Ontario.

Sun-Brite supplies the food industry with processed tomatoes, and also sells canned and bottled consumer products under the brands Unico and Primo. As of 2016, Sun-Brite was Canada's largest tomato processor. In 2025 the company made 33 tomato-based products and processes thirteen kinds of beans, as well as producing dried pasta products.

== History ==
Sun-Brite was founded in 1973 by Onorio (Henry) Iacobelli and his wife, Lina, who bought an existing canning plant.

Sun-Brite purchased Unico (founded in 1917) in 1997. The Primo company (founded in 1956), with its Toronto pasta factory, was acquired from Kraft in 2006. In 2016, after Heinz closed down its ketchup plant in nearby Leamington, Sun-Brite began making ketchup under its Primo brand.

Sun-Brite has twice been fined for environmental infractions, once for releasing a large amount of processing water into the local drainage system without reporting it, and once for spreading processing waste on fields.

In 2020 the company employed 135 permanent employees at its plant in Ruthven, about 100 at each of its Primo and Unico plants in Toronto, as well as a few seasonal workers from Mexico. As of 2025, Sun-Brite imports most of its cans from the United States.
