= Scott Cooper =

Scott Cooper may refer to:

- Scott Cooper (baseball) (born 1967), American baseball player
- Scott Cooper (director) (born 1970), American actor, writer, and director
- Scott Cooper (football manager) (born 1970), English football manager
- Scott Cooper (born c. 1965), executive chef at Le Papillon restaurant, San Jose, California

== See also ==
- Athol Scott Cooper (1892–1970), English-born Australian politician
- James Scott Cooper (1874–1931), Canadian bootlegger
- Scott Couper (born 1970), American football player from Scotland
