= Mordellistena bicinctella =

Scientific classification
- Domain: Eukaryota
- Kingdom: Animalia
- Phylum: Arthropoda
- Class: Insecta
- Order: Coleoptera
- Suborder: Polyphaga
- Infraorder: Cucujiformia
- Family: Mordellidae
- Genus: Mordellistena
- Species: M. bicinctella

Binomial name
- Mordellistena bicinctella LeConte, 1862

Species of beetle

Mordellistena bicinctella is a beetle in the genus Mordellistena of the family Mordellidae. It was described in 1862 by John Lawrence LeConte. It is found in the Ontario Peninsula, the central United States, and Texas.
