= List of roads in Essex County =

List of roads in Essex County may refer to:

- List of county routes in Essex County, New Jersey
- List of highways in Essex County, New York
- List of numbered roads in Essex County, Ontario
