= Ontario Highway 114 =

Former Ontario provincial highway

Highway 114
- Malden Road
- Highway 114 Limited-access King's Highway Former highways

Route information
- Maintained by Essex County
- Length: 1.8 km (1.1 mi)
- Existed: 1920 (as Highway 2); 1953–1970
- History: Established 1920; Highway 2 1925–1929; Highway 2A 1929–1931; Highway 3A 1931–1938; Highway 98A 1938–1953; Highway 114 1953–1970; Decommissioned June 1, 1970

Major junctions
- South end: Highway 3 – Maidstone
- North end: Highway 98

Location
- Country: Canada
- Province: Ontario
- Major cities: Maidstone

Highway system
- Ontario provincial highways; Current; Former; 400-series
← Highway 112	→ Highway 115

King's Highway 114, commonly referred to as Highway 114, was a provincially maintained highway in the Canadian province of Ontario. It was one of the shortest highways ever assigned in the province, at just 1.8 kilometres (1.1 mi) in length. The route followed Malden Road for its entire length between Highway 3 and Highway 98. Part of the original provincial highway network created in 1920, Highway 114 was created in 1953 out of a route renumbering. Prior to 1953, it had been numbered Highway 2A from 1929 until 1931, Highway 3A from 1931 until 1938, and Highway 98A from 1938 until 1953. Today, Malden Road is an unnumbered local road.

== Route description ==
The former route of Highway 114, now known as Malden Road, is no longer maintained by the province nor by Essex County; it is a local road maintained by the Town of Tecumseh and the Town of Lakeshore. It is a narrow semi-rural township road, though fully paved and with houses along much of its path. Between Manning Road and Essex County Road 46, it is still signed as "HWY 114", though it was decommissioned in 1970.

The route begins in the south at former Highway 3 (Talbot Road), just north of the current alignment of that highway. It proceeds northeast through Maidstone, flanked by houses on both sides. Approaching Manning Road (Essex County Road 19), the route briefly passes through farmland. Just northeast of the intersection with Manning Road, the route ends at Middle Road (Essex County Road 46), formerly Highway 98. At 1.8 kilometres (1.1 mi), it was one of the shortest King's Highways ever assigned by the province.

== History ==
Despite its short length, Highway 114 had a tumultuous history of highway numbering. The route was initially assumed by the Department of Highways (DHO), predecessor to the modern Ministry of Transportation, as part of the establishment of a provincial highway network in 1920. On February 26, 1920, the Provincial Highway was established between Windsor and the Quebec border. The Provincial Highway would become Highway 2 in the summer of 1925, travelling concurrently with Highway 3 along Talbot Road into Windsor.

In 1929, Highway 2 was rerouted into Windsor along present-day North Talbot Road and Provincial Road, and as a result, the short cutoff along Malden Road became Highway 2A. However, this numbering would be short-lived. In 1930, the DHO assumed the present-day Essex County Roads 22 and 42 between Windsor and Tilbury via Belle River as Highway 18. However, this alternative route to Highway 2 was more direct, and consequently, the route of Highway 18 was renumbered as Highway 2 in 1931, while the former routing became Highway 2A; Malden Road was renumbered as Highway 3A as a result.

As part of a province-wide change to make through highway designations numerical only, the DHO redesignated Highway 2A between Windsor and Tilbury as Highway 98, and Highway 3A as Highway 98A in 1938. This numbering would remain in place until 1953, when the route would get a unique number as Highway 114. It remained this way until 1970, when Highway 98 was decommissioned in its entirety. Since Highway 114 served only to connect it with Highway 3, it was subsequently transferred to the township of South Sandwich, on June 1, 1970. Today, the former route forms a small portion of the much longer Malden Road.

== Major intersections ==
The following table lists the major junctions along Highway 114, as noted by the Ministry of Transportation of Ontario. The entire route is located in Essex County.

Location	km	mi	Destinations	Notes
Maidstone	0.0	0.0	County Road 34 (Talbot Road)	Routing of Highway 3 in 1970
	1.4	0.87	County Road 19 (Manning Road)	
	1.8	1.1	County Road 46 (Middle Road)	Highway 98 in 1970
1.000 mi = 1.609 km; 1.000 km = 0.621 mi
