= Detroit River Heritage Parkway =

The Detroit River Heritage Parkway is a tourist route in Essex County, Ontario, stretching from Windsor to Amherstburg. The designation was given by the Essex Region Conservation Authority, and placed along roads that travel closely to the Detroit River.

The road starts on Riverside Drive near Sandpoint Beach at the eastern end of the Detroit River, and travels through downtown Windsor and the Sandwich neighbourhood. It continues along Sandwich Street before meeting up with Ojibway Parkway, down along County Road 20, and leading to Amherstburg, showing places of natural and historical significance along the way.

The Detroit River is also the only river in North America to have both American Heritage River and Canadian Heritage River designations.
