= Ontario Highway 18A =

Former Ontario provincial highway

Highway 18A

- Highway 18A (in thick blue) as it appeared in the 1938–39 Ontario Road Map

Route information
- Auxiliary route of Highway 18
- Maintained by Ministry of Transportation of Ontario
- Length: 31.1 km (19.3 mi)
- Existed: April 13, 1938–July 1, 1978

Major junctions
- West end: Highway 18 in Malden Center
- East end: Highway 18 in Kingsville

Location
- Country: Canada
- Province: Ontario
- Counties: Essex
- Towns: Malden Center, Colchester, Kingsville

Highway system
- Ontario provincial highways; Current; Former; 400-series
← Highway 18	→ Highway 19

King's Highway 18A, commonly referred to as Highway 18A, was a provincially maintained highway in the Canadian province of Ontario. The 31.1-kilometre-long (19.3 mi) route began and ended at Highway 18, travelling along the Lake Erie shoreline and through Colchester. It was the southernmost highway to ever exist in Canada, as the only one to travel south of the 42nd parallel. Highway 18A was assumed as a provincial highway in 1938. It was transferred to Essex County in 1978, and has since been known as Essex County Road 50.

== Route description ==
Highway 18A was a short route that served the headland that protrudes into Lake Erie between Amherstburg and Kingsville in the southernmost part of Essex County. It began and ended at junctions with the former Highway 18, now Essex County Road 20, that are approximately 25.8 kilometres (16.0 mi) apart on that road. The west junction was at the community of Malden Centre, while the east junction was located on the western edge of Kingsville. The route itself was 31.1 kilometres (19.3 mi) long, detouring to the south along the shore of Lake Erie and passing through Colchester. Highway 18A was the southernmost highway in Canada, and the only one to travel south of the 42nd parallel.

== History ==
Highway 18A was first assigned during the late 1930s. Essex County council requested that the lakefront road between Malden Centre and Kingsville be taken over by the province and designated Highway 18A in June 1935. The Department of Highways (DHO), predecessor to the Ministry of Transportation, assumed the road on April 13, 1938. The gravel road was paved from Colchester to Kingsville in 1951, and from Malden Centre to Colchester in 1952. Following recommendations presented in the Selkirk Report in June 1976, the renamed Ministry of Transportation and Communications rebuilt the road to proper standards, including bypassing several corners; the bypassed route is now Twin Gables Drive and Dolson Road. Subsequently, the entire length was transferred to Essex County effective July 1, 1978. Essex County promptly resigned the route as Essex County Road 50. It is now also known as Heritage Road east of Colchester.

== Major intersections ==
The following table lists the major junctions along Highway 18A, as noted by the Ontario Department of Highways. The entire route was located in Essex County. Distances listed are from 1970.

Location	km	mi	Destinations	Notes
Malden Centre	0.0	0.0	Highway 18 – Amherstburg, Windsor	Now County Road 20
Colchester	12.9	8.0	County Road 13 north (Erie Road) – Harrow	
Kingsville	31.1	19.3	Highway 18 – Leamington	Now County Road 20
1.000 mi = 1.609 km; 1.000 km = 0.621 mi

== See also ==
- List of Essex County Roads
