= Ontario Highway 107 =

Former Ontario provincial highway

Highway 107
- Essex County Road 45
- Highway 107 Limited-access King's Highway Former highways

Route information
- Maintained by The Ministry of Transportation of Ontario
- Length: 1.5 km (0.93 mi)
- Existed: 1953–June 1, 1970

Major junctions
- South end: Highway 18 (now Essex County Road 20) in Ruthven
- North end: Highway 3 (now Essex County Road 34) in Ruthven

Location
- Country: Canada
- Province: Ontario
- Counties: Essex County, Ontario
- Major cities: Ruthven

Highway system
- Ontario provincial highways; Current; Former; 400-series
← Highway 105	→ Highway 108
Former provincial highways
← Highway 106

King's Highway 107, commonly referred to as Highway 107, was a provincially maintained highway in the Canadian province of Ontario situated midway between the towns of Kingsville and Leamington. The route was one of the shortest highways to exist in the province, at a length of 1.5 kilometres (0.93 mi). It has been through several re-numberings throughout its history but is now known as Essex County Road 45 or Union Avenue. The route began at Highway 18 and travelled north to Highway 3 at Ruthven.

Highway 107 was known as Highway 18B from 1937 until 1952. It was decommissioned in 1970, but was later briefly assigned as the eastern leg of Highway 18 in 1997. The highway was once again decommissioned in 1998. Since then, as well as between 1970 and 1997, the route has been known as Essex County Road 45.

== Route description ==
Highway 107 was a short highway that provided a connection between Highway 18 and Highway 3, southeast of Windsor. At 1.8 kilometres (1.1 mi), it was one of the shortest signed provincial highways to exist in Ontario. Both termini are visible from any point on the route. Today, the former highway is known as Union Avenue or Essex County Road 45. It begins in the community of Union, progressing north from Essex County Road 20, formerly Highway 18. The road travels into the village of Ruthven, ending at Essex County Road 34, the former routing of Highway 3. The entire route lies west of Leamington within the town of Kingsville in Essex County. The southern terminus of the route is within a kilometre of the Lake Erie shoreline. Despite having a rural cross-section, the entire length of the former highway is fronted by residential properties.

== History ==
The route of Highway 107 was initially numbered in 1937 as Highway 18B, serving to connect Highway 18 with Highway 3 west of Leamington. While initially gravel-surfaced, the highway was paved some time in the mid-1940s. Highway 18B was renumbered as Highway 107 in 1952, and remained unchanged until it was decommissioned as a provincial highway and transferred to Gosfield South Township on June 1, 1970. The township promptly handed responsibility for the road to Essex County.

Between 1970 and 1997, the former highway was known as Essex County Road 45. Highway 18 was briefly signed along the route in 1997 following the transfer of a portion of it between County Road 45 and Leamington on April 1. It was rerouted along County Road 45 to end at Highway 3 for the remainder of the year. However, the entirety of Highway 18 was transferred to Essex County on January 1, 1998, resulting in the route once again becoming Essex County Road 45, which it is known as today.

== Major intersections ==
The following table lists the major junctions along Highway 107, as noted by the Ministry of Transportation of Ontario. The entire route is located in Essex County.

Location	km	mi	Destinations	Notes
Union	0.0	0.0	County Road 20 – Leamington, Kingsville	Formerly Highway 18
Ruthven	1.5	0.93	County Road 34 – Leamington, Essex	Formerly Highway 3
1.000 mi = 1.609 km; 1.000 km = 0.621 mi
