= List of numbered roads in Essex County =

List of county roads

The numbered roads in Essex County account for 1,503 lane kilometres (933.9 mi) of roads in the Canadian province of Ontario. These roads (Note: In Ontario, all roads are legally known as highways. However, road is the more prevalent term for common use. The Ontario Municipal Act defines a highway as any road, street or bridge that is not a Provincial Highway.) include King's Highways that are signed and maintained by the province, as well as county roads under the jurisdiction of the County of Essex. The third type of existing roadway in the county is locally maintained municipal roads, many of which are concession roads and sidelines; these are beyond the scope of this article.

Odd-numbered roads are generally north–south, with numbers increasing from west to east; even-numbered roads are generally east–west roads, with numbers increasing from north to south, with some exceptions. County roads are not signed within the city limits of Windsor. There are also several unrelated roads named "Malden Road". In 2002, the City of Windsor and the Town of Tecumseh swapped land with each other. Windsor gained land west of Banwell Road, including Windsor International Airport and Tecumseh Mall. Portions of several county roads within the land given to Windsor lost their designation as a result of this exchange.

The 43 numbered routes provide year-round access to the rural areas of the county, with roads within Windsor under a separate authority. The longest road in Essex County is County Road 20, which stretches 76.0 kilometres (47.2 mi) between Windsor and Leamington via the shoreline of the Detroit River and Lake Erie.

== King's Highways ==
There are 129.9 kilometres (80.7 mi) of provincially-maintained highways in Essex County, known as "provincial highways" or "King's Highways," a term adopted in 1930. As in the rest of Ontario, the provincially maintained highways in Essex County are designated with a shield-shaped sign topped with a crown. The highway number is in the centre, with the word ONTARIO below. These signs are known as shields, but may be referred to as reassurance markers. Provincially maintained highways generally have greater construction standards than municipally or locally maintained roads.

== County roads ==
There are 40 numbered county roads in Essex County. County roads are signed with a flowerpot-shaped sign, as are most regional and county roads in Ontario. The road number appears in the centre of the sign, with the word ESSEX above and the word COUNTY below. Like King's Highways, these signs are known as shields.

== Roads ==
=== King's Highways ===
King's Highways in Essex County
Route	Western/Southern Terminus	Eastern/Northern Terminus	Length	Communities	Comments
Highway 3	Ambassador Bridge in Windsor	Highway 77 in Leamington (continues east as Essex County Road 33)	51.1 km (31.8 mi)	Windsor, Essex, Leamington	
Highway 77	Highway 3 in Leamington (continues south as Erie Street North)	Highway 401 west of Tilbury (continues north as Essex County Road 35)	22.6 km (14.0 mi)	Leamington, Comber	
Highway 401	County Road 20 (Ojibway Parkway / E. C. Row Expressway) in Windsor	East of County Road 42 (Mill Street West) in Tilbury (east of Exit 56)	56.2 km (34.9 mi)	Windsor, Tilbury	

=== County roads ===
County roads are referred to on signage as Essex County Road X. The following table lists existing numbered roads maintained by the County of Essex.

Essex County Roads
Route	Name(s)	Western/Southern Terminus	Eastern/Northern Terminus	Length		Communities	Comments
Route	Name(s)	Western/Southern Terminus	Eastern/Northern Terminus	km	mi	Communities	Comments
Essex County Road 1	Wheatley Road, Queen Street, Baptiste Road	Dead end at a factory plant parking lot just south of Wheatley	CR 2	27.7	17.2	Wheatley, Tilbury	Dual designation of Essex County Road 1, and Chatham-Kent Road 1.
Essex County Road 2; (west)	Old Tecumseh Road	Windsor city limits	CR 22	10.0	6.2	Tecumseh, St. Clair Beach, Puce, Emeryville, Lakeshore.	Is split in two parts: From CR 21 to County Road 22 in Puce, and then from County Road 22 in Belle River to Essex-Kent County border (with CR 1). Formerly Highway 39 until 1961, when the Pike Creek Bypass/E.C. Row Expressway bypass of Pike Creek was finished, from Banwell Road to CR 2/22 Intersection. Former bridge approach is now used as a driveway/boat launch for the bordering house, next to the current roadway. Continues as Chatham-Kent Road 36.
Essex County Road 2; (east)	Tecumseh Road, Notre Dame Street, 2nd Concession Road	Notre Dame Street (CR 22)	Essex-Kent County border (with CR 1)	22.8	14.2	Emeryville, Belle River, Deerbrook, Pointe-Aux-Roches (all now a part of Lakeshore).	Is split in two parts: From CR 21 to County Road 22 in Puce, and then from County Road 22 in Belle River to Essex-Kent County border (with CR 1). Formerly Highway 39 until 1961, when the Pike Creek Bypass/E.C. Row Expressway bypass of Pike Creek was finished, from Banwell Road to CR 2/22 Intersection. Former bridge approach is now used as a driveway/boat launch for the bordering house, next to the current roadway. Continues as Chatham-Kent Road 36.
Essex County Road 3	Malden Road	River Canard at CR 20 (15 km/9 mi)	Windsor City limit	9.5	5.9	Lasalle, Windsor	A north-south semi-rural road in Essex County. It travels from Highway 3 (Huron Church Road) in Windsor to its terminus with Essex County Road 20 in River Canard. Like several other nearby county roads, Malden Road was listed as a Windsor Suburban Road until 1998. There are other Malden Roads in Essex County. County Road 12 between County Road 11 (Walker Road) and County Road 34 (Talbot Road North) is named Malden Road. The road next north is named North Malden Road, while the road next south is named South Malden Road. Another Malden Road exists northwest in Maidstone between County Road 8 and Manning Road. An Old Malden Road exists between 14th Concession and 12th Concession/Walker Sideroad.
Essex County Road 5; (south)	Meloche Road	CR 18	CR 16	1.2	0.75	Amherstburg	Is currently discontinuous due to expansion of the Amherstburg quarry.
Essex County Road 5; (north)	Thomas Road	Essex-Amherstburg Trail / Thomas Road	CR 10	2.1	1.3	Amherstburg	Is currently discontinuous due to expansion of the Amherstburg quarry.
Essex County Road 6	Todd Lane	CR 3	Highway 3	2.0	1.2	Lasalle	Can be thought of as a continuation of County Road 40 and County Road 42
Essex County Road 7	Huron Church Line	Highway 3	CR 9 (Howard Avenue)	6.4	4.0	Lasalle	
Essex County Road 8	Townline Road	CR 3 in River Canard	CR 1	50.8	31.6	Lasalle, Amherstburg, Tecumseh, Essex, Lakeshore, Kingsville, Leamington	Cuts across the mid-line of Essex County, almost directly half-way. Road heads due-east from River Canard in the west, straight towards Essex, and continuing all the way to the County boundary with Chatham-Kent. The road is appropriately named "Townline Road", as it acts as the boundary line with all of the current municipalities of Essex County. It also cuts Essex County nearly in half, as it is situated halfway between Lake St. Clair and Lake Erie.
Essex County Road 9	Howard Avenue (7th Concession Road)	CR 20	Windsor City limits/Highway 3			Lasalle, Tecumseh	Acts as a townline between Lasalle and Tecumseh.
Essex County Road 10	Middle Side Road	CR 20 (Front Road)	CR 11 (Walker Road) / Essex town limit			Amherstburg, McGregor	
Essex County Road 11	Walker Road	Windsor City limit	CR 20			Tecumseh, Essex, Amherstburg, McGregor, Harrow	Close to the Chrysler Canada Greenway, acts as a townline between Amherstburg and Essex. Has a brief concurrency with CR 18.
Essex County Road 12	Malden Road (unrelated to CR 3)	CR 11 (Walker Road)	CR 23 (Arner Townline)			Gesto, Essex	
Essex County Road 13	Erie Street	CR 20 in Harrow	CR 50 in Colchester			Harrow, Colchester, Essex	Can be thought of as an extension of CR 11
Essex County Road 14	Mersea Road	CR 27, just north of Cottam	CR 1			Kingsville, Cottam, Albuna, Leamington	
Essex County Road 15	Edgars Sideroad, Campbell Sideroad, South Malden Road, Marsh Road	CR 8	CR 11, just north of Harrow			Essex, Harrow, Gesto	
Essex County Road 16	Alma Street	CR 20	CR 5			Amherstburg	One of Essex County's shortest county roads
Essex County Road 17	10th Concession	Windsor, Tecumseh	Windsor city limit at Highway 401			CR 46	Used to continue to CR 42, however, annexation by the City of Windsor, moved the terminus south to the new Windsor city limit on the north side of Highway 401.
Essex County Road 18	Pike Road, 7th Concession Road, Road 4, Mersea Road 4	20	Highway 77			Amherstburg, Essex, Kingsville, Leamington	
Essex County Road 19	Manning Road	Riverside Drive	CR 8			Tecumseh, St. Clair Beach, Lakeshore, Maidstone, Essex	One of the busiest roads in any category in Essex County.
Essex County Road 20	Front Road, Highway 18, Main Street, Seacliff Drive	Morton Drive / Windsor city limit	CR 33	69.3	43.1	Windsor, Lasalle, River Canard, Amherstburg, Essex, Harrow, Kingsville, Ruthven, Leamington	Formerly Highway 18, continues as Ojibway Parkway in Windsor. It is also the Detroit River Heritage Parkway from intersection with E.C. Row Expressway to just south of Amherstburg. Former alignment for the River Canard bridge is now known as Sari Lane.
Essex County Road 21	Brighton Road	CR 2	CR 42			St. Clair Beach, Tecumseh, Lakeshore	
Essex County Road 22	E.C. Row Expressway, Highway 2, County Road 22, Tecumseh Road, Notre Dame Street	Windsor city limit (just east of CR 43 (Banwell Road))	CR 42 (just south of Belle River)	19.7	12.2	Windsor, Tecumseh, St. Clair Beach, Puce, Emeryville, Belle River, Lakeshore	Formerly Highway 39 from July 11, 1934, until 1970, when Highway 2 absorbed it entirely. Was re-routed along the Pike Creek Bypass portion of E.C. Row Expressway (section from Manning Road to CR 2/22 intersection) in 1961. One of the busiest roads in any category in Essex County. Was Highway 2 from 1970-1998.
Essex County Road 23	Arner Townline, Gosfield Townline, Fairview Avenue, Naylor Sideroad	CR 50	CR 46			Arner, Essex, Lakeshore	Acts as a townline between Essex and Kingsville
Essex County Road 25	Puce Road, 12-13 Sideroad	CR 22	CR 46			Puce, Lakeshore	
Essex County Road 27	Belle River Road, Cottam Sideroad	CR 2 (Belle River)	CR 23			Belle River, Woodslee, Cottam, Lakeshore, Kingsville, Essex.	
Essex County Road 29	Division Road, South Talbot Road	CR 34, south of Cottam	CR 20			Kingsville, Cottam	Main road leading from Highway 3 into downtown Kingsville.
Essex County Road 31	Albuna Townline, French Line Road, St. Joachim Road, West Ruscom River Road	CR 2 in Deerbrook	CR 20 in Ruthven	30.1	18.7	Kingsville, Leamington, Ruthven, St. Joachim, Lakeshore, Deerbrook	The only county road to touch both lakes, Lake Erie and Lake St. Clair, under a single designation.
Essex County Road 33	Leamington By-Pass, Bevel Line, Point Pelee Road	Intersection with Highways 3 and 77 in Leamington	Point Pelee National Park entrance	11.3	7.0	Leamington, Point Pelee	Currently in two parts, from Highway 3/77 intersection, to CR 34, and again from CR 20 to Point Pelee Nat. Park. Leamington intends to connect the two via an "East End Arterial Road" to alleviate growth on the east side of town.
Essex County Road 34	Talbot Road, Highway 3, County Road 34	Highway 3, Maidstone	CR 1, in Wheatley	47.0	29.2	Tecumseh, Maidstone, Lakeshore, Essex, Kingsville, Cottam, Ruthven, Leamington, Wheatley.	Former alignment of Highway 3, until the Essex By-Pass (current Highway 3) was completed, in 1981. The Leamington By-Pass was completed in 1997, and Highway 3 was routed along that road, being truncated at Highway 77.
Essex County Road 35	Comber Sideroad	Highway 77-Highway 401 interchange, just north of Comber	CR 2			Pointe-Aux-Roches/Stoney Point, Comber	
Essex County Road 37	Gracie Sideroad, Simpson Sideroad, Manery Road	CR 20	CR 2			No towns of major significance	
Essex County Road 39	Lighthouse Sideroad, 1st Concession, Tisdelle Drive	CR 2	Lighthouse Cove			Lighthouse Cove	
Essex County Road 40	Sprucewood Avenue	Windsor city limit	CR 3			Windsor, Lasalle	Can be thought of as a continuation of CR 6 and CR 42
Essex County Road 41	Meadows Road	CR 20	CR 50			Amherstburg, Essex	Can be thought of as a continuation of CR 9 (Howard Avenue)
Essex County Road 42	Division Road, County Road 42, Old Highway 2	Windsor city limit	Tilbury	37.6	23.4	Windsor, Tecumseh, Lakeshore, Belle River, St. Joachim, Tilbury	Formerly Highway 18 from June 11, 1930, until re-numbered Highway 2 on December 16, 1931, when it gained its current routing. CR 42 became Highway 2, until 1970 before being re-routed via CR 22 in Belle River. Fully turned back in 1998. Continues as Chatham-Kent Road 2.
Essex County Road 43	Banwell Road, 11th Concession Road	E.C. Row Expressway	CR 46			Windsor, Tecumseh	Acts as the border between Windsor and Tecumseh
Essex County Road 43; (original)	Jefferson Road	E.C. Row Expressway	Division Road (CR 42)			Windsor, Tecumseh	In the early 1970s, Windsor Airport was expanded, and Pilette Road and Jefferson Road were both closed off to traffic, permanently. Jefferson is used as an auxiliary parking lot for Chrysler Canada's excess production at times.
Essex County Road 45	Union Avenue	CR 20	CR 34			Kingsville, Ruthven, Union	Formerly Highway 18B (1937–1953), then Highway 107 from 1953 onward, before being turned back in 1970. Temporarily re-transferred to provincial control as Highway 18 for a few months during a re-routing to bring people towards the newly opened Leamington By-Pass (Highway 3), before being turned back in its entirety in 1998, being reverted to CR 45.
Essex County Road 46	Provincial Road, Middle Road, County Road 46	Windsor city limit	CR 1	45.4	28.2	Windsor, Tecumseh, Maidstone, Lakeshore, Woodslee, Ruscom Station, Comber	Formerly Highway 2A (1929–1938), then Highway 98 until 1970. It was the longest provincial highway lost to downloading until 1997.
Essex County Road 48	Oak Street	Intersection with CR 34 and Fraser Road	Erie Street (Formerly part of Highway 77)			Leamington	Somewhat busy, travels through downtown Leamington, by the Heinz Canada Ketchup Factory. Has a 5-way traffic signal at its western terminus.
Essex County Road 50	Heritage Road	CR 20	CR 20			Amherstburg, Colchester, Kingsville	Formerly Highway 18A from April 13, 1938, until being turned back in 1979, southernmost highway in Canada. Acts as a loop to CR 20, former Highway 18. Hwy 18A was turned back in 1983. Was fully paved by 1952. One Rand McNally map lists CR 50 as continuing north past CR 20 and CR 18, ending at Alma Street.
Essex County Road 117	Lauzon Parkway	Windsor city limit	CR 42/CR 17 Intersection			Windsor, Tecumseh	Originally was a spur of CR 17 (Lauzon Road), now a separate county road in its own right. Now under the jurisdiction of the City of Windsor.
Former Route

=== Windsor Suburban Roads ===
Windsor Suburban Roads were a special designation given to certain county roads in Essex County that were close to the City of Windsor. The following roads had part or all of their routes listed as "Windsor Suburban Roads":

- County Road 2
- County Road 3
- County Road 6
- County Road 7
- County Road 8
- County Road 9
- County Road 11
- County Road 17
- County Road 19
- County Road 21
- County Road 25
- County Road 34
- County Road 40
- County Road 42
- County Road 46
- County Road 117

The roads were managed by the "Windsor Suburban Roads Commission" until 1998, when Windsor became a single-tier municipality. The Suburban Roads reverted to Essex County.

== See also ==
- List of roads in Windsor, Ontario
