= James Scott Cooper =

James Cooper (1874 in London, Ontario – 1931) was a Canadian bootlegger who gained prosperity through the prohibition era. Cooper became one of the wealthiest and most powerful bootleggers in Canada.

== Bootlegging ==
Ontario voted for prohibition of alcohol in October 1919. This law lay out that residents were allowed to purchase liquor for private use only. Saloons and bars were closed, and the only way to consume alcohol was in the privacy of the individual's home. Because Cooper discovered there was nothing to prevent Ontario distilleries from completing any orders not originating in Ontario, he opened an office across the river in Detroit. By taking orders by phone from customers in Windsor, Cooper was allowed to produce and provide alcohol to his customers. He worked on a commission basis for Hiram Walker, and for a director for Dominion Distillery products. On average he managed to make one dollar per case for his work.

== Farming innovation ==
Although much of Cooper's fortune was made through bootlegging, he was also one of the leading innovators of farming in southern Ontario. In 1918, Cooper bought 105 acres (0.42 km^{2}) of farmland near Belle River. He initiated the widespread practice of deep ploughing and tilled the acreage so that spring crops could be ready approximately two weeks sooner. He installed a new style of field draining that used clay tiles. Tiling was an expensive and unknown method at the time. The successful experiment was quickly noticed by neighbouring farms and word spread rapidly through southern Ontario. Cooper constructed a tiling factory on his own farm, and was soon producing 10,000 tiles and 20,000 bricks per day. Cooper also built the Belle River Seed and Grain Company.

James Scott Cooper built several structures, including a mansion in Walkerville that has since been torn down, and a two-story building in Belle River. Formally the Cooper Hotel, the Cooper Court was constructed in 1920 at a cost of $40,000. This local bar is still open for business. He was one of the few wealthy men in the late 1920s and 1930s to keep his wealth through the 1929 stock market crash, as he did not invest in the stock market.

== Disappearance and reported death ==
In 1931 Cooper booked passage aboard the S.S. Deutschland bound for Europe. On February 10, 1931, his wife Helen sent a telegram to Windsor, Ontario, indicating that he fell overboard and that the body had not been recovered. His body was never found, and there has been speculation that he may have faked his own death.
