= Colchester, Ontario =

Colchester
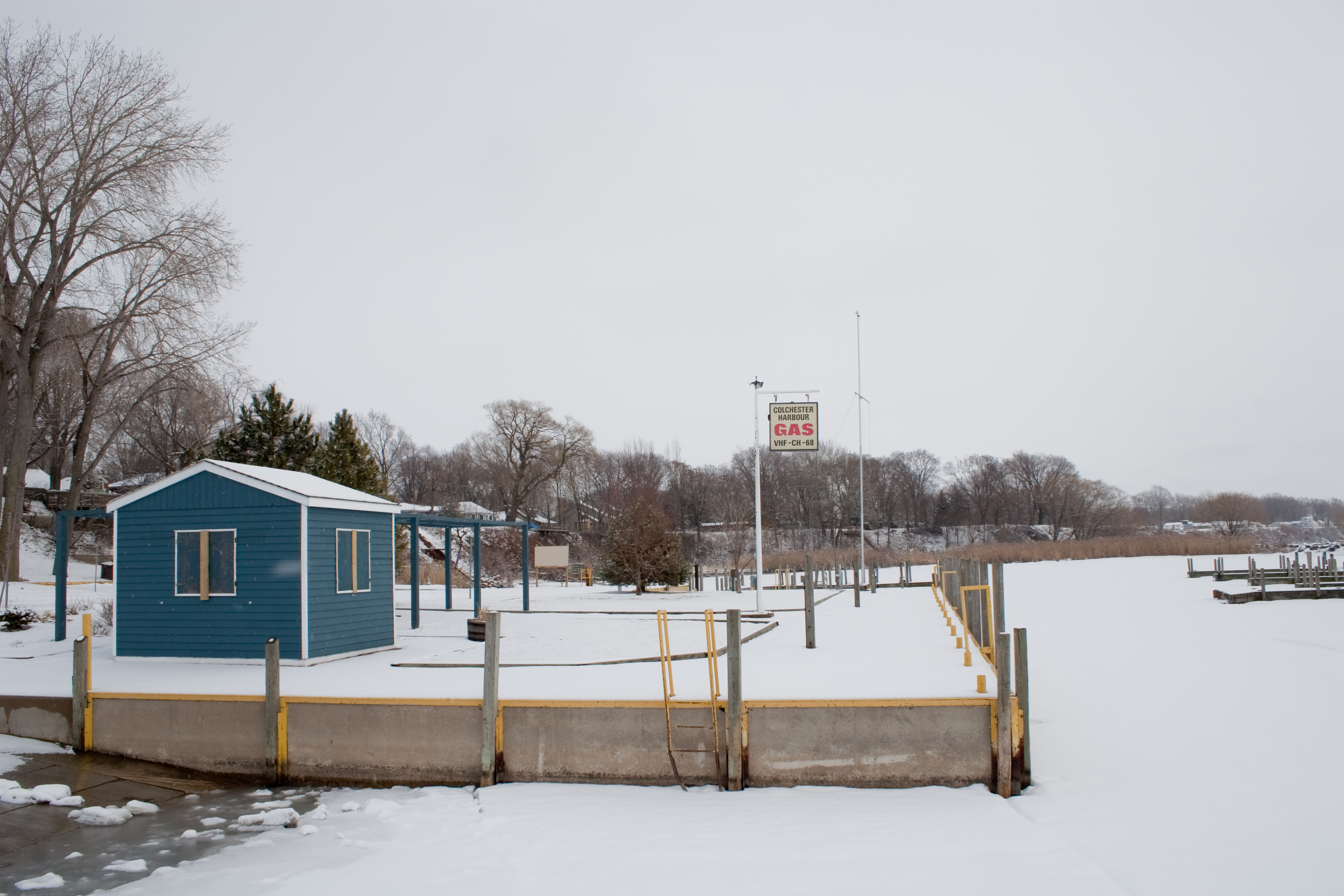
- Gas bar at Colchester harbour in winter

- Location in southern Ontario
- Coordinates: 41°59′11″N 82°56′05″W
- Country: Canada
- Province: Ontario
- County: Essex
- Town: Essex
- Elevation: 176 m (577 ft)
- Time zone: UTC-5 (Eastern Time Zone)
  - Summer (DST): UTC-4 (Eastern Time Zone)
- Postal code: N0R 1G0
- Area codes: 519, 226

Colchester is a community and unincorporated place in Southwestern Ontario, the southernmost settlement on mainland Canada, and the southernmost point with the exception of Point Pelee National Park. It is located on the north shore of Lake Erie, approximately 6 kilometres (3.7 mi) south of the town of Harrow. Colchester was formerly part of the Township of Colchester South and is now a part of the amalgamated Town of Essex within the County of Essex. Colchester shares its postal code with Harrow as N0R 1G0.

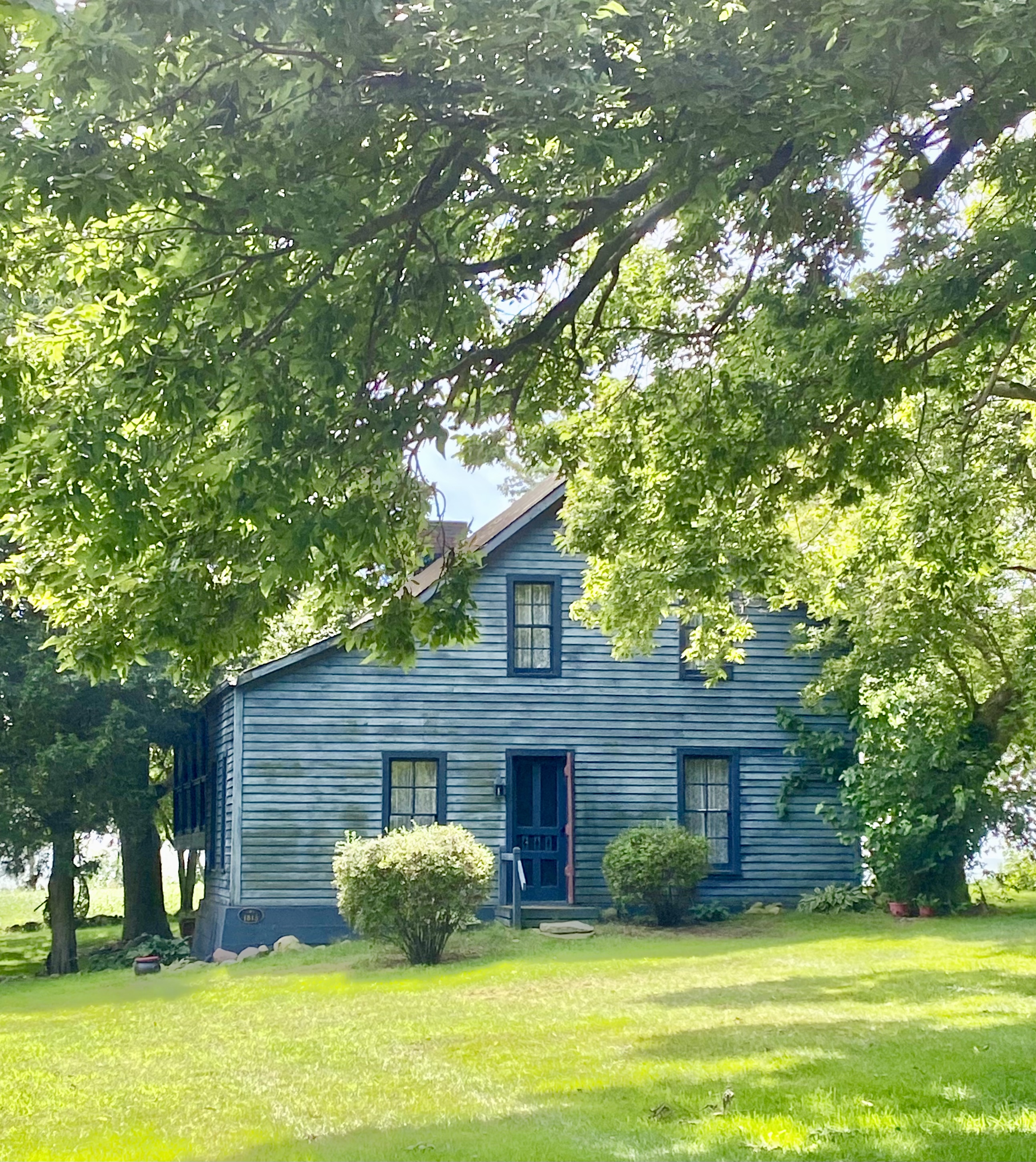
Historic Snider House, built in 1813.

Europeans began to settle in Colchester in the 18th century. Many United Empire Loyalists (or Pennsylvanian Dutch Pacifists) leaving the United States around the time of the American Revolutionary War were given land grants in Colchester. One such Loyalist was John Snider of Pennsylvania. In 1798 Snider was given Lot 82 along the lakefront and built a home for his family just west of the village. As the oldest known structure along Lake Erie's shoreline, the house was completed in 1813 and a letter from the time indicates that men were working on the home's roof as cannons roared during the Battle of Lake Erie. A few of these loyalist families (Tofflemire, Kratz, Monger) were captured at Ruddell's Station in Kentucky during the British/Indian raids under the command of Captain Henry Byrd in 1780 and taken by force north (~600 mi) to Detroit. After being freed when the Treaty of Paris was signed in 1783, most of the surviving families went to Grosse Ile and eventually to Essex County. Most of these lands have been passed from one generation with some families passing them to up to their 8th generation.

The area was also a destination for slaves escaping the United States via the Underground Railroad in the mid-19th century, and for freed slaves during and after the American Civil War. In the 1870s a church was built along Dunn Road by many pioneering blacks, and it was named Zion African Methodist Episcopal (AME) Church. The church's cemetery still stands today on the western edge of the Road. Colchester was also the birthplace and hometown of railroad engineer and inventor Elijah McCoy, whose work was granted 45 patents in the US.

Today, in addition to its many lakeside cottages, Colchester is home to several hundred year-round residents who have converted older homes and built new ones. Restaurants, a public beach, and a marina have been an important part of Colchester for some years now. The population is approximately 900.

Colchester lies along the southernmost road on mainland Canada, County Road 50, and has recently become a tourist destination because of the nearby wineries, the beach and harbour, and the scenery of the area. The village is also home to Christ Church Colchester (Anglican) which has a long history dating back to the beginnings of Colchester as a settlement.
