= Essex, Ontario =

Town in Ontario, Canada

Essex
- Town (lower-tier)
- Town of Essex
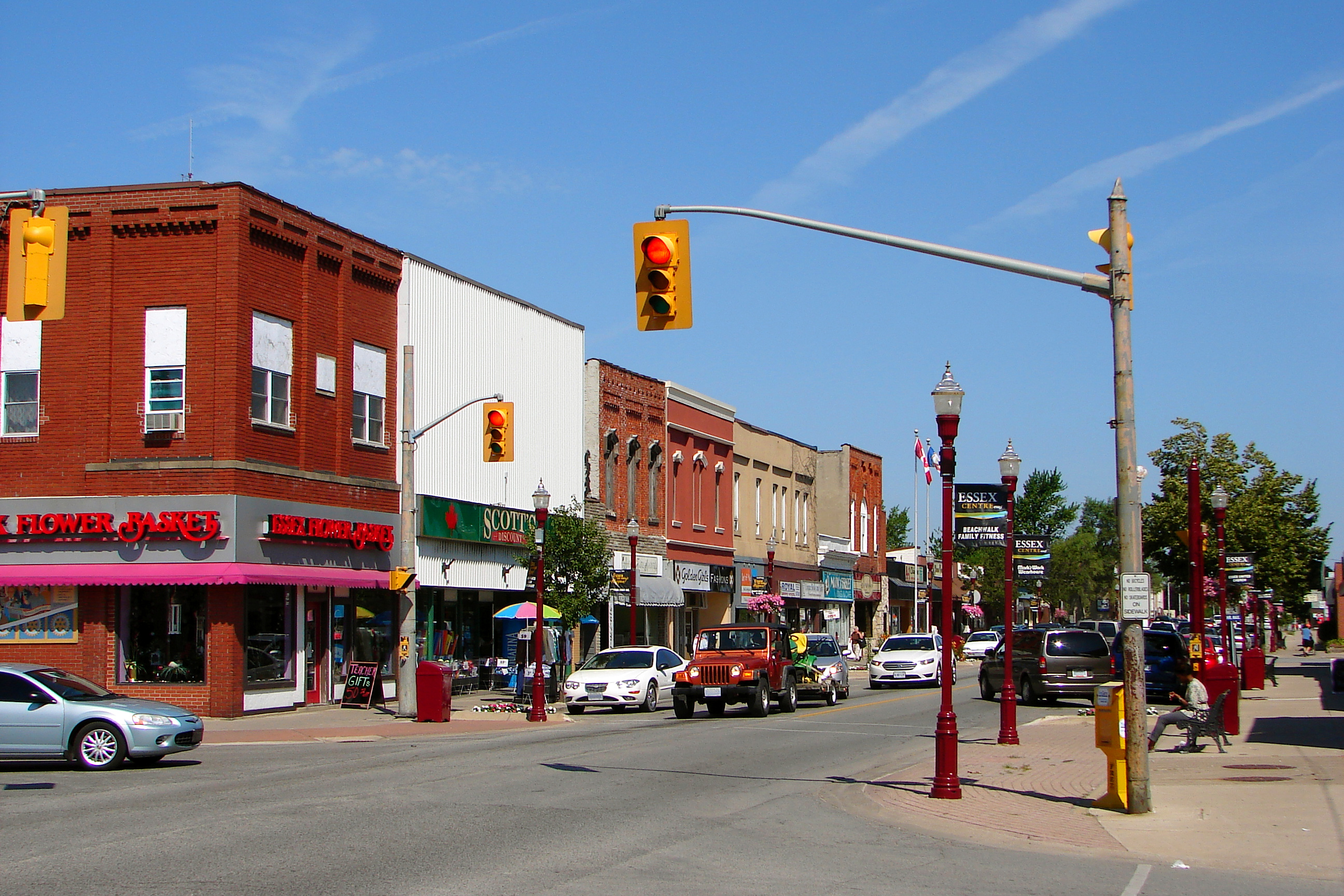

- Flag

- Location within Essex County Location within Southern Ontario
- Coordinates: 42°05′39″N 82°54′03″W
- Country: Canada
- Province: Ontario
- County: Essex
- Formed: January 1, 1999

Government
  - Mayor: Sherry Bondy
  - Member of Parliament: Chris Lewis (CPC)
  - Provincial Representative: Anthony Leardi (PC)

Area
  - Land: 277.53 km^{2} (107.15 sq mi)

Population (2021)
  - Total: 21,216
  - Density: 76.4/km^{2} (198/sq mi)
- Time zone: UTC-5 (Eastern (EST))
  - Summer (DST): UTC-4 (EDT)
- Forward sortation area: N8M
- Area codes: 519 and 226
- Website: www.essex.ca

Essex is a town with a population of 21,216 in Essex County in southwestern Ontario, Canada, whose municipal borders extend to Lake Erie. Essex is also the name of the largest community within the municipality.

== History ==
The current Town of Essex was created on 1 April 1999 through the amalgamation of the former towns of Essex and Harrow, along with the former townships of Colchester North and Colchester South. Each community has a distinct history prior to amalgamation. Colchester South is notable for lying farther south than the northern border of California.

=== Essex ===
The Talbot Trail has enabled Essex to increase in population in the last half of the 19th century, and achieve town status in 1890.

On August 10, 1907, 5,000 pounds (2,300 kg) of nitro-glycerine on a train cart exploded at the train station in Essex. Shock waves were felt in parts of Michigan, and debris was sent 600 yards (550 m). Two people were killed, and there was over 250,000 dollars' worth of property damage.

== Geography ==
The town comprises the communities of Ambassador Beach, Barretville, Belcreft Beach, Colchester, Edgars, Essex Centre, Gesto, Harrow, Klie's Beach, Leslies Corner, Levergood Beach, Lypps Beach, Marshfield, McGregor, New Canaan, Oxley, Paquette Corners, Seymour Beach and Vereker.

=== Climate ===
Climate data for Harrow CDA (1991−2020 normals, extremes 1917–present)
Month	Jan	Feb	Mar	Apr	May	Jun	Jul	Aug	Sep	Oct	Nov	Dec	Year
Record high °C (°F)	17.2 (63.0)	19.4 (66.9)	26.1 (79.0)	30.0 (86.0)	34.0 (93.2)	38.0 (100.4)	40.6 (105.1)	40.0 (104.0)	36.7 (98.1)	32.2 (90.0)	25.6 (78.1)	17.2 (63.0)	40.6 (105.1)
Mean daily maximum °C (°F)	−0.4 (31.3)	1.2 (34.2)	6.4 (43.5)	13.4 (56.1)	20.0 (68.0)	25.4 (77.7)	27.6 (81.7)	26.5 (79.7)	22.9 (73.2)	15.8 (60.4)	8.5 (47.3)	2.4 (36.3)	14.1 (57.4)
Daily mean °C (°F)	−3.7 (25.3)	−2.5 (27.5)	2.2 (36.0)	8.3 (46.9)	14.8 (58.6)	20.4 (68.7)	22.6 (72.7)	21.6 (70.9)	17.9 (64.2)	11.4 (52.5)	5.0 (41.0)	−0.6 (30.9)	9.8 (49.6)
Mean daily minimum °C (°F)	−7 (19)	−6 (21)	−2.1 (28.2)	3.2 (37.8)	9.7 (49.5)	15.4 (59.7)	17.6 (63.7)	16.7 (62.1)	12.9 (55.2)	6.9 (44.4)	1.4 (34.5)	−3.5 (25.7)	5.4 (41.7)
Record low °C (°F)	−28 (−18)	−28.9 (−20.0)	−20.6 (−5.1)	−12.5 (9.5)	−3.9 (25.0)	1.7 (35.1)	5.6 (42.1)	3.9 (39.0)	−2.2 (28.0)	−6.1 (21.0)	−15.6 (3.9)	−27 (−17)	−28.9 (−20.0)
Average precipitation mm (inches)	39.0 (1.54)	56.3 (2.22)	64.3 (2.53)	79.1 (3.11)	89.2 (3.51)	86.3 (3.40)	96.1 (3.78)	101.6 (4.00)	103.4 (4.07)	85.9 (3.38)	94.9 (3.74)	80.5 (3.17)	976.7 (38.45)
Average rainfall mm (inches)	16.4 (0.65)	29.0 (1.14)	49.7 (1.96)	75.3 (2.96)	89.2 (3.51)	86.3 (3.40)	96.1 (3.78)	101.6 (4.00)	103.4 (4.07)	85.1 (3.35)	89.3 (3.52)	59.8 (2.35)	881.1 (34.69)
Average snowfall cm (inches)	22.7 (8.9)	27.4 (10.8)	14.7 (5.8)	3.8 (1.5)	0.0 (0.0)	0.0 (0.0)	0.0 (0.0)	0.0 (0.0)	0.0 (0.0)	0.78 (0.31)	5.6 (2.2)	20.7 (8.1)	95.6 (37.6)
Average precipitation days (≥ 0.2 mm)	10.6	9.7	11.8	13.3	12.7	10.3	8.8	9.3	10.8	11.8	12.8	13.6	135.5
Average rainy days (≥ 0.2 mm)	3.5	4.1	8.7	12.4	12.7	10.3	8.8	9.3	10.8	11.8	12.1	8.5	113.0
Average snowy days (≥ 0.2 cm)	7.4	6.2	3.6	1.0	0.0	0.0	0.0	0.0	0.0	0.09	1.4	6.6	26.3
Average relative humidity (%) (at 15:00 LST)	73.3	69.7	64.8	55.9	58.2	55.5	56.3	59.5	59.4	60.0	66.3	74.2	62.8
Mean monthly sunshine hours	83.8	107.3	136.8	174.1	235.2	269.9	270.6	241.4	187.3	149.8	86.1	59.6	2,001.7
Percentage possible sunshine	28.5	36.1	37.0	43.5	52.2	59.3	58.6	56.2	49.9	43.5	29.1	20.9	42.9
Source: Environment and Climate Change Canada (precipitation/rain/snow/sunshine 1981–2010)

== Demographics ==
Census	Population
1901	1,391
1911	1,353
1921	1,588
1931	1,954
1941	1,935
1951	2,741
1961	3,428
1971	4,002
1981	6,295
1991	6,759
2001	20,085
2006	20,032
2011	19,600
2016	20,427
2021	21,216

In the 2021 Census of Population conducted by Statistics Canada, Essex had a population of 21,216 living in 8,391 of its 8,880 total private dwellings, a change of 3.9% from its 2016 population of 20,427. With a land area of 277.53 km^{2} (107.15 sq mi), it had a population density of 76.4/km^{2} (198.0/sq mi) in 2021.

== Arts and culture ==
Community fairs include the Essex Fun Fest, and the Harrow Fair, the oldest community fair in Ontario.

Essex was once known region-wide for its large crow population, and the nightly infestation was acute in the late 1980s and early 1990s. The consistent use of "boomers" and other techniques that discourage roosting at sundown eventually led the crows to disperse, and the population has declined.

== Sports ==
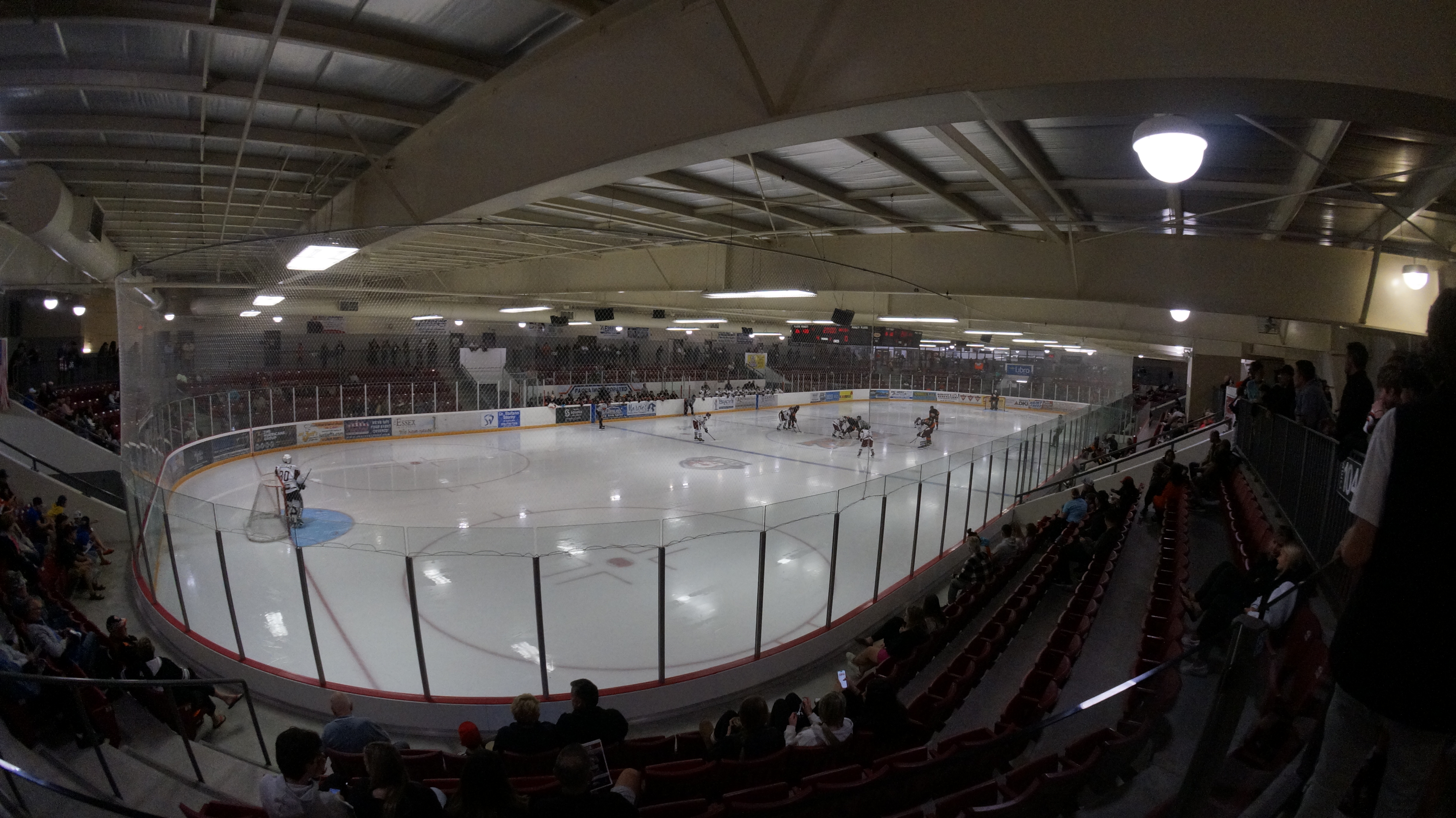
Essex 73's home game

The Essex 73's are a Junior C hockey team that have won 20 Great Lakes Hockey League titles and seven provincial titles.

== Government ==
Essex is divided into four wards which correspond to the four major communities involved in the 1999 amalgamation. During municipal elections, residents vote for a mayor, deputy mayor, and councillor(s) in their geographical ward.

- Ward 1 - Essex Centre (2 councillors)
- Ward 2 - Colchester North (1 councillor)
- Ward 3 - Colchester South (2 councillors)
- Ward 4 - Harrow Centre (1 councillor)

Town council as of March 2022:

- Mayor - Richard Meloche
- Deputy Mayor - Steve Bjorkman
- Ward 1 Councillor - Morley Bowman
- Ward 1 Councillor - Joe Garon
- Ward 2 Councillor - Kim Verbeek
- Ward 3 Councillor - Chris Vander Doelen
- Ward 3 Councillor - Jason Matyi
- Ward 4 Councillor - Sherry Bondy

== Education ==
English-language public education for kindergarten through secondary school grades in Essex County is administered by the Greater Essex County District School Board, along with the Windsor-Essex Catholic District School Board which oversees English-language catholic education.

French-language public and catholic education are overseen by the Conseil scolaire Viamonde and the Conseil scolaire de district des écoles catholiques du Sud-Ouest respectively. The scope of all of these organizations includes both the County and the City of Windsor.

Prior to 1998 the Essex County Board of Education operated Anglophone secular public schools.

One public secondary school of the Greater Essex County District School Board is situated in Essex. Essex District High School serves Essex Centre, Colchester North and areas of Tecumseh, Lakeshore, and Kingsville. Kingsville District High School serves Harrow Centre and Colchester South, following the closure of Harrow District High School in 2016. Public school students from certain areas of Essex may attend General Amherst High School in Amherstburg. While there is no separate secondary school within the boundaries of Essex, students in the town may attend the Windsor-Essex Catholic District School Board's St. Thomas of Villanova Catholic High School in LaSalle or Cardinal Carter Catholic High School in Leamington.

Elementary schools of the Greater Essex County District School Board include Essex Public School, Colchester North Public School, and Harrow Public School. Separate elementary schools of the Windsor-Essex Catholic District School Board include Holy Name Catholic Elementary School and St. Anthony Catholic Elementary School.

== Notable people ==
- Scott Burnside
- Bruce Crowder
- Frederick Alexander Cuthbert
- Gordon Bennett Ellis
- Colton Fretter
- John Bell Gourlay
- Gary Gurbin
- Lee Harris
- Rick Heinz
- Zach Lavin
- Dan O'Halloran
- Alexander Parent
- Jo Primeau known as Juice Boxx
- Matt Puempel
- Jeff Watson

== See also ==
- List of municipalities in Ontario
- List of townships in Ontario
