= Kingsville, Ontario =

Town in Ontario, Canada

Kingsville
- Town (lower-tier)
- Town of Kingsville
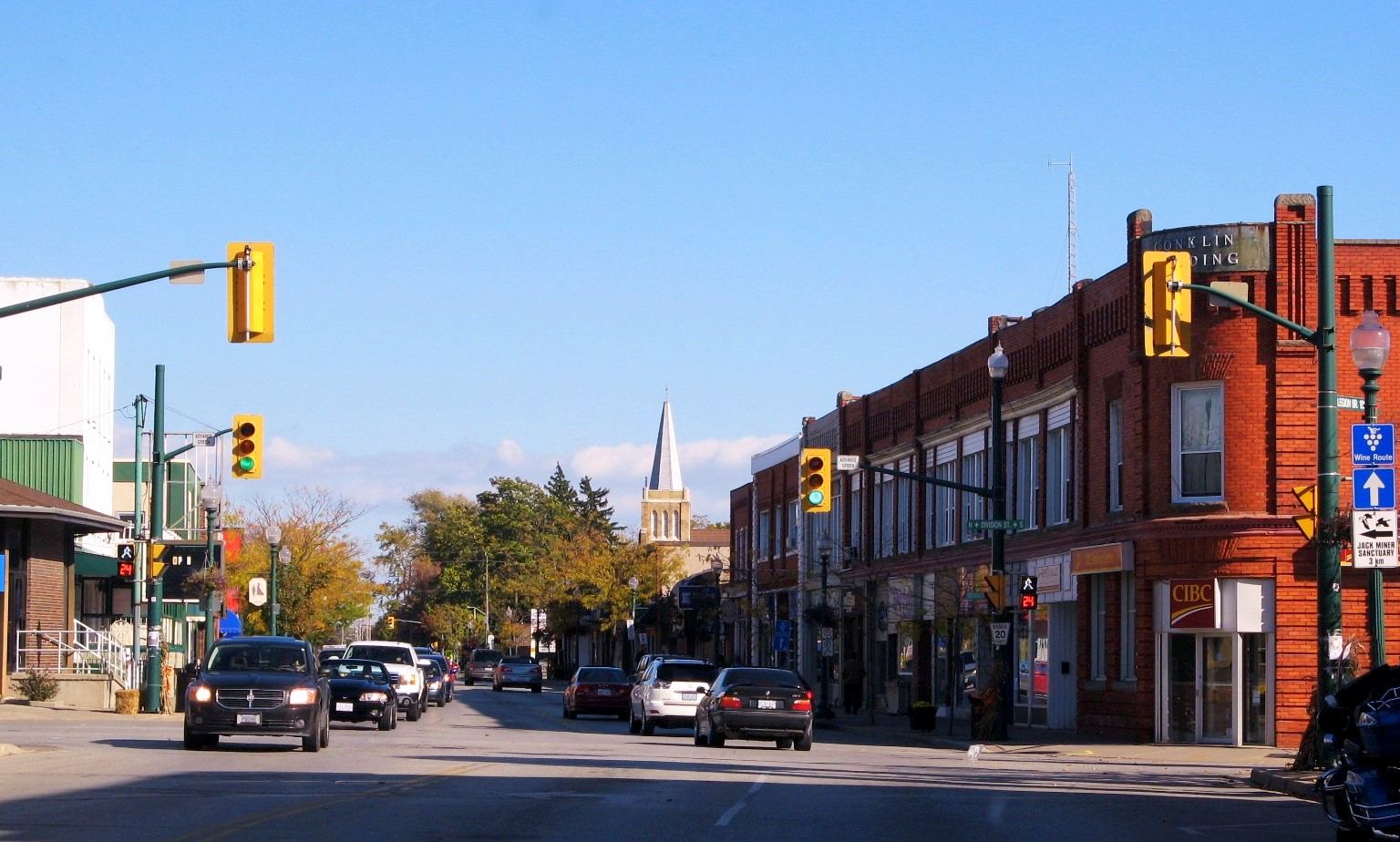
- Main Street

- Flag Coat of arms
- Nickname: Canada's Southernmost Town
- Location within Essex County Location within Southern Ontario
- Coordinates: 42°6′N 82°43′W
- Country: Canada
- Province: Ontario
- County: Essex
- Incorporated: 1901

Government
  - Mayor: Dennis Rogers
  - MP: Chris Lewis (CPC)
  - MPP: Anthony Leardi (PC)

Area
  - Land: 246.83 km^{2} (95.30 sq mi)
- Elevation: 200.00 m (656.17 ft)

Population (2016)
  - Total: 21,552
  - Density: 87.3/km^{2} (226/sq mi)
- Time zone: UTC-5 (Eastern (EST))
  - Summer (DST): UTC-4 (EDT)
- Forward sortation area: N9Y
- Area codes: 519 and 226
- Website: www.kingsville.ca

Kingsville is a town in Essex County, Ontario, Canada. It is best known for being "Canada's Southernmost Town". The town had a population of 22,119 in the Canada 2021 Census, a 2.6% increase from the previous census figure of 21,552 in 2016.

== History ==
Kingsville was incorporated as a town in 1901. It was named for Colonel James King, an early settler who was instrumental in the establishment of the community.

On January 1, 1999, it was amalgamated with the adjoining townships of Gosfield North and Gosfield South to form an expanded municipality.

== Geography ==
Kingsville—the country's southernmost town—lies on the north shore of Lake Erie. The town of Lakeshore is to the north, the municipality of Leamington is to the east, and the town of Harrow is to the west.

The town is approximately 570 feet above sea level. Long stretches of the coastline are elevated above Lake Erie. However, the terrain is generally flat, and consists of glacial drift—a mixture of various rocks, sand and clay.

=== Communities ===
In addition to the primary settlement at Kingsville, the municipality also includes the smaller communities of Cedar Beach, Cedar Island, Cedarhurst Park, Cottam, Klondyke, Linden Beach, North Ridge, Olinda, Ruthven and Union. The community of Albuna is located on the boundary between Kingsville and Leamington, and the communities of Arner and Elford are located on the boundary between Kingsville and Essex.

=== Climate ===
Climate data for Kingsville (1991−2020 normals, extremes 1968–present)
Month	Jan	Feb	Mar	Apr	May	Jun	Jul	Aug	Sep	Oct	Nov	Dec	Year
Record high °C (°F)	15.0 (59.0)	17.0 (62.6)	25.0 (77.0)	27.0 (80.6)	31.0 (87.8)	37.5 (99.5)	36.5 (97.7)	36.0 (96.8)	35.0 (95.0)	29.0 (84.2)	22.0 (71.6)	18.0 (64.4)	37.5 (99.5)
Mean daily maximum °C (°F)	−0.4 (31.3)	0.6 (33.1)	5.7 (42.3)	12.4 (54.3)	19.3 (66.7)	24.6 (76.3)	27.0 (80.6)	26.2 (79.2)	22.5 (72.5)	15.7 (60.3)	8.2 (46.8)	2.8 (37.0)	13.7 (56.7)
Daily mean °C (°F)	−3.3 (26.1)	−2.8 (27.0)	1.8 (35.2)	8.2 (46.8)	14.8 (58.6)	20.4 (68.7)	22.8 (73.0)	22.1 (71.8)	18.4 (65.1)	11.8 (53.2)	5.1 (41.2)	0.1 (32.2)	10.0 (50.0)
Mean daily minimum °C (°F)	−6.8 (19.8)	−5.9 (21.4)	−1.8 (28.8)	3.7 (38.7)	10.3 (50.5)	16.2 (61.2)	18.7 (65.7)	17.9 (64.2)	14.4 (57.9)	8.1 (46.6)	2.0 (35.6)	−2.5 (27.5)	6.2 (43.2)
Record low °C (°F)	−29.0 (−20.2)	−26.0 (−14.8)	−22.0 (−7.6)	−13.0 (8.6)	−2.0 (28.4)	3.9 (39.0)	6.0 (42.8)	6.0 (42.8)	−0.6 (30.9)	−5.0 (23.0)	−11.5 (11.3)	−23.0 (−9.4)	−29.0 (−20.2)
Average precipitation mm (inches)	66.6 (2.62)	51.5 (2.03)	65.1 (2.56)	93.6 (3.69)	86.7 (3.41)	61.5 (2.42)	74.1 (2.92)	82.8 (3.26)	75.7 (2.98)	66.9 (2.63)	61.3 (2.41)	56.0 (2.20)	841.6 (33.13)
Average rainfall mm (inches)	36.6 (1.44)	34.0 (1.34)	45.2 (1.78)	91.6 (3.61)	86.7 (3.41)	61.5 (2.42)	74.1 (2.92)	82.8 (3.26)	75.7 (2.98)	66.9 (2.63)	61.3 (2.41)	56.0 (2.20)	841.6 (33.13)
Average snowfall cm (inches)	30.1 (11.9)	17.4 (6.9)	17.2 (6.8)	1.9 (0.7)	0.0 (0.0)	0.0 (0.0)	0.0 (0.0)	0.0 (0.0)	0.0 (0.0)	0.1 (0.0)	3.0 (1.2)	15.5 (6.1)	85.1 (33.5)
Average precipitation days (≥ 0.2 mm)	10.9	8.9	10.8	12.6	12.1	9.3	9.4	8.8	9.1	9.7	10.4	11.0	122.8
Average rainy days (≥ 0.2 mm)	4.8	4.9	7.5	12.1	12.1	9.3	9.4	8.8	9.1	9.7	9.7	7.6	104.9
Average snowy days (≥ 0.2 cm)	6.7	4.2	3.6	0.68	0.0	0.0	0.0	0.0	0.0	0.12	1.1	4.0	20.5
Source: Environment Canada

== Demographics ==
Historical population
Year	Pop.	±%
1871	800	—
1901	1,537	+92.1%
1911	1,427	−7.2%
1921	1,783	+24.9%
1931	2,174	+21.9%
1941	2,317	+6.6%
1951	2,631	+13.6%
1961	3,041	+15.6%
1971	4,076	+34.0%
1981	5,134	+26.0%
1991	5,716	+11.3%
2001	19,619	+243.2%
2006	20,908	+6.6%
2011	21,362	+2.2%
2016	21,552	+0.9%

In the 2021 Census of Population conducted by Statistics Canada, Kingsville had a population of 22,119 living in 8,285 of its 8,635 total private dwellings, a change of 2.6% from its 2016 population of 21,552. With a land area of 246.08 km^{2} (95.01 sq mi), it had a population density of 89.9/km^{2} (232.8/sq mi) in 2021.

Canada census – Kingsville community profile

	2021	2016	2011
Population	22,119 (+2.6% from 2016)	21,552 (0.9% from 2011)	21,362 (2.2% from 2006)
Land area	246.08 km^{2} (95.01 sq mi)	246.83 km^{2} (95.30 sq mi)	246.84 km^{2} (95.31 sq mi)
Population density	89.9/km^{2} (233/sq mi)	87.3/km^{2} (226/sq mi)	86.5/km^{2} (224/sq mi)
Median age	45.2 (M: 42.8, F: 47.2)		42.0 (M: 40.8, F: 43.4)
Private dwellings	8,635 (total) 8,285 (occupied)	8359 (total)	8170 (total)
Median household income	$94,000

References: 2021 2016 2011

Canada 2006 Census		Population	% of total population
Visible minority group Source:	South Asian	0	0%
Visible minority group Source:	Chinese	30	0.1%
Visible minority group Source:	Black	190	0.9%
Visible minority group Source:	Filipino	20	0.1%
Visible minority group Source:	Latin American	395	1.9%
Visible minority group Source:	Arab	80	0.4%
Visible minority group Source:	Southeast Asian	15	0.1%
Visible minority group Source:	West Asian	0	0%
Visible minority group Source:	Korean	0	0%
Visible minority group Source:	Japanese	0	0%
Visible minority group Source:	Other visible minority	0	0%
Visible minority group Source:	Mixed visible minority	10	0%
Total visible minority population		740	3.6%
Aboriginal group Source:	First Nations	105	0.5%
Aboriginal group Source:	Métis	75	0.4%
Aboriginal group Source:	Inuit	0	0%
Total Aboriginal population		180	0.9%
White		19,580	95.5%
Total population		20,500	100%

== Attractions ==
Kingsville is home to the Jack Miner Bird Sanctuary. Jack Miner was awarded the Order of the British Empire (OBE) for his achievements in conservation in the British Empire. It was awarded June 23, 1943, by King George VI, as King of Canada. Jack Miner is considered "the father of the conservation movement on the continent".

Kingsville is home to Colasanti's Tropical Gardens, which attracts people from all over Ontario. The gardens have many varieties of tropical plants and animals.

Kingsville is also home to the Kingsville Music Festival, organized by the Kingsville Music Society. It began in early August 2014 and has continued each year with headliners such as Bruce Cockburn, Ashley MacIsaac, Steven Page, and Kathleen Edwards.

== Sports ==
Kingsville was, for 26 years, the home town of the Great Lakes Jr. C team Kingsville Comets. The team was sold and moved to Amherstburg in 2013, becoming the Amherstburg Admirals. The town was among the top 5 places in Canada chosen for CBC's Kraft Hockeyville 2008, and finished in 2nd place in the competition with over 1.5 million votes.

In 2015, the Kingsville Kings were formed and added to the South Conference of the Greater Metro Junior A Hockey League. They play out of the Kingsville Arena Complex.

After playing a neutral site game in Kingsville during the 2016–17 season, the St. Clair Shores Fighting Saints of the Federal Hockey League relocated to Kingsville for the 2017–18 season as the North Shore Knights. The team played most of its home games out of the Kingsville Arena Complex with a few other neutral site home games in various cities in Ontario and Quebec. After cancelling several games during the season, the Knights were not listed as an FHL member the following season.

== Education ==
Kingsville has two schools: Erie Migration District School and St. John de Brebeuf Catholic Elementary School.

Erie Migration District School, which opened in September 2024, consolidated the student populations of three of Kingsville's public schools—Jack Miner Public School (which had previously absorbed Ruthven Public School in 2013), Kingsville Public School, and Kingsville District High School. All three predecessor schools closed in June 2024.

== Notable people from Kingsville ==
- Meghan Agosta, Olympic ice hockey player
- Jack Miner, conservationist
- Ellie Moon, playwright and actor
- Dalton Prout, NHL hockey player
- Paul Quantrill, Major League baseball player

== See also ==
- List of townships in Ontario
