= Harrow, Ontario =

Town in Ontario, Canada

Harrow
- Urban area
- Harrow Centre
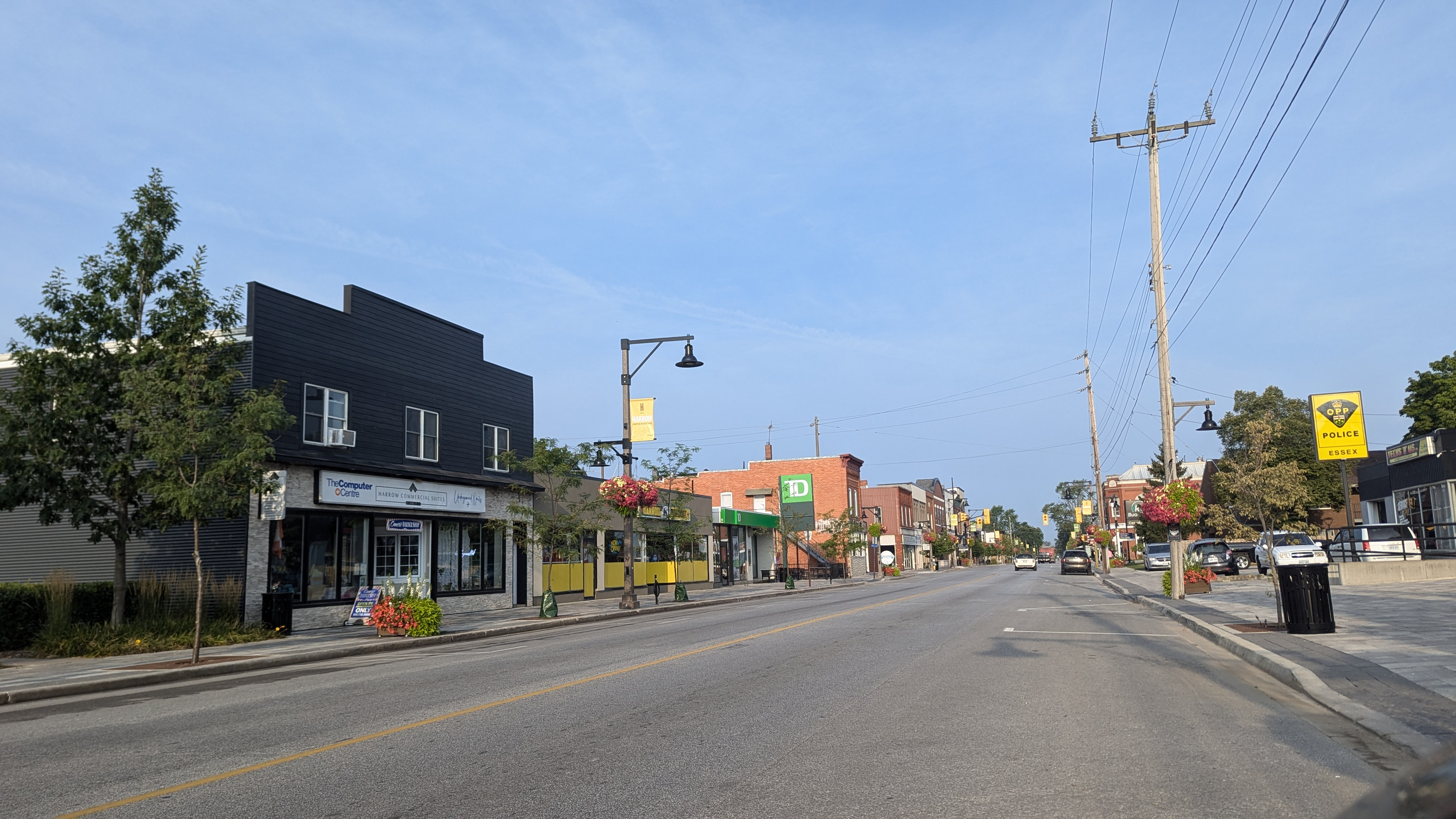

- Location within Harrow Location within Southern Ontario
- Coordinates: 42.0355°N 82.9187°W
- Country: Canada
- Province: Ontario
- County: Essex

Government
  - Councillor: Sherry Bondy

Area
  - Land: 2.86 km^{2} (1.10 sq mi)

Population (2021)
  - Total: 2,562
  - Density: 895.8/km^{2} (2,320/sq mi)
- Time zone: UTC-5 (Eastern (EST))
  - Summer (DST): UTC-4 (EDT)
- Forward sortation area: N0R 1G0
- Area codes: 519 and 226

Harrow is a community located in the Town of Essex in Essex County, Ontario, Canada.

== History ==
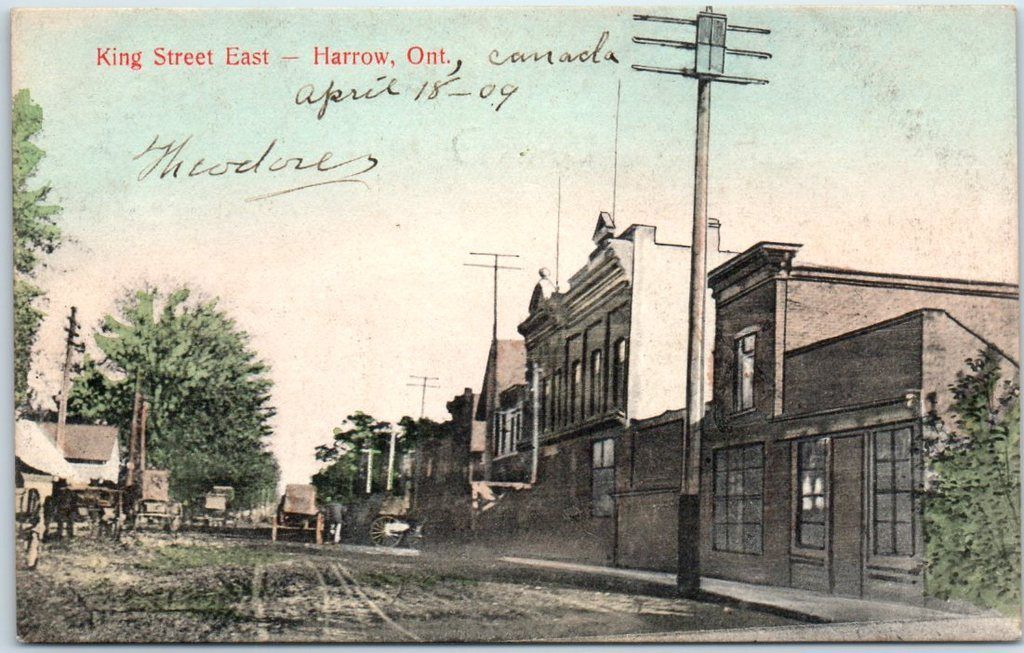
View of King Street East in Harrow, c. 1909

First known as Munger's Corners after John Munger, the first postmaster, the town was renamed by John O'Connor in 1857 for the exclusive Harrow School in London.

Hiram Walker, of Canadian Club Whisky fame, is credited with putting Harrow on the map. Walker built a railway which brought grain from the south end of the county into the city of Windsor for use in his distillery. The tracks remained for over 100 years, and were removed in 1992. The line became the Chrysler Canada Greenway, part of the Trans Canada Trail.

Walker's distillation operations remained in Harrow until 2009, when the Canbar, Inc. cooperage closed.

Harrow was also home to Ontario's last segregated school, which was finally closed in the 1960s.

In 1999, the town of Harrow amalgamated with the town of Essex. The government of Essex was divided into four wards consisting of six elected councillors, plus a mayor. Harrow is the fourth ward and has a single councillor in the government.

The town was home to Harrow District High School, formerly Canada's southernmost high school until it was closed in 2016.

== Today ==
Though early settlers were mostly German, a thriving community of Portuguese came later and still remain. Today Harrow is a community situated along scenic County Road 20 that offers shops and places for antique hunters. Attractions include Colio Winery and the historic John R. Park Homestead.

Harrow has organized and hosted an annual agricultural fair every Labour Day weekend for over 150 years, and many people from Essex County and other parts of Ontario attend. Highlights of the fair include a mom calling contest, a pie auction, live entertainment, "bossy" bingo and a tractor pull. The Agriculture and Agri-Food Canada Harrow Research and Development Centre is also located in Harrow. Atlas Tube, a unit of Zekelman Industries, owned by the Zekelman family, is located on the outskirts of town.

== Demographics ==
The 2001 Census was the last Canadian census to record demographic statistics for Harrow as a separate community. In the 2006 Census, statistics were published only for Essex.

For 2001 census:

| Population: | 2,935 (+4.6% from 1996) |
| Land area: | 2.75 km^{2} |
| Population density: | 1,067.3 people/km^{2} |
| Median age: | 35.6 (males: 34.2, females: 37.1) |
| Total private dwellings: | 1,075 |
| Mean household income: | $29,932 |
