= Chrysler Canada Greenway =

Recreational trail in Ontario, Canada

Coordinates: 42.247835°N 82.950897°W

Chrysler Canada Greenway
- Length: 42 km (26 mi)
- Trailheads: Highway 3 (Northern Terminus, but continues 2 km to N. Talbot Road); Colasanti's Tropical Gardens

The Chrysler Canada Greenway is a 42-kilometre-long (26 mi) rail trail in Essex County, Ontario, Canada, between Oldcastle (near Windsor) and Leamington.

== History ==
The trail follows the route of a former railway branch line from Windsor, Ontario, south and east through Kingsville to Leamington, Ontario. The rail line was built by Hiram Walker to connect his distillery in Windsor to Kingsville in 1882 and was extended to Leamington in 1889. The rail line operated as the Canadian branch of the Chesapeake and Ohio Railway and by the late 1980s was operated by CSX Transportation.

A portion of the rail line from Windsor to Blenheim was abandoned in 1989, and the rail line was donated to the Essex Region Conservation Authority (ERCA) in 1993. In exchange for naming rights, Chrysler Canada provided a $250,000 donation to convert the rail line to a bike trail. Work was finished on the trail by 1997, and it opened that year to use. The remainder of the rail line would also be abandoned, and its tracks removed to where they branch from the mainline between Highgate and Muirkirk.

The 1998 ECRA budget included $406,000 to develop the Chrysler Canada Greenway, part of which came from the sale of ravine land. The Harrow Rotary Club provided $40,000 in development costs. The first 2 kilometres (1.2 mi) of the Greenway, between Queen Street in Harrow east to Ferriss Side Road, were opened on 29 May 1998. Along with the rail lines, the ECRA also acquired an 1889 stone train station but did not have the funds to preserve it. Development plans to complete the trail were estimated at $750,000 in late 1998, with a federal grant of $145,000.

By 2001, CN Rail took note of the popularity of the trail and donated an additional 26-km spur line from Amherstburg, Ontario to Essex, Ontario, a portion of the rail line operated by the Canada Southern Railway, which was abolished in 1977. (The rails for this spur, were removed in 1995 and the spur leading from Comber to Leamington removed in 2001, eliminating three at-grade railroad crossings on Highway 3). ERCA has stated they intend on converting the new trail from Amhurstburg to Essex as soon as funds become available. There has been no announcements regarding a possible conversion of the Leamington-Comber rail corridor. ERCA, Ontario Parks and Parks Canada have stated interest on turning the entire abandoned rail corridor from Ruthven to St. Thomas into an extended Chrysler Canada Greenway, linking up with trails in Delhi and Simcoe, providing a single long trail corridor from Windsor to London and Kitchener, and possibly to Hamilton then linking to Toronto via the Waterfront Trail. It is currently unknown if Leamington intends on converting its abandoned rail corridors to trails.

LaSalle, Ontario, has also expressed its interest and intentions to link the Windsor Trail and its own LaSalle Trail network to the Greenway.

== How to travel ==
The Greenway allows several different modes of transportation: cycling, walking, horseback riding and cross-country skiing.

== Alignment ==
The trail starts at the junction with Kings Highway 3, with signs to cross at the nearby Walker Road due to the dangerously high levels of traffic. The trail also has an unofficial "extension" which continues 2 km straight to its terminus with North Talbot Road. The Greenway also has five "Community Entrances", three of which (Harrow, Kingsville, and Ruthven) are of "service center" standards.

The Greenway surface is crushed gravel. The route passes through towns and farmland, crossing creeks and connecting 25 woodlots.

Note: Not all exits are initially listed. more will be added as information is received.

Municipality	Road/Intersection	kilometre post	Destinations	Notes
Windsor, Ontario	North Talbot Road	2 km	Ciociaro Club, AKO Camp	Windsor
Tecumseh	Kings Highway 3	0 km	Oldcastle	Official Starting Point. Cross at Walker Road, 0.5 km west. Path continues for 2.0 km to North Talbot Road. Community Entrance.
Tecumseh	South Talbot Road	2 km	Essex	
Essex	Townline Road (Essex County Road 8)	4.9 km	River Canard, Essex	
Essex	14th Concession Road	6 km		
Essex	13th Concession Road	7 km		
Essex	12th Concession Road	8 km		
Essex	11th Concession Road	9 km	McGregor	
Essex	North Malden Road	9.5 km		
Essex	Essex County Road 12	12 km		
Essex	South Malden Road	13.5 km		
Essex	Essex County Road 18	15 km		
Essex	Walker Road (Essex County Road 11)	18.5 km		
Harrow, Ontario	Ferris Road	23 km		
Harrow, Ontario	McCormick Road	26 km		
Kingsville	Arner Townline (Essex County Road 23)	29 km		Schwabb Farms Community entrance
Kingsville	McCain Sideroad	32 km	Pleasant Valley Campground	1.5-km bypass around Kingsville Golf and Country Club. Somewhat narrower than the rest of the Greenway.
Kingsville	Kingsville Golf and Country Club Entrance	34 km	Kingsville Golf and Country Club	
Kingsville	Kingsville Train Station and Museum	36 km	Kingsville, Pelee Island (via ferry)	Kingsville Train Station, a former train station and museum, has been leased to a restaurant operator since 2008 and provides a rest stop along the Greenway in the town of Kingsville. Situated in downtown Kingsville.
Ruthven	Graham Sideroad	40 km	Intersection with Ruthven Spur of trail	Ruthven, Ontario, Colasanti's Tropical Gardens. Trail splits into two paths: Ruthven-bound, and Colasanti-bound. Both are less than 2 km in length.
Ruthven	Colasanti's Tropical Gardens	42 km		End of trail
Ruthven	Talbot Road (Essex County Road 34)	42 km	Talbot Road (Essex County Road 34), Leamington	End of trail

== Extensions ==
Extensions of the trail are planned.

The Municipality of Leamington has expressed interest in converting their abandoned rail lines east of Talbot Road (CR 34) into an extension of the Greenway. Currently, bikes and farm tractors have to use dedicated bike lanes along the very busy Talbot Road, and this is dangerous, due to the high speed limit, trucks, hills, and curves. Currently, the parts east of CR 34 are navigable by bike or foot, but it is not recommended, as the brush is quite thick and it may still be private property.

The nearly all of the right-of-way along the former CN Rail CASO Subdivision from Leamington to a point just east of Ridgetown (via Wheatley, Merlin, and Blenheim) is intact, and able to be converted into a rail trail, and is either in the process of becoming one, or is in the planning stages.

ERCA has expressed its intentions on linking Amherstburg, McGregor, and Essex to the trail network via a 28-km long trail, with an intersection somewhere near McGregor, Ontario. This is already easily done, as ERCA owns the right of way, and a 1-km spur route leads into McGregor from the Greenway.

Aside from money, the insane traffic amounts on Highway 3 (which was scheduled to be twinned starting 2007) would pose a significant obstacle, unless the trail was routed along either an overpass/underpass, or through an intersection/Interchange, such as with Townline Road (County Road 8).

The City of Windsor has also expressed its intentions on linking its bike trail network to the Chrysler Canada Greenway. The most-likely candidate for this would be the Devonwood Bike Trail, which is the farthest-south reaching trail (the closest, with just 3.5 km separating the two), and already connects to an ERCA conservation area (Devonwood Conservation Area).

== See also ==
- Grand Marais Trail
- Ganatchio Trail
- Little River Extension
- Russell Street Neighbourhood Trail
- Devonwood Bike Trail
- Riverside Drive Vista Project
- Bike Trails in the City of Windsor
- Trans-Canada Trail
- Essex Region Conservation Authority
- Michigan Central Railway
- List of trails in Canada
