= Neighbourhoods of Windsor, Ontario =

Overview of neighbourhoods in Windsor, Ontario, Canada

Windsor, Ontario, has a very diverse population, and this diversity is shown in its many neighbourhoods. Windsor has twenty in all, ranging from rural farmland to densely built-up areas.

== Downtown ==
Downtown's boundaries are typically Glengarry Avenue in the east, Janette Avenue in the west, Giles Boulevard in the south, and the Detroit River in the north. This is where much of Windsor's downtown businesses reside.

=== Heart of Windsor ===
The Heart of Windsor is the official name of Windsor's downtown core. It encompasses several city blocks bordered by the Detroit River to the North, Giles Boulevard to the south, the CPR/CN yards to the west and the Casino and the Detroit-Windsor Tunnel to the east.

=== Little Italy ===
Little Italy, or "Via Italia", is home to many Italian families and businesses. It is known for its restaurants and clothing boutiques. It is situated along Erie Street, from Moy Avenue in the east to Goyeau Street to the west.

=== Uptown Ottawa Street ===
Uptown Ottawa Street is another area along a main street. It was first settled in the 1910s and 1920s as a part of Walkerville, Ontario (now the neighbourhood of Walkerville), but has grown into its own distinctive neighbourhood. Ottawa Street has several specialty shops, and has traffic calming measures to keep traffic to 40–50 km/h (25–30 mph). Some of its residents are of Ukrainian, Russian, Polish, and Eastern European descent, however the majority are French and Irish residents as well. The neighbourhood's boundaries are Giles Boulevard/Ontario Street to the north, Walker Road to the east, Howard Avenue to the west, and the Essex Terminal Railway line to the south.

=== South Walkerville ===
South Walkerville is one of Windsor's oldest residential developments. Centralized by Windsor Metropolitan Hospital on Tecumseh Road East, it is bordered by Walker Road to the east, Tecumseh Road East to the North, Howard Avenue to the West and the CPR line to the South. Many of its streets are named after World War I battles such as Ypres, Somme, and Amiens.

=== Walkerville ===
Historical population
Year	Pop.	±%
1901	1,595	—
1911	3,302	+107.0%
1921	7,059	+113.8%
1931	10,105	+43.2%

Walkerville is a historic area of Windsor. It began as a model community for the workers of the Hiram Walker distillery, home of Canadian Club Whisky. It is home to Willistead Manor, designed by renowned architect Albert Kahn and built in 1906. Around Willistead Manor is Willistead Park. This park hosts the annual "Art in the Park" event that draws in residents from all over the county as well as metro Detroit. It is also home to some of the grandest and beautiful homes in Windsor, many of them having received historical distinction from the government of Canada. It is also home to the Devonshire Lodge (also known as the Low-Martin House). Walkerville Collegiate Institute is the local secondary school and boasts the area's only fine arts program for public school students. It has a rich history of serving Canada in both world wars and for putting on exceptional musicals and plays. The Town of Walkerville was founded by Hiram Walker in 1858 and was one of the five border cities until it was amalgamated with Windsor (despite a no-vote by the populace) in 1935.

=== Central Windsor ===
The Central neighbourhood incorporates most of the eastern end of Windsor. It stretches from Chandler Road in the east, stretching along Seminole Street, to George Avenue. It then runs along the Via Rail/CN line as its northern boundary to Lauzon Road in the east, with Tecumseh Road East along its southern boundary.

=== Downtown gallery ===
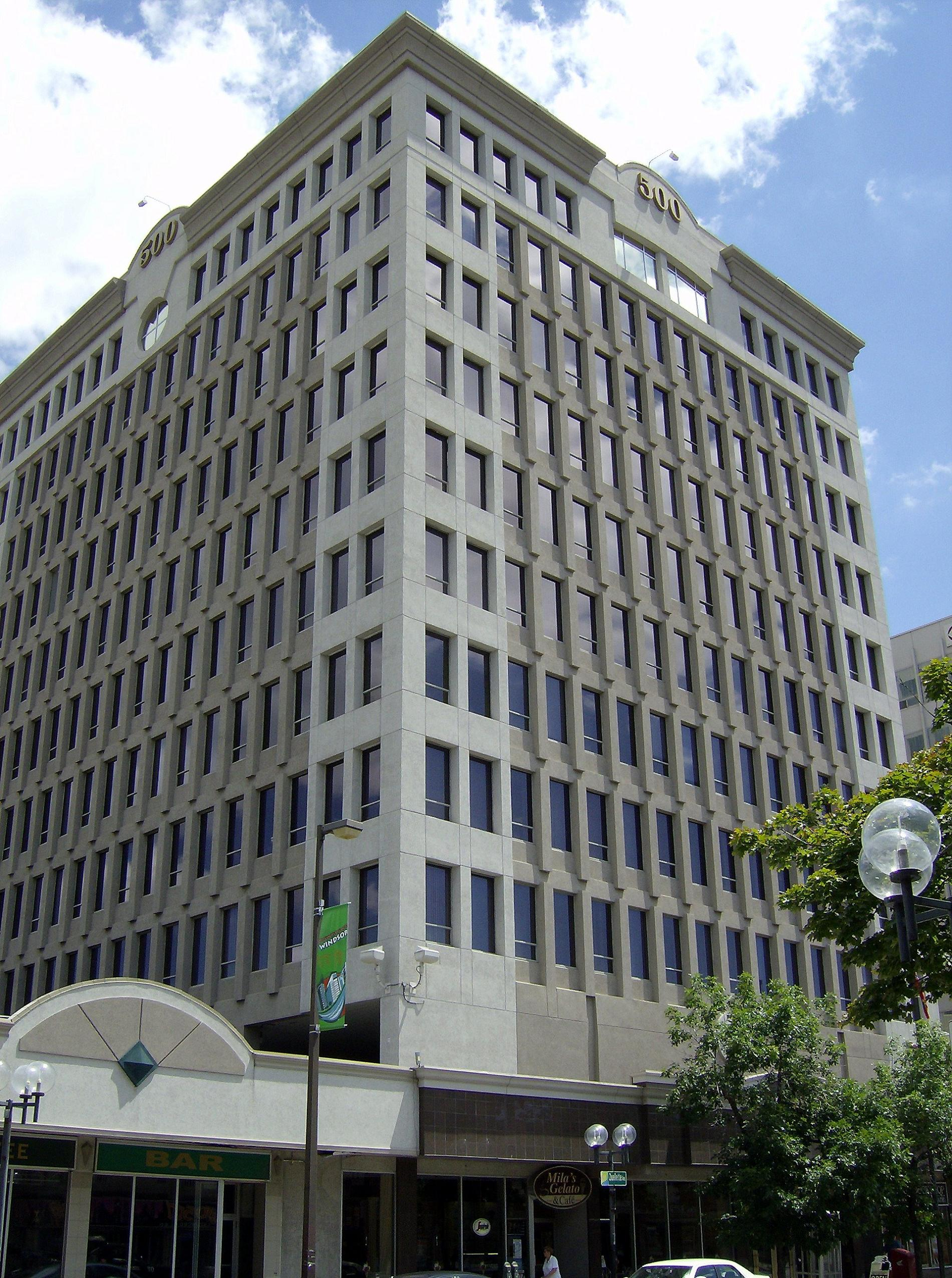
Offices on Ouellette Avenue

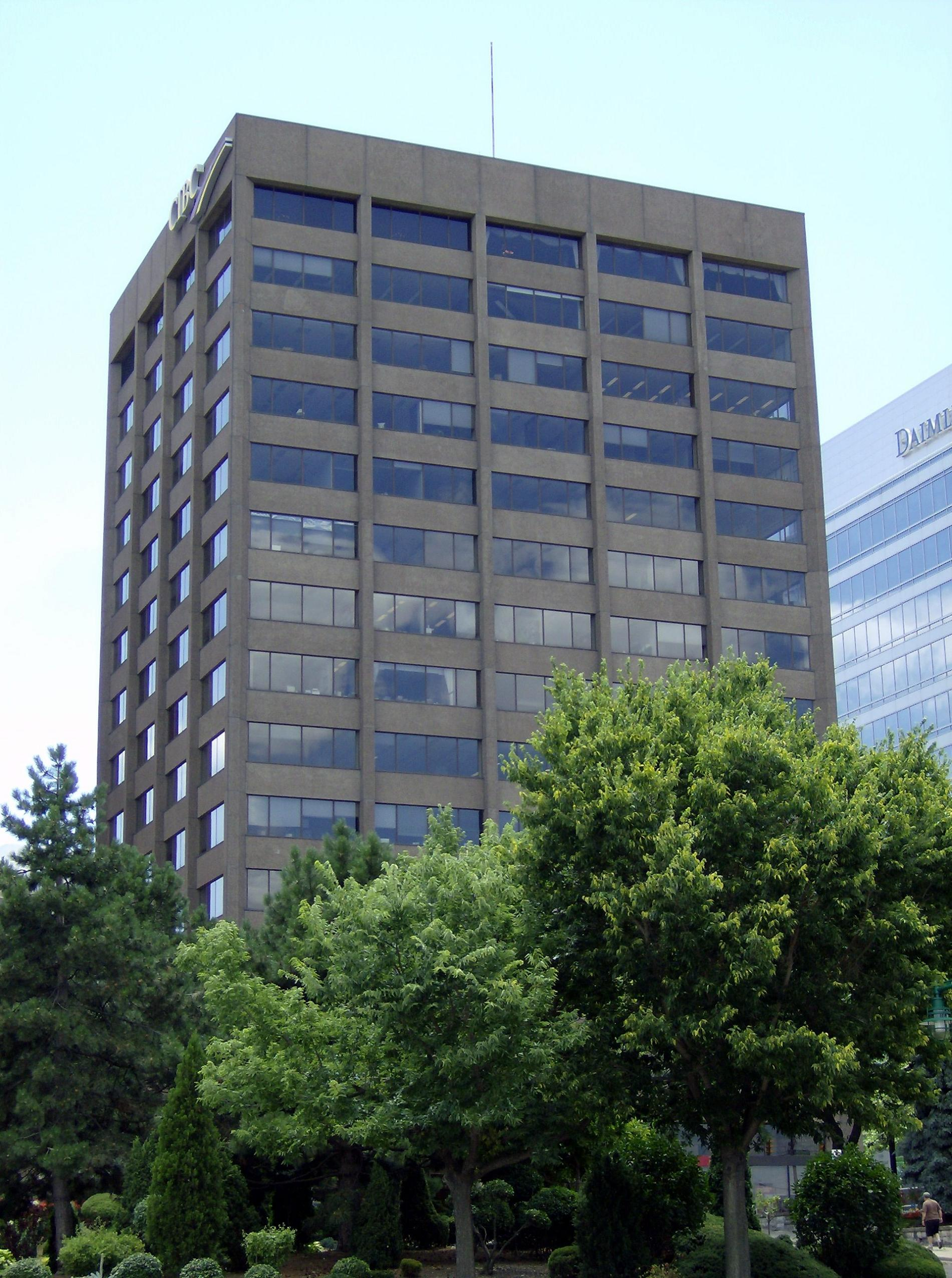
CIBC office tower.

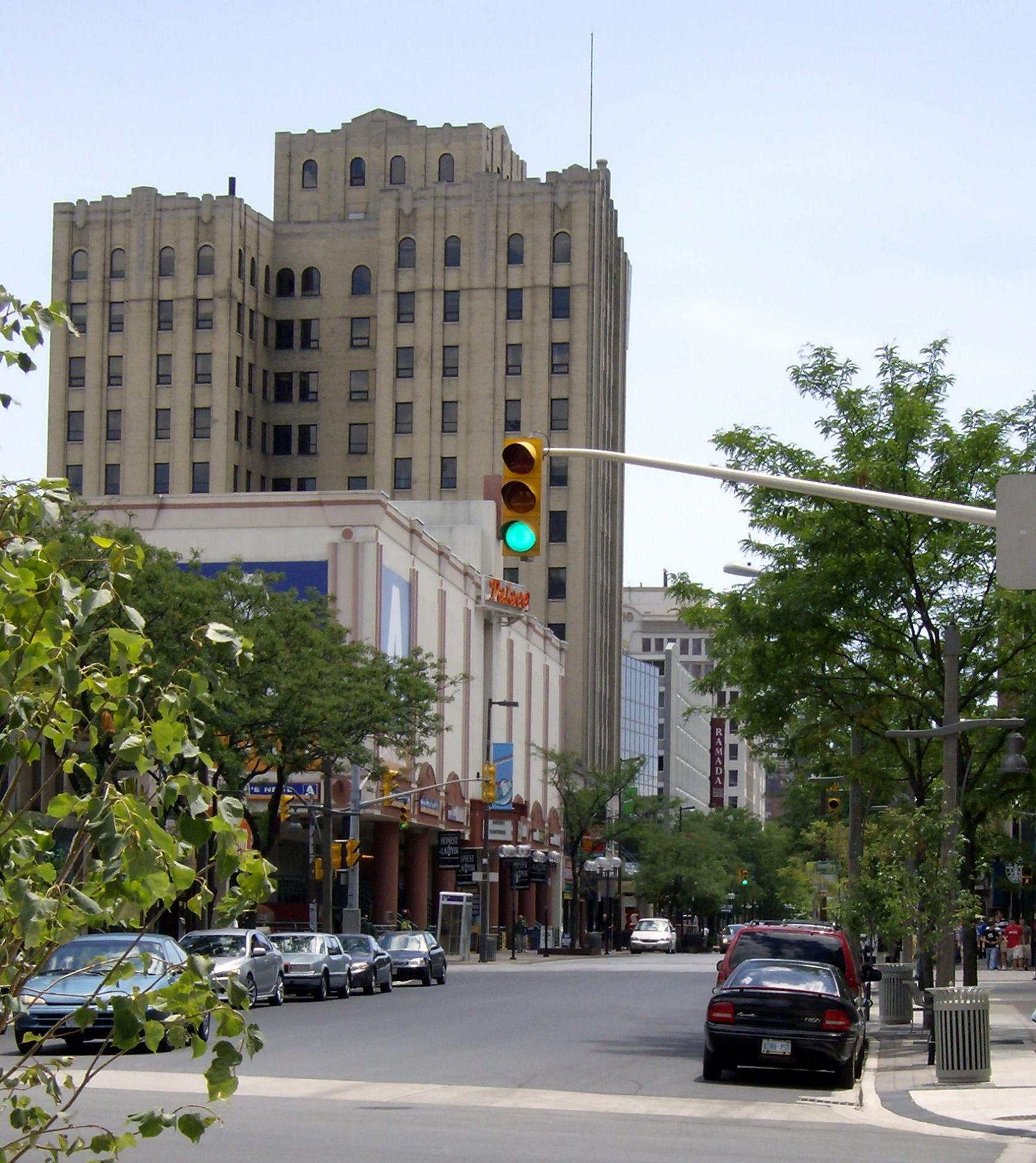
Backside of the Canada Building (Windsor).

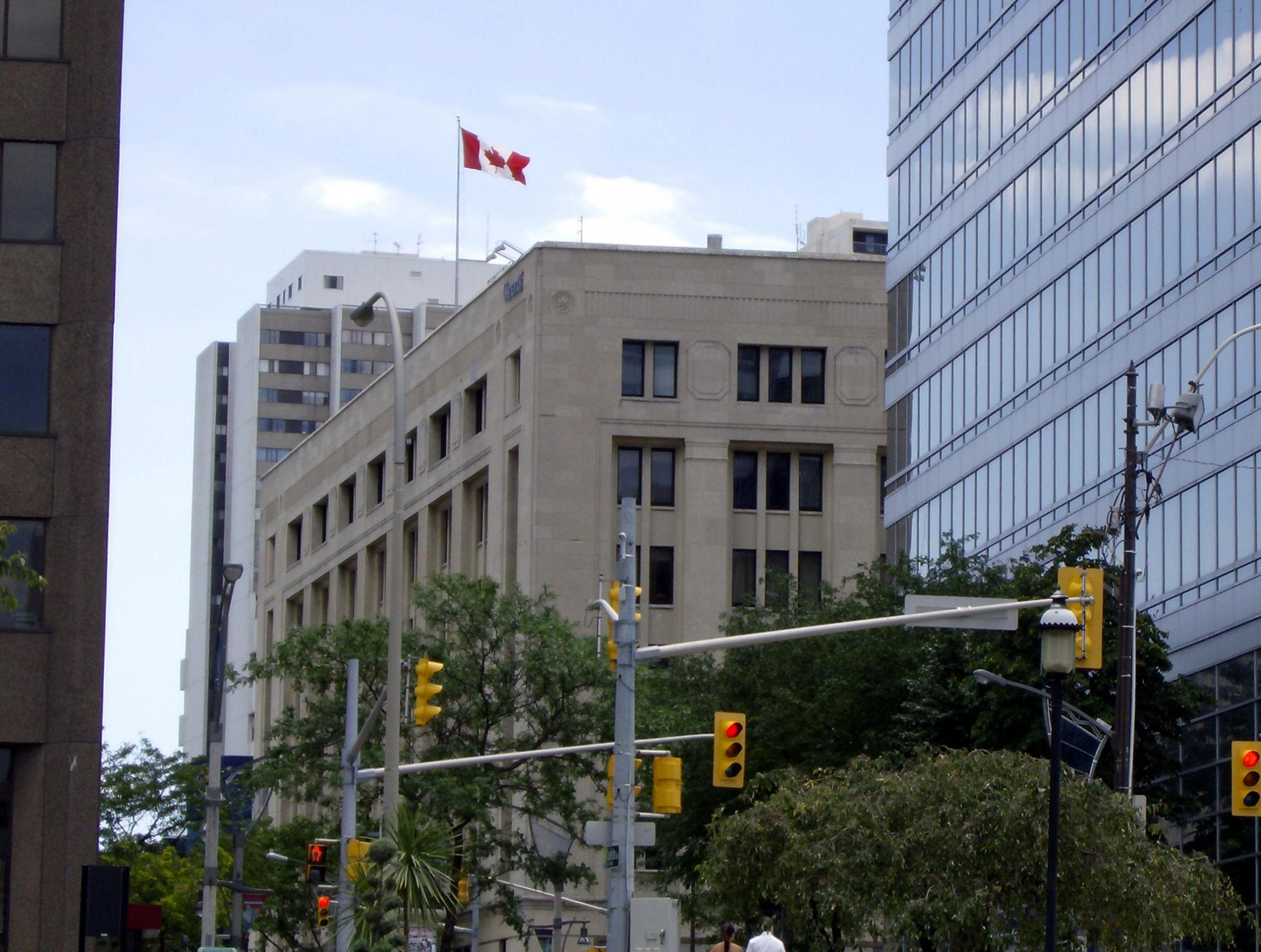
Paul Martin Sr. Building.

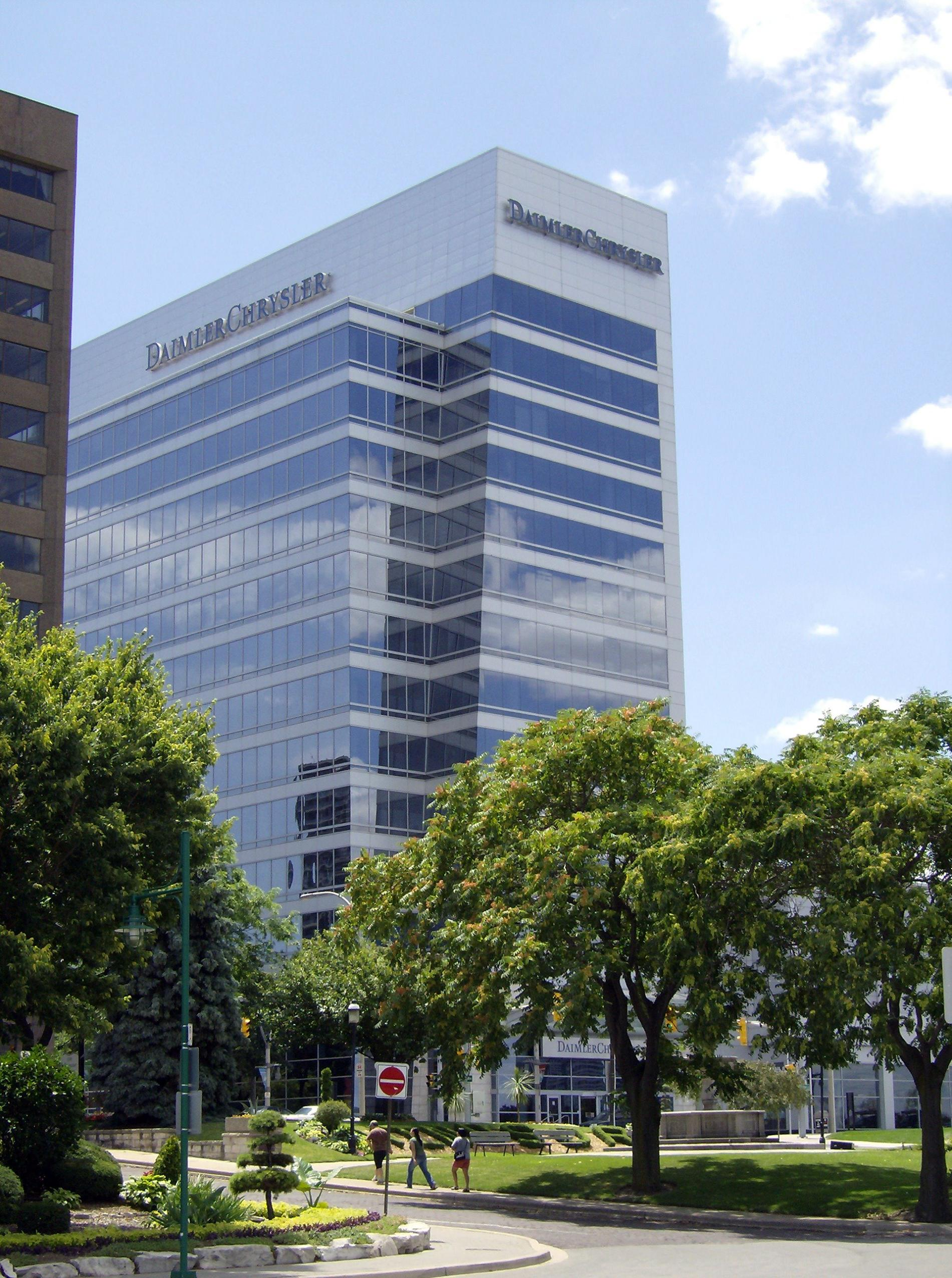
One Riverside Drive, Headquarters of Chrysler Canada.

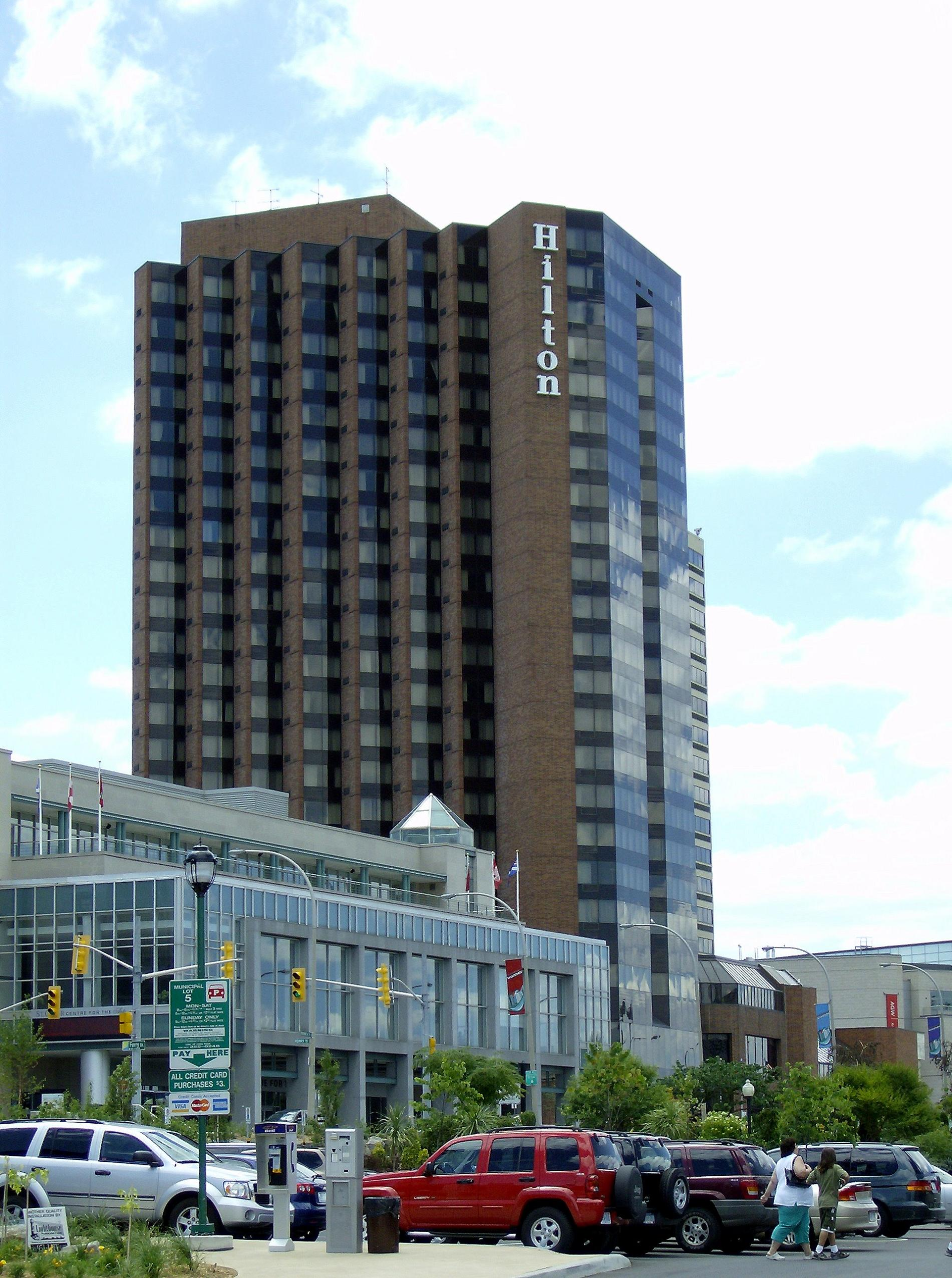
Hilton hotel with all river views.

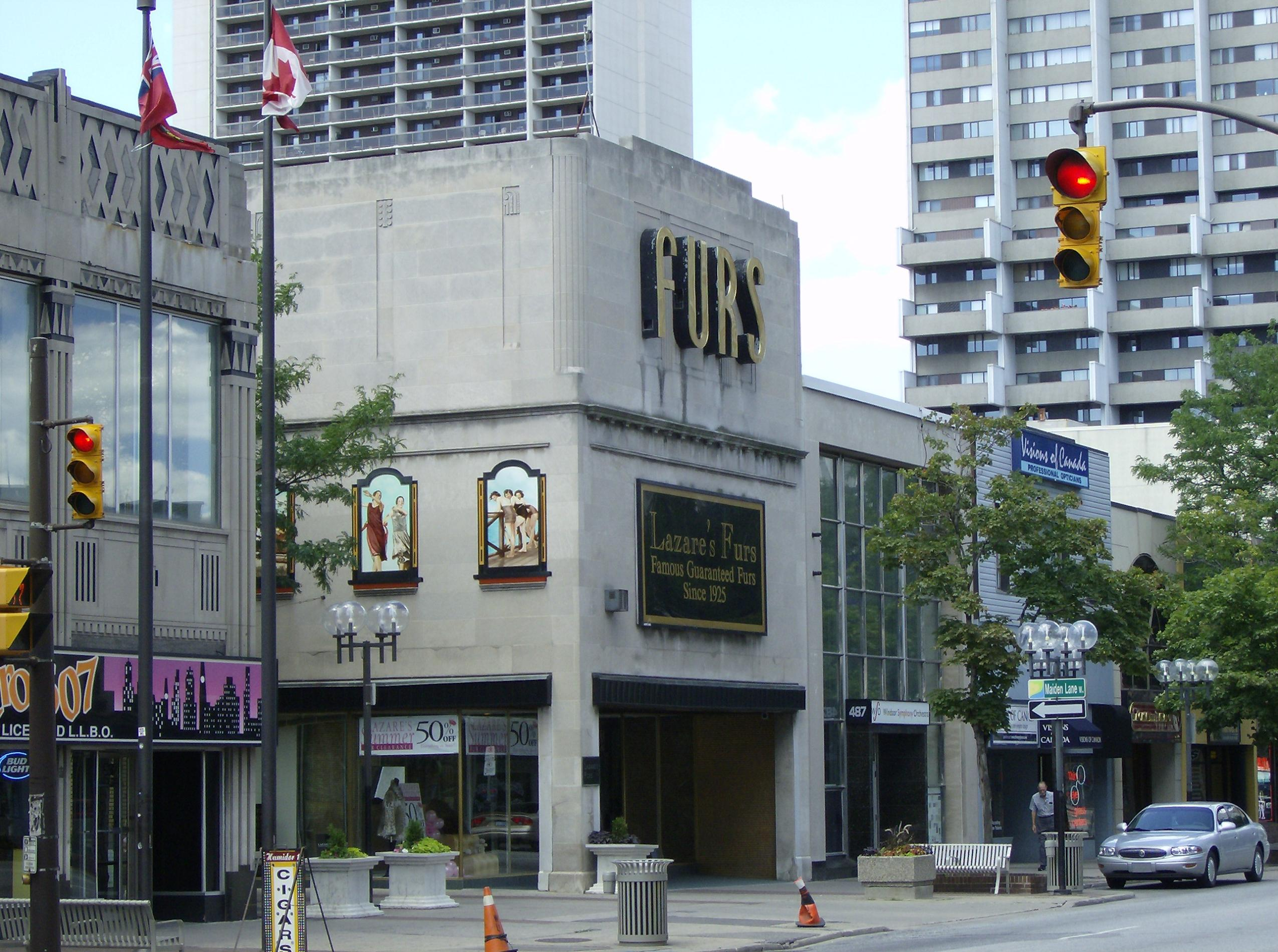
Fur store on Ouellette Avenue

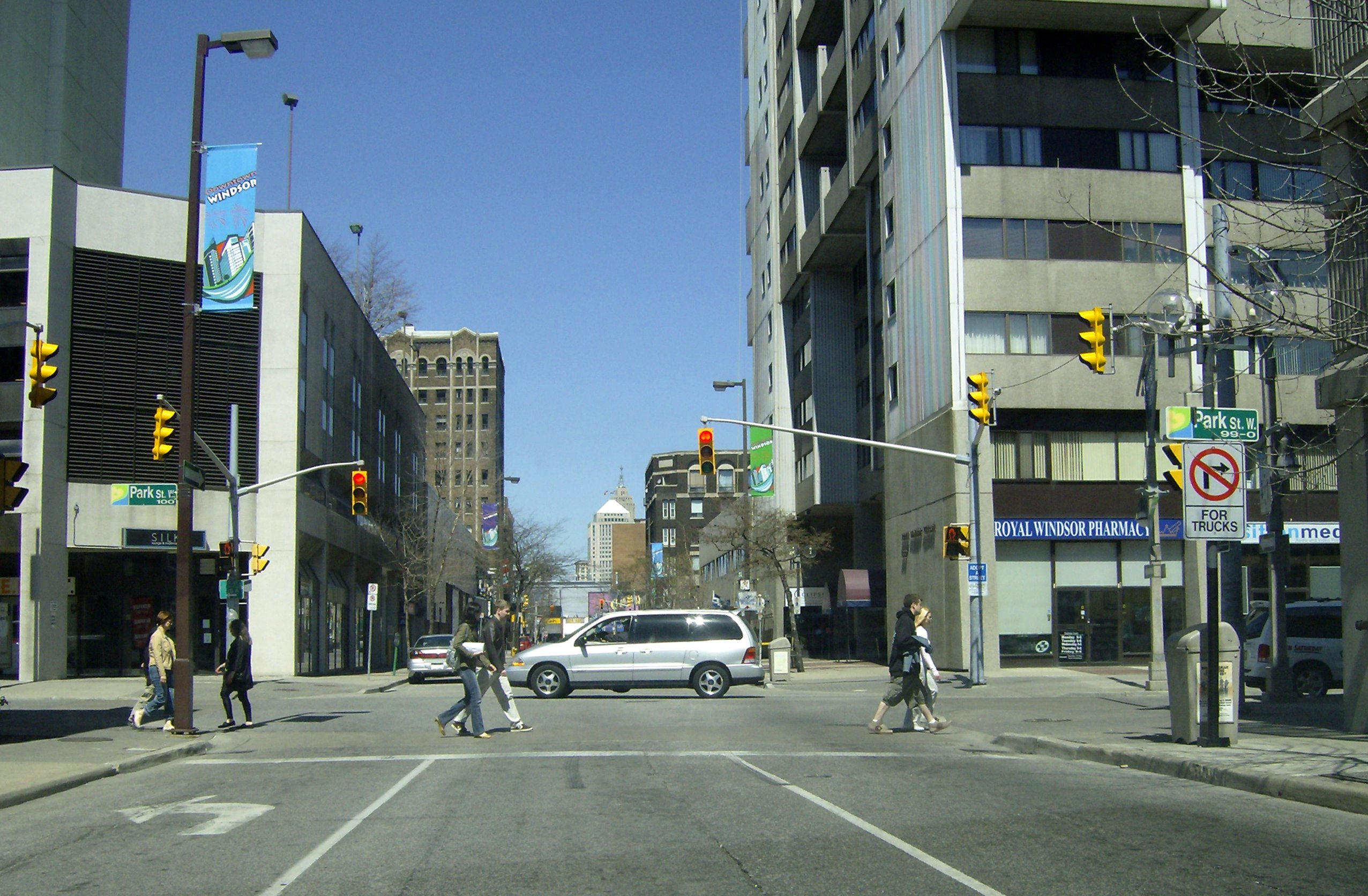
Park and Pelissier Streets in the "Heart of Windsor".

== East End ==
=== Banwell/East Riverside ===
Banwell/East Riverside is a community in Windsor that begun development in 1995. It is bounded by Little River to the west bordering Riverside neighbourhood, Riverside Drive East to the north, the town of Tecumseh's limits to the east and Tecumseh Road to the south. St. Joseph's Catholic High School opened in 2006 at the southwest corner of Clover Street and McHugh Street. This area of Windsor is known for its scenic parks and trails which include some of the highest percentage of urban green space in the region.

=== East Windsor ===
Historical population
Year	Pop.	±%
1921	5,870	—
1931	14,251	+142.8%

East Windsor is a neighbourhood that lies immediately east of Downtown and Walkerville areas but not as far east as Riverside neighbourhood. It borders Walker Road to the west, where the Windsor station (Ontario) is located at its northwestern tip, and Tecumseh Road East to the south. The eastern border is an S-curve that starts around Pillette Road by the river and curves southeast with the CN tracks to Jefferson Blvd.

=== Ford City ===
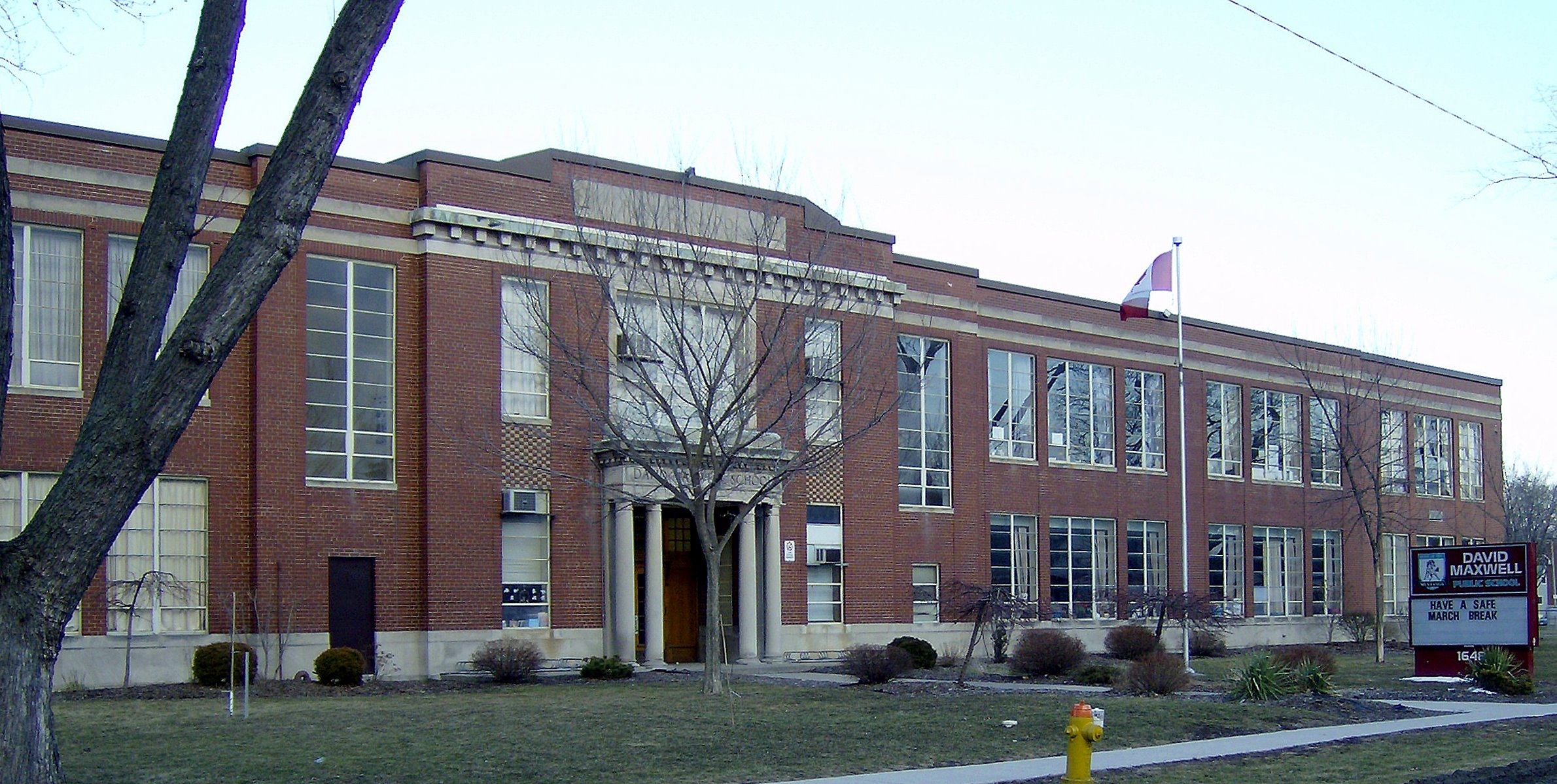
Maxwell Public School on Francois Street was built in 1928.

Ford City was one of the surrounding neighbourhoods amalgamated into Windsor over the years. It was officially incorporated as a village in 1912, becoming a town in 1915. On June 1, 1929, the former Town of Ford was incorporated into the City of East Windsor. The original boundaries of the Town of Ford were surveyed and remapped. It only lasted a few years, as it was amalgamated into Windsor in 1935, at the same time as Sandwich and Walkerville.

Ford City used to be a part of the much larger East End but was recently designated as its own historic neighbourhood. In 2002, signs, murals, and small parkettes began to appear along the length of Drouillard Road. Its boundaries are from Walker Road in the west, along Riverside Drive to Chandler Road, Seminole Street, and George Avenue in the east, and along Tecumseh Road in the south. General Motors and Ford Motor Company of Canada each have a plant here, and the area is somewhat industrial in nature but is slowly shifting towards converting open spaces into small parkettes and community gardens. An example of this is the Ford Test Track, which was transformed from Ford's proving ground into a massive park in the mid-1980s.

=== Forest Glade ===
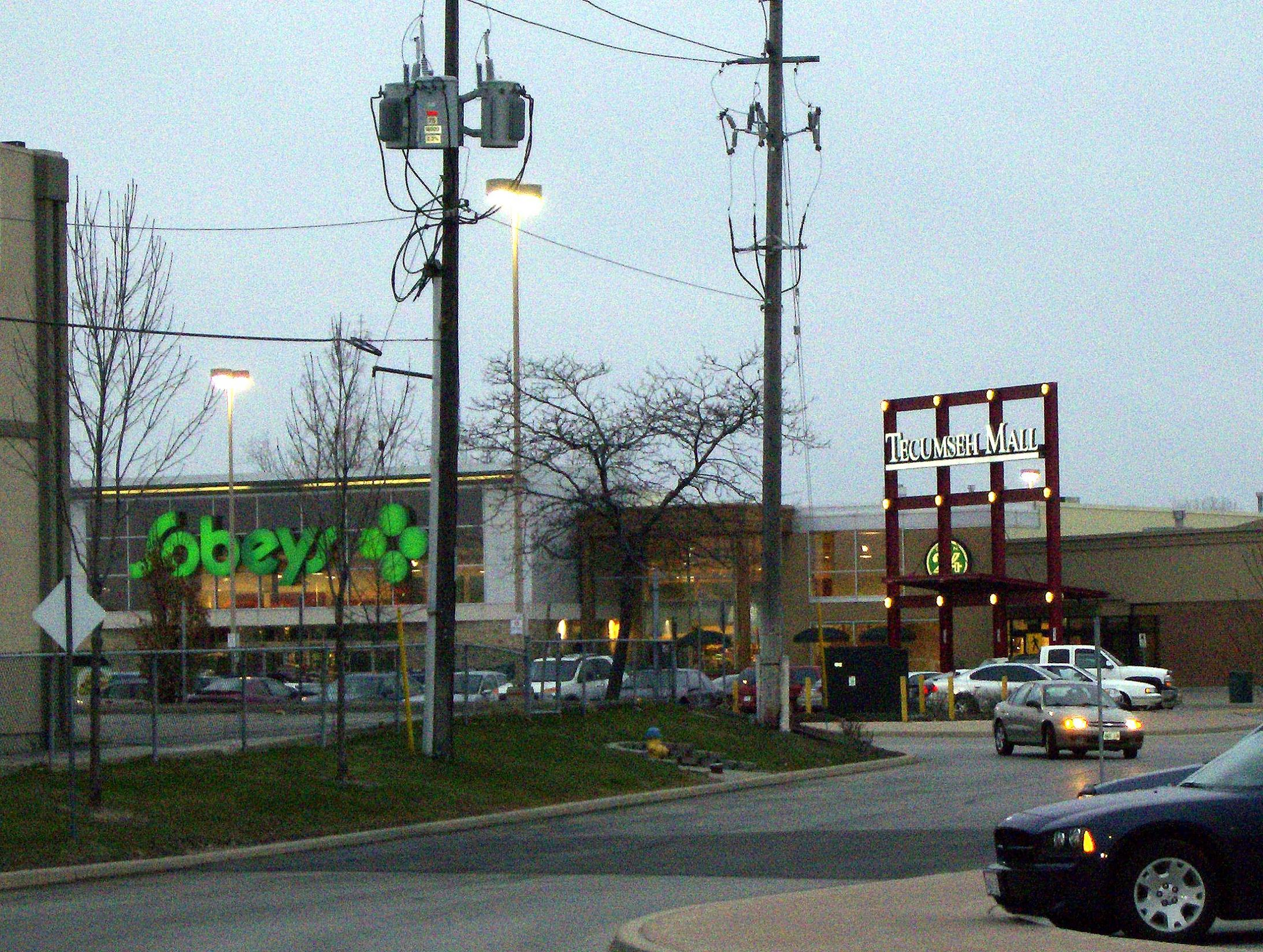
Tecumseh Mall at Lauzon Parkway.

Forest Glade was one of Windsor's premiere model developments. It was "the place to be" in the late 1960s and early 1970s. It is very much a mini-community, with a library, community centre, city bus route access (Transit Windsor's 1C, 4, and 10 routes), and a commercial plaza. The community was built in the late 1960s and early 1970s. Before then, it (as with the surrounding area) was mainly farmland. It is bordered by Lauzon Road to the West, E.C. Row Expressway to the South, Banwell Road to the East, and Tecumseh Road East to the North. Housing in the area consists mostly of owned single-family houses and apartment/condominium buildings, but exceptions do exist. Forest Glade is in close proximity to but does not include Tecumseh Mall.

=== Fontainebleau ===
Fontainebleau is a large neighbourhood in the east end of Windsor. It consists of homes built mainly from the 1950s and 1960s, along with a large public housing townhouse complex along Rivard Avenue, Queen Elizabeth Drive, and Grand Boulevard. It is bordered by Drouillard Road to the west, Jefferson Boulevard to the east, E.C. Row Expressway along the south, and Tecumseh Road along its northern edge. The area is serviced by Transit Windsor's 1C and 4 routes.

=== Little River Acres ===
Little River Acres (formerly The Villages of Riverside) is a small community situated just west of the Little River, with two north-facing entrances off Little River Road and a new third entrance to McHugh Street.

It was built during the 1970s and consists mostly of single-family homes, both owned and rented, in a relatively small area. Land value and pride in ownership are gradually rising, improving the reputation of the area. Within the neighbourhood there are no specific attractions or facilities, but nearby features include a few parks, WFCU Arena, Riverside Secondary School, St. Joseph Catholic Secondary School (Windsor), and an entrance to the Ganatchio Trail. The area is serviced by Transit Windsor's Crosstown 2 route, providing access to much of the city.

=== Pillette Road Village ===
Pillette Road Village is a small community on the edge of Riverside. It is located along Wyandotte Street East, from George Avenue to Thompson Boulevard. It used to be a section of Riverside until it was signed differently as of 1998. The houses in this subdivision tend to be from the 1950s.

=== Polonia Park ===
Polonia Park is a non-profit housing project located in the east of Windsor. This development consists of 342 two and three bedroom units of various configurations. Three levels of rent subsidies are available to qualified tenants. Approximately 20% of the current residents receive some assistance.

=== Riverside ===
Historical population
Year	Pop.	±%
1921	1,155	—
1931	4,432	+283.7%
1941	4,878	+10.1%
1951	9,214	+88.9%
1961	18,089	+96.3%

Riverside is the largest neighbourhood on the east end of Windsor. The neighbourhood stretches from Pillette Road in the west, to Little River in the east, and from the Via/CN line along the south, to the Detroit River and Riverside Drive in the north. Riverside Drive has some of the most expensive and beautiful homes and real estate in the city. Currently, it is used as a commuter thoroughfare but there are discussions in City Council to create bike lanes, speed restrictions, and roundabouts at various intersections to deter through traffic. Riverside was once a separate town, incorporated in 1921, but was amalgamated into Windsor in 1966.

=== Roseville Gardens ===
Roseville Gardens is a small neighbourhood along Rose Street and Rose-Ville Garden Drive. It contains mostly townhouses and apartment buildings, with several shopping plazas nearby.

== West Side ==
This part of Windsor is rich in architecture, history, population backgrounds, and life. It is home to the University of Windsor and Windsor's Chinatown, as well as the Ambassador Bridge. Many residents feel that the west end is facing a decline but various community groups are trying to correct this. The West Side's boundaries are Janette Avenue to the east, Tecumseh Road to the south and the Detroit River to the north and west.

=== RiverWest ===
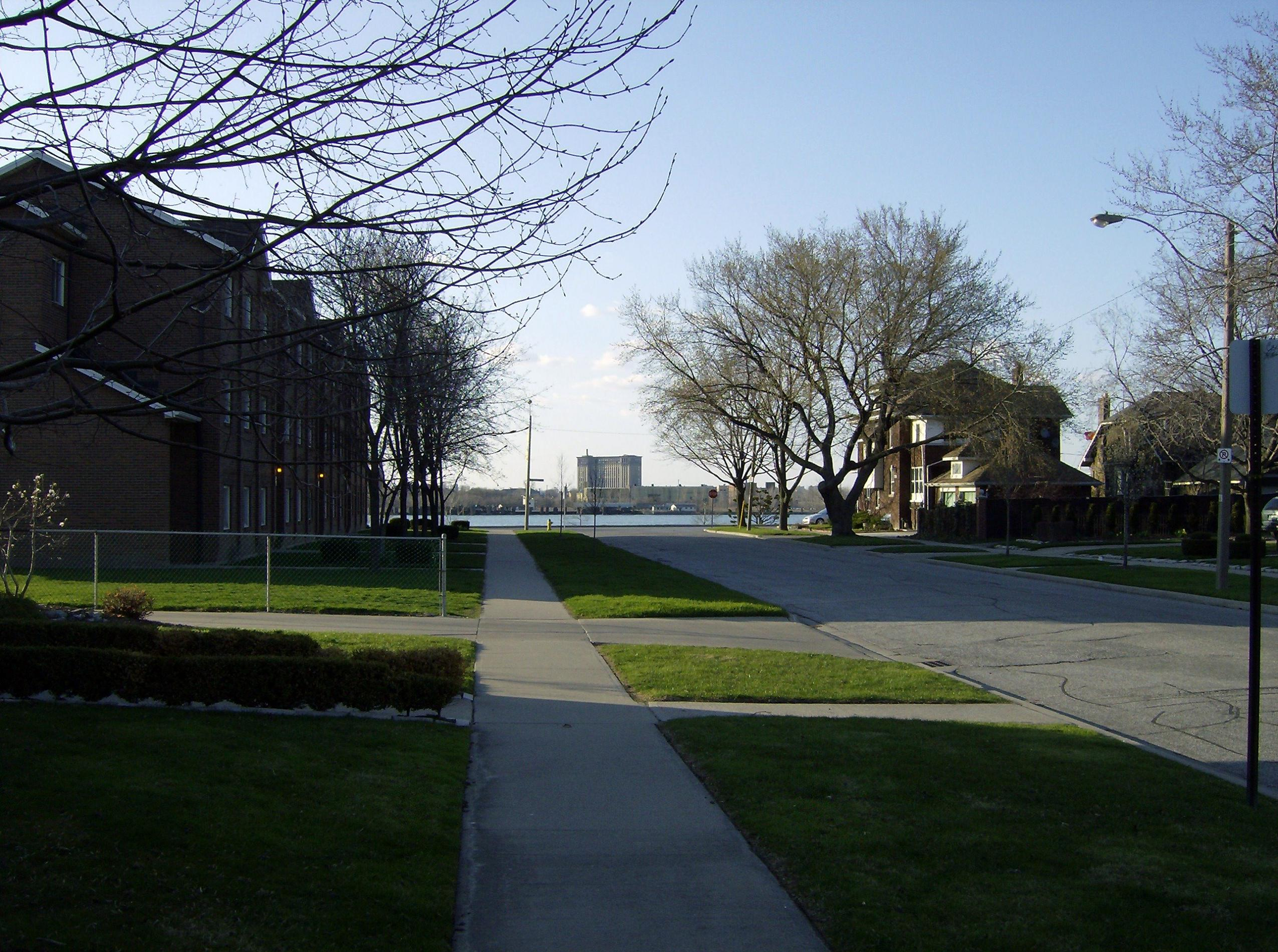
View of Michigan Central Station from Bridgeview neighbourhood.

RiverWest, formerly Bridgeview (also known as "University") until re-branding in 2018, is home to the University of Windsor, and all of its residences. Its boundaries are Rosedale Avenue and Huron Church Road to the west, Tecumseh Road West to the south, Crawford Avenue to the east, and the Detroit River to the north. Its immediate neighbours are Sandwich and West Windsor to the west, South Cameron Woodlot to the south and Downtown to the east.

=== Brighton Beach ===
Brighton Beach is an unincorporated area that is mainly industrial. It is considered Windsor's only failed subdivision. It is the location of the Brighton Beach Generating Station on the shores of the Detroit River, and was the Canadian landfall of the 1946 Windsor–Tecumseh tornado of June 17, 1946.

=== Morton Industrial Park ===
Morton Industrial Park is situated along the Detroit River, next to the LaSalle town limits. It contains the Windsor salt mine.

=== Ojibway ===
Ojibway is a very large semi-rural area in south-west Windsor. It stretches from Ojibway Parkway and E.C. Row Expressway in the west and north to Huron Church Road in the east, and Windsor City Limits in the south. It is very lightly developed, and still largely wooded. It also contains Ojibway Park and Ojibway Prairie Provincial Nature Reserve, at one time the Windsor Raceway, a former casino slots and harness racing facility; Essex Terminal Railway's Ojibway Yard, and Ambassador Golf Club designed by noted course architect Thomas McBroom.

Ojibway was a separate village from Windsor, having been incorporated as a town in 1913. It was not amalgamated with the City of Windsor until 1966, at the same time as the town of Riverside, Ontario.

=== Sandwich ===
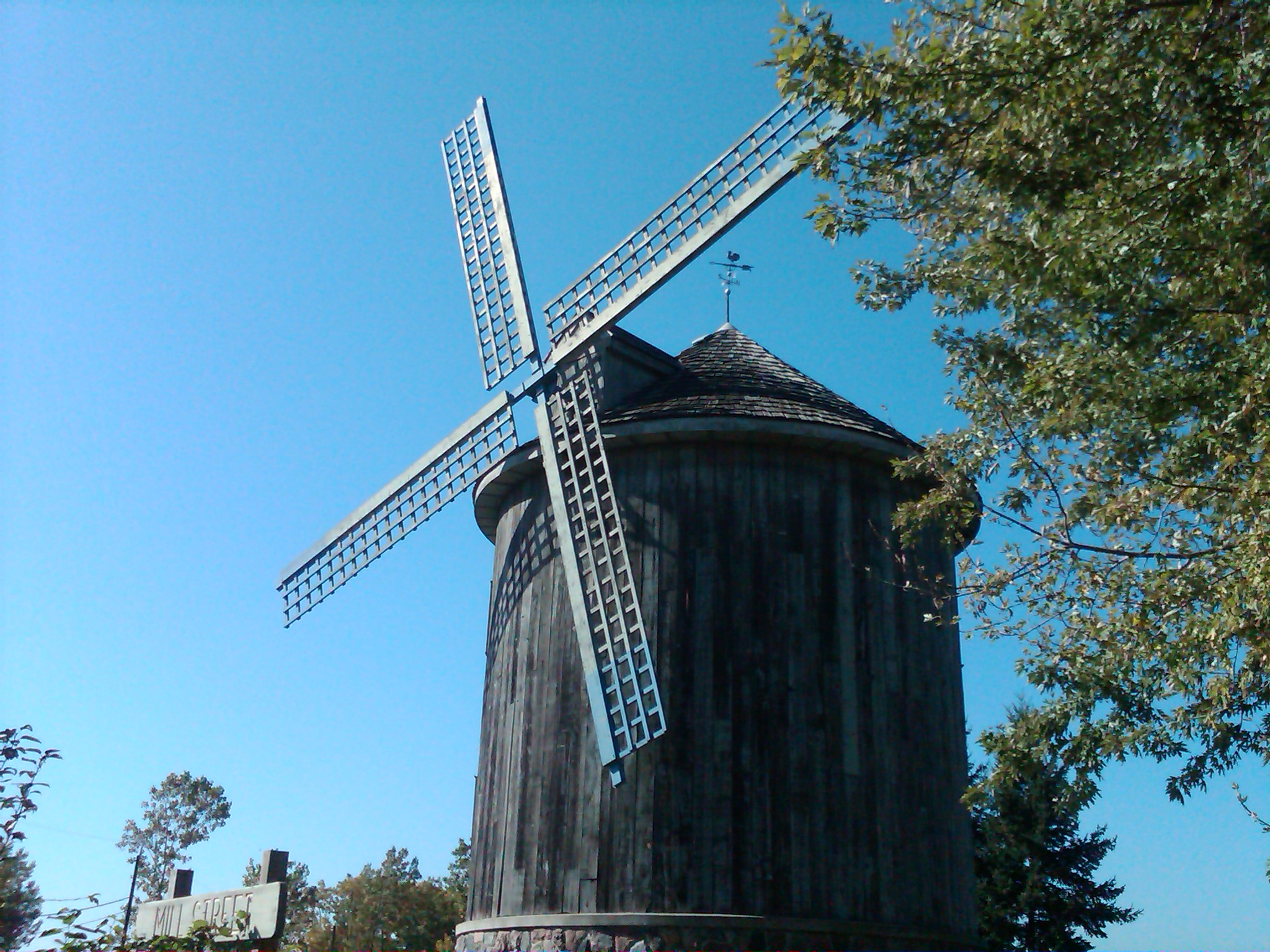
Mill Park, in the Sandwich neighbourhood, showing the namesake windmill.

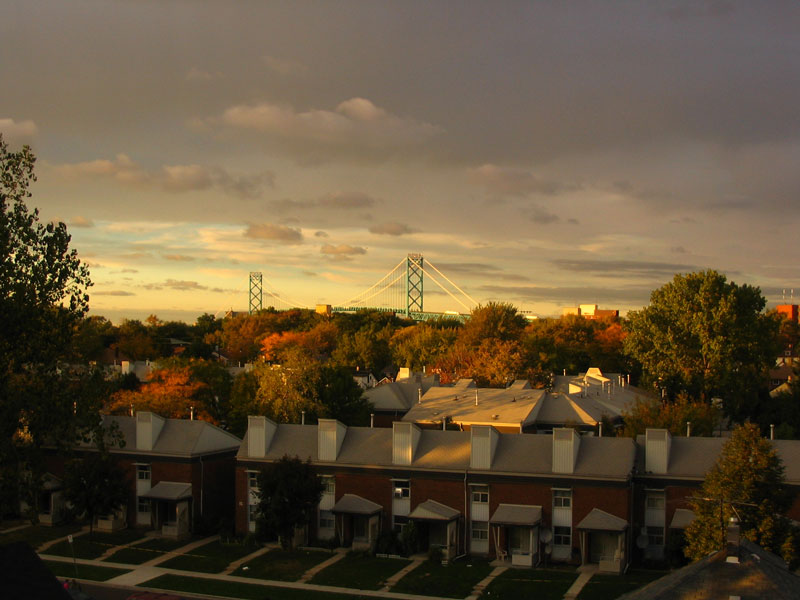
Overlooking the Ambassador Bridge from Windsor during fall, near dusk

Historical population
Year	Pop.	±%
1871	1,160	—
1881	1,143	−1.5%
1891	1,352	+18.3%
1901	1,450	+7.2%
1911	2,302	+58.8%
1921	4,415	+91.8%
1931	10,715	+142.7%

Sandwich Towne was first settled in 1749 as a French agricultural settlement, making it the oldest continually inhabited settlement in Canada west of Montreal. Many buildings and houses date to the mid-19th century. The neighbourhood is bounded by Detroit Street and Rosedale Boulevard along the northern edge, by the Essex Terminal Railway to the east and south, and the Detroit River to the west. The Windmill in Mill Park is a replica of an original Windmill. This neighbourhood was also the site of one of the major battles during the War of 1812, and the Windsor Rebellion of 1837, and as a battlefront of the Patriot War later in 1837. This neighbourhood is very proud of its rich and diverse history, having murals on many buildings' sides that show people, events, and buildings of the past, such as Ms. B. McKewan Arnold, the great-niece of the famous Benedict Arnold, founding a hospital/nursing station in Sandwich, and of how slaves fled from the southern United States and the Confederate States to freedom in Sandwich through the Underground Railroad before slavery was abolished.

Sandwich was established in 1817 as a Town with no municipal status. It was incorporated as a town in 1858 (the same time as neighbouring Windsor was incorporated as a town). Sandwich lasted as an independent town until 1935, when it was amalgamated with Walkerville into Windsor. In the summer of 2007, the neighbourhood of Sandwich was officially "connected" to the rest of the Windsor Bike Trail network, with bike lanes being extended along University Avenue (where it meets the Riverfront Trail/West Side Recreationway) to Sandwich Street, all the way to Prince Road, where it meets up with the College Avenue Recreationway, and is now among the most-connected neighbourhoods in terms of bike trails and bike lanes within it.

Sandwich Methodist Church was notably served by the controversial Reverend J. O. L. Spracklin, who was tried and acquitted of manslaughter after shooting a liquor trader in 1920.

Residents of the area have been voicing concern that their neighbourhood is being forgotten or neglected for other richer areas of the city (as it is the poorest neighbourhood in Windsor), with the closure of its only bank branch (a CIBC office, now vacant), and the loss of the local Shoppers Drug Mart, which concerns many in the area. Rexall has opened a store beside the former Shoppers Drug Mart. The neighbourhood contains many abandoned houses, including a long stretch on the east side of Indian Road. While neighbourhoods with a high concentration of vacant houses are a common phenomenon in nearby Detroit, they are very rarely found in Canadian cities, even those that have experienced large population decreases.

However, the neighbourhood still maintains the former County Courthouse and municipal building and current community centre, Mackenzie Hall (built in 1855) by Alexander MacKenzie, the second Prime Minister of Canada, the Duff-Baby House (built in 1798) and a multi-purpose building which houses General Brock Public School, a Windsor Police Department precinct, and a branch of the Windsor Public Library and all at its famous "Bedford Square" (intersection of Brock Street and Sandwich Street).

Explore the self-guided tour to learn more about the history and heritage of the former town of Sandwich.

=== South Cameron Woodlot ===
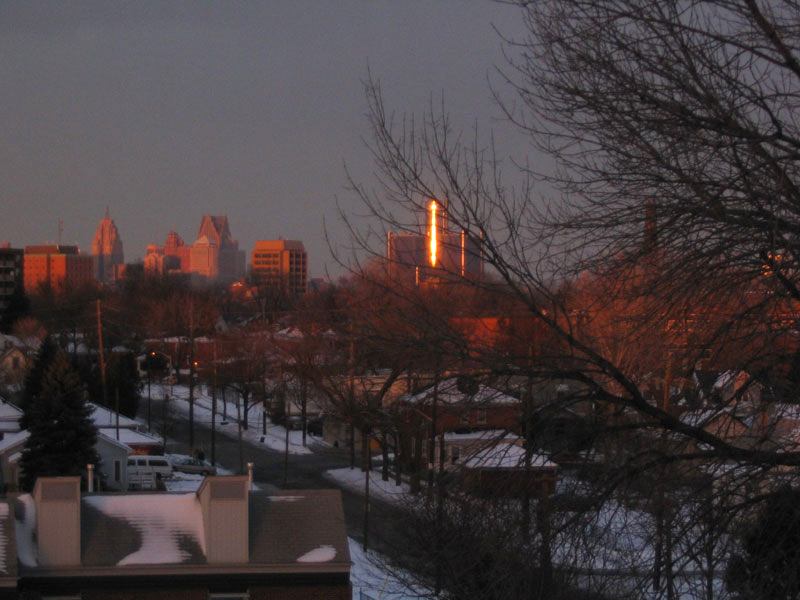
Detroit as seen from Windsor

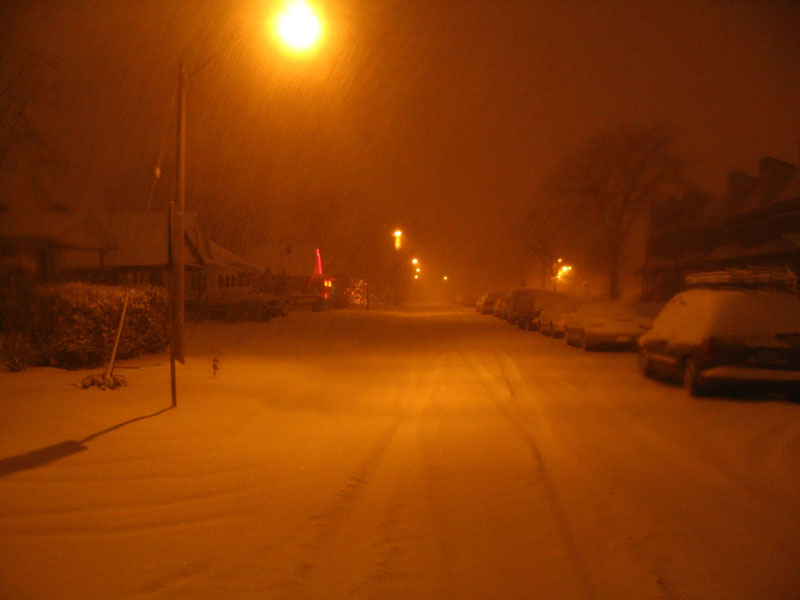
Snowstorm in December, Windsor

The South Cameron Woodlot is a neighbourhood that stretches west from South Cameron Boulevard to Huron Church Road, and south from Tecumseh Road West to Northwood Street. One of Windsor's main thoroughfares connecting the north and south ends of the city is Dominion Boulevard. When South Windsor was being built in the 1950s and 1960s, many residents referred to it as Tin Can Alley because there was nothing there. Today, homes are all along this street and there is increasing development into the old woodlots on both the east and west sides of Dominion.

=== West Windsor ===
West Windsor incorporates the built-up areas and neighbourhoods in a triangle from the Essex Terminal Railway, to Huron Church Road, to E.C. Row Expressway. Its population is roughly 20,000 people. It is also occasionally listed as "Malden" in maps containing neighbourhoods, from the large Malden Park inside it.

=== Yawkey ===
Yawkey is a small area in the northwest corner of Ojibway. It was named after Tom Yawkey, onetime owner of the Boston Red Sox and previous owner of the adjacent Ojibway Park, formerly known as Yawkey Bush. It includes Armanda Street and Broadway Avenue, Ojibway Parkway and E.C. Row Expressway, with Malden Road as its eastern edge. It is largely rural, although the Detroit River International Crossing Study { DRIC } identifies it as the projected route of a multilane expressway.

== South Side ==
=== Devonshire Heights ===
Devonshire Heights is a development in Windsor's south end begun in the late 1970s and recently completed. It is located just south of the E.C. Row Expressway, west of Windsor Airport around Walker Road, east of Howard Avenue and Devonshire Mall and north of the area around Provincial, 6th Concession and Division Roads. Some maps include the main commercial artery of Walker Road, which includes as far south as the SilverCity Windsor Cinema.

=== Remington Park ===
Remington Park was originally a town and farming area in Sandwich East Township before it was amalgamated with the city of Windsor, Ontario. Created in the late 1920s, The boundaries were Howard Avenue on the west, Parent Avenue on the east, Grand Marais on the south and South Pacific on the north. Remington Park is a large subdivision between South Walkerville and E.C. Row Expressway. It is home and former home to very proud alumni of residents. Former Windsor Mayor Mike Hurst was from Remington Park. The Park has a dog park and the Remington Booster public pool, tennis courts, a basketball court, a clubhouse, a baseball diamond, soccer pitch, walking and cycling path and a children's playground. In the 1970s the area seen many active environmental and political activists to improve the neighbourhood. In the 1980s the area expanded to include developing into the farming land to the east of Parent Avenue up to Walker Road.

=== Roseland ===
Roseland is a neighbourhood in the southern tip of Windsor bordered by Cabana Road West/East to the north, the Rt. Hn. Herb Gray Parkway to the south and Provincial Road to the east. It borders South Windsor to the north, LaSalle, Ontario to the west, commercial areas around Walker and Provincial Roads in Devonshire Heights to the east and Tecumseh, Ontario to the southeast. Many homes in the neighbourhood were built prior to the Second World War on very large, spacious lots.

=== Sandwich South ===
The Township of Sandwich South was originally merged into the Town of Tecumseh in 1998. The area east of Lauzon Road was transferred to the City of Windsor in 2002. The area is mainly farmland, but includes Windsor Airport and Highway 401 as well as some residential development.

=== South Windsor ===
Most of the homes were built between 1950 and the present. It consists of many small ranch style homes as well as larger newer homes. It has several elementary schools, with Vincent Massey Secondary School as the public high school and Holy Names High School as the Catholic high school, respectively. It is bordered by the Rt Hon. Herb Gray Parkway to the west, Cabana Road West/East to the south, Division and Provincial Roads to the east and E.C. Row Expressway to the north.

== See also ==
- List of townships in Ontario
