= Riverfront Bike Trail =

Bike trail in Windsor, Ontario, Canada

Coordinates: 42.31285°N 83.06483°W

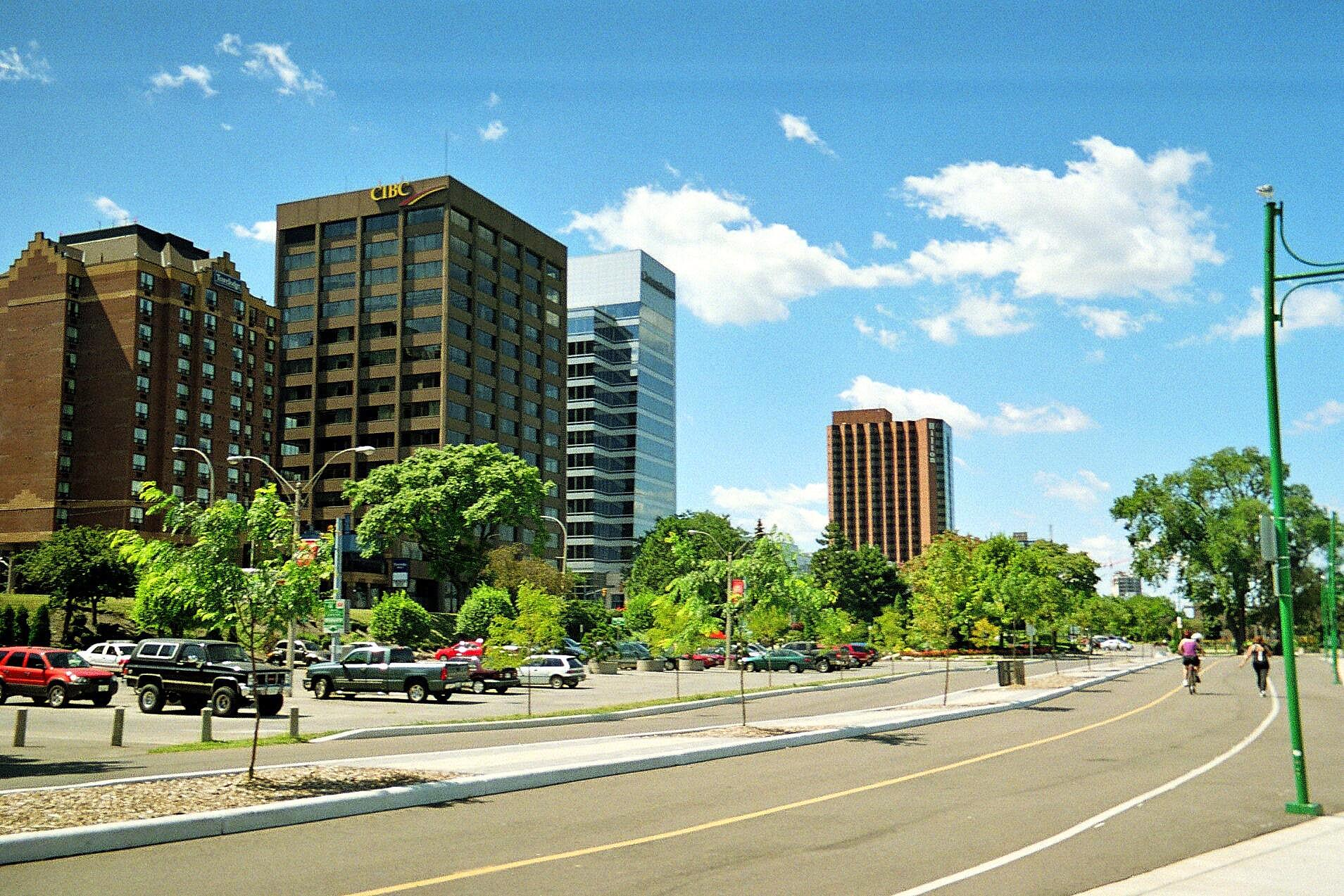
- River Walk Bike Trail in downtown Windsor
- Length: 8.0 km (5.0 mi)
- Location: University, Downtown, Walkerville
- Designation: Trans Canada Trail
- Trailheads: Highway 3/Ambassador Bridge in Windsor, Ontario; George Avenue and Wyandotte Street
- Waymark

The Roy A. Battagello River Walk Bike Trail is the backbone of the "Windsor Loop" bike trail network in Windsor, Ontario. The bike trail travels from the foot of the Ambassador Bridge (at Peter Street and Huron Church Road), to traffic lights at Riverside Drive and Lincoln Avenue (continuing as bike lanes to George Avenue and Wyandotte Street, for a total distance of 8.0 km (5.0 mi)). This makes the trail the second-longest trail in the City of Windsor (the longest being the mostly-unpaved West Windsor Recreationway), at 8.0 km.

The trail travels through Windsor's downtown, and many of its parks, such as Dieppe Gardens. Many cities across North America (such as Detroit, Michigan, Toledo, Ohio, Toronto, Ontario, New York City, New York, and San Francisco, California) have expressed interest in similar riverfront parkland and bike trails, and many (such as Detroit) have already started construction on their own parks and trails. Throughout its history, the trail was repeatedly widened and upgraded, and even is paved with the original asphalt and cement used on the Ambassador Bridge. The trail has a posted speed limit of 20 km/h.

== Start and end points ==
The bike trail starts officially at Peter Street and Huron Church Road, across the street from the University of Windsor. It crosses several streets via traffic lights, and ends at Lincoln Avenue and Riverside Drive at another pair of stoplights. It continues down Riverside Drive as a pair of Bike Lanes, towards Strabane Avenue. However, between Riverside Drive/Huron Church Road, and Lincoln Avenue, there are no stoplights, providing a very quick and effective way of travelling across the city. One feature found only on River Walk Bike Trail and the Ganatchio Trail are that they are wide-enough for three "lanes" each way, meaning three bicycles can drive abreast in each direction without worrying about a collision. It is along this part of the bike trail that the Odette Sculpture Garden is located.

== Service centers ==
The Riverfront Trail is unique among the City of Windsor's Bike Trails, in having service centers along its route. There are five service centers along the trail. One is located at the intersection of Riverside Drive and Huron Church Roads, one at the foot of Askin Avenue, one at Bridge Avenue, one situated in front of Caesars Windsor and Civic Terrace, and one along the park and trail near the Hiram Walker/Canadian Club Distillery.

== Connections with other trails ==
The Riverfront Trail currently connects to the Russell Street Neighbourhood Trail and the College Avenue Recreationway via Bike-Friendly Routes (sign-designated residential streets used as connectors, where cyclists have more safety than on busy arterial roads). The Russell Street Neighbourhood Trail will have a direct connection to the Riverfront Trail within the next 10 years. See the Expansion section below for more information.

Heading along the College Avenue Recreationway, a cyclist can reach Ojibway Park, Spring Garden ANSI (Area of Natural Scientific Interest), and even the La Salle Trail Network in LaSalle, Ontario.

At the end of the bike lanes on Riverside Drive, one can access the bike trail through Alexander Park (at the lighted intersection) with Strabane Avenue.

== Trans-Canada Trail ==
In 2003, the City of Windsor began placing small Trans-Canada Trail signs along the Trail's route, from the Ambassador Bridge to Church Street, its current "ending". This may be a sign of a future link with the Chrysler Canada Greenway, which travels all the way through Harrow, Ontario, through Kingsville, Ontario to Leamington, Ontario. The City of Windsor intends on signing the Trans Canada Trail along the Riverfront Bike Trail (and the West Windsor Recreationway) to its link with the LaSalle Trail, in LaSalle, Ontario, with a separate link heading to the current Chrysler Canada Greenway.

== Cleary Guest House ==
The Cleary Guest House (also known as the Queen Elizabeth rest stop) was the focus of a recent controversy in regard to tearing down the structure and replacing it with a new service center of the same name. On May 8, 2007, the Cleary Guest House was torn down (and a temporary detour for the trail was made), to make way for a "Peace Beacon". See below for what has succeeded the Queen Elizabeth Guest House.

== Upgrades ==
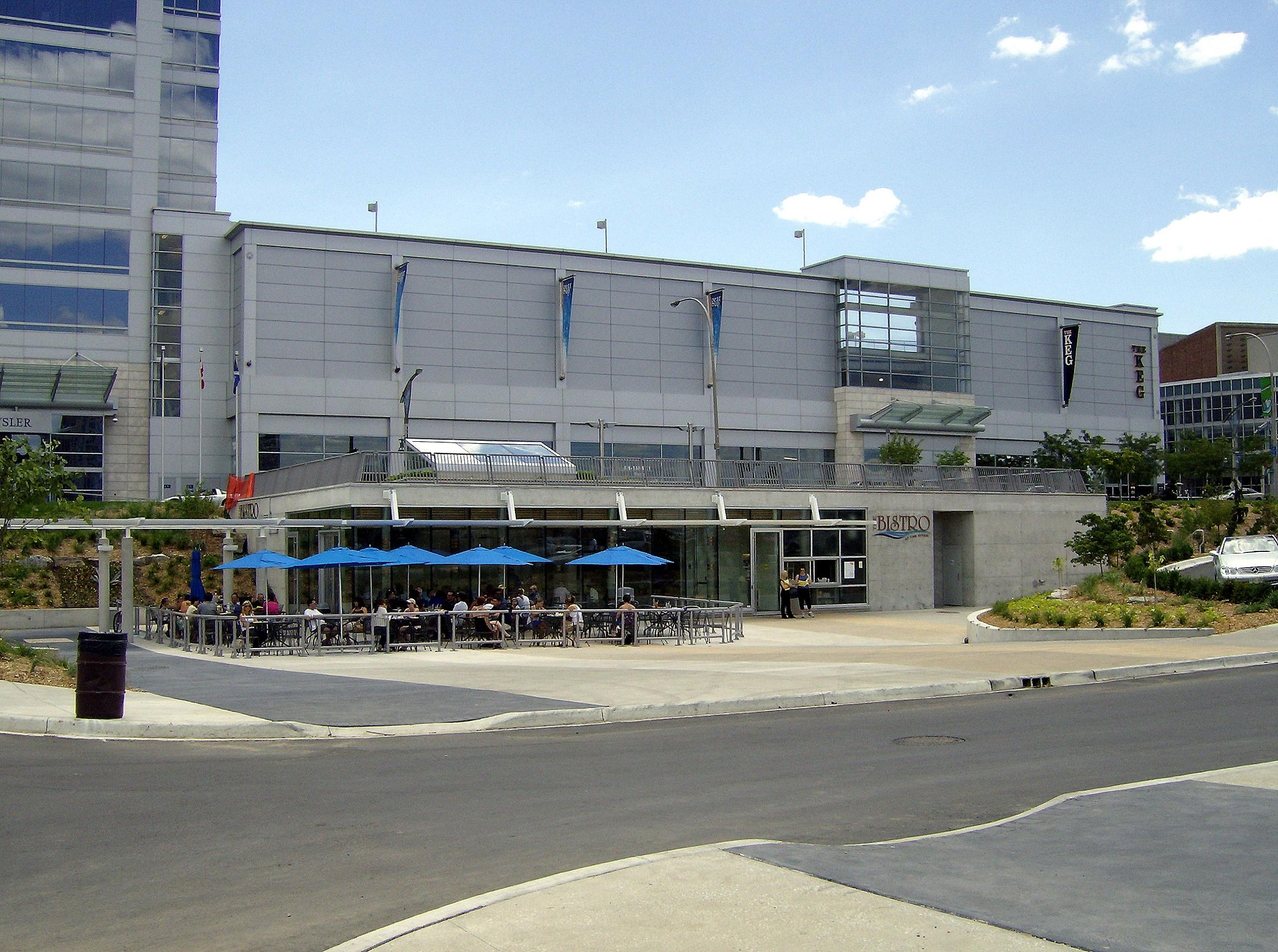
"The Bistro at the River" opened in summer 2007.

In June 2006, construction and upgrades were completed near the Caron Street Pumping Station, just across from the CBC Windsor television studio. The pedestrian traffic was segregated onto its own path, and cyclists were given priority over a small portion of the bike trail (around a kilometre in length), with the introduction of a playground and expanded (and paved) parking lot for people to park and ride.

The city and Windsor Star have done a poll on AM 800 CKLW at the beginning of September 2006, and the respondents said they would like to have a small casual restaurant along the trail (such as a pizza stall), near the Cleary Guest House for joggers, park-goers, and cyclists. The City of Windsor commented that it would be below-ground, to keep parkland open and allow an unobstructed view of the Detroit skyline.

In place of the torn-down Queen Elizabeth Guest House, a much larger and better-accessible restaurant was built into the hillside at the corner of Ouellette Avenue and Riverside Drive, with an expanded parking lot next to it. The new restaurant is named "The Bistro at the River" and is run by the local "Naples Pizza" chain of pizza parlours.

The parking lot at Dieppe gardens has been expanded, along with the grassed parkland and flower gardens. The Rivefront Trail has also been re-aligned and straightened, with sidewalks linking the Riverfront Trail to The Bistro at the River, and its new parking lot.

== Talks of expansion ==
Recently, the City of Windsor's Department of Parks and Recreation, announced a 1.1 m extension along Riverside Drive to link the Russell Street Recreationway, although no timeline has been set, but will incorporate the sidewalk into a widened bike trail, which will minimize costs and congestion.

As of 2006, Windsor City Council has been in talks with CN Rail and Hiram Walker Distillery on buying a spur line, and converting the railroad tracks into a rail trail, for easy connection to the Ganatchio Trail and the Little River Extension in the east end. This is boosted by the fact that the Via Rail train station downtown ("Windsor-Walkerville") is old and over-crowded. The City even has several plans in the event of a relocation of railways:

- Via trains would be re-routed to use the tracks near the Windsor Airport, placing them on the same rails that the Amtrak trains use, possibly allowing for quicker Chicago-Toronto passenger service (instead of via Sarnia, Ontario)
- Hiram Walker Distillery would be provided compensation for the loss of railway, in an unspecified manner. The tracks would be torn up in favour of a road or long park and cycleway, making the city much safer, as many people have died in fatal automobile-train accidents.
- The trains would use the same tracks (towards the Michigan Central Railway Tunnel into Detroit), which is very probable, given the DRTP proposal for turning the tunnel into a two-lane truck tunnel is nearly dead.
- Until the railway can be bought (and if the deal fails), the bike lanes along Wyandotte Street East would be extended to St. Rose Avenue, where they would meet the Ganatchio Trail.
- Although the trail is indirectly connected to the nearby Russell Street Neighbourhood Trail, there is no direct connection yet, and many people have been wanting City Council to approve a direct connection along Riverside Drive. This has been announced that it will go through, but may take a few years, as more pressing bike trails require attention (such as the cross-town connection to the Ganatchio Trail). This link will make travel to the Sandwich Town neighbourhood safer. Another possible link is the Riverside Drive Vista Project. See that article for more information.
- The City of Windsor's Parks and Recreation department has rectified the gap between the Riverfront Trail and Sandwich Towne and its Russell Street Neighbourhood Trail, by extending bicycle lanes along University Avenue and Sandwich Street, all the way to Prince Road.

=== Windsor Loop ===
The City of Windsor has expressed intentions on creating a bike trail, bike lane, and signed-route/Bike-Friendly Street "beltway around Windsor, using pre-existing routes, lanes, and trails, and adding new ones to streets. The trail would use the Riverfront Bike Trail and Ganatchio Trail to the north, the West Windsor Recreationway to the west, a new alignment following Cabana Road to the Devonwood Conservation Area. The Loop would also follow the current Devonwood Bike Trail, following along North Service Road and E.C. Row Expressway to the subdivision of Forest Glade, where it would turn north on Lauzon Road (not Lauzon Parkway), and follow the current signed route and path along Hawthorne Drive (a residential street), to the Little River Extension, before meeting back up with the Ganatchio Trail at the roundabout/traffic circle. This route has not been completed yet, but several segments are already in place. The loop has a couple crossings at E.C. Row interchanges, which are extremely busy, and could pose a potential safety hazard to cyclists. The city hopes to finish the Loop "within the next 20 years".

== See also ==
- Cycling in Detroit
- Grand Marais Trail
- Ganatchio Trail
- Little River Extension
- Russell Street Neighbourhood Trail
- Devonwood Bike Trail
- Riverside Drive Vista Project
- Bike Trails in the City of Windsor
- Trans-Canada Trail
- Odette Sculpture Park
- List of trails in Canada
