= Devonwood Bike Trail =

Bike trail in the southern end of the city of Windsor, Ontario, Canada

Coordinates: 42.292548°N 82.982483°W

Devonwood Bike Trail Walker Homesite Trail Devon Trail Devon Neighbourhood Trail
- Length: 2.1 km (1.3 mi)
- Location: Devon, Devonshire, Devonshire Mall, Windsor Airport
- Trailheads: Conservation Drive and South Service Road; Devonwood Conservation Area

The Devonwood Bike Trail is a fairly straight and flat bike trail in the southern end of the city of Windsor, Ontario. The path starts just south of E.C. Row Expressway at the intersection of Hallmark Avenue and Conservation Drive. The path has several short branches less than 100 m long to connect it to neighbouring cul-de-sacs, and passes through a couple parks. Its southern terminus is the end of the pavement as it enters the Essex Region Conservation Authority-controlled Devonwood Conservation Area, a heavily wooded animal and plant sanctuary. The trail also serves the Windsor Airport, Devonshire Mall, and the "Silver City" mall and theatre area via bike lanes on Calderwood Avenue and a paved trail along Walker Road.

Contrary to what one may expect, the trail is actually quite lightly travelled, considering the major attractions within 1 mile (1.6 km) of it.

== Extensions ==
Since Trans-Canada Trail signs have been posted along the western half of the Riverfront Bike Trail (and since the Grand Marais Trail has been completed, along with bike lanes and signs along Parent Avenue being erected), it is speculated that this trail may provide a connecting link between the Riverfront Trail and the Chrysler Canada Greenway, which runs from South Talbot Road to the official starting point, 1.1 km south, at Highway 3 and Oldcastle Road, in Oldcastle, and travels via Harrow and Kingsville to Ruthven and Leamington. One main obstacle is the Devonwood Conservation Area, which has several sharp curves, poor visibility at times, and is a protected nature preserve.

=== Windsor Loop ===
The City of Windsor has expressed intentions on creating a bike trail, bike lane, and signed-route/Bike-Friendly Street "beltway" around Windsor, using pre-existing routes, lanes, and trails, and adding new ones to streets. The trail would use the Riverfront Bike Trail and Ganatchio Trail to the north, the West Windsor Recreationway to the west, a new alignment following Cabana Road to the Devonwood Conservation Area. The Loop would also follow the current Devonwood Bike Trail, following along North Service Road and E.C. Row Expressway to the subdivision of Forest Glade, where it would turn north on Lauzon Road (not Lauzon Parkway), and follow the current signed route and path along Hawthorne Drive (a residential street), to the Little River Extension, before meeting back up with the Ganatchio Trail at the roundabout/traffic circle. This route has not been completed yet, but several segments are already in place. The loop has a couple crossings at E.C. Row interchanges, which are extremely busy, and could pose a potential safety hazard to cyclists. The city hopes to finish the Loop "within the next 20 years".

== See also ==
- Bike Trails in the City of Windsor
- Ganatchio Trail
- Little River Extension
- Riverside Drive Vista Project
- Russell Street Neighbourhood Trail
- Trans-Canada Trail
