= Little River Extension =

Recreational trail in Ontario, Canada

Coordinates: 42.3230°N 82.9244°W

Ganatchio Trail-Little River Extension Little River Bike Trail Little River Parkway
- Location: Riverside, Villages of Riverside, Little River, Forest Glade
- Trailheads: Roundabout/traffic circle with Ganatchio Trail in Windsor, Ontario; Via Rail/CN Rail tracks (continues as Penang Lane)

The Little River Extension (full name: Ganatchio Trail – Little River Extension) is one of the newest and busiest recreational trails in Windsor, Ontario, Canada, having been built in 1996. The trail is used mainly as a link between the large subdivision of Forest Glade, to Ganatchio Trail, Sandpoint Beach, Stop 26 Beach, and Lakeview Park And Marina. The trail has a posted speed limit of 20 kilometres per hour (12 mph).

The Trail was sponsored by Lions Club International, Kiwanis, and Rotary International, as a gesture of goodwill for the eastern side of the city. The trail sees a great deal of traffic in the summer time, but nowhere near as much as the Riverfront Bike Trail. The trail has a commemorative sign depicting its length, map location, and a sign for the Lions Club International and Rotary International at the northern roundabout/traffic circle with the Ganatchio Trail.

The trail also has a second roundabout/traffic circle with the extension of Little River Road, which leads west towards the Riverside and Villages of Riverside neighbourhoods.

== Connections with other trails ==
Currently, the Little River Extension connects to the Ganatchio Trail to the north, and to the Little River Road Trail and Bike Lanes to the west (where they intersect at another traffic circle). The trail crosses an extended Wyandotte Street, with its own bike lanes, at a grade-separated interchange, and a link to the bike trail along McHugh Street extension is under way.

The trail ends at the end of Penang Lane (a very quiet residential street), and the busy Tecumseh Road. The trail travels west along the north side of Tecumseh Road to the newly installed traffic signals at the Windsor Smart Car dealership, and then along the western edge of the dealership, towards Esplanade Drive (a residential street). The trail then passes two grade schools (with small paved trails connecting each to the trail), and through the small forest between the schools and Ridge Road (another residential street), before terminating just east of the intersection of Ridge and Kerby Road (one more residential street). On the other side of the Smart Car dealership traffic lights, the trail proceeds west to the Little River-Hawthorne Drive connector trail, and links east towards Forest Glade Drive, to the proposed bike lanes along that arterial road.

=== Spurs ===
The trail has a couple of spurs, each of which are only two lanes wide (for bicycles), compared to the Little River Extension (LRE)'s four lanes. One branches north-west and heads towards Bertha Avenue, with a second linking the LRE to the Bertha Avenue Spur to act as a short-cut, being only a few hundred meters in length.

The other trail ("Little River Trail") acts as a loop over the top of the Little River Hill, and back towards the roundabout/traffic circle at the parking lot/park and ride intersection at Little River Road (and its Bike Lanes), travelling west towards the Villages of Riverside and Riverside neighbourhoods, across Little River creek.

The trail has an unofficial "Extension" along Tecumseh Road to the Hawthorne Drive Trail, which travels along the western bank of Little River, down along Hawthorne Drive, to Lauzon Parkway.

== A new link ==
On December 11, 2006, the City of Windsor officially opened the so-called "Bridge to Nowhere" providing a second link along Wyandotte Street to the new subdivision being built on the East End. The road is two lanes wide with bike lanes, and a bike trail on one end. A spur from the Little River Extension linking the LRE to Bertha Street was re-aligned slightly to cross the road and meet the trail. The Wyandotte Street trail leads west to the LRE, where a proposed intersection is planned.

In early 2007, Wyandotte Street was extended east to Florence Avenue, but this posed a problem, as the street would cross the LRE, which is a very busy trail. The City of Windsor's engineers came up with a solution, and made a tunnel under the road for the bike trail, for unimpeded traffic flow with ramps connecting the trail to the sidewalks and street above. The trail was also re-aligned slightly at the roundabout/traffic circle with the Ganatchio Trail, with the addition of a four-lane ramp linking it to the Ganatchio Trail (to help minimize weaving and lower traffic at the roundabout, by giving people a second option at which to turn).

The trail was also extended south in early 2007, by heading west along Tecumseh Road to the new traffic lights at the Smart Car dealership in Windsor. It then continues west before turning south along a newly constructed trail along the east bank of Little River. This extension continues southward, crossing Esplanade Drive (a residential street) and through the Forest Glade forest (for which the neighbourhood is named) near two elementary schools, before terminating at Ridge Road (another residential street). The trail is also connected to the newly built Hawthorne Road Bike Trail via a bridge at Tecumseh Road, (the Hawthorne Road Bike Trail along the west bank of Little River was constructed in 2003). This trail ultimately leads to Roseville Gardens and ultimately Fountain Bleu. In 2008, McNorton Street was extended across Little River to the new Windsor Family Credit Union Arena, temporarily cutting the trail in two, though this will be remedied in the future with an underpass similar to Wyandotte Street. Also in 2008, powerful storms swept across the region from June 3 to June 8, causing the Wyandotte Street Tunnel of the trail to flood with water.

== Talks of expansion ==
As of 2006, Windsor City Council has been in talks with CN Rail and Hiram Walker Distillery on buying a spur line, and converting the railroad tracks into a rail trail, for easy connection to the Riverfront Bike Trail in Downtown and the west end. This is boosted by the fact that the Via Rail train station downtown ("Windsor-Walkerville") is old and over-crowded. The City has several plans in the event of a relocation of railways:

- Via trains would be re-routed to use the tracks near the Windsor Airport, placing them on the same rails that the Amtrak trains use, possibly allowing for quicker Chicago-Toronto passenger service (instead of via Sarnia, Ontario)
- Hiram Walker Distillery would be provided compensation for the loss of railway, in an unspecified manner. The tracks would be torn up in favour of a road or long park and cycleway, making the city much safer, as many people have died in fatal automobile-train and pedestrian-train accidents.
- The trains would use the same tracks (towards the Michigan Central Railway Tunnel into Detroit), which is viable given the DRTP proposal for turning the tunnel into a two-lane truck tunnel appears to be (nearly) dead.
- Until the railway can be bought (and/or if the deal fails), the bike lanes along Wyandotte Street East would be extended to St. Rose Avenue, where they would meet the Ganatchio Trail, and ultimately, along its entire length to Mill Street on the west end in the Sandwich neighbourhood.

== See also ==
- City of Windsor's Parks and Bike Trails
- Grand Marais Trail
- Ganatchio Trail
- Russell Street Neighbourhood Trail
- Devonwood Bike Trail
- Riverside Drive Vista Project
- Trans-Canada Trail
