= Black Oak Heritage Park =

Park in Ontario, Canada

- IUCN category II (national park)
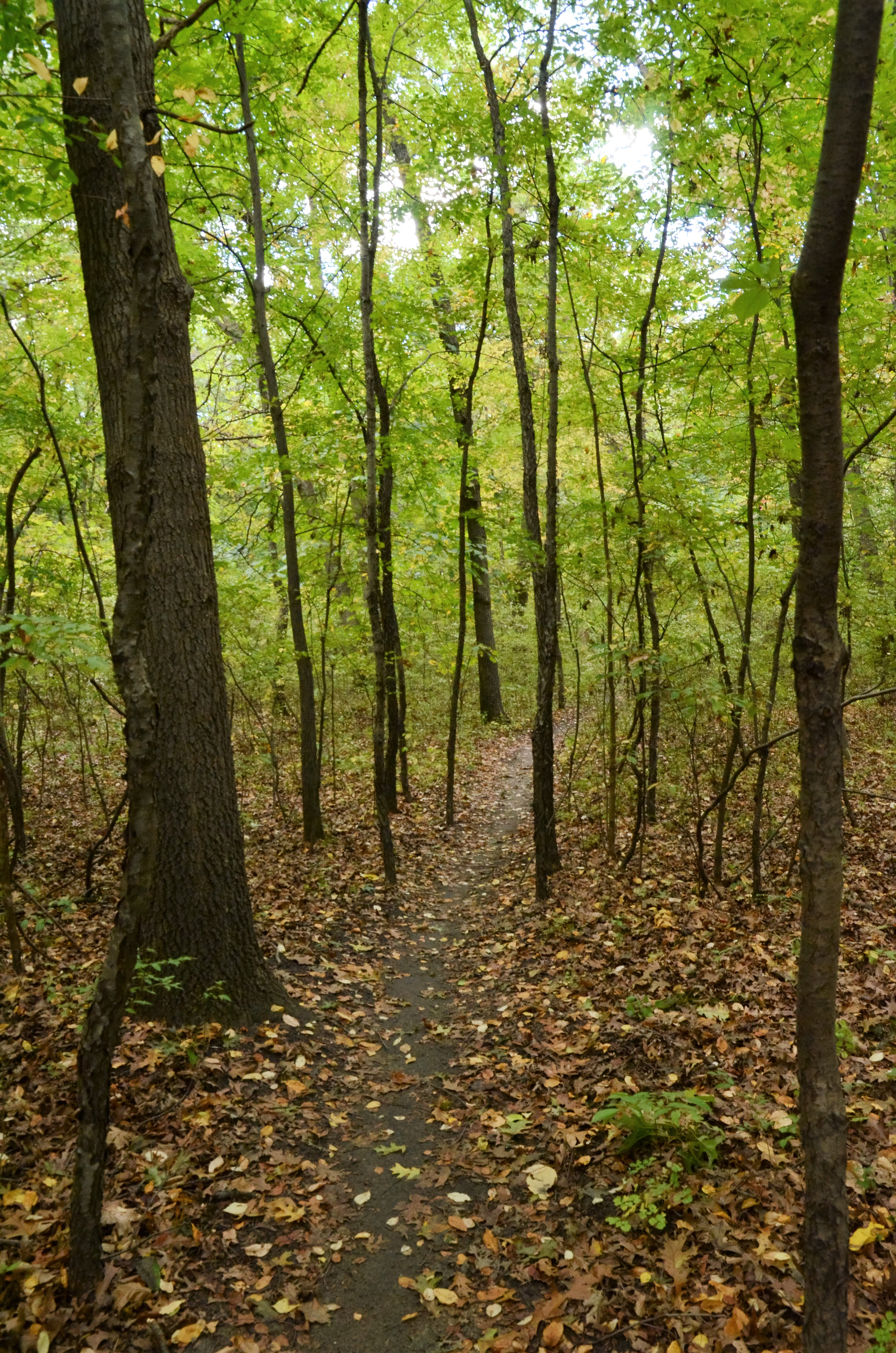
- A trail through the forest of Black Oak Heritage Park

- Location within Ontario
- Location: Southwestern Ontario, Canada
- Nearest city: Windsor, Ontario
- Coordinates: 42°16′05″N 83°05′20″W
- Area: 100 ha (250 acres)
- Established: 1989
- Governing body: Essex Region Conservation Authority

Black Oak Heritage Park is a park in Essex County, Ontario, Canada, located along the boundary between Windsor and LaSalle.

== History ==
1950-1970 - The Land was frequented by local hikers and was called Yawkey Bush.

1989 - Land was acquired by the City of Windsor from the Canadian Salt Company. Portions of the land with the most significant stand of trees was turned into Black Oak Heritage Park

2005-2015 - Entrances on the north and east side of the park are guarded by 24/7 Security teams. It's unclear why the security were posted, but its assumed they were posted on behalf of the Windsor Port Authority to prevent dumping until the adjacent north woodlot could be cleared to make way for the Gordie Howe International Bridge. Security teams were no longer present beginning in April 2015.

2014-2015 - Woodlot directly north of the park was cleared to make way for a new international bridge crossing. This area was once the Brighton Beach community. The clearing of the north part of the park has affected the local deer population and has exposed the north part of the park to more industrial pollution as there is no longer a buffer zone.

== Human impact ==
The park was once corn fields from indigenous peoples. It was once a rail yard with heavy use by the Canadian Salt Company. It was used by motocross and off roading trucks and cars for a time
