= Russell Street Neighbourhood Trail =

Russell Street Neighbourhood Trail Russell Street Recreationway Russell Street Trail Sandwich Trail
- Length: 2.2 km (1.4 mi)
- Location: University/Sandwich Town
- Trailheads: Intersection with Peter Street and Brock Street; Intersection of Chewett Street and Riverside Drive (Chewett Park/Chewett Beach)
- Use: Bicycling

The Russell Street Neighbourhood Trail is a short bike trail that travels through the historic Sandwich Town neighbourhood in western Windsor, Ontario. The trail passes by the Mill Street Dock, Chewett Beach / Chewett Park, and passes by Mackenzie Hall, one of the oldest buildings in Windsor (built from 1855 to 1856). Kennith

== Extensions ==
Recently, the City of Windsor's Department of Recreation has announced that there will be a widening of Riverside Drive's sidewalk into a full bike trail, connecting it to the Russell Street Neighbourhood Trail, as it would cost money to expropriate a few houses and a former nursing home (now a Dormitory for students at the University of Windsor) situated along the riverfront. The Ambassador Bridge was originally thought to be a barrier, but this has also been announced as a non-issue, since the sidewalk along Riverside Drive will simply be widened to accommodate an extension to link the two trails. No timetable for construction and completion has been set, however, but could be expected within 5–10 years.

The City of Windsor's Parks and Recreation department has rectified the gap between the Riverfront Trail and Sandwich Towne and the Russell Street Neighbourhood Trail, by extending bicycle lanes along University Avenue and Sandwich Street, all the way to Prince Road.

== See also ==
- Grand Marais Trail
- Ganatchio Trail
- Little River Extension
- Devonwood Bike Trail
- Riverside Drive Vista Project
- Bike Trails in the City of Windsor
- Trans-Canada Trail
- List of trails in Canada
