= Grand Marais Trail =

Bicycle trail in Windsor, Ontario

Coordinates: 42.290231°N 82.987547°W

Grand Marais Trail Grand Marais Bike Trail Turkey Creek Trail
- Length: 8.0 km (5.0 mi)
- Location: Sandwich, Walkerville
- Trailheads: West Windsor Recreationway in Windsor, Ontario; Central Avenue and Grand Marais Road in Windsor, Ontario

The Grand Marais Trail is a small bicycle trail that follows Turkey Creek (also known as the Grand Marais Drain) in the middle of Windsor, Ontario. It starts off as a minor spur route, connecting the West Windsor Recreationway with Huron Church Road and the neighbourhood of South Windsor (via a tunnel under Huron Church Road, and light at Grand Marais Rd. if the tunnel is closed).

== Routing and path description ==
The trail begins as a link to the West Windsor Recreationway, and travels along Grand Marais Road, with a spur branch heading south and under Huron Church Road. The trail continues along its own alignment before leading to bike lanes at West Grand Boulevard. The original path only travelled as far as Balmoral Avenue and California Avenue (both residential streets) until very recently, having been constructed as either a gravel or concrete-paved trail.

Bike lanes continue along both sides of Turkey Creek (Grand Marais Road West, and West Grand Boulevard), with a trail bypass heading along Academy Drive and Radisson Court West, before becoming its own trail between houses and Turkey Creek. The trail's three branches all meet up at Bruce Avenue (which is the main thoroughfare for vehicular traffic as well as cycling traffic heading to and from Grand Marais Road), where the routing continues along West Grand Boulevard. In between the three alignments, a bridge connects the Grand Marais Road bike lanes to the "bypass" (along Academy Drive) and to West Grand Blvd.'s bike lanes at Virginia Park Avenue.

The trail continues as a separated path again from intersection of West Grand Boulevard and South Cameron Boulevard on the north side of the road to intersection with Howard Avenue. As it crosses two tracks of the CASO Subdivision CN Rail line at-grade, it continues due north along the west side of Howard Avenue, serving Devonshire Mall and Roundhouse Centre. The path then crosses the Roundhouse Centre/Devonshire Mall plaza entrances and switches to the east side of Howard Avenue, heading due north.

The path then crosses the northbound-to-eastbound onramp to E.C. Row Expressway, which currently presents a dangerous situation (high-speed cars and transport trucks driving by without a safe crossing light for pedestrians or cyclists). After this onramp, the path travels underneath E.C. Row Expressway, meeting the already-open stretch of trail just north of the traffic lights serving the westbound offramp.

Between Grand Marais Road East and the E.C. Row ramp intersection, the trail heads northeast, with a spur joining it from the intersection of Grand Marais Road. The trail leads north-east, while a second branch continues due north before terminating at Remington Avenue.

The main trail heads between Turkey Creek and a few industrial offices. All trail sections and branches are a minimum of four lanes wide (enough width for four bikes to ride side-by-side).

The road crosses Elsmere Avenue and Langois Avenue before having a spur branch off to link the trail to Brookview Crescent (and a small playground at the corner of Brookview Cres. as it curves).

Langois Avenue and Parent then lead towards the Remington Booster Park and its trail system, and eventually, towards bike lanes on Parent Avenue, with the final end at Riverside Drive and the Riverfront Bike Trail.

The next spur heads due south to meet Conservation Drive (which indirectly links the trail to the Devonwood Trail).

As the trail passes the Fogolar Furlan club, it splits into two alignments: one curves to the south to meet Parkdale Place, while the main route heads north to meet Turner Road. A "temporary crossing for pedestrians and cyclists" (as said by the City of Windsor) exists between Grand Marais Road and Memorial Drive, at the intersections of the discontinuous segments of Turner Road, to allow pedestrians to access shops while Walker Road is re-built below the CP Rail line. The current trail (temporary or not) meets the single CP line at-grade, with crossing signals. At Memorial Drive, the trail then meets Walker Road at the Grand Marais intersection, and heads west towards Memorial Park, meeting the trail network in that park.

East of Walker Road, the trail continues in several discontinuous segments, though these are expected to be linked together as one long trail serving the Chrysler Minivan Plant. The trail resumes at the south side of the intersection of Chrysler Centre Drive (formerly the southern extension of Drouillard Road) and Grand Marais Road East, continuing until Meldrum Road.

== Development of the trail ==
Much of the Grand Marais Trail can be considered the newest bike trail of the network, as most of the trail has been recently constructed (in 2006, with ongoing extensions currently under construction) along Turkey Creek, around 650 feet (200 m) south of Grand Marais Road, bypassing this very busy, dangerous and heavily-travelled two-lane road (by bikes and cars). The path extends from an intersection with Turner Road, along the creek, with a short (30-ft /10 m) cut-off to Byng Road (a residential street), with a cut-off to Parkdale Place near the Fogolar Furlan club and park, westerly with offshoot trails leading a short distance to nearby streets in the Remington Park subdivision, leading to Conservation Street, which also links to the Devonwood Bike Trail on the other side of E.C. Row Expressway. The road has a major junction with Langois Avenue, as it provides one of two links to the Bike Route along Parent Avenue (and ultimately, Riverfront Trail and Ganatchio Trail), via a short jog on Grand Marais Road. The second is at Ellsmere Avenue. The trail continues west between industrial lots, and the creek, before meeting Howard Avenue and Grand Marais Road, with three branching paths: One north to Remington Street, one straight to the intersection, and one curving south to the E.C. Row/Howard Avenue Interchange, where it will eventually meet up with another extension of the current path under construction to improve access via bike and walking to the Devonshire Mall. The extension has been paved, but it is not open yet, however, and the freeway ramp from Howard Avenue (northbound) to E.C. Row Expressway (eastbound) represents a considerable obstacle, and a safety hazard for pedestrians, cyclists, and automobiles, and is quite busy. It may be possible to link the Devonwood Bike Trail (east of the mall) to the mall from the rear, where traffic is far lighter.

== See also ==
- Ganatchio Trail
- Little River Extension
- Russell Street Neighbourhood Trail
- Devonwood Bike Trail
- Riverside Drive Vista Project
- Bike Trails in the City of Windsor
- Trans-Canada Trail
