= Colasanti's Tropical Gardens =

Gardens and entertainment and shopping centre in Kingsville, Ontario, Canada

Coordinates: 42.06324°N 82.67647°W

Colasanti's Tropical Gardens is an indoor entertainment and shopping centre, situated in the community of Ruthven, part of Kingsville, Ontario. The tropical gardens are housed in 15 temperature-controlled greenhouses and feature exotic birds (Macaw, Cockatoo, Amazon parrot), home grown tropical plants, animal area, an 18-hole mini golf course, home decor shopping, and a restaurant.

== History ==
Colasanti's started producing vegetables and greenhouse crops in 1941, they also had a small fruit stand. In 1955 their greenhouses began growing lemon and orange trees.

In 1972 cactus and tropical plants were added to Colasanti's production. Today, Colasanti's has a wide variety of indoor and seasonal plants. It has expanded into a local family entertainment centre and tourist attraction.

It is currently a fourth generation family owned and operated business.

In 2005 the World Society for the Protection of Animals (Now known as World Animal Protection) inspected the animal attractions at Colasanti's. Of the five enclosures that were reviewed, Colasanti's Tropical Gardens received five failing grades with an average score of 18 out of 50 making it one of the five worst reviewed "zoos" in Ontario.

== Events ==
Colasanti's is home to the Ruthven Apple Festival, an annual fundraising event for the Windsor and Essex County Community Living Organization.

Other popular events at Colasanti's include Family Day and March Break Madness. They frequently post on their social media about upcoming events, craft days, and activities in their facility.
