= Riverside Drive (Windsor, Ontario) =

- The Drive, Riverside
- Length: 17.5 km (10.9 mi)
- Location: Neighbourhoods: University, Bridgeview, West Side, Downtown, Walkerville, Ontario, Pilette Village, Riverside, Villages of Riverside, Little River, Greenway, Tecumseh, St. Clair Beach, Ontario
- West end: Huron Church Road/Sandwich Street Windsor, Ontario
- East end: Tecumseh, Ontario town limits

Construction
- Inauguration: = 1892

Riverside Drive is one of the main roads in Windsor, Ontario, Canada, travelling along the Detroit River, between its riverfront parks and high-rise office towers and apartment buildings. The road travels through Downtown, and towards the east end. The road is roughly 17.5 km in length, and is quite busy.

The road continues as Riverside Drive through the town of Tecumseh, Ontario, and through the village of St. Clair Beach, Ontario, where it ends at Brighton Road (Essex County Road 21).

For around 3 km of its length (from Rankin Avenue to Crawford Avenue (in front of CBC Windsor), there are bike lanes, with the Riverfront Bike Trail just to the north in the parkland. Much of Windsor's most expensive residential real estate is housed on the waterfront side of Riverside Drive.

== Sandwich Street ==
Sandwich Street
- Length: 5 km (3.1 mi)
- Location: Neighbourhoods: Sandwich, University
- North end: Huron Church Road/Riverside Drive
- South end: Broadway Street in the Brighton Beach neighbourhood

Construction
- Inauguration: =1892

The road was once named Sandwich Street, for the former community and now neighbourhood on the west end of Windsor. The road continues as Sandwich Street from the intersection with University Ave. West just past Huron Church Road, and continues past Ojibway Parkway to the Brighton Beach Power Plant, Black Oak Heritage Park, and the Brighton Beach neighbourhood of Windsor.

== Riverside Drive Vista Project ==
Throughout late 2005, and all of 2006, Windsor City Council has been trying to convert and widen the sidewalk along Riverside Drive (from Strabane Avenue to roughly Lauzon Road), to improve cycling access from the west side and downtown to the east side. The road is currently two lanes for most of its length, having either bike lanes or upscale residential properties that extend from the riverfront to the roadway.

The vista project will be a multimillion-dollar beautification project to plant trees, re-surface Riverside Drive, and re-surface sidewalks, possibly installing either bike lanes, or a bike trail along the road.

Residents who reside on the eastern portion of Riverside Drive are angry that the road is treated like a two-lane freeway, with drivers speeding well above the posted speed limit of 50 km/h, and are calling for the City of Windsor to honour the promise made to them ten years ago to improve other roadways and divert the commuter traffic from their residential area.

== See also ==
- Ganatchio Trail
- Little River Extension
- Devonwood Bike Trail
- Riverside Drive Vista Project
- Bike Trails in the City of Windsor
- Trans-Canada Trail
