= Ganatchio Trail =

Bike trail in Ontario, Canada

Coordinates: 42.340783°N 82.927723°W

Ganatchio Trail The Ganatchio
- Length: 5.3 km (3.3 mi)
- Location: Riverside, Villages of Riverside, Little River, Greenway, Tecumseh
- Trailheads: Vernon Crescent and Wyandotte street in Windsor, Ontario; Tecumseh, Ontario town limits

The Ganatchio Trail is the second bike trail built in Windsor, Ontario, Canada. Construction on the trail started upon the closure of Clairview Avenue. The trail extends over 5.3 km, and passes through several neighbourhoods, including Riverside and Little River, and serves Sandpoint Beach and Stop 26 Beach and Park. It was the second major trail constructed, after the Riverfront Bike Trail, with extensions east towards Tecumseh built in stages. The trail has a posted speed limit of 20 km/h. The Riverfront and the Ganatchio Trails are wide enough for two cycle lanes in each direction.

The Ganatchio Trail and Little River Extension see a great deal of traffic in the summer, but nowhere near as much as the Riverfront Bike Trail. The Ganatchio Trail has commemorative signs all along it, and a special roundabout/traffic circle where the Ganatchio intersects with the Little River Extension, with a sign depicting its length, map location, and a sign for the Lions Club International and Rotary International, which funded the trail's construction in 1996.

The Ganatchio Trail was built in 1971, incorporating much of Clairview Street, a narrow and rarely used residential street, into its route. The road was sealed off at some parts, and rerouted or truncated at other intersecting streets. The trail runs along Clairview in parts that were left intact, but many intersecting streets, such as Watson Avenue, were closed off, allowing only pedestrians and cyclists to go through. Clairview Avenue was also a boulevard from Watson to Genevieve Avenue. Its second carriageway was transformed into the bike trail, and a few parts were converted entirely into greenways with the trail. Clairview Street (with the Ganatchio Trail) also serves the Riverside Sportsman's Club (a fraternity similar to Lions Club International and Rotary International, which funded the construction of the bike trail with the RSC). The remainder of the trail (from Riverview Road to Tecumseh, and including its bridge over Little River) was built in 1979 and rehabilitated/upgraded in 1983.

The trail's name comes from the Native American/First Nations name for Lake St. Clair.

== Upgrades ==
In May 2007, part of the Ganatchio Trail was relocated to travel just south of a parking lot at Sandpoint Beach. The trail then continues due west with a spur heading straight to meet the Little River Extension, while the main trail branches north again, towards the roundabout with the Little River Extension.

The Little River Extension trail, headed south, now runs through a tunnel under Wyandotte Street that was built in late 2007. The tunnel is well lit, but has the tendency to flood when it rains. A few more minor shifts in the trail have taken place between this bridge and Suicide Hill as well.

== Expansion suggestions ==
In 2006 Windsor City Council was in talks with CN Rail and Hiram Walker Distillery on buying a spur line and converting the railroad tracks into a rail trail, for easy connection to the Riverfront Bike Trail in Downtown and the west end. This is boosted by the fact that the Via Rail train station downtown ("Windsor-Walkerville") is old and over-crowded. The city had several plans in the event of a relocation of railways:

- Via trains would be rerouted to use the tracks near the Windsor Airport, placing them on the same rails that the Amtrak trains use, possibly allowing for quicker Chicago-Toronto passenger service (instead of via Sarnia). The trains would use the same tracks (towards the Michigan Central Railway Tunnel into Detroit), which is very probable, given the DRTP proposal for turning the tunnel into a two-lane truck tunnel is nearly dead.
- Hiram Walker Distillery would be provided compensation for the loss of railway, in an unspecified manner. The tracks would be torn up in favour of a road or long park and cycleway, making the city much safer, as many people have died in fatal automobile-train accidents.
- Until the railway can be bought (and if the deal fails), the bike lanes along Wyandotte Street East would be extended to St. Rose Avenue, where they would meet the Ganatchio Trail. As a part of the Riverside Vista Project, the Little River bridge may receive a twinned span, as the current bridge can only accommodate two lanes of traffic (one east, one west), resulting in a dangerous bottleneck, and many times, it can only fit one bike across, due to pedestrians looking over the side of the bridge, or of fishermen on it.

=== Windsor Loop ===
The City of Windsor expressed intentions of creating a bike trail, bike lane, and signed-route/Bike-Friendly Street "beltway" around Windsor, using pre-existing routes, lanes, and trails, and adding new ones to streets. The trail would use the Riverfront Bike Trail and Ganatchio Trail to the north, the West Windsor Recreationway to the west, and a new alignment following Cabana Road to the Devonwood Conservation Area. The Loop would also follow the current Devonwood Bike Trail, following along North Service Road and E.C. Row Expressway to the subdivision of Forest Glade, where it would turn north on Lauzon Road (not Lauzon Parkway), and follow the current signed route and path along Hawthorne Drive (a residential street), to the Little River Extension, before meeting back up with the Ganatchio Trail at the roundabout/traffic circle. Several segments are already in place. The loop has a couple of crossings at E.C. Row interchanges, which are extremely busy, and could pose a potential safety hazard to cyclists. The city hoped to finish the Loop "within the next 20 years".

== See also ==
- Grand Marais Trail
- Riverfront Bike Trail
- Little River Extension
- Russell Street Neighbourhood Trail
- Devonwood Bike Trail
- Bike Trails in the City of Windsor
- Trans-Canada Trail
