= LaSalle, Ontario =

Town in Ontario, Canada

LaSalle
- Town (lower-tier)
- Town of LaSalle
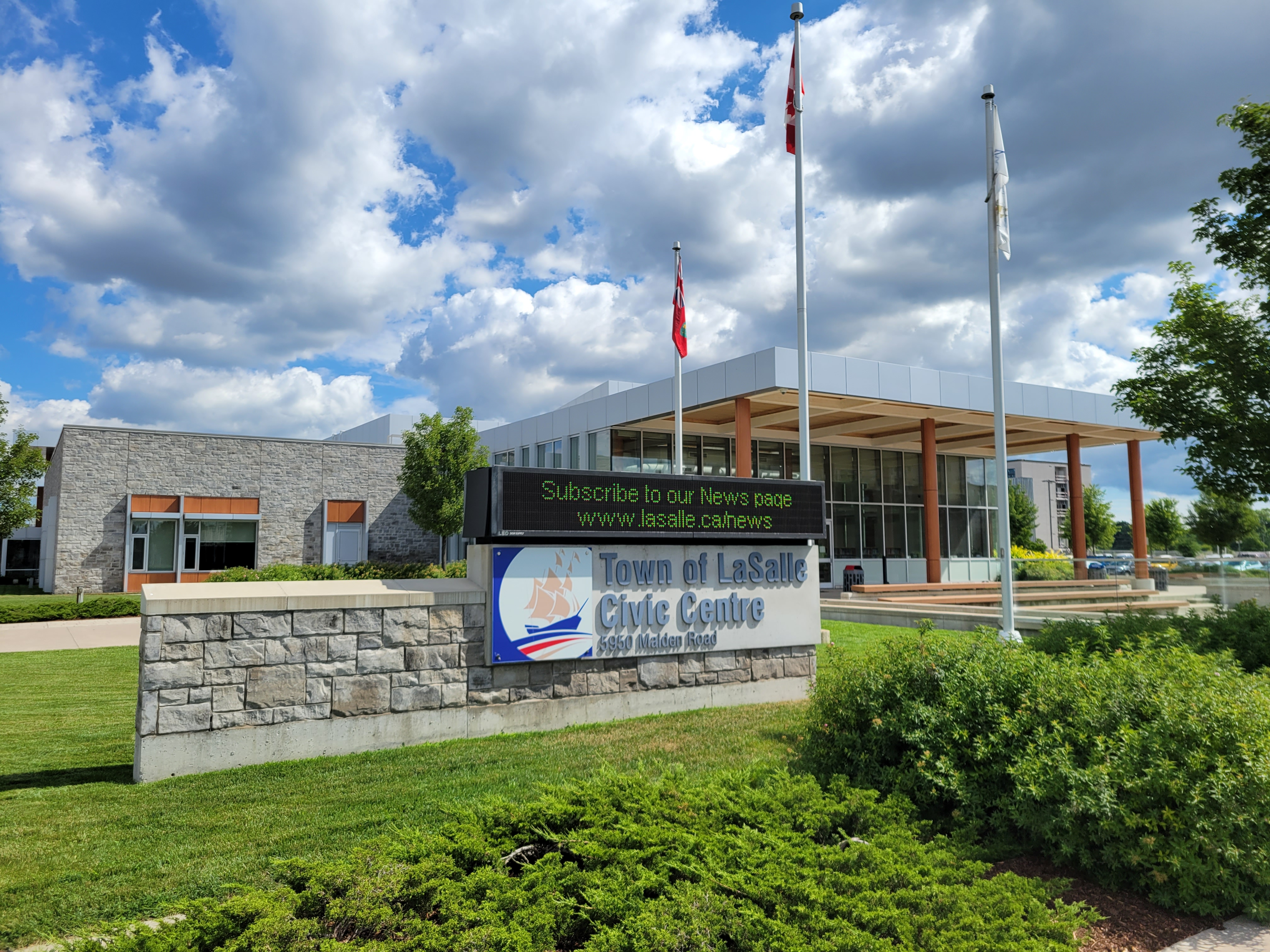

- Flag Coat of arms

- Location within Essex County Location within Southern Ontario
- Coordinates: 42°13′N 83°04′W
- Country: Canada
- Province: Ontario
- County: Essex
- Incorporated: 1991

Government
  - Mayor: Crystal Meloche
  - Member of Parliament: Chris Lewis (CPC)
  - Provincial Representative: Anthony Leardi (PC)

Area
  - Land: 65.35 km^{2} (25.23 sq mi)

Population (2021)
  - Total: 32,721
  - Density: 500.7/km^{2} (1,297/sq mi)
- Time zone: UTC−05:00 (EST)
  - Summer (DST): UTC−04:00 (EDT)
- Forward sortation area: N9H to N9J
- Area codes: 519, 226, and 548
- Website: www.lasalle.ca

LaSalle is a town in Essex County, Ontario, Canada. It is a bedroom community of the City of Windsor, part of the Windsor Census Metropolitan Area, and located south of that city. LaSalle, along with Windsor, is the oldest French settlement area in Southwestern Ontario and the oldest continually-inhabited European settlement in Canada west of the Quebec border. The town was named for explorer René-Robert Cavelier, Sieur de La Salle.

The current Town of Lasalle was originally organized as the Township of Sandwich West in 1861 when Sandwich Township was divided into two parts. A portion of the township incorporated as the Town of Lasalle in 1924, but was dissolved in 1959 and rejoined Sandwich West. In 1991, the Township changed its status to that of a town and was renamed Lasalle. It is the second most populous municipality within Essex County, after the Municipality of Lakeshore. The town's land area includes Fighting Island in the Detroit River on its western side. Fighting Island is privately owned by BASF, the world's largest chemical company.

== Town features ==
One of LaSalle's biggest events is the annual Strawberry Festival which takes place on the first weekend in June. The annual LaSalle Craft Beer Festival, put on by the Corporation of the Town of LaSalle, is another annual event that features different types of beer, from popular brands to smaller microbreweries.

LaSalle also has a bicycle trail network called the LaSalle Trail, which links up to neighbouring Windsor Trail network, allowing people to ride from Sandwich Secondary School to Windsor's Riverfront Trail. The town has expressed intention to connect LaSalle (and indirectly, Windsor) to the Chrysler Canada Greenway by constructing a link to the Trans Canada Trail near Oldcastle.

LaSalle's Brunet Park has a 2.6 km loop trail and is generally considered an easy route, which takes an average of 28 minutes to complete. With 40 km of paved trails in LaSalle, you can walk, jog or ride your bicycle throughout the town. There are 16 signs along the trails, with facts about LaSalle, Ontario and/or Canada.

The town also features the Vollmer Culture and Recreation Complex, home to the LaSalle Vipers, of the GOJHL and the LaSalle Sabres, of the OMHA. It is also home to the LaSalle Stompers, of the Ontario Soccer Association. The complex has multiple rooms for hosting of events, 2 arenas, an Olympic-sized pool and slide, outdoor skate park, splash pad, soccer fields, and baseball diamonds.

== Education ==
The secular Anglophone school district is Greater Essex County District School Board. The Catholic Anglophone school district is Windsor-Essex Catholic District School Board.

LaSalle has two secondary schools: Sandwich Secondary School and St. Thomas of Villanova Catholic Secondary School. Elementary schools include Sacred Heart Elementary School, Legacy Oak Trail Public School, LaSalle Public School, Sandwich West Public School, École Monseigneur Augustin Caron, and Holy Cross Catholic Elementary School.

The area Secular Francophone school district is Conseil scolaire Viamonde. The zoned elementary school in that sector is École élémentaire Louise-Charron, and the zoned secondary school is École secondaire de Lamothe-Cadillac (formerly École secondaire Michel-Gratton).

The area Catholic Francophone school district is Conseil scolaire catholique Providence.

== LaSalle Landing ==
LaSalle is currently revitalizing its waterfront with an initiative called the LaSalle Landing. The project will include an event centre, a retention pond, sport zone, water fountain, skate trail, boat launch and multiple new bridges. This project is projected to cost 48.5 million dollars. LaSalle will be using $4,500,000 from the Federal Gas Tax and $500 000 from the Pedestrian Safety Reserve to help pay for the project. LaSalle has taken on $12,000,000 of debt after being denied a grant through the Investing in Canada Infrastructure Program.

== Communities ==
Besides the urban area proper of LaSalle itself, the town comprises a number of villages and hamlets, including Delisle's Corners, Heritage Estates, Lukerville, Oliver and River Canard.

== Demographics ==
Historical populations
Year	Pop.	±%
1991	16,628	—
1996	20,566	+23.7%
2001	25,285	+22.9%
2006	27,652	+9.4%
2011	28,643	+3.6%
2016	30,180	+5.4%
2021	32,721	+8.4%

In the 2021 Census of Population conducted by Statistics Canada, LaSalle had a population of 32,721 living in 11,644 of its 11,922 total private dwellings, a change of 8.4% from its 2016 population of 30,180. With a land area of 64.96 km^{2} (25.08 sq mi), it had a population density of 503.7/km^{2} (1,304.6/sq mi) in 2021.

Canada census – LaSalle community profile

	2021	2016	2011
Population	32,721 (+8.4% from 2016)	30,180 (5.4% from 2011)	28,643 (3.6% from 2006)
Land area	64.96 km^{2} (25.08 sq mi)	65.35 km^{2} (25.23 sq mi)	65.30 km^{2} (25.21 sq mi)
Population density	503.7/km^{2} (1,305/sq mi)	461.8/km^{2} (1,196/sq mi)	438.6/km^{2} (1,136/sq mi)
Median age	44.0 (M: 42.8, F: 44.8)		40.5 (M: 40.0, F: 41.0)
Private dwellings	11,922 (total) 11,644 (occupied)	10,793 (total)	10,103 (total)
Median household income	$119,000

References: 2021 2016 2011

== Notable people ==
- Jeff Burrows - member of rock band The Tea Party; grew up in LaSalle
- Stuart Chatwood - member of rock band The Tea Party; grew up in LaSalle
- Pete Craig - former MLB player
- Andy Delmore - former NHL player
- Jesse Divnich - Industry personality in video games; grew up in LaSalle
- David Finch - comic book artist
- Julia Hanes - para-athletics athlete
- Richie Hawtin - electronic musician; grew up in LaSalle
- Zack Kassian - NHL player
- Paul Lucier - Senator
- Jeff Martin - member of rock band The Tea Party; grew up in LaSalle
- Kylie Masse - competitive swimmer; a world champion and a world record holder in the 100 m backstroke; grew up in LaSalle
- Dalton Prout - former NHL player
- Amanda Reason - former world record holder and Olympic swimmer
- Marc Reaume- former NHL player
- Derek Wilkinson - former NHL player
- Luke Willson - former NFL tight end, Super Bowl Champion
- Andrew Gibson - NHL player with the Detroit Red Wings

== See also ==
- List of townships in Ontario
