= Windsor International Airport =

Airport in Ontario, Canada

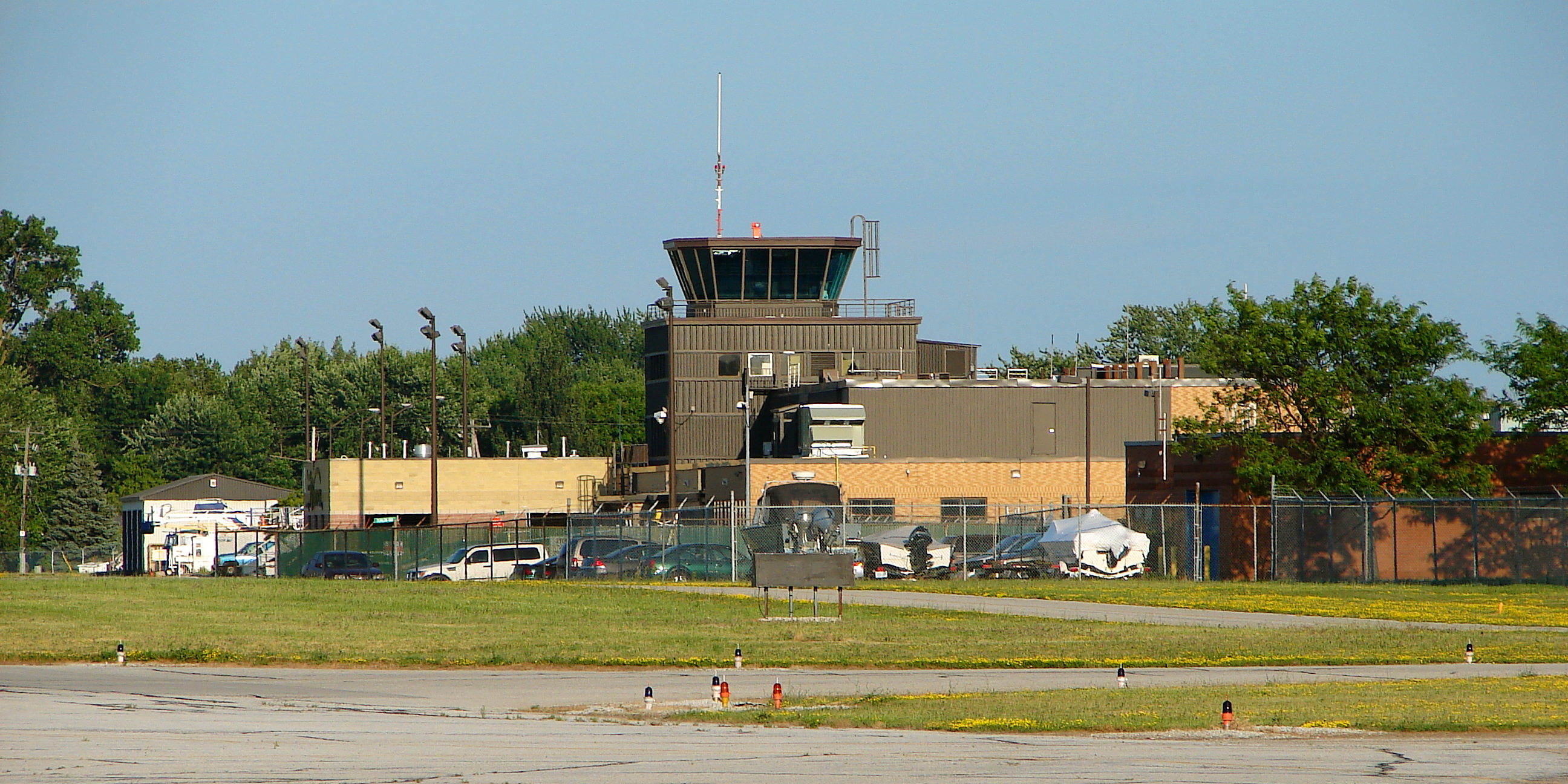
- IATA: YQG; ICAO: CYQG; WMO: 71538

Summary
- Airport type: Public
- Owner: Windsor City Council
- Operator: Your Quick Gateway (Windsor) Inc.
- Serves: Detroit–Windsor
- Time zone: EST (UTC−05:00)
  - Summer (DST): EDT (UTC−04:00)
- Elevation AMSL: 622 ft (190 m)
- Coordinates: 42°16′34″N 082°57′19″W
- Website: www.flyyqg.ca

Map
- Location in Ontario CYQG (Canada)

Runways
Direction	Length		Surface
Direction	ft	m	Surface
07/25	9,000	2,743	Asphalt
12/30	5,150	1,570	Asphalt

Statistics (2018)
- Aircraft movements: 42,700
- Passengers: 330,000
- Source: Canada Flight Supplement; Environment and Climate Change Canada; Movements from Statistics Canada

Windsor International Airport (IATA: YQG, ICAO: CYQG) is located in the southeast portion of the city of Windsor, Ontario, Canada. The airport serves a mixture of scheduled airline flights and general aviation, and is a popular point of entry into Canada for private and business aircraft. The airspace above the airport is exceptionally busy because of the proximity to Detroit Metropolitan Wayne County Airport, and Instrument Flight Rules (IFR) arrivals and departures are handled by Detroit approach control.

The airport is classified as an airport of entry by Nav Canada and is staffed by the Canada Border Services Agency (CBSA). CBSA officers at this airport can handle aircraft up to 325 passengers, and can handle up to 450 if the aircraft is unloaded in stages.

== History ==
The airport opened in 1928 as Walker Airport, named after Hiram Walker, a 19th-century whiskey distiller and distributor of the Canadian Club brand.

In 1967, the airport was added to the national portfolio of Canadian airports, citing its increasing importance as a regional airport hub for Southwestern Ontario, serving the areas between Detroit, Michigan, and London, Ontario, and well expanding beyond its original roots as a mere landing strip.

=== Recent history ===
In 2006, Serco Aviation Services, Inc., announced that they would request early termination of their airport management contract with the City of Windsor, as Windsor Airport had been losing around CAD$40,000 per month. The City of Windsor accepted Serco's withdrawal and prepared to operate the airport itself, but with a large deficit. On July 1, 2007, Serco handed over operations of the airport to the City of Windsor. Windsor City Council had approved of an ad hoc group to run the airport on behalf of the city, named "Your Quick Gateway (Windsor) Inc." (after the airport's ICAO call letters, YQG). This private organization was formed by the Windsor City Council, and was supposed to be a "temporary band-aid solution" until another operator was found. However, on November 14, The Windsor Star reported that since Your Quick Gateway had been so successful in managing the airport, posting a small profit in the process, it would be given permission to operate the facility indefinitely in this manner.

The airport has additional land bounded by farm land along Division Road and Lauzon Parkway for future airport expansion.

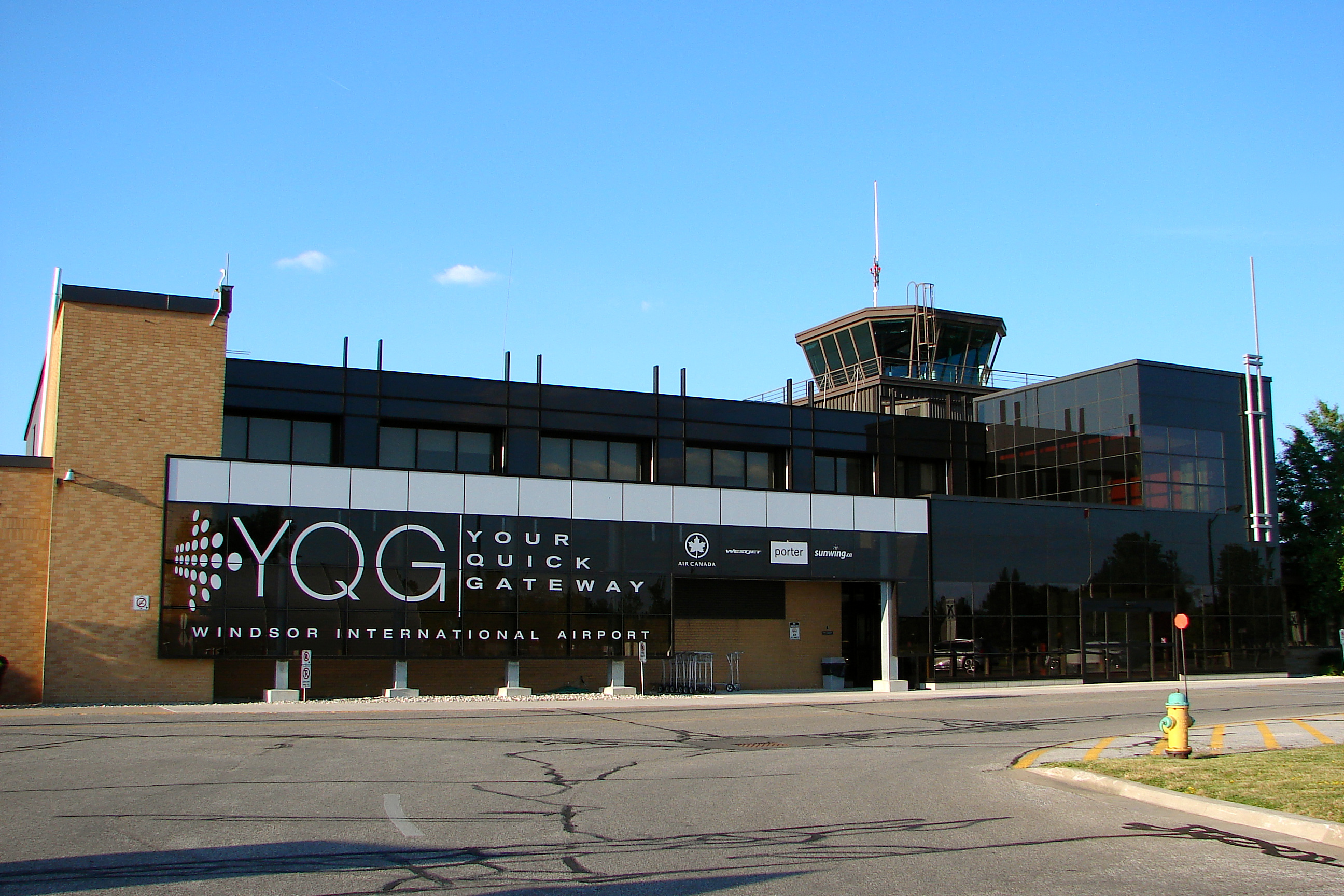
Windsor Airport terminal

In 2012, The Windsor Star reported that airport traffic had increased over 160% since 2008, with over 250,000 passengers passing through the airport in 2012, its busiest year ever. This has widely been attributed to aggressive efforts to attract more flights to existing destinations, and to new destinations. In 2011, Porter Airlines began flying from Windsor to Toronto (Billy Bishop Toronto City Airport) and Porter declared that Windsor is one of its most successful new markets. However, 37% of the local market still uses Detroit Metro Airport as its airport of choice.

In early October 2013, the City of Windsor announced it would invest $14.1 million into the airport to create a multi-modal cargo terminal. The project is expected to create approximately 105 jobs for the City of Windsor and has the potential to create thousands of jobs. The first tenant for the new cargo hub at Windsor Airport would be FedEx which signed a 20-year lease to run the hub and it was moved into the facility by December 1, 2015. In 2016 the airport handled 331,000 passengers.

In June 2020, Air Canada ended its Windsor to Montreal service due to the financial impact of the COVID-19 pandemic in Canada.

== Airlines and destinations ==
=== Passenger ===
Airlines	Destinations
Air Canada Express	Toronto–Pearson
Air Transat	Seasonal: Cancún (begins December 19, 2026), Punta Cana
Cameron Air Service	Seasonal: Pelee Island
Porter Airlines	Ottawa
WestJet	Seasonal: Calgary, Cancún

== Tenants ==
- 364 Squadron Royal Canadian Air Cadets
- Windsor Flying Club
- Canadian Historical Aircraft Association
- Journey Air/ Great Lakes Flight Centre
- Skyservice fixed-base operator (FBO)
- AAR Corp. - airframe maintenance (MRO)
- Gateway Aviation (Fixed Base Operator)
- WorldFuel - Fuel Services
- Airways Aviation (Ground Handling services)
- Avis (Car rental)
- Budget (Car rental)
- Enterprise (Car rental)

== Technical information ==
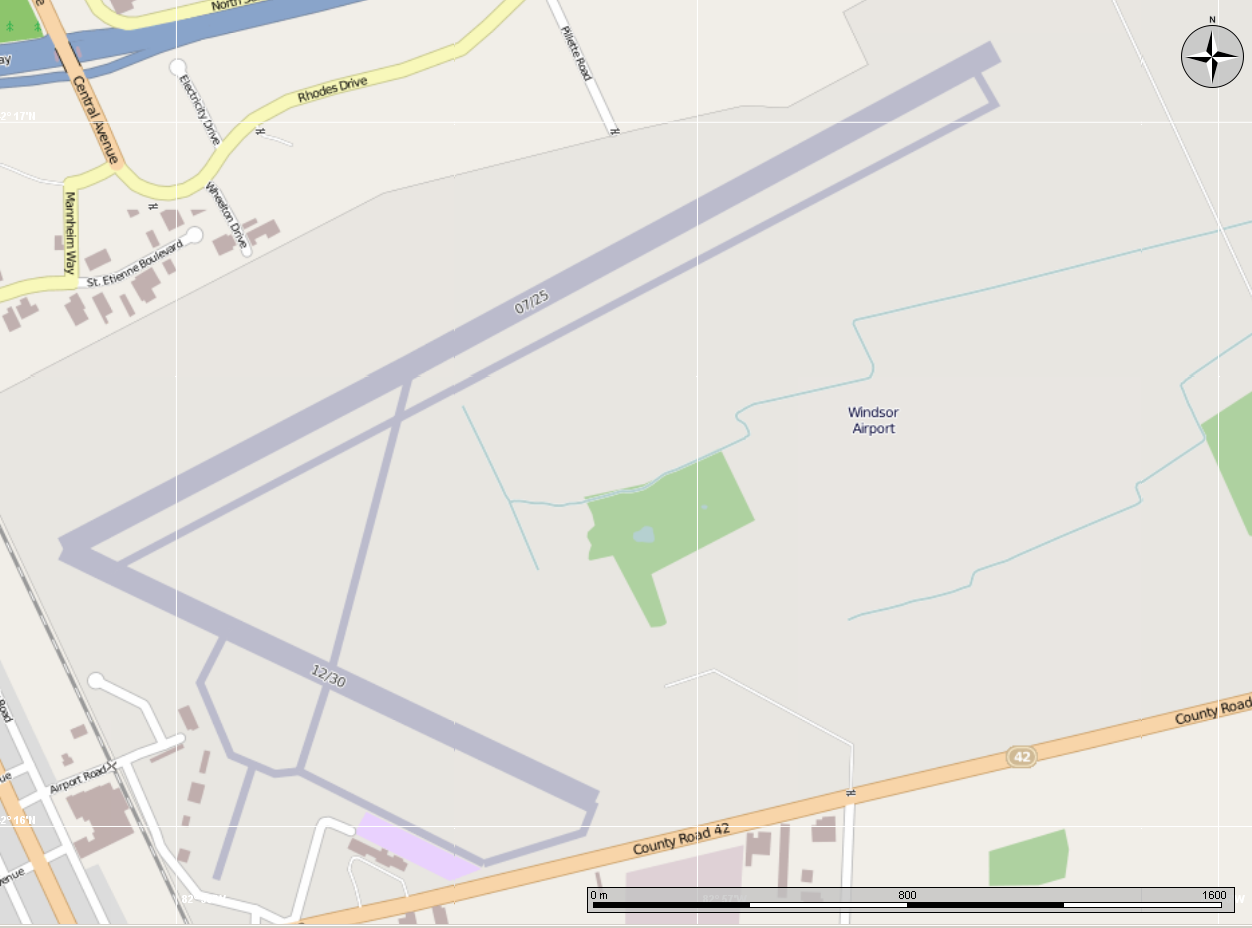
Map of the airport

=== General ===
- Latitude/Longitude: 42° 16' 32" N, 82° 57' 20" W
- Elevation: 622 ft (190 m)
- Magnetic variation: 7° W

The airport is operated by Your Quick Gateway Inc. on behalf of the City of Windsor, is certified by Transport Canada, and operates as an airport of entry with Canadian customs services available. There is a landing fee for some aircraft.

=== Runways ===
- Runway 07/25: 9,000 by 200 ft (2,743 by 61 m), asphalt, lighted, PAPI type 2 approach lighting for both ends
- Runway 12/30: 5,150 by 150 ft (1,570 by 46 m), asphalt, lighted, PAPI type 2 approach lighting for both ends

=== Communications ===
- Remote Communications Outlet (RCO): London Radio, 123.375 MHz
- Automatic Terminal Information Service (ATIS): 134.5 MHz
- Ground control: 121.7 MHz
- Tower: 124.7 MHz (mandatory frequency when tower is closed)
- IFR arrivals and departures: Detroit Approach Control, 124.9 MHz
- Visual Flight Rules (VFR) advisories: Windsor-area Detroit Approach Control, 126.85 MHz

=== Navigation aids ===
- Non-directional beacons (NDB): Windsor (QG), 353 kHz, 250° 3.8 nautical miles (7.0 km; 4.4 mi) to airport; Laurel (ZQG), 398 kHz, 70° 4.0 NM (7.4 km; 4.6 mi) to airport
- Instrument landing system (ILS): runway 25 (IQG)

=== Fixed-base operator (FBO) ===
Parking is available from the airport operator; there is a charge for parking longer than six hours.

- Gateway Aviation (WorldFuel): Avgas and Jet-A fuel

=== Fire & Rescue ===
Category 6 ARFF coverage is provided by airport operations employees. Two E-One 4x4 ARFF vehicles are stationed at the airport firehall. Windsor Fire & Rescue Service provides structural fire coverage and mutual aid and Essex-Windsor EMS provides medical assistance at the airport.

Apparatus:

- Red 1: 1995 E-One Titan 1500 4x4
- Red 2: 2014 E-One Titan 1500 4x4

== Statistics ==
Annual passenger traffic
Year	Total passengers	% change
2011	189,600	Steady
2012	215,047	▲13.4%
2013	241,684	▲11.0%
2014	248,586	▲2.9%
2015	267,628	▲7.1%
2016	319,866	▲19.5%
2017	307,287	▼3.9%
2018	320,243	▲4.2%
2019	318,098	▼0.7%
2020	64,986	▼79.6%
2021	61,862	▼4.8%
2022	141,743	▲129.1%
2023	185,396	▲30.8%
2024	138,335	▼25.4%
2025	119,968	▼13.3%
