= Essex County Board of Education =

The Essex County Board of Education (ECBE) was a school district serving Essex County, Ontario, Canada, headquartered in Essex. In 1998 it was amalgamated with the Windsor Board of Education into the Greater Essex County District School Board.

== Secondary schools ==
- Belle River District High School
- Essex District High School
- General Amherst High School
- Harrow District High School
- Kingsville District High School
- Leamington District Secondary School
- Sandwich Secondary School
- Western Secondary School
