= Windsor Board of Education =

School district in Ontario, Canada

The Windsor Board of Education (WBOE) was a school district in Windsor, Ontario, Canada.

The district, prior to its closure, had 32 elementary schools, eight secondary schools, and 7 agency schools. In 1998 it was amalgamated with the Essex County Board of Education into the Greater Essex County District School Board.

== Schools ==
Elementary:

- Bellewood
- Central
- Concord (merger of Prince Charles & John McCrae in 1987)
- Coronation
- David Maxwell
- Dougall Avenue
- Eastwood
- Forest Glade
- Frank Begley
- General Brock
- Glenwood
- Gordon McGregor
- H.D. Taylor
- Hetherington
- Hugh Beaton
- J.E. Benson
- John Campbell
- John McWilliam
- King Edward
- Marlborough
- Maryvale
- Northwood
- Oakwood
- Parkview
- Percy P. McCallum
- Prince Edward
- Prince of Wales
- Princess Anne
- Princess Elizabeth
- Queen Victoria
- Roseland
- Roseville
- Southwood
- W.G. Davis

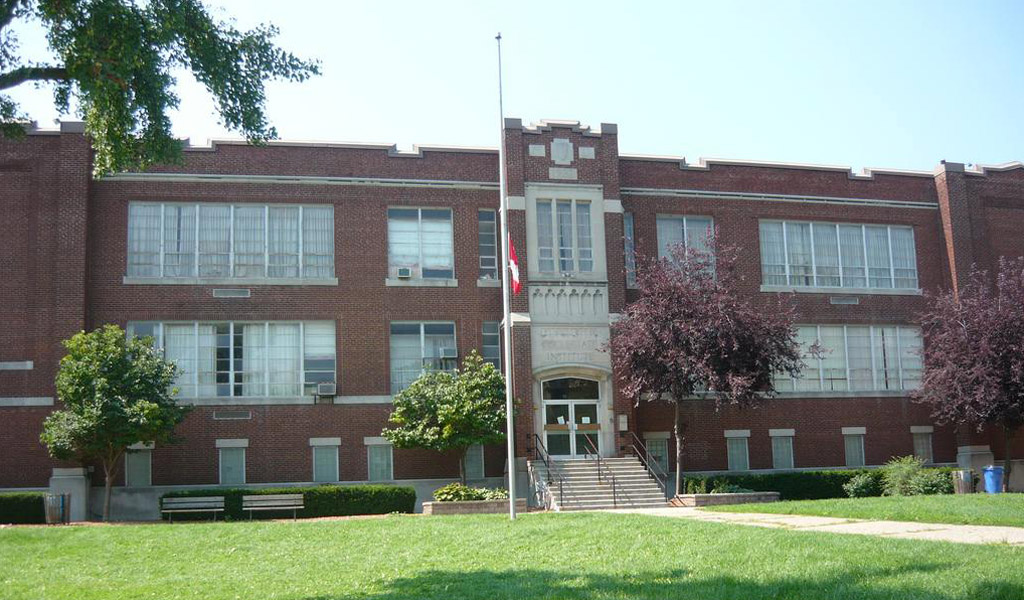
J.L. Forster Secondary School

Secondary:

- Century Secondary School
- J.L. Forster Secondary School
- Honourable W.C. Kennedy Collegiate
- W. D. Lowe High School
- Vincent Massey Secondary School
- Riverside Secondary School
- Walkerville Collegiate Institute

Closed prior to dissolution:

- Centennial Secondary School
