= Roseland Public School =

Location
- 620 Cabana Road East; Windsor, Ontario, N9G 1A4; Canada; 42.25962°N 82.99272°W

Information
- School type: Coeducational public elementary school
- Founded: 1914
- School board: Greater Essex County District School Board
- Superintendent: John Howitt
- Area trustee: Kim McKinley, Jessica Sartori
- School number: 55
- Principal: John Wayvon
- Staff: 44
- Grades: JK–8
- Enrollment: 600
- Language: English
- Team name: Roseland Rams

Roseland Public School is a public elementary school located in Windsor, Ontario. Founded in 1913, the school has been expanded repeatedly to meet the needs of a growing population. Roseland offers many academic, athletic, and community activities for both students and parents.

== Early history ==
Originally proposed in 1913, Roseland Public school first opened in 1914 as a one-room schoolhouse with an enrollment of 25 students under the supervision of their teacher, Alta Williams. As enrollment in the school grew, the demand for more classroom space became critical, and in 1925 a new two-room school was constructed to replace the aging pre-World War I structure. In 1928, under the guidance of new principal Olive Marcoux, the school was expanded again, doubling in classroom space while adding a teacher's room, furnace, and male-female washrooms.

Development of Roseland Public School was halted following the onset of the Second World War, and the fourth classroom was not staffed and furnished until 1940. Windsor expanded rapidly following the war, and Roseland was expanded as well, as enrollment rose to 310 students by 1988. The school tripled in size, adding hallways, classrooms, principal's office, library. The library was named after the long-serving Mrs. Marcoux, who retired in 1969, after serving Roseland Public School for almost half a century.

In February 2013, Roseland Public School came under widespread media attention and criticism when two teachers pulled an elaborate prank on the school's graduating 8th Grade class. The students were told that they were going to the Walt Disney World Resort in Orlando, Florida, but then revealed that the students would be going to a local bowling alley instead.

== Recent history ==
During the 1990s and 2000s, a housing boom in Windsor led to rapidly rising school enrollment. In 2000, overcrowding had become so severe that approximately 260 Grade 8 students were moved to nearby Massey Secondary School. By 2003, development projects were underway across the region to address the overcrowding problems. Roseland school's problems were specifically highlighted as an issue during consultations, as then-superintendent Penny Allen remarked:

"Roseland school is being totally overwhelmed by new development."

In response, school trustees approved a $1.7 million addition to Roseland, which would add eight classrooms and an additional (fourth) hallway to the existing structure—original plans only called for six classrooms to be added, but population projections indicated the need for two more. In addition, committees of students and parents identified the need for additional schools to be built in South Windsor to ease the burden on Roseland Public school and its sister schools. These demands culminated in the 2005 announcement of Talbot Trail Public School, which was constructed in a single year and opened in 2006 in which 228 of Roseland's students went to the new Talbot Trail Public School.

Following the completion of construction, Roseland Public school was the subject of a pair of high-profile intruder incidents when, in 2007, a male suspect was spotted in the school in the early afternoon. After the first incident, police patrols were stepped up to protect students and deter the individual. However, two days later he returned, which triggered the school's safety lockdown procedures and provoked a police response. Worried teachers and parents commented that "This is something that you see on the news somewhere else. This stuff doesn't happen around here." While the incident ended without harm, the school had earlier defended its reputation by filing a complaint against The Windsor Star, for a 1994 article "Parents fear for children's safety at school", alleging that it left the erroneous impression that Roseland school was a "violent, threatening and unsafe environment [for students]". While the Star was commended for its publications on the issue of school violence, the Windsor Media Council found that the article was not balanced and inaccurate.

== Non-academic and community programs ==
As part of the South Windsor community, Roseland Public School takes part in many social and community activities. As part of the Ontario Ministry of Education's "Healthy Schools" initiative, the school began healthy snack, bullying prevention, and physical activity programs, to promote health and well-being. Roseland also takes part in many fund raising and community improvement activities, such as food and clothing drives, tree planting, and Earth Week celebrations.
