= Centennial Secondary School (Windsor, Ontario) =

Location
- 1400 Northwood Street; Windsor, Ontario, N9E 1A4; Canada
- Coordinates: 42.27758°N 83.03371°W

Information
- School type: Public high school
- Founded: 1967
- School board: Windsor Board of Education
- Grades: 9 to 13
- Language: English
- Area: South Windsor
- Colours: Black & Orange
- Team name: Cougars

Centennial Secondary School is a former public secondary school in Windsor, Ontario that was operated by the Windsor Board of Education. It was in operation from 1969 through June 1986. It merged with Vincent Massey Secondary School. The building now houses Holy Names High School.

In February 1970 about 120 U.S. history students from Centennial visited Murray-Wright High School in Detroit. In April 1970 85 black students from Murray-Wright visited Centennial for a day to discuss whether they preferred nonviolent or violent methods of achieving racial equality.

By March 1986 the Windsor Separate School Board had attempted to acquire the school campus but the secular board did not allow it. In July 1986 the secular public board agreed to hand over the building to the Catholic separate board. The Catholic district planned to reopen it as Holy Names in September of that year.
