= F. J. Brennan =

F. J. Brennan may refer to:

- Francis Brennan (cardinal) (1894-1968), American Roman Catholic Cardinal
- F. J. Brennan Catholic High School, Canadian high school
