= HDHS =

HDHS may refer to:

- Haribhai Deokaran High School, Solapur, Maharashtra, Inhdospjdv kdippodnlñs
- Harrow District High School, Harrow, Ontario, Canada
- Harwich and Dovercourt High School, Essex, England
- Hiwassee Dam High School, Murphy, North Carolina, United States
