= Cardinal Carter =

Cardinal Carter may refer to:

- Cardinal Carter Academy for the Arts, Catholic arts high school located in Toronto, Ontario, Canada
- Cardinal Carter Catholic High School, Catholic secondary school located in Aurora, Ontario, Canada
- Cardinal Carter Catholic Secondary School, Catholic secondary school located in Leamington, Ontario, Canada
- G. Emmett Cardinal Carter Library, at King's University College (University of Western Ontario)
- Gerald Emmett Carter (1912–2003), Cardinal Archbishop of Toronto
