= Talbot Trail Public School =

Location
- 4000 Ducharme Street; Windsor, Ontario, N9G 0A1; Canada; 42.25204°N 82.97332°W

Information
- School type: Coeducational public elementary school
- Motto: Exploring the Potential in each Learner
- Established: 2006
- School board: Greater Essex County District School Board
- Superintendent: Dr. Clara Howitt
- Area trustee: Linda Qin; Jessica Sartori
- School number: 153
- Principal: Michael Baker
- Staff: 82
- Grades: JK-8
- Enrollment: 900
- Language: English
- Area: South Windsor
- Colours: Black, blue, green
- Team name: Talbot Trail Blazers
- Newspaper: None

Talbot Trail Public School is a public elementary school in Windsor, Ontario.

== History ==
During the 1990s, a housing boom in Windsor lead to rapidly rising enrollment in the region, particularly in elementary schools. By 2000, the problem had become critical, with several area schools housing hundreds more students than their designs called for, and elementary students being temporarily moved to area high schools to ease overcrowding. Consultations with parents and students identified the need for additional schools in the area, and in 2005 these demands culminated with the announcement of Talbot Trail Public School.

The groundbreaking, presided over by Windsor mayor Eddie Francis, was financed by issuing $50 million in debt, part of which was also earmarked for Lakeshore Discovery School. Construction took only a single year, coming in both on-time and under-budget, and the first classes were held in the September 2006, 228 students came from Roseland Public School, and more from other schools. The school was the first of several "themed" schools to be built in Essex County; Talbot Trail was designed by Windsor architects Archon Architect Incorporated and was inspired by the idea of "exploration". The interior of Talbot Trail features a Viking long ship, stonework emulating the Earth's layers, and fiber-optic constellations in the library.

== Activities ==
The school has a student parliament. The school has many sports teams such as basketball, track and field, cross-country, badminton, soccer, floor hockey and volleyball.
