= ECBE =

ECBE may refer to:

- Essex County Board of Education
- European Council for Business Education
