= J. L. Forster Secondary School =

J.L. Forster Secondary School
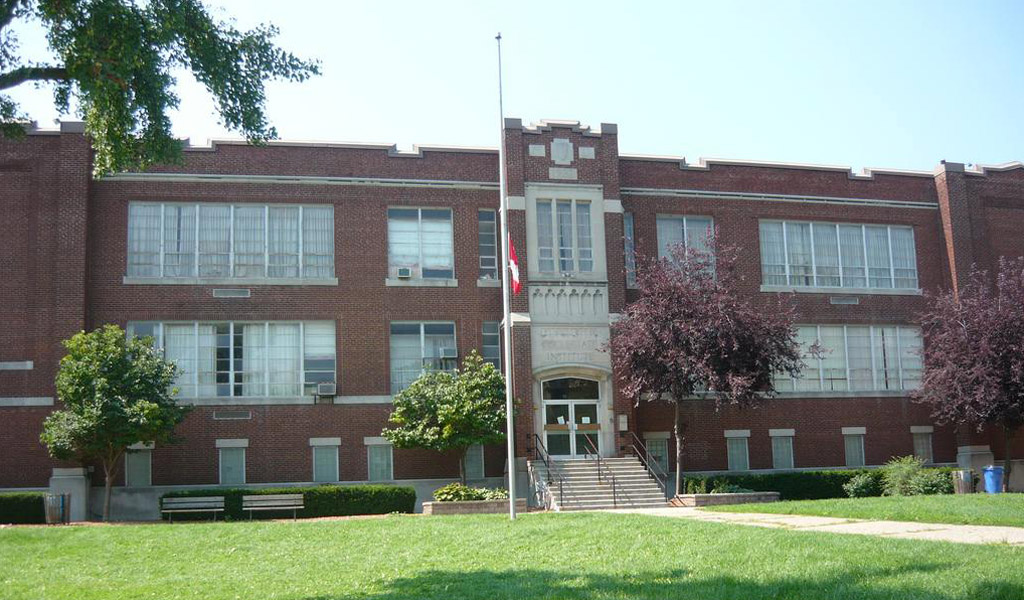

Location
- 749 Felix Avenue; Windsor, Ontario, N9C 3K9; Canada; 42.29864°N 83.07051°W

Information
- School type: Public
- Founded: 1922
- Status: Closed
- Closed: 2014
- School board: Greater Essex County District School Board
- Superintendent: John Howitt
- Principal: David Garlick
- Grades: 9–12
- Enrolment: 315 (2013-2014)

John L. Forster Secondary School, often referred to as J.L. Forster or Forster, was a high school in the west end of Windsor, Ontario, Canada. Founded in 1922 as General Byng Elementary School, it was later repurposed as a secondary school; it also underwent two name changes, eventually being named after its first principal. It was located within the authority of the Greater Essex County District School Board (GECDSB) and was assessed at 2.1 out of 10 in academic performance by the Fraser Institute.

== History ==
Forster was originally built in 1922 as an elementary school to service Sandwich. Designed by Andrew J. Riddell and named after General Julian Byng, the original building cost CAD 250,000 to build and included ten classrooms, an auditorium, a gymnasium, and a swimming pool; the pool was the first owned by an elementary school in the area. John L. Forster was chosen as its first principal. As the community expanded, it was repurposed as a secondary school and renamed Sandwich Collegiate.

During World War II, 421 students and alumni served in the Canadian Armed Forces; of these, 32 died during the war. Those casualties are memorialized with a plaque in the main hall. In 1950, the first of seven additions was made, and in 1954 Forster retired, with the school being renamed in his honour shortly afterwards. In 1966, a fire in the auditorium caused it to undergo remodeling.

The music program was started in 1960 by Ernie Geranda, who continued to supervise it until 1980. Between 1967 and 1972, Forster's 90-member band (nicknamed The Red Coats) went to Montreal for Expo '67, Osaka, Japan, for Expo '70, and Windsor, England to perform in the Windsor Royal Music Festival for Queen Elizabeth II.

Forster was chosen to host Windsor and Essex County's English as a Second Language (ESL) program. It also hosted the Sandwich Community Health Centre.

In August 2011, the band held a reunion. Held partially as a fundraiser to establish a scholarship for Forster students wishing to study music at the University of Windsor, it reunited 185 former members.

The school was closed in May 2014, due to declining enrolment. Students were transferred to Westview Freedom Academy, approximately 1.3 km away. The building was being used as a community centre for the west end of Windsor until 2020.

A demolition permit has been requested as of February 12, 2025, but has not been issued.

== Academics ==
In 2011, Forster was rated 2.1 out of 10 in academic achievement by the Fraser Institute; this was the lowest score in Windsor and 705th out of 727 throughout the province. The score was based on data from the Education Quality and Accountability Office, which reported that 53.2 percent of Forster students scored below average in the Ontario Secondary School Literacy Test and the standardized math testing. The results were rejected by John Howitt, superintendent of the GECDSB, who indicated that the large ESL program had skewed the results.

== Demographics ==
In 2011, Forster had 480 students, with 51 percent recent immigrants taking an ESL or English Language Development (ELD) course; the ESL program was for students who had received formal education in their native countries, while the ELD program was for those who had not. A total of 55 countries were represented.

== Notable alumni ==
- Tamim Chowdhury, ISIL terrorist
- John Millson, former mayor of Windsor
- Ali Haidar, basketball player

== See also ==
- List of high schools in Ontario

== Works cited ==
- Chen, Dalson (9 May 2011). "Villanova ranks high, Forster ranks worst in Windsor: Fraser Institute Report: St. Thomas of Villanova in LaSalle placed 23rd out of 727 high schools across Ontario". Windsor Star. Archived from the original on 11 May 2011.
- "Haidar takes care picking U.S. school". Canada.com. 26 November 2008. Archived from the original on 23 May 2014.
- Lajoie, Don (24 May 2011). "Forster achievements belie Fraser Institute's scoring: Student 'heroes' often refugees". Windsor Star. Alt URL
- Pearce, Kristie (1 August 2011). "Discipline helped band members hit life's high notes". Windsor Star. Archived from the original on 11 August 2011.
- Shaw, Ted (30 April 2011). "Redcoats: Time of their lives: Forster band travelled the world". Windsor Star.
- "J. L. Forster Secondary School". Doorsopenwindsor.com. Archived from the original on 11 August 2011.
