= FJB =

FJB may refer to:

- F. J. Brennan Catholic High School, in Windsor, Ontario, Canada
- Fender Jazz Bass, an electric bass guitar
- Wien Franz-Josefs-Bahnhof, a train station in Vienna, Austria
- Fuck Joe Biden, a political slogan in the United States often referred to via the euphemism Let's Go Brandon
