= Sandwich Secondary School =

School in LaSalle, Ontario, Canada

Location
- 7050 Malden Road; LaSalle, Ontario, Ontario, N9J 2T5; Canada; 42.22396°N 83.05897°W

Information
- School type: public secondary school
- School board: Greater Essex County District School Board
- Superintendent: Joe Bell
- Area trustee: Ron Le Clair
- School number: 939765
- Principal: Joe Marusic
- Grades: 9 to 12
- Enrollment: 1,040 (2020-21)
- Language: English, French
- Area: LaSalle, Ontario
- Colours: Blue and Orange
- Mascot: Sabretoothed Tiger: Erbas
- Team name: Sabres
- Website: Sandwich Secondary School

Sandwich Secondary School is a school in LaSalle, Ontario. It has about 1,050 students, and teaches about half of the students in LaSalle, along with St. Thomas of Villanova Catholic Secondary School. Sandwich Secondary School is part of the Greater Essex County District School Board, or GECDSB. It was named after the former town of Sandwich, which used to encompass the western shores of Windsor, as well as LaSalle.

== About ==
Prior to the opening of the school building in 1975, high school students in LaSalle were bused to General Amherst High School.

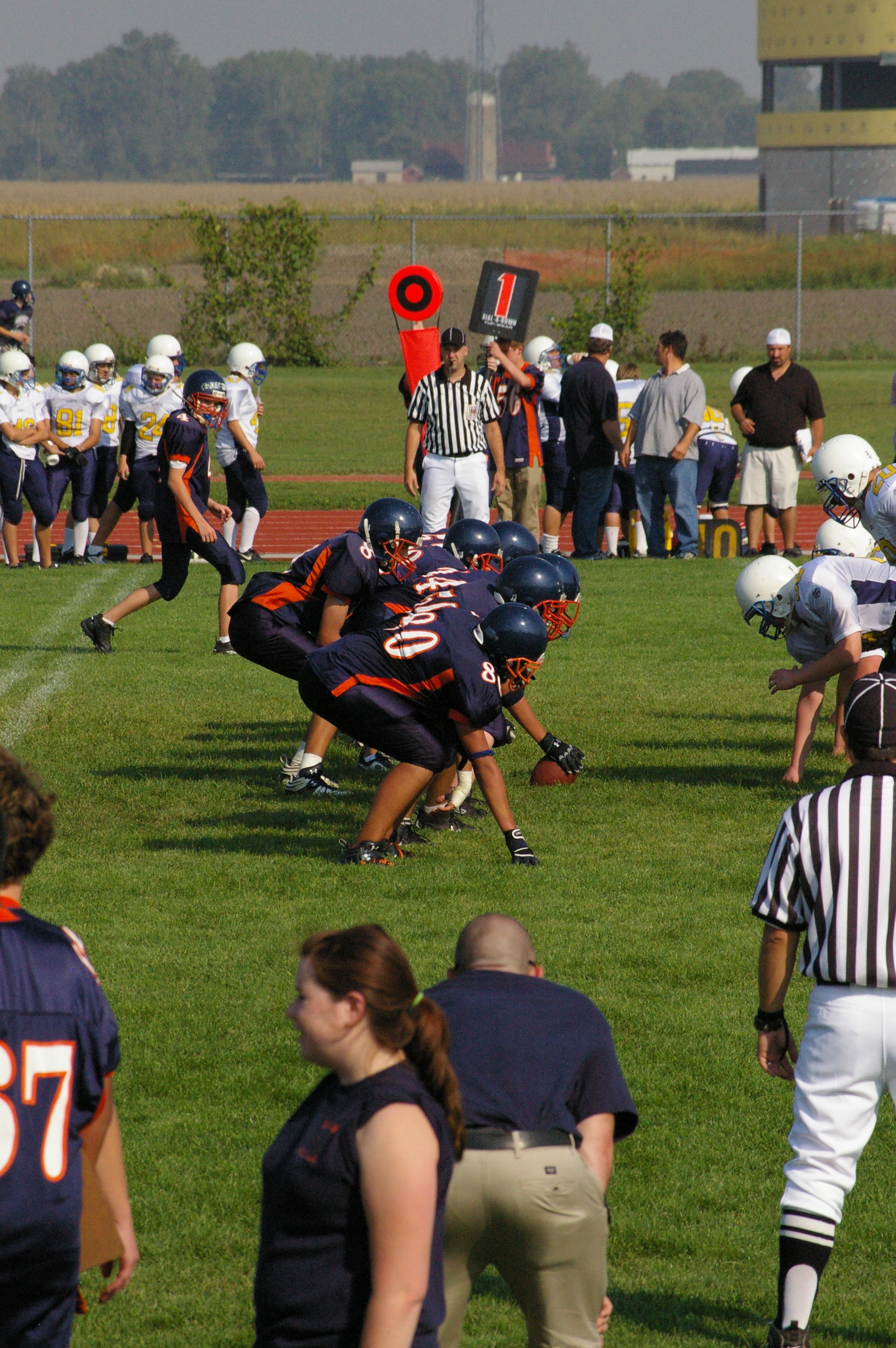
Sandwich Sabres football

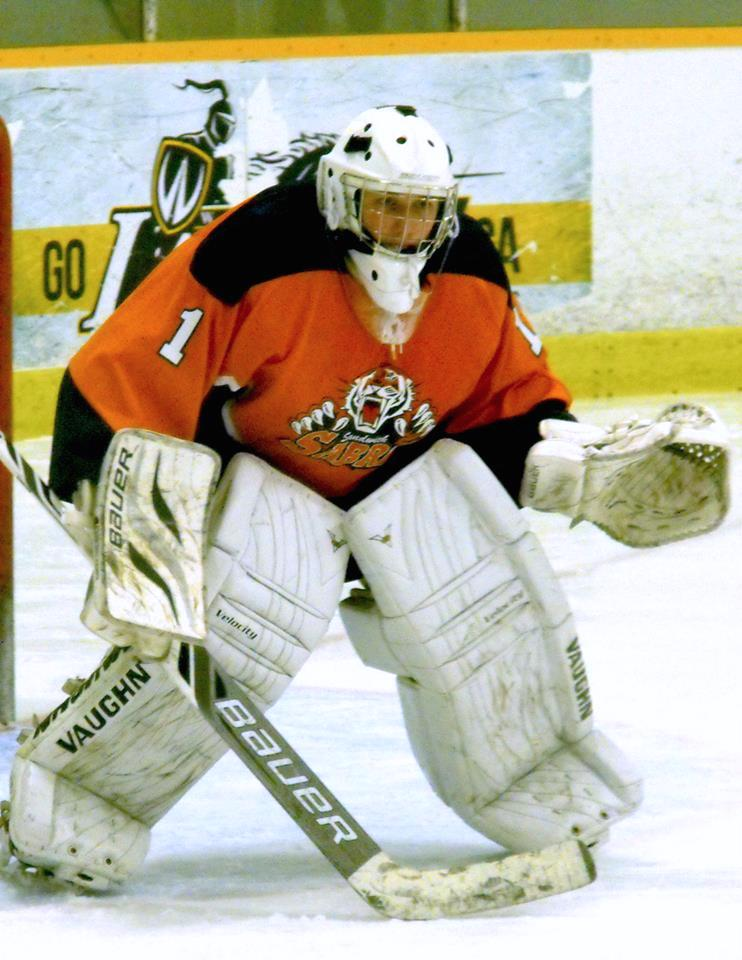
Sabres goalie in 2014.

Sandwich Secondary's track-and-field complex, named the Robert C. Carrick Memorial Track, opened in 1993 at a cost of $1.70 million and includes an 8-lane rubberized all weather track, field house, grandstand, football and soccer field, baseball diamond, track and field event area (shot-put, a discus circle, all weather javelin approach, all weather runways for long jump, triple jump, pole vault), and a concession stand. The complex was named after a police officer who was killed in the line of duty in 1968 and is home to the Sandwich Sabres Men's Football team. Many nearby schools utilize the complex for their own track-and-field events. Sandwich Secondary also has a French immersion program for those coming from French immersion grade schools along with an English public schooling.

Its feeder schools, or family of elementary schools, are Sandwich West Public School, LaSalle Public School, Sacred Heart Roman Catholic School, Legacy Oak Trail Public School, James L. Dunn Public School, and École Bellewood Public School.

== Athletics ==
Sandwich Secondary School has many sports teams including basketball, volleyball, soccer, baseball, wrestling, ultimate Frisbee, squash, track and field, tennis, cross country running, football, curling, hockey, swimming, badminton, and softball.

Sandwich has won many recent titles in many different sports. The Sabres won the 2022 OFSAA Track and Field Championships.

Their Ultimate Frisbee Team were the 2022 SWOSSAA Champions and Competed at the OFSAA Championships in Toronto.

Sandwich's open doubles Tennis team of Carter Furmanek and Vishaal Metha, also won the SWOSSA Championships in 2022.

== Notable alumni ==
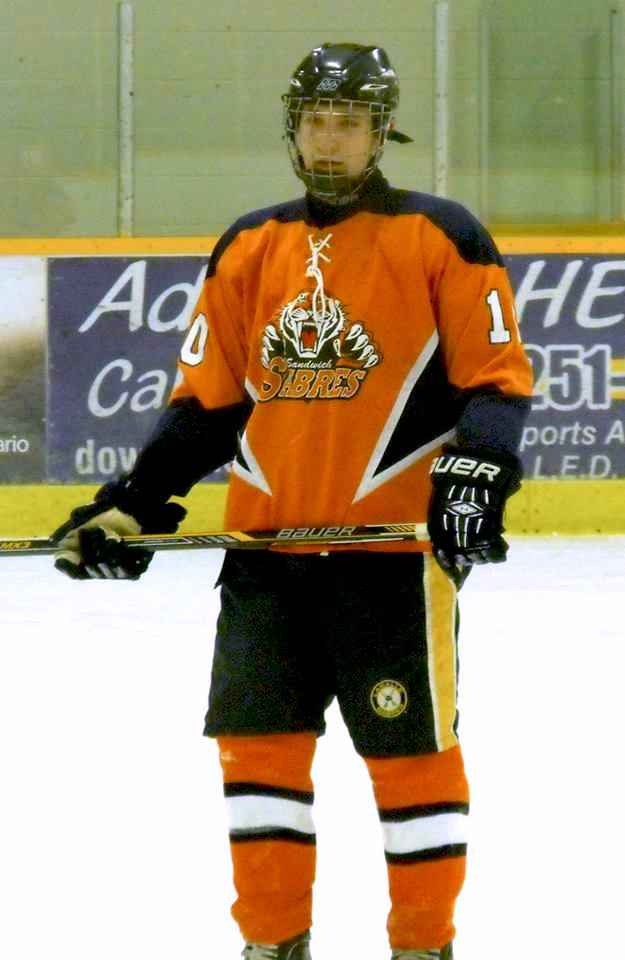
Luke Gecse - Sandwich Sabres player in 2014. Who is etched into the Ontario Hockey Association (OHA) record books for an incredibly rare feat: scoring three shorthanded, unassisted goals in a single game.

- Tang Bacheyie — former CFL player
- Dave Beneteau — lawyer, MMA fighter
- Jeff Burrows — drums, percussion, The Tea Party
- Stuart Chatwood — bass, guitar, keyboards, The Tea Party
- Andy Delmore — former NHL player
- Richie Hawtin — electronic music artist, DJ
- Jeff Martin — vocals, guitar, The Tea Party
- Kylie Masse — Olympic swimmer
- Kamau Peterson – former CFL player
- Amanda Reason — Olympic swimmer and former women's 50-metre breaststroke world record-holder (long course)
- Sofia Shinas — actress
- Christian Vincent — professional dancer, choreographer, actor and model

== See also ==
- Education in Ontario
- List of secondary schools in Ontario
