= Don Brkovich =

Canadian basketball player

- Born: June 24, 1959

Don Brkovich (born June 24, 1959) is a member of the 1979 Michigan Spartan championship college basketball team that won the title when they played Indiana State (33-0) led by Larry Bird.

His older brother Mike, known as the "Canadian Golden Arm", was a starter on that fabled team. The Brkovich brothers are the only known NCAA Canadian brothers to win this coveted title. Don later transferred to New Mexico and finished his career playing for the Lobos and Gary Colson.
