= St. Michael's Alternative High School =

Catholic secondary school in Windsor, Ontario

Coordinates: 42°18′10.2″N 83°04′18.2″W

St. Michael's Alternative High School is a private Catholic high school located in Windsor, Ontario. St. Michaels is administered by the Windsor-Essex Catholic District School Board. In addition to the Windsor location, St. Michael's has additional locations in Essex, Ontario and a second location in Windsor for adult learning.

== See also ==
- Education in Ontario
- List of secondary schools in Ontario
