= Ali Haidar (basketball) =

Lebanese-Canadian basketball player

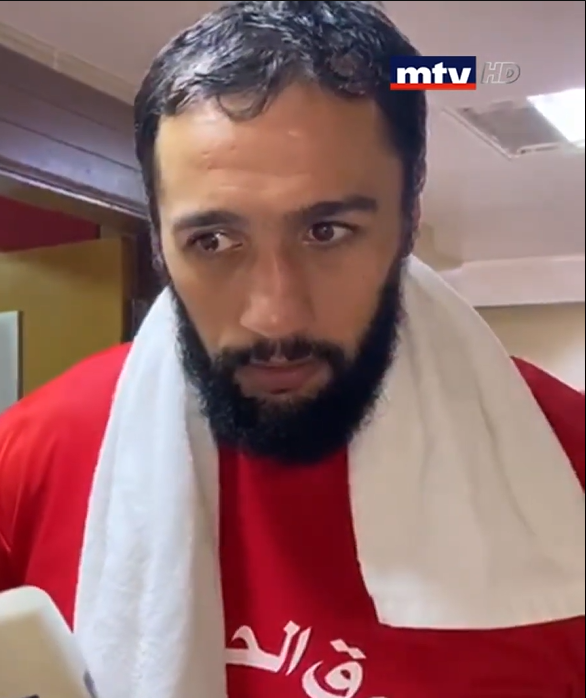

No. 40 – Homenetmen
- Position: Power forward / center
- League: Lebanese Basketball League

Personal information
- Born: 20 July 1990 (age 36) Qana, Lebanon
- Listed height: 6 ft 8 in (2.03 m)
- Listed weight: 240 lb (109 kg)

Career information
- High school: J.L. Forster Secondary School (Ahliah School)
- College: Michigan Tech (2009–2013)
- NBA draft: 2013: undrafted
- Playing career: 2013–present

Career history
- 2013–2018: Al Riyadi
- 2018–2019: Beirut Club
- 2019–2020: Champville SC
- 2019: → Saskatchewan Rattlers
- 2019–2020: → Al Wehdat Club
- 2020–2022: Dynamo Club Lebanon
- 2022–2025: Beirut Club
- 2025–2026: Sagesse SC
- 2026–present: Homenetmen

Career highlights
- 4× Lebanese Basketball League champion (2014–2017); Jordanian Premier Basketball League champion (2020)
Medals
Men's basketball
Representing Lebanon
FIBA Asia Cup
Silver medal – second place	2022 Jakarta
Arab Basketball Championship
Gold medal – first place	2022 Dubai

Mohamed Ali Haidar (Arabic: علي حيدر, born in Lebanon on 20 July 1990) is a Lebanese-Canadian professional basketball player for Homenetmen of the Lebanese Basketball League.

== Career ==
Haidar born in Qana, Lebanon to Mohammad and Mona Haidar. He has four brothers and two sisters. He immigrated with his family to Canada in 2006, where he studied at J.L. Forster Secondary School in Windsor, Ontario, playing starting 2006–2007 season in the high school's Forster Spartans basketball team.

Upon graduation from Forster, he was offered a scholarship at Michigan Technological University in Houghton, Michigan, USA specializing in an engineering double major starting 2010 while playing for the MTU Huskies basketball program playing in the GLIAC (GLIAC) in NCAA Division II.

=== In Lebanon ===
The Lebanese Basketball Federation invited Haidar for summer tryouts in June 2011. He was one of 25 players competing for 12 spots on the national team. He had his international debut playing in a regional tournament in Jordan, representing Lebanon.

Between 2013 and 2018, he played professionally in the Lebanese basketball club Sporting Al Riyadi Beirut. In 2018, he moved to play for Beirut Club.

In the 2021–22 season, he moved to Dynamo Beirut to reach the Final Four and went back to Beirut Club in the 2022–23 season, having the chance to play in Al Wasl Tournament.
