= Kingsville District High School =

Coordinates: 42.0394°N 82.7317°W

Location
- 170 Main Street East; Kingsville, Ontario, N9Y 186; Canada

Information
- School type: Public high school defunct
- Founded: 1921
- School board: Greater Essex County District School Board
- Superintendent: Josh Canty
- Area trustee: Julia Burgess
- Principal: Bill Toews
- Vice Principal: Michelle Gursoy
- Senior Secretary: Madeline Kirzinger
- Grades: 9 to 12
- Enrollment: 656
- Language: English
- Colours: Purple and gold
- Team name: Kingsville Cavaliers
- Website: Official website

Kingsville District High School was a public high school in Kingsville, Ontario, Canada. Enrollment is 656 students. KDHS feeder schools are Harrow Public School, Kingsville Public School and Jack Miner Public School. The school was the "Home of the Cavaliers".

== History ==
The school opened in 1921 at its present location after a fire destroyed Essex District High School. There were then three teachers and about 100 students.

In 1953, a new building was erected on the site, with additions in 1954, 1963, 1967 and 1972.

In 2016 Harrow District High School closed and merged with Kingsville District High School.

In June 2016, Kingsville District High School students held a Pride flag raising ceremony to recognize June as LGBT Pride Month. The school was one of the first in the district to raise a pride flag.

In 2024, Kingsville District High School officially closed when students moved into the new Erie Migration District School.

== Future ==
In April 2016, the Ministry of Education announced funding for a $44-million JK-to-g 12 school to be located in Kingsville. The new school would consolidate students from Kingsville District High School, Harrow District High School, Kingsville Public School, and Jack Miner Public School, and may be the most expensive school the province has ever built.

In 2021, the project was tendered over budget. In March 2022, the Ministry of Education announced the full $59 million to complete the project. The school was expected to open in 2024.

== See also ==
- Education in Ontario
- List of secondary schools in Ontario
