= Assumption College School =

Assumption College Catholic High School

Location
- 1100 Huron Church Road; Windsor, Ontario, N9C 2K7; Canada; 42.2954°N 83.0614°W

Information
- School type: Separate high school
- Motto: "Teach us goodness, discipline and knowledge"
- Religious affiliation: Roman Catholic
- Founded: 1870
- School board: Windsor-Essex Catholic District School Board
- Superintendent: Rosemary Lo Faso
- Area trustee: Joe Iacono
- Principal: Kevin Bellaire
- Grades: 9-12
- Enrollment: Approx. 1100 (2025-2026)
- Language: English
- Colours: Purple and White
- Mascot: Purple Raider
- Team name: The Purple Raiders
- Feeder schools: Assumption Middle School; St. James Catholic Elementary School
- Special Programs: International Baccalaureate Diploma Program (IB)
- Website: wecdsb.on.ca/acs

Assumption College Catholic High School is a Catholic secondary school in Windsor, Ontario. The school was originally established as a private preparatory school by Assumption College, now Assumption University, but it is now a publicly funded separate school under the jurisdiction of the Windsor-Essex Catholic District School Board. It offers the International Baccalaureate Diploma Program and Specialist High School Majors Programs in addition to the Ontario Secondary School Diploma.

== History ==
"Assumption College" was founded by the Basilian Fathers in 1857 as common school, High School and College. Assumption College formally became Assumption College of the University of Western Ontario (1920–1953) and then Assumption University of Windsor in 1956, Assumption University in 1964 and is now affiliated with the University of Windsor.

The original 3-storey school housed the "common school," high school and college, residing together on the same grounds and in buildings owned by the Basilians. Mr. Theodule Girardot (at the school until 1871) is credited with maintaining the continuity of the school throughout its birthing pains. In its early years the school accommodated private boarders and day school attendees, male students only.

George McMahon Sr. notes in his history, "Assumption [around the turn of the 20th century] continued to be tasked to provide four different programs: a preparatory school for grades five to eight; a commercial course for those boys preparing for a life in business; a three-year academic course or high school and a four years Arts course with College level courses."

In their Academic Year 1932-33 booklet, the High School is referred to as the "High School Department," and includes a history for the school, lists of faculty and "officers," admission, expenses and fees, lists of courses for all three programs, names of students, etc. The booklet also notes that since "the affiliation of the College Department with the University of Western Ontario in 1920, the High School has become a separate unit. An academic course of four years preparing boys for college, a commercial course leading to positions in the business world, and one year preparatory course, are offered."

The Assumption High School Reporter, the student newspaper for Assumption High School began publication in 1937. The January 26, 1945 issue reports on the expansions that will benefit the High School: a new auditorium, plus "all the buildings now standing will be turned over entirely to High School use."

In the 1940s and early 50s the High School is stated to have resided in Dillon Hall (the latter still in existence on the property of the University of Windsor). The High School moved to its current location in 1957, a photo from c. 1957 and a postcard from c. 1965 shows the High School in two different incarnations at the 1100 Huron Road location. The Assumption College High School Chapel is listed on the Municipal Register but is not designated.

In 1971, with the merging of St. Mary's Academy, the High School became a co-educational secondary school within the Windsor-Essex Catholic District School Board.

In 2011, one of the school's former teachers, Father William Hodgson Marshall, pled guilty to sexually abusing students while teaching at Assumption. He had also been able to teach at Holy Names High School in Windsor, plus other Catholic High Schools in Toronto and Sudbury, where he sexually abused students between 1952 and 1986 as well.

== Current status ==
Assumption offers a range of secondary programs including the IB Diploma Programme, as well as Co-op, OYAP, SHSM Manufacturing, SHSM Hospitality and Tourism, and SHSM Health and Wellness. Assumption's student population decreased significantly between the early/mid-1990s to early 2020s, after which it started and continues to increase rapidly.

The school has a current population of approximately 1100 students. In the summer of 2024, two portable classrooms were built on the east side of the school, and in the summer of 2025, 6 more were constructed in the same location.

The principal is Kevin Bellaire.

== Teacher Awards ==
Assumption is home to many educators, as can be seen in the awards they receive.

=== Adam Mills ===
In 2016, Mills was awarded the prestigious Outstanding Educator Award from the University of Chicago after being nominated by one of his previous students. Mills was also awarded the 2022 Award for Excellence in Teaching High School/CEGEP Physics in Ontario. After the awards ceremony, in an interview with the Windsor Star, Mills said that "Providing my students with opportunities for them to discover the tricks of nature is a personal passion and this award has further fuelled that fire."

== See also ==
- Windsor-Essex Catholic District School Board
- Education in Ontario
- List of secondary schools in Ontario
