= Windsor-Essex Catholic District School Board =

Catholic school board in Ontario, Canada

Location
- 1325 California Avenue, Windsor, Ontario Windsor, and all municipalities of Essex County, Ontario Canada
- Coordinates: 42.294199°N 83.056784°W

District information
- Superintendents: 9
- Chair of the board: Lisa Soulliere
- Director of education: John Ulicny
- Schools: 44 (32 elementary, 3 middle, 9 secondary)
- Budget: CA$356.3 million (2026-2027)
- District ID: B67024

Students and staff
- Students: 23,250
- Teachers: 1,421
- Staff: 1,025

Other information
- Elected Trustees (2026-2027): Lisa Soulliere (Chair); Jason Lazarus (Vice-Chair); Kim Bouchard; Mary DiMenna; Frank DiTomasso; Mary Heath; Joe Iacono; Bernie Mastromattei; Fulvio Valentinis
- Board Chaplain: Father Matthew Kucharski
- Student Trustees: Kyle Esperanza; Charlotte Bondy
- Website: www.wecdsb.on.ca

The Windsor-Essex Catholic District School Board (WECDSB, known as English-language Separate District School Board of Education No. 37 prior to 1999) is the separate school board that oversees Catholic education in Windsor and the surrounding County of Essex, in Ontario, Canada. Its headquarters are in the Windsor-Essex Catholic Education Centre in Windsor. It provides administration to a total of 44 schools which provide classes from kindergarten to grade 12, where Catholic teachings permeate all areas of the curriculum.

The board was created in 1998 from the merger of the Windsor Separate School Board (WSSB) and the Essex County Separate School Board (ECSSB) as the anglophone and francophone separate school boards.

== Overview ==
The board's budget, spending and activities are directed by trustees who are elected for four-year terms, coincident with municipal elections in Ontario. Five trustees are elected to represent areas of Windsor, and four represent areas of the county. Two student trustees are also elected through by-elections of the Student Senate to represent the student body, and the clergy is also represented through a Board Chaplain.

== Schools ==
As of the 2024–2025 school year, the WECDSB administers 32 elementary schools, 3 middle schools, and 9 secondary schools.

=== Secondary Schools ===
- Assumption College School
- Cardinal Carter Catholic Secondary School
- Catholic Central High School
- F. J. Brennan Catholic High School
- Holy Names High School
- St. Anne Catholic High School
- St. Joseph's Catholic High School
- St. Michael's Alternative High School
- St. Thomas of Villanova Catholic Secondary School

=== Middle Schools ===
- Assumption College Middle School
- Corpus Christi Middle School
- Cardinal Carter Middle School

=== Elementary Schools ===
- Christ the King
- H.J. Lassaline
- Holy Cross
- Holy Name
- Immaculate Conception
- L.A. Desmarais
- Notre Dame
- Our Lady of Mount Carmel
- Our Lady of Perpetual Help
- Our Lady of the Annunciation
- Sacred Heart
- St. André (French Immersion)
- St. Angela
- St. Anne (French Immersion)
- St. Anthony
- St. Christopher
- St. Gabriel
- St. James
- St. John the Baptist
- St. John de Brebeuf
- St. John the Evangelist
- St. John Vianney
- St. Joseph
- St. Louis
- St. Mary
- St. Peter
- St. Pius X
- St. Rose
- St. Teresa of Calcutta
- St. William
- Stella Maris
- W.J. Langlois

== Provincial Supervision ==
Citing financial, labour and organizational issues, the Ontario Ministry of Education appointed a Supervisor (similar to the Emergency Managers in the State of Michigan) to help the struggling school system with its fiscal and organizational problems. The Windsor Essex Catholic District School Board has been in financial disarray for years. It is currently the only school board in Ontario to have an accumulated deficit. And, according to the province, has repeatedly failed to present a balanced budget, which is a violation of the Education Act. The Government of Ontario appointed a supervisor to oversee the financial management and administration of the Windsor-Essex Catholic District School Board for an indefinite period of time. The province made the move just hours after a report by an independent auditor made the recommendation. According to the Ministry of Education, the supervisor will return the board to fiscal sustainability, ensure there are no labour disruptions in the coming year and to put the best interests of students first. Norbert Hartmann has been appointed under the Education Act, effective Sept. 4, 2012. Ontario Education Minister Laurel Broten said immediately after the appointment that Hartmann's appointment is open ended and that Hartmann will stay as long as needed.

=== Since Supervision ===
On November 28, 2013, Ontario's education minister lifted the provincial supervision after the board eliminated its deficit and posted a surplus of $5.4 million. A majority of the savings that contributed to the board eliminating its surplus was the result of removing post-retirement benefits, which according to Mario Iatonna, the board's business manager at the time, saved $4.7 million. An enrolment of an additional 58 students to the projected enrolment brought in $500,000 to help eliminate the deficit as well. While the supervision was lifted, the ministry mentioned they would "continue to work with the board to ensure “it stays on track” to eliminate the capital budget deficit by 2017".

== See also ==
- Greater Essex County District School Board
- Conseil scolaire catholique Providence
- List of school districts in Ontario
- List of high schools in Ontario
