= Leamington District Secondary School =

Coordinates: 42.0519°N 82.6077°W

Location
- 80 Oak Street West. Leamington, Ontario, N8H 2B3; Canada

Information
- School type: Public High School
- Founded: 1953
- School board: Greater Essex County District School Board
- Superintendent: Josh Canty
- Principal: Tony Omar
- Grades: 9 to 12
- Enrolment: 980 (2018)
- Language: English
- Colours: Burgundy, Gold
- Slogan: The Pride of Leamington!
- Mascot: Snoil the Lion
- Team name: Leamington Lions
- Website: Official website

Leamington District Secondary School (LDSS) is a public high school in Leamington, Ontario. Home of the Lions, it has an enrollment of approximately 950 students. In 2018 LDSS became an IB World School authorized to offer the Diploma Programme. LDSS feeder schools are located throughout Leamington and neighbouring town Wheatley, Ontario. This includes: Queen Elizabeth Public School, Gore Hill Public School, Margaret D. Bennie Public School, Mt. Carmel-Blytheswood Public School and East Mersea Public School.

== Facility ==
Located at 80 Oak Street West, Leamington Ontario, Canada, Leamington District Secondary School is minutes away from the downtown core, and the Leamington Kinsmen Recreation Complex (formerly the Sherk Centre).

The construction of the new Leamington District Secondary School was started on May 25, 2016, with a completion date of September 2017. The old LDSS was closed upon completion of the new school which opened on September 5, 2017.

The new school replaced the former high school which was built in 1953. The school expanded with additions in 1958 and 1961.

The original High School was built in 1923.

== Athletics ==
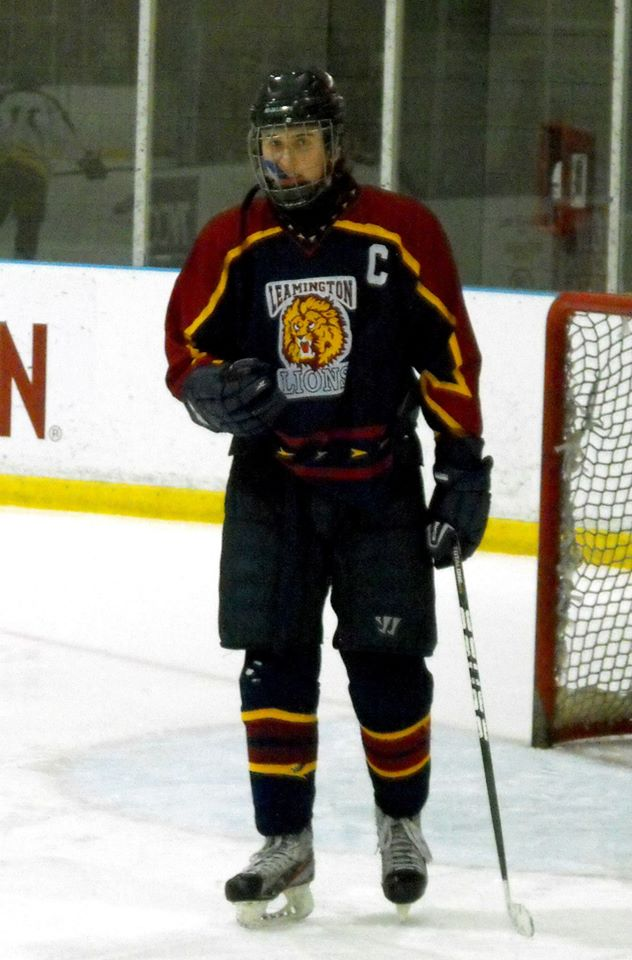
Lions player in 2014.

LDSS competes in the Windsor & Essex County Secondary School Athletic Association (WECSSA) athletic division and offers a variety of sports opportunities including boys and girls volleyball, basketball, hockey, and soccer, boys baseball, and girls softball, as well as cross country, tennis, badminton, golf, and swimming. The school mascot is a lion named Snoil, who is often seen at school events. The school's most prominent rival is Leamington's second high school Cardinal Carter Catholic High School.

== Notable alumni ==
- Darren McCarty
- David Suzuki
- Nino Ricci

== See also ==
- Education in Ontario
- List of secondary schools in Ontario
