= Murray–Wright High School =

Defunct high school in Detroit, Michigan

Coordinates: 42.3495°N 83.0839°W

Phillip J. Murray-Wright High School

Location
- 2001 West Warren Avenue; Detroit, Michigan

Information
- School type: public school
- School district: Detroit Public Schools
- Principal: Mrs. Sharon Robinson
- Grades: 9-12
- Enrollment: 1,204
- Language: English
- Area: Urban
- Colors: Blue and Gold
- Mascot: Pilots

Philip J. Murray–Wright High School was a secondary school in the Woodbridge neighborhood of Detroit, Michigan, United States. It was operated by Detroit Public Schools.

The school served Downtown Detroit, Midtown Detroit, and a portion of New Center. Currently the Douglass Academy for Young Men occupies the former Murray–Wright site. As of the 2023-2024 school year, the building became Detroit Lions Academy, the alternative campus for DPSCD. It resulted as a merger between Eastside Detroit Lions Academy, Westside School of Technology, and Legacy Academy. Each of the alternative schools still maintains their own “promise” to Detroit Youth. Eastside Detroit Lions promoted a middle school program for students who were behind in middle school credits; Westside offered a credit recovery and expedited high school experience for high schoolers over the age of sixteen; Legacy Academy offered a program to help students who were previously expelled to re-enter DPSCD after the successful completion of their time in Legacy.

== History and controversies ==
Philip Murray Senior High School opened in 1963 as an all-girls school. In 1967, it was merged with nearby all-boys Wilbur Wright High School (which opened in 1928 and closed in 2005) to create Murray–Wright.

The Detroit School Board selected the site for the school in its September 6, 1959, board meeting. The board named the school after Philip J. Murray, a labor leader, in January 1960. A dedication ceremony occurred on November 23, 1965. It was previously Philip Murray Senior High School.

In 1969, a group of around 20 students demanded the removal of principal Lucy Duck, who was a White American. The students threatened to forcibly close the school if their demand was not met. Most of the students were members of the Association of Black Students.

In February 1970, about 120 U.S. history students from Centennial High School in Windsor, Ontario visited Murray–Wright. In April 1970, 85 black students from Murray–Wright visited Centennial for a day to discuss whether they preferred nonviolent or violent methods of achieving racial equality.

On November 30, 1970, a 17-year-old student received stab injuries in a cafeteria, and was in serious condition at the Detroit Receiving Hospital. Two 16-year-olds were arrested.

On February 12, 1976, about six intruders, who according to police looked like junior high students or younger, entered Murray–Wright. According to the police, they were searching for a student who had "stolen one of their girlfriends." Two teachers discovered the intruders and asked them to leave. A security guard escorted the intruders down a hallway as about six Murray–Wright students followed the intruders as they were leaving. Outside of the door to the school, two of the intruders brandished guns and fired into the group, shooting and injuring five students. One of the injured was treated and released and the others were treated at Henry Ford Hospital.

In 1981, the school planned to show about 200 students an educational film; they were junior and senior level students of teachers who were administering standardized tests to sophomore students. The school inadvertently screened The Howling, an R-rated horror movie. Most of the students were under the age of 18.

As a result of the University of Michigan basketball scandal, Murray–Wright forfeited its entire 1994–95 season. This corresponds with Robert Traylor's senior year.

In 2004, the school had about 1,500 students. On Monday February 9, during that year, vandals attacked the school, damaging computer equipment, breaking windows, and causing other destruction. In October of that year, after a pep rally went out of control, police detained six juveniles and arrested six adults.

=== Violent incidents in the 1980s ===
In 1987, James Risen of the Los Angeles Times said "Murray–Wright had become one of the most violent schools in the city."

On October 18, 1985, during homecoming celebrations, four teenagers entered the football field in an automobile, two minutes before halftime during the Public School League game between Murray–Wright and Northwestern High School. When the car pulled behind the grandstands, one teenager fired on a crowd of 300 people with a shotgun, causing seven people to receive injuries. Six of the injured were teenagers, ranged in age from 13 to 19. One received critical injuries. All six received treatment at the Detroit Receiving Hospital. The shootings occurred at 4:15 PM, and the suspects left the scene. This shooting was the week's second shooting that had high school students involved. The shooting was the second one in a month in which homecoming activities were involved. Police said that one of the suspects had been involved in a fight on an earlier occasion.

On April 16, 1987, a student at Murray–Wright entered the school parking lot and shot 17-year-old Chester Jackson, a junior running back, in the head, killing him. The attacker went into the gymnasium and shot 18-year-old Damon Matthews, a basketball player, in the face. Tomeka Turner, an 18-year-old, was wounded. Risen said that Turner's injuries occurred "apparently in the school's corridors as the attacker fled the building." The youth with facial injuries received treatment at the Detroit Receiving Hospital. The incident occurred around noon. The attacker, Michael Schofield, was 14 at the time of the crime. Schofield, 15 years old at sentencing, was sentenced to serve in a juvenile correctional facility until he turned 19. Schofield killed four people on September 11, 2003, during an attempted robbery of a convenience store in Westland, Michigan, and then killed himself. His co-defendant Leslie Gordon was sentenced to life without parole for the crime. The Los Angeles Times News Service said that the 1987 Murray–Wright shooting was the incident that put "most clearly into focus" the epidemic of youth violence in Detroit.

After the murder and shootings, school officials started a plan to reduce violence in the school. The school was closed for two days as officials held special assemblies concerning school violence. The school officials said that of the students who appeared at the assemblies at Murray–Wright, half appeared with their parents. This occurred despite fears that few parents would appear.

== Athletics ==
In 1991, Murray–Wright's girls' basketball team was ranked No. 1 in Class A of the Michigan High School Athletic Association. During that year Detroit Public Schools agreed to remove the school team from the tournament because one player was omitted from an eligibility list and the Associated Press said that a backup list "allegedly" was not approved. Wayne County Circuit Judge Kathleen MacDonald upheld the decision, saying that she had no authority to reverse the decision of DPS withdrawing one of its own schools.

Murray Wright earned a first time PSL City Championship and a District Championship in 2005 led by Dominique Douglass who was inducted into the high school hall of fame

== Notable alumni ==
- Rosalind Ashford (1961), member of Motown singing group Martha and the Vandellas and Rock and Roll Hall of Fame inductee
- Johnny Davis (1973), former NBA player and former coach of the Memphis Grizzlies
- Hal Newhouser (1939), former MLB player with the Detroit Tigers and MLB Hall of Famer
- Robert Traylor (1995), former NBA player
- Terrence Watson (born 1987), American-Israeli basketball player for Hapoel Eilat of the Israeli Premier League
