= Dakoda Shepley =

Canadian gridiron football player (born 1994)

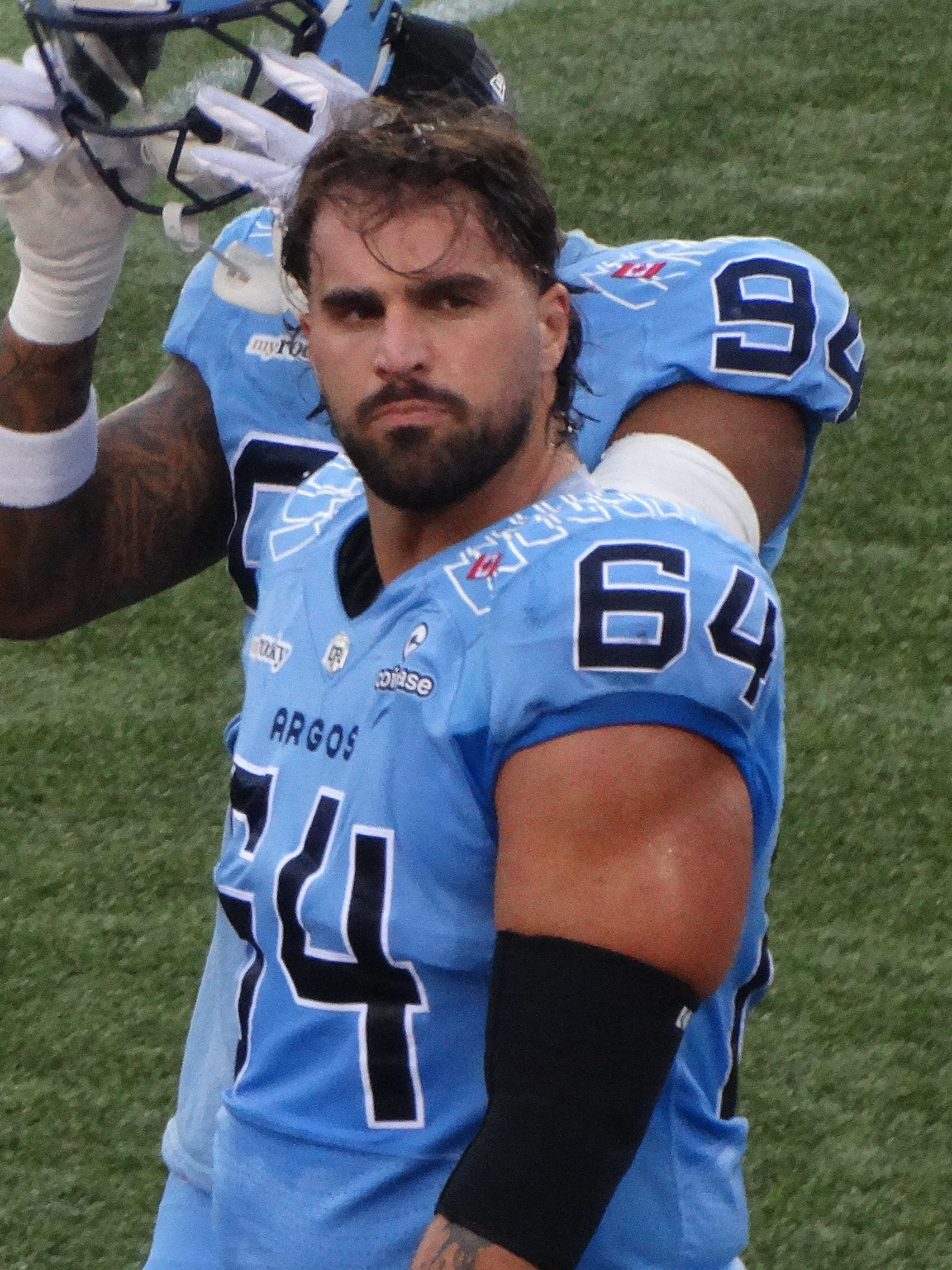
- Shepley with the Toronto Argonauts in 2026

Profile
- Position: Offensive tackle

Personal information
- Born: December 27, 1994 (age 31); Windsor, Ontario, Canada
- Listed height: 6 ft 4 in (1.93 m)
- Listed weight: 306 lb (139 kg)

Career information
- High school: Holy Names (Windsor)
- University: British Columbia (2013–2017)
- NFL draft: 2018: undrafted
- CFL draft: 2018: 1st round, 5th overall pick

Career history
- New York Jets (2018)*; Saskatchewan Roughriders (2019); San Francisco 49ers (2020); Seattle Seahawks (2021); Dallas Cowboys (2022); Indianapolis Colts (2023)*; Dallas Cowboys (2023–2025); Toronto Argonauts (2026)
- * Offseason or practice squad member only

Career NFL statistics
- Games played: 16
- Stats at Pro Football Reference

Career CFL statistics
- Games played: 34
- Stats at CFL.ca

Dakoda Shepley (born December 27, 1994) is a Canadian former professional football offensive lineman. He played university football for the UBC Thunderbirds.

== Early life ==
Shepley attended Holy Names High School in Windsor, Ontario. His main sport was ice hockey and didn't start playing football until suffering a broken hand during his sophomore season.

He enrolled at the University of British Columbia where he played for the Thunderbirds. He was redshirted in 2013. He was a four-year starter, playing right tackle and right guard. As a sophomore, he contributed to the team winning the Vanier Cup championship in 2015. As a senior, he was named a Canada West All-star at right tackle.

== Professional career ==
Pre-draft measurables
| Height | Weight | Arm length | Hand span | Wingspan | 40-yard dash | 10-yard split | 20-yard split | 20-yard shuttle | Three-cone drill | Vertical jump | Broad jump | Bench press | Wonderlic |
|---|---|---|---|---|---|---|---|---|---|---|---|---|---|
| 6 ft 4 3/8 in (1.94 m) | 305 lb (138 kg) | 32 in (0.81 m) | 10 in (0.25 m) | 6 ft 5 1/2 in (1.97 m) | 5.17 s | 1.75 s | 2.84 s | 4.70 s | 8.01 s | 32.5 in (0.83 m) | 9 ft 3 in (2.82 m) | 30 reps | 30 |
All values from CFL Combine/Pro Day

=== New York Jets ===
Shepley was signed as an undrafted free agent by the New York Jets after the 2018 NFL draft on May 4. He attended training camp and played three preseason games with the Jets before being released on August 31, 2018.

=== Saskatchewan Roughriders ===
Despite being signed by the New York Jets a week earlier, the Saskatchewan Roughriders of the Canadian Football League (CFL) selected Shepley with the fifth overall pick in the 2018 CFL draft. Shepley signed a two-year deal with the Roughriders in March 2019. Shepley made his CFL debut on June 13, 2019, against the Hamilton Tiger-Cats and started 14 games as a rookie. He was the unanimous selection for Saskatchewan Roughriders Most Outstanding Rookie.

After the CFL canceled the 2020 season due to the COVID-19 pandemic, Shepley chose to opt-out of his contract with the Roughriders on August 25, 2020.

=== San Francisco 49ers ===
On August 29, 2020, Shepley signed with the San Francisco 49ers of the NFL. He was waived by San Francisco on September 5, and was re–signed to the practice squad the next day. Shepley was elevated to the active roster on December 12 and December 19, for the team's Weeks 14 and 15 games against the Washington Football Team and Dallas Cowboys, and reverted to the practice squad after each game. He signed a reserve/future contract with the 49ers on January 4, 2021.

On August 31, 2021, the 49ers waived Shepley as a part of final roster cuts.

=== Seattle Seahawks ===
On September 1, 2021, the Seattle Seahawks claimed Shepley off waivers. Shepley played in 8 games during the regular season, blocking on the extra point unit. On August 31, 2022, the Seahawks waived Shepley as part of final roster cut downs.

=== Dallas Cowboys (first stint) ===
On September 1, 2022, the Cowboys signed Shepley to their practice squad. He was promoted to the active roster on January 7, 2023, then waived two days later.

=== Indianapolis Colts ===
On January 10, 2023, Shepley was claimed off waivers by the Indianapolis Colts. He was waived on August 29, 2023, and re-signed to the practice squad on September 21. He was released on October 17.

=== Dallas Cowboys (second stint) ===
On October 31, 2023, Shepley was signed to the Cowboys practice squad. He signed a reserve/future contract on January 16, 2024.

Shepley was released by the Cowboys on August 27, 2024, and re-signed to the practice squad. He re-joined the Cowboys for the 2025 season, but was waived with an injury designation on August 8, 2025.

=== Toronto Argonauts ===
On January 27, 2026, it was announced that Shepley had signed with the Toronto Argonauts.

=== Retirement ===
On November 1, 2026, Shepley announced his retirement following the Argonauts 22-25 loss to the Winnipeg Blue Bombers in the Division semi-finals.

== Personal life ==
Shepley portrayed Omega Red in Deadpool 2. He also was a stunt and body double in Game Over, Man!
