= Holy Names High School (Windsor, Ontario) =

Coordinates: 42.27758°N 83.03371°W

Location
- 1400 Northwood Street; Windsor, Ontario, N9E 1A4; Canada

Information
- Motto: Aliis Non Sibi (For Others, Not Oneself)
- Founded: September 12, 1985
- School district: Windsor Essex Catholic District School Board
- Principal: Kyle Cowan
- Grades: 9–12
- Enrollment: 1,150 (2023)
- Mascot: The Knights
- Feeder schools: Christ the King; Notre Dame; Our Lady of Mount Carmel; St. Christopher; St. Gabriel
- Website: www.wecdsb.on.ca/100

Holy Names High School (often abbreviated HNH), is a Catholic secondary school located in Windsor, Ontario, Canada. It belongs to the Windsor-Essex Catholic District School Board. It serves students from grades 9 to 12.

== History ==
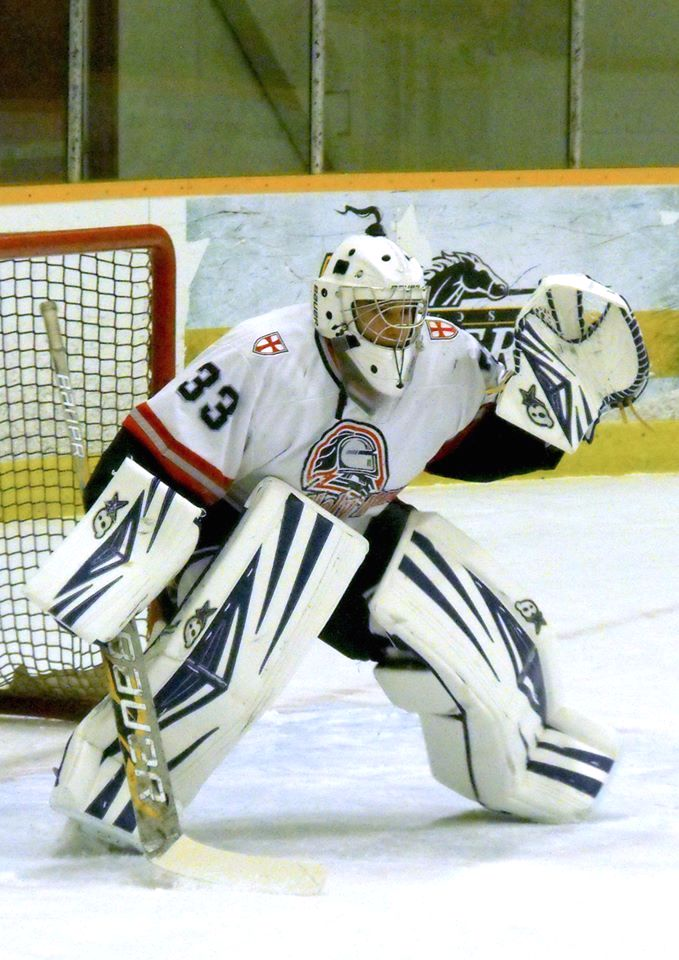
Knights goalie in 2014.

The school opened on September 12, 1985, in the former St. Hubert Elementary School. The school was named to remember the contributions of the Sisters of the Holy Names of Jesus and Mary. In September 1986 the school was moved to its current location, the former Centennial Secondary School. As of that month it had 36 teachers and 510 students in grades 9 and 10; it would later introduce grades 11 and 12. The dedication was scheduled for September 18, 1986.

In the 2017–2018 school year, the school began a STEM (Science, Technology, Engineering, Math) program. The program was designed to get more students interested in the STEM subjects and to fill similar type jobs by introducing more STEM subjects and embedding them into the existing curriculum. Students who complete four years of the STEM program will be awarded with a specialized certificate. $600,000 was invested to redesign six science labs along with another $1.8 million to construct an artificial turf field and six-lane track.

The Boys Football Team achieved back to back OFSAA championships, winning the Western Bowl in 2017 and the Northern Bowl in 2018.

In 2011, former Holy Names teacher Father William Hodgson Marshall pled guilty to sexually abusing students during his time at the school. Starting in 1952, Marshall sexually abused students at various Catholic high schools in Windsor, Sudbury and Toronto, with his last known act occurring in 1986.

In 2022, the Senior Boys Soccer Team placed second at AAA OFSAA in London, Ontario. This resulted in a silver medal and one of the most successful seasons in the school's history. After going undefeated all season leading up to the Provincial Final, the Knights picked up two gold medals as well as the OFSAA silver medal.

== Notable alumni ==
- Brett Bellemore – former NHL player of the Carolina Hurricanes
- Scott D'Amore – professional wrestler, trainer, manager, promoter and agent
- Eddie Francis – former mayor of Windsor
- Fred Francis – mayor of Windsor
- Theo Johnson – football tight end
- Michael Leighton – former NHL player of the Chicago Blackhawks, Nashville Predators, Philadelphia Flyers, and Carolina Hurricanes
- Matt Morencie – former CFL player of the Winnipeg Blue Bombers
- Jordan Nolan – AHL player of the San Antonio Rampage, signed with St. Louis Blues
- Rob Raco – Actor
- Dakoda Shepley – football player and actor
- D. J. Smith – head coach of the Ottawa Senators
- Jason Spezza – NHL player of the Toronto Maple Leafs
- Daniel Victor – singer/songwriter of Neverending White Lights
- Tessa Virtue – 2010 and 2018 Winter Olympics, Ice Dance gold medallist

== See also ==
- Education in Ontario
- List of secondary schools in Ontario
