= General Amherst High School =

Location
- 130 Sandwich Street; Amherstburg, Ontario, N9V 1Z8; Canada; 42.106744°N 83.11103°W

Information
- Motto: lux sit
- Founded: 1922
- School board: Greater Essex County District School Board
- Superintendent: Sharon Pyke
- Principal: Melissa DeBruyne
- Vice Principal: Bonnie Desjardins
- Senior Secretary: Sandi Holden
- Grades: 9 through 12
- Enrollment: 645 (2019/2020)
- Language: English
- Area: Amherstburg and southwestern Essex County
- Colours: Black and Gold
- Mascot: Jeffery the Bulldog
- Team name: Bulldogs
- Website: www.publicboard.ca/school/gahs/Pages/

General Amherst High School was a high school in the southwestern Ontario town of Amherstburg. GAHS feeder schools were Amherstburg Public School, Anderdon Public School and Malden Central Public School.

== Reputation ==
General Amherst High School was the home of the Bulldogs, which became the school's official mascot in 1994 (they were previously known as the Generals). GAHS has been recognized for a number of causes, including (but not limited to): the Canadian record of per capita student contributions in donations to the Canadian Cancer Society, championships in football, hockey, basketball, track & field, wrestling, tennis, cross country and volleyball; the recipient of several Essex County "Student Prime Minister of the Year" awards (2004, 2005, & 2009) and high rankings in the University of Waterloo Fermat Mathematics competition. General Amherst High School was considered to be one of the more reputable all-around secondary schools in the Windsor/Essex County region; in a 2007 survey of Ontario schools based on academic and all-around performance, General Amherst ranked 29th out of 664.

== History ==
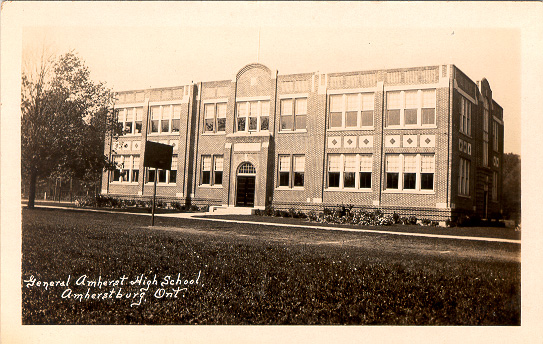
General Amherst High School (circa 1922) Amherstburg, Ontario

The school was named after Jeffery Amherst, who was commander of the British armed forces in North America during the Seven Years' War, then served as the first British Governor General in the territories that eventually became Canada. The school's construction began in 1921, and completed in 1922. Previously, students in the Amherstburg area who wanted to continue their education past elementary school had to go to the town of Essex, where they were required to pay room and board during the school term.

Although many additions were added to the building in 1953, 1960, 1963 and 1965, the original building can still be seen facing south toward Bill Wigle Park.

The following have been Principals of General Amherst High School since 1922, the year it opened:

- 1922 to 1926 – Mr. Norman Davies
- 1926 to 1960 – Mr. Walter K. Sidey
- 1960 to 1962 – Mr. A. A. Martin
- 1962 to 1969 – Mr. Reg Cozens
- 1969 to 1987 – Mr. Jack Wilson
- 1987 to 1989 – Mr. Cliff Pattison
- 1989 to 1991 – Mr. Rod Paulin
- 1991 to 1996 – Mr. Reg Simpson
- 1996 to 1998 – Mr. John Corbett
- 1998 to 2002 – Mr. Tom Halliwill
- 2002 to 2009 – Mr. Patrick Catton
- 2009 to 2012 – Mrs. Mary Edwards
- 2012 to 2017 – Ms. Hazel Keefner
- 2017 to 2022 – Ms. Melissa DeBruyne

== Athletics ==
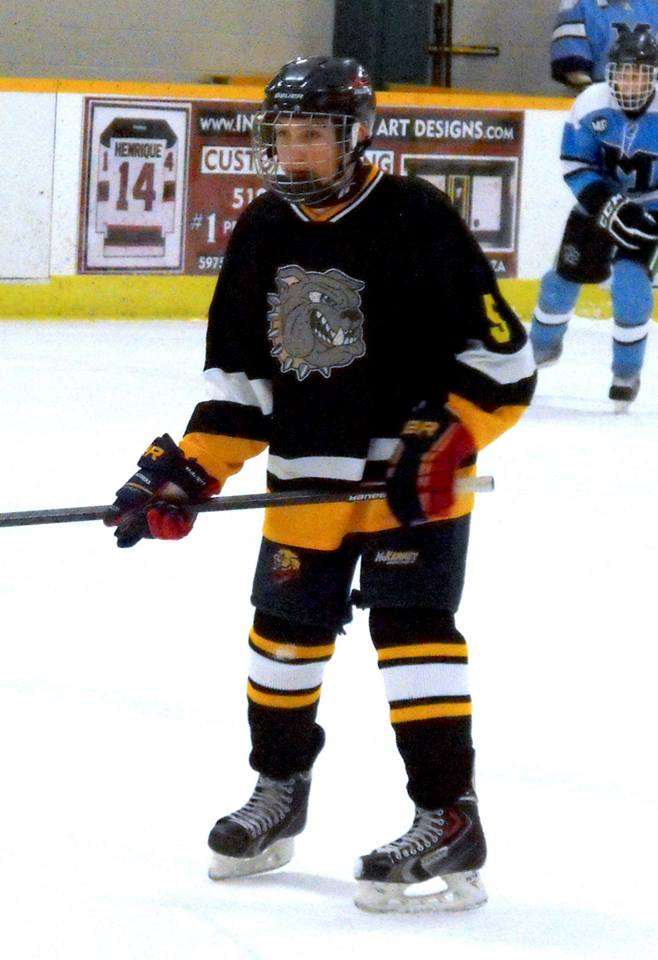
Bulldogs player during 2014–15 season.

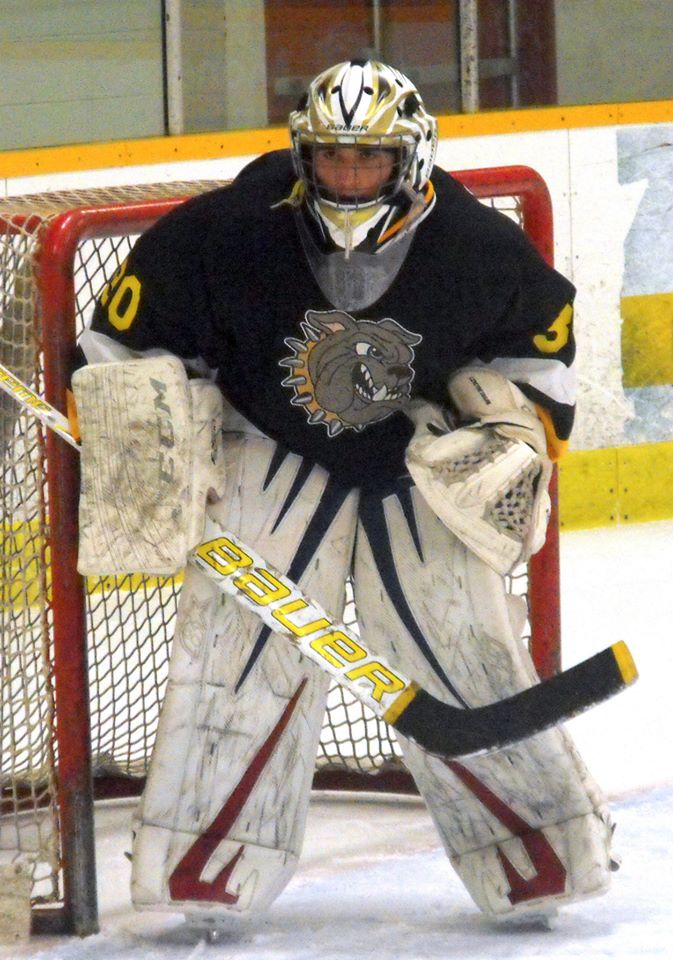
Bulldogs goalie during 2014–15 season.

Since its inception, General Amherst had a reputation as a powerhouse for its athletics program. Most notably, the Sr. Girls Basketball team has broken numerous Ontario records, including the capture of 9 consecutive OFSAA medals (as of 2012) led by longtime coach Dom Silvaggio. The Lady Gens captured their 10th straight WECSSAA title on November 9, 2012 followed by their 9th straight SWOSSAA title on November 20, 2012. The team was defeated by St. Catharines St. Francis in the 2012 OFSAA championship game, missing out on back-to-back gold medals by 2 points.

The Senior Girls Volleyball team emerged as a provincial power over the last 15 years. The team captured 7 OFSAA medals between 2006 and 2020 with 3 OFSAA "AA" Gold Medal/Championships in 2006, 2009 and 2010. Silver in 2008 and 2013. Bronze in 2007 and Antique Bronze in 2020. The program won 11 of the last 14 WECSSAA AA Championships under coach Jeff Miller.

The Senior Boys Football team captured two straight OFSAA West Bowl Championships in 2 years (2006 & 2007), while the school also took home OFSAA gold medal in Men's Hockey (2003). In the spring of 2009, the Girls Softball team captured the Provincial Championship for the first time in school history.

The school offered a wide variety of sports teams that compete against other GECDSB high schools within the WECSSAA classification. The competitive teams at Amherst include:

- Basketball
- Volleyball
- Football
- Baseball/Softball
- Hockey
- Soccer
- Badminton
- Curling
- Cross Country
- Track and Field
- Wrestling
- Gymnastics
- Golf
- Tennis
- Swimming

== Student Council ==
General Amherst was known throughout Ontario for its strong leadership and Student Council activities. The structure upon which the student parliament and its constitution were organized has been used as a model for other area secondary schools in the region for over two decades. The following is a table of the student council's Prime Ministers and Deputy Prime Ministers since the 1993–1994 school year:

School Year	Prime Minister	Deputy PM
2021-2022	Emily Richard	Evon Brockett
2020-2021	Abbie Drouillard	Halle Coulson
2019-2020	Cassidy Zelle	Ethan Richard
2018-2019	Jordan Wingerdan	Cassidy Zelle
2017-2018	Linden Crain	Tate Levesque
2016-2017	Ruben Tar	Miya Taylor
2015-2016	Dani Leroux	Darby Roland
2014-2015	Trent Sparling	Michael Andrews
2013-2014	Linsey (Mee Jeong) Lim	Hayley Bartlam
2012-2013	Michael West	Alex Leroux
2011-2012	Scott Sanger	Nick Jones
2010-2011	Katherine Deluca	Meaghan Marton
2009-2010	Blair Connelly	Katherine Deluca
2008-2009	Sean Robinson*	Brett Hedges
2007-2008	Chris Janssen	Evan Barnes
2006-2007	Camille Dipaolo	Daniella Danese
2005-2006	Justin Mackie	Derek Renaud**
2004-2005	Robert Ouellette*	Kurt Kraler
2003-2004	Charlie Simpkins*	Wes Ewer
2002-2003	Lindsay Thrasher	Melissa Danese
2001-2002	Dave W. Ouellette	Victor Kielbasa
2000-2001	Dave W. Ouellette	(none)
1999-2000	Natasha DiNardo	Peter Bortignon
1998-1999	Adam Bramburger	Jennifer Wilson
1997-1998	Krista Sampson	Melissa DiCarlo
1996-1997	Andria Del Rizzo	Adam Bramburger
1995-1996	Stacey Grant	Andria Del Rizzo
1994-1995	Dave Brewin	Adam Dukelow
1993-1994	Adam Dukelow	Dave Brewin

(*) denotes recipient of GECDSB Prime Minister of the Year award
(**) denotes recipient of GECDSB Deputy Prime Minister of the Year award

== Closure and replacement ==
In October 2016 the Ministry of Education awarded a $24.3 million grant for the construction of a new Amherstburg High School, to consolidate the General Amherst High School and Western Secondary School communities. The site of the new school is at the south end of Centennial Park off Simcoe Street between Fryer Street and Victoria Street South, which was sold to the school board from the Town of Amherstburg in January 2018. Construction began in October 2020 and was completed in September 2022. The name of the new school is North Star High School.

== See also ==
- List of high schools in Ontario
