= Essex District High School =

Location
- 244 Talbot Street North; Essex, Ontario, N8M 2E1; Canada

Information
- School type: Public high school
- Motto: "We Make a Difference"
- Founded: 1885
- School board: Greater Essex County District School Board
- Superintendent: Josh Canty
- Principal: Bonnie Desjardins
- Vice Principal: K. Ryan
- Grades: 9 to 12
- Enrollment: 650 (2025-2026)
- Language: English
- Colours: Red, Black, and White
- Mascot: Raider Man and Raider Woman
- Team name: Red Raiders
- Website: Essex District High School

Essex District High School is a public secondary school in Essex, in the centre of Essex County, Ontario. The school was founded in 1885 and is the oldest operating publicly funded high school in the province. The school has a student population of 650 and 78 faculty members. EDHS feeder schools are Essex Public School, Colchester North Public School and Gosfield North Public Schools.

== History ==
In 1885, Dr. James Brien proposed and received strong support for the establishment of a new high school in Essex Centre. On March 14, 1885, the first meeting of the school board took place at Peck's Hall led by James Naylor as chairman; and J.S. Laird, S.G. Thomas, C.E. Jones, John Milne, and W.H. Russell.

Classes started on August 31 in the old church behind the railroad station on Medora Avenue, which had been used by the Methodist Episcopal Church. There were 18 students and two teachers in the first year.

Captain Albert Jones offered part of Lot 284 consisting of 3 1/4 acres of his land for the building site for the new school which cost approximately $10,000 (over $380,000 at the time). It was a two-storey red brick structure measuring 64' × 67', with three classrooms on both floors, a basement, and an attic all heated with wood stoves. Essex High School officially opened in 1888, accommodating 200 students.

In 1889, the Lyceum, a Literary Society was organized and the Argus (the first school magazine) began. Since attendance reached 59 students, a third teacher was hired. High School Cadets were first organized in 1898. By 1904, Essex High School was highly acclaimed for its well equipped gym. In 1920, an addition to the school costing around $5,000 was built and there were six teachers on staff.

A fire on Tuesday, February 14, 1921, destroyed the school. All that was saved were the guns and uniforms of the cadets. All records, science and chemistry apparati, and books were burned.

Essex Free Press article, February 18, 1921

"The fire had started about 7:45 in the old furnace room. The Janitor had reported that he had gone to the school and filled the furnace with coal, banking it up well and leaving about 7:15 p.m. About 7:45 p.m. his wife called his attention to a light in the school building and he hurried over to same. On opening the furnace room door, the smoke poured out so dense he could not enter, whereupon he ran to the front door, intending to use the phone and turn in a fire alarm. The smoke was also so thick in that section that he feared to go in so went over to J. Baldwin and phoned the waterworks. The alarm was given and in a few minutes the fire brigade were on the scene, but the fire had gained such headway that their efforts were of no avail."

The building was only a brick veneer. The practice at that time was to oil the wood floors, and so the fire that started in the furnace room spread quickly. The school was destroyed in only an hour's time.

People came from all over the county to see the remains of the school. In fact, the Electric railway ran a car from Kingsville to Essex, so that Kingsville residents could see the ruins. Since Essex High School had been the first school built outside of Windsor, many came from as far away as Leamington.

The Monday following the fire, Orange Hall (the basement of the Library) and one classroom at the public school were used to continue classes for its 160 students. Orange Hall also served as the Presbyterian Sunday School. Despite inconveniences, education continued in this state until the new school was built. The new school was built at a cost of $85,000. It was formally opened by the Warden of the County on September 5, 1922.

Construction began on a new high school in June 2012 and was completed over four separate phases to allow the school to remain open. Construction was completed in July 2015 at a cost of over $18,500,000. A portion of the original façade still stands along the southeast corner of the building facing Talbot St. North. This portion of the building is a part of the Essex Recreation Complex which was not included in the construction project.

== Academics ==
Essex District High School offers the following number of courses in these categories:

- Fine Arts - 16
- Business Studies - 10
- Canadian and World Studies - 16
- Computer and Information Science - 8
- English - 12
- French - 5
- Health and Physical Education - 19
- Mathematics - 15
- Native Studies - 1
- Science - 15
- Social Sciences and Humanities - 10
- Technological Education - 16

== Feeder Schools ==
Students from the following schools usually attend Essex District High School due to local district boundaries.

- Essex Public School
- Gosfield North Central School
- Colchester North Public School

== Athletics ==
Essex District High School has 26 sports teams. They all share the same name: The "Essex Red Raiders." The school mascots are Raider Man and Raider Woman. The Red Raiders compete in the AA category of the South Western Ontario Secondary Schools Athletic Association (SWOSSAA) which is a division of the Ontario Federation of School Athletic Associations (OFSAA).

The Red Raiders boys hockey team were OFSAA champions in 2002 and 2003.

== Notable alumni ==
- Scott Burnside, journalist and sportswriter
- Leo "Ted" Coneybeare, creator and producer of Polka Dot Door
- Nate Binder, former CFL player with Edmonton Eskimos
- Audrey McLaughlin, former leader of the New Democratic Party (1989–1995)
- Brandon Revenberg, CFL player with the Hamilton Tiger-Cats
- Ed Philion, former CFL and NFL player and coach

== See also ==
- Education in Ontario
- List of secondary schools in Ontario
