= Belle River District High School =

Coordinates: 42.2885°N 82.7111°W

Location
- 333 South Street; Lakeshore, Ontario, N0R 1A0; Canada

Information
- School type: Public High School
- Founded: 1947
- School board: Greater Essex County District School Board
- Superintendent: Joe Bell
- Principal: Theresa Williams
- Vice Principal: Greg Levack
- Grades: 9 to 12
- Language: English
- Colours: Green and White
- Team name: Belle River Nobles
- Website: Belle River District High School

Belle River District High School, in Belle River, Ontario is part of the Greater Essex County District School Board. Belle River DHS feeder schools include Belle River Public School, Centennial Central Public School and Lakeshore Discovery School.

== Facility ==
Located at 333 South Street, Belle River Ontario, Canada, The school was built in 1947 with numerous additions in 1953, 1957, 1963, 1966, 1973, 1975 and 1998. The building itself has two gyms, a weight room, a library, a large cafetorium, a wood shop, a metal shop, as well as a greenhouse. The site has a track and football field at the rear of the property as well as a soccer field and tennis court on the north side of the property; it has recently been the topic of local debate as the track has fallen into disrepair.

== See also ==
- Education in Ontario
- List of secondary schools in Ontario
