= Vincent Massey Secondary School =

Location
- 1800 Liberty Street; Windsor, Ontario, N9E 1J2; Canada; 42°15′36″N 83°1′42″W

Information
- School type: Public, high school
- Motto: Dum Laboramus Prosumus (As long as we are working, we are progressing)
- Founded: 1960
- School board: Greater Essex County District School Board
- Superintendent: John Howitt
- Principal: Kim Rochleau
- Grades: 9–12
- Enrollment: 2163 (September 2020)
- Language: English
- Area: South Windsor
Colour
- Mascot: Morris the Mustang
- Team name: Massey Mustangs
- Newspaper: The Stang
- Yearbook: Pegasus
- Website: Official website

Vincent Massey Secondary School, commonly known as Massey, is a public high school located in the South Windsor neighbourhood in Windsor, Ontario, Canada. The school is under the jurisdiction of the Greater Essex County District School Board, one of the four school boards in Windsor–Essex. The school was named after Vincent Massey, the first Canadian-born Governor General of Canada. Currently, the school has a population of over 2000 students.

The school offers both semestered courses. It is notable within Windsor for offering the enriched program.

== History ==
The school was opened in the fall of 1960 under the name of Vincent Massey Collegiate Institute. The school was opened under the direction of the Windsor Suburban High School Board and the Windsor Board of Education.

During the late 1960s and the early 1970s, Morris the Mustang, the school's mascot, would be paraded around South Windsor's Norfolk Street to celebrate the commencement of the football season.

In 1984, Vincent Massey became a magnet school for its enrichment programs in Mathematics, Science, English and French.

By the 1980s, the demographics of South Windsor changed greatly and the baby boom population had moved on, leaving Massey with approximately 800 students. In September 1986, most students from Centennial Secondary School relocated to Vincent Massey after Centennial was chosen to be closed due to dwindling enrollment in both schools. Vincent Massey added Orange to its school colours in honour of Centennial, whose school colours were Black and Orange. Their sports teams were also known as the Mustangs.

In 1998, Vincent Massey became a part of the Greater Essex County District School Board after the amalgamation of the Windsor Board of Education and the Essex County Board of Education.

In 2000, Vincent Massey welcomed students from W. D. Lowe High School after it closed down in June of that year. From 2001 to 2006, Vincent Massey also admitted Grade 7 and 8 students within their own area of the school named Massey Elementary.

== Campus ==
Located in the heart of the South Windsor neighbourhood, the campus sits on approximately five acres of land. The school's front doors are located along Liberty Street, while its rear is located near Norfolk Street. The rear of the campus features an athletic field and an oval track. The building itself has two gyms, two floors, a weight room, a workout room, a library housed in a circular building, a moderately sized cafeteria, a wood shop, a metal shop, as well as several classrooms and offices for students and staff. In the spring and summer months of 2017, the cafeteria and the closed swimming pool were renovated into 6 new classrooms and a larger cafeteria to make room for the growing number of students.

== Academics ==
In the Fraser Institute's 2014 Report Card on Ontario's Secondary Schools, Vincent Massey was ranked at 48 out 740 secondary schools in Ontario in terms of academic performance. From 2009-2014, Massey ranked on average at 91 out of 691 in the Fraser Institute's report cards. As of 2022, the school now ranks at 111 out of 739 Ontario secondary schools.

Vincent Massey is one of the three schools within Windsor that offers the Advanced Placement program for senior students. The school also offers an Enriched program, which offers Science, Math, and English courses at a higher level of difficulty than traditional Ontario academic courses.

Massey has been known for its strong mathematics program and its excellent performance on University of Waterloo's CEMC-administered Pascal (9th Grade), Cayley (10th Grade), Fermat (11th grade) and Euclid (12th grade) mathematics contests. It also competes in other Canadian and American mathematics competitions, such as the American Mathematics Competitions and the American Invitational Mathematics Examination (AIME).

=== Notable teachers ===
Mathematics teacher Bruce White was one of the recipients of the 1993 Prime Minister's Awards for Teaching Excellence. The award, awarded by former Prime Minister Jean Chrétien, was presented to White by former Member of Parliament Herb Gray. White was also a recipient of the Edyth May Sliffe Award in 1993, 1999 and 2003.

Mathematics teacher Christopher Ing, who is a former Massey student as well as former pupil of Bruce White, was one of the recipients of the High School Sliffe Award in 2008. A computer science teacher, Ronald McKenzie, also received this award in 2009.

Business teacher Ross Ferrara won an award of merit from the Ontario Business Educators' Association in 2010 for promoting and increasing awareness of business studies. Ferrara was also selected by the Ontario Ministry of Education, as the high school teacher representative, to the Financial Literacy Working Group.

== Athletics ==
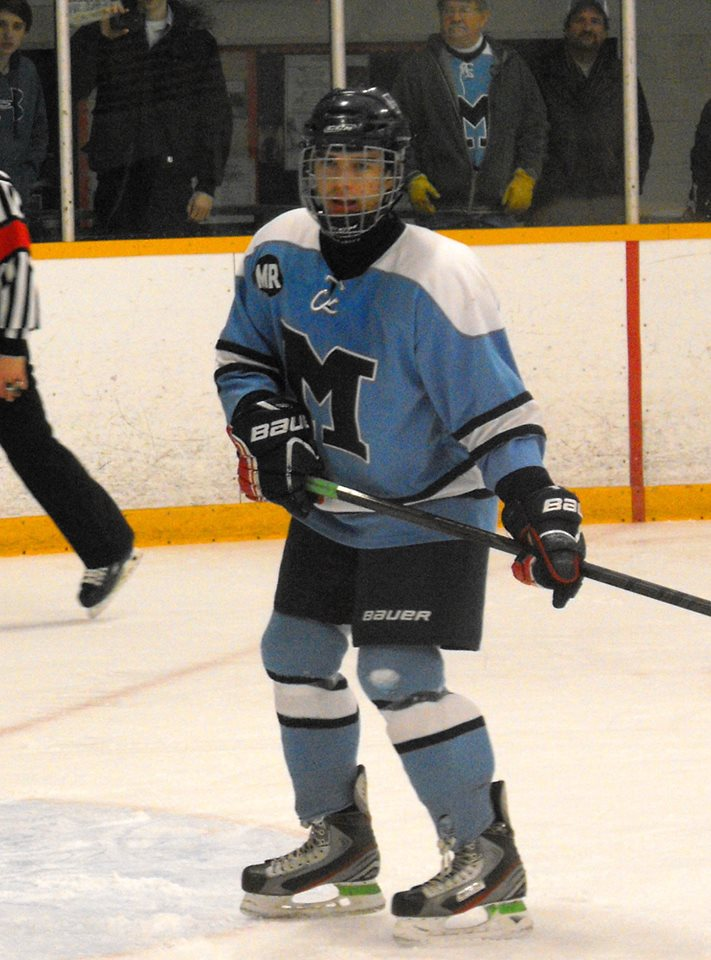
Massey boys player during 2014 playoffs

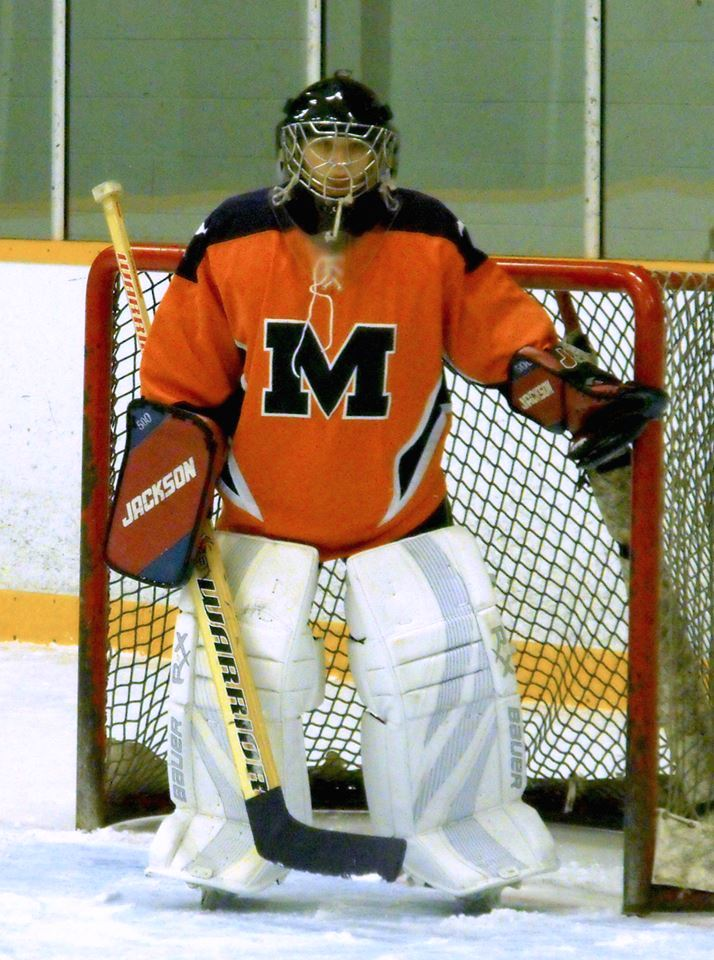
Mustangs girls goalie in 2014

Vincent Massey has always had a very strong athletics program. All of Massey's teams have received WECESSA, SWOSSA and OFSAA titles.

=== Baseball ===
The Boys Baseball Team won the 2010 OFSAA Championship, beating St. Anne 4 to 3.

=== Basketball ===
In the 1987–88 season, the Senior Boys Basketball Team went undefeated during the regular season, only to lose a playoff game later.

=== Hockey ===
In the 2015-16 season, Massey boys hockey won the Memorial Cup

=== Cross Country ===
The Senior Boys Team won the OFSAA championship every year from 2007 to 2009. In 2010, both the senior boys and senior girls teams won OFSAA, which no other school had ever done before. As of the 2015–16 season Massey has won a total of 11 consecutive WECSSAA Cross Country Championship titles.

=== Football ===
In both the 1986–87 and the 1987–88 seasons, the Senior Boys Football Team won back to back city championship in the Newman conference (the Wilson Conference was for schools of smaller enrollment). In the 1988–89 season, the Senior Boys Football Team nearly got a "three-peat" but lost the city championship in an infamous triple over-time game when they missed a last minute field goal attempt.

In 1992, the Senior Boys Football team defeated the Brennan Cardinals to capture the city championship. The team was led by Windsor Hall of Fame coach Godfrey Janisse.

The Junior Boys Football Team won the city championship in 1975, 1992, 1994 and 2004.

In the 2008–09 and 2010–11 seasons, the Senior Boys Football Team won the city championship.

The Senior Boys Football team won the Wilson Cup city championship in the 2013–14 season. Senior boys football team won 5 city championships during the 1970's.

=== Soccer ===
In the 1987–88 season, the Senior Girls Soccer Team won the city championship.,

In the 1987–88 season, the Senior Boys Soccer Team won the city and the Essex County championship, having the Brazilian exchange student Paulo Soares (nicknamed PIPO) as their international star. In the 1990–91 season, the Senior Boys Soccer Team again won the city championship in a dramatic penalty shootout against the Lowe Trojans. They later won the county championship.

=== Swimming ===
In the 1970s, Massey's swim team won many city and provincial championships.

In 2009, the Massey Swim Team ranked 3rd in the province in men's events, and came 8th overall during the provincial championships. During the OFSAA championships, Massey grabbed Gold in men's 200 Medley Relay two years in a row, and Silver in the 200 Free Relay. Massey also captured two bronze medals in 50 Freestyle and 100 backstroke.

=== Tennis ===
In 2009, the Senior Boys Tennis Team won the Open Boys' Doubles Championship. In 2015, Massey's mixed doubles team won the Open Mixed Doubles Championship.

=== Volleyball ===
In the late 1980s, the Senior Girls Volleyball Teams were very strong. In the 2010 fall–winter season, both Massey junior and senior girls volleyball teams were SWOSSAA champions. The senior girls team then competed in Toronto for OFSSAA.

== Notable alumni ==
- Jacob Robson, baseball player
- Richard Peddie, former president and CEO of Maple Leafs Sports and Entertainment
- Drew Dilkens, currently serving as mayor of Windsor, Ontario. He was elected mayor in the city's 2014 municipal election.
- John Tucker, NHL player
- Muftah Ageli, CFL player

== See also ==
- Education in Ontario
- List of secondary schools in Ontario
