= St. Joseph's Catholic High School (Windsor, Ontario) =

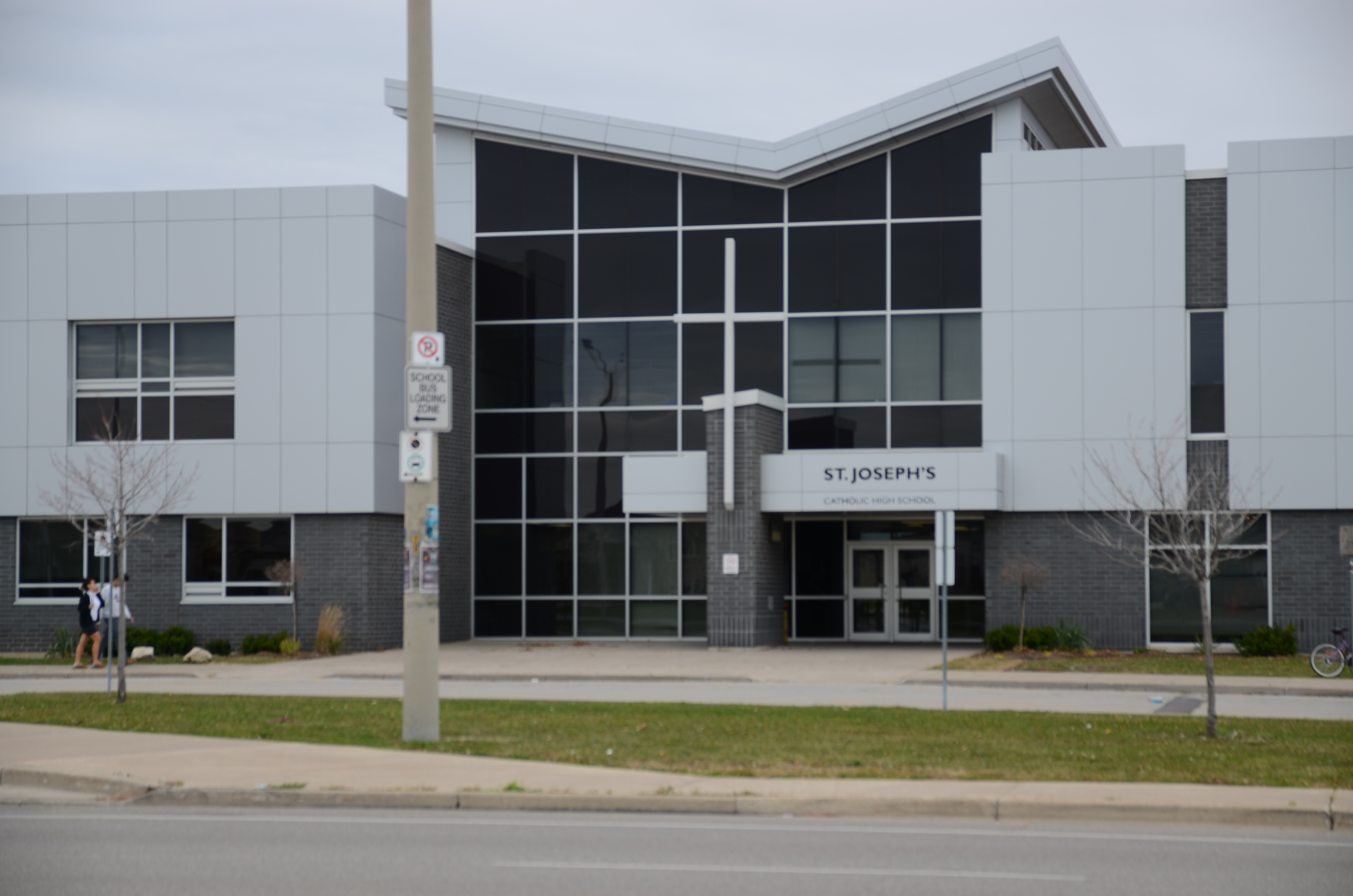

Location
- 2425 Clover Avenue; Windsor, Ontario, N8P 2A3; Canada; 42.31689°N 82.91220°W

Information
- School type: Secondary School Catholic high school
- Motto: Fortes in Christo (Strong in Christ)
- Religious affiliation: Catholic
- Patron saint: Saint Joseph
- Founded: 1989
- School board: Windsor-Essex Catholic District School Board
- Superintendent: L. Poisson
- Area trustee: K. Bouchard
- Principal: L. Beltran
- Grades: 9 to 12
- Enrollment: 1330 (2023) (2014)
- Language: English/French Immersion
- Schedule: 8:44 - 2:44
- Area: East Riverside
- Colours: Blue and Yellow
- Slogan: Respect, Responsibility, Relationships
- Team name: Lasers
- Feeder schools: H.J. Lassaline, L.A. Desmaris, St. John Vianney, St. Anne French Immersion
- Website: www.wecdsb.on.ca/schools/stjosephhs

St. Joseph's Catholic High School is a Catholic high school in Windsor, Ontario operated by the Windsor-Essex Catholic District School Board. L. Beltran is the current principal. A new school 160,000 square feet (15,000 m^{2}) in size with space for more than 1,200 students has been built at the corner of McHugh and Clover Avenue, just north of Tecumseh Road East in Windsor. It opened in September 2006. This newer school has replaced the former one at 5420 Empress Street in Windsor.

The new school building includes a physical education workout facility, cafetorium, football field & track, atrium, and the St. Joseph's Chapel.

In May 2024, it was announced that a 3.7 million dollar expansion to the school was planned to add 8 more classrooms which would provide room for 184 more students. St. Joseph's has had continual growth in its student body population since the new facility opened in 2006. As of 2024, the current enrolment is close to 1400 pupils.

St. Joseph's High School currently offers Specialist High Skills Major programs in six areas of study: Health and Wellness, Visual Arts & Media, Construction Technology, Business, French Non-Profit, and Environmental. St. Joseph's is also the home of the Construction Academy for Carpentry and Plumbing.

Its family of elementary schools includes:

1. St. Anne French Imm. CES
2. L.A. Desmarais CES
3. H.J. Lassaline CES

== Athletics ==
Sports programs including football, soccer, swimming, baseball, volleyball, basketball, badminton, wrestling and golf.

== See also ==
- Education in Ontario
- List of secondary schools in Ontario
