= Mike Brkovich =

Canadian basketball player and businessman

Personal information
- Born: April 6, 1958 (age 67) Windsor, Ontario, Canada

Career information
- High school: W. D. Lowe (Windsor, Ontario)
- College: Michigan State (1977–1981)
- NBA draft: 1981: 8th round, 181st overall pick
- Drafted by: Milwaukee Bucks

Career highlights
- NCAA champion (1979)
- Stats at Basketball Reference

Mike Brkovich (/ˈbɜːrkəvɪtʃ/ BURR-kə-vitch; born April 6, 1958) is a Canadian former basketball player from Windsor, Ontario. He is currently a Windsor-based automotive exporter and real estate developer.

== Basketball career ==
Of Serbian background (Serbian: Брковић, Brković), Brkovich played high school basketball at W. D. Lowe in Windsor. The team won the Ontario Provincial Championship in 1976 and 1977.

Brkovich played as a shooting guard on the Michigan State Spartans team that won the 1979 NCAA tournament, defeating Larry Bird's Indiana State Sycamores in the final game. Brkovich opened an earlier tournament game against Notre Dame game with a slam dunk, from which the Fighting Irish never recovered. The following year, Brkovich was the team's co-captain.

Brkovich was drafted 181st overall (8th round) by the Milwaukee Bucks in 1981, but never played in the NBA.

He was a member of the Canadian national basketball team which finished fourth in the 1979 Pan American Games. He and the rest of the team were unable to play in the 1980 Summer Olympics, due to the boycott that year.

Brkovich was inducted into the Windsor/Essex County Sports Hall of Fame in 1999.

== Business career ==
Brkovich founded a successful auto export dealership in Windsor, and later expanded into real estate ownership and development. He has advocated for the preservation and restoration of historically significant buildings in Windsor.
