= Western Secondary School =

Location
- 5791 North Townline Road; Amherstburg, Ontario, N9V 2Y9; Canada; 42.18354°N 83.01889°W

Information
- School type: Secondary School
- School board: GECDSB
- Principal: Angela Safranyos
- Grades: 9 through 12
- Enrollment: 262 (2019)
- Language: English
- Area: Essex County
- Colours: Purple and Grey
- Team name: Warriors
- Website: www.publicboard.ca/school/western/Pages/default.aspx#/=

Western Secondary School was a secondary school (grades 9 through 12) located in Amherstburg, Ontario that was managed by the Greater Essex County District School Board.

== History ==
Built in 1975 with additions in 1994 and 2000, Western Secondary School was primarily a technological school that was equipped with many shops including a machine shop, wood shop, paint shop, culinary kitchen and greenhouse.

== Future ==
In October 2016 the Ministry of Education awarded a $24.3 million grant for the construction of a new Amherstburg High School, which consolidated the [General Amherst High School] and Western SS communities. The site of the new school is located at the south end of Centennial Park off Simcoe Street between Fryer Street and Victoria Street South which was sold to the school board from the Town of Amherstburg in January 2018. Construction began in October 2020 and was completed in September 2022. The name of the new school is North Star High School. However, they have been at a different location. Their old location, listed on this article, is to be taken over by [Windsor Islamic association ] in the 2025 semester.

== See also ==
- List of high schools in Ontario
