= F. J. Brennan Catholic High School =

Coordinates: 42.325°N 82.976°W

Location
- 910 Raymo Road; Windsor, Ontario, N8Y 4A6; Canada

Information
- Motto: Caritas (Care)
- Founded: December 8, 1953
- School board: Windsor Essex Catholic District School Board
- Superintendent: Kelly-Ann Bull
- Principal: Brianne Trudell
- Grades: 9 to 12
- Enrollment: 750
- Area: East Windsor
- Mascot: Cardinal
- Feeder schools: Corpus Christi Catholic Middle School; St. John Vianney Catholic Elementary School; St. Rose Catholic Elementary School; St. Teresa of Calcutta Catholic Elementary School; W J Langlois Catholic Elementary School
- Website: www.wecdsb.on.ca/schools/fjbhs
- Last updated: November 1, 2025

F.J. Brennan Catholic High School is a Catholic secondary school located in Windsor, Ontario, Canada. It is operated by the Windsor-Essex Catholic District School Board. It serves students from grades 9 to 12. F.J Brennan has an enrollment of 750 students, as of September 2020.

== History ==
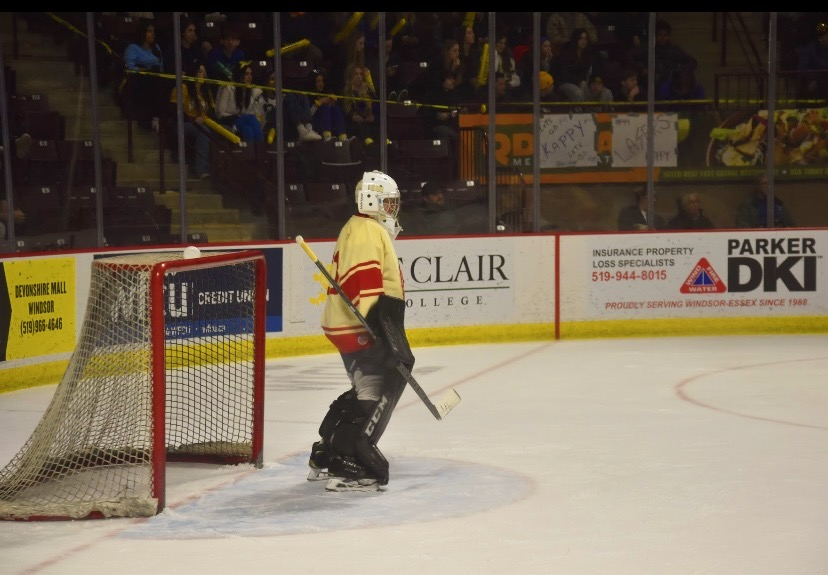
Cardinals goalie in 2023.

F.J. Brennan Catholic High School was originally named Corpus Christi High School, (meaning "the Body of Christ") and was founded in 1953. It was the first Catholic co-educational secondary school in Windsor. In 1965, Corpus Christi High School was expanded and renamed F.J. Brennan Catholic High School in honour of Monsignor Francis J. Brennan, a Windsor priest prominent in the Catholic educational system in Ontario.

Starting in the Winter 2002 semester, and ending in the Fall 2003 semester, a major renovation was completed on the school, displacing students between three separate campuses. Two were former elementary schools while the third campus was the remaining accessible part of the school. The expansion included a glass walled weight room, a new chapel, new flooring, offices, halls, lockers, and a new cafeteria. In Fall 2003, a 50th anniversary celebration/reunion was held in the newly renovated school where past decades of students attended. Certain hallways carried a theme to honor a decade (1950's, 1960's, 1970's, 1980's. 1990's and 2000's) where memorabilia was displayed.

Each year, F.J. Brennan Catholic High School and St. Joseph's Catholic High School take part in the annual Father Zakoor Cup hockey game, where this past year 2019, the F.J. Brennan Cardinals beat the St. Joseph Lasers. The current record of the Zakoor Cup series is 15-5-3 in favour of Brennan.

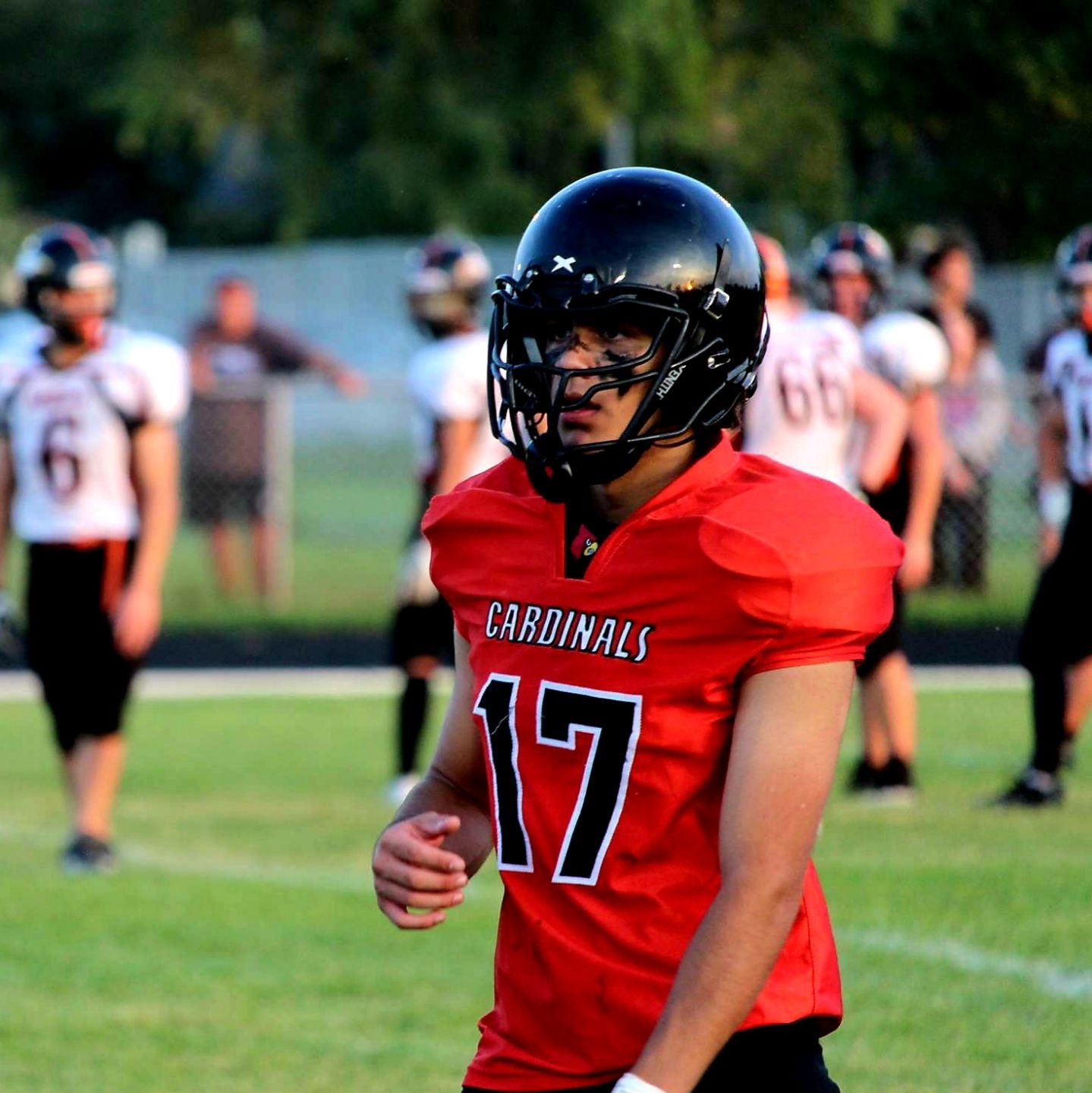
Cardinals player in 2023.

Due to the lack of students at F.J Brennan, the school was on the verge of closure. In response, the WECDSB created the Corpus Christi Middle School at the site of Brennan. The new school accepts Grades 7 through 8. Students then continue on to F.J Brennan. The school is also known for the popular YouTube video "Operation Band Prank (The Final Countdown)." In the video students in the marching band march through the halls of FJ Brennan playing The Final Countdown by Europe.

The school's strengths are in academics, sports (particularly football, volleyball and hockey), and the arts (it has excellent, award-winning music and drama programs).

== Notable alumni ==
- Joe Comartin, former MP for the riding of Windsor—Tecumseh.
- Rick Limoges, former Windsor City Councillor and MP for the riding of Windsor—St. Clair.
- Joel Quenneville, NHL coach 3 time Stanley Cup Championship and former player.

== See also ==
- Education in Ontario
- List of secondary schools in Ontario
