= Defunct =

Defunct may refer to:

- Defunct (video game), 2014
- Zombie process or defunct process, in Unix-like operating systems

== See also ==
- Category:Former entities
- End-of-life product
- Obsolescence
