= Westview Freedom Academy =

Location
- 1375 California Avenue; Windsor, Ontario, N9B 2Z8; Canada; 42.2928°N 83.0563°W

Information
- School type: Secondary School
- Motto: Skills for Life
- Founded: 1964
- School board: GECDSB
- Grades: 9 through 12
- Enrollment: 550 (2008)
- Language: English
- Team name: Falcons
- Website: www.publicboard.ca/school/westviewfreedom/Pages/default.aspx

Westview Freedom Academy is a secondary school (grades 9 through 12) in Windsor, Ontario, managed by the Greater Essex County District School Board.

Westview Freedom Academy was established by the Greater Essex County District School Board in 2014. The school services Windsor's West end population by offering programs for all levels of learners. The school offers Academic Classes, Applied Classes, English Language Learner Program, Locally Developed Classes, Adapted Basic Classes, S.T.E.P.S courses, and the Stepping-In program. Some of the many programs featured at the school include OYAP, CO-OP, SHSM, SWAC, OPS, Duel Credit Program, & OLS.

== See also ==
- Education in Ontario
- List of secondary schools in Ontario
