= Cardinal Carter Catholic Secondary School =

Coordinates: 42.0420°N 82.6163°W

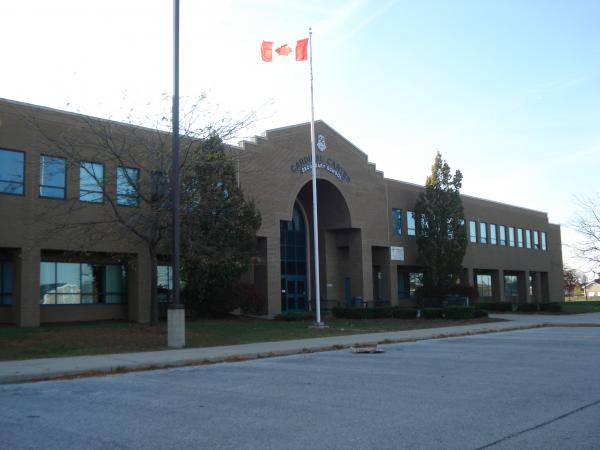

Location
- 120 Ellison Avenue; Leamington, Ontario, N8H 5C7; Canada

Information
- School type: Catholic high school
- Motto: Integrity, Loyalty, Discipline and Understanding, are values which empower us at Cardinal Carter Catholic Secondary. To spread the good news of Jesus Christ, to nurture a love for lifelong learning and to serve others.
- School board: Windsor-Essex Catholic District School Board
- Principal: Jason Georges
- Grades: 9 to 12
- Enrollment: 560
- Language: English, French
- Colours: Navy Blue, Grey, White, Some Red
- Mascot: Cougar (Cubby)
- Website: Official website

Cardinal Carter Catholic Secondary School is a high school in Leamington, Ontario under the Windsor-Essex Catholic District School Board. It was once attached to the elementary school, Queen of Peace, but moved next door in the early 1990s into a new building.

== History ==
In 1986, with the advent of full funding for Catholic Secondary education in Windsor Ontario, The Essex County Roman Catholic Separate School Board commissions Michael Haugh and Kevin Mulvey to study and implement the extension of secondary school education in Essex County. The result of their efforts saw the creation of two new Catholic Secondary schools in Essex County to take the pressure off the already overpopulated St. Anne Catholic High School in Tecumseh. Following the division of the County into three districts, two new Catholic High school sites were proposed, one for the Leamington area and one for the Lasalle area. Faith communities from Essex, Kingsville, Leamington, and Woodslee jumped on board by promoting the proposed idea of a Leamington-based Catholic Secondary School in their respective elementary feeder schools.

Soon, Grade 8 Students from Holy Name in Essex, St. John de Brebeuf in Kingsville, St. John the Evangelist in Woodslee, and St. Louis/Queen of Peace in Leamington were being made aware of the possibility of attending a new Catholic High School in their area. The beginnings of this school were to be humble. Students coming on board were made aware that the first years of their high school experience would probably take place in a portable building setting, with a permanent structure to be built in the near future.

In the fall of 1987, the decision was made by future staff and students to ask permission of Gerald Emmett Cardinal Carter, to use his name for the future Leamington area school. In the past, the Cardinal who was instrumental in the bid to bring full funding to Ontario had refused the offer to have his name used for a school. The Cardinal agreed to give his name when a letter arrived from the future students of CCCSS politely asking for the honor of using his name for their yet-to-be-constructed school. The team mascot, chosen by a vote from the Grade 8 students registered, was to be "The Cougars."

== School opened ==
On 8 September 1987, Cardinal Carter Catholic Secondary School opened its doors using the gymnasium and changing rooms of Queen of Peace School as classrooms. On October 11 blessing and official opening of school was presided over by Gerald Emmett Cardinal Carter in person. By 1989, uniforms were introduced using the official school colors of gray and blue with red as an accent. The first grade 12 Graduation Ceremony took place at St. Joseph's Church in 1991. In the fall of 1991 construction began on a permanent home for Cardinal Carter Catholic Secondary School on Ellison Street, just steps from the original port-a-pack unit of classrooms attached to Queen of Peace in which served the students from 1988 to 1992.

== Building opened ==
In the fall of 1993, Cardinal Carter opened the doors of its permanent facility and has grown to 900 students in just 18 years.

== Satellite campus ==
In February 2026, a satellite campus of the school was opened. It is located at the site of the former Queen of Peace School, which closed in 2016. The campus currently offers the Electrical Academy program, as well as a hairstyling and aesthetics program.

== See also ==
- Education in Ontario
- List of secondary schools in Ontario
