= W. D. Lowe High School =

Defunct high school in Ontario, Canada

Coordinates: 42.310434°N 83.0192°W

Information
- Other names: Lowe High School; Lowe Technical School; Lowe Vocational School
- Established: 1921
- Closed: 2000

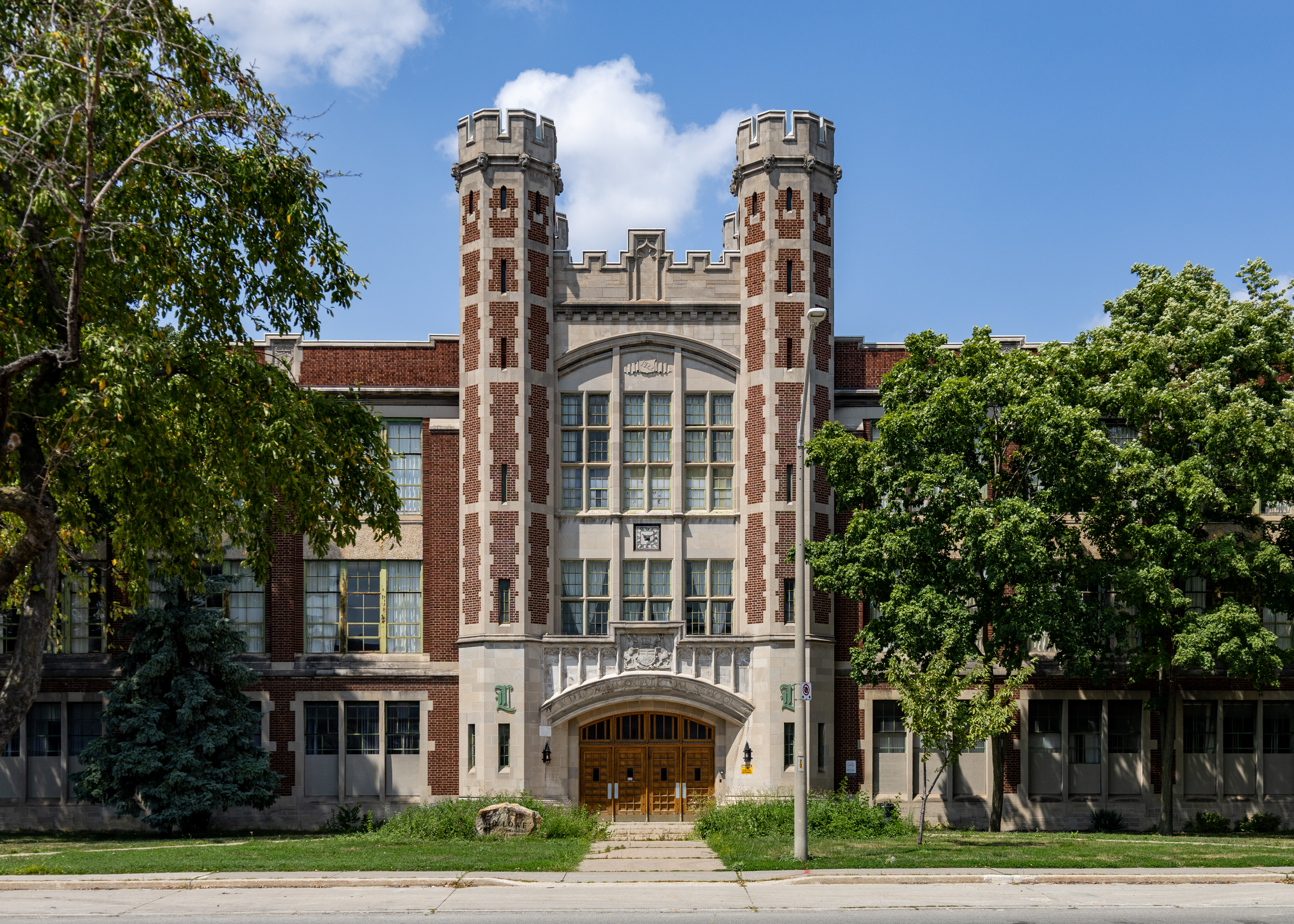
The building in 2025

W. D. Lowe High School (also known as Lowe High School, Lowe Technical School, and Lowe Vocational School) was a public secondary school in downtown Windsor, Ontario from 1921 until 2000.

== History ==
W. D. Lowe High School was located on Giles Boulevard East at Parent Ave. The school began as Walkerville Technical School and was later renamed to Windsor-Walkerville Technical School. The famous playwright, Herman Voaden, taught there during the 1920s. In the 1940s, it was renamed to W. D. Lowe after a former principal of the school, William Duff Lowe. When Lowe's first Grade 13 class wrote the Ontario Departmentals in 1966, it received the highest average of all secondary schools in Windsor.

In the 1960s, enrolment was over 1600 students, but by the end of the 1990s, it had decreased considerably. The school closed in June 2000.

== Technical education ==
The Technical School

The school had 25 shops.

From the 1970s: Electrical: Mr. Robbins, Mr. Hildebrandt. Electronics: Mr. Gilespie. Carpentry: Mr. Miloyevich. Mechanical Drafting: Mr. Savage, Mr. Deerie. Architectural Drafting: Mr. Hebert, Mr. Ouellette. Metal Casting/Foundry: Mr. Neilsen. Auto Shops: Mr. Jones, Mr. Posmatuk, Mr. Salich, Mr. O'Connor Metal Fabrication: Mr. Dupuis, Mr. Savage. Industrial Physics Lab: Mr. Chirgwin. Gas Welding: Mr. Lamb, Mr. Cowgill, Mr. McMeekin Arc Welding: Mr. Lamb, Mr. Cowgill, Mr Prosyk Machine Shop: Mr. Lamb, Mr Phillips, Pattern/Mold Making: Mr. Miloyevich, Mr. Davidson. Plumbing/Masonry: Mr. V Hewitt

== Sports ==
The school won several championships and produced many top ranking professional athletes. The sports teams were known as the "Rough Riders" until the 1970s. With the closure of Paterson Collegiate and re-organization of the school, the teams were renamed the "Trojans". John Murray coached the basketball and football teams during the 1940s and 1950s, leading the students to several championships.

Notable athletes

1920s

Coaching: Johnny Murray

Basketball: Julius "Goldie" Goldman

Hockey: Leo Lamoureux

1930s.

Boxing: Al Borchuk. Professional name Al Delaney.

Football: Mike Hedgewick.

Hockey: Harvey Teno.

1940s

Hockey: Bobby Brown, Glen Skov.

Football: Bobby Dawson.

Bowling: Kay Stanko.

Horse Jockey: Ken Church.

1950s

Marksmanship: Gerry Ouellette, Canadian Champion and 1956 Olympic Gold Medalist.

Gymnastics: Ed Gagnier.

1970s

Coaching: Gerry Brumpton.

Basketball: Mike Brkovich

Basketball: Don Brkovich

== Temporary housing for elementary students ==
The students of John Campbell Public School were relocated to the Lowe building in January 2008 while their school was being rebuilt; completion was expected in 2009. In January 2009, Princess Anne Public School students were also relocated to Lowe while the new Dr. David Suzuki Public School building was being constructed; it was due to open in 2010.

Giles Campus French Immersion Public School was created in 2011 at the former High School building to accommodate French Immersion students in the Northwest area of Windsor. This is a temporary solution due to demand for French Immersion programming in the city until a business case was approved to build a new school within the area. In January 2017 the GECDSB purchased a piece of property at 1123 Mercer Street. The former International Playing Card factory, a designated heritage building, will be preserved and included in the overall design of the new school. The new school construction should begin in December 2019 with an opening anticipated for the winter of 2020/21.
