= Greater Essex County District School Board =

School board in Ontario, Canada

Address
- 451 Park Street West Windsor, Ontario, N9A 6K1; Canada
- Coordinates: 42.3149°N 83.0432°W

District information
- Superintendents: 9
- Chair of the board: Gale Hatfield
- Director of education: Vicki Houston
- Schools: 54 elementary schools 14 secondary schools
- Budget: CA$532 million (2024-2025)

Students and staff
- Students: 35,684 (2023-2024)
- Teachers: 2,247 (2023-2024)
- Staff: 1,634 (2023-2024)

Other information
- Elected trustees: 10
- Student trustees: 2
- Website: www.publicboard.ca

The Greater Essex County District School Board (known as English-language Public District School Board No. 9 prior to 1999) was created on January 1, 1998, with the amalgamation of the Windsor Board of Education and the Essex County Board of Education. The school board serves families in both Windsor, Ontario and Essex County, Ontario in Canada.

== Schools ==
The Greater Essex County District School Board administers 14 secondary schools and 54 elementary schools.

=== Secondary ===
- Belle River District High School
- Erie Migration District School - Secondary
- Essex District High School
- Herman Academy - secondary
- Honourable W.C. Kennedy Collegiate
- Leamington District Secondary School
- North Star High School
- Riverside Secondary School
- Sandwich Secondary School
- Tecumseh Vista Academy - Secondary
- Vincent Massey Secondary School
- Walkerville Centre for the Creative Arts (located at Walkerville Collegiate Institute)
- Walkerville Collegiate Institute
- Westview Freedom Academy

=== Elementary ===
Elementary schools are grades JK-8, unless otherwise noted:

- A.V. Graham Public School
- Amherstburg Public School
- Anderdon Public School
- Beacon Heights Public School
- Belle River Public School
- Bellewood Public School
- Centennial Central Public School
- Central Public School
- Colchester North Public School
- Coronation Public School
- David Maxwell Public School
- Dr. David Suzuki Public School
- Dougall Ave. Public School
- East Mersea Public School
- Eastview Horizon Public School
- Erie Migration District School - Elementary
- Essex Public School
- F.W. Begley Public School
- Ford City Public School
- Forest Glade Public School
- General Brock Public School
- Glenwood Public School
- Gore Hill Public School
- Gosfield North Public School
- Harrow Public School
- Herman Academy - Elementary
- Hugh Beaton Public School
- James L. Dunn Public School
- John Campbell Public School
- John A. McWilliam Public School
- King Edward Public School
- Lakeshore Discovery School
- LaSalle Public School
- Legacy Oak Trail Public School
- Malden Central Public School
- Margaret D. Bennie Public School
- Marlborough Public School
- Mount Carmel-Blytheswood Public School
- MS Hetherington Public School
- Northwood Public School
- Pelee Island Public School
- Prince Edward Public School
- Princess Elizabeth Public School
- Queen Elizabeth Public School
- Queen Victoria Public School
- Roseland Public School
- Roseville Public School
- Sandwich West Public School
- Southwood Public School
- Tecumseh Vista Academy - Elementary
- Talbot Trail Public School
- West Gate Public School
- Wm. G. Davis Public School

== New construction ==
Over the last 10 years, the Greater Essex County District School Board has received a number of grants from the Ministry of Education to replace older schools with new modern buildings.

=== James L. Dunn Public School (Windsor JK-8) ===
In November 2015 the Greater Essex County District School Board received a grant from the Ministry of Education of $15.23 million to build a permanent home for the Giles Campus French Immersion Public School. Giles Campus French Immersion Public School was created in 2011 at the former W. D. Lowe High School building to accommodate French immersion students in the northwest area of Windsor. This was a temporary solution due to demand for French immersion programming in the city until a business case was approved to build a new school in the area. In January 2017 the GECDSB purchased a piece of property at 1123 Mercer Street. The former International Playing Card factory, a designated heritage building, was to be preserved and included in the overall design of the new school. The new school construction began in July 2020 and opened in September 2022.

=== Beacon Heights Public School (Tecumseh JK-8) ===
In November 2015, the Greater Essex County District School Board was awarded a grant of $15.3 million for the construction of a new dual-track French immersion / English school in the North Shore area. Beacon Heights replaced the former D.M. Eagle Public School.

=== Erie Migration District School (Kingsville JK-12) ===
In April 2016, the Ministry of Education announced funding for a $44-million JK-to-grade 12 school to be located in Kingsville. The new school consolidated students from Kingsville District High School, Harrow District High School, Kingsville Public School, and Jack Miner Public School, and may be the most expensive school the province has ever built. In 2021, the project was tendered over budget. In March 2022, the Ministry of Education announced the full $59 million to complete the project. The school opened in September 2024.

=== North Star High School (Amherstburg 9-12) ===
In October 2016, the Ministry of Education awarded a $24.3 million grant for the construction of a new Amherstburg High School, which would consolidate the General Amherst HS and Western SS communities. The site of the new school is at the south end of Centennial Park, off Simcoe Street, between Fryer Street and Victoria Street South. The site was sold to the school board from the Town of Amherstburg in January 2018. Construction began in October 2020, and the school opened in September 2022.

=== Legacy Oak Trail Public School (LaSalle JK-8) ===
In October 2016, the Ministry of Education awarded a grant of $9,180,832 to build a replacement for Prince Andrew Public School in LaSalle, Ontario. In September 2018, land was acquired by the board for the project on Leptis Magda Drive near the Vollmer Recreation Center. Construction began in June 2020 and was completed in September 2021.

=== Eastview Horizon Public School (Windsor JK-8) ===
In January 2018, the Ministry of Education awarded a grant of $13.2 million to build a new elementary school in the Forest Glade area for 501 students, with an additional four dedicated childcare classrooms. The new school would combine the existing Parkview Public School and Eastwood Public School communities into a new building on the existing Parkview School site. Construction began in May 2021, and the school opened for fall 2023.

=== Northwood Public School (Windsor JK-8) ===
In May 2022, the Ontario government announced $4.9 million to build an eight classroom addition at Northwood Public School, which would add 184 new student spaces. The addition opened for September 2025.

== See also ==
- Windsor-Essex Catholic District School Board
- List of school districts in Ontario
- List of high schools in Ontario
