= Harrow District High School =

Coordinates: 42.03222°N 82.9191°W

Location
- Box 29, 45 Wellington Street; Harrow, Ontario, N0R 1G0; Canada

Harrow District High School was located in Harrow, Ontario and was Canada's most southern high school. It had a population of about 350 students. The high school contained students from grades 7–12. The school's 100th anniversary was celebrated in 2004. The school's mascot was Harry Hawk. Their colours were blue and white. Every year they held an annual Iron Hawk to help those suffering from mental health.

The school was closed after the 2015/2016 school year and merged with Kingsville District High School.

== See also ==
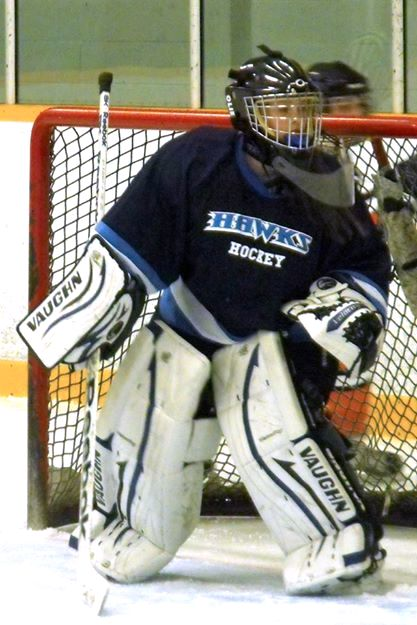
Hawks goalie in 2014.

- List of high schools in Ontario
