= Ontario Highway 39 =

Former Ontario provincial highway

Highway 39
- A map of Highway 39; Highway 39 Connecting Links; Highway 39B

Route information
- Maintained by Ministry of Transportation of Ontario
- Length: 33.8 km (21.0 mi)
- Existed: 1934–June 1, 1970 (re-numbered as Highway 2)

Major junctions
- West end: Riverside Drive, Windsor
- East end: Former Highway 2 near Belle River

Location
- Country: Canada
- Province: Ontario
- Counties: Essex County
- Major cities: Windsor
- Towns: Tecumseh, Pike Creek, Puce, Belle River

Highway system
- Ontario provincial highways; Current; Former; 400-series
← Highway 37	→ Highway 40
Former provincial highways
← Highway 38

King's Highway 39, commonly referred to as Highway 39, was a provincially maintained highway in the Canadian province of Ontario. The 33.8-kilometre (21.0 mi)-long route connected Highway 3 in downtown Windsor with Highway 2 south of Belle River, travelling along the southern shoreline of Lake St. Clair. Highway 39 was established in 1934. By 1961, the Pike Creek Bypass was opened and Highway 39 was rerouted along it, with the former route briefly becoming Highway 39B. The route was renumbered as Highway 2 in 1970, retiring the designation from the provincial highway system. Highway 2 was itself decommissioned along the former route of Highway 39 on January 1, 1998, and transferred to Essex County and the City of Windsor. It was subsequently redesignated as Essex County Road 22.

== Route description ==
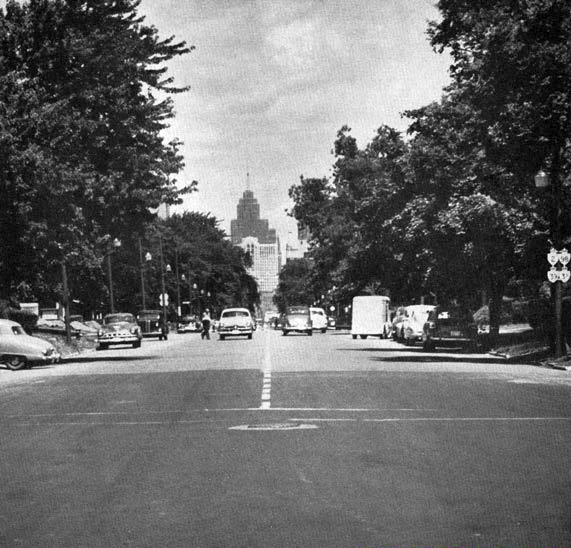
Facing west towards downtown Windsor along Ouellette Avenue in 1951. The sign assembly at right features reassurance markers for Highway 2, Highway 3B, Highway 39, and Highway 98

Highway 39 began in downtown Windsor at the intersection of Ouellette Avenue and Riverside Drive. That intersection also served as the terminus for Highway 3B and Highway 98; Highway 2 continued through the intersection to the Detroit–Windsor Tunnel. All four routes travelled concurrently southeast along Ouellette Avenue to Tecumseh Road, at which point Highway 3B branched west along that road while the others turned east. At Howard Avenue, Highway 39 continued east while Highway 2 and Highway 98 turned south.

Highway 39 jogged south from Tecumseh Road to the Pike Creek Bypass at Banwell Road, gradually curving east onto it along what is now Mulberry Drive; the Pike Creek Bypass was connected to the E. C. Row Expressway when it was extended east to Shawnee Road in May 1981. It followed the bypass south of the community of Pike Creek, crossing over the creek of the same name and passing south of the J.P. Wiser's Whisky storage facility. After paralleling along the south side of a Canadian National rail line, Highway 39 returned onto Tecumseh Road. Following the southern shoreline of Lake St. Clair, it crossed over the Puce River and through the communities of Puce and Emeryville. Becoming Notre Dame Street, the highway travelled through the town of Belle River and crossed the river of the same name. Exiting the town, the route crossed Duck Creek then curved south alongside it. After passing over a Canadian Pacific rail line, it ended at an intersection with Highway 2, which continued east to Tilbury.

== History ==
=== Assumption ===
Highway 39 was one of several provincial highways intended to funnel traffic from the border crossings in Windsor through Essex County. The concept for a "Blue Water Highway" along the shores of the Detroit River, Lake St. Clair and thenceforth to Chatham alongside the Thames River was first made by the town of Belle River in 1927. Noting that the route was already paved, this premise was presented to the Department of Highways (DHO), predecessor to the modern Ministry of Transportation, multiple times over the next several years, with the province opting instead to build and improve the Provincial Road (now Essex County Road 46), and later the Base Line Road (now Essex County Road 42). Despite this, the highway along Tecumseh Road and the lakefront continued to be lobbied for by local merchants and governments into the 1930s.

The DHO finally agreed to take over the route, assuming control over 22.9 kilometres (14.2 mi) of roads through Maidstone, Rochester and Sandwich East townships on July 11, 1934. The new highway began at the Windsor–Ford City boundary at Drouillard Road, and proceeded east along Tecumseh Road; the sections through the towns of Tecumseh and Belle River were designated as Connecting Links. Within Windsor, the highway was signed along local roads (Tecumseh Road and Ouellette Avenue) to the Detroit–Windsor tunnel.

In 1939, several renumberings took place in Essex County. Following pressure by the Essex County Automobile Club to number all three highways between Windsor and Tilbury with the number 2, Highway 39 was redesignated as Highway 2B in January. Two months later, the province instituted a change to its "numbering" policy in which lettered suffixes would only be used for short feeder routes and not for long distance routes. Consequently, Highway 2B became Highway 39 again, effective March 18.

=== Tecumseh Bypass ===
Traffic levels increased over the following decades, with two at-grade crossings of the Michigan Central Railroad becoming the site of frequent deadly accidents. In August 1951, the towns of Tecumseh and Belle River petitioned the DHO to construct a bypass along the south side of the tracks, avoiding both crossings. The DHO opted to install automated signals and gates instead. The towns made a second request in March 1955, to which the DHO agreed to conduct a survey into the need for a bypass that summer. Plans were developed for the highway over the following years, including a proposal to connect the bypass with the proposed E. C. Row Avenue extension in 1957.

The western end of Highway 39 was expanded from two to four lanes from Jefferson Avenue to Tecumseh in 1957 and 1958. In April 1958, the DHO announced that it would proceed with constructing the bypass, as it was not possible to widen the existing highway through Tecumseh. Concurrent with construction of the new bypass, which began in the fall of 1959, the highway was widened through Belle River. The existing route through Tecumseh and Pike Creek was rehabilitated as part of the work. The Highway 39 Bypass was opened the week of November 20, 1961. The provincial portion of the former route through Tecumseh, east of Manning Road, became Highway 39B briefly before being decommissioned on August 10, 1962.

As part of a larger reorganisation of highways in Essex County following the completion of Highway 401, Highway 2 west of the Highway 39 intersections near Belle River was transferred to Essex County on June 1, 1970. Consequently, Highway 39 was renumbered as a continuation of Highway 2 into Windsor.

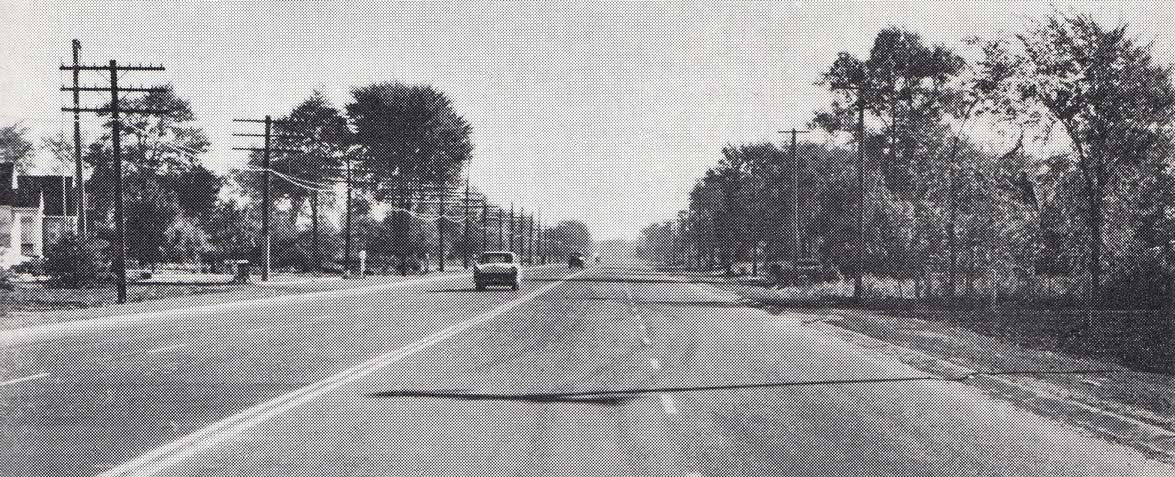
Westward view of the recently widened Highway 39 at Riverside in 1958

== Major intersections ==
The following table lists the major junctions along Highway 39, as noted by the Ministry of Transportation of Ontario. The entire route was located in Essex County.

Location	km	mi	Destinations	Notes
Windsor	0.0	0.0	Highway 2 west / Highway 18 (Riverside Drive)	Beginning of concurrency with Highway 2, Highway 3B and Highway 98
Windsor	2.9	1.8	Highway 3B west (Tecumseh Boulevard)	End of Highway 3B concurrency; Highway 2, Highway 39 and Highway 98 turned east onto Tecumseh Boulevard
Windsor	3.6	2.2	Highway 2 south / Highway 98 (Howard Avenue)	End of Highway 2 and Highway 98 concurrency
Windsor	5.5	3.4	Walker Road	
Windsor	10.3	6.4	Lauzon Parkway	
Windsor	13.4	8.3	Banwell Road	Highway 39 turned south
Windsor	14.3	8.9	Pike Creek Bypass	In 1970, a gentle curve connected Banwell Road and the Pike Creek Bypass
Windsor–Sandwich boundary	16.3	10.1	County Road 19 (Manning Road)	
Puce	23.5	14.6	County Road 2 west (Old Tecumseh Road)	Route of Highway 39 before 1961
Puce	23.8	14.8	County Road 25 south (East Puce Road)	
Belle River	29.4	18.3	County Road 27 (South Street)	
	33.8	21.0	Highway 2 east – London	Now Essex County Road 42
1.000 mi = 1.609 km; 1.000 km = 0.621 mi

== See also ==
- List of numbered roads in Essex County
