= Ontario Highway 98 =

Former Ontario provincial highway

King's Highway 98
- Provincial Road, Middle Road, Essex County Road 46, Chatham-Kent Municipal Road 8
- Highway 98 highlighted in red, pre-1966 routing into Windsor in blue

Route information
- Maintained by Ministry of Transportation of Ontario
- Length: 96.3 km (59.8 mi)
- Existed: March 18, 1939–April 1, 1971.

Major junctions
- West end: Highway 2 in Windsor
- East end: Highway 3 in Blenheim

Location
- Country: Canada
- Province: Ontario
- Counties: Essex, Chatham-Kent
- Major cities: Windsor, Maidstone, Woodslee, Comber, Tilbury, Merlin, Blenheim

Highway system
- Ontario provincial highways; Current; Former; 400-series
| ← Highway 94 | → Highway 101 |
Former provincial highways
| ← Highway 97 | Highway 99 → |

King's Highway 98, commonly referred to as Highway 98, was a provincially maintained highway in the Canadian province of Ontario, designated as part of the provincial highway system between 1939 and 1971. The route travelled through the northern part of Essex County and through south-central Chatham-Kent, extending 96.3 kilometres (59.8 mi) from Windsor to Blenheim. Since 1998, it has been known as Essex County Road 46 between Windsor and Tilbury, and Chatham-Kent Road 8 between Tilbury and Blenheim.

Between Windsor and Tilbury, Highway 98 followed what was the original route of Highway 2, and later Highway 2A. After being assigned a unique route number in 1939, it was extended east to Blenheim in 1941. The purpose of Highway 98 within the provincial highway network was superseded by Highway 401, which was opened in sections between Windsor and London from 1957 to 1964. Consequently, it was transferred to Essex and Kent counties in 1970 and 1971.

== Route description ==
Highway 98 travelled from Windsor to Blenheim via Maidstone, Tilbury, Merlin and Charing Cross. The former route of Highway 98 is entirely urbanised to approximately 2 km (1.2 mi) east of the Highway 401 interchange. East of that point, the highway is almost exclusively surrounded by flat farmland outside of the communities that dot its length. Two conservation areas are located along the highway, both of which are maintained by the Essex Region Conservation Authority: Maidstone Conservation Area and Big O Conservation Area. It is known by various names, including Howard Avenue, Provincial Road, Middle Road and Middle Line; as well as by various designations: Essex County Road 46 and Chatham-Kent Road 8.

Prior to 1966, the route began in downtown Windsor at the intersection of Ouellette Avenue and Riverside Drive. That intersection also served as the terminus for Highway 3B, Highway 18, and Highway 39; Highway 2 continued through the intersection to meet Highway 3 at the Detroit–Windsor Tunnel. Highway 2, Highway 3B, Highway 39 and Highway 98 travelled southeast concurrently along Ouellette Avenue to Tecumseh Road, at which point Highway 3B branched west along that road while the others turned east. At Howard Avenue, Highway 39 continued east while Highway 2 and Highway 98 turned south. They then travelled concurrently to Cabana Road / Division Road, where Highway 2 split onto Division Road and Highway 98 onto Provincial Road.

Highway 98 left Windsor as it encountered an interchange with Highway 401 (Exit 14). It travelled southeast, parallel to and north of Highway 3, to Maidstone. There, the highway curved and became Middle Road. It followed this road east, travelling through the communities of Pleasant Park, North Woodslee and Ruscom Station before curving northeast and through Comber. It curved east briefly before turning back northeast and skirting the southern edge of Tilbury. At the intersection of Queen Street South and Wheatley Road it left Essex County and entered what is now the municipality of Chatham-Kent. Continuing east, now as Middle Line, the route encountered the communities of Valetta, Stewart and Merlin before curving northeast. It bisected South Buxton before encountering Charing Cross and turning east. It continued for a short distance into Blenheim, where it ended at Highway 3 (Talbot Street).

== History ==
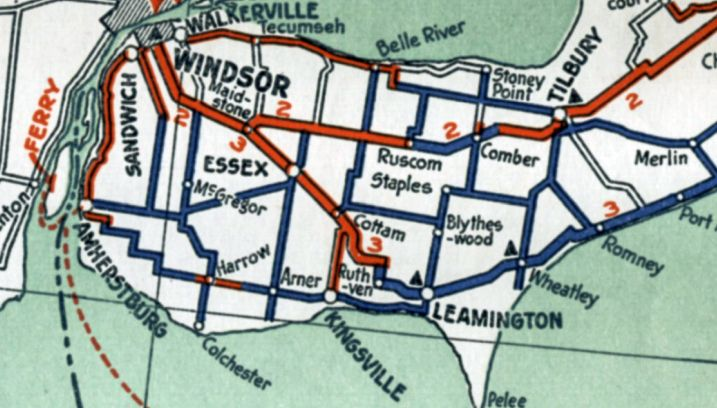
1926 highway map of Essex County, before the opening of the Ambassador Bridge

=== Predecessor ===
Highway 98 was first assigned in 1939 out of a route renumbering scheme. However, the route it would follow was already maintained by the Department of Public Highway (DPHO), predecessor to the modern Ministry of Transportation of Ontario, as early as 1920. Although the rest of the route which later became Highway 2, from London to the Quebec boundary, was easily decided upon, the section west of London became a contentious local issue. Cities including Sarnia, St. Thomas, Leamington, Chatham, Tilbury, Windsor, and even London itself, as well as numerous road and business associations, lobbied the provincial government to take over certain roads that provided the greatest benefit to them. London and St. Thomas in particular insisted that "the Provincial Highway" follow the Longwood Road or the Talbot Road, respectively. In the end, the province chose to utilise both the Longwood and Talbot roads, creating an entire network of highways in the process. In April 1920, the DPHO assumed control of several roads connecting Windsor with London via Maidstone, Tilbury and Chatham as part of "the Provincial Highway".

The Provincial Highway was assigned a number — Highway 2 — during the summer of 1925. It travelled concurrently with the International Highway — Highway 3 — from the former ferry docks at Riverside Drive and Ouellette Avenue. It then followed Ouellette Avenue south to Tecumseh Road, where it jogged west and turned south onto Dougall Avenue, then onto Howard Avenue, and east along Talbot Road. At Maidstone, the concurrency ended, with Highway 2 branching northeast along Malden Road and east on Middle Road. This arrangement remained in place until the opening of the Ambassador Bridge on November 15, 1929, which resulted in several modifications to the highway network within Essex County.

=== Renumberings ===
In anticipation of the opening of the Ambassador Bridge, as well as the nearby Detroit–Windsor tunnel, Windsor and the surrounding townships sought road improvements between Windsor and Maidstone to alleviate traffic along Talbot Road and bypass or separate several level crossings of the Michigan Central Railway (MCR) beginning in early 1929. The province chose to designate a new right-of-way adjacent to and north of the MCR in July of that year, and spent the next several months constructing the cut-off (now known as Provincial Road) from Howard Avenue to north of Maidstone. By 1930, Highway 2 had been rerouted to begin at the ferry docks, following Ouellette Avenue to Tecumseh Road, then east to and south along Howard Avenue; the short segment near Maidstone became Highway 2A.

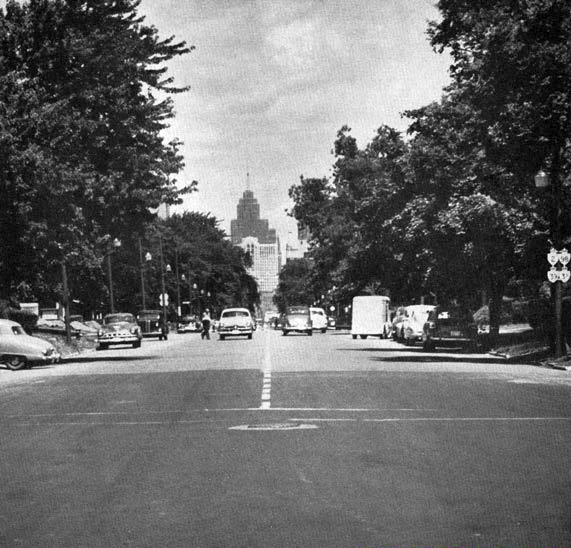
Facing west towards downtown Windsor along Ouellette Avenue in 1951. The sign assembly at right features reassurance markers for Highway 2, Highway 3B, Highway 39, and Highway 98.

Meanwhile, the province set out to build a third highway into Windsor. Essex County had designated County Road 19 along Cabana Road (now Division Road) and Baseline Road to Tilbury on April 19, 1928, and soon thereafter the DPHO promised to take over the route as a new provincial highway. Highway 18 was officially designated on June 11, 1930 along the route, while construction was already underway on a gentle curve between Provincial Road and the new highway, which was completed on July 14, 1931. Between then and early 1932, several more changes were made to the highway system. Since the route of Highway 18 was shorter than the route of Highway 2 between Windsor and Tilbury, the newly renamed Department of Highways (DHO) renumbered Highway 18 as Highway 2 in February 1932, while the old route of Highway 2 became Highway 2A.

In 1939, the province instituted a change to its "numbering" policy in which lettered suffixes would only be used for short feeder routes and not for long distance routes. Consequently, Highway 2A became Highway 98 effective March 18, 1939. Taking inspiration from a program first carried out in Welland County in the summer of 1931 by the Rose Highway Association, the Essex County Tourist Association and Essex County Automobile Club began providing rose bushes to property owners along the route at reduced costs, gaining Highway 98 the nickname "The Rose Trail".

=== Extension, improvements and replacement ===
Highway 98 was extended east through Kent County to Blenheim along Kent County Road 8 on April 30, 1941, increasing its length by 39.0 km (24.2 mi). The short section of Highway 98 along Queen Street through Tilbury was redesignated as Highway 98B, but was never signed as such. Initially, the new section of Highway 98 was paved through the village of Merlin as well as between Charing Cross and Blenheim, while the remainder was gravel-surfaced. Paving operations resumed following World War II, with the section between Merlin and Charing Cross being paved in 1946. The last remaining gravel section, between Tilbury and Merlin, was paved in 1950.

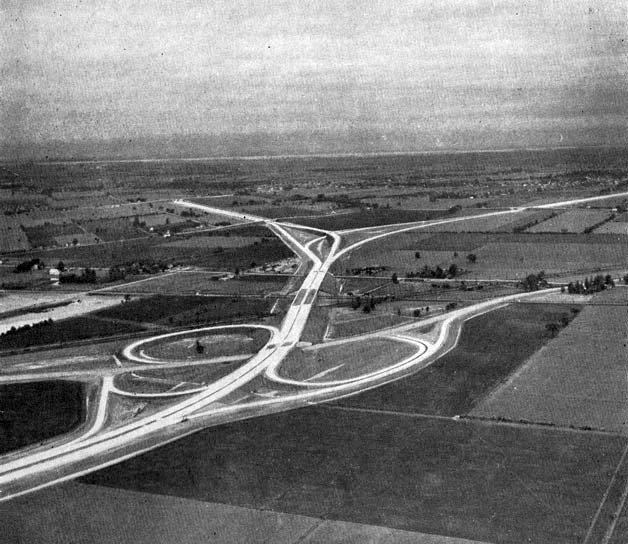
Aerial view of Highway 401 facing southwest in 1958. The interchange with Highway 98 is in the foreground, and the split at Dougall Parkway in the background.

Construction of Highway 401 in the Essex county began in the early 1950s, with the new "superhighway" opening in segments as it was completed. While the section from Highway 98 to west of Tilbury was opened on August 15, 1957, steel shortages would delay the completion of the entrances into Windsor until June 9, 1958. A bypass around Tilbury opened November 20, 1961. East of Tilbury, the highway was opened one carriageway at a time; the westbound lanes opened to Highway 21 on September 20, 1963, while the eastbound lanes opened as far east as Bloomfield Road south of Chatham on September 17, 1964, and several months later to the Kent County boundary on December 7.

Following the completion of Highway 401, the DHO commissioned the Southwestern Ontario Highway Planning Study, which was completed in July 1966. It examined traffic patterns and determined ideal travel lines and redundant routes. The new freeway had shifted the majority of long-distance traffic onto it, and severely reduced volume on parallel routes (Highways 2, 3, 39, 18, and 98). Accordingly, the DHO sought to divest itself of the costs of maintaining these roads. The portion of Highway 98 east of Tilbury was transferred to Kent County on May 21, 1970, in exchange for the DHO assuming Highway 40 between Chatham and Blenheim. The portion between Windsor and Tilbury was supposed to be transferred to Essex County on June 1, 1970, but was delayed until April 1, 1971. This removed Highway 98 from the provincial highway system entirely. The former highway has since been known as Essex County Road 46 west of Tilbury, and Kent County Road 8 or Chatham-Kent Municipal Road 8 east of Tilbury.

== Major intersections ==
The following table lists the major junctions along Highway 98, as noted by the Ministry of Transportation of Ontario. Distances in this table were calculated using Google Earth

| Division | Location | km | mi | Destinations | Notes |
|---|---|---|---|---|---|
| Essex | Windsor | 0.0 | 0.0 | Highway 2 west / Highway 18 (Riverside Drive) | Beginning of concurrency with Highway 2, Highway 3B and Highway 39 |
| Essex | Windsor | 2.9 | 1.8 | Highway 3B west (Tecumseh Road) | End of Highway 3B concurrency; Highway 2, Highway 39 and Highway 98 turned east onto Tecumseh Road |
| Essex | Windsor | 3.6 | 2.2 | Highway 2 south (Howard Avenue); Highway 39 east (Tecumseh Road) | End of Highway 39 concurrency; Highway 2 and Highway 98 turned south onto Howard Avenue |
| Essex | Windsor | 6.6 | 4.1 | Howard Avenue / Division Street split | |
| Essex | Windsor | 8.0– 8.9 | 5.0– 5.5 | Division Street / Provincial Road Split; Cabana Road | End of Highway 2 concurrency; Highway 98 followed Provincial Road |
| Essex | Windsor | 10.9 | 6.8 | Walker Road | |
| Essex | East Sandwich | 11.4 | 7.1 | Highway 401 | Exit 14 |
| Essex | East Sandwich | 14.7 | 9.1 | – | Highway 98 became North Talbot Road |
| Essex | Maidstone | 19.0 | 11.8 | County Road 19 (Manning Road) | Highway 98 became Middle Road |
| Essex | Woodslee | 32.2 | 20.0 | County Road 27 (Belle River Road) – Belle River | |
| Essex | Comber | 46.0 | 28.6 | Highway 77 – Leamington | |
| Chatham-Kent | Tilbury | 56.5 | 35.1 | Highway 98B (Queen Street South); Municipal Road 1 (Wheatley Road) | |
| Chatham-Kent | Stewart | 68.0 | 42.3 | Municipal Road 14 (Port Road) | |
| Chatham-Kent | Merlin | 73.5 | 45.7 | Municipal Road 7 (Merlin Road) | |
| Chatham-Kent | South Buxton | 79.0 | 49.1 | Municipal Road 6 (A.D. Shadd Road) | |
| Chatham-Kent | Charing Cross | 88.5 | 55.0 | Municipal Road 10 (Charing Cross Road) – Chatham | |
| Chatham-Kent | Blenheim | 96.6 | 60.0 | Highway 3 (Talbot Street West) | |
1.000 mi = 1.609 km; 1.000 km = 0.621 mi

== See also ==
- List of Essex County Roads
