= Forest Glade, Windsor =

Coordinates: 42.3092°N 82.9197°W

Forest Glade
- Neighbourhood of Windsor
- Nickname: The Glade
- Interactive map of Forest Glade
- Country: Canada
- Province: Ontario
- County: Essex
- City: Windsor

Population
  - Estimate (2016): 19,000
  - Demonym: Forest Glader
- Postal Code format: N8Rxxx
- Area code: 519/ 226

Forest Glade is an urban/suburban community located in the east end of Windsor, Ontario, Canada. Forest Glade forms a large section of the Windsor's border with Tecumseh, Ontario and is situated near the former town of Riverside, Ontario. It has an estimated population of 19,000 people. The physical borders of the community are Tecumseh Road East to the North, Banwell Road to the East, Lauzon Road to the West, and E.C. Row Expressway to the South.

Forest Glade is accessed from three directions: West (off Lauzon Parkway), north (off Tecumseh Road East), and east (off Banwell Road). Nearby to a Tecumseh Road entrance is an entrance to the Ganatchio Trail, as well as a multitude of fast food restaurants, Tecumseh Mall, and several grocery stores. It has quick access to E.C. Row Expressway and is home to the easternmost sections of Transit Windsors 1C, 4, and 10 bus routes, providing excellent access to virtually anywhere in the city.

== Community landmarks ==
Forest Glade features an Optimist Club, twin ice pads at Forest Glade Arena, along with the Forest Glade branch of the Windsor Public Library. Also notable are a public skate park, baseball diamonds, and tennis courts. These facilities collectively are referred to as the Forest Glade Community Centre.

There are three public elementary schools in the area: Forest Glade Public School, Eastview Horizon Public School. In addition to these, there are two Catholic school board schools: L.A. Desmarais and H.J. Lassaline.

Housing in Forest Glade generally consists of freestanding single family homes, owned as opposed to rented. There are a number of apartment buildings, but the majority of the population of the area live in houses. Numerous churches and religious places are present in the community. A shopping plaza, or small strip mall, is located near the Community Centre.

== Character ==
Although Forest Glade, or simply "The Glade" is an official part of the City of Windsor, many residents show a sense of patriotism that would suggest it were an independent town.

Forest Glade is well known amongst Windsorites for having an abundance of winding and confusing roads. Getting lost in the community is easy as there are many crescents and some of the streets even intersect themselves. Numerous crescent-type streets are renamed midway through, making navigation for those unfamiliar with the area difficult.

The community is an example of a planned community, as until the late 1960s, the area was mainly farmland, with fewer than a dozen houses in the area. The community was built in stages throughout the 1960s, 1970s, and 1980s, with most of the available land between the road boundaries being used. The most recent expansion is in the northeast corner, constructing new houses near Banwell Road.

== See also ==
- Neighbourhoods of Windsor, Ontario
- planned community
