= Ontario Highway 3A =

Ontario Highway 3A may refer to:

- the former section of Ontario Highway 3 between Chambers Corners and Niagara Falls
- the former designation of Ontario Highway 3B in Windsor
