= E. C. Row Expressway =

Freeway in Windsor, Ontario

- E. C. Row; Highway 7087 (Unsigned)
- E. C. Row Expressway highlighted in red

Route information
- Length: 15.4 km (9.6 mi)
- History: Planned 1969; Constructed 1971–June 9, 1983

Major junctions
- West end: Ojibway Parkway intersection in West Windsor
- Highway 401 in West Windsor
- East end: Banwell Road on border of City of Windsor/Town of Tecumseh

Location
- Country: Canada
- Province: Ontario
- Major cities: Windsor

Highway system
- Ontario municipal expressways
(in alphabetical order)
← Dougall Parkway	E. C. Row Expressway	Gardiner Expressway →

The E. C. Row Expressway is a municipal expressway in the city of Windsor, Ontario, Canada. It divides the city in half as it crosses it between the Ojibway Parkway in the west and Banwell Road in the east, a distance of 15.4 kilometres (9.6 mi). It was built between 1971 and 1983, reaching completion across the city on June 9, 1983. It was part of Highway 2 and Highway 18 until the province transferred ownership and responsibility for the route to the City of Windsor on April 1, 1997. In 2015, the westernmost 3 kilometres (1.9 mi) was significantly upgraded as part of the Highway 401 extension (Herb Gray Parkway) project. The freeway is named after Edgar Charles Row, the president of Chrysler Canada between 1951 and 1956.

While allowing for easy travel across the city, the E. C. Row Expressway was isolated for much of its existence as it did not connect directly to the United States nor Highway 401; drivers had to access the Ambassador Bridge via Huron Church Road, or the Detroit–Windsor Tunnel via Dougall Parkway, both surface streets were also needed to reach Highway 401. This situation was rectified in 2015 with the opening of the Rt. Hon. Herb Gray Parkway extension of Highway 401, as well as the opening of the Gordie Howe International Bridge in 2026.

== Route description ==
The E. C. Row Expressway is a 15.4-kilometre-long (9.6 mi) route with a speed limit of 100 kilometres per hour (62 mph). It begins at a signalized intersection with the Ojibway Parkway, curving gently from northeastward to eastward. It travels east-northeast as a four lane fully controlled-access freeway with a grass median and grade-separated interchanges.

E. C. Row facing west at Huron Church Road prior to construction of the Herb Gray Parkway

After crossing Matchette Road, where ramps provide access to and from the eastbound and westbound lanes of the expressway, respectively, the opposing lanes of the expressway split to the south of Malden Park. The eastbound lanes diverge south and cross the Herb Gray Parkway, sandwiching it between the E. C Row Expressway. Slip ramps provide access between the two parallel freeways before the parkway diverges and travels under the eastbound carriageway of the E. C. Row to the west of Huron Church Road. The expressway curves east-northeast and crosses Huron Church and becomes sandwiched between residential subdivisions. After interchanges with Dominion Boulevard and Dougall Avenue, the route crosses the Canadian National (CN) Caso subdivision railway lines and briefly passes through an industrial area.

The highway quickly meets another interchange at Howard Avenue, where it also crosses Turkey Creek and the former alignment of Grand Marais Road. Southeast of this interchange is Devonshire Mall while to the north are low-density commercial units. East of the interchange, the E. C. Row once again travels between residential subdivisions. To the north lies Remington Park while to the south is Devonshire Heights. Crossing into Walkerville at a diamond interchange with Walker Road, the highway becomes surrounded by a business park; the Walker Road interchange also connects with the Central Avenue interchange. This also marks the end of the illuminated section of the expressway.

Now north of Windsor Airport, the route crosses over the Canadian Pacific Windsor Subdivision just west of a partial interchange with Jefferson Boulevard, which provides westbound access to and eastbound access from the expressway. The route passes south of the Ford Essex Engine Plant before meeting the Lauzon Parkway at an interchange. It crosses Little River before entering an area with a subdivision to the north and a commercial park to the south. The commercial zoning eventually transitions to agricultural fields, and the E. C. Row Expressway curves northeast and intersects Banwell Road at-grade. With the opening of the NextStar battery manufacturing plant, construction to replace the at-grade intersection with a limited-access interchange is underway. East of Banwell Road, the road continues as the Pike Creek Bypass, former Highway 2.

== History ==
The history of the E. C. Row Expressway dates back to January 1963, when the City of Windsor and the Department of Highways released a report called The Windsor Area Transportation Study (WATS). One of the primary issues identified by the study was "a limited and inadequate street network in the east-west direction generally resulting from several railway barriers". Properties were purchased along E. C. Row Avenue (named in 1956 after the retiring president of Chrysler Canada (1951-1956), Ohio-born E. C. Row) and the Third Concession within Sandwich Township beginning in 1958 for what was then intended as a two-lane road linking Highway 18 with Highway 39 (which became Highway 2 in 1970). However, with the release of WATS and the subsequent amalgamation in 1966 in which Windsor annexed portions of the surrounding townships, plans for an expressway along the corridor were first conceived. The original plans for the expressway dating back to 1969 were for it to travel from current County Road 22, heading west along the southern edge of Belle River and Tecumseh, meeting up with the current two-lane freeway alignment (Pike Creek Bypass) just east of Puce, as well as having the west end continue south through Lasalle to north of Amherstburg.

The first stage of construction began in 1970 to bridge the two sections of E. C. Row Avenue over the CN railway line between Dougall Avenue (then Highway 3B) and Howard Avenue (a former alignment of Highway 2); this work was completed in 1973. In 1976, contracts were awarded to extend the new divided expressway east to Walker Avenue. At the request of Ford Motor Company of Canada, construction on the expressway was soon accelerated. By early 1980, the existing construction contracts were completed, and work began to connect the expressway between Huron Church Road and Dougall Avenue. Construction of a two-laned extension west to connect with the Ojibway Parkway (Highway 18) began by the end of that year. The expressway was opened between Central Avenue and Lauzon Parkway on December 19, 1980. The final section, connecting with Highway 2 as a two lane expressway at Banwell Road, opened the week of May 4, 1981. The unsignalised intersection with Shawnee Road was quickly recognised as a hazard. As a result, Westlake Drive was built and Shawnee closed at the expressway in late 1983. By April 1982, the four-laned expressway was complete between Huron Church Road and east of Lauzon Parkway, and with Ojibway Parkway via a two-lane expressway west of Huron Church Road. Following this, Highway 2 was rerouted west of Banwell Road off Tecumseth Road to instead travel along the expressway, while Highway 18 was rerouted off Sandwich Street to followed the expressway; both then followed Highway 3 along Huron Church Road to the Ambassador Bridge.

Construction stalled for several years as funding was diverted from the project during a recession in the early 1980s. It would take until 1987 for work to resume to replace the at-grade intersections at Matchette Road, Malden Road, Huron Church Road and Dominion Boulevard. The City of Windsor nevertheless earmarked funding from their budget to build the last two of those interchanges in late 1986. The province later stepped in to provide a share of the funding in March 1987, and work began with contracts being awarded for construction on August 26 and September 16 of that year for interchanges at Dominion Boulevard and Huron Church Road, respectively. The City of Windsor also negotiated with the province for funding of an interchange at Matchette Road in late April of that year, which was approved by September 1. On September 29, 1988, the Huron Church Road and Dominion Boulevard interchanges were opened to traffic.

Work began in October 1989 to twin the existing two-laned route between the Ojibway Parkway and Huron Church Road by building a second parallel roadway to serve as the eastbound lanes. Construction of a partial interchange at Matchette Road as well as an overpass of Malden Road was included in this project, which was completed in September 1990. The project to complete the expressway in the east — by twinning the route between Lauzon Parkway and the Windsor boundary east of Banwell Road — began immediately after; it was completed in late 1991. The overall cost of the expressway between Ojibway Parkway and Banwell Road, originally estimated (in 1967) at $55 million, was $115 million, out of which the province contributed $94 million.

Planning subsequently began to extend the expressway east to Manning Road along the existing two-lane Pike Creek Bypass. However, budget constraints brought on by a recession in the early 1990s resulted in the Mike Harris provincial government forming the Who Does What? committee to determine cost-cutting measures in order to balance the budget after a deficit incurred under premier Bob Rae. It was determined that many Ontario highways no longer served long-distance traffic movement and should, therefore, be maintained by local or regional levels of government. The MTO consequently transferred many highways to lower levels of government in 1997 and 1998, removing a significant percentage of the provincial highway network. As the E. C. Row Expressway was designed to serve commuter traffic in Windsor, and not province-wide movement, the route was transferred to the City of Windsor on April 1, 1997. No work has progressed on the extension since.

Beginning in 2011, the E. C. Row Expressway west of Huron Church Road underwent a complete reconstruction as part of the $1.4 billion Herb Gray Parkway project which included a major realignment of 1.7 kilometres (1.1 miles) of the eastbound carriageway between Matchette Road and Huron Church Road to allow for an extension of Highway 401 to travel within their median, while the westbound lanes of the E. C. Row remained largely unchanged except for the addition of streetlights. The project was completed on November 21, 2015 and allows E. C. Row traffic to connect with the bridge-bound portion of Highway 401 via slip ramps located east of Machete Road. The E. C. Row still lacks direct access to the London-bound portion of Highway 401, however, the completion of phase one of the Highway 401 extension (Herb Gray Parkway) means that the indirect connection using Huron Church Road has been reduced to a short distance (with one traffic light) between the Parclo A4 interchange with the E. C. Row and the slip ramps with Highway 401.

In 2015, construction began on the widening and expansion of E. C. Row's eastern extension, County Road 22. The highway was widened to four lanes from Banwell Road to E Puce Road (County Road 25) in Puce. As of 2018, this project has been completed and includes a roundabout at the intersection of County Road 22 and Old Tecumseh Road.

In September 2025, work began on replacing the at-grade intersection with Banwell Road. In anticipation of increased traffic demands from the newly built NextStar Energy battery plant, the intersection will be replaced with a Parclo A4 interchange. Additionally, the stretch of Banwell Road from Wildwood Drive to the CPKC mainline will have capacity increased from 2 to 4 lanes to compliment previous upgrades to the corridor. Construction is estimated to be completed in 2027-2028.

== Exit list ==
The following table lists the major junctions along E. C. Row Expressway, as noted by the Ministry of Transportation of Ontario. The entire route is located in Windsor. All exits are unnumbered.

km	mi	Destinations	Notes
0.0	0.0	Ojibway Parkway Highway 401 east (Herb Gray Parkway) – London	At-grade intersection; formerly Highway 18 south; former western end of Highway 18 concurrency; Highway 401 exit 1; Highway 401 extension to Gordie Howe International Bridge
0.6	0.37	Matchette Road	Westbound exit and eastbound entrance
1.4	0.87	Highway 401 west (Herb Gray Parkway)	Westbound exit and eastbound entrance; Highway 401 exit 2
2.7	1.7	Highway 3 (Huron Church Road) – Ambassador Bridge, United States	Former Highway 18 / Highway 2 terminus; former eastern end of Highway 18 concurrency; former western end of Highway 2 concurrency
4.2	2.6	Dominion Boulevard	
5.3	3.3	Dougall Avenue	Formerly Highway 3B; to Detroit–Windsor tunnel
6.1	3.8	Howard Avenue	
8.3	5.2	Walker Road	Westbound exit via Central Avenue; access to Windsor International Airport
9.3	5.8	Central Avenue	Access to Windsor International Airport
11.9	7.4	Jefferson Boulevard	Eastbound exit and westbound entrance
13.0	8.1	Lauzon Parkway	Separate ramps for Lauzon Parkway South and Lauzon Parkway North
15.4	9.6	County Road 43 south (Banwell Road) County Road 22 east (Pike Creek Bypass) – Tecumseh	At-grade intersection with replacement Parclo interchange set to open in 2028; continues as County Road 22 east
1.000 mi = 1.609 km; 1.000 km = 0.621 mi: Incomplete access; Route transition

== See also ==
- List of numbered roads in Essex County
