= Paul Martin Sr. Building =

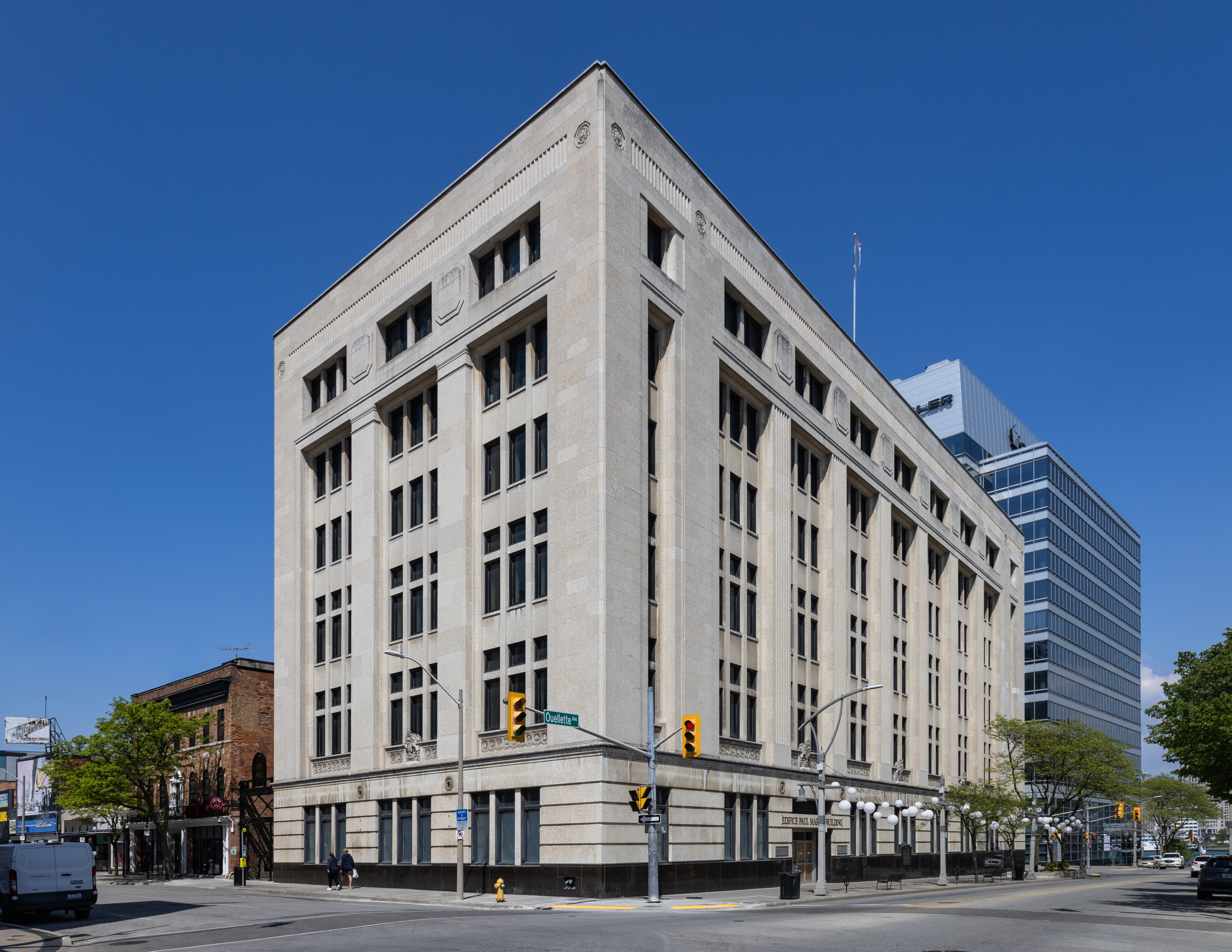
- Interactive map of the Paul Martin Sr. Building area

General information
- Type: Office
- Architectural style: Art Deco
- Location: 185 Ouellette Avenue; Windsor, Ontario; N9A 4H7
- Coordinates: 42°19′6.7″N 83°2′23.9″W
- Completed: 1933

Technical details
- Floor count: 6

Design and construction
- Architects: Sheppard & Masson with John E. Trace & G. Guller-Colthurst

The Paul Martin Sr. Building is a 6-storey Art deco low-rise office building in Windsor, Ontario, Canada, located on the west side of Ouellette Avenue between Chatham Street and Pitt Streets.

== Building ==
The building, originally known as the Dominion Public Building, was built in 1932 and was designed by local architects Sheppard & Masson with John E. Trace & G. Guller-Colthurst to house Canada Post. Canada Post occupied the basement through to the fifth floor with other federal offices on the sixth floor.

It is named after Paul Martin Sr., father of former Prime Minister of Canada, Paul Martin. The building is also known by its French name "Edifice Paul Martin". The building was renamed on November 18, 1994, by the Honourable Herb Gray, the Honourable David Charles Dingwall and the Honourable Paul Martin.

=== Renovations ===
Major renovations along with a four-storey addition were completed in 1959 to expand post office operations. Various government departments remained on the sixth floor.

In 2012 overhead protection hoarding was installed along the north, east and south facades to protect the public from any falling stones. The building's limestone façade was in very poor condition and contained many chips and cracks visible from the street. Repairs were completed in 2017 by the federal government before selling the building to the City of Windsor.

=== Heritage Designation ===
The City of Windsor designated the building as heritage under the Ontario Heritage Act in 2013. Some exterior features contributing to the heritage value are the bronze plaques identifying "Post Office" and "Customs and Excise", a stone band above the first floor with carved "Dominion Public Building" and "Post Office" along with Canadian Crests.

=== Ownership ===
Built and owned by the Government of Canada until sold to the City of Windsor for $10.00 in 2019. The Windsor Public Library has been temporarily relocated to the building after selling their former location to the Downtown Mission. They have renovated the first and second floor in the 1959 addition. No long term use has been found for the building.
