= James Dougall =

Canadian politician (1810-1888)

- Born: September 21, 1810; Paisley, Scotland
- Died: April 5, 1888 (aged 77); Windsor, Ontario, Canada
- Occupation: merchant
- Known for: Dougall Avenue and Dougall Parkway
- Spouses: Suzanne Baby; Elizabeth Marcon
- Children: 5 sons and 4 daughters
- Relatives: John Dougall (brother); François Baby (father-in-law)

James Dougall (September 21, 1810 – April 5, 1888) was a Scottish-Canadian politician, merchant, and horticulturalist.

== Early life ==
He was born in Paisley, Scotland in 1810. In 1826, at the age of 16, due to the economic conditions of Scotland at the time, James was sent to Canada by his father John. He and his brother John Dougall began by the selling of dry goods, first in Quebec, and later moving the business to Montreal and York, now known as Toronto. They were later joined by their father in 1828.

== Ontario ==
In 1830, he moved to Windsor, Ontario, and began to make connections in the area, aiding his business. He married Suzanne Baby, daughter of François Baby, in 1832. With his wife Suzanne, he had five sons and two daughters. The marriage to Suzanne gave him a quite a strong connection to the local area, and it aided him to successfully open his first general store, "Dougall’s Emporium", in Windsor, near the ferry dock. Dougall helped in subsidizing the land of his father-in-law, and opened his store near the ferry dock.

In 1837, he became a magistrate for the area. With the title given to him, he was responsible for naming the city. Thus, Dougall is responsible for the naming of the current city of Windsor, Ontario. Canada was under British reign at the time, and due to this a name with ties to Britain had to be chosen, and so came the name of Windsor. By 1837, his business was flourishing, and by 1840, he had two ferries operating across the Detroit River.

In 1837-1838, he aided in the defense of Windsor against a rebellion from a group of individuals from Detroit. He purchased guns, and provided financial aid to the area. This is known as the Patriot War, or the Battle of Windsor.

After 1840, Dougall began funding nurseries in Windsor and the surrounding areas. His passion for horticulture grew from simple fruit trees, to small fruits and the plantation of flowers and plants in colder areas. Dougall funded several nurseries over the years.

== Political career ==
Dougall’s life in Windsor had a political aspect as well. Windsor attained Village status in 1854, and through this occurrence, Dougall became a member of the first council established in 1858. Dougall also became the first "elected" mayor of Windsor in 1859 and served until 1861. Six years later, in 1867, he was elected to a second term, and served until 1869. While living in Windsor and the surrounding area, he was active in many of the events of the community.

In 1864, Dougall remarried to Elizabeth Marcon, and had two daughters. The same year, Dougall was elected as the head of the school board, and held that position for the rest of his days.

== Legacy ==
In 1888, James Dougall died in Windsor, Ontario. He spent the bulk of his life in Windsor and in Anderdon County, near Amherstburg, Ontario. He was an active member of the community throughout his life. Dougall Avenue and Dougall Parkway in the city of Windsor are now named for him, while Victoria Street is named after his daughter.
