= Maidstone, Ontario =

Human settlement in Ontario, Canada

Coordinates: 42°12′34″N 82°53′15″W

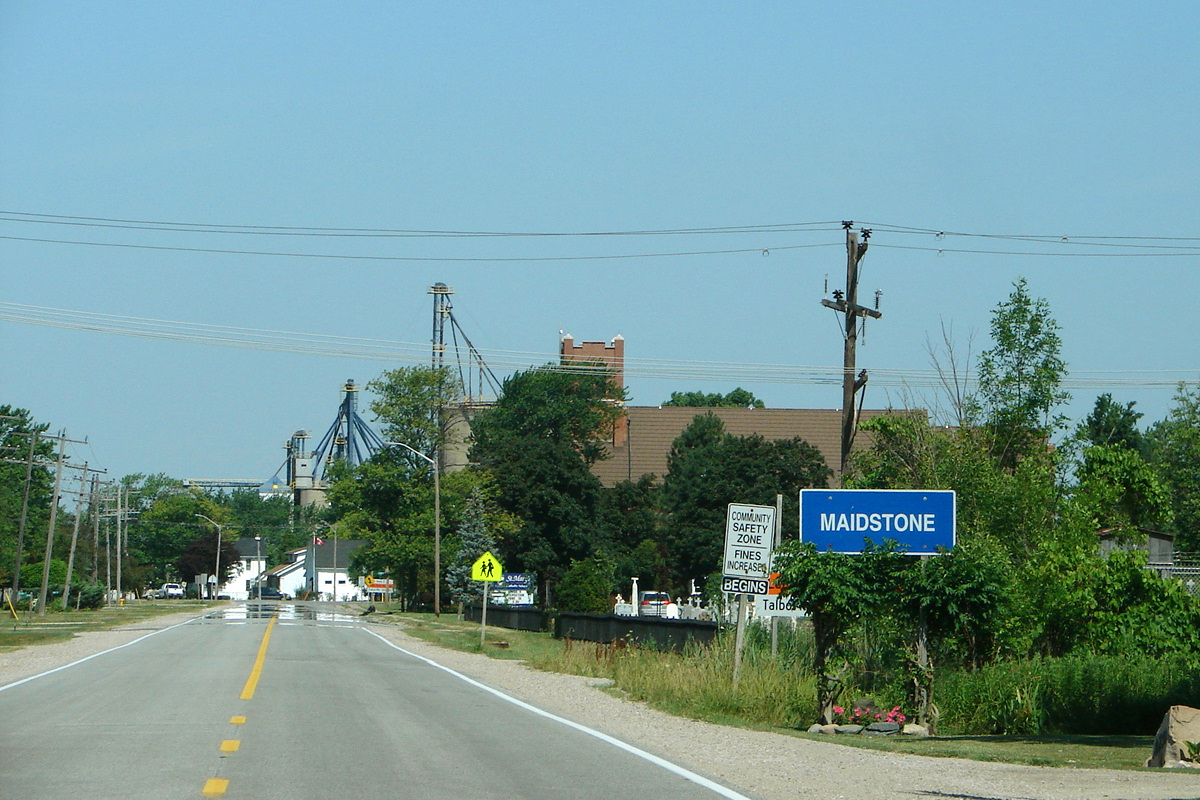
Maidstone

Maidstone, Ontario, is a small village on Essex County Road 34 in the municipality of Tecumseh, Ontario, Canada, since amalgamation in 1999. The community includes a post office, a school, baseball diamonds, a park, a church, a church hall, a community centre, a grain elevator, and a fuel service station located in the community.

The community was served by three main Provincial Highways in the past: Highway 3, until it was diverted onto its current alignment in 1977, Highway 114 (now just Malden Road, from CR 34/Former Highway 3, north to Middle Road, CR 46), and Highway 98, which was decommissioned in 1970, and became Essex County Road 46. It is also served by the very busy Manning Road (Essex CR 19).

== Education ==
Schools in Maidstone include:

- St. Mary Catholic Elementary School, operated by the Windsor-Essex Catholic District School Board

In the recent past -- 2011 -- there was a Maidstone Public School. Low enrollment and high cost of maintenance forced the Greater Essex County District School Board to sell the building and the eight-plus acre property to the "Saint Petka" Serbian Orthodox Mission Parish in April 2014.

== History ==
=== Early Settlement ===
Immigrants came by sailing vessel: the journey requiring about eleven weeks on the water. The voyage was generally by way of the United States. Some of the earliest settlers recorded along the Talbot Road("TR") include: Timothy Connell(1819-L299STR), James Houlihan(1824-L300STR), Jeremiah McCarthy(1825-L301STR), Michael McCarthy(1825-L301NTR), Richard McCarthy(1825-L299NTR), Abraham Halford(1825-L297STR), John Halford(1825-L297NTR), Cornelius Sexton(1828-L300NTR), Owen Sullivan(1830-L298NTR), Joseph Bennett(1832-L294STR), Patrick Tumblety(1833-L294NTR), Denis Collins(1834-L293STR). Earliest settlement names along the Middle Road("MR") include: James Cavanaugh(1826-L1NMR), Michael Cavanaugh(1827-L2NMR) Early references in the records of Assumption parish also include the names "the Irish Settlement" and "Maidstone Cross" to identify the settlement area. As early as 1831, Maidstone Cross was a mission of Assumption parish in Sandwich and was intermittently serviced by the priests - originally in the homes of the settlers. In 1836 Fr. Angus MacDonell built the first mission church(a log structure) at Maidstone Cross.

=== 1857-58 ===
An 1857-58 Canada Directory lists the following for Maidstone Cross: MAIDSTONE CROSS, - A small village situated in the Township of Sandwich and County of Essex. Distance from Sandwich by plank road 12 miles, and from Amherstburg 12 miles. Tri-weekly mail Population about 100. McGee, J.L., innkeeper. | Bennett, Charles R., tailor and general dealer | Brown, A. | Devlin, James, J.P., teacher. | Downing, D., J.P., farmer. Mitchell, James, blacksmith. | Ouelet, A., innkeeper | Reidy, A., innkeeper. | Toomey, M., postmaster, and general dealer.

=== 1866 ===
An 1866 Farmers Directory describes Maidstone Cross as follows: A post village, situated in the Township of Sandwich East, Talbot Street, on Lots 293 and 294, both N. and S. and twelve miles from Windsor and the same distance from Sandwich, the County Town. The village was laid out first by Patrick Tumblety, in the year 1835, (that is lot 294) and the other lot (293) was settled by Dennis Collins, in the year 1837, who opened the first hotel in that year, the next by John McGee, in 1850, who was also Postmaster, the Post Office being established in 1850 The first store was opened by John McGee. The Roman Catholic Church was erected here in 1836, a log building, it was replaced by a substantial brick building in 1850. The village now contains two stores, three blacksmith shops - two of the same, manufacture wagons - one butcher, two shoe shops, two hotels, one church, one St. Patrick's Society, and a good school; there is a saw mill within one mile west of the village, carried on by James Halford, on lot 296, Talbot Street, south. Mails daily, Thomas Moran, Postmaster. An Agricultural Society, organized January 1866, Patrick McNally, President; John Halford, Vice-President; James Devlin, Secretary; James Moran, Treasurer. Population about 50. Two stages call here daily from Leamington.

=== Mid-20th Century (Six Corners Development) ===
Six Corners — the intersection of County Roads 46 and 19 (formerly Highway 98) — began to develop commercially in the 1950s. In December 1954 local newspapers reported that “The Six Corners will soon be a village. Some new homes, a gas station, and other business places are being planned.”

In 1954 local young man Don Shanahan opened a service station on Highway 98 at Six Corners.

By the early 1970s the J and S Esso Service Station (also called J&S Service) stood at the northeast corner of the intersection. It was owned and operated by Jim Jewell. In September 1971 Jim Jewell publicly expressed concern about frequent accidents at the corner, fearing vehicles might crash into his gas pumps. The station was also active in community help — during the major blizzard of December 1974 it donated about 300 gallons of gasoline to stranded snowmobilers.

Other Maidstone history sources include: The Sandwich South Historical Society website https://sshistoricalsociety.ca/communities/ My Moynahan Genealogy Blog https://moynahangenealogy.blogspot.com/2020/06/who-was-henry-collins.html Ontario Rural Roots website https://www.ruralroutes.com/6229.html#
