= List of roads in Windsor, Ontario =

The road network in Windsor, Ontario is a grid system with elongated blocks, generally aligned with the Detroit River, with East-West roads running parallel to it, and North-South streets running perpendicular (90 Degrees) to it. This is an adoption from when French Canadian settlers first built farms and streets in the area. Many streets have French names in result, such as Lauzon Parkway, Marentette Avenue (a quiet residential street), Ouellette Avenue (considered by many Windsorites to be its "Main Street"), and Pelissier Street. The current street system of Windsor (grid with elongated blocks) reflects the French method of agricultural land division where the farms were long and narrow, fronting along the river (this originates from French methods of tax collection, with more taxes being paid by property owners with waterfront properties, thus why riverfront lots were usually narrow).

== Introduction ==
Most of the city is uniform in its grid, but a few neighbourhoods have their own system. Forest Glade and The Villages of Riverside were built recently (in the 1960s and 1970s, and have circular patterns, while Sandwich has its own grid roughly 45 degrees off from the rest of the city, in a triangle from Huron Church Road and the Detroit River, south to Tecumseh Road and Prince Road. This is due to the river turning southwest-ward just west of the Ambassador Bridge. Another major part of the city where the streets "jog" across Tecumseh Road is Fountain Bleu, when Tecumseh Road was the former city limit with the former Township of Sandwich South until the 1960s.

== Expressways ==
Windsor has two freeways, the E. C. Row Expressway and the Dougall Parkway.

Highway 401 skirts the City Limits from Provincial Rd (exit 14), to Cabana West/Todd Lane (exit 6), and enters the city in the far west end to Ojibway Pkwy (exit 1). Dougall Parkway is a former spur of Highway 401, and is a limited access freeway between the 401 and Howard Avenue, just north of Howard Avenue before it becomes Dougall Avenue.

There are a few other divided highways/dual carriageways with varying levels of development, access, and intersections, such as Ojibway Parkway, Lauzon Parkway, Ouellette Avenue, and Huron Church Road.

== Main East-West Roads ==
These main East-West arterial roads are listed from the Detroit River, heading towards the south:

- Riverside Drive
- University Avenue
- Wyandotte Street
- Tecumseh Road
- Eugenie Street (short, but very busy connector)
- E. C. Row Expressway
- Cabana Road/Division Road

== Other East-West Roads ==
- Erie Street
- Giles Boulevard
- Ottawa Street
- Shepherd Street
- Grand Marais Road/West Grand Boulevard
- Plymouth Road (originally built to direct traffic from the now-demolished Pillette Road Van plant away from residential areas to the north and east)
- Dougall Parkway (leads to Ontario Highway 401, serves South Windsor and Southwood Lakes subdivision)
- North Talbot Road
- Totten Street
- College Avenue (a busy truck route)
- Prince Road (continuation of Totten Street, meets up with Tecumseh Road)
- Forest Glade Drive
- Wildwood Drive

== Main North-South Roads ==
These main North-South arteries are listed from west to east:

- Sandwich Street
- Matchette Road
- Malden Road
- Huron Church Road (extremely busy connector linking Ontario Highway 401 to Ambassador Bridge and Interstate 75)
- Campbell Avenue/Dominion Boulevard (originally intended to become a freeway in the 1970s as a spur route from E.C. Row into downtown, anti-freeway sentiments by downtown and west side residents and businesses killed it)
- Dougall Avenue
- Ouellette Avenue
- McDougall Avenue
- Howard Avenue
- Provincial Road
- Walker Road
- Central Avenue
- Pillette Road
- Jefferson Boulevard
- Lauzon Road/Lauzon Parkway
- Banwell Road

== Other North-South Roads ==
These other North-South routes tend to be short, but busy, as they serve heavily built-up areas in Downtown and other areas:

- Victoria Avenue (notable for having some of the oldest houses in the city along it. It is a quiet downtown residential street otherwise)
- Drouillard Road/Chrysler Centre

Many of these roads in Windsor pass by Big Three Automaker plants, such as Ford Motor Company of Canada, General Motors Canada and Chrysler Canada, which is why they are so busy.

== See also ==
- List of roads in Essex County, Ontario
