= Windsor Public Library =

- Location: 400 City Hall Square East, Windsor, Ontario
- Established: 1894
- Branches: 10

Access and use
- Circulation: 1,310,016 (2024)
- Population served: 229,660
- Members: 88,374 (2024)

Other information
- Budget: $9,111,832 (2024)
- Director: Jennifer Knights (Chief Executive Officer)
- Website: www.windsorpubliclibrary.com

Windsor Public Library is a public library system in Windsor, Ontario, Canada. It has ten branches and serves the city of Windsor through Children's, Young Adult, and Adult programs, services and collections. The central branch is located at the Paul Martin Sr. Building on Ouellette Avenue in downtown Windsor.

== History ==
The year of 1894 marked the opening of Windsor's first free public library which was located in Lambie's Hall in the building that now stands as the former Windsor Star building. After one year of operation the library had 5,245 volumes available to the public. This library remained Windsor's sole library until the turn of the century when discussion began that the Lambie Hall Library was inadequate for the people of Windsor. On July 25, 1900 a formal request was placed to Andrew Carnegie to help establish a new library which would be up to date and would have the means to accommodate the people of Windsor. A CA$20,000 donation was received and a site was selected to begin the process of erecting Windsor's new library. The library was set to be built at the corner of Park and Victoria. Once construction began, it became clear that $20,000 was not a large enough budget and in June and July 1902, Mr. Carnegie took it upon himself to give a further $7,000 towards the project. Windsor's Carnegie Library officially opened its doors to the public on October 16, 1903. This library soon became the city's main reference library due to its vast collection of materials.

Again, Windsor came across the same problem which it had encountered before; as time passed, the library quickly became inadequate for the needs of the city. Built when Windsor had a population of 13,400 it was a revolutionary building which could serve up to 100,000 people, but by 1945 the population had almost reached 120,000. The quality of service that the Carnegie Library was able to offer was dwindling but the city was unable to make a change in location at this point.

In 1965, a proposal for the construction of a new downtown library was made that would cost CA$1,692,000. As Dennis B. Atkinson wrote to the Windsor Star in 1966, "It is a disgrace that a city the size of Windsor should have to struggle along with such a poor, out-of-date and cramped library." Though changes had been made to Carnegie Library in 1969 to improve accessibility to the building, provide extended hours, abolish some fees that had been put in place and coin-operated photocopying was made available to the public in order to enhance the all around state of the library. It was at this time in the mid 1960s that the Library Board made the decision that a new building was required in the post-war period and the citizens of Windsor heavily supported this idea.

By 1971 a site had been selected for the location of the downtown library. It was to be located on the east side of Ouellette Avenue on the site that was formerly the home to the Ursuline School of Music. The design for the new library was done by architects Johnson and McWhinnie who hailed from Windsor and the construction costs of their designed reached $24.88 per square foot. The construction of this building was to start as soon as financial approval was received from the Ontario Municipal Board. The expected total cost was $3 million. January 1972 marked the ground breaking ceremony of Windsor's Main Library. This library is to act as a resource center for the public of Windsor. An emphasis was placed on the multi-media approach with future possibility of change or advancement kept in mind. The library boasted two special services: The Languages Centre and the Bookstore. Some of the other services offered by the new library were as follows: an information centre, family reading centre, arts and recreation centre, literature and history section, film centre, science and technology section, philosophy, religion and social sciences, archives and assembly and meeting rooms with capacity for up to 300 people. The Carnegie Library and the new library erected in 1972 were not the only libraries available to the citizens of Windsor. By 1969, there were eight existing branches of the Windsor Public library and today there are nine. This figure does not include the community archives or museums.

== Services ==
- Information and reference services
- Access to full text databases
- Community information
- Internet access
- Reader's advisory services
- Programs for children, youth and adults
- Delivery to homebound individuals
- Interlibrary loan
- Free downloadable audiobooks

== Branches ==
The Windsor Public Library operates 10 branches across the city.

| Branch | Opened | Location | Notes |
|---|---|---|---|
| Central Branch | 1973 | 185 Ouellette Avenue (Paul Martin Sr. Building) | |
| Bridgeview Branch | 2002 | 1295 Campbell Avenue | |
| Budimir Branch | 1966 | 1310 Grand Marais Road West | |
| Fontainebleau Branch | 2005 | 3030 Rivard Avenue | |
| Forest Glade-Optimist Branch | 1988 | 3211 Forest Glade Drive | |
| John Muir Branch | 2019 | 363 Mill Street | |
| Local History Branch | 2019 | 3312 Sandwich Street | |
| Riverside Branch | 1995 | 6305 Wyandotte Street East | |
| Seminole Branch | 1953 | 4285 Seminole Street | |
| W.F. Chisholm Branch | 2017 | 1075 Ypres Avenue | |

== See also ==
- List of public libraries in Ontario
- List of Carnegie libraries in Canada
