= Ouellette Avenue =

Road in Windsor, Ontario, Canada

- Length: 4.5 km (2.8 mi)
- Location: Windsor
- North end: just north of Riverside Drive at the Riverfront Bike Trail
- South end: Dougall Avenue

Ouellette Avenue (most commonly pronounced by English speakers as 'Oh-Let' and by French-speakers as 'Well-et') is one of the main North-South Roads in Windsor, Ontario, and acts as its Main Street. The road diverges from Dougall Avenue south of Downtown Windsor, travelling northward over the Essex Terminal Railway/CP Rail tracks, before terminating at a turnaround and parking lot at Dieppe Gardens in Windsor's core.

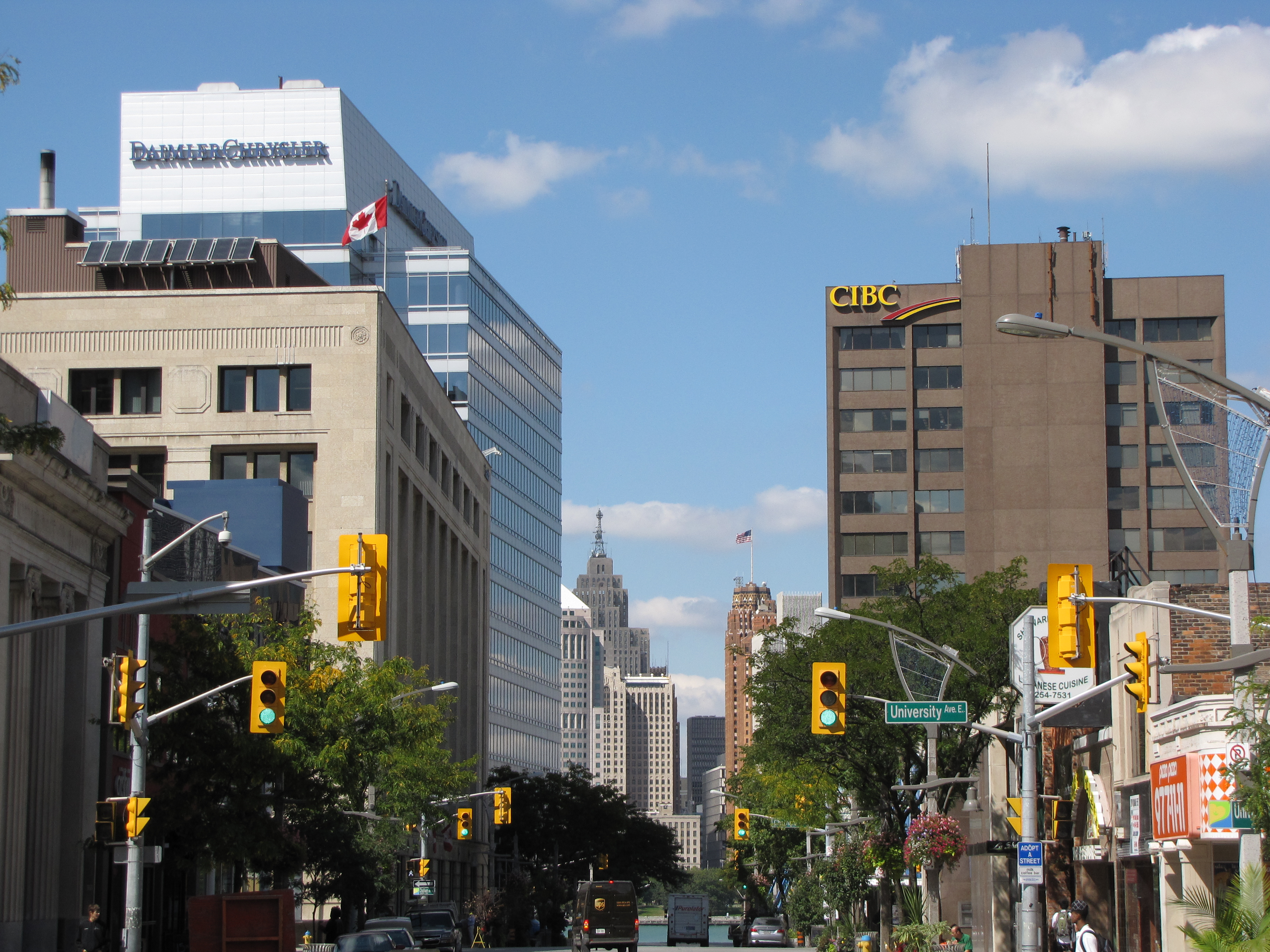
Ouellette Avenue, with Downtown Detroit in the background.

The road is 4-lanes for most of its length, narrowing down to two lanes north of Wyandotte Street. Its purpose is to divert traffic from the Ambassador Bridge (via Highway 3/Huron Church Road), by sending it to the Tunnel (Via Dougall Parkway, Dougall Avenue, to the Detroit-Windsor Tunnel, along Wyandotte Street to its Canadian terminus at Goyeau Street. Traffic onward into the United States generally continues onto Woodward Avenue, Detroit's "Main Street", which lies along the same alignment as Ouellette.

The road is quite busy and is used mostly by cars, as trucks longer than 45 feet cannot fit around the curve on the American side of the Detroit Tunnel, and the Ambassador Bridge tends to be clogged.

== History ==
Ouellette Avenue first began as the original alignment of Highway 3 from 1920, terminating at the International Ferry Dock between Ouellette Avenue and Dougall Avenue, in downtown Windsor. This remained until July 10, 1929, when the Ambassador Bridge opened. Highway 3 was re-routed along the newly constructed Huron Church Road to the bridge, and Ouellette Avenue was re-designated as Highway 3A (Windsor). This lasted until 1935, when it was re-designated as Highway 3B (Windsor).

In 1962, the City of Windsor re-aligned Ouellette Avenue to flow into Dougall Avenue directly, instead of having Highway 3B traffic head north along Dougall Avenue, then making a short east-bound jog on Tecumseh Road before continuing left (north) on Ouellette Ave. The former alignment remained as Ouellette Avenue, while the new alignment became "Ouellette Place". Four years later, it was designated as a Connecting Link, enabling Windsor to receive monetary and mechanical/paving assistance in maintaining the road, and to continue to sign it as Highway 3B, should it be downloaded. Though it was officially turned back in 1975, the connecting link status remained in place until January 1, 1998, when the connecting link status was repealed, and the road was officially retired as a provincially-maintained highway.

== Today ==
Ouellette Avenue serves as an access to downtown Windsor and to the Detroit-Windsor Tunnel. The road is also the main path for the Windsor-Detroit International Freedom Festival's Parade, and for the Windsor Jaycees Santa Claus Parade.
