= Ontario Highway 3B =

Former Ontario provincial highway

King's Highway 3B

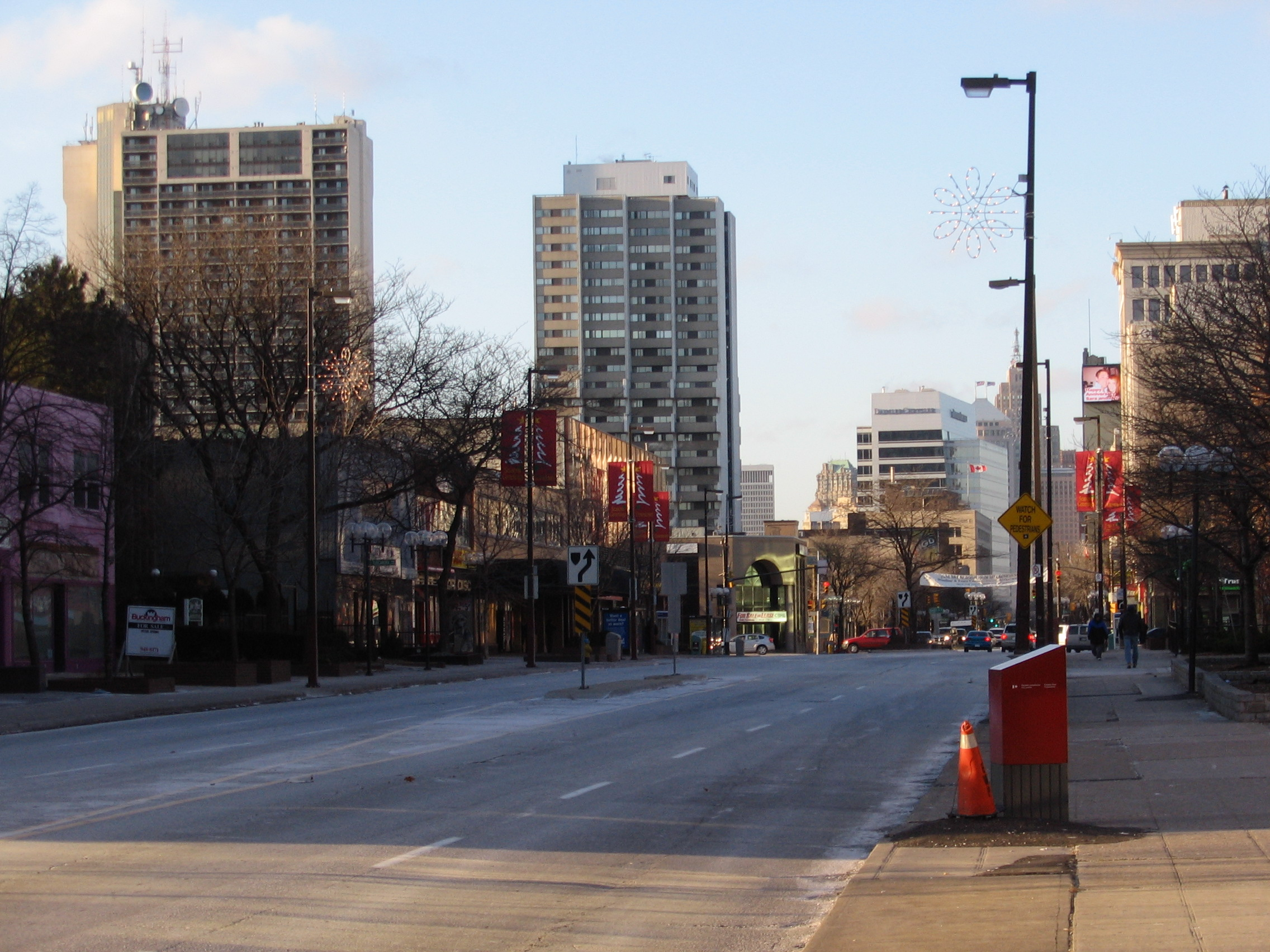
- View looking north on Ouellette Avenue, a former part of Highway 3B

Route information
- Maintained by City of Windsor
- Length: 11 km (6.8 mi)
- Existed: 1935–1998

Location
- Country: Canada
- Province: Ontario
- Counties: Essex

Highway system
- Ontario provincial highways; Current; Former; 400-series
← Highway 3	→ Highway 4

King's Highway 3B, commonly referred to as Highway 3B, was a provincially maintained highway within Windsor, in the Canadian province of Ontario. Its purpose was to link Highway 3 and Highway 401 with the Detroit–Windsor Tunnel and downtown Windsor. Highway 3B was routed along the city streets of Ouellette Avenue, Ouellette Place, Howard Avenue, and Dougall Avenue.

== Route description ==
The former route of Highway 3B begins at the intersection of Howard Avenue and Highway 3, and heads due north, towards the interchange with Dougall Parkway. From there, the route turns east onto Dougall Avenue which turns northwestward and intersects Essex County Road 42 (Cabana Road).

At E.C. Row Expressway, the road gains a central divider, but has traffic lights for full access to and from the freeway. It then travels under the CN Rail tracks (still with a central reservation), and along the curve to Ouellette Avenue. It continues north before terminating at the intersection with Wyandotte Street in downtown Windsor, just two blocks from the Detroit–Windsor Tunnel.

== History ==
Highway 3B was originally named Highway 3A, when its parent road (Highway 3) was re-routed to meet the newly finished Ambassador Bridge. The original alignment was then named Highway 3A. In 1935, the road was renamed Highway 3B. This road originally travelled along Howard Avenue and Dougall Avenue, before jogging east along Tecumseh Road to Ouellette Avenue, and thenceforth continuing to downtown Windsor's ferry docks. When the Detroit–Windsor Tunnel was completed in 1930, the Highway was truncated about one kilometre from the ferry docks, at the intersection of Ouellette Avenue and London Street (now University Avenue), just two blocks from the tunnel entrance at Goyeau Street.

When the Ouellette Avenue curve was constructed in 1963, the portion north of the curve along Dougall Avenue and Tecumseh Road was reverted to municipal control, and the designation of Highway 3B was placed on the re-aligned curve leading along Dougall Avenue and Ouellette Avenue. In 1966, the road was also designated as a connecting link. This meant that while Windsor would have more responsibility in maintaining and repairing the road, the Ministry of Transportation would still contribute and help. The road's status as a provincial highway was repealed in 1975, but the connecting link agreement was kept, allowing the road to still be signed as Highway 3B.

As part of a series of budget cuts initiated by premier Mike Harris under his Common Sense Revolution platform in 1995, numerous highways deemed to no longer be of significance to the provincial network were decommissioned and responsibility for the routes transferred to a lower level of government, a process referred to as downloading. As it generally served a local function, Highway 3B was downloaded in its entirety on January 1, 1998, and transferred to the city of Windsor. Since then, it has been known as Ouellette Avenue, Ouellette Place, Howard Avenue, and Dougall Avenue.
