= Dougall Avenue =

Road in Ontario, Canada

- Length: 8 km (5.0 mi)
- Location: Windsor, Essex County
- North end: University Avenue
- South end: Dougall Parkway/Howard Avenue interchange

Dougall Avenue is a busy four-lane urban arterial road, linking Downtown Windsor, with South Windsor and Highway 401. The road is a minimum of four lanes for its entire length, and is among Windsor's busiest, with an Average Annual Daily Traffic amount of 35,000 vehicles per day from Eugenie Street to Cabana Road.

== History ==
The road was part of the original alignment of Highway 3 from 1917 to 1929, when Highway 3 was re-aligned onto the newly built Huron Church Road to serve the also newly constructed Ambassador Bridge. Dougall Avenue then became Highway 3A. In 1935, the provincial highway was re-labelled as Highway 3B. In 1962, Ouellette Avenue was re-aligned south of Eugenie Street to allow better direct access to and from Dougall Avenue, and to eliminate a short 3-block "jog" east along Tecumseh Road near downtown. Highway 3B was re-aligned onto Ouelette Place (the "curve" along Ouellette Avenue) and Ouellette Avenue, terminating in Downtown Windsor. This curve was finished and opened in 1963.

In 1966, the road was also designated as a connecting link. This meant that while Windsor would have more responsibility in maintaining and repairing the road, the Ministry of Transportation would still contribute and help. The road's status as a provincial highway was repealed in 1975, but the connecting link agreement was kept, allowing the road to still be signed as Highway 3B, to reduce confusion among motorists. The connecting link was ultimately repealed in 1998.

== Route description ==
=== Dougall Parkway to Ouellette Place ===
The road officially begins at the interchange with Howard Avenue, with a small former alignment in place to serve several homes, named "Dougall Place". The road narrows from a four-lane dual carriageway (speed limit of 80 km/h or 50 mph) to a four-lane undivided urban arterial road, with a speed limit of 60 km/h (40 mph). The roadway is heavily built-up on all sides, with mostly shopping plazas and businesses, but with houses as well. The largest of plaza is the South Windsor Walmart (located south of E. C. Row Expressway).

North of the Walmart and interchange with E.C. Row Expressway, the road becomes a narrowly divided four-lane arterial road, passing under 1 railway overpass, as well as passing next to the Zalev Brothers' Scrap Yard. It is here, that Dougall Road continues north, but all lanes default onto Ouellette Place.

=== Intersection with Ouelette Place ===
The intersection of Ouellette Place is very dangerous (among the most dangerous in the entire city), as the shape and angle of the intersection (and the reduced visibility from 1 active and 2 removed railroad overpasses) draws the attention of motorists behind them when trying to continue straight (by making a left-turn) on Dougall Avenue, or to make a left-turn onto Ouellette Place northbound from Dougall Avenue southbound. The road was designed to keep the majority of traffic onto Ouellette Avenue, and this has been the cause of many accidents, such as rear-end collisions. There have been petitions now and then for Windsor City Council to fix the intersection or close off access to Dougall Avenue entirely (and have signs directing motorists that want to access Dougall Avenue to use Eugenie Street).

=== North of Ouellette Place ===
North of Ouellette Place, the road is far quieter, though still has a fair amount of traffic around Dorwin Plaza, Superstore and the Cogeco Cable offices. Most of the traffic on this street uses Eugenie Street to get to and from Ouellette Place, and to serve the businesses along it. After crossing the CP Rail and Essex Terminal Railway tracks, the road becomes a two-lane residential collector road with on-street parking, with two-way access terminating at the intersection of Tecumseh Road. North of this street, the road is southbound-only, and is entirely residential in nature, with very low traffic volumes.

== Truck traffic issues ==
In recent months, the Windsor Star has reported that heavy international transport truck traffic on the road has tripled (not counting those trucks making deliveries to stores and locations along the road) since trucks were banned by a 2003 city bylaw from using Wyandotte Street as a "short cut" to the Ambassador Bridge in an attempt to avoid the very-busy Huron Church Road. Councillor Drew Dilkens has requested for the bylaw to be extended to include Dougall Avenue between Highway 401 (including Dougall Parkway) and E. C. Row Expressway (with exceptions for trucks making local deliveries), citing studies done that show nearly all the trucks on the road use Dougall Avenue to approach E. C. Row Expressway, then to Huron Church Road (public opinion has traditionally been strong on keeping international truck traffic off of E.C. Row) as it already handles a large number of commuter traffic and is the fastest way to cross the city.
