= Dougall Parkway =

Municipal expressway in Windsor, Ontario

- Highway 401 (north leg)

Route information
- Length: 1.6 km (0.99 mi)

Major junctions
- East end: Highway 401
- West end: Interchange with Dougall Avenue and Howard Avenue

Location
- Country: Canada
- Province: Ontario
- Counties: Essex County, Ontario
- Major cities: Windsor

Highway system
- Ontario municipal expressways
(in alphabetical order)
← Don Valley Parkway	Dougall Parkway	E. C. Row Expressway →

Dougall Parkway is a municipal expressway in Windsor, Ontario. The expressway acts as an extension of Dougall Avenue and serves traffic heading towards the Windsor city-centre and the Detroit–Windsor Tunnel. The road is named for former mayor of Windsor James Dougall.

== Route description ==
Dougall Parkway is a short 1.6 kilometres (0.99 mi) controlled-access highway that begins after connecting ramps split off of Highway 401. From the split, the expressway travels in a west-northwest direction having interchanges with 6th Concession Road and Howard Avenue. It is at the intersection when the expressway passes under Howard Avenue where it transitions into Dougall Avenue.

== History ==
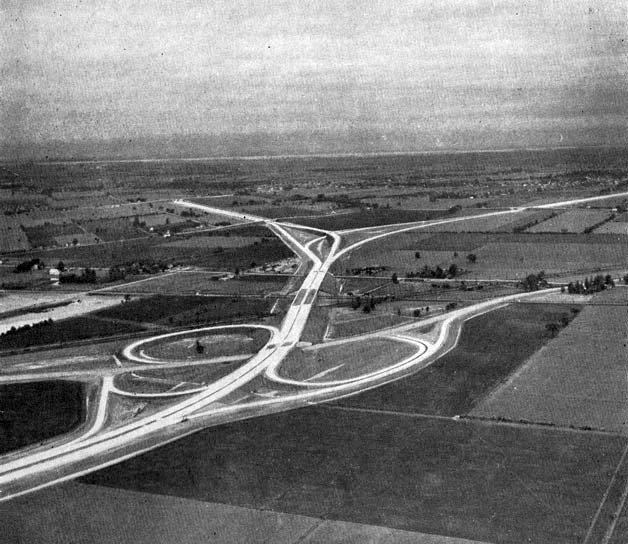
Highway 401 facing southwest in 1958. The interchange with former Highway 98 is in the foreground and the split at Dougall Parkway is in the background.

Dougall Parkway was constructed as one of the two western forks of Highway 401 in the mid-1950s, connecting Highway 401 with Highway 3B (Howard Avenue). Somewhat confusingly, Dougall Parkway was officially numbered as Highway 401 along with the other leg of the fork, with Dougall Parkway being the north leg.

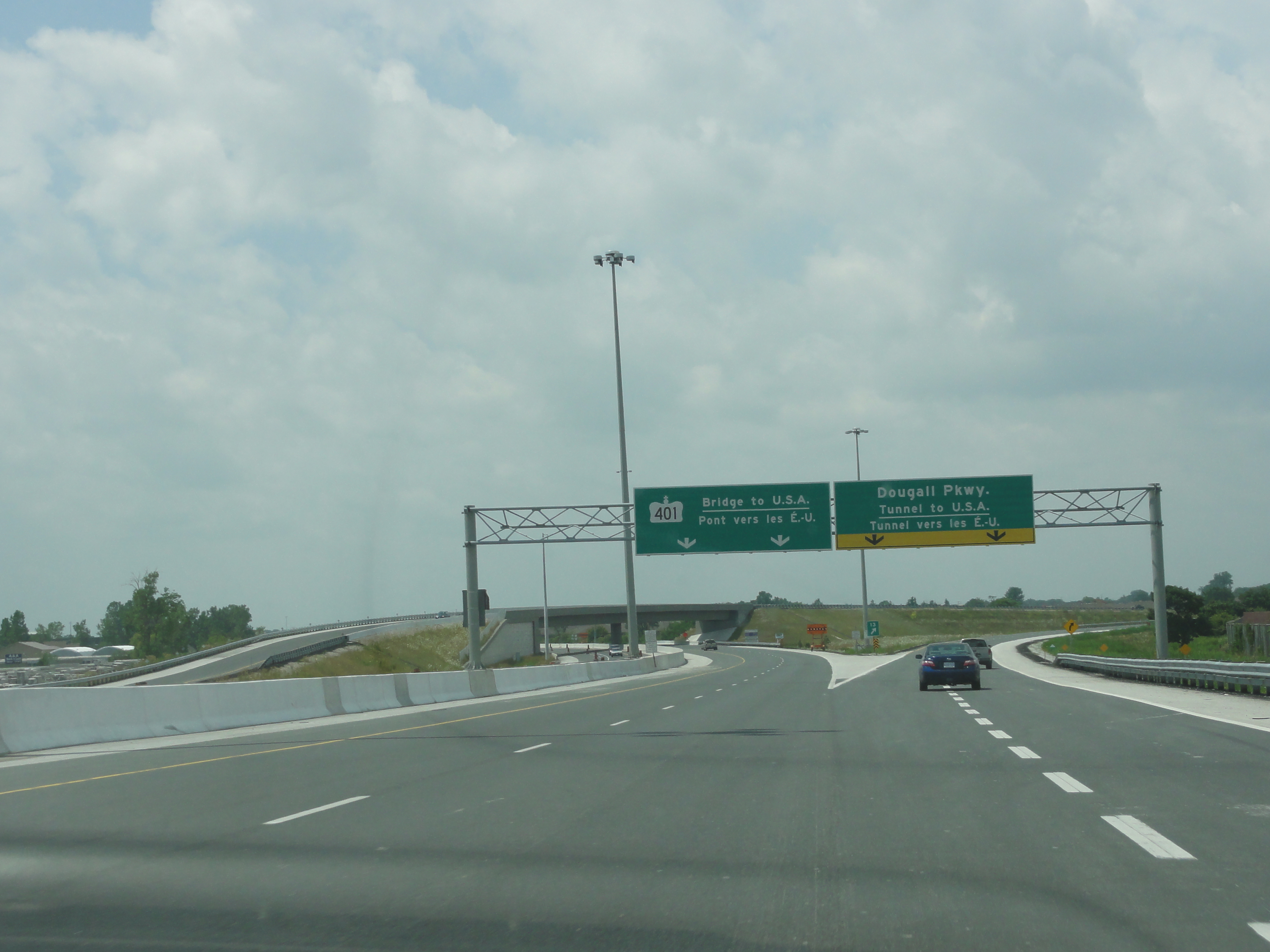
Highway 401 in Windsor near its western terminus with the Dougall Parkway.

In 2008 to 2010, as part of the reconstruction of the section of Highway 401 from Dougall Parkway to Provincial Road, the Dougall Parkway split with Highway 401 was reconfigured, replacing a one-lane 1950s-era underpass tunnel with a modern high-speed flyover ramp.

== Exit list ==
The following table lists the major junctions along Dougall Parkway, as noted by the City of Windsor. The entire route is located in Windsor, Ontario.

km	mi	Destinations	Notes
0.0	0.0	Dougall Avenue Howard Avenue	Expressway ends; continues west as Dougall Avenue
1.5	0.93	6th Concession Road	Eastbound exit and westbound entrance
1.6	0.99	Highway 401 east – London, Toronto	Eastern terminus; eastbound exit and westbound entrance
1.000 mi = 1.609 km; 1.000 km = 0.621 mi: Incomplete access; Route transition
