= Riverside, Windsor =

Coordinates: 42°19′40″N 82°56′59″W

Riverside is a neighbourhood on the eastern edge of Windsor, Ontario, in Canada. It is best defined by Riverside Drive, a waterfront road which runs parallel to the Detroit River. The western boundary is approximately Westminster Boulevard running easterly to Rendezvous Shores and the Windsor/Tecumseh town line. That town line is formally defined by a drainage ditch to the eastern side of the Rendezvous property.

Rendezvous Shores is a recent development on the lands which were a large grass field between a marine basin and the Rendezvous Tavern. The Tavern was approximately 350 metres (1,150 feet) south of the Lake St. Clair shore and the marine basin, while the adjoining properties were a maximum of roughly 250 metres (800 feet); thus, the marine basin jutted out into the southwest corner of Lake St. Clair. Most of the structure was break wall which was later landfilled to the east, and on most marine charts is referred to as Askin's Point.

Riverside was a town until it was annexed by Windsor on January 1, 1966. It truly extends all the way to Tecumseh on the eastern side, but the 3 mile (4.8 km) stretch along Riverside Drive of waterfront property and farms would retrospectively be called a hamlet in the city plans.

== Climate ==
Climate data for Windsor (Riverside), 1981−2010 normals, extremes 1866–present
Month	Jan	Feb	Mar	Apr	May	Jun	Jul	Aug	Sep	Oct	Nov	Dec	Year
Record high °C (°F)	19.4 (66.9)	22.0 (71.6)	28.5 (83.3)	32.2 (90.0)	35.0 (95.0)	36.7 (98.1)	39.0 (102.2)	38.5 (101.3)	38.3 (100.9)	32.5 (90.5)	25.5 (77.9)	21.0 (69.8)	39.0 (102.2)
Mean daily maximum °C (°F)	0.4 (32.7)	2.9 (37.2)	7.7 (45.9)	14.9 (58.8)	20.9 (69.6)	27.0 (80.6)	29.0 (84.2)	27.8 (82.0)	24.3 (75.7)	16.8 (62.2)	9.7 (49.5)	3.1 (37.6)	15.4 (59.7)
Daily mean °C (°F)	−3 (27)	−1.1 (30.0)	3.0 (37.4)	9.4 (48.9)	15.3 (59.5)	21.4 (70.5)	23.6 (74.5)	22.7 (72.9)	18.9 (66.0)	12.1 (53.8)	5.9 (42.6)	0.0 (32.0)	10.7 (51.3)
Mean daily minimum °C (°F)	−6.4 (20.5)	−5.1 (22.8)	−1.8 (28.8)	3.9 (39.0)	9.6 (49.3)	15.7 (60.3)	18.1 (64.6)	17.6 (63.7)	13.4 (56.1)	7.3 (45.1)	2.1 (35.8)	−3.1 (26.4)	6.0 (42.8)
Record low °C (°F)	−32.8 (−27.0)	−29.4 (−20.9)	−24.4 (−11.9)	−13.3 (8.1)	−3.3 (26.1)	2.8 (37.0)	4.4 (39.9)	5.0 (41.0)	−1.1 (30.0)	−7.2 (19.0)	−18.9 (−2.0)	−29.4 (−20.9)	−32.8 (−27.0)
Average precipitation mm (inches)	72.8 (2.87)	59.2 (2.33)	62.3 (2.45)	84.6 (3.33)	94.0 (3.70)	67.5 (2.66)	81.3 (3.20)	78.3 (3.08)	77.4 (3.05)	65.9 (2.59)	69.1 (2.72)	61.0 (2.40)	873.3 (34.38)
Average rainfall mm (inches)	35.6 (1.40)	38.9 (1.53)	43.3 (1.70)	78.3 (3.08)	94.0 (3.70)	67.5 (2.66)	81.3 (3.20)	78.3 (3.08)	77.4 (3.05)	65.9 (2.59)	65.1 (2.56)	40.4 (1.59)	765.8 (30.15)
Average snowfall cm (inches)	37.2 (14.6)	20.3 (8.0)	19.0 (7.5)	6.4 (2.5)	0.0 (0.0)	0.0 (0.0)	0.0 (0.0)	0.0 (0.0)	0.0 (0.0)	0.0 (0.0)	4.1 (1.6)	20.6 (8.1)	107.5 (42.3)
Average precipitation days (≥ 0.2 mm)	15.0	10.8	12.1	13.0	14.1	10.7	11.2	10.2	8.6	9.6	11.7	14.1	141.0
Average rainy days (≥ 0.2 mm)	6.1	5.4	7.9	12.2	14.1	10.7	11.2	10.2	8.6	9.6	10.0	7.7	113.6
Average snowy days (≥ 0.2 cm)	10.7	6.6	5.5	1.5	0.0	0.0	0.0	0.0	0.0	0.0	2.2	7.9	34.3
Source: Environment Canada

== Historical ==
Prohibition had a sizable influence on this area. The proximity to the monied interests of the U.S. led to the flourishing of several taverns that served not only as watering holes but as ties for American interests to secure alcohol. A party atmosphere persists to this day. Summer weekends still find the eastern end of Riverside Drive heavily used as many of Windsor's residents take part in this spirit and a drive through Riverside has the same draw today as it has had since the dawn of the Motor City.

Grand Taverns of Riverside

- Edgewater Thomas Inn
- Island View Tavern (known as Abars)
- Rendezvous Tavern
- Menard's Tavern
- Lauzon Stop House
- Wolf's Hotel

The history of the Town of Riverside (1921 to 1966) has been published and recently released by local historian Richard A. Fullerton.
