= Detroit–Windsor Tunnel =

International tunnel between United States and Canada

Coordinates: 42°19′28.21″N 83°2′24.19″W

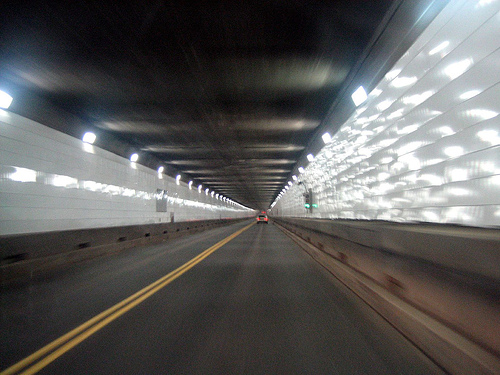
- Interactive map of Detroit–Windsor Tunnel

Overview
- Status: Open
- Crosses: Detroit River
- Start: Detroit, Michigan, U.S
- End: Windsor, Ontario, Canada

Operation
- Work began: 1928 (98 years ago)
- Opened: November 3, 1930 (96 years ago)
- Owner: Cities of Detroit and Windsor
- Operator: Detroit-Windsor Tunnel Company, LLC (Detroit Plaza) & Windsor Detroit Borderlink Limited (Windsor Plaza)
- Traffic: Automotive
- Toll: C$8.25 (autos travelling into US); US$9.00 (autos travelling into Canada)
- Vehicles per day: 12,000

Technical
- Design engineer: Parsons, Klapp, Brinckerhoff & Douglas
- Length: 5,160 feet (1,570 m)
- No. of lanes: 2
- Tunnel clearance: 12 feet 8 inches (3.86 m)
- Width: 22 feet (6.7 m)
- Depth below water: 45 feet (14 m)

The Detroit–Windsor Tunnel (French: tunnel de Détroit-Windsor), formerly known as the Detroit–Canada Tunnel, is a highway tunnel that runs under the Detroit River to connect Detroit, Michigan, United States, and Windsor, Ontario, Canada.

Before the Gordie Howe International Bridge opened in 2026, it was the second-busiest crossing between the United States and Canada after the Ambassador Bridge, which also connects the two cities.

== Overview ==
The tunnel is 5,160 feet (1,573 m) long (nearly a mile). At its lowest point, the two-lane roadway is 75 feet (23 m) below the river surface. There is a wide no-anchor zone enforced on river traffic around the tunnel.

The tunnel has three main levels. The bottom level brings in fresh air under pressure, which is forced into the mid level, where the traffic lanes are located. The ventilation system forces vehicle exhaust into the third level, which is then vented at each end of the tunnel.

== History ==
=== Construction ===
Construction began on the tunnel in the summer of 1928.

The Detroit–Windsor Tunnel was built by the firm Parsons, Klapp, Brinckerhoff and Douglas (the same firm that built the Holland Tunnel). The executive engineer was Burnside A. Value, the engineer of design was Norwegian-American engineer Søren Anton Thoresen, while fellow Norwegian-American Ole Singstad consulted, and designed the ventilation.

Three different methods were used to construct the tunnel. The approaches were constructed using the cut-and-cover method. Beyond the approaches, a tunneling shield method was used to construct hand-bored tunnels. Most of the river section used the immersed tube method in which steam-powered dredgers dug a trench in the river bottom and then covered over with 4 to 20 feet (1.2 to 6.1 m) of mud. The nine 250 feet (76 m)-long tubes measured 35 feet (11 m) in diameter.

The Detroit–Windsor Tunnel was completed in 1930 at a total cost of approximately $25 million (around $383 million in 2025 dollars). It was the third underwater vehicular tunnel constructed in the United States, following the Holland Tunnel, between Jersey City, New Jersey, and downtown Manhattan, New York, and the Posey Tube, between Oakland and Alameda, California.

Its creation followed the opening of cross-border rail freight tunnels including the St. Clair Tunnel between Port Huron, Michigan, and Sarnia, Ontario, in 1891 and the Michigan Central Railway Tunnel between Detroit and Windsor in 1910.

=== Operations since 2007 ===
In 2007, billionaire Manuel Moroun, owner of the nearby Ambassador Bridge, attempted to purchase the American side of the tunnel. In 2008, the City of Windsor and mayor Eddie Francis controversially attempted to purchase the American side for $75 million as part of a loan package with Detroit, but the deal fell through after a scandal involving then-Detroit Mayor Kwame Kilpatrick.

Soon afterward, the city's finances were badly hit in a recession and the tunnel's future was in question. Following Detroit's July 2013 bankruptcy filing, Francis said Windsor would again consider purchasing Detroit's half of the tunnel if it was offered for sale.

On July 25, 2013, the lessor, manager and operator of the tunnel, Detroit Windsor Tunnel LLC, and its parent company, American Roads, LLC, voluntarily filed for chapter 11 bankruptcy protection in the United States Bankruptcy Court for the Southern District of New York. The American lease was eventually purchased by Syncora Guarantee, a Bermuda-based insurance company. Soon afterward, the lease with Detroit was extended to 2040. Both Syncora and Windsor retained the Windsor-Detroit Tunnel Corporation to manage the daily operations and upkeep of the tunnel. In May 2018, Syncora sold its interest in American Roads, LLC for $220 million to DIF Capital Partners, a Dutch-based investment fund management company specializing in infrastructure assets.

A $21.6 million renovation of the tunnel began in October 2017 to replace the aging concrete ceiling, along with other improvements to the infrastructure. Completion of the project was initially scheduled for June 2018, but is ongoing as of 2021.

== Usage ==
The Detroit–Windsor Tunnel crosses the Canada–United States border; an International Boundary Commission plaque marking the boundary in the tunnel is between flags of the two countries. Until the opening of the Gordie Howe International Bridge in 2026, the tunnel was the second-busiest crossing between the United States and Canada. A 2004 Border Transportation Partnership study showed that 150,000 jobs in the region and $13 billion (U.S.) in annual production depend on the Windsor-Detroit international border crossing. Between 2001 and 2005, profits from the tunnel peaked, with the cities receiving over $6 million annually. A steep decline in traffic eliminated profits from the tunnel from 2008 until 2012, with a modest recovery in the years since.

=== Traffic ===
Prior to 2026, about 13,000 vehicles a day use the tunnel despite having one lane in each direction and not allowing large trucks. Historically, the tunnel carried a smaller amount of commercial traffic than other nearby crossings because of physical and cargo restraints, as well as limits on accessing roadways. Passenger automobile traffic on the tunnel increased from 1972, until it peaked in 1999 at just under 10 million vehicle crossings annually. After 1999, automobile crossings through the tunnel declined, dropping under 5 million for the first time in over three decades in 2007. Traffic on the tunnel later recovered slightly in the following years when the economy began to improve after 2008.

Crossings of the Detroit River between Detroit, Michigan and Windsor, Ontario. Detroit is on the north bank of this stretch of river. Because Detroit is generally north and west of Windsor, people travelling from the United States to Canada travel south.
1 Detroit–Windsor Tunnel (1930)
2 Michigan Central Railway Tunnel (1910)
3 Ambassador Bridge (1929)
4 Gordie Howe International Bridge (2026)

=== Tolls ===
Tolls were last increased on the Canadian side in July 2021, 37% for those using Canadian currency and 11% using American currency. As of January 2026, standard tolls for non-commercial Canada-bound vehicles are US$9.00 while United States-bound tolls are C$8.25. For frequent crossers, the Nexpress Toll Card for cheaper rates. Commercial vehicles and buses are charged higher rates. Motorcycles, scooters and bicycles are prohibited.

== Features ==
=== Tunnel truck for disabled vehicles ===
When the tunnel first opened in the 1930s the operators had a unique rescue vehicle to tow out disabled vehicles without having to back in or turn around to perform this role. The vehicle had two drivers, one facing in the opposite direction of the other. The vehicle was driven in, the disabled vehicle was hooked up, then the driver facing the other way drove it out. This emergency vehicle also carried hoses, chemical fire extinguishers and 600 gallons of water.

=== CKLW, WJR and the tunnel ===
In the late 1960s, Windsor radio station CKLW AM 800 engineered a wiring setup which has allowed the station's signal to be heard clearly by automobiles traveling through the tunnel. Currently Detroit radio station WJR AM 760 can be heard clearly in the tunnel.

=== Ventilation ===
The upper and lower levels of the tunnel are used as exhaust and intake air ducts. One hundred-foot ventilation towers on both ends of the tunnel enable air exchange once every 90 seconds.

== Photo gallery ==
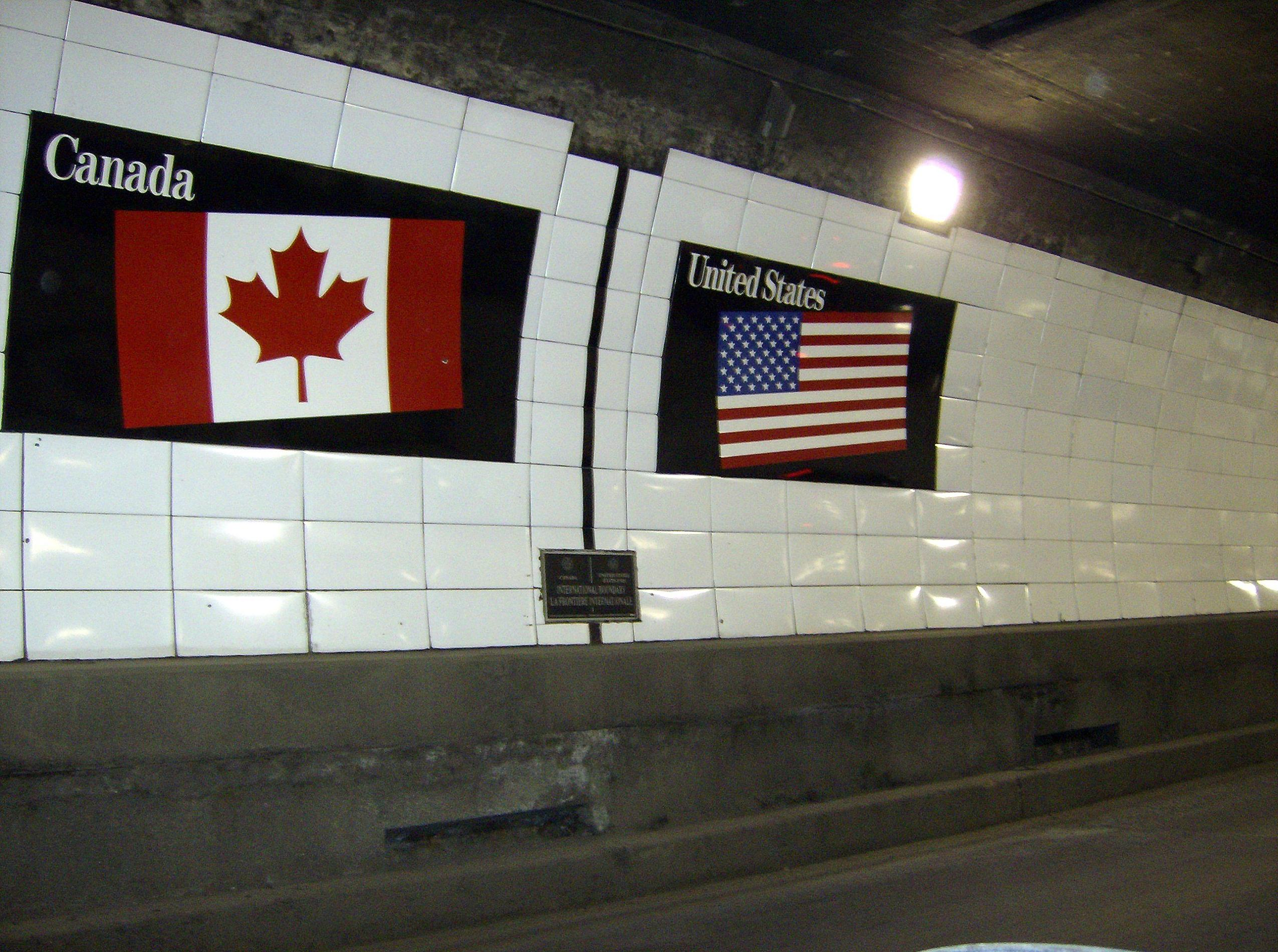
The point of international crossing is marked.

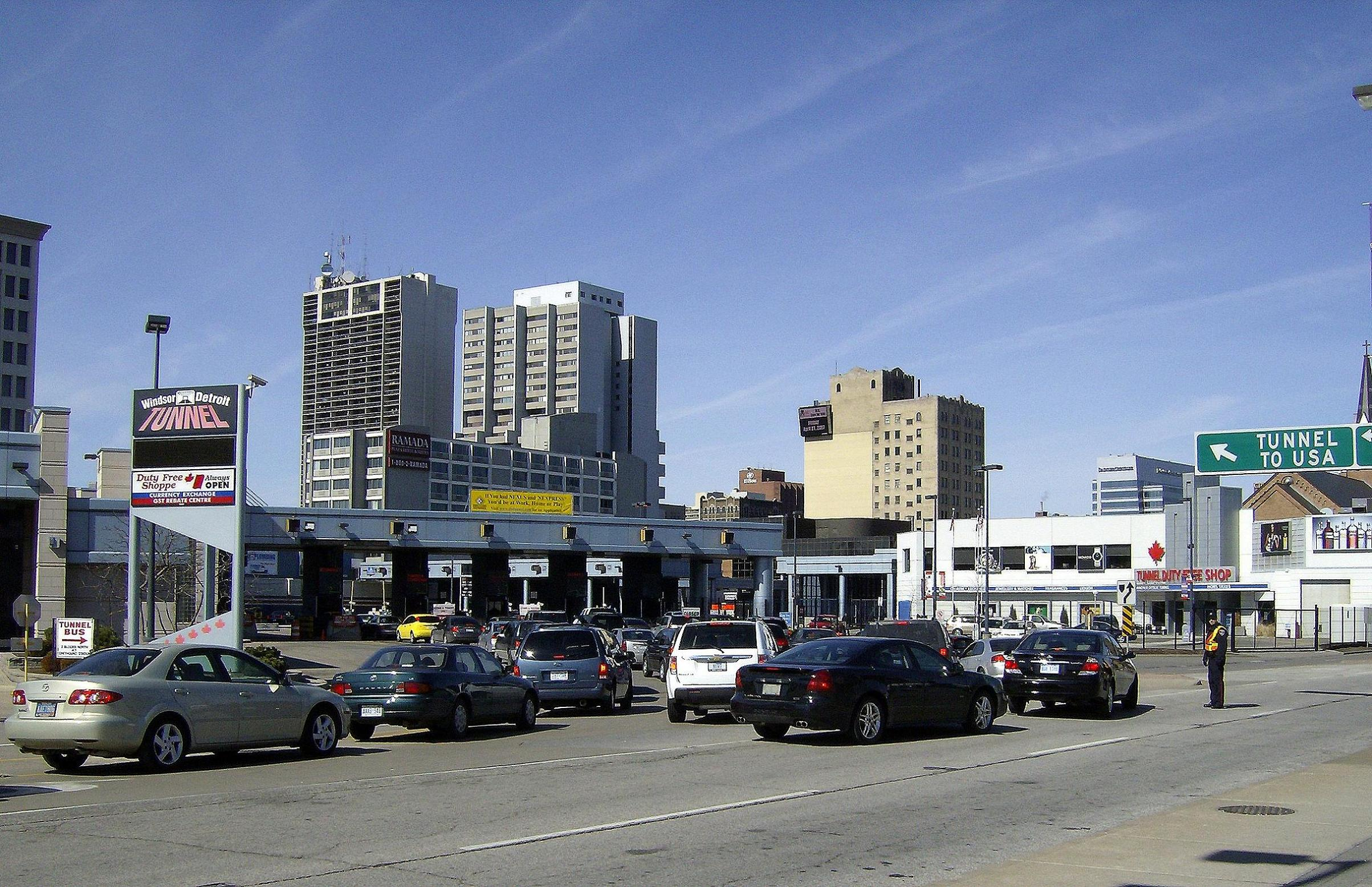
Entering from the Canadian side at Goyeau Street

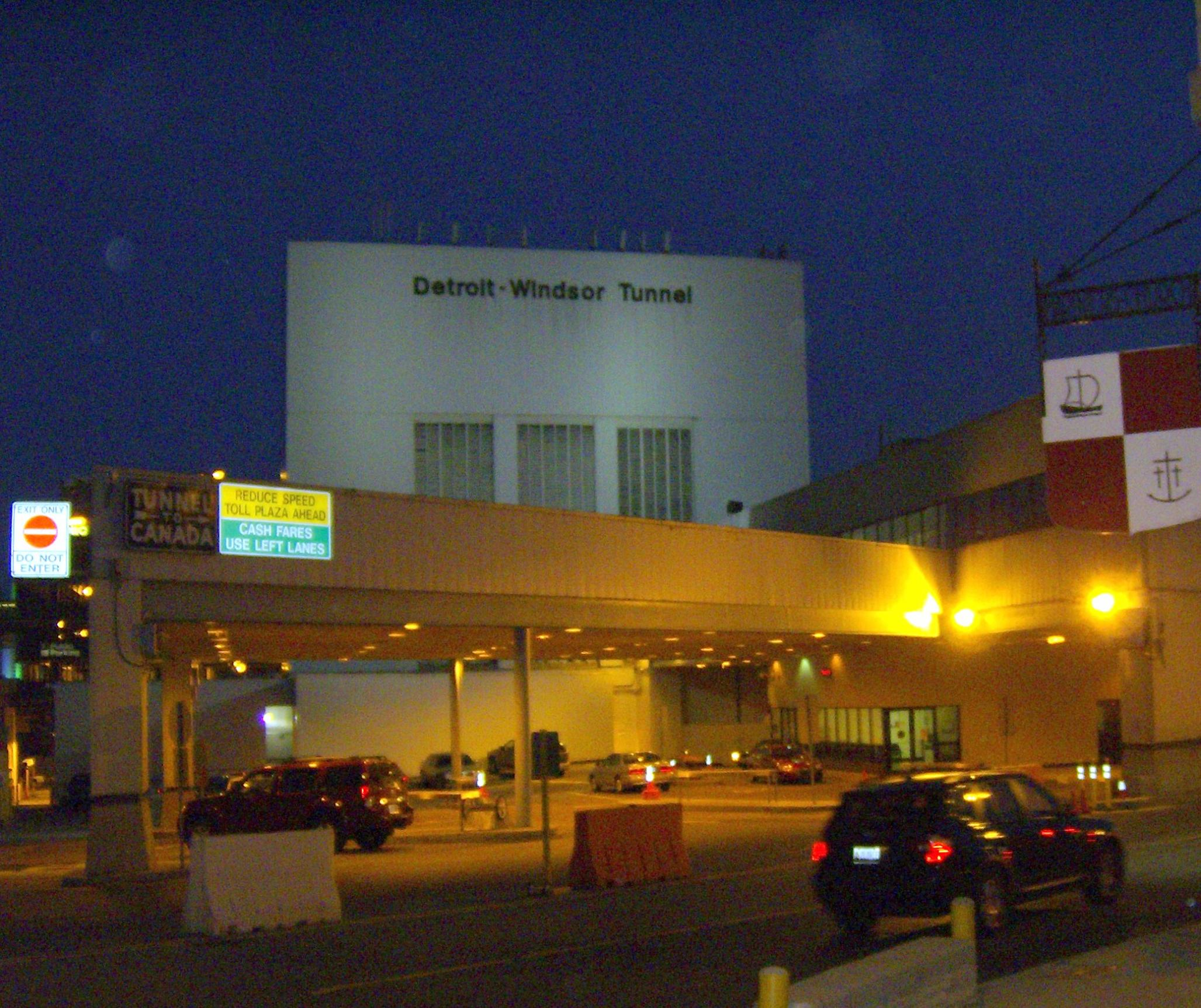
Entering from the US side at Jefferson Ave

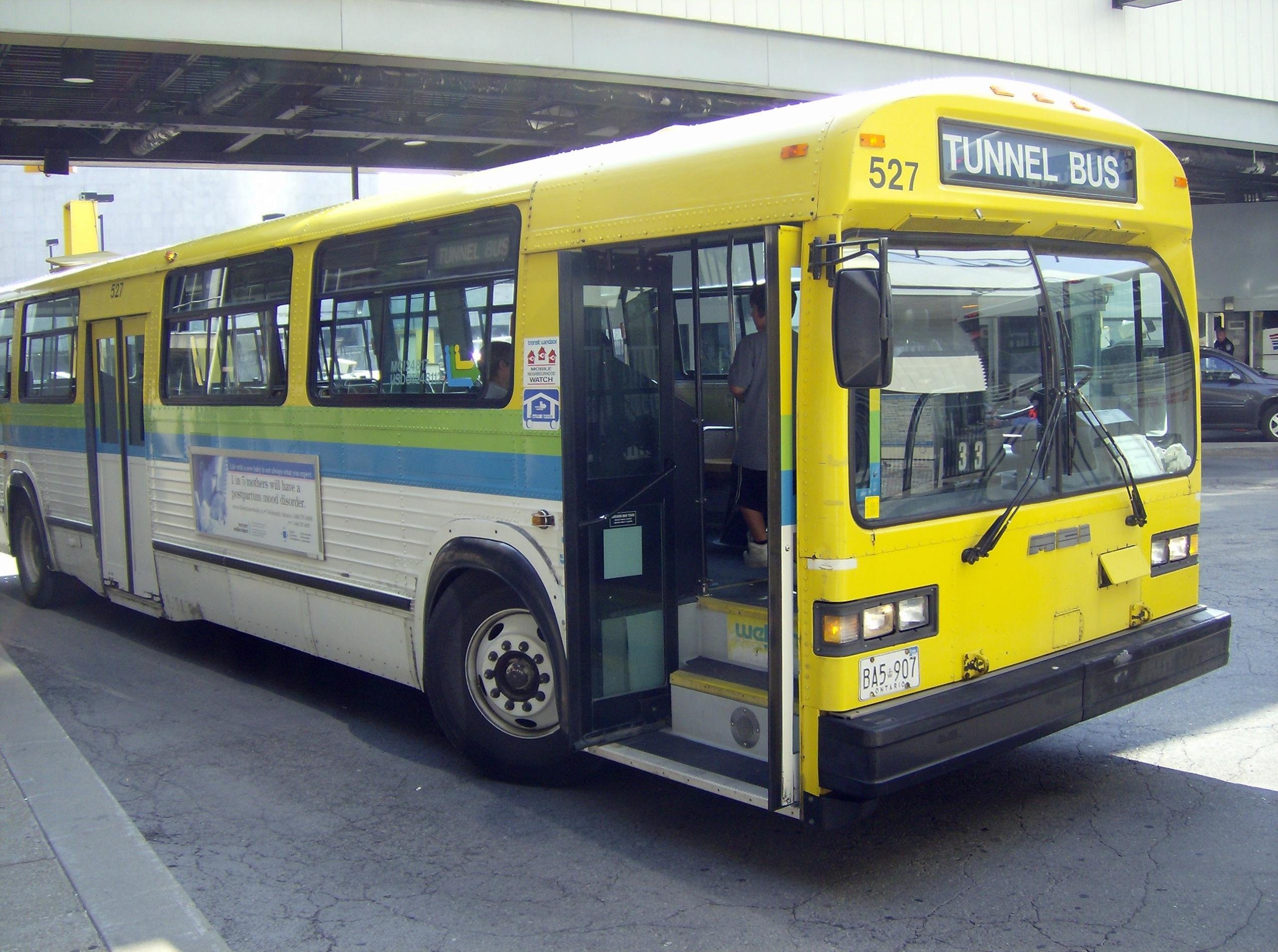
Transit Windsor's "tunnel bus" was a municipally operated bus that regularly crossed the border until it was cancelled in 2025; it waits in Detroit as passengers go through U.S. Customs.

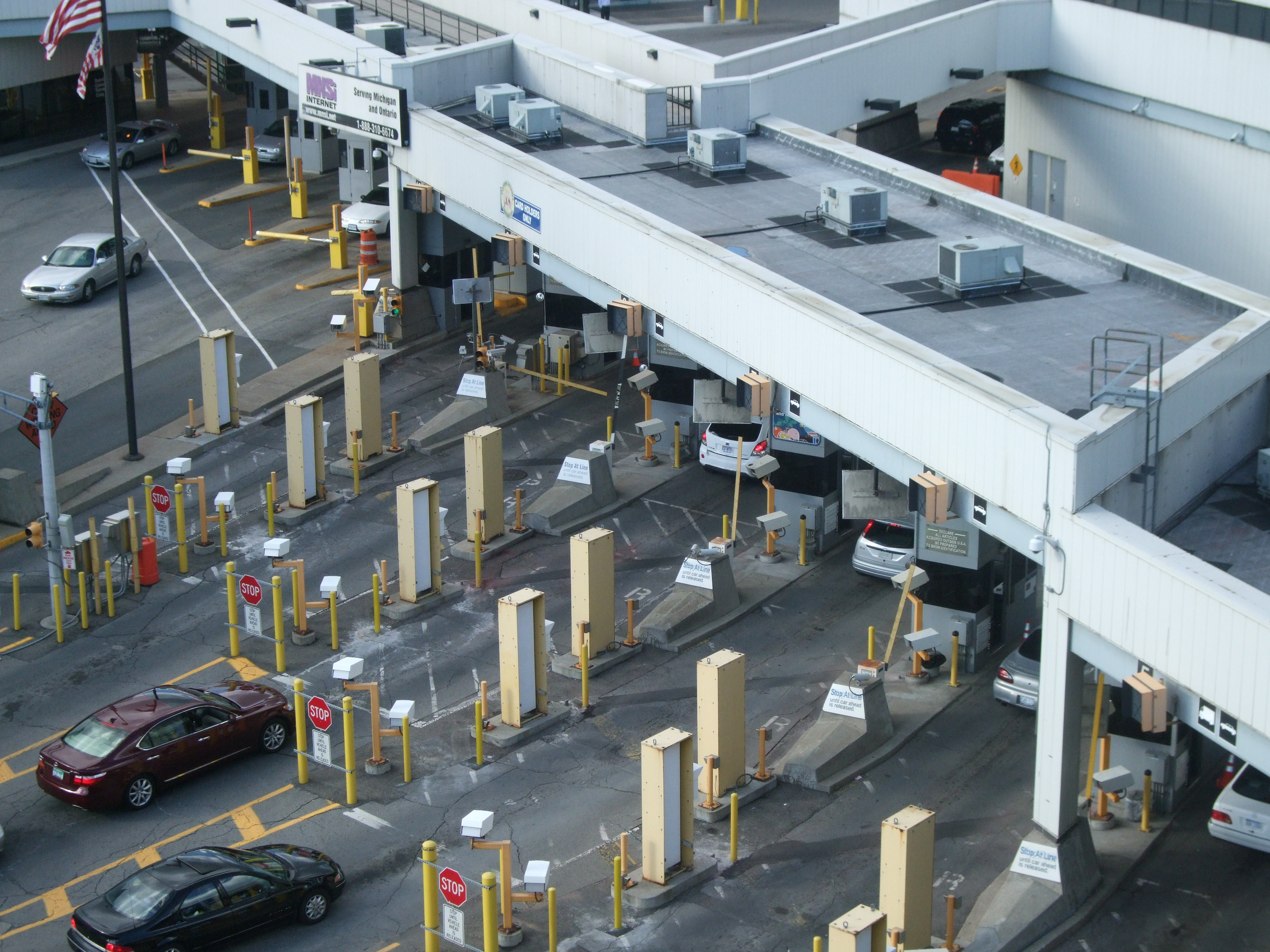
U.S. Customs and Border Protection Checkpoint

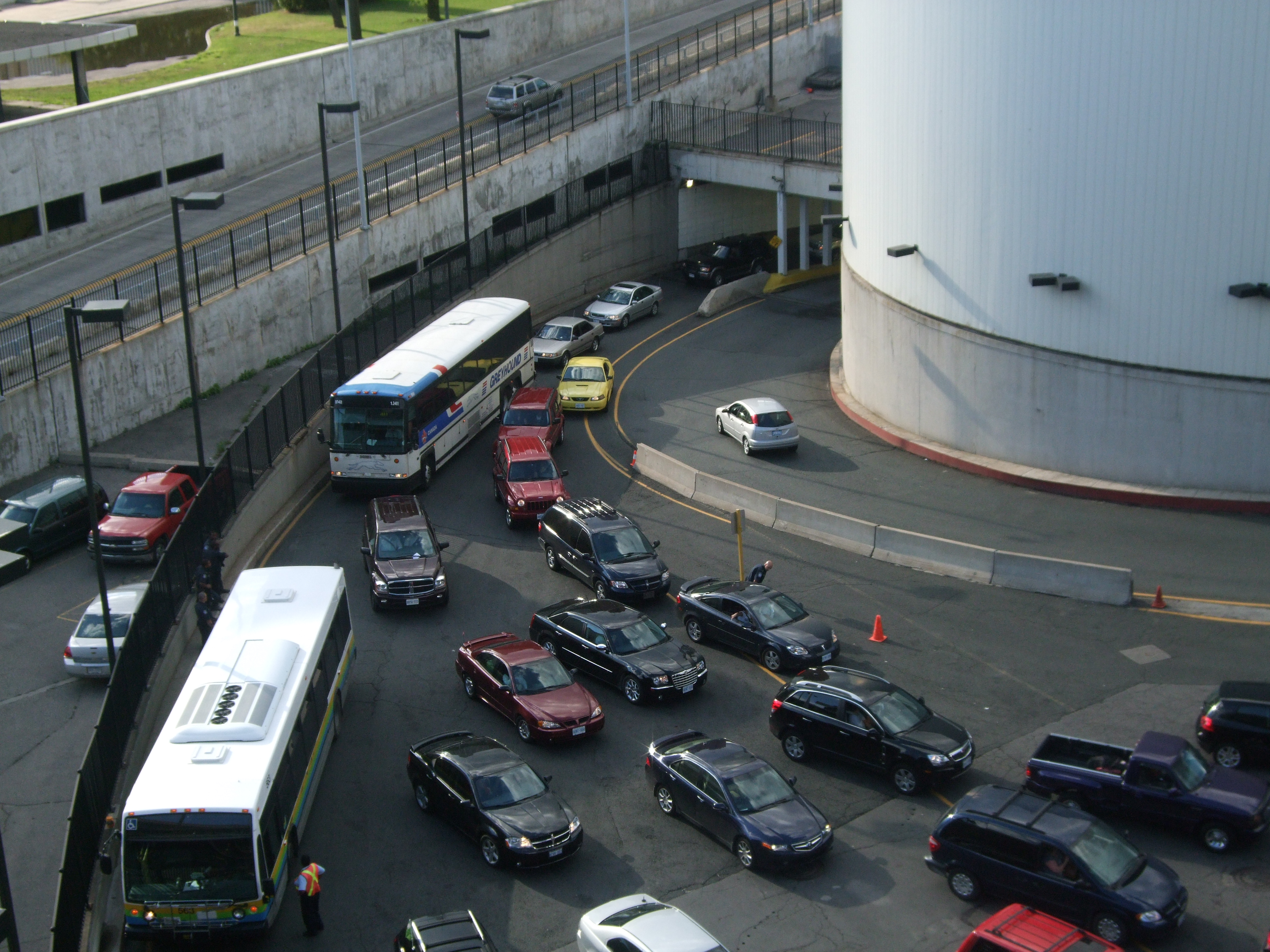
Detroit portal of the tunnel

Video of drive through tunnel from Windsor to Detroit in 2010

== See also ==
- Ambassador Bridge
- Gordie Howe International Bridge
- Detroit International Riverfront
- Transportation in metropolitan Detroit
- Detroit–Windsor
