= Bluesfest =

Bluesfest may refer to:

- Byron Bay Bluesfest, in Australia, also known as East Coast Blues & Roots Music Festival
- Bluesfest International Windsor, in Windsor, Ontario, Canada
- Ottawa Bluesfest, a blues and rock festival in Ottawa, Ontario, Canada
