= Blues and Roots Festival =

Blues and Roots Festival may refer to:

- Bluesfest International Windsor, a music festival hosted in Windsor, Ontario, Canada
- East Coast Blues & Roots Music Festival, a music festival hosted at Byron Bay, New South Wales, Australia
- Salmon Arm Roots and Blues Festival, a music festival hosted at Salmon Arm Fair Grounds on the Shuswap Lake in British Columbia
- West Coast Blues & Roots Festival, a music festival held in Fremantle, Western Australia
