= Brian Bulcke =

Canadian gridiron football player (born 1987)

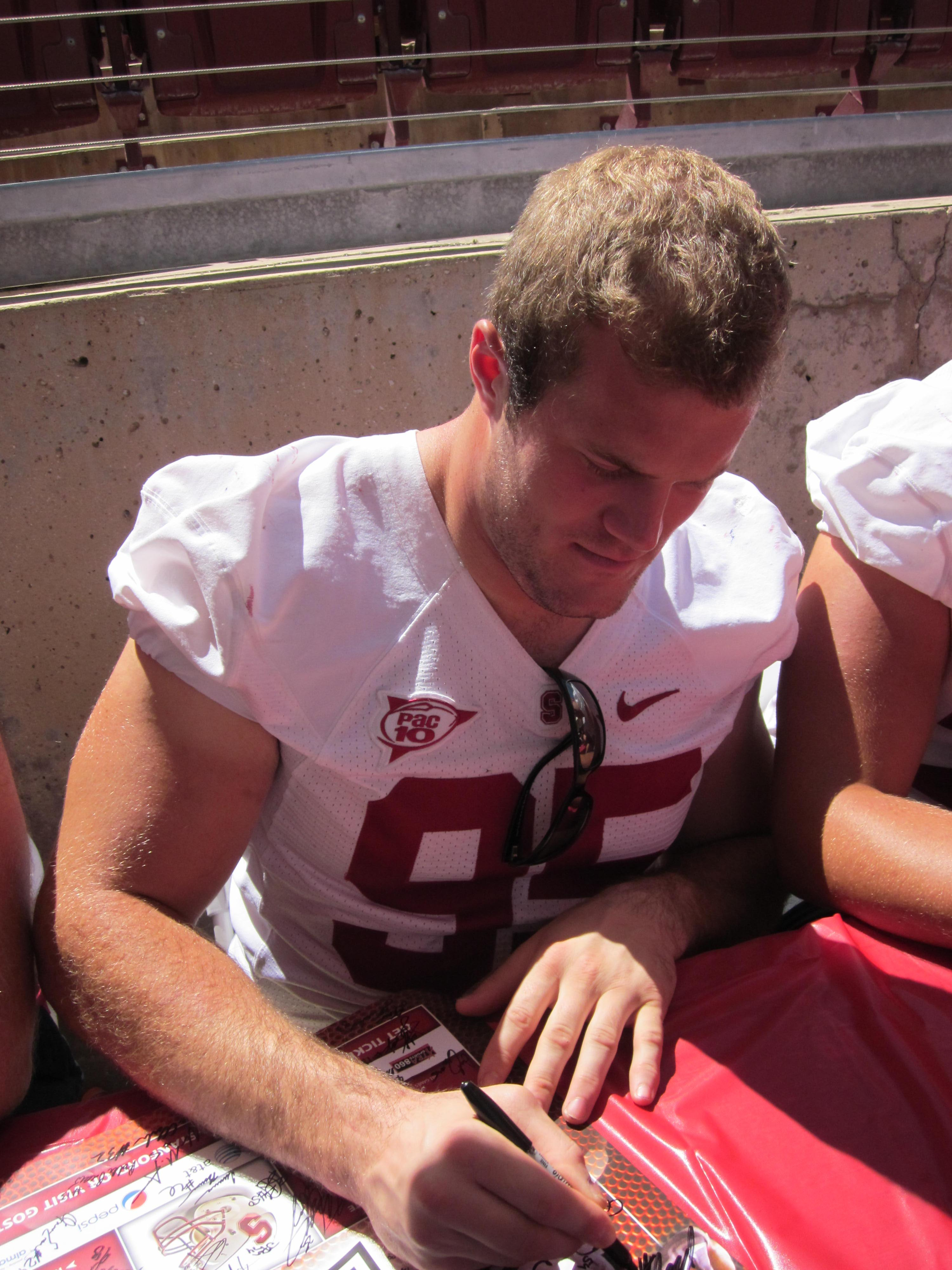
- Bulcke at Stanford in August 2010

No. 94
- Position: Defensive lineman

Personal information
- Born: April 27, 1987 (age 39); Windsor, Ontario, Canada
- Listed height: 6 ft 4 in (1.93 m)
- Listed weight: 285 lb (129 kg)

Career information
- College: Stanford
- CFL draft: 2010: 1st round, 6th overall pick

Career history
- 2010: Edmonton Eskimos*
- 2011: San Francisco 49ers*
- 2011–2012: Calgary Stampeders
- 2013–2015: Hamilton Tiger-Cats
- 2016: Toronto Argonauts
- * Offseason or practice squad member only

Awards and highlights
- 2014 Team Captain; 2013 CFL Most Outstanding Defensive Player Nominee; 2013 CFL Most Outstanding Canadian Player Nominee
- Stats at Pro Football Reference
- Stats at CFL.ca

Brian Bulcke (born April 27, 1987) is a Canadian former professional football defensive lineman who played in the Canadian Football League (CFL). He was drafted sixth overall by the Edmonton Eskimos in the 2010 CFL draft and, after having his rights traded, signed with the Calgary Stampeders on September 11, 2011 after finishing his college eligibility and trying out for the NFL's San Francisco 49ers. He signed with the Hamilton Tiger-Cats on February 15, 2013.

Bulcke played college football for the Stanford Cardinal.

== Early life ==
Regarded as one of the top three prospects in Canada, Bulcke played defensive and offensive line for Ecole Secondaire L'Essor and Saint Anne Catholic High School in Tecumseh, Ontario. He was a 4-year starter on both sides of the ball and served as team captain as a senior. Bulcke was named All-Ontario offensive guard by Weir's Magazine as well as the conference defensive MVP as a senior after finishing the year with 54 tackles and 7 sacks. Bulcke was the youngest defensive starter on Team Ontario's 2004 Canada Cup team. He also played four years with the Essex Ravens of the Ontario Varsity Football League where he accounted for 57 tackles and a league-leading 9.5 sacks while being named the province's defensive lineman of the year.

== College career ==
As a true freshman, Bulcke began his career at Stanford as a middle linebacker and registered a career-high 14 tackles vs. the Navy Midshipmen which represented the second-highest total recorded by a Cardinal defender on the season. After switching to defensive line for the remainder of his time at Stanford, he concluded his career with 60 tackles and five quarterback sacks.

Bulcke graduated in 2011 from Stanford with a Master of Science in Management Science & Engineering and a Bachelor's degree in Mechanical Engineering.

== Professional career ==
Bulcke was drafted sixth overall in the 2010 CFL draft, but remained in college to play out his college eligibility. Meanwhile, his rights were traded to the Calgary Stampeders in 2011, where he played for parts of two seasons. Bulcke signed with Hamilton Tiger-Cats in 2013 where he helped lead the team to an appearance in the 101st Grey Cup. He played in eight games with the Tiger-Cats in the 2014 season before sustaining a season-ending injury in a game against the Saskatchewan Roughriders.

On February 11, 2016, Bulcke signed with the Toronto Argonauts as a free agent. He was released by the Argos on August 18, 2016, after playing in one game for the club.
