= École secondaire l'Essor =

École Secondaire Catholique l'Essor
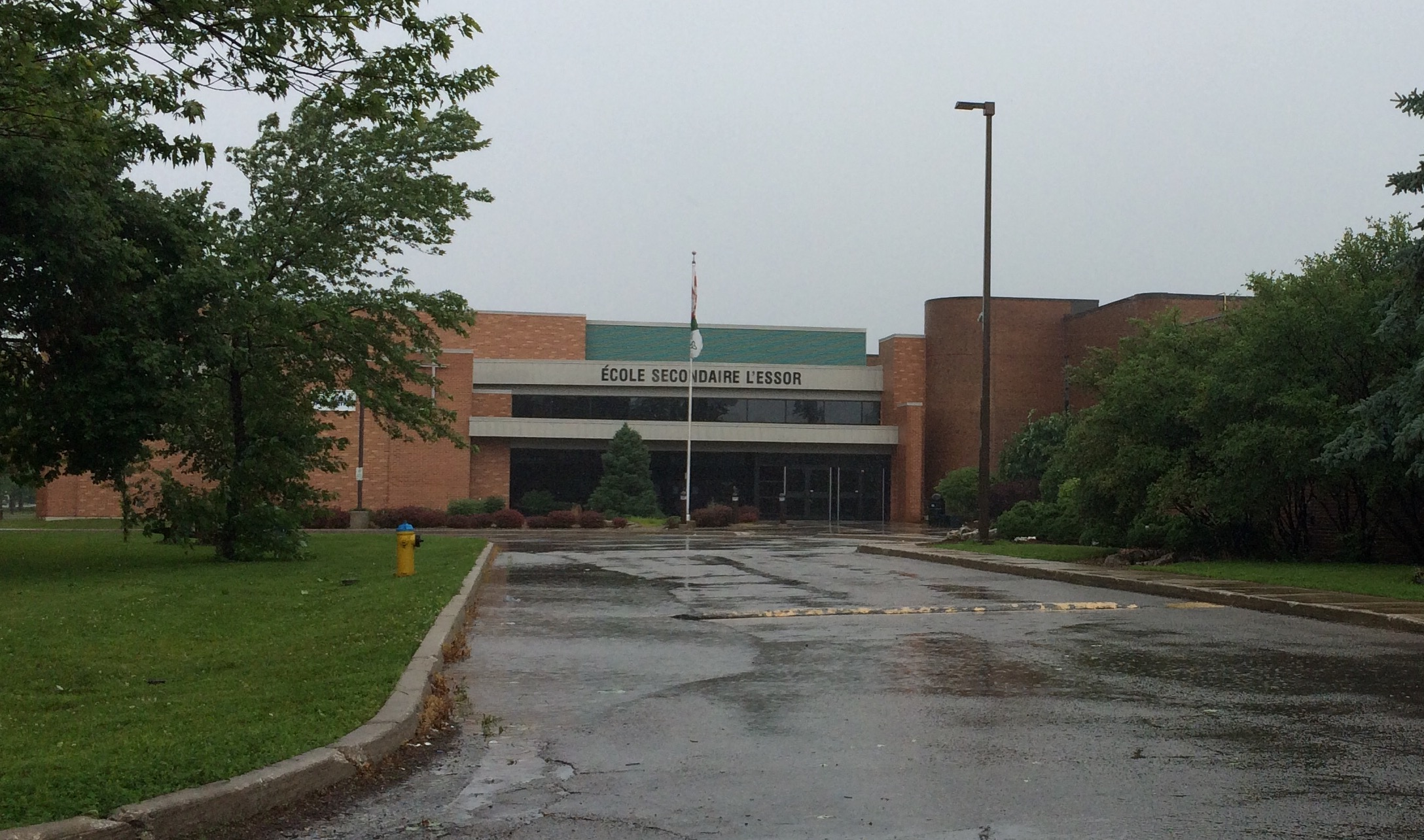

Location
- 13605 St. Gregory Road; Tecumseh, Ontario, N8N 3E4; Canada; 42°18′52″N 82°51′46″W

Information
- School type: Publicly funded, Separate High school
- Motto: French: l'Aigle seul à le droit de fixer le soleil ("Only the eagle has the right to reach for great heights")
- Religious affiliation: Catholic
- Founded: 1979
- School board: Conseil scolaire catholique Providence
- School number: 728772
- Principal: Tanya Basic
- Grades: 7–12
- Enrollment: 648 (August 2017)
- Language: French
- Colours: Orange, Brown, White (1979–1995) Orange, Black, White (1995 – present)
- Mascot: Eagle
- Website: cscprovidence.ca/lEssor
- Last updated: 19 November 2017

École secondaire catholique l'Essor is a publicly funded separate (Catholic), French-language high school located in Tecumseh, Ontario, Canada (formerly St. Clair Beach), established in 1979. It serves the Francophone population of Essex County. The name l'Essor, coined by local resident Florence Limoges, is a portmanteau combining "Essex" and "Windsor". Essor also refers to the French word "to take flight". The school belongs to the Conseil scolaire catholique Providence.

The small school participates in a wide variety of local activities in the Francophone community. A notable example is the Franco Bowl, an annual football match against neighboring Windsor's French Catholic high-school, École secondaire E.J. Lajeunesse. The school has a very high percentage of graduates and high test scores.

== Notable alumni ==
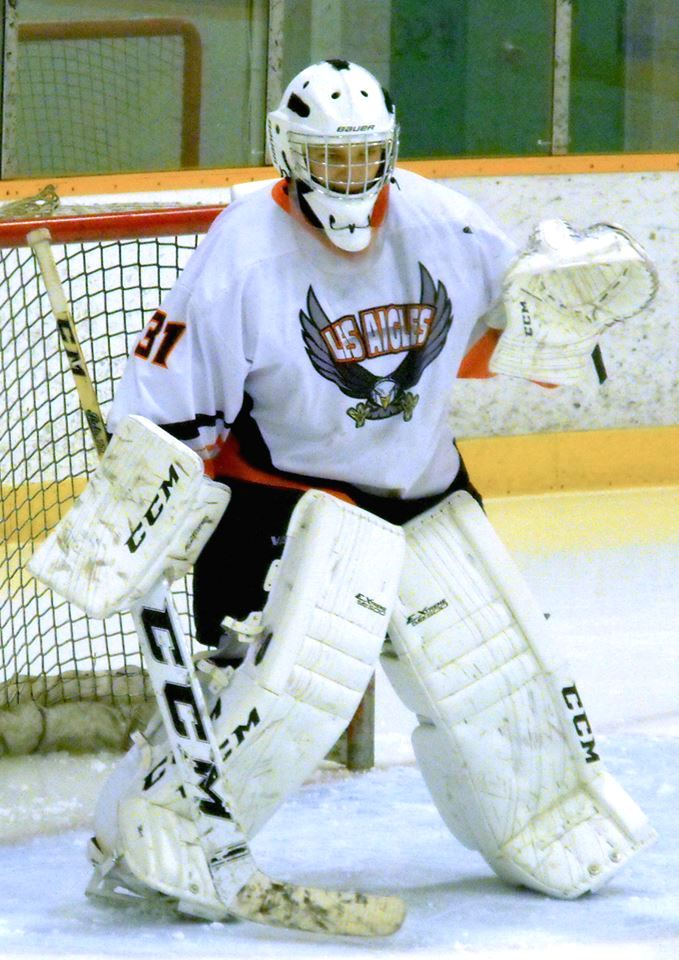
Aigles goalie during 2014–15 season.

- Brian Bulcke, football player, played in the CFL with Hamilton Tiger-Cats and Toronto Argonauts
- Andrew Dowie, former town councilor for Tecumseh and current MPP for Windsor-Tecumseh
- Taras Natyshak, MPP for Essex
- David Tremblay, 5 time CIS National Champion, 2014 Commonwealth Gold, 2012 Olympian – Wrestling
- Paul Vallée, technology entrepreneur and CIGI Senior Fellow
- Kyle Wellwood, retired NHL hockey player

== Sports ==
Sports include: Football, Hockey, Basketball, Soccer, Volleyball, Wrestling, Golf, Tennis, Badminton, Swimming, Softball, Baseball, Cross Country, Track and Field

== See also ==
- Education in Ontario
- List of high schools in Windsor and Essex County, Ontario
- List of secondary schools in Ontario
