= Riverfront Festival Plaza =

Park in Windsor, Ontario, Canada

Coordinates: 42.32141°N 83.03426°W

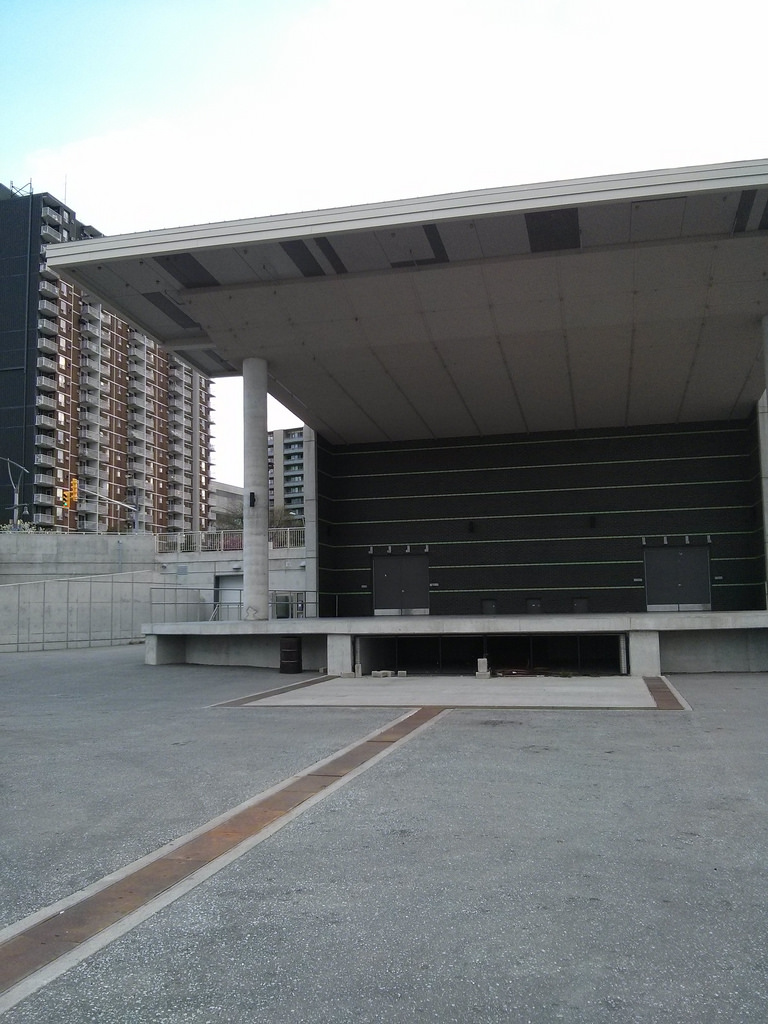
- Interactive map of Riverfront Festival Plaza
- Type: Public park
- Location: Windsor, Ontario
- Operator: City of Windsor

Riverfront Festival Plaza is a park located in downtown Windsor, Ontario, in Canada. It is located along the banks of the Detroit River, between the river and Casino Windsor.

It has over 100,000 square feet (9,300 m^{2}) of festival space. It has hosted many events including Festival Epicure, Bluesfest International Windsor, Beaverfest, Windsor Pride and Windsor Ribfest.

In 2011, the city began renovations to feature a $3.6 million stage complex festival size facilities and improved grounds.
