= Flag of Windsor, Ontario =

Canadian municipal flag

Windsor
- Adopted: 1971

The flag of Windsor, Ontario, was designed by Hector Lacasse, former mayor of adjacent Tecumseh, during a local contest in 1971. The blue and white represent the Detroit River and Saint Lawrence Seaway, respectively. The flag contains the seal of the city in the upper left and a rose in the lower right, highlighting Windsor's alternate motto, "The Rose City"/"City of Roses." The city seal was replaced in 1992 by a corporate seal. The date of 1854 on the seal signifies the final date in which the railroad to Windsor was completely built and the city was formed by the amalgamation of several other settlements. It is also the date that it was founded as a town.

== 1992 Proposal ==
On 8 May 1992, the Canadian Heraldic Authority formally granted to Windsor a new badge, a new crest, and a new flag: Azure on a Canadian pale Argent the shield of Arms of the City of Windsor: Or on a pale between two roses Gules barbed Vert charged with a cogwheel Or a fleur de lys Or above a rose Or barbed Vert charged with a cogwheel Gules a chief undy Azure. It appears that, after the Letters patent had been issued, the City of Windsor does not use the new flag officially, may or may not selectively be using the badge, but certainly utilizes the crest from the 1992 heraldic set.
