= École secondaire E.J. Lajeunesse =

French-Catholic high school in Windsor, Ontario, Canada

Coordinates: 42.276968°N 83.020039°W

- Windsor, Ontario; Canada

Information
- Religious affiliation: Catholicism
- Established: 1993; 33 years ago
- Language: French
- Website: esejlajeunesse.cscprovidence.ca

E J Lajeunesse is a French-Catholic high school in Windsor, Ontario, Canada. It belongs to the Conseil scolaire catholique Providence and is named after Father Ernest Joseph Lajeunesse.

== History ==
After an agreement with the University of Windsor Faculty of Education, the school bought the faculty's facilities and converted into a high school in 1993. In 1998, with the creation of the French school board CSDECSO, it became one of two French secondary schools in Essex County, along with Ecole secondaire l'Essor.

== Programs ==
=== Specialist High Skills Majors ===
The school offers five Specialist High Skills Majors programs. The Hospitality and Tourism program is taught by M. Dénommé. This has led to the construction of a top-of-the-line food preparation classroom. The second SHSM program is in Construction. This program is taught by M. D. Labbé. The wood shop boasts advanced machinery. In September 2012 the SHSM will also be offered in Business studies. The SHSM program allows students to specialize in these areas and receive additional certifications. The fourth is business and the fifth is transport.

=== Dramatic Arts ===
École secondaire EJ Lajeunesse's dramatic arts program includes a yearly school production and a senior class play. The drama program participates in both the Sears Drama Festival and Théâtre Action, and also has a competitive Improv team which competes regionally and in the province. The school has a large auditorium due to the building's previous use by the University of Windsor.

=== Music ===
The school offers music classes at all levels. No musical background is needed to take AMU1O. The school also offers Jazz band as an after school program. Concerts take place at the end of each semester. The Music students also perform for grade 1 students at Christmas.

=== Sports ===
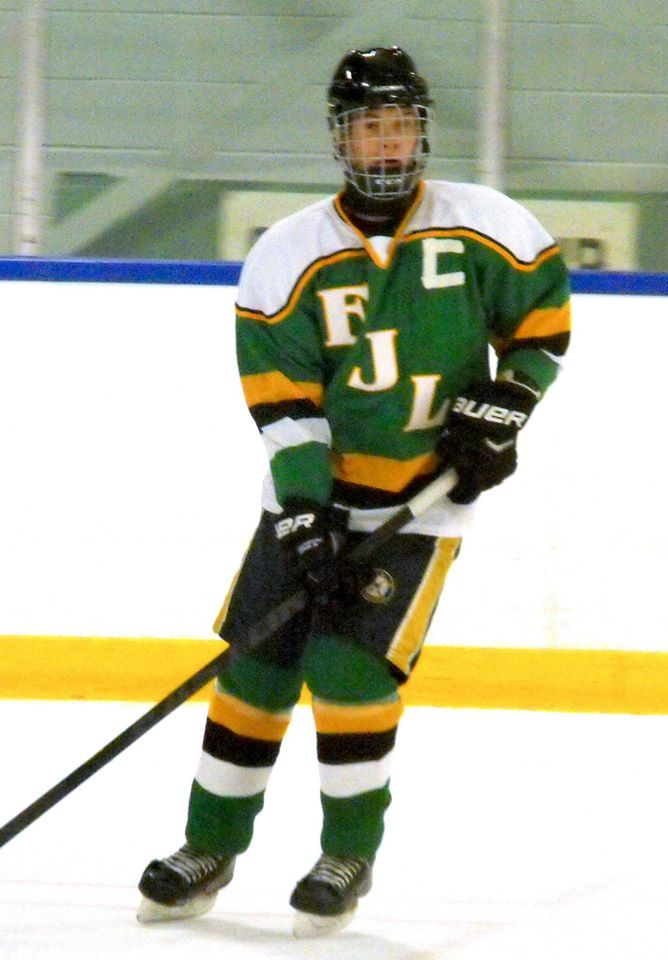
Royals player during 2014–15 season.

The school competes in a number of team sports including volleyball, basketball, hockey, wrestling, swimming, soccer and football. In March, 2009 the girls volleyball competed in OFSAA, and the girls basketball team has also won FRANCO in 2010 and in 2018. The school also has a hockey program that is offered to grades 7 to 12. March 6–8, 2017 LaJeunesse hosted OFSAA boys basketball for schools in the Windsor area, they took antique bronze.

=== Conseil des élèves ===
E.J. Lajeunesse has a student council program that helps serve and engage students in learning about democracy and leadership. The council also plans and hosts many activities during the year. The committee is built of about 15 members ranging from grades 7/8 to 12 and has weekly meetings. Elections are held at the end of every school year for the following year.

== See also ==
- Education in Ontario
- List of secondary schools in Ontario
