= Sirved =

- Company type: Corporation
- Industry: Internet; Computer software; Advertising
- Founded: 2015; 11 years ago
- Founders: Jonathan Leslie; Kyle Brown
- Headquarters: Windsor, Ontario, Canada
- Area served: North America
- Key people: Jonathan Leslie (President); Kyle Brown (Vice President); Derek Watts (CTO)
- Website: sirved.com

Sirved Mobile Solutions Inc. is a Canadian technology company founded in 2015 in Windsor, Ontario. It uses various technologies to collect and index restaurant menus and information.

== History ==
Sirved was founded in 2015 by Jonathan Leslie and Kyle Brown. The company was originally designed to be an online food ordering service, similar to Just Eat and GrubHub. However, in 2018 the company re-focused its efforts into making itself a "restaurant discovery platform" expanding on their searching and discovery features.

== Growth and Expansion ==
After their initial launch in 2015, Sirved began building a database of restaurant menus - starting in Windsor, Ontario. They expanded into more regions, eventually including menus from the rest of Canada and the United States. Their menu database now hosts menus for over 400,000 restaurants.

During their expansion into the US market, Sirved was featured in the Start-Up Alley at the 2018 National Restaurant Association show at McCormick Place in Chicago.

In 2022, Sirved acquired popular platform AllergyEats, where users review restaurants on how friendly they are for allergies. Paul Antico stated he sold the site so he "could focus on my return to my love of investing in the equity markets". The official announcement claimed AllergyEats would continue operating independently.

== Technology ==
Sirved uses various technologies to analyze restaurant menus. Through this process they use artificial intelligence algorithms and other techniques to index restaurant menus, allowing users to find specific food items on particular menus through a menu-driven search engine.

== Rebranding ==
When Sirved first launched, the branding consisted of a red logo featuring a crossed fork and knife.

In 2019 the company decided to rebrand following the 2018 pivot from online ordering to "restaurant discovery". Sirved rebranded with a new logo featuring a multi-tool with a fork and spoon, and switched their company colour to purple. This rebranding came alongside a redesigned version of their website, IOS and Android mobile apps.

== Community Outreach ==
Sirved has partnered with the Canadian Mental Health Association as part of the Sole Focus Project. As part of the partnership, users of the service could purchase fan event tickets to a Detroit Tigers baseball game, which included a donation to the Canadian Mental Health Association and the Sole Focus Project.

Sirved has partnered with Windsors Carrousel of Nations event, acting as a companion app for the event. The app was used to showcase the menus for each of the food villages and the events that took place. This allowed each of the event locations to have their location and menu made accessible on the internet.
