= Windsor-Essex Pride =

Annual LGBT event in Windsor, Ontario, Canada

Windsor-Essex Pride Fest (WEPF) is a registered not-for-profit organization in the Province of Ontario governed by a volunteer Board of Directors.

Annually in August, Windsor-Essex Pride Fest hosts a large outdoor festival called Pride Fest that features entertainment, activities, vendors, speakers, and more. Every year, Pride Fest is attended by nearly 7,500 people, making it one of the largest multi-day events in the region.

The event was first held in 1992. Most festival events take place at the downtown Riverfront Festival Plaza, with the concluding parade taking place on Ouellette Avenue between Elliott Street and Riverside Drive.

Windsor-Essex Pride Fest also organizes other LGBT community events throughout the year, as well as participating in tourism marketing projects including the publication of an LGBT tourism guide to Windsor and Essex County in 2012. The organization received a $210,000 grant from the Ontario Trillium Foundation in 2012 to expand its programming.
