= Bluesfest International Windsor =

Music festival in Windsor, Ontario, Canada

- Genre: Blues
- Dates: Second weekend of July
- Locations: Windsor, Ontario, Canada
- Years active: 1995–Present

Bluesfest International is a three-day blues and roots music festival held annually in Windsor, Ontario, Canada, at the Riverfront Festival Plaza on the banks of the Detroit River, in front of Caesars Windsor and opposite Motown.

The festival has grown in size and grandeur since its initial appearance in 1995, and in 2008 it attracted an estimated audience of 30,000 people throughout the weekend. Ted Boomer is the creator and senior producer of Bluesfest International.

Ted, his wife Louise Knowles and partners John Liedtke and Sheryl Davies ran the festival until 2013. Notable leading artists that have attended Bluesfest include: Edgar and Johnny Winter, Robin Trower, Gregg Rolie, Buddy Guy, Tim Robbins, David Clayton-Thomas, the Yardbirds, Robert Cray, Cactus, Mitch Ryder, Dick Wagner, Ten Years After, Gordon Downie, Southside Johnny, Tab Benoit, the Funk Brothers, Los Lonely Boys, Steve Earle, Murray McLauchlan, The Fabulous Thunderbirds, Jeff Healey, Richie Havens, Leon Russell, Levon Helm, Dickey Betts, Sonny Rhodes, Colin James, Molly Hatchet, Ana Popović, and Taj Mahal. The festival relies on corporate, labour, and community sponsorship and includes a number of non-profit and charitable beneficiaries each year.

In 2013, the London event was canceled due to the resignation of Chris Gould, the then-president of Bluesfest London, but it has since resumed.
