= Windsor, Ontario =

City in Ontario, Canada

Windsor
- City (single-tier)
- City of Windsor
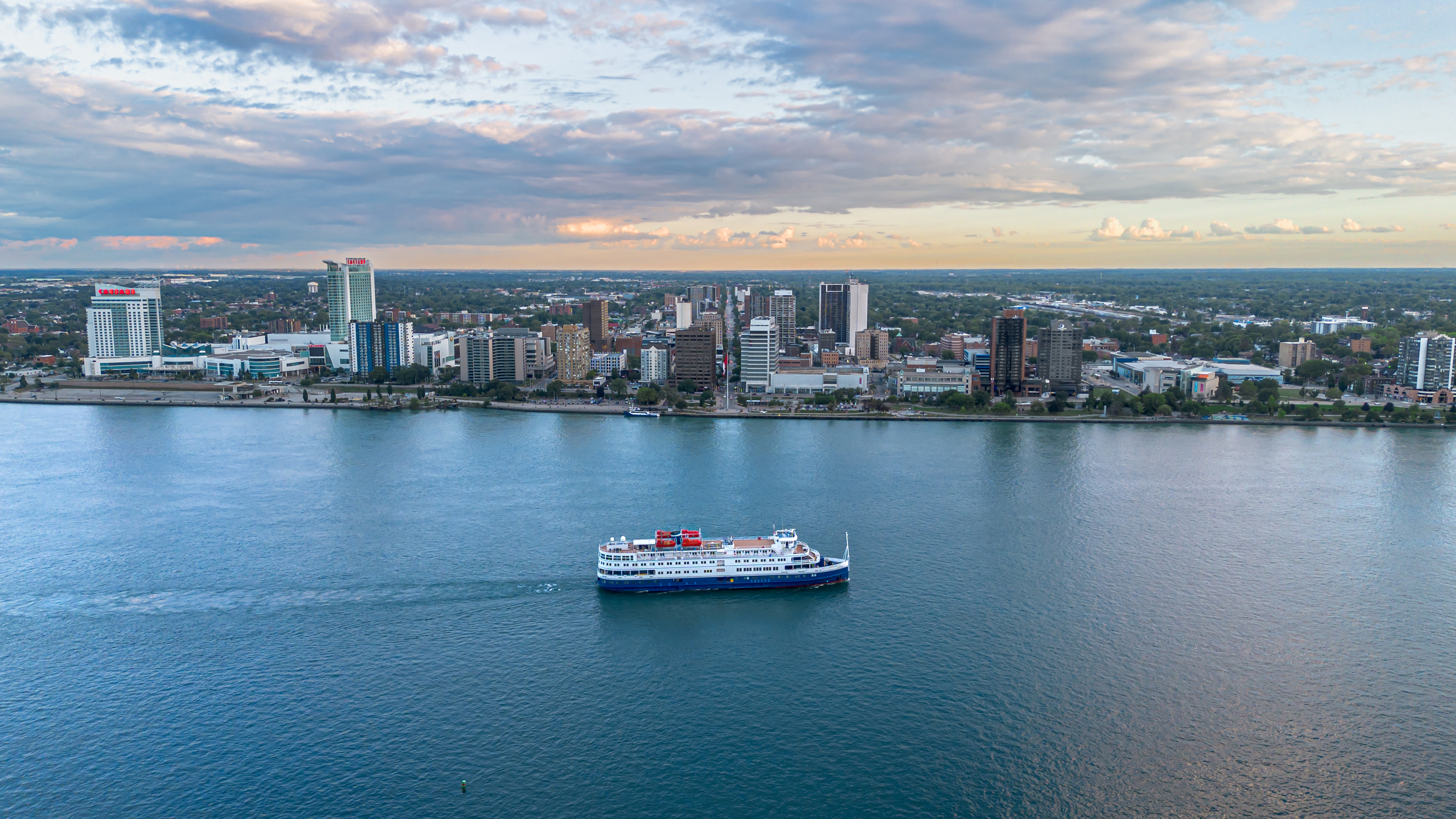
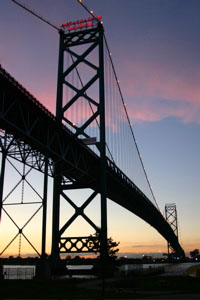
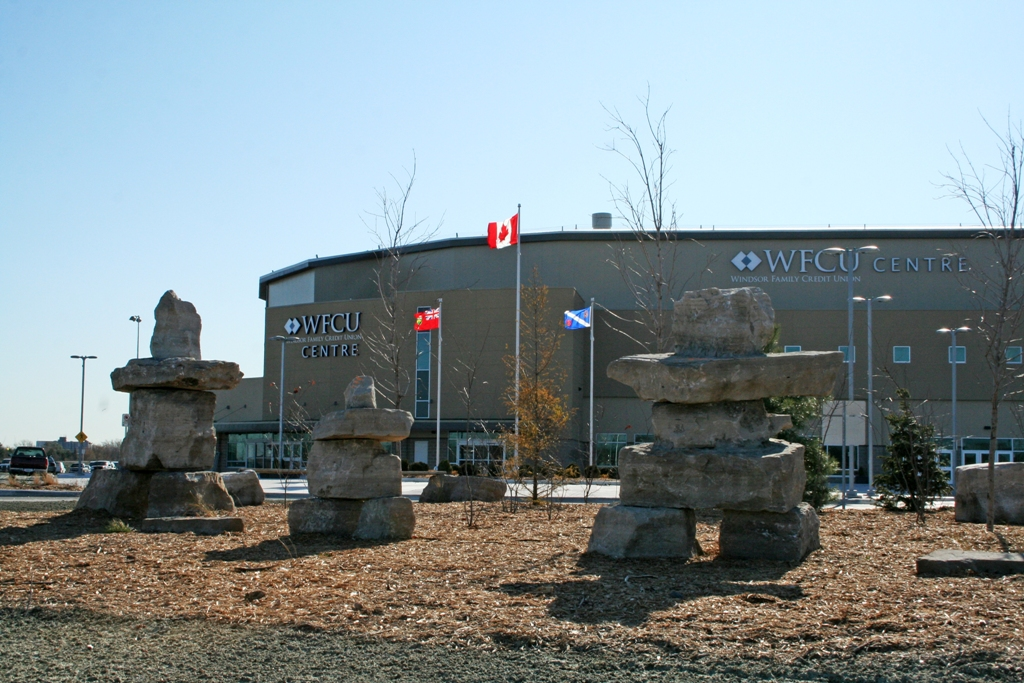
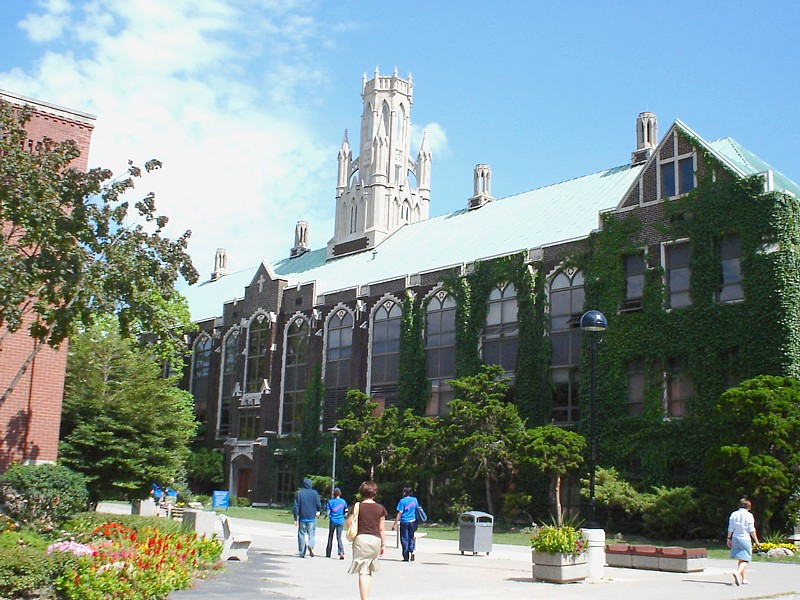
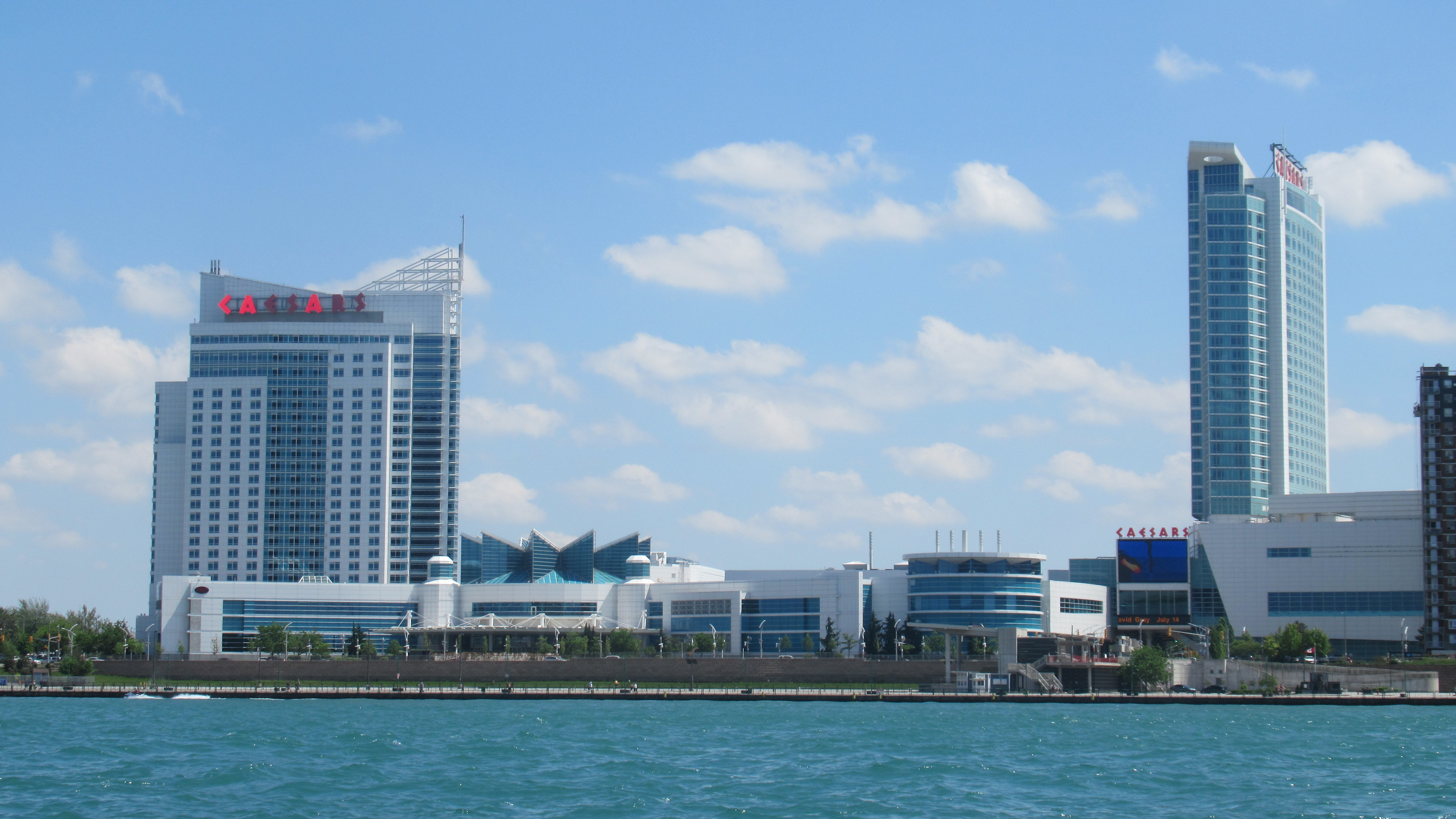
- From top, left to right: Downtown Windsor skyline, Ambassador Bridge, WFCU Centre, Dillon Hall at University of Windsor, and Caesars Windsor

- Flag Coat of arms Logo
- Nicknames: "The City of Roses", "Automotive Capital of Canada"
- Motto: The river and the land sustain us. - "The Place to Be."
- Location in the Detroit–Windsor region

- Location within southern Ontario Location within Ontario Location within Canada
- Coordinates: 42°18′51″N 83°2′12″W
- Country: Canada
- Province: Ontario
- Census division: Essex
- Settled: 1749
- Incorporated: 1854
- Named for: Windsor, Berkshire, England

Government
  - Type: Council-Manager
  - Mayor: Fred Francis
  - Governing body: Windsor City Council
  - MPs: Harb Gill (CPC), Kathy Borrelli (CPC)
  - MPPs: Lisa Gretzky (NDP), Andrew Dowie (PC)

Area
  - City (single-tier): 146.32 km^{2} (56.49 sq mi)
  - Urban: 175.77 km^{2} (67.87 sq mi)
  - Metro: 1,022.84 km^{2} (394.92 sq mi)
- Elevation: 190 m (620 ft)

Population (2022)
  - City (single-tier): 236,789 (23rd)
  - Density: 1,618.3/km^{2} (4,191.4/sq mi)
  - Urban: 306,519 (16th)
  - Metro: 422,630 (16th)
- Demonym: Windsorite

Gross Metropolitan Product
  - Windsor CMA: CA$16.4 billion (2019)
- Time zone: UTC−05:00 (EST)
  - Summer (DST): UTC−04:00 (EDT)
- Forward sortation area: N8N to N8Y, N9A to N9K
- Area codes: 519, 226 and 548
- Website: www.citywindsor.ca

Windsor (/ˈwɪndzər/ WIND-zər) is a city in southwestern Ontario, Canada. It is situated on the south bank of the Detroit River directly across from the U.S. city of Detroit, Michigan. Geographically located within but administratively independent of Essex County, it is the southernmost major city in Canada and marks the southwestern end of the Quebec City–Windsor Corridor. The city's population was 229,660 at the 2021 census, making it the third-most populated city in Southwestern Ontario, after London and Kitchener. This represents a 5.7 percent increase from Windsor's 2016 population census of 217,188.

The Detroit–Windsor urban area is North America's most populous trans-border conurbation. Linking the Great Lakes Megalopolis, the Ambassador Bridge border crossing is the busiest commercial crossing on the Canada–United States border, carrying about one-quarter of the two countries' trade volume.

Windsor is a major contributor to Canada's automotive industry and is culturally diverse. Known as the "Automotive Capital of Canada", Windsor's industrial and manufacturing heritage is responsible for how the city has developed through the years.

== History ==
=== Early settlement ===
At the time when the first Europeans arrived in the 17th century, the Detroit River region was inhabited by the Huron, Odawa, Potawatomi and Iroquois First Nations. The land along the Detroit River was part of the Three Fires Confederacy between the Ojibwe, Potawatomi, and Odawa and was referred to as Wawiiatanong or Wawiiatanong Ziibi meaning "where the river bends" in Anishinaabemowin.

=== Later settlement ===
A French agricultural settlement was established at the site of Windsor in 1749. It is the oldest continually inhabited European-founded settlement in Canada west of Montreal. The area was first named la Petite Côte ("Little Coast"—as opposed to the longer coastline on the Detroit side of the river). Later it was called La Côte de Misère ("Poverty Coast") because of the sandy soils near LaSalle.

Windsor's French-Canadian heritage is reflected in French street names such as Ouellette, Drouillard, Pelissier, François, Pierre, Langlois, Marentette, and Lauzon. The current street system (a grid with elongated blocks) reflects the Canadien method of agricultural land division, where the farms were long and narrow, fronting along the river. Today, the name of the north–south street often shows the name of the family that farmed the land where the street is today. The street system of outlying areas is consistent with the British system for granting land concessions. There is a sizeable French-speaking minority in Windsor and the surrounding area, particularly in the Lakeshore, Tecumseh and LaSalle areas.

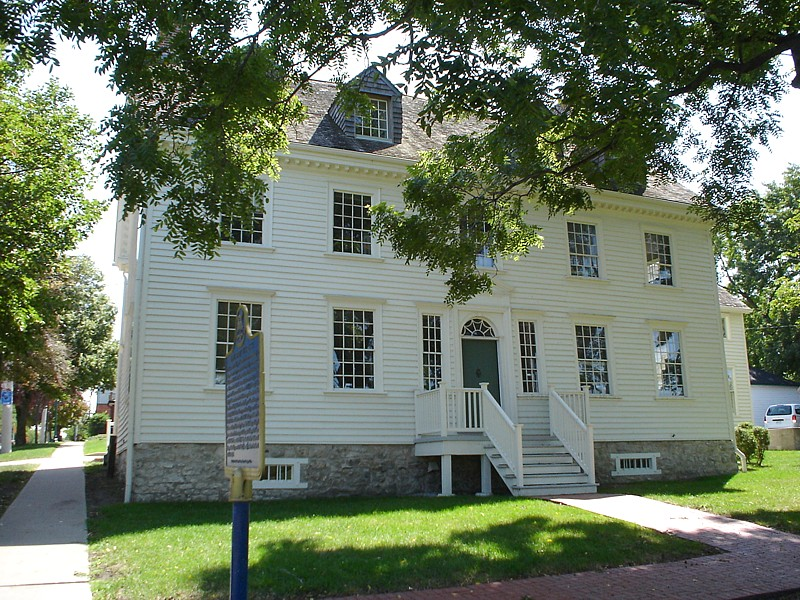
Duff-Baby House

In 1797, after the American Revolution, the settlement of "Sandwich" was established. It was later renamed Windsor, after the town in Berkshire, England. The Sandwich neighbourhood on Windsor's west side is home to some of the city's oldest buildings, including Mackenzie Hall, originally built as the Essex County Courthouse in 1855. Today, this building is a community centre. The city's oldest building is the Duff-Baby House, built in 1792. It is owned by Ontario Heritage Trust and houses government offices.

=== 19th century ===
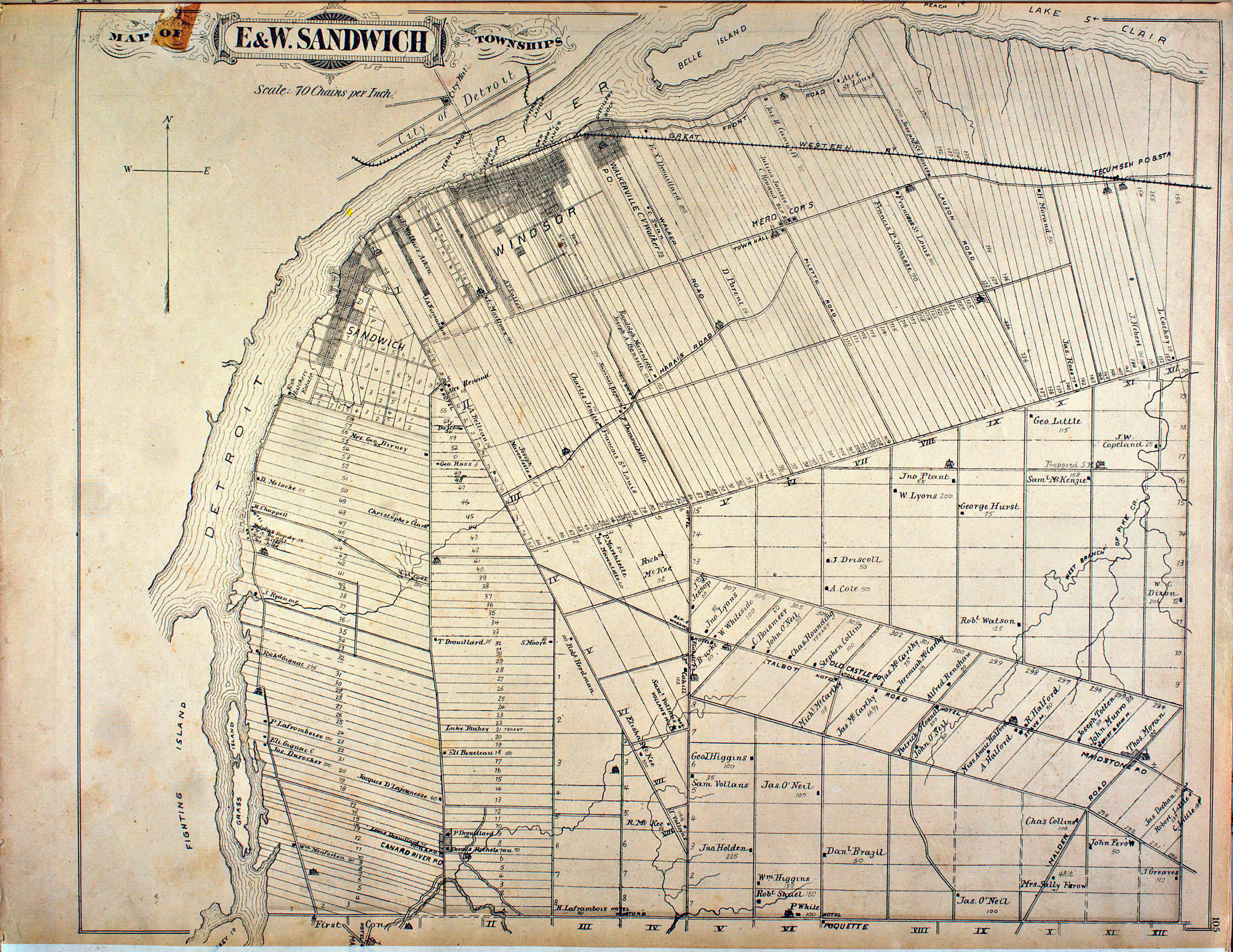
Windsor as depicted in an 1881 map of East and West Sandwich Township. From the Illustrated atlas of the Dominion of Canada.

The François Baby House in downtown Windsor was built in 1812 and houses Windsor's Community Museum dedicated to local history.

Windsor was the site of a battle during the 1838 Upper Canada Rebellion. It was attacked by a band of 400 Americans and rebels from Detroit who burned a steamboat and two or three houses before being routed by the local militia. Later that year, Windsor also served as a theatre for the Patriot War.

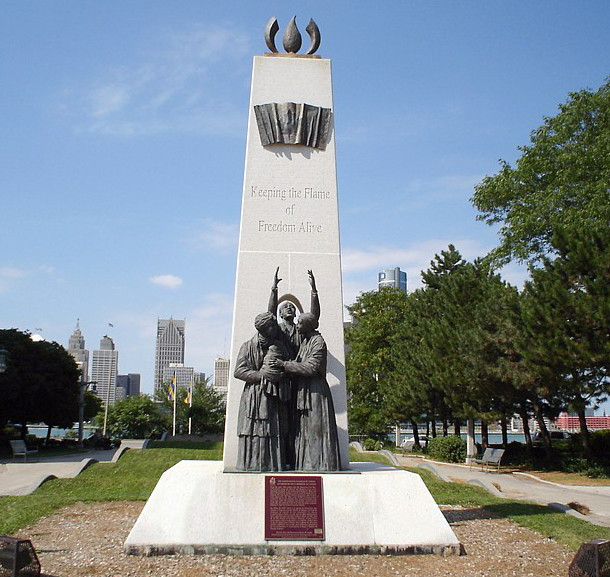
Underground Railroad Monument

In 1846, Windsor had a population of about 300. Two steamboats offered service to Detroit. The barracks were still in operation. There were various tradespeople and other occupations, including bank agencies and post offices. The city's access to the Canada–US border made it an essential stop for refugee enslaved people gaining freedom in the northern United States along the Underground Railroad. Many went across the Detroit River to Windsor to escape pursuit by slave catchers. There were estimated to be 20,000 to 30,000 African-American refugees who settled in Canada, with many settling in Essex County, Ontario.

Windsor was incorporated as a village in 1854 (the same year the village was connected to the rest of Canada by the Grand Trunk Railway/Canadian National Railway), then became a town in 1858, and gained city status in 1892.

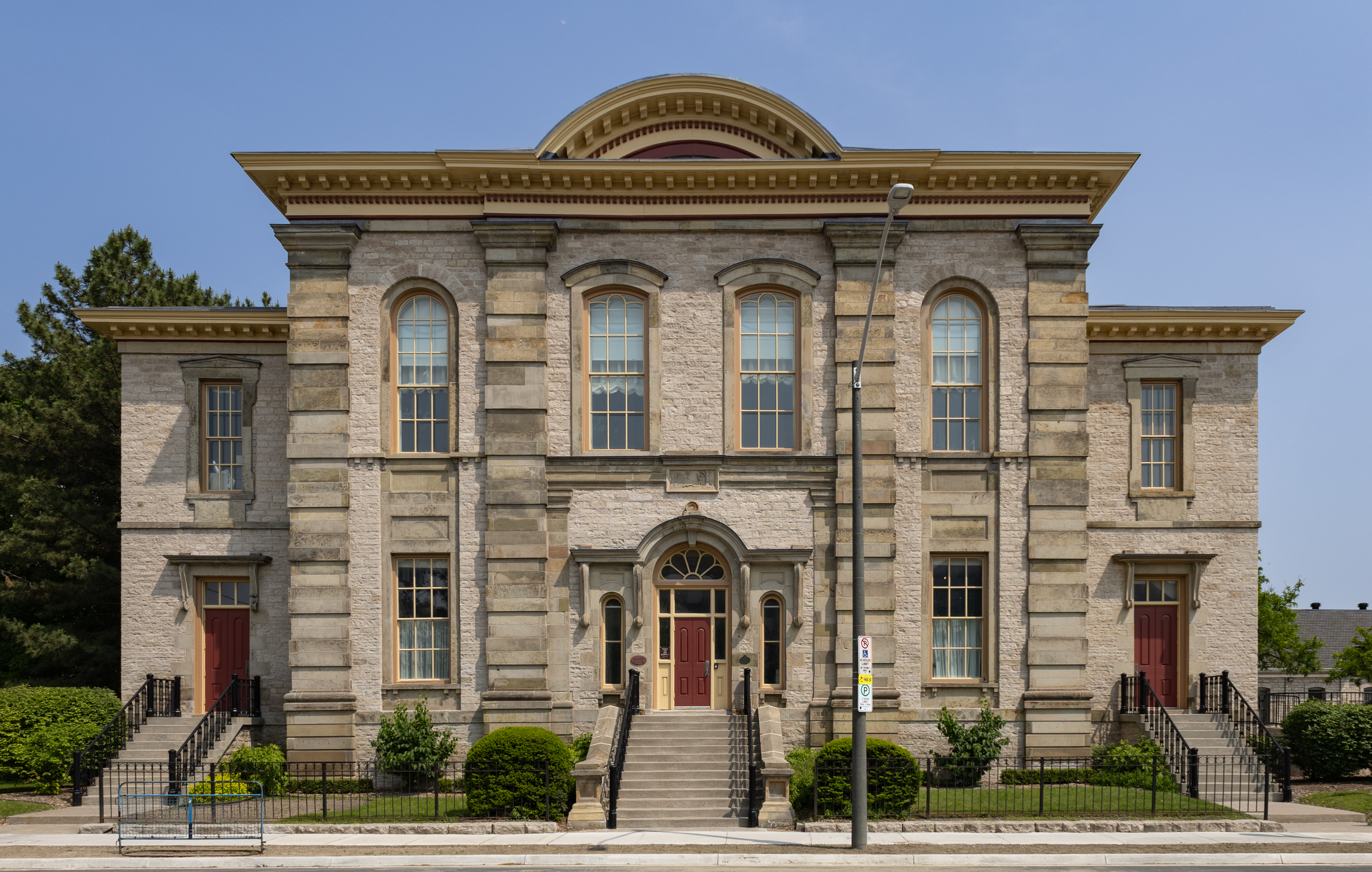
Mackenzie Hall

The Windsor Police Service was established on July 1, 1867.

A fire consumed much of Windsor's downtown core on October 12, 1871, destroying over 100 buildings.

The Windsor Star Centennial Edition in 1992 covered the city's past, its success as a railway centre, and its contributions to World War I and World War II fighting efforts. It also recalled the naming controversy in 1892 when Windsor aimed to become a city. The most popular names listed in the naming controversy were South Detroit, The Ferry (from the ferries that linked Windsor to Detroit), Windsor, and Richmond (the runner-up in popularity). Windsor was chosen to promote the heritage of new English settlers in the city and to recognize Windsor Castle in Berkshire, England. However, Richmond was a popular name used until World War II, mainly by the local post office.

=== 20th century ===
Sandwich, Ford City and Walkerville were separate legal entities (towns) until 1935. They are now historic neighbourhoods of Windsor. Ford City was incorporated as a village in 1912; it became a town in 1915 and a city in 1929. Walkerville was incorporated as a town in 1890. Sandwich was established in 1817 as a town with no municipal status. It was incorporated as a town in 1858 (the same year as neighbouring Windsor).

Windsor annexed these three towns in 1935. The nearby villages of Ojibway and Riverside were incorporated in 1913 and 1921, respectively. Both were annexed by Windsor in 1966. During the 1920s, alcohol prohibition was enforced in Michigan while alcohol was legal in Ontario. Rum-running in Windsor was a common practice then.

On October 25, 1960, a massive gas explosion destroyed the building housing the Metropolitan Store on Ouellette Avenue. Ten people were killed, and at least one hundred were injured. The Windsor Star commemorated the 45th anniversary of the event on October 25, 2005.

== Climate ==
Windsor

Climate chart (precipitation, max. and min. temperature)
J	F	M	A	M	J	J	A	S	O	N	D
71 0 −7	60 1 −6	71 7 −2	92 14 4	97 21 10	83 26 16	99 28 18	76 27 17	88 23 13	74 16 7	73 9 1	69 3 −4
- █ Average max. and min. temperatures in °C
- █ Precipitation totals in mm
Imperial conversion
J	F	M	A	M	J	J	A	S	O	N	D
2.8 32 19	2.4 34 20	2.8 44 28	3.6 57 38	3.8 69 50	3.3 79 60	3.9 83 64	3 81 63	3.5 74 55	2.9 61 44	2.9 48 35	2.7 37 26
- █ Average max. and min. temperatures in °F
- █ Precipitation totals in inches

Windsor has a humid continental climate (Köppen climate classification Dfa) which closely borders a humid subtropical climate (Köppen climate classification Cfa) using the −3 °C (27 °F) isotherm for the Riverside weather station due to a January mean temperature being right about that temperature, with four distinct seasons. Among cities in Ontario, Windsor has the warmest climate. The mean annual temperature is 10.1 °C (50 °F) at the Airport, 10.8 °C (51 °F) Downtown, among the warmest in Canada primarily due to its hot summers. Some locations in coastal and lower mainland British Columbia have a slightly higher mean annual temperature due to milder winter conditions there. The coldest temperature ever recorded in Windsor was −32.8 °C (−27.0 °F) on January 29, 1873, and the warmest was 40.2 °C (104.4 °F) on June 25, 1988.

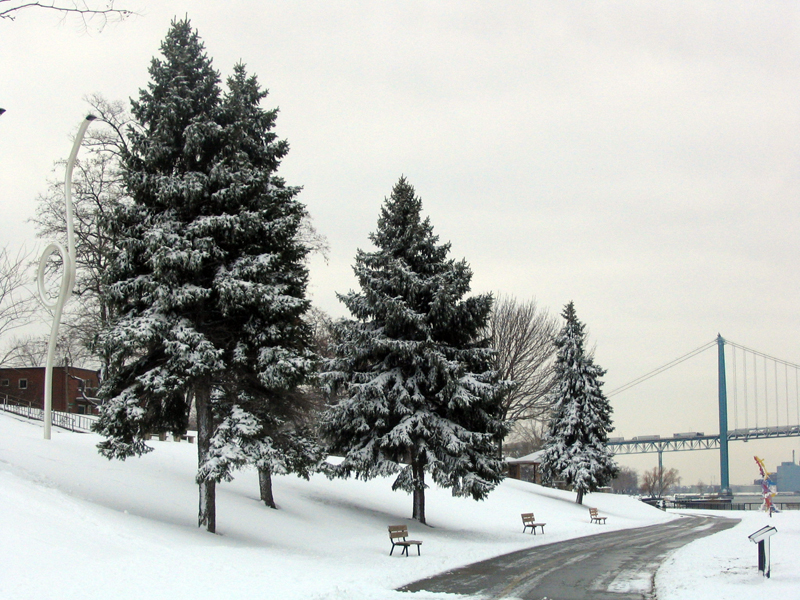

Winters in Windsor are cold. The January mean temperature averages −3.6 °C (25.5 °F) Airport, −2.9 °C (26.8 °F) Downtown. Occasional bitter cold outbreaks do occur, often accompanied by wind chills exacerbating the feel to exposed skin; these tend to be short-lived. The city occasionally sees lake-effect snow that originates from distant Lake Michigan. Snow cover is intermittent throughout the winter; on average, there are 46 days each year with at least some measurable snow falling. There are typically three to five major snowfalls each winter.

Summers are very warm to hot and humid, with a July mean temperature of 23.2 °C (74 °F) Airport, 23.8 °C (75 °F) Downtown (with the highest climatological Summer mean temperature average in Canada). The humidex (combined feel of temperature and humidity) reaches 30 °C (86 °F) or higher on over 70 days in an average summer; the highest recorded humidex in Ontario of 52.1 °C (125.8 °F), occurred on June 20, 1953, in Windsor. Thunderstorms are common during summer and occur on average 32 days per year, some of them severe with high winds, heavy rainfall, flooding, intense lightning, hail and less often, tornadic activity. Windsor has the highest number of days per year with lightning, haze, and daily maximum humidex over 30 °C (86 °F) of cities in Canada. Windsor has Canada's warmest climatological Fall season, with the highest mean temperatures for September, October and November. Precipitation is generally well-distributed throughout the year, on average driest in February, wettest in July. There are 2,261 sunshine average sunshine hours per year, or 52% of possible.

The record high daily minimum was 27.2 °C (81.0 °F) recorded August 12, 1943, at Windsor Airport. The record highest dew point at Windsor Airport was 28.9 °C (84.0 °F) recorded June 20, 1953. The most humid month at Windsor Airport was August 1995 with an average dew point of 19.6 °C (67.3 °F). The warmest month at Windsor Airport was July 2011 with an average mean temperature of 25.7 °C (78.3 °F), the highest average monthly daily minimum of 20.6 °C (69.1 °F), no daily maximum temperature below 26.1 °C (79.0 °F) for the entire month, and daily minimum temperatures staying at or above 16.1 °C (61.0 °F) throughout the month. The month with the highest monthly average daily maximum was July 1887 at 31.8 °C (89.2 °F), and at Windsor Airport was July 1988 at 31.3 °C (88.3 °F). August 2016 recorded no dew point below 10.9 °C (51.6 °F) throughout the entire month at Windsor Airport.

The lowest yearly maximum dew point is 23.1 °C (73.6 °F) recorded in 1999 at Windsor Airport. The lowest yearly maximum daily minimum temperature is 20.0 °C (68.0 °F) recorded in 1904; and at Windsor Airport 20.6 °C (69.1 °F) in 1962. The lowest yearly maximum temperature is 30.0 °C (86.0 °F) recorded in 1907, and at Windsor Airport 31.8 °C (89.2 °F) in 2023.

The average yearly maximum dew point is 24.9 °C (76.8 °F) and the average yearly maximum daily minimum temperature is 23.8 °C (74.8 °F).

Climate data for Windsor Airport, 1991−2020 normals, extremes 1940−present
Month	Jan	Feb	Mar	Apr	May	Jun	Jul	Aug	Sep	Oct	Nov	Dec	Year
Record high humidex	18.1	22.5	32.3	35.7	42.3	52.1	50.9	47.5	46.9	39.2	28.1	24.1	52.1
Record high °C (°F)	17.8 (64.0)	21.4 (70.5)	28.4 (83.1)	31.1 (88.0)	34.0 (93.2)	40.3 (104.5)	38.3 (100.9)	37.7 (99.9)	37.2 (99.0)	32.2 (90.0)	26.1 (79.0)	19.6 (67.3)	40.2 (104.4)
Mean maximum °C (°F)	10.9 (51.6)	12.0 (53.6)	19.4 (66.9)	25.5 (77.9)	30.1 (86.2)	33.4 (92.1)	34.0 (93.2)	33.0 (91.4)	31.2 (88.2)	26.5 (79.7)	18.4 (65.1)	12.7 (54.9)	34.9 (94.8)
Mean daily maximum °C (°F)	0.0 (32.0)	1.3 (34.3)	6.8 (44.2)	14.0 (57.2)	20.7 (69.3)	26.0 (78.8)	28.3 (82.9)	27.0 (80.6)	23.1 (73.6)	16.1 (61.0)	8.9 (48.0)	2.7 (36.9)	14.6 (58.3)
Daily mean °C (°F)	−3.6 (25.5)	−2.6 (27.3)	2.4 (36.3)	8.8 (47.8)	15.3 (59.5)	20.8 (69.4)	23.2 (73.8)	22.1 (71.8)	18.1 (64.6)	11.6 (52.9)	5.2 (41.4)	−0.4 (31.3)	10.1 (50.2)
Mean daily minimum °C (°F)	−7.1 (19.2)	−6.4 (20.5)	−2.1 (28.2)	3.5 (38.3)	9.8 (49.6)	15.5 (59.9)	18.0 (64.4)	17.1 (62.8)	13.0 (55.4)	6.9 (44.4)	1.4 (34.5)	−3.5 (25.7)	5.5 (41.9)
Mean minimum °C (°F)	−17.2 (1.0)	−15.6 (3.9)	−11.1 (12.0)	−3.4 (25.9)	3.0 (37.4)	8.8 (47.8)	12.8 (55.0)	11.9 (53.4)	5.8 (42.4)	0.0 (32.0)	−6.1 (21.0)	−12.5 (9.5)	−19.3 (−2.7)
Record low °C (°F)	−29.1 (−20.4)	−26.7 (−16.1)	−22 (−8)	−9.5 (14.9)	−2.8 (27.0)	2.8 (37.0)	5.6 (42.1)	5.2 (41.4)	−1.1 (30.0)	−5 (23)	−15.6 (3.9)	−23.4 (−10.1)	−29.1 (−20.4)
Record low wind chill	−42.4	−36	−27.5	−18	−7.5	0.0	0.0	0.0	0.0	−11	−25.2	−35.3	−42.4
Average precipitation mm (inches)	70.8 (2.79)	60.0 (2.36)	71.0 (2.80)	92.2 (3.63)	97.3 (3.83)	82.9 (3.26)	99.3 (3.91)	75.7 (2.98)	88.3 (3.48)	73.9 (2.91)	73.2 (2.88)	69.2 (2.72)	953.8 (37.55)
Average rainfall mm (inches)	39.1 (1.54)	34.3 (1.35)	50.9 (2.00)	86.5 (3.41)	97.7 (3.85)	83.7 (3.30)	99.3 (3.91)	75.7 (2.98)	88.0 (3.46)	72.2 (2.84)	70.6 (2.78)	47.2 (1.86)	845.2 (33.28)
Average snowfall cm (inches)	43.4 (17.1)	33.2 (13.1)	22.5 (8.9)	5.6 (2.2)	0.0 (0.0)	0.0 (0.0)	0.0 (0.0)	0.0 (0.0)	0.0 (0.0)	0.2 (0.1)	5.0 (2.0)	29.9 (11.8)	139.8 (55.0)
Average precipitation days (≥ 0.2 mm)	16.7	12.7	13.0	13.8	13.2	11.5	11.5	10.3	10.2	11.8	11.8	14.7	151.1
Average rainy days (≥ 0.2 mm)	7.3	5.4	8.9	13.0	13.1	11.7	11.5	10.3	10.0	11.8	10.2	8.4	121.6
Average snowy days (≥ 0.2 cm)	13.3	10.1	6.9	2.0	0.0	0.0	0.0	0.0	0.0	0.26	2.9	10.4	45.8
Average relative humidity (%) (at 1500)	70.2	65.6	59.3	53.2	54.1	53.0	53.9	57.5	56.2	57.6	64.0	70.8	59.6
Average dew point °C (°F)	−7.1 (19.2)	−6.7 (19.9)	−3.1 (26.4)	1.9 (35.4)	8.5 (47.3)	13.9 (57.0)	16.5 (61.7)	16.5 (61.7)	12.7 (54.9)	6.3 (43.3)	0.5 (32.9)	−3.9 (25.0)	4.7 (40.5)
Mean monthly sunshine hours	105.4	124.3	167.4	198.0	260.4	270.0	294.5	257.3	210.0	170.5	123.0	80.6	2,261.4
Mean daily sunshine hours	3.4	4.4	5.4	6.6	8.4	9.0	9.5	8.3	7.0	5.5	4.1	2.6	6.2
Source 1: Environment Canada
Source 2: (sunshine hours only); weatherstats.ca (for dewpoint and monthly&yearly average absolute maximum&minimum temperature)

Climate data for Windsor (Riverside), 1991−2020 normals, extremes 1866–present
Month	Jan	Feb	Mar	Apr	May	Jun	Jul	Aug	Sep	Oct	Nov	Dec	Year
Record high °C (°F)	19.4 (66.9)	22.0 (71.6)	28.5 (83.3)	32.2 (90.0)	35.0 (95.0)	36.7 (98.1)	39.0 (102.2)	38.5 (101.3)	38.3 (100.9)	32.5 (90.5)	25.5 (77.9)	21.0 (69.8)	39.0 (102.2)
Mean daily maximum °C (°F)	0.5 (32.9)	2.3 (36.1)	7.8 (46.0)	14.8 (58.6)	21.5 (70.7)	27.0 (80.6)	29.2 (84.6)	28.0 (82.4)	24.3 (75.7)	17.0 (62.6)	9.5 (49.1)	3.2 (37.8)	15.4 (59.7)
Daily mean °C (°F)	−2.9 (26.8)	−1.6 (29.1)	3.1 (37.6)	9.4 (48.9)	15.8 (60.4)	21.5 (70.7)	23.8 (74.8)	22.9 (73.2)	19.1 (66.4)	12.4 (54.3)	5.7 (42.3)	0.2 (32.4)	10.8 (51.4)
Mean daily minimum °C (°F)	−6.3 (20.7)	−5.6 (21.9)	−1.6 (29.1)	4.0 (39.2)	10.1 (50.2)	16.0 (60.8)	18.4 (65.1)	17.8 (64.0)	13.9 (57.0)	7.7 (45.9)	1.9 (35.4)	−2.9 (26.8)	6.1 (43.0)
Record low °C (°F)	−32.8 (−27.0)	−29.4 (−20.9)	−24.4 (−11.9)	−13.3 (8.1)	−3.3 (26.1)	2.8 (37.0)	4.4 (39.9)	5.0 (41.0)	−1.1 (30.0)	−7.2 (19.0)	−18.9 (−2.0)	−29.4 (−20.9)	−32.8 (−27.0)
Average precipitation mm (inches)	70.2 (2.76)	61.7 (2.43)	65.1 (2.56)	88.1 (3.47)	94.1 (3.70)	80.3 (3.16)	86.5 (3.41)	90.7 (3.57)	93.6 (3.69)	69.1 (2.72)	70.7 (2.78)	64.8 (2.55)	935.1 (36.81)
Average rainfall mm (inches)	37.3 (1.47)	35.4 (1.39)	48.9 (1.93)	83.5 (3.29)	94.0 (3.70)	80.3 (3.16)	86.5 (3.41)	90.7 (3.57)	93.6 (3.69)	69.1 (2.72)	65.7 (2.59)	43.4 (1.71)	828.4 (32.61)
Average snowfall cm (inches)	32.9 (13.0)	26.3 (10.4)	16.2 (6.4)	4.6 (1.8)	0.2 (0.1)	0.0 (0.0)	0.0 (0.0)	0.0 (0.0)	0.0 (0.0)	0.0 (0.0)	5.0 (2.0)	21.4 (8.4)	106.7 (42.0)
Average precipitation days (≥ 0.2 mm)	15.7	12.3	11.9	13.2	13.9	11.2	10.8	10.0	9.7	11.2	11.6	14.4	145.9
Average rainy days (≥ 0.2 mm)	6.4	5.1	8.3	12.5	13.9	11.2	10.8	10.0	9.7	11.2	9.7	7.9	116.6
Average snowy days (≥ 0.2 cm)	10.9	8.6	4.9	1.4	0.07	0.0	0.0	0.0	0.0	0.0	2.4	8.1	36.2
Source: Environment Canada

=== Flooding and other emergencies ===
Windsor experienced historic flooding in 2016, 2017 and 2019. In 2016, the mayor of Windsor, Drew Dilkens, declared a state of emergency because of the disastrous flooding that occurred. In spring of 2019 Windsor applied for disaster mitigation funding following widespread flooding.

A previous state of emergency in Windsor was called in 2013 when a fire broke out at a plastic recycling warehouse. This state of emergency was called due to poor air quality caused by the fire.

In 2017, Windsor was noted on Environment Canada's top 10 list of weather events. In late August 2017, Windsor faced a storm that left 285 millimetres (11.2 in) of rain in 32 hours.

=== Tornadoes ===
As the Canadian city with the highest number of days that experience severe thunderstorms and lightning, Windsor has historically been subject to tornadoes and severe weather. Notably, Windsor is located in the middle of "Tornado Alley". The strongest and deadliest tornado to touch down in Windsor was an F4 in 1946. Windsor was the only Canadian city to experience a tornado during the 1974 Super Outbreak, an F3 which killed nine people when it destroyed the Windsor Curling Club. The city was grazed by the 1997 Southeast Michigan tornado outbreak, with one tornado (an F1) forming east of the city. Tornadoes have been recorded crossing the Detroit River (in 1946 and 1997), and waterspouts are regularly seen over Lake St. Clair and Lake Erie, especially in autumn.

On April 25, 2009, an F0 tornado briefly touched down in the eastern part of the city, causing minor damage to nearby buildings, most notably a CUPE union hall.

Two tornadoes (an F1 and an F2) touched down in the evening of August 24, 2016, causing damage in parts of Windsor as well as LaSalle.

== Cityscape ==
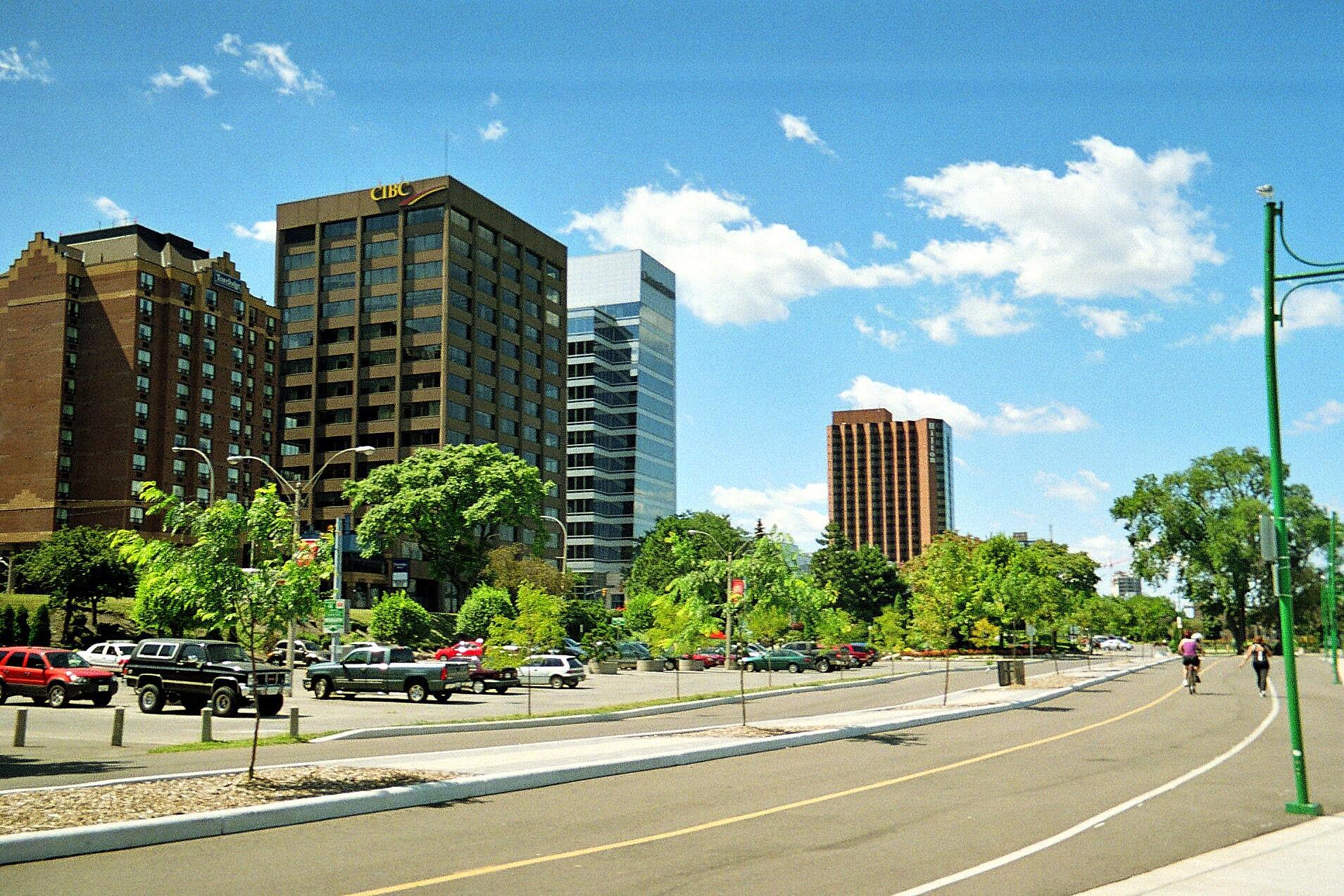
Windsor's Riverside Drive looking west and Riverfront Bike Trail from Dieppe Gardens

=== House numbering ===
Ouellette Avenue is the historic main commercial street in downtown Windsor. It runs north–south, perpendicular to the Detroit River, and divides the city into east and west sections. Roads that cross Ouellette Avenue include the directional components East and West after their names. Address numbers on east–west roads in Windsor increase by 100 for each block travelled away from Ouellette Avenue and address numbers on north–south roads increase by 100 for each block travelled away from the Detroit River. In areas where the river curves, some numbers on north–south roads are skipped. For consistency across the city, all address numbers on north–south roads reset at either 600 for streets west of Walker Road or 800 for those to the east, where the road crosses Wyandotte Street (which roughly parallels the Detroit River).

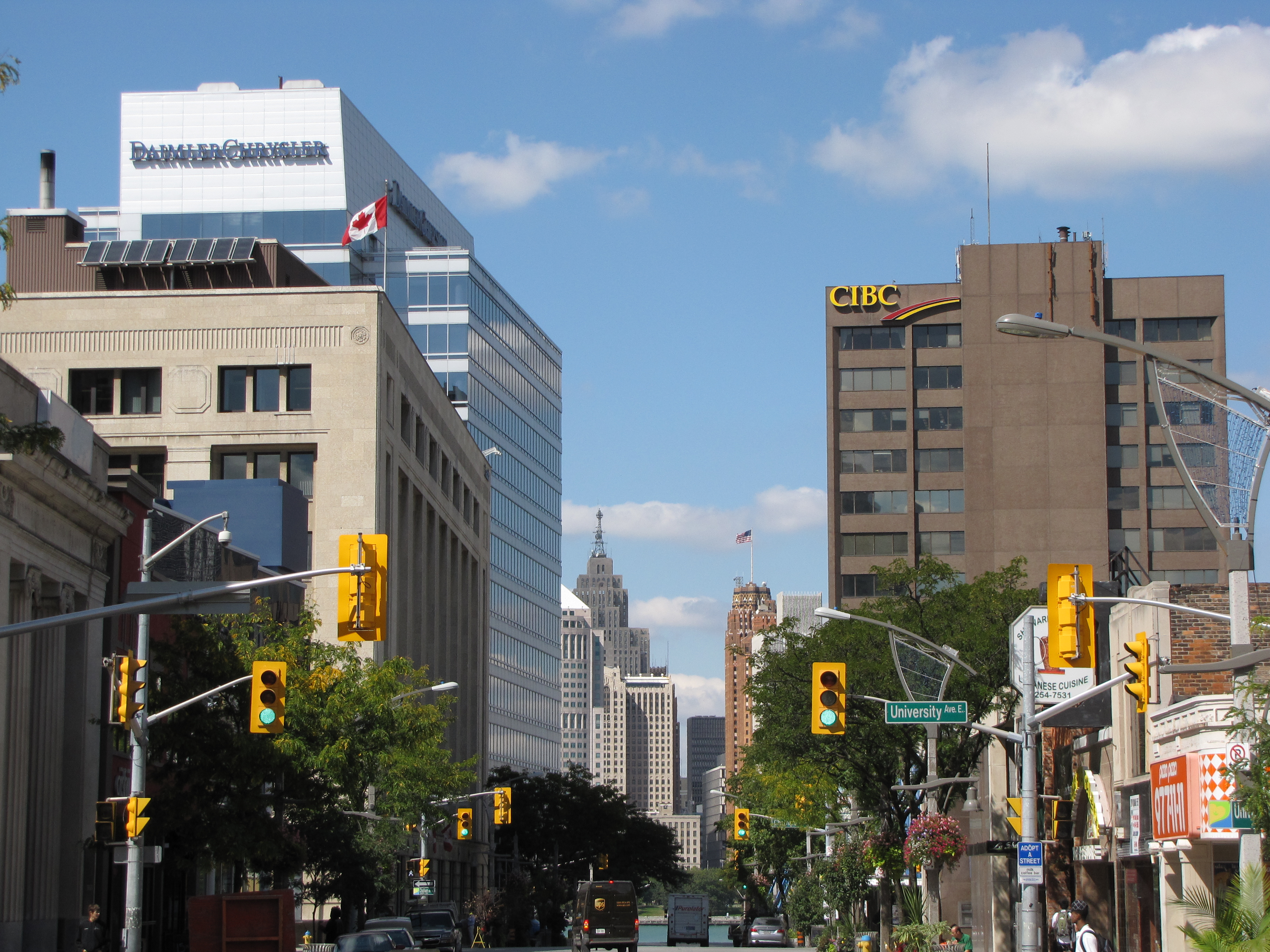
Downtown Windsor looking north along Ouellette Avenue toward Detroit

=== Parks ===
Windsor's Department of Parks and Recreation maintains 1,200 hectares (3,000 acres) of green space, 180 parks, 64 kilometres (40 miles) of trails, 35 km (22 mi) of sidewalks, 60 parking lots, vacant lands, natural areas and forest cover within the city of Windsor. The largest park is Mic Mac Park, which can accommodate many activities, including baseball, soccer, biking, and sledding. Windsor has numerous bike trails, the largest being the Ganatchio Trail on the city's far east side. In recent years, the city council has pushed for adding bicycle lanes on city streets to provide links throughout the existing trail network.

The Windsor trail network is linked to the LaSalle Trail in the west end and is to eventually be connected to the Chrysler Canada Greenway (part of the Trans Canada Trail). The current greenway is a 42-kilometre (26 mi) former railway corridor converted into a multi-use recreational trail, underground utility corridor and natural green space. It begins south of Oldcastle and continues south through McGregor, Harrow, Kingsville, and Ruthven. The Greenway is a fine trail for hiking, biking, running, birding, cross-country skiing and, in some areas, horseback riding. It connects natural areas, rich agricultural lands, historically and architecturally significant structures, and award-winning wineries. A separate five-kilometre (3.1 mi) landscaped trail traverses the riverfront between downtown and the Ambassador Bridge. Part of this trail winds through Windsor Sculpture Park, which displays various modern and post-modern sculptures. Families of elephants (see picture), penguins, horses, and many other themed sculptures are found in the park. Some other popular exhibits include the Chicken and Egg, Consophia, and Eve's Apple.

== Economy ==
Windsor's economy is primarily based on manufacturing, tourism, education, and government services.

The city is one of Canada's major automobile manufacturing centres and is home to the headquarters of Stellantis Canada. Automotive facilities include the Stellantis Canada minivan assembly plant, two Ford Motor Company engine plants, and several tool and die and automotive parts manufacturers. As of 2025, automotive manufacturing industries accounted for 7.3% of total jobs in the Windsor – Sarnia Corridor. The city's leaders warned the public of potential "catastrophic" repercussions to the economy, due to its reliance on the auto sector.

Windsor has a well-established tourism industry. Caesars Windsor, one of the largest casinos in Canada, ranks as one of the largest local employers. It has been a significant draw for U.S. visitors since opening in 1994 (as Casino Windsor). Further, the 1,150-kilometre-long (710 mi) Quebec City – Windsor Corridor contains 18 million people, with 51% of the Canadian population and three out of the five largest metropolitan areas, according to the 2011 Census.

The city has an extensive riverfront parks system and fine restaurants, such as those on Erie Street in Windsor's Little Italy, "Via Italia". This is another popular tourist destination. The Lake Erie North Shore Wine Region in Essex County has enhanced tourism in the region.

Both the University of Windsor and St. Clair College are significant local employers and have enjoyed substantial growth and expansion in recent years. A full-program satellite medical school of the University of Western Ontario at the University of Windsor opened in 2008. In 2013, the university completed construction of a $112 million (~$152 million in 2025) facility for its Faculty of Engineering.

Windsor is the headquarters of Hiram Walker & Sons Limited, now owned by Pernod Ricard. Hiram Walker founded its historic distillery in 1858 in what was then Walkerville, Ontario.

The diversifying economy is also represented by companies involved in pharmaceuticals, alternative energy, insurance, internet, and software. Windsor is also home to the Windsor Salt Mine and the Great Lakes Regional office of the International Joint Commission.

=== Technology ===
There are a few established tech companies that have been in the region for years. Among them are Cypher Systems Group, a computer-based hardware wholesaler and software developer; AlphaKor Group, a technology company that provides IT services, custom software and mobile apps; and Red Piston, a media solutions company. There are also a few successful startups in area, including Sirved, a tech company that is building a restaurant discovery app; and Hackforge, a tech company that has built an app to compare hospital drive times, and has hosted a variety of tech-focused community events, such as a Wikipedia Hackathon.

The non-profit WEtech Alliance provides startups and local entrepreneurs with resources to get new technology companies started in the city.

In 2019, Dan Gilbert and Quicken Loans bought a building in Windsor with a plan to restore it. Once completed, Quicken Loans will employ 50–100 people, mainly in the technology sector. Many are hoping that this is a catalyst for more companies to establish tech business in Windsor.

LG and Stellantis have broken ground on a new alternative energy plant called Nextstar Energy.

=== Largest private-sector employers ===
- Stellantis Canada (approx. 3,500 employees)
- Caesars Windsor (approx. 2,100 employees)
- Ford Motor Company (approx. 1,880 employees)
- Sutherland Group Canada (approx. 1,350 employees)
- AP Plasman Corp. (Build a Mold) (approx. 950 employees)

=== Poverty ===
Due to a strong reliance on the manufacturing sector, Windsor has experienced high levels of poverty and unemployment—the highest in Southwestern Ontario. According to a study by an advocacy organization, Windsor West (one of Windsor's electoral districts) ranks 13th highest in poverty rates amongst the 338 federal ridings of Canada and 33% of its children live below the poverty line. Another researcher reported that Wards 2 (Sandwich/University District/West End) and 3 (City Centre) register some of the highest poverty rates at 44.65% and 44.94%, while wards 4 (Walkerville) and 8 (East Windsor) also register high poverty rates at 28.78% and 28.74% respectively.

== Demographics ==
Historical populations
Year	Pop.	±%
1871	4,253	—
1881	6,561	+54.3%
1891	10,322	+57.3%
1901	12,153	+17.7%
1911	17,829	+46.7%
1921	38,591	+116.5%
1931	63,108	+63.5%
1941	104,415	+65.5%
1951	120,049	+15.0%
1961	114,367	−4.7%
1971	203,300	+77.8%
1981	192,083	−5.5%
1991	191,435	−0.3%
1996	197,694	+3.3%
2001	208,402	+5.4%
2006	216,473	+3.9%
2011	210,891	−2.6%
2016	217,188	+3.0%
2021	229,660	+5.7%

In the 2021 Census of Population conducted by Statistics Canada, Windsor had a population of 229,660 living in 94,273 of its 99,803 total private dwellings, a change of 5.7% from its 2016 population of 217,188. With a land area of 146.02 km^{2} (56.38 sq mi), it had a population density of 1,572.8/km^{2} (4,073.5/sq mi) in 2021.

At the census metropolitan area (CMA) level in the 2021 census, the Windsor CMA had a population of 422,630 living in 165,665 of its 174,072 total private dwellings, a change of 6% from its 2016 population of 398,718. With a land area of 1,803.17 km^{2} (696.21 sq mi), it had a population density of 234.4/km^{2} (607.0/sq mi) in 2021.

Windsor attracts many immigrants from around the world. In 2016, in the city, 27.7% of the population was foreign-born, while in the metropolitan area, 22.9% was foreign-born; this is the fourth-highest proportion for a Canadian metropolitan area. Visible minorities makeup 25.7% of the population, making it the most diverse city in Ontario outside of the Greater Toronto Area.

In 2016, Windsor's population was 48.8% male and 51.2% female. Children under 15 accounted for 16.3% of the city population compared to 16.6% for Canada. Persons of age 65 years and over accounted for 17.6% of the population in Windsor compared to 16.9% for Canada. The median age in Windsor is 41.4 years compared to 41.2 years for Canada.

=== Ethnicity ===
Demographic Group, 2021
Group	Population	% of Pop.
White	150,455	65.5%
Arab	21,360	9.3%
South Asian	16,135	7.0%
Black	13,275	5.8%
Chinese	6,825	3.0%
First Nations	4,810	2.1%
West Asian	3,975	1.7%
Southeast Asian	3,720	1.6%
Filipino	3,500	1.5%
Latin American	3,205	1.4%
Mixed visible minority	2,590	1.1%
Métis	2,035	0.9%
Other visibile minority	870	0.4%
Korean	430	0.2%
Japanese	120	0.1%
Total population	229,660	100%

Ethnic Origin, 2021
Origin	Percentage
French	15.6%
English	14.3%
Irish	11.1%
Canadian	11.1%
Scottish	11.0%
Italian	8.1%
German	7.0%
Indian	3.4%
Polish	3.3%
Lebanese	3.2%
Chinese	3.0%
Iraqi	3.4%
Ukrainian	2.4%
multiple responses included

Largest ethnic origin in Windsor CMA by census tract based on the 2021 census

Panethnic groups in the City of Windsor (2001−2021)
Panethnic group	2021		2016		2011		2006		2001	
Panethnic group	Pop.	%	Pop.	%	Pop.	%	Pop.	%	Pop.	%
European (Note: Statistic includes all persons that did not makeup part of a visible minority or an indigenous identity.)	143,870	63.53%	150,815	70.48%	155,605	74.8%	165,235	77.12%	167,655	81.44%
Middle Eastern (Note: Statistic includes total responses of "West Asian" and "Arab" under visible minority section on census.)	25,335	11.19%	17,405	8.13%	13,090	6.29%	10,700	4.99%	8,485	4.12%
South Asian	16,135	7.12%	9,640	4.5%	8,020	3.86%	8,765	4.09%	5,655	2.75%
African	13,275	5.86%	10,675	4.99%	9,480	4.56%	8,400	3.92%	7,150	3.47%
East Asian (Note: Statistic includes total responses of "Chinese", "Korean", and "Japanese" under visible minority section on census.)	7,375	3.26%	7,765	3.63%	6,610	3.18%	7,415	3.46%	5,520	2.68%
Southeast Asian (Note: Statistic includes total responses of "Filipino" and "Southeast Asian" under visible minority section on census.)	6,925	3.06%	6,325	2.96%	6,370	3.06%	5,360	2.5%	5,005	2.43%
Indigenous	6,585	2.91%	5,565	2.6%	4,735	2.28%	3,960	1.85%	2,860	1.39%
Latin American	3,500	1.55%	2,670	1.25%	2,255	1.08%	2,650	1.24%	2,135	1.04%
Other/Multiracial (Note: Statistic includes total responses of "Visible minority, n.i.e." and "Multiple visible minorities" under visible minority section on census.)	3,460	1.53%	3,125	1.46%	1,850	0.89%	1,775	0.83%	1,385	0.67%
Total responses	226,460	98.61%	213,985	98.53%	208,015	98.64%	214,255	98.98%	205,865	98.78%
Total population	229,660	100%	217,188	100%	210,891	100%	216,473	100%	208,402	100%
Note: Totals greater than 100% due to multiple origin responses

=== Language ===
The population of Windsor is primarily English-speaking, with 88.5% of residents knowing only English and 8.8% of residents knowing both English and French.

=== Religion ===
Largest non-Christian religion in Windsor CMA by census tract based on the 2021 census

Religion, 2021
Religion	Percentage
Catholic	32.1%
No religion	26.9%
Protestant	19.4%
Muslim	11.2%
Orthodox	3.3%

== Crime ==
Windsor has a low violent crime rate and one of the lowest murder rates in Canada. In 2017, the Crime Severity Index for the Windsor Metropolitan Area was 71.7, compared to the Canadian national rate of 72.9. Of the five safest communities in Canada, four of them are in the Windsor Metropolitan Area (Amherstburg, LaSalle, Tecumseh, and Lakeshore). Windsor has made national headlines for its lack of homicides. There were no homicides in the city for a 27-month period ending in November 2011. Since 2016, reports of sexual assaults within Windsor, have increased by 20%, reports of robbery by 23%, reports of breaking and entering by 3% and reports of motor vehicle theft by 13%.

== Government ==
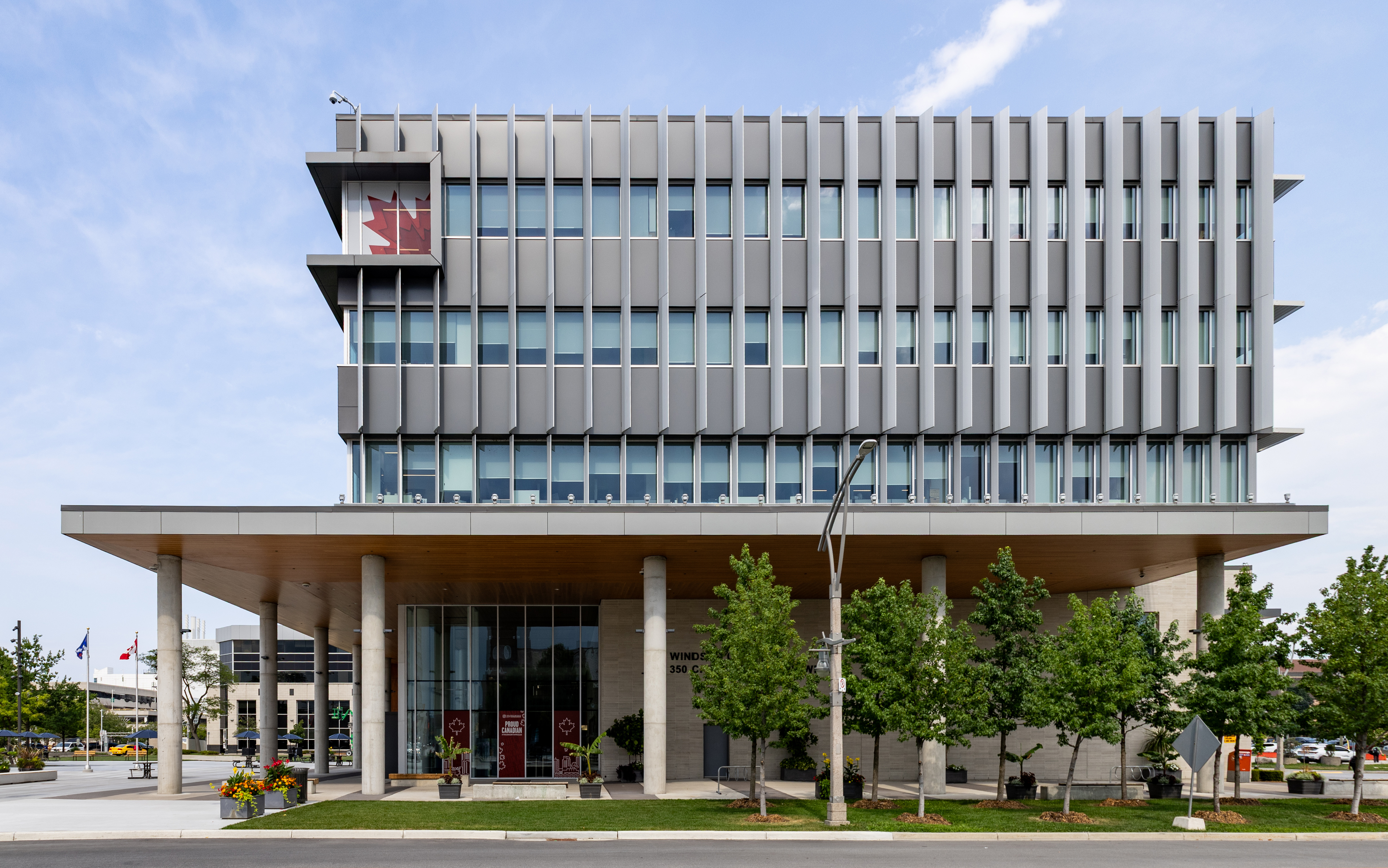
Windsor City Hall

Primary city logo designed in 2004

Windsor's history as an industrial centre has given the New Democratic Party (NDP) a dedicated voting base. During federal and provincial elections, Windsorites have maintained their local representation in the respective legislatures. The Liberal Party of Canada also has a solid electoral history in the city. Canada's 21st Prime Minister, Paul Martin, was born in Windsor. His father, Paul Martin Sr., a federal cabinet minister in several portfolios through the Liberal governments of the 1940s, 1950s and 1960s, was first elected to the House of Commons from a Windsor riding in the 1930s. Martin Sr. practised law in the city and the federal building on Ouellette Avenue is named after him. Eugene Whelan was a Liberal cabinet minister and one-time Liberal party leadership candidate elected from Essex County from the 1960s to the early 1980s, as well as Mark MacGuigan of Windsor-Walkerville riding, who also served as External Affairs, and later Justice minister in the early 1980s. Deputy Prime Minister Herb Gray represented Windsor as an MP from 1962 through 2003, winning thirteen consecutive elections, making him the longest-serving MP in Canadian history. A bust of Herb Gray is at the foot of Ouellette Avenue near Dieppe Park in downtown Windsor. The Rt. Hon. Herb Gray Parkway is named after him.

=== Current representation ===
The current mayor of Windsor is Drew Dilkens. Windsor is governed under the Council-Manager form of local government and includes the elected City Council, mayor, and an appointed Chief Administrative Officer. The city is divided into ten wards, with one councillor representing each ward. The mayor serves as the city's chief executive officer and functions as its ceremonial head. In August 2009, Windsor City Council approved a 10-ward electoral system for the 2010 civic election, with one councillor elected in each ward. Previously, there were two councillors elected in each ward, and there were only five wards. The plan doubled the number of wards, which had been unchanged for 30 years.

Past Canadian federal election results
Year	NDP		Green		Liberal		Conservative		PPC	
2025	16%	19,496	1%	865	39%	49,072	43%	53,502	1%	1,381
2021	37%	39,006	1%	682	30%	31,658	23%	24,020	9%	9,987
2019	36%	39,217	3%	3,502	35%	37,924	24%	25,776	2%	2,237
2015	47%	47,300	2%	2,130	26%	26,019	24%	24,390		
2011	52%	43,827	3%	2,450	12%	10,091	33%	27,522		

Past Ontario provincial election results
Year	NDP		Green		Liberal		PC		New Blue + Ontario	
2025	41%	33,113	2%	1,698	8%	6,337	45%	35,950	4%	2,966
2022	36%	24,946	3%	1,881	14%	9,757	42%	28,903	6%	4,113
2018	56%	45,497	4%	3,302	11%	9,235	28%	22,750		
2014	53%	37,861	5%	3,289	27%	19,600	15%	10,718		
2011	32%	22,772	3%	1,881	42%	30,073	23%	16,227		

At the provincial and federal levels, Windsor is divided into two ridings: Windsor West and Windsor—Tecumseh. The city is currently represented in the Legislative Assembly of Ontario by NDP MPP Lisa Gretzky (Windsor West) and Progressive Conservative MPP Andrew Dowie (Windsor—Tecumseh). In federal Parliament, Windsor is currently represented by Conservative Party of Canada MP Harb Gill (Windsor West) and Conservative Party of Canada MP Kathy Borrelli (Windsor—Tecumseh).

== Culture and tourism ==
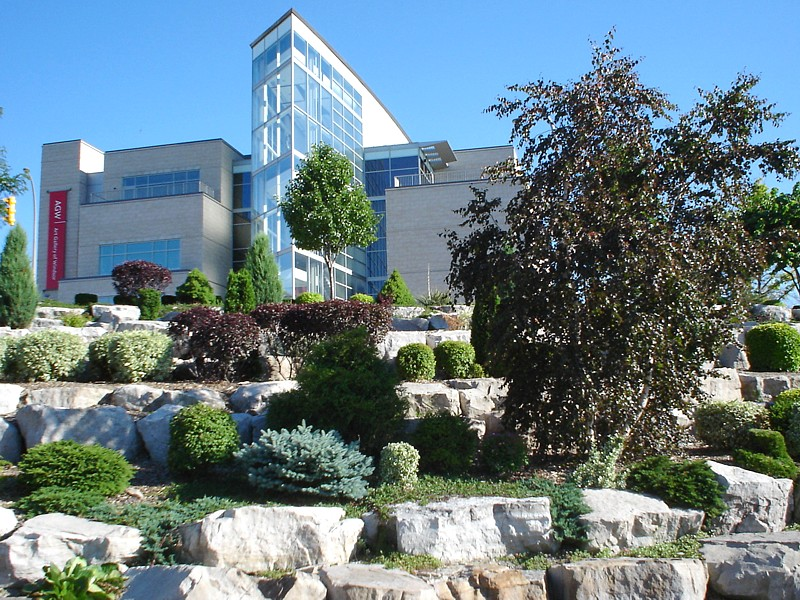
Art Windsor-Essex gallery overlooking riverfront rock gardens

Windsor tourist attractions include the Windsor International Film Festival, Caesars Windsor, a lively downtown club scene, Little Italy, the Windsor Symphony Orchestra, the Art Windsor-Essex gallery, the Odette Sculpture Park, Windsor Light Music Theatre, Adventure Bay Water Park, and Ojibway Park. As a border settlement, Windsor was a site of conflict during the War of 1812, a significant entry point into Canada for refugees from slavery via the Underground Railroad and a significant source of liquor during American Prohibition. Two sites in Windsor have been designated as National Historic Sites of Canada: the Sandwich First Baptist Church, a church established by Underground Railroad refugees, and François Bâby House, an important War of 1812 site now serving as Windsor's Community Museum.

The Capitol Theatre in downtown Windsor had been a venue for feature films, plays and other attractions since 1929 until it declared bankruptcy in 2007. The theatre is now used for live orchestral concerts, lectures and dance performances. The Tea Party is a progressive rock band which has been based in Windsor since its foundation in 1990.

Windsor's nickname is the "Rose City" or the "City of Roses". The Liebeszauber (Love's Magic) rose has been designated as the City of Windsor Rose. Windsor is noted for the several large parks and gardens found on its waterfront. The Queen Elizabeth II Sunken Garden is at Jackson Park in the central part of the city. A World War II era Avro Lancaster was displayed on a stand in the middle of Jackson Park for over four decades but has since been removed for restoration. This park is now home to a mounted Spitfire replica and a Hurricane replica.

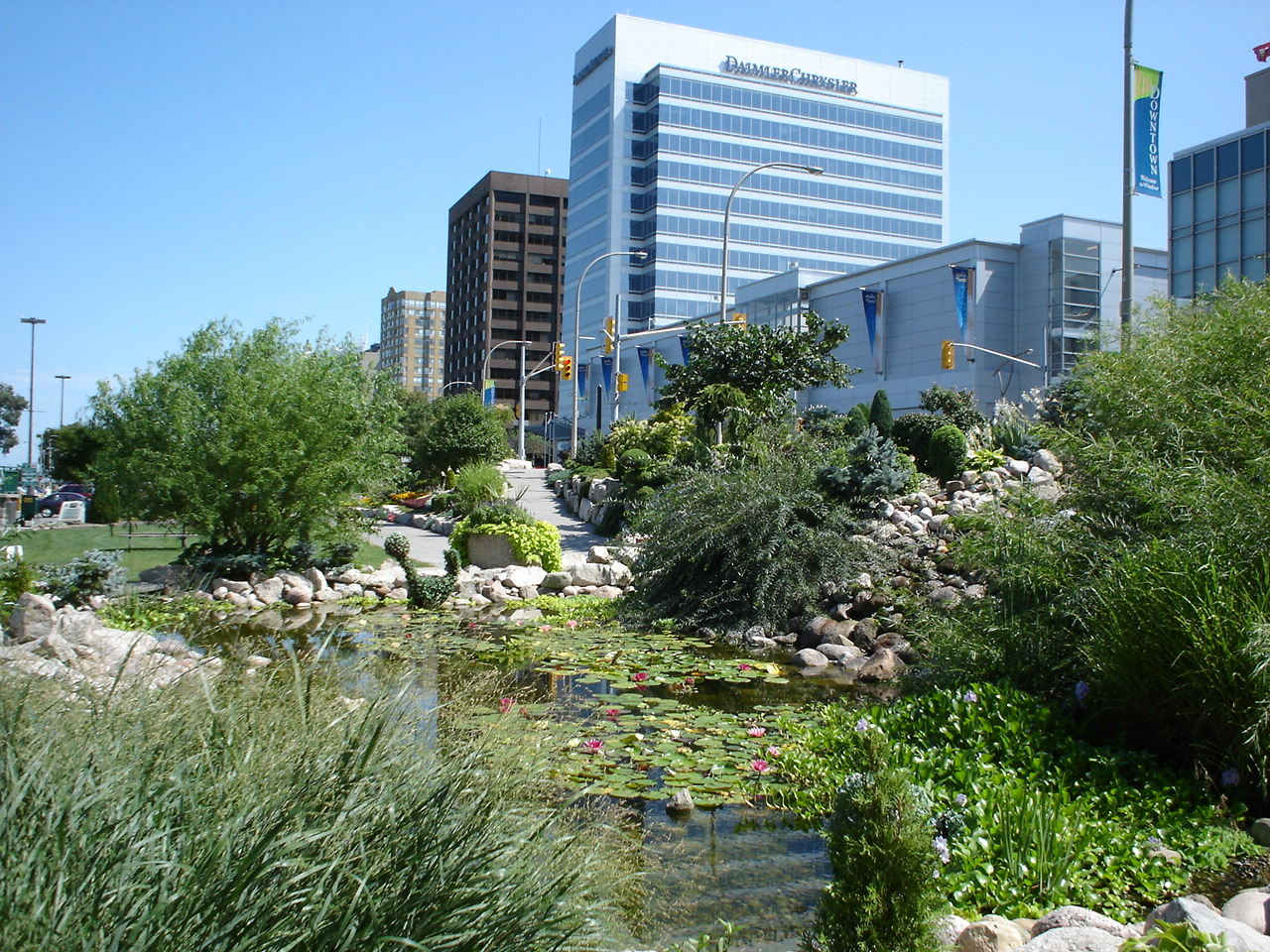
One Riverside Drive, Chrysler's Canada HQ in downtown Windsor, as seen from Dieppe Gardens along the riverfront

Of the parks lining Windsor's waterfront, the largest is the 5 km (3.1 mi) stretch overlooking the Detroit skyline. It extends from the Ambassador Bridge to the Hiram Walker Distillery. The western portion of the park contains the Windsor Sculpture Park, which features over 30 large-scale contemporary sculptures for public viewing, along with the Canadian Vietnam Veterans Memorial. The central portion contains Dieppe Gardens, Civic Terrace and Festival Plaza, and the eastern portion is home to the Bert Weeks Memorial Gardens. Further east along the waterfront is Coventry Gardens, across from Detroit's Belle Isle. The focal point of this park is the Charles Brooks Memorial Peace Fountain, which floats in the Detroit River and has a coloured light display at night. The fountain is the largest of its kind in North America and symbolizes the peaceful relationship between Canada and the United States.

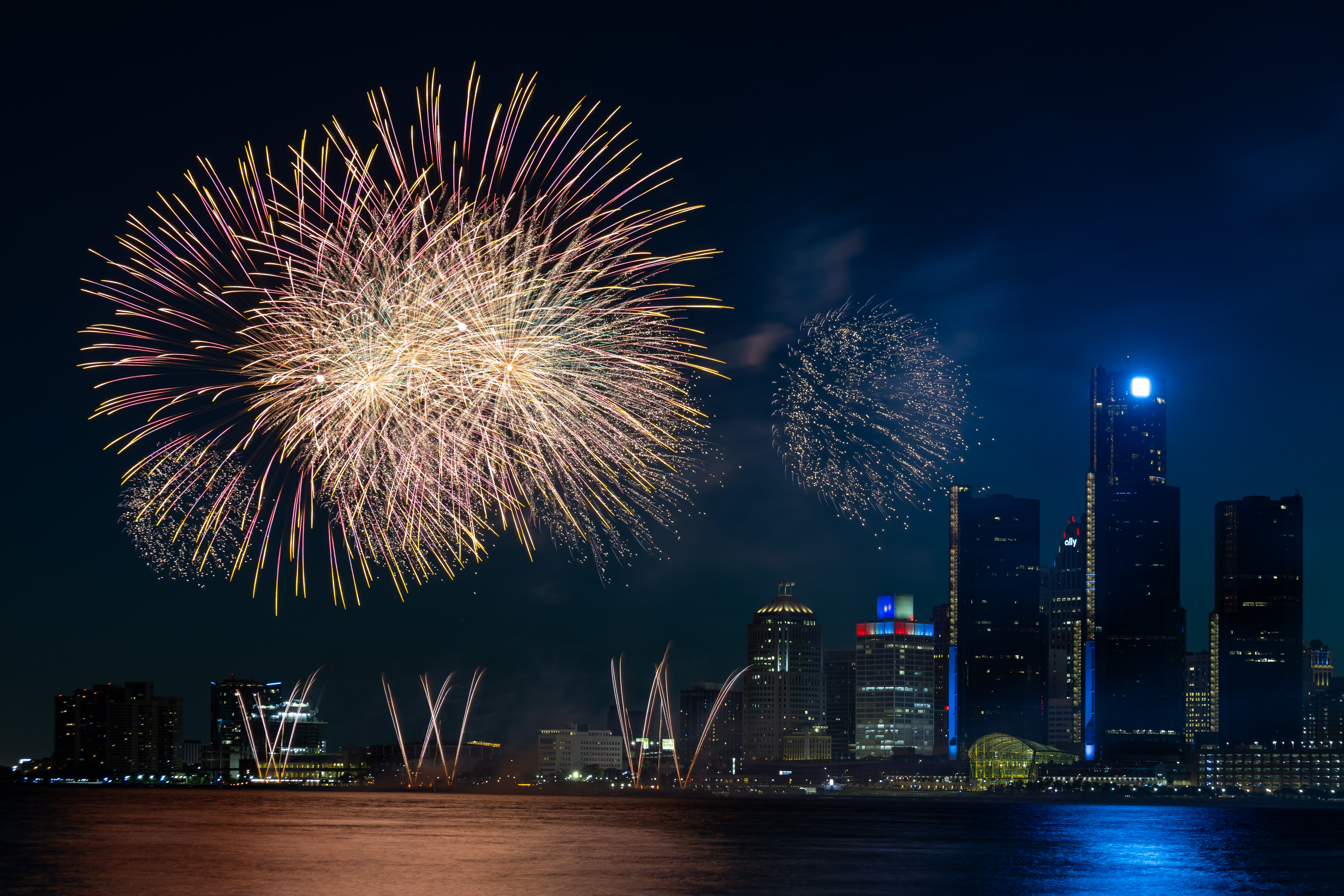
Fireworks at the Windsor-Detroit International Freedom Festival

Each summer, Windsor co-hosts the two-week-long Windsor-Detroit International Freedom Festival, which culminates in a gigantic fireworks display that celebrates Canada Day and the Fourth of July. The fireworks display is among the world's largest and takes place on the final Monday in June over the Detroit River between the two downtowns. Each year, the event attracts over a million spectators to both sides of the riverfront. Windsor and Detroit also jointly cohost the annual Detroit Windsor International Film Festival. At the same time, festivals exclusive to Windsor include the Multicultural Council of Windsor and Essex County Carrousel by the River and Carrousel Around the City, Bluesfest International Windsor and Windsor Pride.

Following the 2008 Red Bull Air Race World Championship in Detroit, Michigan, Windsor successfully put in a bid to become the first Canadian city to host the event. Red Bull touted the 2009 race in Windsor as one of the most exciting in the seven-year history of the Red Bull Air Race World Championship, and on January 22, 2010, it was announced Windsor would be a host city for the 2010 and 2011 circuits, along with a select group of major international cities that includes Abu Dhabi, United Arab Emirates, Perth, Australia and New York City. The event attracted 200,000 fans to the Detroit River waterfront in 2009. The Red Bull air races were cancelled worldwide for 2011.

Dubbed the Great Canadian Flag Project, Windsor erected a 150-foot (46-metre) flagpole to fly a 60 feet by 30 feet (9.1 metres) by nine metres) Canadian flag in celebration of the 150th anniversary of Canada. Spotlights illuminate the flag at night, with a smaller 24 by 12 feet (7.3 by 3.7 metres) flag to fly during periods of strong winds. As of January 14, 2017, $300,000 had been raised for the project, including $150,000 from the federal government.

Windsor has often been the place where many metro Detroiters find what is forbidden in the United States. With a minimum legal drinking age of 21 in Michigan and 19 in Ontario, a significant number of 19 and 20-year-old Americans frequent Windsor's bars. The city also became a gambling attraction with Caesars Windsor's opening in 1994, five years before casinos opened in Detroit. One can also purchase Cuban cigars, Cuban rum, less-costly prescription drugs, absinthe, certain imported foods, and other items not available in the United States. In addition, some same-sex couples from the United States chose to marry in Windsor prior to 2015, when same-sex marriage was legalized in all 50 U.S. states.

Windsor is also known for its own style of pizza, characterized by its thin crust using cornmeal and flour, high-fat cheese, shredded pepperoni, and canned mushrooms. Italian cuisine can also be further found within Erie Street in Little Italy, where locals enjoy to dine for traditional and modern Italian dishes. Other notable foods in Windsor include the Chicken Delight and shawarma.

=== Media ===
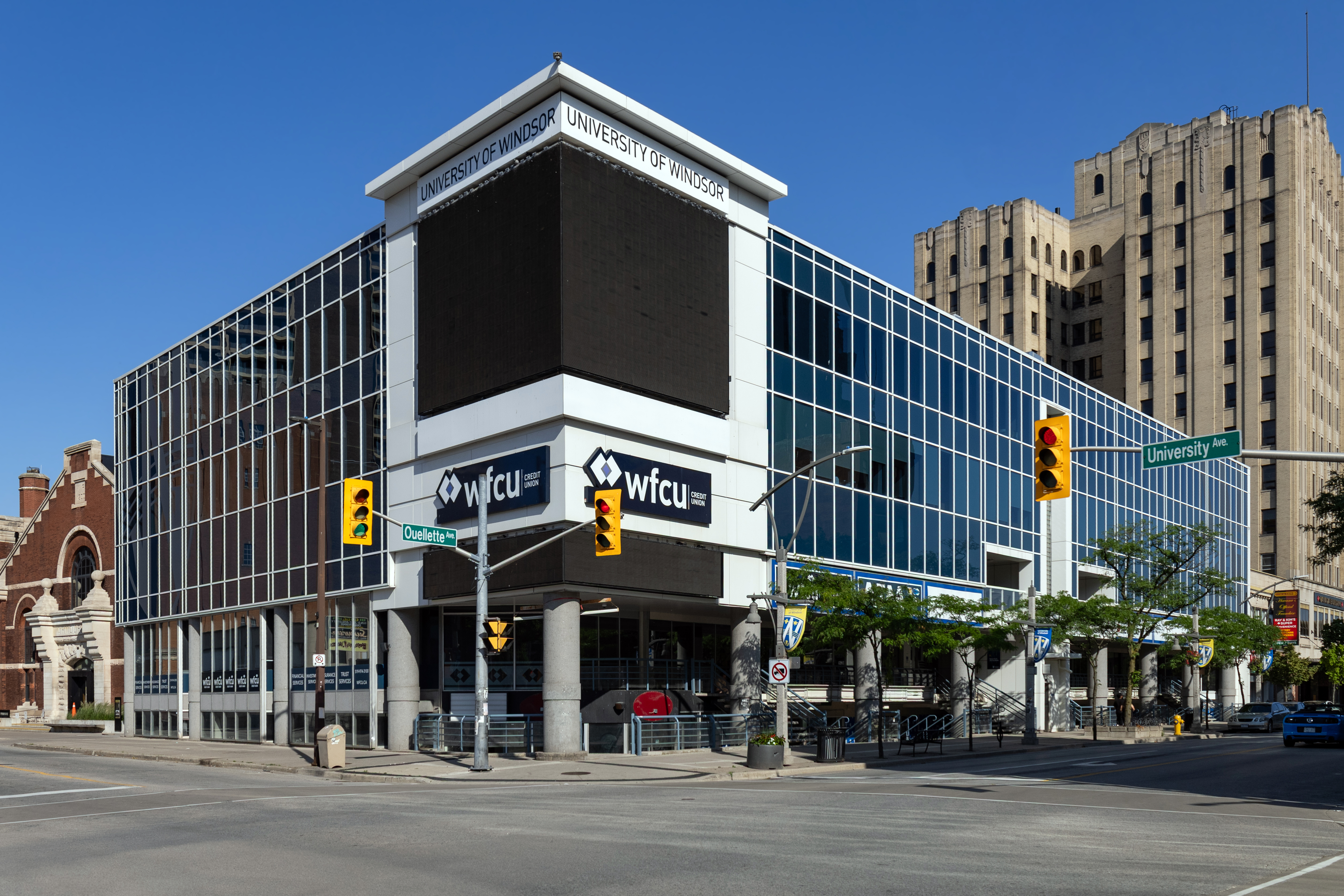
The former Windsor Star headquarters

Windsor and its surrounding area have been served by the Windsor Star since 1888. The regional newspaper is the only daily in Windsor and Essex County and has attracted the highest readership per capita in its circulation range of any Canadian metropolitan newspaper.

Windsor is considered part of the Detroit television and radio market for territorial rights. Due to this fact and its proximity to Toledo and Cleveland, radio and television broadcasters in Windsor are accorded a special status by the Canadian Radio-television and Telecommunications Commission, exempting them from many of the Canadian content ("CanCon") requirements most broadcasters in Canada are required to follow. The CanCon requirements are sometimes blamed in part for the decline in popularity of Windsor radio station CKLW, a 50,000-watt AM radio station that in the late 1960s (prior to the advent of CanCon) had been the top-rated radio station not only in Detroit and Windsor but also in Toledo and Cleveland.

Windsor has also been exempt from concentration of media ownership rules. Except for Blackburn Radio-owned stations CJWF-FM and a rebroadcaster of Chatham's CKUE-FM in Windsor, all other current commercial media outlets are owned by a single company, Bell Media.

The city is home to one campus radio station, CJAM-FM, situated on the University of Windsor campus. Windsor is also served by a few informational news websites including windsoriteDOTca News, a local news site; Radio Betna, a Middle Eastern community-based web radio station; and YQG Rocks, which is one of the only media to review entertainment shows since the retirement of Windsor Star critic Ted Shaw.

The Windsor Local is a local site and mobile app.

== Education ==
Windsor youth attend schools in the Greater Essex County District School Board (prior to 1998, the Windsor Board of Education), the Windsor-Essex Catholic District School Board, Conseil scolaire catholique Providence and Conseil scolaire Viamonde. Independent faith-based schools include Maranatha Christian Academy (JK-12), Canadian Christian Academy (JK-12), Académie Ste. Cécile International School (JK-12, including International Baccalaureate), First Lutheran Christian Academy (JK-8), and Windsor Adventist Elementary School. The non-denominational Lakeview Montessori School is a private school as well. The Canada South Science City serves the Elementary School Curriculum's Science and Technology component.

Windsor is home to four International Baccalaureate recognized schools: Assumption College School (a Catholic high school), Académie Ste. Cécile International School (a private school), École secondaire E.J. Lajeunesse (a francophone Catholic high school), and Riverside Secondary School (a public high school). Kennedy Collegiate Institute and Vincent Massey Secondary School are renowned in Southern Ontario for their notable accomplishments nationally in mathematics and computer science. Kennedy was built in 1929 in the central part of the city next to Jackson Park. It is sometimes called the castle because of the unique architecture of its gymnasium at the rear of the school.

=== Post-secondary institutions ===
The University of Windsor is Canada's southernmost university. It is a research-oriented, comprehensive university with a student population of 16,000 full-time graduate and undergraduate students. Now entering its most ambitious capital expansion since its founding in 1963, the University of Windsor recently opened the Anthony P. Toldo Health Education & Learning Centre, which houses the Schulich School of Medicine & Dentistry. With the help of $40 million in Ontario government funding, the university also has recently finished construction of a 300,000-square-foot (28,000 m^{2}), $112-million Centre for Engineering Innovation; a structure that establishes revolutionary design standards across Canada and beyond. The university is just east of the Ambassador Bridge, south of the Detroit River.

In Spring 2011, it was announced the University of Windsor would move its music and visual art programs downtown to be housed in the historic Armouries building and former Greyhound Bus Depot at Freedom Way and University Ave E. The move intended to bring an additional 500 students into the downtown core daily. The university also brought its School of Social Work to the old Windsor Star buildings on Ferry and Pitt Streets, bringing an additional 1,000 students into the downtown.

Windsor is also home to St. Clair College that has a student population of 6,500 full-time students. Its main campus is in Windsor, and it also has campuses in Chatham and Wallaceburg. In 2007, St. Clair College opened a satellite campus in downtown Windsor in the former Cleary International Centre. In April 2010, St. Clair College added to its downtown Windsor presence with the addition of its MediaPlex school. Together, they bring over one thousand students into the downtown core daily. The college also opened the TD Student Centre on the corner of Victoria Avenue and University Avenue in 2012.

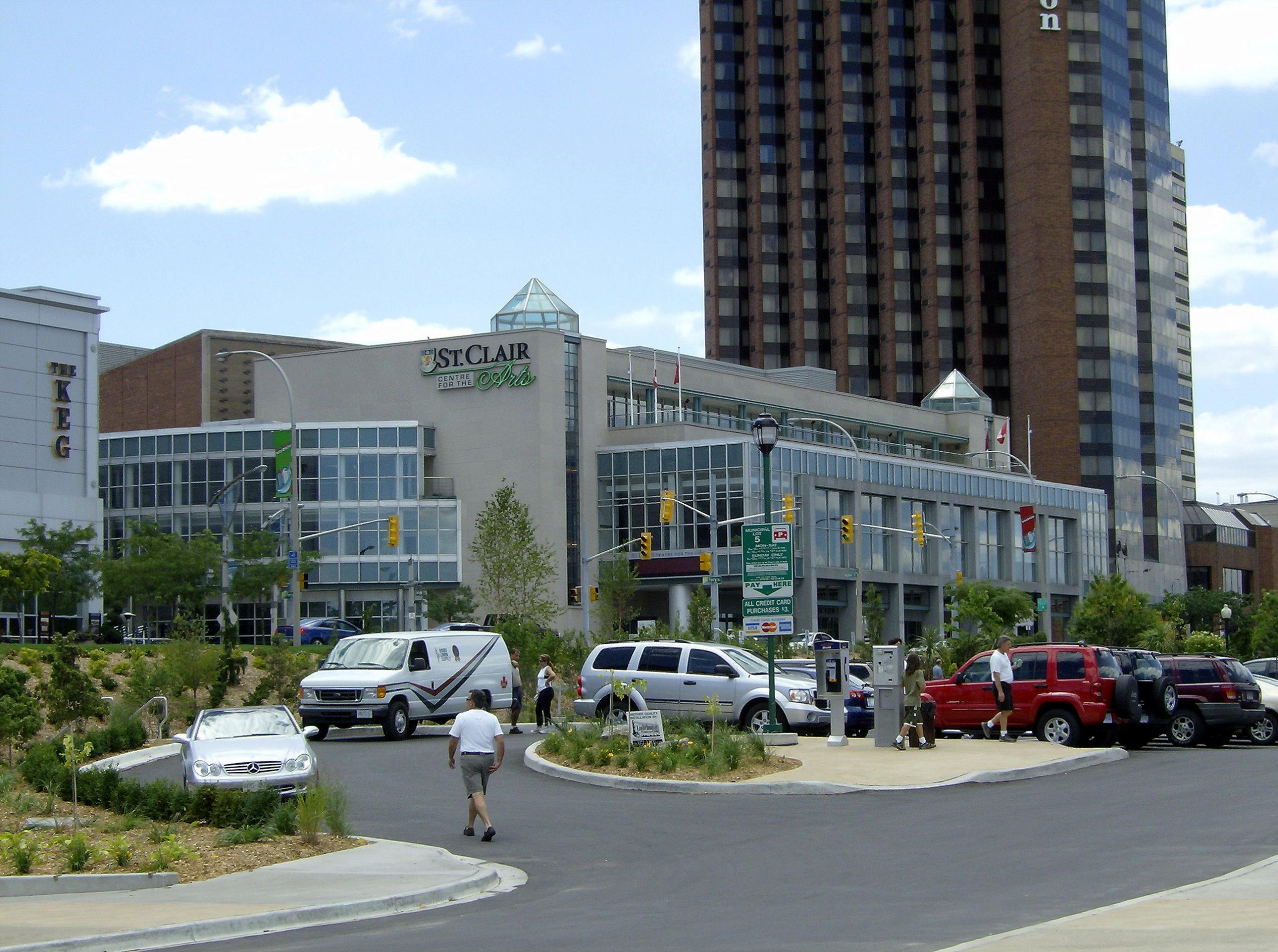
St. Clair College campus on Riverside Drive

More recently, Collège Boréal opened an access centre and small campus to their Ouellette Avenue location. This small campus offers access to many Collège Boréal programmes as well as immigration and integration assistance for francophones in the area. Collège Boréal is Windsor's only francophone post-secondary institution, providing service for a small but notable population of Franco-Ontarians within the Windsor-Tecumseh-Belle River area.

From 1995 to 2001, the city was home to a satellite campus of the defunct francophone Collège des Grands-Lacs.

=== Public libraries ===
The Windsor Public Library offers education, entertainment, and community history materials, programs, and services. The main branch coordinates a literacy program for adults who need functional literacy upgrading. The local historical archives are here.

== Health systems ==
There are two hospitals in Windsor: Hôtel-Dieu Grace Healthcare, formally Hôtel-Dieu Grace Hospital, and Windsor Regional Hospital. Hôtel-Dieu Grace Healthcare is the result of an amalgamation of Grace Hospital and Hôtel-Dieu in 1994. The merger occurred due to the Government of Ontario's province-wide policy to consolidate resources into Local Health Integrated Networks, or LHINs. This was to eliminate duplicate services and allocate resources more efficiently across the region. The policy resulted in the closure of many community-based and historically important hospitals across the province. At this time, Hotel-Dieu Hospital does not do surgeries, nor does it have emergency room services. Its focus has moved away from traditional hospital services and provides more supportive healthcare.

Windsor Regional Hospital has formal and informal agreements with Detroit-area hospitals. For instance, pediatric neurosurgery is no longer performed in Windsor. Leamington District Memorial Hospital in Leamington, Ontario serves much of Essex County and, along with the Windsor institutions, shares resources with the Chatham-Kent Health Alliance.

Over eighteen thousand Windsor residents are employed in the health care profession.

== Transportation ==
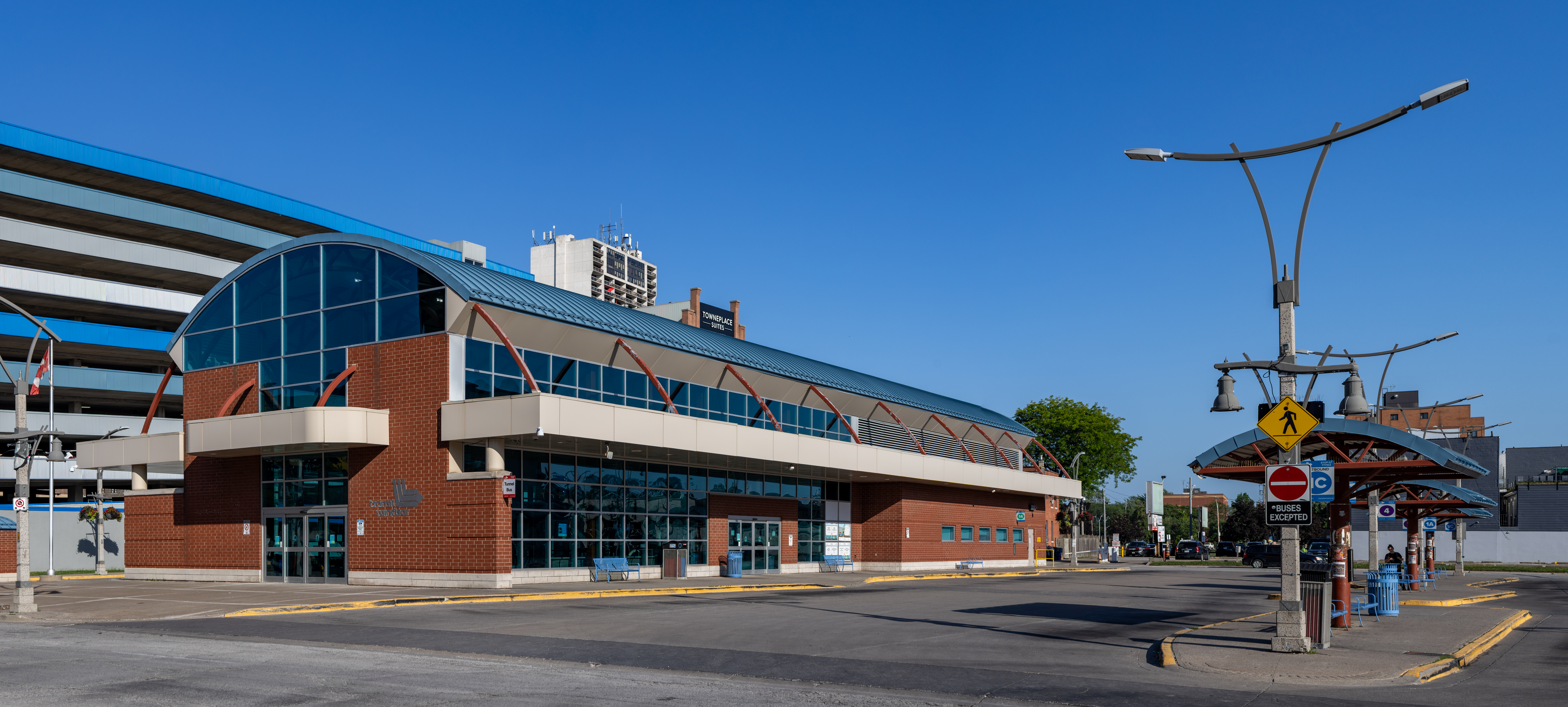
The Windsor International Transit Terminal, opened in 2007

Video of drive-through tunnel from Windsor to Detroit, in year 2010

Windsor is the western terminus of Highway 401, Canada's busiest highway.

Windsor has a municipal highway, E.C. Row Expressway, running east–west through the city. Consisting of 15.7 km (9.8 mi) of highway and nine interchanges, the expressway is the fastest way for commuters to travel across the city. E.C. Row Expressway is mentioned in the Guinness Book of Records as the shortest freeway, which took the longest time to build, as it took more than 15 years to complete. The expressway stretches from Windsor's far west end at Ojibway Parkway east to Banwell Road on the city's border with Tecumseh.

The majority of development in the city of Windsor and the neighbouring town of Tecumseh stretches along the water instead of inland. As a result, there is a lack of major east–west arteries compared to north–south arteries. Only Riverside Drive, Wyandotte Street, Tecumseh Road, County Road 42/Cabana Road and the E.C. Row Expressway serve the almost 30 km (19 mi) from the west end of Windsor eastward. All of these roads, especially the E.C. Row Expressway, are burdened with east–west commuter traffic from the development in the city's east end and suburbs further east. There are eight north–south roads interchanging with the expressway: Huron Church Road, Dominion Boulevard, Dougall Avenue, Howard Avenue, Walker Road, Central Avenue, Jefferson Boulevard, and Lauzon Parkway. Traffic backups on some of these north–south roads at the E.C. Row Expressway are common, mainly at Dominion, Dougall, Howard, and Walker as the land south of the expressway and east of Walker is occupied by Windsor airport and there has been little development.

Windsor's many rail crossings intersect with these north–south thoroughfares. In October 2008, the Province of Ontario completed a grade separation at Walker Road and the CP Rail line. Another grade separation was completed in November 2010 at Howard Avenue and the CP Rail line. In both cases, the road travels under the rail line, and both have below-grade intersections with an east–west street. These were planned as parts of the "Let's Get Windsor-Essex Moving" project funded by the Province of Ontario to improve local transportation infrastructure.

Windsor is connected to Essex and Leamington via Highway 3 and is well connected to the other municipalities and communities throughout Essex County via the county road network. Nearly 20,000 vehicles travel on Highway 3 in Essex County daily. It is the main route to work for many Leamington, Kingsville and Essex residents.

Windsor is linked to the United States by the Ambassador Bridge, the Detroit–Windsor Tunnel, the Gordie Howe International Bridge, a Canadian Pacific Railway tunnel, and the Detroit–Windsor Truck Ferry. In terms of goods volume, the Ambassador Bridge is North America's No. 1 international border crossing: 27% of all trade between Canada and the United States crosses at the Ambassador Bridge.

Windsor has a bike trail network including the (Riverfront Bike Trail, Ganatchio Bike Trail, and Little River Extension). They have become a blend of parkland and transportation, as people use the trails to commute to work or across downtown on their bicycles.

=== Airports ===
The city is served by Windsor International Airport, a regional airport with scheduled commuter air service by Air Canada Express, Porter Airlines, and WestJet, along with heavy general aviation traffic. The majority of destinations are within Ontario except seasonal routes to Calgary, Alberta and a variety of Caribbean destinations.

The Detroit Metropolitan Wayne County Airport is approximately 40 km (25 mi) across the border in Romulus, Michigan and is the airport of choice for many Windsor residents as it has regular flights to a larger variety of destinations than Windsor Airport.

Shuttle buses and cars are within driving distance to larger airports like London International Airport, John C. Munro Hamilton International Airport and to Canada's busiest airport and international hub Toronto Pearson International Airport.

=== Waterways ===
The Port of Windsor, which covers 21.2 km (13.2 mi) of shoreline along the Detroit River, is part of the Great Lakes/Saint Lawrence Seaway System. Accessible to both Lake freighters and ocean-going vessels, the port is the third largest Canadian Great Lakes port in terms of shipments behind only Hamilton and Thunder Bay. Cargos include a wide range of products such as aggregates, salt, grain, fluorspar, lumber, steel, petroleum, vehicles and heavy lift equipment.

=== Transit ===
==== Bus ====
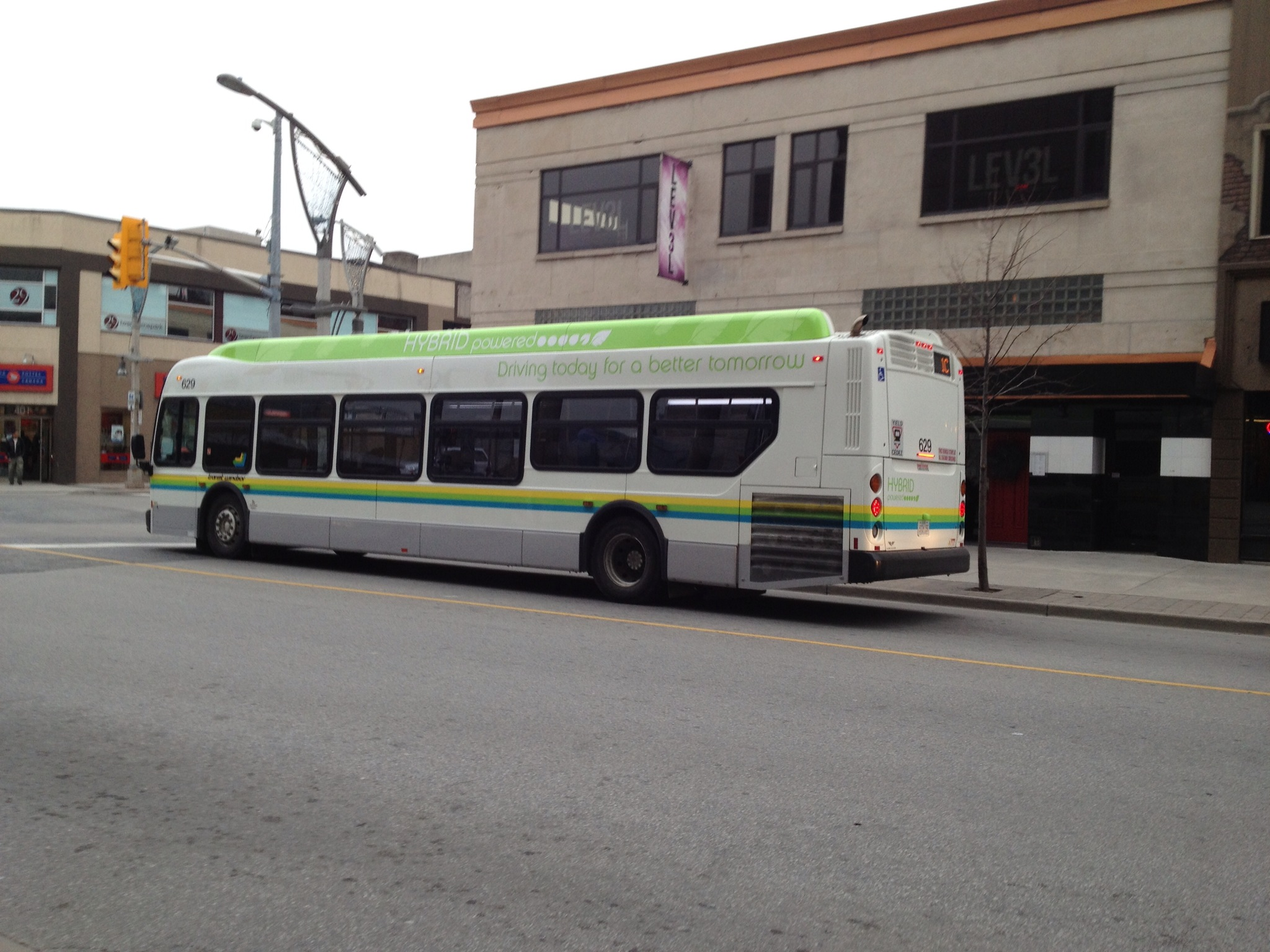
Transit Windsor hybrid 'XCelsior' bus

A public transport bus service is provided by Transit Windsor. The Windsor International Transit Terminal, opened in 2007, is Transit Windsor's hub; intercity buses from Toronto, London, and Detroit also stop here.

==== Rail ====
Windsor has a long history with rail travel in both passenger service and freight due to the Michigan Central Railway Tunnel. The New York Central Railroad's Canadian and Wolverine, as well as Amtrak's Niagara Rainbow, crossed the Detroit River by way of the Railway Tunnel, utilizing the original Windsor Michigan Central Railroad Depot. A second station, the present-day Windsor Station, was completed in 1961. The original station was destroyed by a fire in 1996.

Present-day intercity passenger railway service is provided by Via Rail throughout the region via Windsor Station, as the western terminus of Via Rail's Quebec City–Windsor Corridor. Windsor Station was the nation's seventh-busiest in terms of passenger volumes as of 2012.

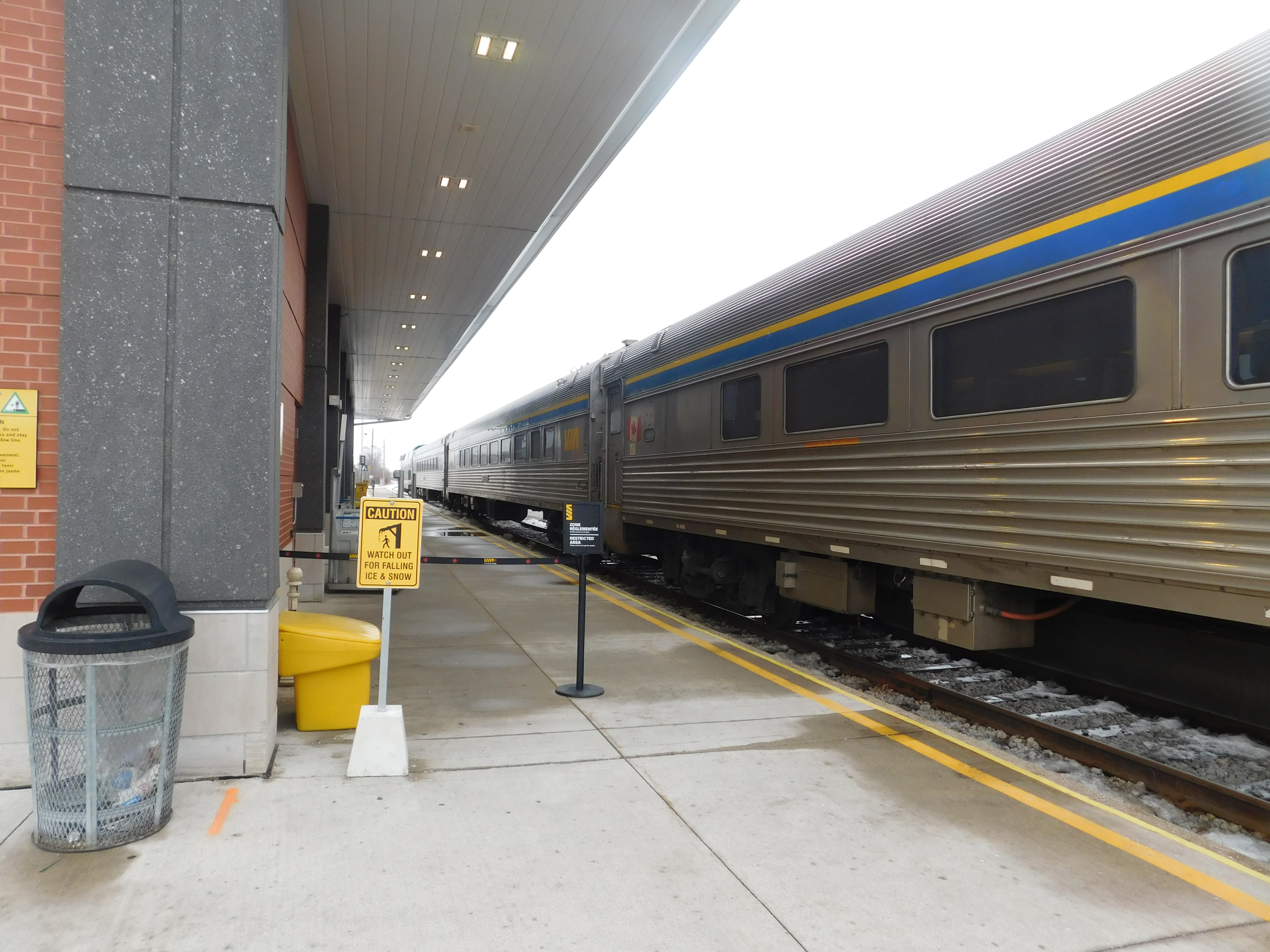
Via Rail train at Windsor station

Since 2019, discussions to restore passenger rail service between Chicago and Toronto have been ongoing. The planned route would extend Amtrak Wolverine service from Chicago through Detroit and Windsor, where passengers would connect with Via Rail service to Toronto. The service remains subject to customs approvals and the construction of border facilities and track infrastructure upgrades.

=== Bridges to Detroit ===
A major and controversial issue is the amount of traffic to and from the Ambassador Bridge. The number of vehicles crossing the bridge has doubled since 1990. However, the total volume of traffic has been declining since the September 11 attacks. The Gordie Howe International Bridge, which opened in July 2026, serves as the largest land ports of entry and one of the busiest commercial border crossings between Canada and the United States that is intended to improve the movement of people and goods between the two countries. This bridge directly connects Highway 401 in Ontario and Interstate 75 in Michigan.

Access to the Ambassador Bridge is via two municipal roads: Huron Church Road and Wyandotte Street. A large portion of the traffic consists of tractor-trailers. There have been, at times, a wall of trucks up to 8 km (5.0 mi) long on Huron Church Road. This road cuts through the city's west end, and the trucks are the source of many complaints about noise, pollution and pedestrian hazards. In 2003, a single mother of three, Jacqueline Bouchard, was struck and killed by a truck at the corner of Huron Church and Girardot Avenue in front of Assumption College Catholic High School, a tragedy argued to be due to a lack of practical safety precautions.

Windsor City Council hired traffic consultant Sam Schwartz to produce a proposal for a solution to this traffic problem. City councillors overwhelmingly endorsed the proposal and it was presented to the federal government as a "Made in Windsor" solution. Not all of the surrounding residents supported the plan. One problem with the plan is the proposed road would cut through protected green spaces such as the Ojibway Prairie Reserve.

In 2005, the Detroit River International Crossing (DRIC—a joint Canadian-American committee studying the options for expanding the border crossing) announced its preferred option was to extend Highway 401 directly westward to a new bridge spanning the Detroit River and interchange with Interstate 75 somewhere between the existing Ambassador Bridge span and Wyandotte.

On April 9, 2010, the City of Windsor, along with local cabinet ministers Dwight Duncan and Sandra Pupatello of the Province of Ontario, announced a final decision had been made in the plans to construct the Windsor-Essex Parkway, the new Highway 401 extension leading to a future crossing. The announcement indicated the project would be the most expensive road ever built in Canada on a per kilometre basis. It included commitments to enhance green space design through the use of berming, landscaping, and other aesthetic treatments. As part of negotiations with the City of Windsor (who threatened legal action in pursuit of more tunnelling and green space of the route), the province agreed to additional funding to infrastructure projects in Windsor-Essex; this includes money for the improvement of the plaza of the Canadian side of the Windsor-Detroit tunnel, the widening and other improvements of Walker Rd between Division Rd and E.C. Row Expressway, and the environmental assessment and preliminary design of a future extension of Lauzon Parkway to Highway 401.

== Twin towns – sister cities ==
Windsor has several sister cities:

Changchun, China (1992); (United Kingdom) Coventry, UK (1963); Fujisawa, Japan (1987); Granby, Quebec, Canada (1956); Gunsan, South Korea (2005); Lublin, Poland (2000)	Mannheim, Germany (1980); Las Vueltas, El Salvador (1987); Ohrid, North Macedonia (1981); Saint-Étienne, France (1963); Saltillo, Mexico (1994); Udine, Italy (1975)

== Sports ==
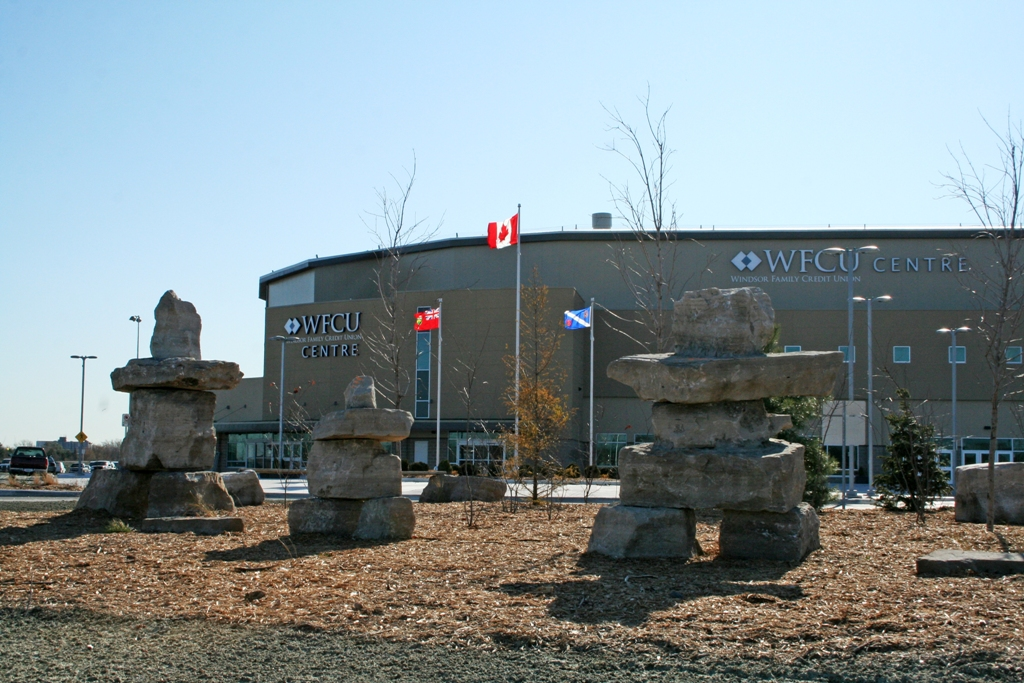
The WFCU Centre is the current home of the Windsor Spitfires and the Windsor Express.

Windsor's sports fans tend to support the major professional sports league teams in either Detroit or Toronto. Still, the city itself is home to two professional teams, the Windsor Express of the Basketball Super League and the Windsor Spitfires of the Ontario Hockey League. The Express was an expansion team of the National Basketball League (NBL) that began play in the 2012–13 season, with home games played at the WFCU Centre. On April 17, 2014, the Express won their first championship of NBL-Canada against the Island Storm in the 7th game of their final series, 121–106. Windsor is also home for the following youth, minor league and post-secondary teams

Team	Sport	League	Founded	Main venue
Windsor Spitfires	Hockey	OHL	1971	WFCU Centre
Windsor Express	Basketball	BSL	2012	WFCU Centre
Windsor Clippers	Lacrosse	OLA Junior "B"	2003	Forest Glade Arena
Windsor Rouges	Rugby	ORU	1963	AKO Park
Windsor City FC	Soccer	L1O Premier	2004	St. Clair College
St. Clair Saints (Football)	Football	CJFL	1929	St. Clair College
St. Clair Saints	Multi	CCAA	1967	St. Clair College
Windsor Lancers	Multi	U Sports	1952	UW Stadium

Windsor is also home to youth soccer teams like Windsor FC Nationals and other leagues like the Windsor Roller Derby league.

=== Former teams ===
- Windsor Bulldogs (OHA Senior A Hockey League) 1953–1964, won 1963 Allan Cup
- Windsor St. Clair Saints (Major League Hockey Senior "AAA"/CCAA)
- Windsor Royals/Bulldogs (Western Ontario Hockey League) now known as LaSalle Vipers
- Windsor Bulldogs (Canadian Professional Hockey League) 1920s and 1930s
- Windsor Hornets (Canadian Professional Hockey League) 1920s
- Windsor Gotfredsons (International Hockey League) 1940s
- Windsor Spitfires (International Hockey League) 1940s
- Windsor Rockets/Royals (Ontario Rugby Football Union) 1940s and 1950s
- Windsor Warlocks (Major Series Lacrosse) 2004
- Windsor Clippers (OLA Senior B Lacrosse League) 1960s
- Windsor Warlocks (OLA Junior A Lacrosse League) 1970s
- Windsor Warlocks (OLA Junior B Lacrosse League) 1980s
- Windsor Mariners (Ontario Australian Football League) 2000s
- Windsor and District Soccer League

=== Canadian Premier League ===
On January 10, 2022, it was announced Windsor would be the home of a new Canadian Premier League team. The announcement saw the league's first commissioner, David Clanachan, step down from his position to focus on bringing a professional soccer team to his hometown.

=== International sporting events ===
- Windsor hosted rounds of the Red Bull Air Race World Championship in 2009 and 2010 (Detroit hosted the race in 2008). The races took place on a course of pylons set up on the Detroit River, right over the border between Canada and the United States.
- The 2016 FINA World Swimming Championships (25 m) "Short Course Worlds" took place in Windsor.
- The city has served as a venue during various editions of the FINA Diving World Series.
- Windsor hosted World Junior Baseball Championship in 1986, 1987 and 1993.

== See also ==
- 1946 Windsor–Tecumseh, Ontario tornado
- Detroit–Windsor
- Dominion House
- Flag of Windsor, Ontario
- Super Outbreak
