= Baby (disambiguation) =

A baby, or infant, is the very young offspring of human beings. Or, by extension, it can refer to a young animal.

Baby or Babys may also refer to:

== Aircraft ==
- Avro Baby, a British single-seat light sporting biplane
- Sopwith Baby, a seaplane used by the British Royal Naval Air Service from 1915
- Supermarine Baby, a British flying boat fighter aircraft of the First World War
- Wight Baby, a British seaplane fighter which first flew in 1916

== Arts and entertainment ==
=== Characters ===
- Baby (Dragon Ball), in the anime Dragon Ball GT
- Baby, in the Super Monkey Ball series of video games
- Circus Baby, in the Five Nights at Freddy's series of video games
- Scrap Baby, a broken-down version of Circus Baby from Freddy Fazbear's Pizzeria Simulator
- Baby, in the 2017 film Baby Driver, played by Ansel Elgort
- Frances "Baby" Houseman, in the 1987 film Dirty Dancing, played by actress Jennifer Grey
- Baby Sinclair, in the television sitcom Dinosaurs
- Baby, a fictional character and one of the protagonists in the animated show Kuu Kuu Harajuku

=== Films ===
- Baby (1915 film), an American silent comedy starring Oliver Hardy
- Baby, a 1932 German film starring Anny Ondra
- Baby: Secret of the Lost Legend, a 1985 American film directed by Bill L. Norton
- Baby (2000 film), an American television film featuring Alison Pill
- Baby (2002 film), a German drama
- Baby (2007 film), an American independent film starring David Huynh
- Baby (2010 film), a British short film
- Baby (2015 Tamil film), a horror film
- Baby (2015 Hindi film), an Indian action spy thriller starring Akshay Kumar
- Baby (2016 film), an Indian Odia film
- Baby (2020 film), a Spanish psychological thriller
- Baby (2023 film), an Indian romantic drama
- Baby (2024 film), a Brazilian drama

=== Literature ===
- Baby (MacLachlan novel), 1995, by Patricia MacLachlan
- Baby (Thorup novel), 1973, by Kirsten Thorup

=== Music ===
==== Labels ====
- Baby Records (disambiguation), multiple record labels

==== Musicians ====
- Baby (band), a 1970s American southern rock band from Texas
- The Babys, a 1970s British rock group
- Baby (rapper), American rapper Bryan Christopher Williams (born 1969), also known as Birdman
- DaBaby, American rapper (born 1991)
- Lil Baby, American rapper (born 1994)

==== Albums ====
- Baby (The Burning Hell album), 2009
- Baby (The Detroit Cobras album), 2005
- Baby (Dijon album) or the title song, 2025
- Baby (White Hinterland album) or the title song, 2014
- Baby (Yello album), 1991
- Baby, by Bosque Brown, 2009
- The Babys (album), by the Babys, 1977

==== Songs ====
- "Baby" (Aitch and Ashanti song), 2022
- "Baby" (Angie Stone song), 2007
- "Baby" (Anton Powers and Pixie Lott song), 2017
- "Baby" (Ashanti song), 2002
- "Baby" (Aya Nakamura song), 2023
- "Baby" (Brandy song), 1994
- "Baby" (Charli XCX song), 2022
- "Baby" (Clean Bandit song), 2018
- "Baby" (Fabolous song), 2005
- "Baby" (Justin Bieber song), 2010
- "Baby" (LL Cool J song), 2008
- "Baby" (Lloyd Cole song), 1996
- "Baby" (Madame song), 2020
- "Baby" (Pnau song), 2008
- "Baby" (Quality Control, Lil Baby and DaBaby song), 2019
- "Baby" (Royal Republic song), 2016
- "Baby" (Sfera Ebbasta song), 2020
- "Baby" (Summer Walker and Chris Brown song), 2025
- "Baby" (Wilma Burgess song), 1965
- "Baby" (Yoasobi song), 2026
- "B-A-B-Y", by Carla Thomas, 1966
- "Baby: Drive Me Crazy", by Chantay Savage, 1996
- "Baby", by Alcazar from Disco Defenders, 2009
- "Baby", by Bakermat, 2017
- "Baby", by Bang Chan from SKZ-Replay 2026 Pt.1, 2026
- "Baby", by Beach House from B-Sides and Rarities, 2017
- "Baby", by the Bird and the Bee from Ray Guns Are Not Just the Future, 2009
- "Baby", by Bishop Briggs, 2018
- "Baby", by Brittany Howard from Jaime, 2019
- "Baby", by Caetano Veloso and Gal Costa from Tropicalia: ou Panis et Circenses, 1968
- "Baby", by Celine Dion from Courage, 2019
- "Baby", by Danny Brown from Stardust, 2025
- "Baby", by Eminem from The Marshall Mathers LP 2, 2013
- "Baby", by Exo from XOXO, 2013
- "Baby", by Gotye from Boardface, 2003
- "Baby", by Iggy Pop from The Idiot, 1977
- "Baby", by Joker Bra (Capital Bra) and Vize, 2020
- "Baby", by Karol G from Ocean, 2019
- "Baby", by Kylie Minogue, a B-side of "Love at First Sight", 2001
- "Baby", by Logic from Supermarket, 2019
- "Baby", by Madison Beer from Life Support, 2021
- "Baby", by Martha Wainwright from Martha Wainwright, 2005
- "Baby", by Melody Club from Face the Music, 2004
- "Baby", by Nicki Nicole from Parte de Mí, 2021
- "Baby", by Prince from For You, 1978
- "Baby", by Relient K from Forget and Not Slow Down, 2009
- "Baby", by Ridsa, 2014
- "Baby", by Rufus Wainwright from Rufus Wainwright, 1998
- "Baby", by Sage the Gemini, 2021
- "Baby", by Santhosh Narayanan from Jigarthanda film soundtrack, 2014
- "Baby", by Serj Tankian from Elect the Dead, 2007
- "Baby", by Summer Walker from Last Day of Summer, 2018
- "Baby", by Tenacious D from The Pick of Destiny, 2006

=== Television ===
==== Series ====
- Baby (Italian TV series), a 2018–2020 teen drama streaming series
- Baby (Pakistani TV series), a 2017 drama series

==== Episodes ====
- "Baby" (Dawson's Creek), 1998
- "Baby" (The Dumping Ground), 2013
- "Baby: Part 1" (Malcolm in the Middle), 2003
- "Baby: Part 2" (Malcolm in the Middle), 2003
- "Baby" (Not Going Out), 2007
- "Baby" (Supernatural), 2015

=== Other arts and entertainment ===
- Baby (musical), 1983, by David Shire and Richard Maltby, Jr.

== People ==
- Baby (nickname), a list of people
- Baby (surname), a list of people
- Baby Halder (born 1973), Indian writer
- Baby Huwae (1939–1989), Indonesian actress and singer
- Baby John (disambiguation)
- Baby Spice, Emma Bunton (born 1976), from Spice Girls
- Baby (director), A. G. Baby (fl. 1973–1991), Indian film director
- Baby (rapper) or Birdman, Bryan Williams (born 1969), American rapper
- Baby, Shannon McNeill, performer with the World Championship Wrestling dance team the Nitro Girls

== Places ==
- Baby, Gmina Odolanów in Greater Poland Voivodeship, west-central Poland
- Baby, Gmina Ostrów Wielkopolski in Greater Poland Voivodeship, west-central Poland
- Baby, Kutno County in Łódź Voivodeship, central Poland
- Baby, Masovian Voivodeship, east-central Poland
- Baby, Piotrków County in Łódź Voivodeship, central Poland
- Baby, Pomeranian Voivodeship
- Baby, Seine-et-Marne, a commune of the Seine-et-Marne département, France
- Baby, Silesian Voivodeship, south Poland

== Other uses ==
- "Baby", a term of endearment
- "Baby", a term of insult for infantilization
- Baby cell or C battery, a common size of battery
- Manchester Baby, the first electronic stored-program computer
- Baby! 1, an early portable microcomputer
- Babys (mythology), a character in Greek mythology

== See also ==
- Baby, Baby (disambiguation)
- Baby Alice, a Swedish Eurodance group
- Babe (disambiguation)
- Babes (disambiguation)
- Babies (disambiguation)
- The Baby (disambiguation)
- Babyhood (disambiguation)
- Child (disambiguation)
