= Babes =

Babes may refer to:

== Arts and entertainment ==
- Babes (band), an American indie pop band
- Babes (album), an album by Wavves
- "Babes", a song from the album The Inner Me by Lala Hsu
- Babes (TV series), an American sitcom (1990–1991)
- Babes (website), a pornographic website
- Babes (film), a 2024 American film

== People ==
- Babes Wodumo (born 1994), South African singer and choreographer
- Mohamed Seghir Babes (1943–2017), Algerian politician

== Sports teams ==
- Osun Babes F.C., a football club based in Osogbo, Osun State, Nigeria
- Springfield Babes, an American soccer club (1926–1927)

== See also ==
- Babeș (disambiguation)
- Babes in Toyland (disambiguation)
- Babes in the Wood (disambiguation)
- Babe (disambiguation)
- Babies (disambiguation)
