= Babe =

Babe may refer to:

- Babe, a term of endearment
- A newborn baby
- An attractive (especially female) person

== People ==
- Babe (nickname), a list of people
- Jerome Babe (1837–1893), American inventor and miner
- Thomas Babe (1941–2000), American playwright
- Oliver Hardy (1892–1957), American comic actor sometimes billed as "Babe Hardy" early in his career
- Babe the Farmer's Daughter, a ring name of professional wrestler and businessperson Ursula Hayden (1966-2022)

== Places ==
- Babe (Bragança), a civil parish in the municipality of Bragança, Portugal
- Babe (Sopot), a village in Serbia

== Arts and entertainment ==
=== Fictional characters ===
- Babe the Blue Ox, companion of the mythical lumberjack Paul Bunyan
- Babe, the titular protagonist of Dick King-Smith's novel The Sheep-Pig
- Babe Carano, from Game Shakers
- Babe Carey, a character in the American soap opera All My Children

=== Films ===
- Babe (film), a 1995 English-language film about a pig who learns to herd sheep
- The Babe, a 1992 film starring John Goodman as baseball player Babe Ruth

=== Music ===
==== Groups ====
- Babe (Dutch band), a girl-pop band
- Babe (Serbian band), a rock band
- BaBe, a Japanese pop duo

==== Songs ====
- "Babe" (Styx song), from the 1979 album Cornerstone
- "Babe" (Take That song), from the 1993 album Everything Changes
- "Babe" (Hyuna song), from the 2017 EP Following
- "Babe" (Sugarland song), from the 2018 album Bigger
- "Babe", by Emeli Sandé from the album Long Live the Angels

=== Other uses in arts and entertainment ===
- Babe (comics), a comic book by artist/writer John Byrne

== Other uses ==
- Tropical Storm Babe (disambiguation), one Atlantic Ocean and six Pacific Ocean cyclones
- Bristol Babe, a single-seat biplane produced after the First World War
- B.a.B.e., a women's rights organization in Croatia
- Babe, a fragrance sold by Fabergé
- A promotional model at video game conventions or comic book conventions

== See also ==
- Baby (disambiguation)
- Bebe (disambiguation)
- Babes (disambiguation)
