= Babies (disambiguation) =

Babies are very young offspring.

Babies may also refer to:

- Babies (Černý), a series of sculptures by Czech artist David Černý
- Babies (2010 film), a French documentary film by Thomas Balmès
- Babies (upcoming film), an upcoming comedy film by Lauren Miller Rogen
- Babies (American TV series), a 2020 American documentary web television series
- Babies (British TV series), a British television drama series
- "Babies" (song), a 1992 song by British rock group Pulp
- "Babies", a song by Kyle from the 2018 album Light of Mine
- "I Wanna Have Your Babies" or "Babies", a 2007 song by Natasha Bedingfield
- The Babies, an American rock band
  - The Babies (album), 2011

== See also ==
- Babys (mythology), a figure in Greek mythology
- The Babys, a British rock band
  - The Babys (album), their 1976 debut album
- Baby (disambiguation)
- Babes (disambiguation)
