= Childhood (disambiguation) =

Childhood is the age span ranging between birth and puberty.

Childhood may also refer to:

== Literature ==
- Childhood (Tolstoy novel), an 1852 novel by Leo Tolstoy
- Childhood (Alexis novel), a 1998 novel by André Alexis
- Childhood (journal), an academic journal in the field of childhood studies

== Music ==
- Childhood (band), an English rock band
- Childhood (album), a 1981 album by Sylvia Chang, or the title song
- "Childhood" (Michael Jackson song), 1995
- "Childhood" (Tetsuya Takeda song), 1985
- "Childhood", a song by Lo Ta-yu
- "Childhood", a song by Beach House, from their self-titled album
- "Childhood", a song by Blink-182, from their 2023 album One More Time...
- "Childhood", a song by The Chameleons from their 1986 album Strange Times

== Film and television ==
- A Childhood, a 2015 French film
- "Childhood" (Robin Hood), an episode of the BBC television series Robin Hood
- "Childhood" (Stewart Lee's Comedy Vehicle), a 2016 TV episode
- Childhoods (film), a 2007 French film

== See also ==
- Babyhood (disambiguation)
- Boyhood (disambiguation)
- Child (disambiguation)
- Girlhood (disambiguation)
