= First Steps =

An individual's first steps are a stage in learning to walk. These first steps may be regarded as an emotionally significant event in a child's development across many cultures.

First Steps may also refer to:

== Art ==
- First Steps (1890), a painting by Vincent van Gogh
- First Steps (painting) (1893), a painting by Georgios Jakobides

== Film and television ==
- First Steps (1947 film), a documentary film
- First Steps (1985 film), a CBS television film
- The Fantastic Four: First Steps, a 2025 film from Marvel Studios

=== Television episodes ===
- "First Steps", All Saints season 5, episode 24 (2004)
- "First Steps", Babies episode 6 (2020)
- "First Steps", M.A.N.T.I.S. episode 1 (1994)
- "First Steps", NCIS season 19, episode 14 (2022)
- "First Steps", The Human Body episode 3 (1998)
- "First Steps", The Spectacular Spider-Man season 2, episode 5 (2009)

== Music ==
- "First Steps", a song by Mike Oldfield on the 2005 album Light + Shade
- "First Steps" (song), a song by Elbow, BBC theme song for the 2012 Olympics
- "First Steps", a song by Lena Raine from the soundtrack of the 2018 video game Celeste

== See also ==
- First Step (disambiguation)
