= Baby Baby Baby =

Baby, Baby, Baby, or variants, may refer to:

- Baby, Baby, Baby (Mindy Carson album), 1959
- Baby, Baby, Baby (Jimmy Witherspoon album), 1963
- "Baby, Baby, Baby" (Teresa Brewer song), 1953
- "Baby Baby Baby" (Joss Stone song), 2007
- "Baby, Baby, Baby," song by Sam Cooke, 1963
- "Baby-Baby-Baby", song by TLC, 1992
- "Baby Baby Baby", song by Aretha Franklin on the 1967 album I Never Loved a Man the Way I Love You
- "Baby Baby Baby", song by Endeverafter on the 2007 album Kiss or Kill

== See also ==
- "Baby, Baby, Baby, Baby, Baby...", a song from R. Kelly's 1995 eponymous album
- Baby (disambiguation)
- Baby, Baby (disambiguation)
