= The First Step =

The First Step may refer to:

== Music ==
- The First Step (Faces album), or First Step, 1971
- Four releases by Treasure:
  - The First Step: Chapter One, single album, 2020
  - The First Step: Chapter Two, single album, 2020
  - The First Step: Chapter Three, single album, 2020
  - The First Step: Treasure Effect, studio album, 2021
- "The First Step" (song), by Tracy Byrd, 1994

== Television ==
- "The First Step", Australia's Next Top Model season 6, episode 1 (2010)
- "The First Step" (Doctors), a 2002 episode
- "The First Step", Exosquad season 2, episode 11 (1994)
- "The First Step", Me, Myself & I episode 2 (2017)
- "The First Step", Raffles episode 1 (1977)
- "The First Step", RWBY: Volume 1 episode 4 (2013)
- "The First Step, Part 2", RWBY: Volume 1 episode 5 (2013)
- "The First Step", Samvidhaan episode 1 (2014)
- "The First Step", The Flying Doctors series 3, episode 12 (1988)

== Other uses ==
- The First Step (essay), an 1891 essay by Leo Tolstoy
- The First Step (film), a 2021 American documentary film

== See also ==
- First Step (disambiguation)
