= First Step =

First Step may refer to:

- First Step (CNBLUE album), 2011
- First Step (Faces album), 1970
- First Step, Hakui Koyori album, 2025
- First Step (Mount Everest), the first of the Three Steps, prominent rocky steps on the northeast ridge of Mount Everest
- RSS First Step, a Blue Origin space capsule for the New Shepard launch vehicle
- The first of the Twelve Steps in a twelve-step addiction recovery program

== See also ==
- First Step Act, a U.S. law
- The First Step (disambiguation)
- First Steps (disambiguation)
