= Baby Baby =

Baby Baby may refer to:

== Music ==
- "Baby Baby" (Amy Grant song)
- "Baby Baby" (Corona song)
- "Baby Baby" (Girls' Generation song)
- "Baby Baby" (Ratcat song)
- "Baby Baby" (The Vibrators song)
- "Baby, Baby" (Xtreme song)
- "Baby, Baby (I Know You're a Lady)", a song by David Houston
- "Baby, Baby", a song by Nicole & Hugo, Belgium's entry in the 1973 Eurovision Song Contest
- "Baby, Baby", a song by Eighth Wonder
- "Baby, Baby", a song by take
- Baby Baby Please, an R&B song by Timothy Wilson

== Others ==
- Baby Baby (doll), a DeFilippo doll produced by Ideal Toy Company

== See also ==
- Baby Baby Baby (disambiguation)
- Baby (disambiguation)
