= Girlhood =

Girlhood is the state of a being a girl.

Girlhood may also refer to:

- Feminity, a set of attributes, behaviors, and roles typically associated with girls and women
- Girlhood (film), a 2014 French film by Céline Sciamma
- Girlhood (album), a 2017 album by The Preatures

== See also ==
- Boyhood (disambiguation)
- Childhood (disambiguation)
- Girl (disambiguation)
