= Baby John (disambiguation) =

Baby John may refer to:

- Baby John (1917–2008), an Indian socialist politician
- Shibu Baby John (born 1963), an Indian politician, son of Baby John
- Kerala Revolutionary Socialist Party (Baby John), a political party in Kerala, India, founded by Baby John and currently led by Shibu
- Baby John (film), a 2024 Indian film directed by Kalees and starring Varun Dhawan
  - Baby John (soundtrack), its soundtrack by Thaman S

== See also ==
- John (disambiguation)
- John Baby, a Canadian ice hockey player
