= Toyland =

Toyland may refer to:

- Toyland (film), a 2007 German short film
- "Toyland" (comics), a 1948 Donald Duck comic book short story written and drawn by Carl Barks
- Toyland, an amusement park in Clifton Beach, Karachi.
- "Toyland", a song from the 1903 operetta Babes in Toyland
- The world of the Noddy books, created by Enid Blyton
- Toyland, a toy area from the defunct Canadian chain Zellers
- Land of Toys or Toyland (original name: Paese dei balocchi), a fictional location in the Italian novel The Adventures of Pinocchio (1881-1883) by Carlo Collodi and several adaptations of the story in other media

== See also ==
- Babes in Toyland (disambiguation)
