= Boyhood =

Boyhood refers to the state of being a boy.

Boyhood may also refer to:

- Masculinity, a set of attributes, behaviors, and roles typically associated with boys and men
- Boyhood (novel), an 1854 novel by Leo Tolstoy
- Boyhood (1951 film), a film by Keisuke Kinoshita
- Boyhood: Scenes from Provincial Life, a 1997 book by J. M. Coetzee
- Boyhood (2014 film), a film by Richard Linklater
- Boyhood (TV series), a 2023 South Korean web series

== See also ==
- Boy (disambiguation)
- Childhood (disambiguation)
- Girlhood (disambiguation)
