= Babyhood (disambiguation) =

Babyhood is the state of being an infant.

Babyhood may also refer to:

- Babyhood (Paul Reiser book), 1996 comedic autobiographical memoir
- Babyhood, 1974 popular science book by Penelope Leach
- Babyhood: Rhymes and Stories, Pictures and Silhouettes for Our Little Ones, 1878 children's book by Laura E. Richards
- Babyhood, 1923 magazine founded by De Lysle Ferree Cass
- Baby Bonnie Hood, also known as "B.B. Hood", character from the Darkstalkers videogame series

== See also ==
- Childhood (disambiguation)
- Baby (disambiguation)
