= The Baby =

The Baby may refer to:

- "The Baby" (song), 2002 single by Blake Shelton
- The Baby (film), 1973 American psychological thriller film directed by Ted Post
- The Baby (TV series), 2022 British horror comedy limited series
- The Baby (album), 2020 album by Samia
- "The Baby" (Dynasty), 1982 American television episode
- "The Baby" (Plebs), 2014 British television episode

== See also ==
- The Babys, 1970s British band
- The Babies, American band
- DaBaby, American rapper (born 1991)
- Baby (disambiguation)
