= Jerome Babe =

American diamond miner and inventor (1837–1893)

- Born: Jerome Lewellyn Babe; February 4, 1837; Cincinnati, Ohio, U.S.
- Died: April 8, 1893; Philadelphia, Pennsylvania, U.S.
- Occupation: Engineer
- Spouse: Elanora Ray Babe
- Engineering career
- Discipline: Mining engineering
- Significant design: "Yankee Baby" mineral screen

Jerome Lewellyn Babe (February 4, 1837 – April 8, 1893) was an American diamond miner and inventor.

== Biography ==
Babe, an American, arrived in the Cape Colony (modern-day South Africa) circa 1865 as a sales representative for the Winchester Repeating Arms Company and also as a special correspondent for the New York World. He arrived in Colesberg, Cape Colony on June 12, 1870 and by July 4 was at Jacobsdal, Orange Free State. At Jacobsdal he demonstrated the 1866 .44 Henry Winchester rifle's quick firing by shooting 16 rounds in ten seconds, resulting in a large number of sales.

Once he completed his work for Winchester and the newspaper, Babe found that he had several months before his scheduled return journey. He decided to enter into diamond mining, having previously had experience prospecting in California. This was soon after the first discovery of diamonds in the region. Babe was unimpressed with the technique that was then in use on the diamond fields, of excavating a quantity of gravel and then removing it to the nearest water source, often some distance away, for washing and screening. He devised a type of dry sorting pan that could sort diamonds from the gravel without the use of water. This machine was first used at the Vaal River field in 1871 and became known as the "Yankee Baby" or simply the "Baby" after Babe's surname. The machine became very popular and was still in use in the region in 1966. The "Baby" functioned as a swinging sieve (underneath a coarser sieve which separates out the larger pebbles), which allows medium-sized pebbles (which may contain diamonds) to roll into a tub. The contents of the tub are gravitated, and the heavier stones are placed on a sorting table to allow the diamonds to be hand-picked out.

Sales of the Baby, income from excavating diamonds, sales of diamonds purchased from other miners, and profits from "grubstakes" (whereby he earned a cut of profits from miners to whom Babe provided capital, materials or provisions) made Babe a fortune. In 1872, he was in the eastern United States where he published a book titled The South African Diamond Fields. This work was mentioned in a discussion on potential rivals by Mark Twain in a letter to journalist John Henry Riley.

Babe was robbed of $10,000 worth of diamonds from a stagecoach in York, Pennsylvania in July 1872. After returning to the Cape, his ventures became unprofitable and, after losing his money, he returned to America in 1873. Babe was married to Elanora Ray Babe, who died on May 28, 1893, less than two months after him.
