= Babe (Sopot) =

Babe Бабе
- Village
- Location within Serbia
- Coordinates: 44°31′N 20°31′E
- Country: Serbia
- District: Belgrade District
- Municipality: Sopot

Population (2022)
  - Total: ▼307
- Time zone: UTC+1 (CET)
  - Summer (DST): UTC+2 (CEST)

Babe (Serbian Cyrillic: Бабе) is a village in the municipality of Sopot, suburban municipality of Belgrade, Serbia. According to the 2022 census, the village has a population of 307 people.

== Mining ==
In the early 2000, a new sports complex "Babe" was built. In July 2000, during the excavations for complex, a spring was discovered in the valley of the Pruten creek. The new Pruten spring has a capacity up to 40 L/s (1.4 cu ft/s) and by 2011 a waterworks was constructed which supplies the villages of Babe, Stojnik and Ropočevo, so as the complex itself, with the water from this spring. Moreover, during the excavation, a hidden entry into the vast complex of Roman mines was discovered, too, being obscured for centuries. There are evidence of the extraction of silver, iron and lead. In the 3rd century AD, the Kosmaj mines were one of the most important in the Roman Empire, and were administered by the Roman procurator Babenius, whose name is preserved in the name of the Babe village.

In the 1970s and 1980s, experts from the National Museum in Belgrade explored the area and discovered many mining necropolises, centered around the villages of Babe, Stojnik and Guberevac. It is estimated that there are some 100 ancient mining shafts on Kosmaj, which go 2 km (1.2 mi) below the ground and are 25 km (16 mi) wide. After the Roman period, mining activities ceased, only being revived in the Medieval Serbia.

In February 2022, it was announced that the Serbia Zijin Bor Copper company has been exploring the mountain for possible mining. Because of the bad image of the company regarding pollution, this caused public outrage, especially due to the ongoing ecological protests. Zijin immediately pulled off, stating they are stopping the surveys as they only inherited the 2012 survey rights and partial permits due to the purchase and ownership changes in some other companies. The government confirmed that on Zijin's official request, a survey ceasing decision was issued. The explored area was the Babe-Ljuta Strana survey field, spreading in three municipalities (Barajevo, Sopot and Voždovac), and surveyed ores included lead, zinc, copper, silver and gold.

== Characteristics ==
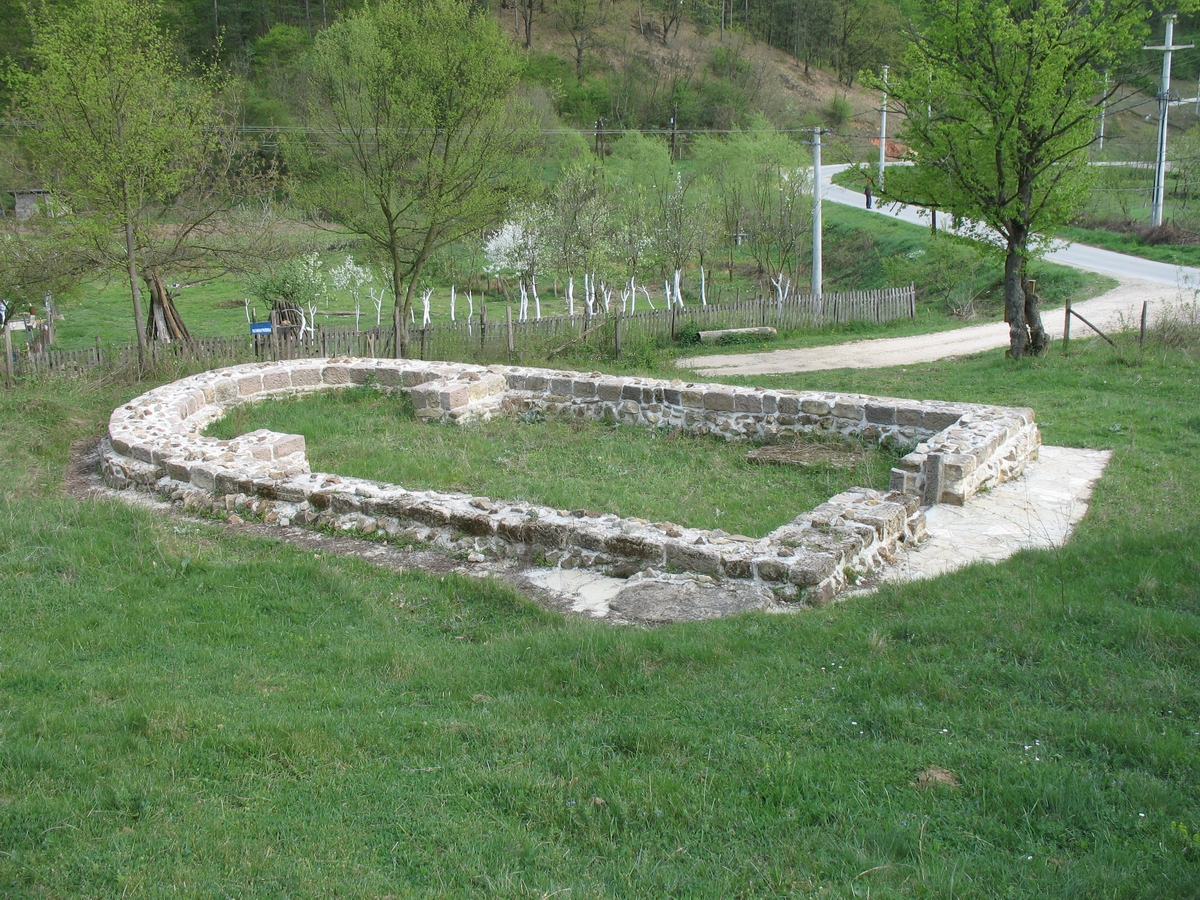
Foundations of the old church, before the new one was built

In the 15th century, during the reign of Despot Stefan Lazarević, there was a church in the village, built by the local nobleman. The church was subsequently razed to the ground and after being left to the elements for centuries, the remains were reduced to rubble and the memory of the once existing church was erased. During the 2002 survey of the region by the experts from the Institute for the protection of the cultural monuments the foundations were discovered. In 2005 construction of the new church on the old foundations began. The stone building was finished in 2018. The churchyard has two gates and a drinking fountain. There are plans for a small konak in the yard for the nuns, as the plan is to turn the church into the female monastery.

The elementary school in Babe was opened in 1897, in a private house. The separate school building was built in 1901. By the 21st century, due to the depopulation, the school became combined, with all pupils going to one class. When they complete the IV grade, they continue in the "Cana Marjanović" school in Ralja, as the school in Babe is administratively a department of the Ralja school. With only five pupils in 2022, the school in Babe is one of the smallest schools in Belgrade.
