= Baby (band) =

Baby was an American southern rock band from Texas that formed in 1970.

== Recording history ==
The band's 1974 self-titled album Baby got the attention of the executives at Mercury Records based on their regional album sales in Texas. The album was remixed and re-released in mid-1975 on Mercury and thereby derived a national distribution network. The follow-up album was called Where Did All The Money Go? which got released on Chelsea Records in 1976.
