= Mohamed Seghir Babes =

Algerian politician

Mohamed Seghir Babes (March 10, 1943–March 7, 2017 in Algiers) was the Algerian minister for health and population in the 1992 government of Belaid Abdessalam.
