= Babeș =

Babeș may refer to:

- Babeș River
- Vincențiu Babeș (1821–1907), Romanian lawyer, teacher, journalist and politician
- Victor Babeș (1854–1926), Romanian physician, son of Vincențiu
  - Babeș-Bolyai University
  - Victor Babeș University of Medicine and Pharmacy, Timișoara
  - Babesia
  - Babesia divergens
  - Babesiidae
  - Babesiosis
- Aurel Babeș (1886–1961), Romanian scientist, nephew of Victor
- Liviu Cornel Babeș (1942–1989), Romanian protester
