= Childhood (journal) =

Peer-reviewed academic journal

- Discipline: Childhood studies
- Language: English
- Edited by: Tatek Abebe, Sarada Balagopalan, Karl Hanson, Spyros Spyrou

Publication details
- History: 1993-present
- Publisher: SAGE Publishing in association with the Department of Education and Lifelong Learning (Norwegian University of Science and Technology)
- Frequency: Quarterly
- Impact factor: 1.6 (2023)

Standard abbreviations
- ISO 4: Childhood

Indexing
- ISSN: 0907-5682
- LCCN: 94645087
- OCLC no.: 41963991

Links
- Journal homepage; Online access; Online archive; Journal page at Norwegian University of Science and Technology website

Childhood. A journal of global child research, is a quarterly peer-reviewed academic journal covering research in the field of childhood studies. It was established in 1993 and is published by SAGE Publishing in association with the Department of Education and Lifelong Learning (Norwegian University of Science and Technology). The editors-in-chief are Tatek Abebe (Norwegian University of Science and Technology), Sarada Balagopalan (Rutgers University), Karl Hanson (University of Geneva), and Spyros Spyrou (European University Cyprus).

== Abstracting and indexing ==
The journal is abstracted and indexed in Current Contents, British Humanities Index, Scopus, and the Social Sciences Citation Index. According to the Journal Citation Reports, the journal has a 2023 impact factor of 1.6.
