= Baby! 1 =

1976 briefcase computer

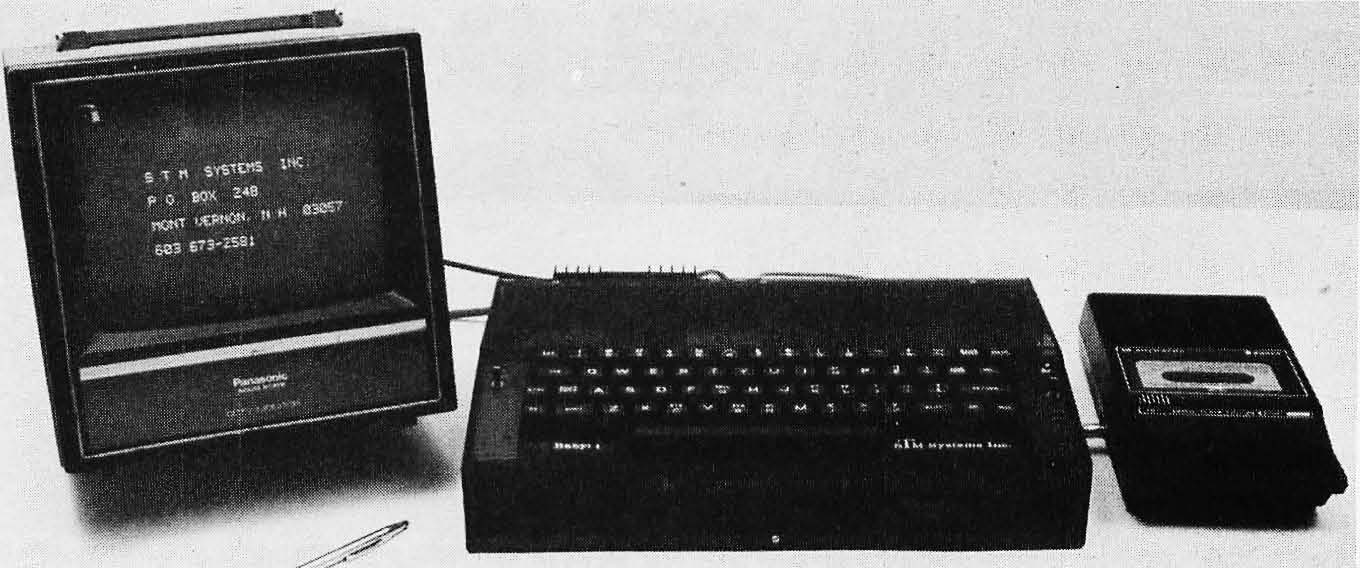
- Developer: STM Systems Inc.
- Manufacturer: STM Systems Inc.
- Type: Microcomputer (transportable)
- Released: 1976; 50 years ago
- Operating system: Tiny BASIC
- CPU: MOS Technology 6502
- Memory: 2–4 KB RAM
- Removable storage: Cassette tape
- Display: Monochrome TV, 32 x 16 characters
- Graphics: Character generator

The Baby! 1 is a transportable microcomputer released by STM Systems Inc. of Mont Vernon, New Hampshire, in late 1976. The computer was based on the MOS Technology 6502 microprocessor and came in a small enclosure that fit inside an attaché briefcase that came shipped with the computer. Byte magazine in 1985 called it the first portable microcomputer, although it more closely resembled the home computers of the 1980s such as the Commodore 64 than early laptops like the Grid Compass.

== Development and specifications ==
The Baby! 1 was announced in August 1976 by start-up company STM Systems Inc. of Mont Vernon, New Hampshire. A single-board computer, the Baby! 1 is based on the MOS Technology 6502 microprocessor and features between 2 KB to 4 KB of RAM and a machine code monitor on ROM. The computer's acrylic case houses the mainboard, keyboard, and power supply unit and measures 14.5 by 10 by 4.5 inches (37 by 25 by 11 cm) while weighing approximately 10 pounds. Its built-in keyboard features 62 full-sized keys. The Baby! 1 came shipped in an attaché briefcase for carrying the computer. The computer's power supply feeds the Baby! 1 5 volts and up to 3 amps DC, rectified from a fully regulated 110 volt AC input. The computer was sold fully assembled, with no kit version available.

A 1200-baud cassette interface chip is included on board to allow audiocasettes to be used as data storage with the use of an external portable cassette deck, sold separately. The computer's character generator chip meanwhile is capable of displaying the uppercase and lowercase Latin alphabet, the uppercase and lowercase Greek alphabet, numbers, and various symbols. Each character is composed of a 7 by 9 pixel grid; the video chip is capable of displaying 512 total characters on screen, as 16 lines of 32 characters. While the computer was initially not sold with a monitor, a portable 9-inch black-and-white CRT television manufactured by Panasonic was later included as a top-of-the-line option.

An external 5.25-inch floppy disk drive unit for the Baby! 1 was announced at the Atlantic City Personal Computing expo of 1976 but discontinued on account of cost. It was to retail for $350, STM apparently taking a $40 loss from the average price of a 5.25-inch floppy drive, though it may have been intended to be a loss leader to encourage more sales of the Baby! 1. The Baby! 1 itself sold for $850 to $1000 in August 1976, depending on if the customer purchased the 2-KB or 4-KB variant. STM promised the same drive again in November 1976, but development was pushed all the way back to July 1977, and it was probably never released. The drive would have been a Shugart model.

Included operating systems and programs for the computer were Tiny BASIC and TECO.

== Legacy ==
Byte magazine called the computer "an excellent teaching system for software concepts in secondary schools and colleges, and looks like an excellent system for personal use". Indeed, the computer was used in at least one elementary school. T. D. Towers, in his International Microprocessor Selector book, classified the Baby! 1 as a microprocessor trainer platform and as a software development system.

In 1985, Byte called the Baby! 1 the first portable microcomputer. Although they acknowledged the IBM 5100 from 1975 before it, they referred to the latter as the "first briefcase-sized computer". Former Byte journalist Michael Nadeau said that it had more in common with the home computers of the 1980s such as the Commodore 64, than early laptops like the Grid Compass. Regardless, he called the Baby! 1 "unusually small and light" for the time and deemed it a "significant system" that "push[ed] the size envelope".
