= List of RWBY episodes =

RWBY is an American web series created by Monty Oum and produced by Rooster Teeth Productions. RWBY premiered on July 18, 2013, on the Rooster Teeth website. Episodes were later uploaded to YouTube and streaming websites such as Crunchyroll. As of March 2024, 117 episodes, spanning nine volumes, have been released. Volume 9 premiered on February 18, 2023, and concluded on April 22, 2023.

== Series overview ==
Season	Episodes	Originally released	
Season	Episodes	First released	Last released
1	16	July 18, 2013	November 7, 2013
2	12	July 24, 2014	October 30, 2014
3	12	October 24, 2015	February 13, 2016
4	12	October 22, 2016	February 4, 2017
5	14	October 14, 2017	January 20, 2018
6	13	October 27, 2018	January 26, 2019
7	13	November 2, 2019	February 1, 2020
8	14	November 7, 2020	March 27, 2021
9	11	February 18, 2023	March 30, 2024

== Episodes ==
=== Volume 1 (2013) ===
Trailer for Volume 1 of RWBY

Volume 1 was released between July 18 and November 7, 2013. Chapters premiered to the public Thursdays at 7 pm Central Standard Time (UTC-6) on the Rooster Teeth website and were released two hours early for "sponsors". They were uploaded to YouTube a week later. Crunchyroll announced on August 16, 2013, that RWBY would be simulcast on the video streaming site.

The DVD/Blu-ray release of Volume 1 has 10 episodes, resulting from combining the "Part 2" episodes with their respective first parts.

Before the premiere of Volume 1, four trailers were released: the "Red", "White", "Black", and "Yellow", each focusing on one of the series' main protagonists.

No. overall	No. in volume	Title	Directed by	Written by	Release date
P1	0	"Red Trailer"	Monty Oum	Monty Oum	November 7, 2012
After visiting the gravestone of her mother, Ruby Rose encounters a pack of Grimm which she swiftly decimates.
P2	0	"White Trailer"	Monty Oum	Monty Oum	February 14, 2013
Weiss Schnee performs a song in a concert hall while her first successful fight against a Grimm is also shown.
P3	0	"Black Trailer"	Monty Oum	Monty Oum	March 22, 2013
Blake Belladonna and Adam Taurus invade a Schnee Dust Company train, and destroy the security robots. Blake leaves Adam behind, after discovering his ruthless behavior.
P4	0	"Yellow Trailer"	Monty Oum	Monty Oum	June 1, 2013
At a night club, Yang Xiao Long interrogates the club owner Junior about the whereabouts of a woman. Junior attacks her with his henchmen, but Yang defeats them all.
1	1	"Ruby Rose"	Monty Oum; Kerry Shawcross	Miles Luna; Kerry Shawcross	July 18, 2013
A mysterious narrator explains the origins of mankind in Remnant and warns that the darkness will eventually return and that there will be no victory in strength. A man then responds that victory can lie in simpler things, requiring a smaller and more honest soul. Ruby Rose stops a robbery at a Dust shop, and during a fight with Roman Torchwick, she is saved by Glynda Goodwitch. She introduces her to the headmaster of Beacon Academy, Professor Ozpin. He allows her to enroll in Beacon Academy, despite her age.
2	2	"The Shining Beacon"	Monty Oum; Kerry Shawcross	Miles Luna; Kerry Shawcross	July 25, 2013
Ruby is reluctant to make new friends, but her half-sister Yang Xiao Long encourages her to. Ruby meets Weiss Schnee, who berates her. While she accuses her for being too young to attend Beacon, Blake Belladonna arrives at the scene. After leaving, Ruby meets Jaune Arc. The two walk around campus, before realizing they are lost.
3	3	"The Shining Beacon, Part 2"	Monty Oum; Kerry Shawcross	Miles Luna; Monty Oum; Kerry Shawcross	August 1, 2013
Ruby and Jaune manage to locate the training arena, and Ruby tries to make amends with Weiss. Ozpin gives a speech to the students, leaving Ruby and Yang concerned. Later, Yang drags Ruby to try and talk to Blake. Blake is initially dismissive, but Ruby manages to form a connection with her. Yang starts an argument with Weiss, but it is cut off when Blake blows out the candles.
4	4	"The First Step"	Monty Oum; Kerry Shawcross	Miles Luna; Monty Oum; Kerry Shawcross	August 8, 2013
Ruby wants to be partnered with Yang, but she does not want that since she wants her to break out of her shell. Meanwhile, Weiss attempts to create a partnership with Pyrrha Nikos. Ozpin announces that the first person they make eye contact with, after they land in the Emerald Forest will be their partner for the next four years. Their objective is to find a Relic in a temple. The students are then catapulted into the forest.
5	5	"The First Step, Part 2"	Monty Oum; Kerry Shawcross	Miles Luna; Monty Oum; Kerry Shawcross	August 15, 2013
After arriving, Ruby attempts to find Yang, but ends up making eye contact with Weiss. Weiss attempts to leave, but returns to Ruby when the next person she sees is Jaune. However, Pyrrha arrives and wishes to be partners with him. Ruby tries to form a friendship with Weiss, by showing off her speed to convince Weiss that she is capable, but she unknowingly leaves her alone with Grimm nearby.
6	6	"The Emerald Forest"	Monty Oum; Kerry Shawcross	Miles Luna; Monty Oum; Kerry Shawcross	August 22, 2013
Blake and Yang become partners. Meanwhile, Weiss fights back, but she gets interrupted when Ruby rushes in. The two argue for working together. Pyrrha teaches Jaune about Aura which is the manifestation of one's soul that is predominantly used as a shield. Lie Ren and Nora Valkyrie are partnered together.
7	7	"The Emerald Forest, Part 2"	Monty Oum; Kerry Shawcross	Miles Luna; Monty Oum; Kerry Shawcross	August 29, 2013
As the initiation continues, Ruby and Weiss argue, while staying in the forest. Meanwhile, Blake and Yang have found the temple holding the Relics. Jaune accidentally angers a Death Stalker, after mistaking it for the Relic, and it chases him and Pyrrha. Yang hears Jaune's scream and tries to get Blake's attention, but Blake gets distracted at the sight of Ruby falling from the sky.
8	8	"Players and Pieces"	Monty Oum; Kerry Shawcross	Miles Luna; Monty Oum; Kerry Shawcross	September 5, 2013
The students all arrive at the temple. Ruby, still wanting to prove herself, decides to take on the Death Stalker by herself but cannot hurt it. Weiss saves Ruby and decide to work together. Everyone tries to flee, but they end up in a battle with the Nevermore and Death Stalker. Ruby, Weiss, Blake, and Yang, work together to defeat the Nevermore, while Jaune, Nora, Pyrrha, and Ren battle the Death Stalker. Back at Beacon, Ozpin forms the new teams, including Team CRDL, Team JNPR (with Jaune as the leader) and Team RWBY (with Ruby as the leader), much to Weiss's dismay.
9	9	"The Badge and The Burden"	Monty Oum; Kerry Shawcross	Miles Luna; Monty Oum; Kerry Shawcross	September 12, 2013
The day after the initiation, Team RWBY decorate their room and attend their first classes. Weiss becomes infuriated when she sees Ruby goofing around during Professor Port's lecture, feeling that she is not serious about being a Huntress. When Port asks the class to fight a Boarbatusk for them, Weiss volunteers.
10	10	"The Badge and The Burden, Part 2"	Monty Oum; Kerry Shawcross	Miles Luna; Monty Oum; Kerry Shawcross	September 19, 2013
Weiss defeats the Boarbatusk, encouraged by Ruby. After class, the two argue over Ruby's qualifications as a leader. They seek advice from their teachers: Ozpin advises Ruby to be responsible, while Port tells Weiss to be humbler. Later that night, Weiss returns to their dorm room and finds Ruby asleep, surrounded by books. When Weiss wakes her up, she gives Ruby a coffee, and remarks that she thinks Ruby has the potential to be a good leader, but that she is going to be the best teammate she ever had.
11	11	"Jaunedice"	Monty Oum; Kerry Shawcross	Miles Luna; Monty Oum; Kerry Shawcross	September 26, 2013
Jaune and Cardin are sparring, with Jaune getting outmatched. Goodwitch tells Jaune that he needs to listen to his Aura levels and that the Vytal Festival, where rival schools compete in a tournament, is coming up. At lunch, Cardin and the rest of his team torment Velvet Scarlatina, a rabbit Faunus. As Jaune leaves the table, Cardin stares him down.
12	12	"Jaunedice, Part 2"	Monty Oum; Kerry Shawcross	Miles Luna; Monty Oum; Kerry Shawcross	October 3, 2013
Professor Oobleck gives a lecture on the Faunus War. He asks Jaune a question, but Jaune gets the answer wrong. Oobleck asks Cardin the same question, but Pyrrha criticizes his answer, humiliating Cardin. After class, Pyrrha decides to help Jaune improve in both combat and academics. However, Jaune admits to Pyrrha that he enrolled in Beacon Academy using fake transcripts. Pyrrha offers to help, but Jaune snaps at her. When Pyrrha walks away, Cardin reveals that he heard everything and promises to keep his secret as long as Jaune does whatever he says.
13	13	"Forever Fall"	Monty Oum; Kerry Shawcross	Miles Luna; Monty Oum; Kerry Shawcross	October 10, 2013
During the class' field trip to Forever Fall Forest, Cardin tricks Jaune into doing the team's assignment and having revenge on Pyrrha for retaliating against him in class. Having had enough, Jaune stands up to him.
14	14	"Forever Fall, Part 2"	Monty Oum; Kerry Shawcross	Miles Luna; Monty Oum; Kerry Shawcross	October 17, 2013
While beating up Jaune, Team CRDL is attacked by an Ursa, who becomes attracted to their negativity and the sap they were collecting. Jaune helps Cardin by defeating the Ursa, secretly aided by Pyrrha's Semblance, and tells him to leave him. Jaune makes amends with Pyrrha.
15	15	"The Stray"	Monty Oum; Kerry Shawcross	Miles Luna; Monty Oum; Kerry Shawcross	October 31, 2013
As they prepare for the Vytal Festival Tournament, Team RWBY meets a strange girl named Penny Polendina and a monkey Faunus named Sun Wukong. Weiss and Blake get into a heated argument over the Faunus, and the White Fang after Weiss makes some derogatory remarks. Blake inadvertently reveals she not only is a Faunus, but also has a connection to the White Fang. She runs away in fear of rejection and takes off her bow, revealing that she is a cat Faunus.
16	16	"Black and White"	Monty Oum; Kerry Shawcross	Miles Luna; Monty Oum; Kerry Shawcross	November 7, 2013
Blake reveals her past as a former White Fang member to Sun, and they discover that the White Fang work for Torchwick during a stakeout. Ruby and Penny arrive and defeat the White Fang, as Torchwick escapes. After the fight, Weiss and Blake make amends. Penny leaves the kingdom undetected. Ozpin receives a text message from Qrow about the impending danger. In a post-credits scene, Torchwick visits Cinder Fall and two of her associates.

=== Volume 2 (2014) ===
Trailer for Volume 2 of RWBY

Volume 2 premiered on July 24, 2014, following an exclusive screening of Chapter 1 at RTX on July 4, 2014. The weekly release date and time for new chapters were the same as for Volume 1. The volume concluded on October 30, 2014.

No. overall	No. in volume	Title	Directed by	Written by	Original release date
17	1	"Best Day Ever"	Monty Oum; Kerry Shawcross	Miles Luna; Monty Oum; Kerry Shawcross	July 24, 2014
Emerald and Mercury, Cinder's associates, kill Tukson for leaving the White Fang. Meanwhile, Sun prepares to introduce his teammate Neptune to Team RWBY. In the dining hall, Nora starts a large-scale food fight between Teams RWBY and JNPR, which Ruby wins for her team. When Emerald and Mercury return to Torchwick's hideout, he argues with them, but is interrupted by Cinder. Torchwick questions what exactly Cinder's plans are, but she dismisses it and claims they are moving onto the second phase.
18	2	"Welcome to Beacon"	Monty Oum; Kerry Shawcross	Miles Luna; Monty Oum; Kerry Shawcross	July 31, 2014
James Ironwood, head of the Atlas military and Academy, arrives at Beacon with several military airships in tow, which Ozpin fears they will alarm the citizens. Blake remembers the events that occurred at the docks and the conversation she had with Ozpin. She begins to open up to her teammates, concerned about the enemies and that they will not wait for Team RWBY to be ready. Ruby decides that they should investigate for any leads on possible future attacks. At the same time, Cinder, Emerald, and Mercury have infiltrated Beacon as students.
19	3	"A Minor Hiccup"	Monty Oum; Kerry Shawcross	Miles Luna; Monty Oum; Kerry Shawcross	August 7, 2014
To find clues about the enemy, Ruby and Weiss are assigned to investigate the Schnee Dust Company files for robberies, Blake and Sun are about to attend a White Fang meeting, and Yang and Neptune are questioning Junior for the information. Ruby spots Penny, but she pretends that she does not know Ruby. Ruby sees Penny again and they come across a showcase of the new Atlesian Paladin. Some soldiers spot Penny and start to chase her, Ruby tries to help Penny with her Semblance, but collapses in the middle of the street. Penny saves Ruby from getting hit by a truck with her hands, revealing that she is a robot.
20	4	"Painting the Town..."	Monty Oum; Kerry Shawcross	Miles Luna; Monty Oum; Kerry Shawcross	August 14, 2014
Penny reveals herself to be the first synthetic person capable of generating an Aura, and Ruby accepts this and promises to keep it a secret. Yang and Neptune try to interrogate Junior, but he cannot provide any useful information. Meanwhile, Blake and Sun discover that Torchwick is at the White Fang rally, encouraging the Faunus to work with him. He unveils a stolen Paladin from Atlas and uses it to pursue Blake and Sun after recognizing them. Blake calls for backup as the Paladin chases them on a highway. Using team attacks, Team RWBY destroys the Paladin, but Torchwick escapes with his assistant, Neopolitan.
21	5	"Extracurricular"	Monty Oum; Kerry Shawcross	Miles Luna; Monty Oum; Kerry Shawcross	August 28, 2014
During class, Mercury participates to fight Pyrrha, but forfeits the match. Team RWBY compiles information from their investigation and deduces that the White Fang is carrying out their activities in Vale's southeast territory. In between this, the students are preparing for the Vytal Tournament Festival Ball, but Blake is focused on their mission and Weiss rejects the invitation. Jaune claims to Pyrrha that someone like her would misunderstand the rejection and that he would wear a dress if she cannot find a date to the dance. In the dorms, Mercury reveals he used the practice match to analyze Pyrrha's fighting abilities, and Cinder decides to include her as a pawn in her plan.
22	6	"Burning the Candle"	Monty Oum; Kerry Shawcross	Miles Luna; Monty Oum; Kerry Shawcross	September 4, 2014
Blake exhausts herself in her research for Torchwick and the White Fang, worrying her teammates. Yang confronts Blake about her obsession by opening up about how she lost her mother. Yang reveals that this is the second person she lost with the first being her birth mother who had left after she was born. This caused Yang to become obsessed with searching for her birth mother which nearly caused her and Ruby to be killed during a dangerous journey looking for her. She admits that she is still looking for her, but is not letting it take over her life. Yang asks Blake not to do it for herself, but for the people she cares about. Blake finally heeds Yang's advice and attends the tournament ball.
23	7	"Dance Dance Infiltration"	Monty Oum; Kerry Shawcross	Miles Luna; Monty Oum; Kerry Shawcross	September 11, 2014
At the dance, Jaune finds Pyrrha out on the balcony, who reveals that she came by herself because people often perceive her as "too good" for them. She explains why she likes Jaune because he just sees her for who she is. Jaune keeps his promise to Pyrrha and shows up wearing a dress. During the dance, Cinder makes her way to the CCT, where she uploads a virus. Ruby notices someone outside on the roof and begins to pursue them, not knowing that it is Cinder. However, the battle between the two is cut short when Ironwood arrives, allowing Cinder to escape and return to the dance. The hacked computer screen now displays a black queen chess piece.
24	8	"Field Trip"	Monty Oum; Kerry Shawcross	Miles Luna; Monty Oum; Kerry Shawcross	September 25, 2014
Ruby is questioned about the intruder in Ozpin's office and links them to Torchwick and the White Fang. However, Ozpin questions that link which causes Ruby to mention that their base is in the southeast. Yang attempts to cheer Ruby up, by showing her a package they received from home which contains their pet dog, Zwei. Afterwards, the first-year students gather for their first mission: shadowing a professional Huntsmen or Huntress on an assignment. Team RWBY volunteers for an assignment southeast that is off-limits for first years, but Ozpin allows them to accept it. Outside, Team RWBY discovers that the Huntsman they are shadowing is Professor Oobleck, much to their dismay.
25	9	"Search and Destroy"	Monty Oum; Kerry Shawcross	Miles Luna; Monty Oum; Kerry Shawcross	October 2, 2014
While travelling to their destination, Oobleck talks about Mountain Glenn, which was meant to be an expansion for the city but was overrun by the Grimm. Once they land, it is revealed that Ruby secretly brought Zwei along. Soon waves of Beowolfs appear which leads to Team RWBY to fight them. Oobleck questions everyone, but Ruby on why they chose to become Huntresses. Back at the camp, the rest of team are upset with their answers as they are still unaware on why they want to be Huntresses.
26	10	"Mountain Glenn"	Monty Oum; Kerry Shawcross	Miles Luna; Monty Oum; Kerry Shawcross	October 9, 2014
Back at camp, Yang asks Weiss and Blake what their true motivation are. Zwei leaves the building and Ruby follows him, where she accidentally discovers some of the White Fang. Ruby attempts to return to camp to warn the others, but the pavement beneath her collapses causing her to fall without Crescent Rose and Zwei. Ruby is captured by soldiers and is brought to Torchwick. The others are soon alerted about her disappearance, and Oobleck realizes that the hideout is actually underground.
27	11	"No Brakes"	Monty Oum; Kerry Shawcross	Miles Luna; Monty Oum; Kerry Shawcross	October 23, 2014
Ruby's teammates and Oobleck rescue her, but Torchwick's train begins to take off to the city, using bombs to destroy the cave and allowing the Grimm to follow them. The team splits up with Ruby, Oobleck and Zwei fight on the roof of the train, while Weiss, Blake, and Yang enter the train. They meet three opponents the first being Neopolitan whom Yang fights, the second is a White Fang Lieutenant whom Weiss fights, and finally Torchwick who fights Blake. Yang is overwhelmed by Neo, but is rescued by mysterious woman. Weiss is nearly defeated by the White Fang Lieutenant, but Blake defeats Torchwick. Ruby regroups with her team, but they are too late and the train crashes into the last barrier. As the team comes to dazed, they realize that a multitude of Grimm have emerged from the wreck.
28	12	"Breach"	Monty Oum; Kerry Shawcross	Miles Luna; Monty Oum; Kerry Shawcross	October 30, 2014
Jaune wakes up by a call from Ruby, but the call drops before Ruby can respond. Back in the city, Team RWBY are fighting hordes of Grimm, but are slowly becoming overwhelmed. Some of the students and professors arrive, and help Team RWBY defeat the Grimm and arrest Torchwick. Ozpin meets with Beacon's Council, where they decide to appoint Ironwood as head of security for the festival. Cinder, Emerald and Mercury stand on the roof, overlooking the destruction in Vale, and Cinder remarks her victory. Mercury questions if the White Fang will listen to them now. However, Adam Taurus arrives and claims that they will listen to him. In a post-credits scene, Yang identifies the mysterious woman as her birth mother, Raven.

=== Volume 3 (2015–16) ===
Trailer for Volume 3 of RWBY

Volume 3 was confirmed at the Rooster Teeth panel at PAX Prime 2014, where creator and director Monty Oum stated that he planned to go into development of the next Volume right after he was done with Volume 2. The release of Volume 3 was postponed because of Oum's sudden passing in early 2015. Weeks later, producer Gray Haddock announced that the series would continue, with Volume 3 premiering in 2015. Chapter 1 was released for "sponsors" only on October 24, 2015, followed by the release on YouTube the following day. Starting with Volume 3, the release day for new Chapters was changed from Thursday to Saturday, with a new release time of 10 am CST. Before the release of Chapter 7, Gray Haddock announced that from this point on, RWBY would be incorporating darker and more mature elements to the story. He advised those responsible "for a very young viewer" to watch the episodes before deciding if they want to show them to a child. Volume 3 concluded on February 13, 2016. This was the last volume in which Oum was credited as a writer.

No. overall	No. in volume	Title	Directed by	Written by	Original release date
29	1	"Round One"	Kerry Shawcross; Gray Haddock; Miles Luna	Miles Luna; Monty Oum; Kerry Shawcross	October 24, 2015
Ruby visits her mother's grave and recounts her time at Beacon. Back at Vale, the Vytal Festival has started, and Team RWBY is up against Team ABRN of Haven Academy in Mistral. The tournament is being spectated by thousands of people and it is being broadcast throughout Remnant. Team RWBY wins the match and afterwards they go the fairgrounds, where they discover Emerald participating in the tournament. Weiss receives a phone call from her father, which she declines, and when she attempts to pay for everyone's meal, her card is declined much to her surprise.
30	2	"New Challengers..."	Kerry Shawcross; Gray Haddock; Miles Luna	Miles Luna; Monty Oum; Kerry Shawcross	October 31, 2015
Team JNPR fight against Shade's Team BRNZ and defeat them after a rocky start. Later, Team SSSN of Haven, Sun and Neptune's team, against Shade's all-female Team NDGO. Despite Neptune's fear of water, Team NDGO is defeated as well. Meanwhile, Qrow has been watching the matches and is disappointed by both teams. He sees an airship passing by and comments that this was the fight that he was waiting for. Weiss sees the ship and remarks that "she is here".
31	3	"It's Brawl in the Family"	Kerry Shawcross; Gray Haddock; Miles Luna	Miles Luna; Monty Oum; Kerry Shawcross	November 14, 2015
Weiss is excited about seeing her stern older sister Winter, arriving at Beacon. Qrow provokes Winter into a fight, which is later stopped by Ozpin and Ironwood. In private, Qrow reports that Cinder has infiltrated Beacon, and attacked Amber, the current Fall Maiden. Ozpin decides that it is time they find their next "Guardian". Meanwhile, Cinder hacks into Ironwood's scroll, and has Mercury and Emerald fighting Team CFVY's Coco and Yatsuhashi.
32	4	"Lessons Learned"	Kerry Shawcross; Gray Haddock; Miles Luna	Miles Luna; Monty Oum; Kerry Shawcross	November 28, 2015
Emerald and Mercury defeat Coco and Yatsuhashi, after separating the two of them and using an illusion. Later, Weiss and Winter talk about how Weiss cannot use her summoning. Back at Beacon, Ruby and Yang are telling Qrow about what happened with Torchwick. Winter reveals to Weiss that she has two choices. She could either continue to rely on their father for money and support or she could make her own path. In the end, when Weiss and Winter part ways, a small sword is manifested, before dissolving and Weiss chooses to reject a call from her father.
33	5	"Never Miss a Beat"	Kerry Shawcross; Gray Haddock; Miles Luna	Miles Luna; Monty Oum; Kerry Shawcross	December 5, 2015
Penny and Ciel Soleil win their doubles fight against Team CRDL. Later, Weiss and Yang are up against Flynt Coal and Neon Katt from Atlas' Team FNKI. Yang defeats both opponents, after Weiss sacrifices herself, gaining their respect. In the dorms, Cinder discovers Penny's structural designs among the data stolen from Ironwood's scroll. Meanwhile, Qrow and Ozpin decide to nominate Pyrrha as a candidate for their "Guardian."
34	6	"Fall"	Kerry Shawcross; Gray Haddock; Miles Luna	Miles Luna; Monty Oum; Kerry Shawcross	December 12, 2015
Pyrrha is faced with the decision to accept the Fall Maiden's Aura and powers, a process that could fail or make her lose her identity. Meanwhile, the Vytal Festival Tournament proceeds to its singles match, with Yang and Mercury fighting in the first round. Yang wins, but Emerald uses her Semblance of Hallucinations to trick her into attacking a defenseless Mercury. The audience becomes angry, and the Grimm outside Vale stir from the negative emotions.
35	7	"Beginning of the End"	Kerry Shawcross; Gray Haddock; Miles Luna	Miles Luna; Monty Oum; Kerry Shawcross	January 2, 2016
In a series of flashbacks, Cinder recruits Emerald and Mercury. Later, they ambush the Fall Maiden, Amber, using Emerald's Semblance to lure her in. Qrow intervenes, but Cinder successfully steals half of her powers. With her new abilities, Cinder coerces the White Fang to join her. In the present, Emerald, Cinder and Neo fly Mercury out of Amity Colosseum, revealing that Mercury was never injured from Yang's attack, due to his prosthetic legs. It is reported on the news that the public is angered by Yang's attack, with most of them blaming Beacon and Ozpin. The negative reaction has caused waves of Grimm in Vale that the Atlas Military struggle to contain.
36	8	"Destiny"	Kerry Shawcross; Gray Haddock; Miles Luna	Miles Luna; Monty Oum; Kerry Shawcross	January 9, 2016
Yang is disqualified from the tournament; while Blake remains wary, citing her past experiences with Adam, she ultimately decides to trust her. Meanwhile, Pyrrha remains conflicted about Ozpin's offer and while discussing their perspectives on fatalism, Jaune unintentionally encourages her to become the Fall Maiden, which upsets her. Yang discusses having encountered Raven with Qrow, who warns that she is dangerous. On her way to the colosseum, Ruby meets up with Velvet, who mentions that Coco also experienced "hallucinations" during her match against Emerald and Mercury. Ruby spots Emerald in the audience and tries to investigate, but runs into Mercury just as the next match is announced- Penny vs Pyrrha.
37	9	"PvP"	Kerry Shawcross; Gray Haddock; Miles Luna	Miles Luna; Monty Oum; Kerry Shawcross	January 16, 2016
During the match, Emerald uses her Semblance on Pyrrha, causing her inadvertently to tear Penny apart. Everyone is horrified, and Cinder uses the computer virus to take control of the public broadcast system and blame all incidents on Ozpin and Ironwood. The negative emotions of the people are amplified, causing hordes of Grimm to attack Beacon Academy, Amity Colosseum and Vale. Neo frees Torchwick and they gain control of Ironwood's flagship. Adam and the White Fang arrive at Beacon.
38	10	"Battle of Beacon"	Kerry Shawcross; Gray Haddock; Miles Luna	Miles Luna; Monty Oum; Kerry Shawcross	January 30, 2016
As the Grimm attack continues, Ruby rallies the support of various student teams. They commandeer a transport to fly back to Beacon and defend it. Torchwick uploads the virus on Ironwood's flagship, seizing control of Atlesian android soldiers and causing the transport to crash. Weiss and Blake separate from each other, and Blake runs into Adam. As Cinder has her associates broadcast the destruction, she spots Ozpin, Pyrrha and Jaune heading for the Fall Maiden's vault. A giant dragon Grimm bursts out of Mountain Glenn and flies towards Beacon, spawning more Grimm onto the battlefield.
39	11	"Heroes and Monsters"	Kerry Shawcross; Gray Haddock; Miles Luna	Miles Luna; Monty Oum; Kerry Shawcross	February 6, 2016
Ruby fights Neo and Torchwick, after landing on the damaged flagship. Although they overwhelm her, Ruby manages to knock Neo off, while Torchwick is killed by a Grimm. In Vale, Ironwood joins Qrow and Beacon's teachers against the corrupted androids and Grimm. At Beacon Academy, the students battle the White Fang, Velvet and Weiss using their Semblances to take out the White Fang's Paladins. Blake encounters and battles Adam, but is wounded. Adam declares that he will punish her "betrayal" by destroying everything she loves, just as Yang arrives and attacks. Adam severs Yang's right arm, but Blake gets herself and Yang to safety. In the vault, Ozpin starts to transfer Amber's powers into Pyrrha, but Cinder kills Amber before the process is complete, stealing her remaining powers.
40	12	"End of the Beginning"	Kerry Shawcross; Gray Haddock; Miles Luna	Miles Luna; Monty Oum; Kerry Shawcross	February 13, 2016
Cinder kills Ozpin and confronts Pyrrha. The dragon destroys the CCT tower. Cinder kills Pyrrha, after she questions her on fatalism, just as Ruby arrives. Horrified, she unleashes white light from her eyes that petrifies the dragon and Cinder escapes. When Ruby wakes up at home, Qrow explains that her ability comes being from a line of rare and powerful silver-eyed warriors, like her mother. With the CCT tower destroyed, civilians have lost trust in the kingdoms, while Ruby's team has scattered, and Yang is traumatized by her injury and Blake's disappearance. As winter falls, Ruby, Jaune, Nora, and Ren travel to Haven, where Qrow suspects Cinder will attack next. The narrator reveals herself as Salem, the true mastermind behind the Fall of Beacon. In a post-credits scene, Qrow follows Ruby and her friends, revealing to the viewer his ability to transform into a crow. Note: This episode is dedicated to Monty Oum.

=== Volume 4 (2016–17) ===
Volume 4 was announced by Gray Haddock on April 1, 2016, with the premiere set for Fall 2016. Before the volume began, the "Volume 4 Character Short" was screened at RTX 2016 and was later released online on October 3, 2016, the first "trailer" since Volume 1 to include a unique part of the story. Chapter 1 premiered on October 22, 2016, for Rooster Teeth "First members" (formerly "sponsors"), 24 hours later for members of the Rooster Teeth website, and one week later for the general public on YouTube. Weekly release day and time were the same as for Volume 3. This release schedule was continued throughout the Volume, which concluded on February 4, 2017.

Volume 4 picks up about six to eight months after the Fall of Beacon in Volume 3's finale and is the first series produced on Autodesk Maya after transitioning from Poser.

No. overall	No. in volume	Title	Directed by	Written by	Release date
P5	0	"Volume 4 Character Short"	Kerry Shawcross; Miles Luna; Gray Haddock	Miles Luna; Kerry Shawcross	October 3, 2016
At night, Ruby finds a small village in the distance under attack by Grimm. After defeating the gorilla-type Beringel, she receives a call from Jaune, Nora, and Ren, and asks them to hurry to her side as more Grimm emerge.
41	1	"The Next Step"	Kerry Shawcross; Miles Luna; Gray Haddock	Miles Luna; Kerry Shawcross	October 22, 2016
Salem targets Haven Academy in Mistral next. While Cinder stays with Salem for rehabilitation (Ruby's sliver eyes having damaged her left eye, arm, and vocal cords) Watts is ordered to meet with a correspondent in Mistral, Hazel to meet with Adam, and Tyrian to apprehend Ruby, who is viewed as a threat due to her eyes. Meanwhile, Ruby, Nora, Jaune, and Ren, now known as Team RNJR, fight a Geist threatening a nearby village. As part of the reward, the village's blacksmith upgrades Jaune's equipment with metal from Pyrrha's armor. The group leaves for Shion Village, hoping to catch an airship to Haven Academy.
42	2	"Remembrance"	Kerry Shawcross; Miles Luna; Gray Haddock	Miles Luna; Kerry Shawcross	October 29, 2016
Weiss' father Jacques forces the latter to perform at a charity event, intended to boost his company's image after the Fall of Beacon. In Mistral, Team RNJR reaches Shion Village, but finds it destroyed and the villagers dead. A mortally wounded Huntsman reveals that bandits, followed up by Grimm, are responsible. Later, Ruby witnesses a grieving Jaune training relentlessly by night, while watching a recording of Pyrrha.
43	3	"Of Runaways and Stowaways"	Kerry Shawcross; Miles Luna; Gray Haddock	Miles Luna; Kerry Shawcross	November 5, 2016
A traumatized Blake travels to Menagerie by ship, which falls under the attack of a giant Grimm. She defeats it with the help of Sun, who secretly followed her after Beacon's destruction. He offers her assistance in investigating the White Fang. However, Blake wants to return home to reconnect with her parents. In Patch, Yang receives a bionic arm from Ironwood, but she is hesitant to try it on, still suffering from her memories of Adam.
44	4	"Family"	Kerry Shawcross; Miles Luna; Gray Haddock	Miles Luna; Kerry Shawcross	November 19, 2016
Ozpin's soul merges with a Mistral farmboy, Oscar Pine, whom he tries to communicate to. In Patch, Yang confides her reluctance in confronting her fears to her father Taiyang, Port and Oobleck. After realizing Taiyang did not go after Ruby due to his concern for her, Yang decides to try the arm on and beings to train with Taiyang. Following Team RNJR to a tavern, Qrow meets his twin sister, Raven, now leading the bandit tribe that raised her and Qrow. The two end up criticizing each other for abandoning their families, and Raven leaves with neither of them gaining the information they were looking for.
45	5	"Menagerie"	Kerry Shawcross; Miles Luna; Gray Haddock	Miles Luna; Kerry Shawcross	December 3, 2016
Blake and Sun arrive in Kuo Kuana, the main city of Menagerie, and Blake is reunited with her parents. Two representatives of the White Fang, Corsac and Fennec Albain, visit the Belladonnas, and when confronted about the White Fang's role in the Fall of Beacon, they state that a splinter group under Adam's lead is responsible. After their visit, Corsac and Fennec agree to inform Adam of Blake's homecoming.
46	6	"Tipping Point"	Kerry Shawcross; Miles Luna; Gray Haddock	Miles Luna; Kerry Shawcross	December 10, 2016
Weiss performs at the charity concert, but remains critical of all the attendees and guests for their shallow and dismissive behavior towards Beacon. At the after party, she is enraged upon hearing a woman mock the Fall of Beacon and inadvertently summons a Boarbatusk. In Mistral, Team RNJR comes across an abandoned town called Oniyuri. Before they can leave, Tyrian ambushes them and is revealed to be a scorpion Faunus. He easily defeats them and attempts to seize Ruby, but is stopped by Qrow.
47	7	"Punished"	Kerry Shawcross; Miles Luna; Gray Haddock	Miles Luna; Kerry Shawcross	December 24, 2016
Ozpin informs Oscar that their souls and Aura have merged, and they can access each other's memories. While Oscar is reluctant to accept this, Ozpin urges him to go to Haven to carry out an important task. In Atlas, Weiss is blamed for hurting the Schnees' reputation, and is confined to her room and disinherited. In Oniyuri, despite Qrow's warnings to stay back, Ruby joins him in battle. Tyrian wounds Qrow, and escapes after losing his stinger.
48	8	"A Much Needed Talk"	Kerry Shawcross; Miles Luna; Gray Haddock	Miles Luna; Kerry Shawcross	December 31, 2016
That night, Qrow explains to Team RNJR about the two God brothers of light and darkness, the creation of mankind and the Grimm, and that they, as Huntsmen, have the duty to protect the four relics (Creation, Destruction, Knowledge and Choice) within the Huntsmen Academies, as they are sought by Salem. The next day, Qrow's illness gets worsened. Blake mends her relationship with Ghira, who comforts her about lashing out at him and staying in the White Fang. Sun arrives and warns Blake about a masked White Fang member in the market. The two notice a spy outside and give chase.
49	9	"Two Steps Forward, Two Steps Back"	Kerry Shawcross; Miles Luna; Gray Haddock	Miles Luna; Kerry Shawcross	January 7, 2017
Taiyang teaches Yang that she should not rely on her Semblance as much as she has been. Meanwhile, Weiss has been practicing her summoning and manages to summon an Armored Knight. Meanwhile, Blake and Sun discover that Blake's old friend Ilia Amitola, is now a White Fang member. Determined to find her, they manage to steal her scroll, but Sun is injured in the process, allowing Ilia to escape. At the same time, Team RNJR are forced to choose between taking two paths. Ren and Nora decide to take the mountain path, while Ruby and Jaune carry Qrow through Kuroyuri.
50	10	"Kuroyuri"	Kerry Shawcross; Miles Luna; Gray Haddock	Miles Luna; Kerry Shawcross	January 21, 2017
Ozpin persuades Oscar to set out for Mistral. He briefly encounters Hazel along the way, though each remains unaware of the other's identity. Ren and Nora's past is revealed through a flashback: years ago, Kuroyuri is attacked by Grimm, led by a Nuckelavee, and Ren's parents are killed. Ren's Semblance activates when he sees Nora in danger, which calms him down and hides their presence from the Grimm. In the present, Ren and Nora learn that the Nuckelavee is headed towards Ruby, Jaune, and Qrow.
51	11	"Taking Control"	Kerry Shawcross; Miles Luna; Gray Haddock	Miles Luna; Kerry Shawcross	January 28, 2017
Yang prepares to leave, and Taiyang asks if she is going after Ruby or Raven. Weiss, with Klein's help, sneaks out of the Schnee Manor, hoping to find Winter in Mistral. In Menagerie, Blake confesses to Sun about leaving her friends in fear of them getting hurt, who condemns her for it. After learning that Ilia's scroll contained Adam's plans to attack Haven, Blake decides to reclaim the White Fang. Meanwhile, Ren and Nora desperately rush towards Kuroyuri, where the Nuckelavee-Grimm emerges.
52	12	"No Safe Haven"	Kerry Shawcross; Miles Luna; Gray Haddock	Miles Luna; Kerry Shawcross	February 4, 2017
While Jaune protects Qrow, Ren begins fighting the Nuckelavee recklessly, until Nora calms him down. Team RNJR comes up with a coordinated strategy and Ren kills the Grimm. Two patrolling military airships from Mistral arrive and they take Team RNJR to Mistral. Meanwhile, Blake and Sun prepare to confront the White Fang, while Yang reaches Anima and sets off, in search of Ruby or Raven. Ruby and her group plan to visit Professor Lionheart at Haven Academy once Qrow's injuries are fully healed. Unbeknownst to them, Lionheart works for Watts. In a post-credits scene, Oscar meets Qrow in a bar and identifies himself as Ozpin. Qrow returns his cane.

=== Volume 5 (2017–18) ===
Trailer for Volume 5 of RWBY

The fifth Volume premiered on October 14, 2017, a date which was first announced at the RTX Austin 2017 event. The episodes were released to Rooster Teeth FIRST members Saturdays at 10 am CT, then to Rooster Teeth registered members the following Tuesday, and to the general public the following Saturday.

On July 17, 2017, Rooster Teeth released the first trailer for the upcoming Volume, the "Volume 5 Weiss Character Short". It was followed up by the "Volume 5 Blake Character Short" on September 4, 2017, and the "Volume 5 Yang Character Short" on October 14, 2017. These Character Shorts, like the original four trailers and the "Volume 4 Character Short", tell unique parts of the story.

At New York Comic Con 2017, it was announced that Volume 5 would be 14 episodes long, instead of the usual 12. The volume concluded on January 20, 2018. It is the final volume to be released on YouTube, following various Rooster Teeth videos being subsequently demonetized.

No. overall	No. in volume	Title	Directed by	Written by	Release date
P6	0	"Volume 5 Weiss Character Short"	Kerry Shawcross; Miles Luna; Gray Haddock	Miles Luna; Kerry Shawcross	July 17, 2017
As Weiss travels to Mistral, she dreams of a time when she was younger. In a flashback, Weiss trains with Winter to fight multiple Beowolves summoned from Winter's Semblance. When she is nearly defeated, she calls out for Winter, who ends the training. Winter tells her that she will not be there to rescue her and that she needs to work harder if she wants to leave Atlas.
P7	0	"Volume 5 Blake Character Short"	Kerry Shawcross; Miles Luna; Gray Haddock	Miles Luna; Kerry Shawcross	September 4, 2017
In Menagerie, Blake and Sun chase a member of the White Fang. Between the chase, flashbacks of Blake and Ilia's friendship are seen. In the past, Ilia explains about embracing her identity as a Faunus after the death of her parents. In the present, Ilia intervenes in the chase, and instead of fighting, she helps the White Fang member escape.
P8	0	"Volume 5 Yang Character Short"	Kerry Shawcross; Miles Luna; Gray Haddock	Miles Luna; Kerry Shawcross	October 14, 2017
As Yang travels in Mistral, she reminisces the time before she was to leave for Beacon Academy. In a flashback, she trains Ruby in hand-to-hand combat to make sure she can survive on her own without her weapon. During their training, they are attacked by a large Ursa. Yang defeats it, but she is injured in the process. Ruby apologizes for not helping her, but Yang calms her by reminding her that she will always be there for her.
53	1	"Welcome to Haven"	Kerry Shawcross; Miles Luna; Gray Haddock	Miles Luna; Kerry Shawcross	October 14, 2017
Qrow and Team RNJR visit Professor Leonardo Lionheart to protect Haven's relic, which can only be accessed by the Spring Maiden. After Lionheart rejects Qrow's plan, Qrow is approached by Oscar, who identifies himself as Ozpin. The Belladonnas confront the Albains about the information from Ilia's scroll, but they blame Ilia. Blake decides to go public with the information, despite Ilia's warnings to leave. Somewhere in Mistral, a shady man offers to lead Yang to Raven.
54	2	"Dread in the Air"	Kerry Shawcross; Miles Luna; Gray Haddock	Miles Luna; Kerry Shawcross	October 21, 2017
Lionheart, secretly a mole for Salem, informs her that Raven and her tribe hold the Spring Maiden. Salem tasks Cinder with obtaining the Maiden to unlock Haven's relic. Weiss' airship is attacked by Lancers, wasp-type Grimm. She kills their Queen by summoning her Armored Knight, but the damaged airship crashes and she is captured by Raven's tribe. When the White Fang's Leader Sienna Khan rejects Hazel's offer of assistance from Salem, Adam usurps and kills her, ordering that humans be framed for her death.
55	3	"Unforeseen Complications"	Kerry Shawcross; Miles Luna; Gray Haddock	Miles Luna; Kerry Shawcross	October 28, 2017
Blake and her parents hold a press conference to persuade the Faunus to help Mistral, but Ilia publicly denounces the Belladonnas as traitors and sways trust in them. Ozpin explains his reincarnation to Team RNJR and, predicting Salem will attack Haven Academy in one month, he decides to train both them and Oscar. As both he and Qrow find Lionheart's behavior suspicious, they decide not to reveal Ozpin's presence yet. Weiss, who is captured by bandits, learns Winter has since left for Atlas and summons a small Knight to help her escape.
56	4	"Lighting the Fire"	Kerry Shawcross; Miles Luna; Gray Haddock	Miles Luna; Kerry Shawcross	November 4, 2017
In Haven, team RNJR and Oscar spar together. Arriving at the bandit camp, Yang demands Raven help her get to Ruby with her Semblance. Raven initially refuses, claiming that Ozpin is not to be trusted, but Weiss escapes her confinement with the help of her Armored Knight and reunites with Yang. Not wanting to attract Grimm, Raven agrees to Yang's demands and summons her and Weiss to her tent to tell them what they need to know.
57	5	"Necessary Sacrifice"	Kerry Shawcross; Miles Luna; Gray Haddock	Miles Luna; Kerry Shawcross	November 11, 2017
Blake and Sun fail to get enough signatures for their petition to save Haven Academy, due to the Faunus in Menagerie wanting to avoid conflict. Despite knowing she will have to face Ilia, Blake hopes to save her from the White Fang. In Mistral, RNJR's training continues and Ruby reassures Oscar's insecurities. Meanwhile, Ilia is commanded by the Albains to assassinate Blake's parents and bring Blake alive to Adam.
58	6	"Known by its Song"	Kerry Shawcross; Miles Luna; Gray Haddock	Miles Luna; Kerry Shawcross	November 18, 2017
Qrow searches Mistral for fellow Huntsmen but finds that many of them are missing and presumably dead. At her camp, Raven explains that she and Qrow initially joined Beacon to fight back against Huntsmen that posed a threat to their tribe but won Ozpin's favor as part of Team STRQ. However, she lost trust in Ozpin after learning of his magical abilities, Salem's existence, and other secrets. She demonstrates the shapeshifting power Ozpin gifted her and Qrow and offers Yang a choice to stay with her and get more "answers", claiming Qrow and Ozpin are not to be trusted. Yang and Weiss instead choose to leave and reunite with Ruby.
59	7	"Rest and Resolutions"	Kerry Shawcross; Miles Luna; Gray Haddock	Miles Luna; Kerry Shawcross	November 25, 2017
Everyone has a heartfelt reunion over dinner. Later, Yang confronts Ozpin about using magic on Qrow and Raven, who admits he gave them shapeshifting abilities to spy on Salem- as well as being the old man who gave the original Maidens their power. He offers them the choice to continue to fight, which they all accept, providing he keeps no further secrets. Meanwhile, Cinder, Watts, Mercury, and Emerald arrive at Raven's camp, having learned her location thanks to Lionheart's conversation with Qrow.
60	8	"Alone Together"	Kerry Shawcross; Miles Luna; Gray Haddock	Miles Luna; Kerry Shawcross	December 2, 2017
Yang is upset when Ruby mentions Blake later in the morning. Weiss ends up comforting her by telling her own version of loneliness and asks that she trust that Blake will come back. In Menagerie, Blake receives a note from Ilia to meet with her, but it turns out to be an ambush. Sun rescues Blake from her captors and they rush to help her parents, who are defending their home from White Fang insurgents.
61	9	"A Perfect Storm"	Kerry Shawcross; Miles Luna; Gray Haddock	Miles Luna; Kerry Shawcross	December 9, 2017
Cinder strikes a deal with Raven and Vernal, the Spring Maiden, to help her unlock the relic. Despite knowing that Salem will have her killed anyway, Raven accepts her offer on the condition she kills Qrow, while secretly planning to take the relic for herself. Blake and Sun defend Ghira from an attack and, while Blake is on her way to look for Kali, she is forced to fight Ilia.
62	10	"True Colors"	Kerry Shawcross; Miles Luna; Gray Haddock	Miles Luna; Kerry Shawcross	December 16, 2017
As the Belladonnas and Sun battle the White Fang, Ilia is torn between her feelings for Blake and her political allegiance until Ghira saves her from falling debris, causing her to turn against the White Fang. When the Albain brothers intervene, Fennec is killed, and the Belladonnas and Sun are victorious. Forgiving Ilia, Blake convinces the Faunus of Menagerie that they need to stop Adam and the majority join her.
63	11	"The More the Merrier"	Kerry Shawcross; Miles Luna; Gray Haddock	Miles Luna; Kerry Shawcross	December 30, 2017
Ruby and the rest of her group meet with Lionheart, where his allegiance to Salem is revealed. Raven, Vernal, Cinder, Emerald, Mercury, and Hazel ambush them, with the latter revealing that the White Fang have also arrived as they prepare to destroy the school. Jaune recklessly attacks Cinder, attempting to avenge Pyrrha's death. Ruby's silver eyes activate, causing Cinder pain in her left arm, but Emerald stuns Ruby before she can inflict more damage. Enraged, Cinder conjures an obsidian spear and impales Weiss through the side.
64	12	"Vault of the Spring Maiden"	Kerry Shawcross; Miles Luna; Gray Haddock	Miles Luna; Kerry Shawcross	January 6, 2018
Hazel becomes enraged learning of Ozpin's presence and fights him and Qrow to settle an old grudge. Jaune unlocks his Semblance and amplifies Weiss' Aura to heal her wound, while Ruby, Yang, Ren, and Nora battle Lionheart, Emerald, and Mercury. Upon entering the vault, Cinder reveals that Salem replaced her left arm with a Grimm arm after her defeat at Beacon. She uses it to fatally impale Vernal, attempting to steal her Maiden powers. However, Raven reveals that she is the real Spring Maiden and prepares to fight Cinder for the Relic.
65	13	"Downfall"	Kerry Shawcross; Miles Luna; Gray Haddock	Miles Luna; Kerry Shawcross	January 13, 2018
Ruby distracts Emerald and Mercury long enough for Yang to pursue Raven and Cinder, while a recovered Weiss summons the Lancer Queen to defeat Hazel. As Adam and the White Fang prepare to destroy the CCT tower, Blake arrives with the rest of the Faunus and the Mistral Police, while Ilia disarms Adam's planted explosives. After a grueling battle, Raven, aided by the dying Vernal, defeats Cinder and knocks her into an abyss, but is confronted by Yang before she can claim the unlocked Relic.
66	14	"Haven's Fate"	Kerry Shawcross; Miles Luna; Gray Haddock	Miles Luna; Kerry Shawcross	January 20, 2018
Defeated by Blake and Sun, Adam flees, allowing Ghira to reclaim leadership of the White Fang. In the vault, Yang denounces Raven as a self–serving coward, having deduced that she took the previous Spring Maiden's life. Pointing out that whoever takes the Relic will be hunted by Salem, Yang claims it herself, as she is willing to face Salem. Ashamed, Raven flees after apologizing to Yang, leaving her in tears. Lionheart attempts to flee, but is killed by Salem for his failure. Broken by Cinder's defeat, Emerald creates a vision of Salem to terrify her enemies, allowing her, Mercury and Hazel to escape. Blake is welcomed back by RWBY as Ozpin directs them towards their next mission: escorting the Relic (The Lamp of Knowledge) to Atlas. In a post-credits scene, Raven is shown to have fled to Patch, where Taiyang notices her presence.

=== Volume 6 (2018–19) ===
The intro for Volume 6 of RWBY

Announced at RTX Austin 2018, the sixth volume premiered on October 27, 2018.

On August 17, 2018, Rooster Teeth released the "Volume 6 Adam Character Short" before the premiere episode. Focusing on Adam Taurus, the short tells a unique part of the story similar to the original four trailers and the various character shorts for Volume 4 and Volume 5.

After taking a regular Christmas, Volume 6 concluded on January 26, 2019.

Unlike prior volumes, Volume 6 did not originally air on YouTube following various Rooster Teeth videos being demonetized. Volume 6 episodes later began airing on YouTube on November 2, 2019, alongside the Volume 7 premiere on the Rooster Teeth website.

No. overall	No. in volume	Title	Directed by	Written by	Release date
P9	0	"Volume 6 Adam Character Short"	Kerry Shawcross; Connor Pickens	Miles Luna; Kerry Shawcross	August 17, 2018
In a flashback, Adam Taurus rises up the White Fang's ranks after killing a human during an altercation, angering Ghira while gaining support from Sienna as other White Fang members applaud him for defending their kind. Blake grows uneasy over Adam's increasing brutality yet is manipulated into supporting him. Sienna eventually becomes the organization's leader and places Adam in charge of their branch in Vale. After usurping Sienna in the events of Volume 5, Adam prepares to raid Haven Academy, but is then shown fleeing Haven after the attack fails.
67	1	"Argus Limited"	Kerry Shawcross; Connor Pickens	Miles Luna; Kerry Shawcross	October 27, 2018
Ruby and her friends board a train for Argus in northern Anima while Sun rejoins his team departing for Vacuo. During the train ride, a Grimm attack forces Ozpin to admit the Relic draws them. While Jaune, Ren, and Nora separate to protect the passengers from the Grimm, Team RWBY, Qrow and Oscar stay on the remaining cars, but the Sphinx destroys the train tracks and crashes them. The group, along with a passenger named Maria Calavera, emerges unharmed but stranded. Meanwhile, Adam, enraged at his defeat by Blake, betrays and kills the remaining members of the White Fang, when they disown him as their leader.
68	2	"Uncovered"	Kerry Shawcross; Connor Pickens	Miles Luna; Kerry Shawcross	November 3, 2018
Having survived the battle with Raven, Cinder attempts to track Ruby through a broker called Lil' Miss Malachite. Team RWBY questioned Ozpin for his continued secrecy and he professes past betrayals make him slow to trust; however, Oscar reveals he is still hiding something. Despite Ozpin's pleas, Ruby activates the Relic of Knowledge, whose spirit, Jinn, answers three questions every 100 years. With two questions still available, Ruby asks to know what Ozpin is hiding from them and Jinn begins a vision of the past, showing a then-human Salem.
69	3	"The Lost Fable"	Kerry Shawcross; Connor Pickens	Miles Luna; Kerry Shawcross	November 10, 2018
In a flashback, Salem's rescuer and lover Ozma dies from illness and she pleads with the gods into resurrecting him, causing a confrontation between them. As punishment for causing their argument, they curse Salem with immortality to make her acknowledge the cycle of life and death. Refusing to accept this, Salem manipulates mankind against the gods for revenge; however, the God of Darkness erases humanity, driving her to attempt suicide in a Grimm pool, but instead morphing into her current form. The God of Light offers Ozma reincarnation to help continue his task to protect the second humanity, to which Ozma agrees to allow him to recover the four Relics, which if united will summon the Gods' return for Judgement. While Salem and Ozma reunite and start a family, their different views on guiding humanity eventually turn them against each other, leading to endless conflict and their daughters' deaths. Ozma eventually comes to believe the only solution is to destroy Salem but when he asks the lamp how to do so, Jinn replies that he cannot.
70	4	"So That's How It Is"	Kerry Shawcross; Connor Pickens	Miles Luna; Kerry Shawcross	November 17, 2018
With Ozpin revealed as Ozma, Team RWBY realizes he has no plan for defeating Salem. Ashamed of his failures and belittled by everyone's admonishments, Ozpin locks himself away in Oscar's mind while the group searches for shelter. Meanwhile, Emerald, Mercury, and Hazel report the events at Haven Academy to Salem, who is enraged learning Ozpin already reincarnated. Later, Team RWBY, Oscar, Qrow, and Maria use an abandoned farm for shelter.
71	5	"The Coming Storm"	Kerry Shawcross; Connor Pickens	Miles Luna; Kerry Shawcross	November 24, 2018
Cinder is tracked down by Neo, who blames her for Torchwick's death, but Cinder recruits her based on their mutual grudge against Ruby. Meanwhile, Ruby's group discovers the farm's residents' corpses and realizes it was not abandoned, starting a search for their supplies. While finding transport, Yang sees a flashback of Adam, but views Blake's concern for her as pity. Ruby and Weiss search for food, and a thump can be heard from the cellar door.
72	6	"Alone in the Woods"	Kerry Shawcross; Connor Pickens	Miles Luna; Kerry Shawcross	December 1, 2018
Qrow sinks deeper into his alcoholism, and Ruby's group begins losing hope, resulting in Ruby inadvertently dropping the Relic of Knowledge into a well. Team RWBY enters the well to find it and discovers a pack of Grimm called the Apathy, which can numb emotion and willpower, and had caused the farmers' deaths. They petrify the team, but Maria, who is revealed to be a silver-eyed warrior, helps Ruby activate her silver eyes to destroy them. After fleeing the village, the group apologizes to Ruby for nearly giving up.
73	7	"The Grimm Reaper"	Kerry Shawcross; Connor Pickens	Miles Luna; Kerry Shawcross	December 8, 2018
Cinder offers to let Neo kill Ruby in exchange for retrieving the Relic of Knowledge. Meanwhile, Maria reveals she was a famous Huntress called "the Grimm Reaper", but went into hiding after being blinded in battle. Ruby asks Maria to teach her about silver eyes as the group arrives in Argus, where they reunite with Jaune's team at his sister Saphron's home. However, Jaune reveals the Atlas military refuses to see them, leaving them stuck in the city.
74	8	"Dead End"	Kerry Shawcross; Connor Pickens	Miles Luna; Kerry Shawcross	December 15, 2018
Caroline Cordovin, the officer in charge of Argus and an old enemy of Maria's, denies everyone but Weiss permission to enter Atlas. Team RWBY tells Jaune's group what they learned from the Relic, causing Jaune to snap at Oscar as he feels that Pyrrha died for nothing. Maria then reveals to Ruby that Silver-Eyed Warriors hid themselves to avoid Salem, and that Jinn's vision showed their power came from the God of Light. The rest of the team then finds Oscar missing.
75	9	"Lost"	Kerry Shawcross; Connor Pickens	Miles Luna; Kerry Shawcross	December 29, 2018
Emerald and Mercury argue on what to do without Cinder, but Tyrian mocks their doubts before leaving with Watts for Atlas. Meanwhile, Jaune's group searches for Oscar, where Jaune finds a memorial to Pyrrha and Pyrrha's mother, who inspires him with her memory to continue. Everyone returns to find Oscar safe at home and Jaune apologizes for his behavior, proposing they steal an Atlas ship to bypass security.
76	10	"Stealing from the Elderly"	Kerry Shawcross; Connor Pickens	Miles Luna; Kerry Shawcross	January 5, 2019
Weiss and Maria steal one of Atlas' airships while Blake goes to disable the radar tower. However, Blake is attacked by Adam - who has stalked her across Anima - and Yang moves to help her, while Cordovin pilots a giant mecha suit to take down the airship. Qrow blames the misfortune on his Semblance, but Ruby reassures him and rallies the group to fight Cordovin.
77	11	"The Lady in the Shoe"	Kerry Shawcross; Connor Pickens	Miles Luna; Kerry Shawcross	January 12, 2019
Ruby and Jaune's teams coordinate to distract Cordovin while Qrow and Ren bring down her robot's shields, but its armor blunts most of their attacks. Cordovin eventually gains the upper hand, forcing Maria and Oscar to risk the airship against her. Meanwhile, after chasing Blake through the forest, Adam disarms her, but Yang arrives and forces him back. Adam shakes Yang's confidence with his threats, but Blake soon rejoins the fight, stating that she and Yang are protecting each other.
78	12	"Seeing Red"	Kerry Shawcross; Connor Pickens	Miles Luna; Kerry Shawcross	January 19, 2019
Cordovin brings down the airship, but Ruby fires a shot directly into the robot's cannon to implode it. Yang and Blake battle Adam together, despite his attempts to manipulate them apart. All three exhaust their Auras, but Blake and Yang finally kill Adam by stabbing him with Blake's broken sword. Yang embraces Blake, who tearfully assures her that she will keep her promise. Cordovin attempts to call reinforcements, but the Atlesians are busy confronting a Grimm Leviathan that is approaching Argus.
79	13	"Our Way"	Kerry Shawcross; Connor Pickens	Miles Luna; Kerry Shawcross	January 26, 2019
Stealing an airship, Neo and Cinder head to Atlas. In Argus, Ruby uses her silver eyes to freeze the Leviathan, allowing Cordovin's mech to kill it and save the city. In return, Cordovin allows the group to leave for Atlas. However, they arrive to find it blockaded by the entire Atlas Air Fleet. In a post-credits scene, Mercury and Emerald watch Salem prepare an army of flying Beringel. Hazel states that she plans to lead the next invasion personally.

=== Volume 7 (2019–20) ===
The intro for Volume 7 of RWBY

The seventh volume premiered on November 2, 2019, concluding on February 1, 2020. It is the first volume since Volume 3 not to include a character short and the first without a post-credits scene.

No. overall	No. in volume	Title	Directed by	Written by	Original release date
80	1	"The Greatest Kingdom"	Kerry Shawcross	Miles Luna; Kerry Shawcross	November 2, 2019
Ruby's group lands in Mantle, the city below Atlas, but become uncertain of Ironwood after seeing the state of the city. Maria takes the group to Dr. Pietro Polendina, who informs them of Ironwood's increasing paranoia following the fall of Beacon. While Ruby's group fends off the invading Sabyrs, they are assisted by Penny, who is revealed to have been repaired by Pietro and now serves as Mantle's protector. However, Ruby's group is arrested by the Ace-Ops, a group of elite Atlas huntsmen.
81	2	"A New Approach"	Connor Pickens	Kiersi Burkhart	November 9, 2019
Ruby's group is brought to Ironwood, who plans to install a CCT tower on Amity Colosseum to inform the public about Salem and use his military force to handle the unrest it will cause. Ruby agrees to help, but hides what her group learned from Jinn. Meanwhile, Dr. Watts has taken control of Mantle's security systems to hide Tyrian committing a murder.
82	3	"Ace Operatives"	Kerry Shawcross	Miles Luna; Kerry Shawcross	November 16, 2019
RWBY and JNR receive upgrades to their weapons and outfits. Yang reveals her uncertainties about lying to Ironwood but the other members of RWBY assure her they will tell him the truth when the time is right. Ruby gives the relic to Oscar for safekeeping in Atlas while RWBY, JNR, and the Ace-Ops go on a mission to clear a launch site for the tower. They pursue and kill a powerful Geist through abandoned dust mines while RWBY learn about the Ace-Ops weapons, Semblances, and team strategies. Meanwhile, Tyrian kills a Mantle activist speaking out against Ironwood.
83	4	"Pomp and Circumstance"	Paula Decanini; Dustin Matthews	Eddy Rivas	November 23, 2019
Ironwood reveals that someone is attempting to frame him by killing his critics. Jacques lectures Ironwood for using his old mine for military purposes and unsuccessfully confronts Weiss. Afterwards, Ironwood grants Teams RWBY and JNR their huntsmen licenses. Ruby questions whether it is right to keep hiding Jinn's knowledge from him, to which Qrow is uncertain himself. Watts offers to help Jacques with the election for a seat on Atlas' governing council.
84	5	"Sparks"	Connor Pickens	Eddy Rivas	November 30, 2019
RWBY and JNR go through training and missions to help with the construction of Amity Tower. Robyn Hill, the leader of the Happy Huntresses, a Mantle activist group and a candidate for the upcoming election, becomes suspicious about Mantle's construction supplies going to Amity. Winter reveals to Weiss that Ironwood chose her to become the new Winter Maiden when the current one dies. Jacques announces that he is closing all SDC operations until he wins the election, causing a riot in Mantle.
85	6	"A Night Off"	Paula Decanini	Eddy Rivas; Kiersi Burkhart; Miles Luna	December 7, 2019
As Mantle recovers from the riot, RWBY and JNR are given the night off. Ruby, Nora and Ren go to Robyn's political rally where Watts causes a blackout and hacks the election in Jacques's favor. Tyrian kills several people at the rally in the dark and frames Penny for them, while Watts uploads a doctored video with Penny committing the crime instead of Tyrian. The panic that ensues causes a Grimm invasion in Mantle.
86	7	"Worst Case Scenario"	Connor Pickens	Eddy Rivas; Kiersi Burkhart; Miles Luna	December 14, 2019
After the Grimm invasion is suppressed, Robyn and the Happy Huntresses begin stealing supplies from the military, grinding progress on the tower to a halt. Ironwood calls for Robyn's arrest and for Tyrian to be found. Blake and Yang go against orders, and tell Robyn about the Amity Tower project and ask her to give them more time. Pietro extracts the raw footage of the attack from Penny to try and prove her innocence to the public and reveals that he made Penny from his own Aura. Jacques invites Ironwood to his manor to defend his seat on the council.
87	8	"Cordially Invited"	Dustin Matthews	Miles Luna	December 21, 2019
The council, with Robyn in attendance, berate Ironwood over withholding information in closing Atlas's borders and recent events. Weiss heads to Jacques's office to search for his involvement in the election and reunites with her mother Willow, who gives her a recording of Jacques's meeting with Watts. Meanwhile, Watts disables the heating systems in Mantle as a snowstorm starts.
88	9	"As Above, So Below"	Paula Decanini	Eddy Rivas; Kiersi Burkhart	January 4, 2020
Weiss presents the video of Jacques'ss dealings with Watts to the council and arrests him. However, Mantle is under attack from Grimm caused by the citizens' rioting over the lost heating. Oscar encourages Ironwood to trust Robyn and later reveals what Ruby's group learned from Jinn. RWBY, JNR, and the Ace-Ops fly into Mantle to evacuate the citizens, while Neo, having infiltrated the Schnee Manor, reports the meeting back to Cinder.
89	10	"Out in the Open"	Dustin Matthews; Connor Pickens	Kerry Shawcross; Kiersi Burkhart	January 11, 2020
While RWBY, JNR, and the Ace-Ops evacuate Mantle and fight off the invasion, Ironwood and Robyn send a broadcast revealing Salem to Mantle. Tyrian attacks Robyn, Clover, and Qrow, while Watts infiltrates the Amity Tower and confronts Ironwood. Meanwhile, Neo goes to steal the Lamp of Knowledge from Oscar, while Cinder targets the Winter Maiden.
90	11	"Gravity"	Paula Decanini; Kerry Shawcross	Miles Luna; Kerry Shawcross	January 18, 2020
Ironwood defeats Watts and Tyrian is arrested. However, Cinder's calling card causes Ironwood to panic and lose trust in Team RWBY for lying to him. Salem appears within the Seer from the bag Ironwood took from Watts, announcing she is coming to Atlas, and forcing Ironwood to surrender the Lamp of Knowledge and the Staff of Creation. However, Ironwood decides to abandon the rest of the world and save his own people, by sealing the Lamp of Knowledge, using the Staff of Creation to save Atlas, and leaving the people of Mantle to die. When Ironwood orders the Ace-Ops to arrest Ruby's allies, they resist them. Meanwhile, Cinder follows Winter to the Winter Maiden, while Team JNR discover Oscar gone.
91	12	"With Friends Like These"	Dustin Matthews; Connor Pickens	Kiersi Burkhart; Eddy Rivas	January 25, 2020
Team RWBY defeats the Ace-Ops. Tyrian exploits the captors' fighting to crash the transport ship, and kills Clover with Qrow's weapon, so the latter would be framed for murder. As Neo battles Oscar and Team JNR for the Lamp of Knowledge, Cinder faces Penny and Winter for the Winter Maiden.
92	13	"The Enemy of Trust"	Kerry Shawcross	Kerry Shawcross; Miles Luna; Eddy Rivas	February 1, 2020
While Neo escapes with the Lamp, the dying Winter Maiden passes her powers to Penny, and Cinder retreats when Ruby uses her Silver Eyes. After a failed persuasion, Ironwood sends Oscar off the platform, causing Ozpin and his magic to awaken. After saving Oscar, Ozpin delivers a soliloquy on his philosophy that "fear is the enemy of trust". Qrow and Robyn are arrested, while RWBY, JNR, Penny, Maria, and Pietro flee Atlas authorities in an airship. Salem arrives outside Atlas with an army of Grimm atop the whale-like Monstra.

=== Volume 8 (2020–21) ===
The intro for Volume 8 of RWBY

The eighth volume premiered on November 7, 2020 and concluded on March 27, 2021. It is the final volume to premiere on the Rooster Teeth website.

Although the volume took its regular Christmas break, due to the impact of the COVID-19 pandemic in the United States in regards to a slower production rollout with working remotely, the break was extended through January 2021 to early February. The tenth chapter was then delayed a week to February 27 to focus on the production team's safety during the February 13–17, 2021 North American winter storm, resulting in the volume's conclusion being pushed back to March 27.

No. overall	No. in volume	Title	Directed by	Written by	Original release date
93	1	"Divide"	Kerry Shawcross	Kiersi Burkhart; Kerry Shawcross	November 7, 2020
Salem is given the Lamp of Knowledge by Cinder and commands the Hound, a new-type Grimm, to capture Oscar in order to access it. Oscar reunites with Ruby's group, but decides to keep Ozpin's return a secret. Ruby's group disagree over their next move and split up: Ruby, Weiss, Blake, Nora, and Penny plan to sneak into the military base to launch Amity Tower and warn the rest of Remnant about Salem, while Yang, Ren, Jaune, and Oscar help the Happy Huntresses protect the Mantle civilians. Ironwood kills Councilman Sleet and declares martial law without the council's permission.
94	2	"Refuge"	Paula Decanini	Miles Luna	November 14, 2020
While Watts is taken to Ironwood, Ruby's team sneak into Atlas through a shipping company owned by the Schnee Dust Company. Penny expresses her discomfort of being the new Winter Maiden to Ruby. Meanwhile, Yang's team struggle with getting civilians to cooperate while Oscar personally struggles with the idea of his soul eventually fully merging with Ozpin. The Hound kidnaps Oscar as it suddenly evolves, speaks, and flies away, causing Yang's team to give chase.
95	3	"Strings"	Dustin Matthews	Kiersi Burkhart	November 21, 2020
Ruby's team sneak into the Atlas Military compound with help from May. Through Penny, Pietro hacks Ironwood's terminal to send a launch signal when Penny reaches Amity Tower. Upon leaving, they are ambushed by the Ace-Ops. The Ace-Ops steal one of Penny's swords to help Watts, under coercion from Ironwood, override controls to her. Nora uses her Semblance to help Ruby's team escape the base, but injures herself from channeling the excessive amount of electricity.
96	4	"Fault"	Connor Pickens	Eddy Rivas	November 28, 2020
Despite the efforts of Yang's team, the Hound escapes with Oscar, who is then tortured by Salem and Hazel for access to the Lamp of Knowledge. Upset at their continuous failures, Ren argues with Yang and Jaune over their lack of preparedness as Huntsmen and whether they are doing the right thing fighting Ironwood. Yang's group seek refuge at an outpost as Grimm appear from a forming fault, while Ruby's team hides at the Schnee Manor. Cinder secretly goes to Amity against Salem's orders for the Winter Maiden powers.
97	5	"Amity"	Paula Decanini	Miles Luna	December 5, 2020
Cinder, Neo, and Emerald infiltrate Amity Tower, but are defeated by Penny and Maria. However, Cinder damages Amity's engines and, despite Pietro's protests, Penny convinces him to let her finish moving Amity into signal range. Penny ultimately succeeds to move Amity Tower into place and broadcast Ruby's message to the world, but Watts hacks into Penny via her sword and the signal, rebooting her system and causing Amity to fall. As Winter and the Ace-Ops are sent to bring Penny to the vault, Watts steals Ironwood's scroll. Meanwhile, Yang's group discover a river of Grimm is flowing towards Mantle.
98	6	"Midnight"	Kerry Shawcross	Kerry Shawcross	December 12, 2020
Cinder dreams about her childhood, where she was adopted and worked as a slave to a wicked stepmother who owns a hotel in Atlas. A Huntsman, Rhodes, takes pity on Cinder and trains her to become a Huntress, but her family abuses her upon discovering her weapon and she kills them all - along with Rhodes when he disavows her actions. When Cinder awakens, Salem tortures Cinder similarly to her stepmother for defying her. Salem uses Monstra to invade Atlas as the river of Grimm breaks through the shields. While Cinder is ordered to find Watts and Penny, Oscar hopes to try and divide Salem's group.
99	7	"War"	Connor Pickens	Kiersi Burkhart; Miles Luna (additional writing)	December 19, 2020
Ironwood orders the Ace-Ops to destroy Monstra, but Jaune, Yang, and Ren, whose Semblance evolves, compromise with Winter to let them look for Oscar. After a debate with Ozpin, Oscar chooses to try earning Hazel's trust by revealing how to use the Lamp - and his fear that Salem wants the Gods to return and destroy Remnant in order to end her immortal life. Overhearing Oscar's words, Emerald warns Mercury about Salem's plan, as he leaves with Tyrian for Vacuo. Meanwhile, Whitley calls Klein to the Schnee Manor to help Nora and reconciles with Weiss, followed by Penny crash-landing at the front soon after.
100	8	"Dark"	Dustin Matthews	Miles Luna	February 6, 2021
The Schnee Manor faces a power outage and, as Ruby's team activates the internal generators, they are attacked by the Hound. As Ruby, Weiss, and Blake fend it off, a hacked Penny awakens and tries to leave for the vault. Ruby's silver eyes reveal that the Hound was previously a silver-eyed Faunus, before Whitley and Willow kill it by crushing it with a statue. Meanwhile, Cinder breaches the Atlas prison to free Watts, knocking Qrow, Robyn, and Jacques unconscious.
101	9	"Witch"	Paula Decanini	Eddy Rivas	February 13, 2021
Jaune, Yang, and Ren search for Oscar while Winter's forces hold off the Grimm. Oscar gains Hazel and Emerald's trust after they summon Jinn, but Neo overhears them and steals the Lamp when they leave. Winter prepares to bomb the Monstra while Emerald helps Oscar reach Jaune's group, but Salem intercepts them believing Emerald stole the Lamp. Hazel ends up protecting Emerald and reciprocating Oscar's faith by freeing the group. Though Hazel stalls Salem so everyone can escape, Oscar stays and uses his magic to attack Salem at Hazel's urging, as he sacrifices himself to hold her down.
102	10	"Ultimatum"	Connor Pickens	Kiersi Burkhart; Miles Luna	February 27, 2021
Oscar uses a massive amount of magic energy from within Ozpin's cane to destroy Monstra, Hazel and Salem. Ironwood plans to leverage Yang's team against Ruby and Penny before Salem resurrects, but is enraged to learn Winter let them go. Qrow and Robyn escape prison while Jacques is recaptured. As Watts berates Cinder, Neo messages them to help kill Ruby in exchange for the Lamp. Ruby and Yang's teams reunite, reluctantly letting Emerald stay with them as she mourns Hazel. Ironwood broadcasts an ultimatum for Penny: return to the vault in an hour or he will use the bomb to destroy Mantle.
103	11	"Risk"	Paula Decanini	Kiersi Burkhart; Miles Luna; Eddy Rivas	March 6, 2021
Marrow deserts the Ace-Ops over Ironwood's plan and Winter arrests him, while Robyn talks to Qrow about Ironwood. Jaune heals Nora and she makes up with Ren, who admits he loves her. Ruby starts to despair, after telling Yang that Summer was likely turned into a Grimm like the Hound, but is comforted by her sister. Jaune uses his Semblance to amplify Penny's Aura, temporarily stopping the virus. Ozpin reconciles with the group and Emerald officially joins their side. As Ruby considers the risk involved in surrendering Penny to Ironwood, Neo meets with Watts and Cinder.
104	12	"Creation"	Dustin Matthews	Eddy Rivas	March 13, 2021
Winter frees Marrow to help Qrow and Robyn intercept the bomb, subduing the Ace-Ops. Emerald uses her Semblance to help Jaune's team, Oscar and Winter defeat Ironwood, while Team RWBY reach the vault with Penny. Using a loophole in the relic's rules, Team RWBY save Penny from the virus by asking the spirit in the Staff, Ambrosius, to excise her robotic aspects and make Penny human. However, using the Staff releases the city of Atlas, which starts collapsing onto Mantle. To evacuate the citizens, Team RWBY has Ambrosius create inter-dimensional doors and a central location linking the two cities to Vacuo - unaware Cinder is in the crowd - and Ambrosius warns them not to fall into the void below the paths.
105	13	"Worthy"	Connor Pickens	Kiersi Burkhart; Miles Luna; Eddy Rivas	March 20, 2021
Watts hacks Atlas' broadcasts after Cinder's group use the Lamp to learn Ruby's plan. Cinder and Neo ambush Team RWBY and Penny, knocking Yang into the void. Watts frees the obstinate Ironwood, who kills Jacques and confronts Winter in the vault. Harriet escapes with Vine, but he objects to her continued intent of bombing Mantle and she throws him from their airship. Qrow and Robyn intercept Harriet, but Watts hacks the airship's autopilot to steer the bomb to Mantle. As Oscar, Nora, Ren, Emerald, and the people of Mantle enter Vacuo, they realize the gates only open one way, when Grimm cut them off in a sandstorm.
106	14	"The Final Word"	Kerry Shawcross	Kiersi Burkhart; Miles Luna; Eddy Rivas	March 27, 2021
Qrow, Vine, and Elm try to stop Harriet, but Watts remotely arms the bomb and Vine sacrifices himself to save the group. Cinder betrays Neo, and casts her, Blake, and Ruby into the void. Penny is fatally wounded by Cinder and begs Jaune to kill her, allowing her to transfer her Maiden powers to Winter, and saluting her farewell as Winter defeats Ironwood. Weiss and Jaune fall into the void, as Cinder takes both relics and dispels the doorways, leaving Winter to rejoin the survivors in Vacuo. Trapping Watts in a fire with the Staff to hide her actions, Cinder lies to a resurrected Salem that Ruby used the Lamp's last question and was killed by Neo. Declaring "checkmate" as a final parting to Ironwood, Cinder and Salem leave him and Watts to die, as Atlas crashes into Mantle's crater and causes a tsunami to flood the kingdom. In a post-credits scene, Ruby's scythe washes up on a beach near the jungle.

=== Volume 9 (2023) ===
Teaser trailer for Volume 9 of RWBY

The ninth volume premiered on February 18, 2023 and concluded on April 22, following a delay from a presumed late 2021 date, originally due to continued production slowdown amid the ongoing pandemic, in addition to production of the crossover film Justice League x RWBY: Super Heroes & Huntsmen.

The volume is the first to be released exclusively on Crunchyroll. Following a one-year period of exclusivity, it was released on the Rooster Teeth website on March 30, 2024, alongside a bonus animatic video detailing a scrapped final episode. Due to the closure of Rooster Teeth a month and a half later on May 15, it is the final volume to be produced by the company.

No. overall	No. in volume	Title	Directed by	Written by	Original release date
107	1	"A Place of Particular Concern"	Kerry Shawcross	Kerry Shawcross	February 18, 2023
After falling off the path to Vacuo, Ruby grapples with a murderous Neo before sinking into a void. Waking up on a strange beach without her weapon, Ruby journeys through a jungle and meets a talking mouse who she names "Little". Weiss and Blake reunite before both are caught in a trap laid by Little's tribe of mice, but Ruby arrives with Little and they convince the mice to relent. While searching for Yang, the group encounter a creature called the Jabberwalker, which is driven off by a pursuing Yang. Though Team RWBY is reunited, Yang is missing her artificial arm and Weiss's tearful confession that Penny died devastates Ruby, causing her to faint. As Blake looks around, she tells the team they have landed in a world resembling a fairy tale.
108	2	"Altercation at the Auspicious Auction"	Paula Decanini	Eddy Rivas	February 25, 2023
Team RWBY conclude they are in the "Ever After", a fantasy world from a story called "The Girl Who Fell Through the World", whose protagonist Alyx returned to Remnant through the Tree at its heart. Following the path, the group find a village of living toys where a raccoon, the Jinxy Peddler, auctions off items disguised by illusions - including Yang's stolen arm and Penny's glass sword; after losing the bids, Little helps the group steal the items and they escape in the ensuing riot. Learning Alyx beat the Red King at a game to progress, Ruby gives Penny's sword to the King's guards as a birthday gift to gain audience at his party, dejectedly telling the group not to bother diverging from Alyx's path, despite Blake's fears of causing a war like Alyx did.
109	3	"Rude, Red, and Royal"	Connor Pickens; Dustin Matthews	Kiersi Burkhart	March 4, 2023
Team RWBY arrive at the royal birthday party and discover the King has been succeeded by the Red Prince as ruler, who throws away Penny's sword for disliking its color. Though upset, Ruby suggests a game to placate the Prince and he elects a chess match where her friends are shrunk to serve as chess pieces, but they overpower the Prince's forces with their Semblances - terrifying the Prince and his court upon revealing some of them are humans. However, Ruby and her still-shrunken friends are pardoned by the Curious Cat, who previously helped Alyx reach the Tree, and they try to chase him down for help. Meanwhile, the Jabberwalker is cornered by a newly-arrived Neo, whose Semblance evolves to generate an army of clones.
110	4	"A Cat Most Curious"	Dustin Matthews	Miles Luna	March 11, 2023
Team RWBY join up with the Curious Cat and, in return for hearing about Remnant and Team RWBY's adventures, the Cat agrees to help undo the Red Prince's shrinking spell. Reaching a garden-like acre, the group lose track of the Cat but meet the caterpillar-like Herbalist, who engulfs them in an incense smoke-cloud where they are individually confronted by past versions of themselves. Weiss, Blake and Yang firmly refuse the vision's offers to change who they are, but Ruby falters when reminded of both her and her mother's failures to stop Salem. The Cat arrives to break Team RWBY from their trances and, after helping the Herbalist remember his purpose, he vanishes into a hole that opens up beneath it.
111	5	"The Parfait Predicament"	Paula Decanini	Kiersi Burkhart	March 18, 2023
Team RWBY follow the Curious Cat to a waterfront market for a "growgurt parfait" that will return Ruby's friends to normal size. Along the way, the Cat reveals the Herbalist was taken by the Tree as the Ever After's denizens, upon finishing their given purpose, reincarnate in a process called "ascension" unless eaten by the Jabberwalker - with the Red King becoming the Prince. While buying ingredients, Ruby encounters a Blacksmith who cryptically offers to help change who she is. When the Jabberwalker attacks the waterfront, a desperate Ruby trades her insignia for the last ingredient to restore her friends; aided by a figure known as the Rusted Knight, they defeat the Jabberwalker only to find it is one of Neo's illusions. As more Jabberwalker clones arrive, the Cat stalls them while Team RWBY retreats with the Knight, who is revealed to be a much older Jaune.
112	6	"Confessions Within Cumulonimbus Clouds"	Yssa Badiola; Kerry Shawcross	Eddy Rivas	March 25, 2023
Jaune recounts how he accidentally went back in time and became the Rusted Knight that Alyx met - along with a brother, Lewis, who was not mentioned in her story - and how Cinder took the relics to Salem, disheartening the group. A "Punderstorm" soon arrives which they must wait out or dispel by confronting their inner feelings, with Blake and Yang getting lost in it. Jaune tells Ruby and Weiss that Alyx betrayed him to reach the Tree, which absorbs and remakes things to sustain itself, and claims the Cat's duty is to provide it "sacrifices"; when accused of this, the Cat abandons them after voicing shame for trusting them or Alyx, who had promised to take the Cat to Remnant. Blake and Yang dispel the Punderstrom by confessing their feelings for each other, sharing a kiss as the group reunites. Later, Jaune returns Ruby's weapon to her, but she contemptuously locks it away.
113	7	"The Perils of Paper Houses"	Dustin Matthews	Miles Luna	April 1, 2023
Team RWBY helps Jaune save his village of "paper-pleasers" from various catastrophes. However, one villager reveals they have long completed their purpose and wish to destroy themselves so the Tree will ascend them, which Jaune prevents in the belief he is protecting them - all to make up for Penny's death. Suddenly, Neo's Jabberwalker clones attack and Ruby freezes up mid-battle, nearly getting killed before her teammates save her. Though the group drives Neo off, the fight prevents them from noticing the paper pleasers flooding the village to reincarnate. As her teammates comfort Jaune, a frustrated Ruby lectures them for failing to see her own despair. After Jaune snaps and blames her for being stranded in the Ever After, Ruby storms off with Little lugged on her.
114	8	"Tea Amidst Terrible Trouble"	Kerry Shawcross; Paula Decanini; Yssa Badiola	Miles Luna; Kiersi Burkhart	April 8, 2023
After pushing Little away in fear of their safety, Ruby discovers a mansion created by Neo's Semblance and is greeted by an illusion of Roman Torchwick, who reveals Neo blames her for his death. Neo then appears with clones of Ruby's deceased friends and enemies, who try breaking her spirit into drinking a Tree-leaf tea that will ascend her. The Curious Cat saves Ruby only to reveal their true goal of possessing her body to escape the Ever After in search of its makers, but is stopped by Little - who is in turn crushed by Neo; a disheartened Ruby drinks the tea and is taken by the Tree just as her friends arrive, who have realized that they have put too much burden on her despite their good intentions. However, feeling she has nothing to live for after getting her revenge, Neo becomes catatonic and the Cat possesses her instead. Note: This episode is dedicated to Billy Kametz who voiced Roman Torchwick during the second half of the episode.
115	9	"A Tale Involving a Tree"	Dustin Matthews; Yssa Badiola	Eddy Rivas; Kiersi Burkhart	April 15, 2023
In a flashback, Summer reads The Girl Who Fell Through the World to a sleeping Yang and Ruby. In the present, Ruby's friends see the paper-pleasers return as the genial-gems, causing Jaune to realize his fear of loss held them back. Upon resolving to accept their failings, the group are taken to the Tree to find Ruby and the Herbalist encased in wood, with the latter ascending to a butterfly. They also find the Cat at the gate to Remnant, which they cannot use since Neo has no attachment to her home anymore. The Cat then reveals the truth of Alyx & Lewis: while Lewis made it home and wrote the story, Alyx stayed out of guilt for the harm she caused and the Cat killed her for not taking them to Remnant. The Cat attacks the group so they can use Ruby to pass the gate, tricking Weiss into knocking Jaune off the Tree. Meanwhile, Ruby meets the Blacksmith in a void and the latter again offers to help change who she is, conjuring a variety of weapons - including Summer's, which Ruby reaches for.
116	10	"Of Solitude and Self"	Yssa Badiola; Dustin Matthews	Kiersi Burkhart; Eddy Rivas	April 22, 2023
Surviving his fall, Jaune uses smoke from burning Tree-leaves to reawaken Neo, driving the Curious Cat out of her. Ruby learns through a vision that Summer lied about her mission, secretly departing with Raven; though heartbroken by the deception, Ruby reconciles that she does not need to be perfect and takes back Crescent Rose, emerging from the Tree as herself. Reunited, Team RWBY defeat the Cat and Neo kills them with her Jabberwalker clones. Finally making peace with Roman's death, Neo jumps into the Tree to ascend and find a new purpose for herself while the group discover an ascended Little, now renamed Somewhat, who promises to protect the Ever After in Jaune's stead. Entering the portal, the team meets the Blacksmith - who reveals the Brother Gods were the first beings made by the Tree to build the Ever After, with the Curious Cat and Jabberwalker being their first creations, but were exiled for their endless quarreling on the nature of balance. After Jaune's youth is restored by Alyx's long-standing last wish, the Blacksmith sends Ruby and her friends back to Remnant "when they are needed most" in Vacuo, discovering the world's forces have gathered there.
117	11	"Bonus Ending Animatic"	Paula Decanini	Miles Luna; Kiersi Burkhart; Eddy Rivas	March 30, 2024
The incomplete animatics of the volume's scrapped final episode, revolving around the aftermath of the Fall of Atlas, such as people of Vacuo not quite welcoming the refugees due to the bad blood of the two kingdoms because of the Great War, as well as the prejudice against the Schnees due to their company's abusive history. The perception of the surviving heroes, Nora, Oscar, Ren, Winter, and Qrow regarding their current predicament, the events that led up to it and their attempts to make it better, it is also revealed that Ozpin and Oscar's souls are about to merge but both are resisting it as well as they can. After Salem conquered Vale, Port and Oobleck flee to Vacuo with the survivors, leaving Glynda behind. Later, it is shown that the situation is gradually improving by everyone working together and people also keeping Ruby's memory alive. After their return from the Ever After and with Raven's help, team RWBY and Jaune reach Shade academy where the armies of the world have gathered, and Qrow reveals to them that the world answered Ruby's message as they reunite with their friends.

==== RWBY Beyond (2024) ====
RWBY Beyond (also known as RWBY Volume 9: Beyond) is an animated anthology series that focuses on events that occur during and after Volume 9. The series premiered on April 13, 2024, and concluded on April 27, 2024, after four episodes. RWBY Beyond is the final RWBY production made by Rooster Teeth before the company's closure and Viz Media's acquisition of the IP.

No.	Title	Directed by	Written by	Release date
1	"Jr. Detectives"	Kerry Shawcross	Kerry Shawcross	April 13, 2024
Set after the fall of Atlas, Sun and Neptune attempt to investigate the disappearance of team RWBY and Jaune in the city of Vacuo. Acting as junior detectives, they interrogate Ren, Qrow and Nora to no avail. They later decide to gather information from Ozpin and professor Theodore, the headmaster of Shade Academy. They follow Oscar to the headmaster's office and begin eavesdropping on a conversation between the headmasters, Winter and Raven, and a mysterious hooded girl whom they speculate is the Summer Maiden, but are caught by Qrow before learning anything. The duo ends their narration by hoping that their missing friends know that the people have not given up on them.
2	"A Knight's Journal"	Eddy Rivas	Eddy Rivas	April 20, 2024
Set after team RWBY and Jaune returned to Remnant, Jaune begins writing a journal about his struggles adapting to life in Vacuo following the many years he spent as the Rusted Knight in the Ever After. Unable to connect with Nora and Ren, he meets with Oscar, who suggests that Jaune focus on his happiest memories. Jaune recounts his time around a campfire with Alyx and Lewis in the Ever After, and how they grew to idolize him after he told them stories about his life as a Huntsman. Jaune then expresses his concern for the future of Remnant and wonders how the people of Vacuo remain hopeful despite Salem's eventual invasion, before agreeing with Oscar that none of that matters during these happy moments.
3	"The Adventures of Somewhat"	Kerry Shawcross	Kerry Shawcross	April 27, 2024
Ruby narrates the journey of Somewhat (formerly known as Little) who travels with Jaune's former companion Juniper across the Ever After. They are tasked by the Blacksmith to "find what feels wrong" and first travel to the genial gem's village, where they discover that it has become a self-sustaining society since Jaune's departure. Somewhat next travels to the garden market and meets with the Butterfly (formerly known as the Herbalist) who sends Somewhat to the Crimson Keep, where the Red Prince now lives alone. The Prince challenges Somewhat to a game and is beaten, but thanks them for having someone to play with. After continuing their journey, Somewhat finds a magic mirror and recognizes the unknown figure who emerges from it.
4	"Boba"	Eddy Rivas	Eddy Rivas	April 27, 2024
Set after team RWBY and Jaune returned to Remnant, Yang and Ruby walk along the streets of Vacuo as Yang attempts to downplay a surprise she has planned. They run into a group of people who recognize Ruby, who is now famous due to her message of unity having been broadcast worldwide. The sisters later arrive at Ruby's favorite cafe, Bubba Bubba Boba, which had relocated to Vacuo from their home in Patch. They discuss the whereabouts of their father, who did not travel to Vacuo with the rest of the refugees from Vale. Yang also expresses concern for Ruby's well-being after their time in the Ever After, apologizes for her part in Ruby's breakdown and promises to share her burdens and be there for her if she gets overwhelmed.

=== Volume 10 (TBA) ===
The tenth volume is scheduled to premiere on an unspecified future date, following a lengthy writing and pre-production process while the fate of the series was in limbo due to Rooster Teeth's closure. Officially announced to be in production during Anime Expo 2026, it will be the first volume to be released by Viz Media.

== World of Remnant ==
World of Remnant is a series of short special videos detailing recurring story elements in RWBY. Each episode explains details about a specific topic and are narrated by a character from the show. The first four World of Remnant episodes were released alongside Volume 2, narrated by Jen Taylor, the "mysterious narrator" in Volume 1's first episode who is later revealed to be the primary antagonist of the series, Salem. The four episodes released alongside Volume 3 were narrated by Shannon McCormick, the voice of Professor Ozpin. The eight episodes released alongside Volume 4 were narrated by Vic Mignogna, who voiced Qrow Branwen before the conclusion of Volume 6.

=== Season 1 ===
No. overall	No. in season	Title	Original release date
WR1	1	"Dust"	August 21, 2014
The narrator explains Dust as four basic forms of a naturally occurring energy propellant, triggered by the Aura of humans and Faunus. It can be combined naturally or artificially to form stronger types, which Mankind harnessed for technology such as airships or androids. Only skilled and disciplined people can use its raw form without losing control, so the most common use of Dust is in ammunition - though some still use archaic means, like weaving it into clothing or their own body. While part of everyday life, humanity has no understanding of how it came to be - or how mankind's involvement with Dust will change Remnant.
WR2	2	"Kingdoms"	September 18, 2014
The narrator describes Remnant as a dangerous place for mankind, as many civilizations have grown and fallen over the years. In the present day, only four remain; Atlas in the north continent and Mistral in the east, while Vacuo and Vale share the largest continent. Protected by natural barriers and human tenacity, each kingdom has a governing council and their own individual militaries - some mandatory, some not. Outside the kingdom walls are roaming nomad tribes and small villages, but most fall to Grimm attacks. Each kingdom has a Huntsmen academy to train the next generations of Huntsmen to protect humanity from the Grimm. Described as beacons of hope and safe havens, the narrator claims they are the key to mankind's survival - as long as they stand united.
WR3	3	"Grimm"	October 16, 2014
The narrator details the creatures of Grimm as a destructive force that has existed throughout most of Remnant across known history. Once believed to be evil spirits, further study revealed they continued to evolve and diversify over time like animals. They attack humans and their creations first and foremost, only conflicting with wildlife for territory. Common belief is that Grimm do not need to feed; they choose to. They are drawn to negative emotions - with numbers proportionate to how far panic spreads. Captured Grimm usually break free or die quickly and their bodies evaporate shortly after their death, making study difficult. The narrator concludes that Grimm are not mindless; while younger ones are more reckless, older ones learn from their experiences to be more cautious in the future - a natural adaptation that makes them more effective killers.
WR4	4	"Aura"	December 9, 2014 (DVD/Blu-ray)
The narrator explains Huntsmen are considered Remnant's greatest warriors in large part by mastering Aura; a manifestation of the life force or soul that runs through every living being - save Grimm - but which only true warriors can amplify and control. It is primarily used for defense, sheathing the wielder in a protective force field to help survive otherwise fatal blows - though their reserves deplete with each hit until exhausted, leaving them vulnerable. Aura's second main use is by projecting it into a more tangible form known as a Semblance, providing a special power unique to each wielder such as superhuman strength or telekinesis. The narrator claims that, with enough training and focus, Aura can turn a warrior into far more than a simple man or woman. [Note: This episode was a DVD/Blu-Ray exclusive.]

=== Season 2 ===
No. overall	No. in season	Title	Original release date
WR5	1	"Vytal Festival Tournament"	October 8, 2015
Professor Ozpin explains how the multi-year Great War was ended when humanity's leaders made peace on the island of Vytal, forming new laws, traditions and the Huntsman Academies to create modern society. Among these is the Vytal Festival to celebrate the peacetime every two years, rotating between each kingdom to ensure their cultures remain open to the world. The Vytal Festival's Tournament, a keystone of the event, was designed to test the strength of the kingdom's Huntsman in a safe and friendly environment, the competition ensuring every warrior strives to be their best. As the tournament's rosters grew, the four kingdoms created the Amity Colosseum; a mobile arena that can visit any kingdom in Remnant. Ozpin notes his hopes for the established peace to continue and help humanity grow closer.
WR6	2	"Huntsmen"	November 21, 2015
Ozpin describes Huntsmen and Huntresses as the best warriors in Remnant, often outranking kingdom police and military in terms of skill but with only one goal; combat the Grimm. Each kingdom established an academy after the Great War: Beacon Academy in Vale, Haven Academy in Mistral, Shade Academy in Vacuo, and Atlas Academy in Atlas (originally Mantle). They recruit the most promising graduates from primary combat schools, grouping them in teams of four to develop communication, empathy and teamwork skills. Students are separated from kingdom allegiance while in the Academy and, upon graduating, choose their work and employers, usually via mission boards; kingdom affiliation is by choice. However, Atlas Academy is an exception, scrutinized for indoctrinating a military lifestyle upon its students, pressuring enlistment in the Military's Special Units after graduation. Ozpin states that regardless of the teaching method, the end result is the same: Huntsmen and Huntresses, ready to make their own paths. Some stay in a team, others work alone - all are expected to protect and serve humanity, never succumbing to the darkness.
WR7	3	"Cross Continental Transmit System"	December 26, 2015
Ozpin details the history of the Cross Continental Transmit System (CCTS), before which kingdoms could only communicate within their borders by radio or across borders with physical messages, the latter of which were always endangered by Grimm. Establishing relay satellites was impractical because spaceflight was impossible, as known Dust types lose their powers outside Remnant's atmosphere, so Atlas instead developed a series of four tower-housed wireless-signal hubs - one in each kingdom. While allowing an online web and communication accessible via handheld "scrolls", connectivity suffers the further one is from a kingdom, with attempts at smaller support towers suffering from Grimm attacks. Despite the benefits of global communication, Ozpin notes the system's fatal flaw is that losing even one of the towers will take down the entire network, describing it a poetic irony that Remnant's people must either speak as one or not speak at all.
WR8	4	"The Four Maidens"	January 23, 2016
Ozpin tells the tale of the Four Maidens; An old wizard living in the woods sees a maiden, Winter, waiting outside in the snow for her sisters, falling asleep from the serenity she brings. When he wakes, he sees another maiden, Spring, also waiting for her sisters and planting seeds to create a beautiful garden. The wizard watches until he hears laughter from a third waiting maiden, Summer, who convinces the wizard to step outside and embrace the world. They prepare a feast together just as the fourth sister, Fall, arrives and asks the wizard's name when he invites her. The Wizard claims he is uninteresting and has nothing to his name despite centuries of life, but Fall remarks otherwise and convinces him he has everything he needs in life. The wizard asks why they helped him with his loneliness, with Fall's answer being they would do so for anyone. Repaying their kindness, the wizard bestows his magic upon the sisters, gifting them control over the elements of nature. The sisters promise to use their gifts to aid others and to visit their friend every year. [Note: A shortened version of the tale of the Four Maidens was also told by Pyrrha Nikos (Vol. 3, Ch. 6)]

=== Season 3 ===
No. overall	No. in season	Title	Original release date
WR9	1	"Vale"	October 17, 2016
Qrow introduces Remnant, a world where towns constantly rise and fall against Grimm. Currently, the Faunus race holds the island continent of Menagerie, while the four kingdoms - Vale, Mistral, Atlas, Vacuo - are the "sweet spots" to live in. Vale, located on the northeastern end of the largest continent Sanus, is a kingdom protected by two natural barriers - mountains in the east and shallow waters on the northwest-coast, making it very defensible. The kingdom consists of Vale - its namesake main city - along with a few smaller cities along the northwest coastline. There is also the small island of Patch, off the coast across from the capital, which Qrow claims a nice place to raise a family - as Ruby and Yang were. Attempts to extend the kingdom past the mountains, such as the Mountain Glenn project, have been colossal failures. Qrow states Vale is "not half bad", as regular climate, natural barriers and serious border defense enable citizens to live their lives instead of fighting for survival, though the Fall of Beacon has now left people concerned.
WR10	2	"Mistral"	October 18, 2016
Qrow narrates the landmass to the east of Sanus as the second largest continent of Remnant, Anima, where the kingdom of Mistral is located. Mistral has the largest territory of any kingdom, home to a wide variety of ecosystems and lifestyles. Its high society is known for fashion, architecture and theater, while the lower class "has a fame of its own"; the biggest black market in Remnant where one can hire thieves, assassins and thugs of all kinds. However, all of Mistral's inhabitants have something in common: their respect for nature, especially the sea and sky. Qrow states that natural resources had an impact on Mistral's culture and technology, starting with the first settlers who found shelter in its wind-carved cliffs, from where they expanded into the land. A huge problem for its government is the kingdom's sheer size, which enables a lot of outlaws hide there—while the capital is mostly secure, other cities like Windpath and Kuchinashi are harder to govern. Qrow concludes that there are a lot of places to hide, though one has to know where to look to find certain people.
WR11	3	"Atlas"	October 19, 2016
Qrow voices a low opinion of most Atlas citizens. Both the youngest and arguably most successful kingdom, it was originally called Mantle and founded by settlers who, for unknown reasons, traveled to the northernmost continent, Solitas. The cold climate and large mountains protected settlers from Grimm - but only if they could adapt themselves, developing advanced technology faster than the rest of Remnant. The "Great War" gave Mantle another boost, as new forms of Dust application, weaponry, research and mining allowed it to expand. The territory around its combat school, Alsius, was used to build new facilities. After the "Great War", Alsius was renamed as Atlas and took in many war veterans, using New Dust technologies to enhance its grounds and secure surrounding areas. Eventually, the military, labs, research facilities and residential areas moved to Atlas as well. When the new city outgrew Mantle, the capital was moved there and the kingdom itself renamed as Atlas. Qrow remarks that while some people called it "a golden age of prosperity", the people left in Mantle felt it "the coldest winter they ever knew."
WR12	4	"Vacuo"	October 20, 2016
Qrow remarks Vacuo may be worse off than Mantle was. Located at the western end of Sanus, it was once "a paradise"- an oasis in the surrounding desert bursting with natural resources, geographical defenses and the world's largest Dust deposits. Many nomads settled a thriving lifestyle, but their society became complacent while the rest of the world had to adapt to survive. Soon, the other kingdoms set their eyes on Vacuo's resources, sparking what would be the "Great War". After years of conflict, unrestricted mining and ecological disasters, Vauco was reduced to a barren wasteland: citizens live in makeshift homes, traveling frequently in response to fleeting resources or occasional Grimm attacks. While still a kingdom, its formal government goes unheeded by citizens with Shade Academy considered the only source of order. However, its citizens still have a mutual respect for one another, following an unspoken rule: "If you can survive here, then you're welcome here." Qrow recalls how Ozpin said the four kingdoms represented what mankind is capable of when working together, lamenting that they would need Ozpin now to do so.
WR13	5	"Between Kingdoms"	20:00, November 12, 2016
Qrow narrates how areas between kingdoms are mostly populated by Grimm. Trained Huntsmen and Huntresses should be fine on the roads unless they meet large packs. Small villages and towns also dot the land, inhabited by people who either do not want to deal with life in the kingdoms, are upset with how the kingdoms are governed or simply prefer independence. If a town is founded by "smart" people, it can survive the same way the kingdoms do: with natural barriers and strong defenses - or else frequent Grimm attacks will likely destroy them within a year. Another problem is wandering bandits tribes; groups of usually-skilled fighters who prey on convoys, tending to attack and pillage weaker towns. Attacks by Grimm or bandits are usually concurrent; If a town survived a bandit attack, the lingering negative emotions may attract Grimm - and in reverse, raiders will attack towns the Grimm have weakened. Bandits never stay in one place long, as the Grimm threaten them as well. According to Qrow, almost all of Remnant has been mapped, but there are some areas from where nobody has returned alive - places where "she" (Salem) could possibly be.
WR14	6	"Faunus"	20:00, November 26, 2016
A humanoid species, notable for each having a single animalistic trait—such as cat ears. Existing at least as long as mankind, Faunus are genetically compatible with humans, though any such union will always produce Faunus children. Qrow narrates the history of Faunus and humans as full of conflicts; in ancient times, humans were afraid of Faunus and either avoided them, pushed them out of settlements or brutally hunted them. Humans began to outnumber and exploit them—such as making them cheap labor force—and the Faunus saw them as a threat. But when Grimm attacked a village in Sanus, it became a turning point as the two races united to defend their home against a shared enemy. Another milestone was after the "Great War"; Remnant was desperate for compromises and one of them involved the Faunus, who were awarded equal rights as citizens and received the island continent of Menagerie to govern for themselves. However, Qrow states this was still a bad deal for the Faunus; while they live all over Remnant, the quality of their treatment varies in different regions, with a lot of Faunus withdrawing from the kingdoms to live packed together on Menagerie. Conflicts still continue as a result, with the Faunus now organized in groups - such as the White Fang.
WR15	7	"Schnee Dust Company"	20:00, December 17, 2016
Qrow speaks negatively on the present-day Schnee Dust Company, which now holds the monopoly on the extremely valuable and important Dust products in Remnant. Its founder Nikolas Schnee, son of a Dust miner, was born in Mantle after the end of the "Great War", during the kingdom's transformative period in which it depended on others for Dust resources. Nikolas worked in the mines, went to combat school and studied. After his father's death, Nikolas used his small inheritance to fund an expedition for new Dust deposits and founded the SDC off its success. Known for quality, affordability, and trust, Nikolas personally oversaw every expedition and expansion, gaining the trust of his men and opening businesses in every kingdom. However, following years of working in Dust mines, Nikolas was forced into early retirement mostly because of health issues. A man named Jacques Gelé then married Nikolas' daughter, took on the Schnee name and convinced Nikolas that he was the "right" successor. Jacques is a "cunning businessman" whose leadership made the SDC more profitable than ever, dominating the industry - though with many questionable methods: cheap labor forces, dangerous working conditions, destroying competition and company propaganda. In Qrow's opinion, Jacques only cares about winning - and with him in charge, the future of the once-good Schnee name is uncertain.
WR16	8	"The Great War"	20:00, January 14, 2017
The "Great War" lasted around ten years, preceded by a century of tension. Mistral had conquered Anima and made an alliance with Mantle, exchanging of supplies and technology. An "incident" in Mantle led to a decree that abolished the arts and repressed self-expression, attempting to control the citizens' emotions to reduce Grimm attacks, to which Mistral partly complied when Mantle tried to enforce the decree in other kingdoms. This and other issues, such as Mistral and Mantle's treatment of citizens or maintenance of slavery, caused conflicts with Vale's citizens, resulting in a clash when Mistral tried to expand to the east coast of Sanus. The king of Vale avoided conflict, but the opposing settlers did not, their riot sparking the first battle of the "Great War". Mantle supported Mistral, with battles starting in both Anima and Sanus. Grimm attacked all combatants, sometimes forcing cease-fires between the humans to deal with the monsters. Vacuo initially stayed neutral until Mantle and Mistral tried to force their cooperation, instead supporting Vale in fear of the other side's victory. The war ended with the "Vacuo campaign", Mistral and Mantle attempting to claim Vacuo's Dust mines and cut off supplies for their enemies. The king of Vale led his and Vacuo's forces and, armed with crown, sword and scepter, he decimated the enemy army. The "deadliest battle of the war" cost many lives and created the legend of the "Warrior King". In the end, everyone bowed to the king of Vale, who refused to rule over Remnant and established the treaty of Vytal instead; territories were redistributed, slavery abolished, and governments restructured. The last king of Vale founded the Huntsmen academies and gave his most trusted followers command over them, promising to teach mankind how to fight on the condition it was not against each other; a bargain Qrow says mankind has not honored.

== Home media ==
Cinedigm released box sets for RWBY volumes 1 through 6.

Volume	Release date	Ref.
1	November 12, 2013	
2	December 9, 2014	
3	May 3, 2016	
4	June 6, 2017	
5	June 5, 2018	
6	July 2, 2019	
7	October 13, 2020	
8	November 23, 2021	
9	October 3, 2023	

In Japan, Volume 1 was released on DVD and Blu-ray by Warner Bros. Japan on December 9, 2015, with a Japanese dub. Volume 2 and 3 were released on October 26, 2016, and December 3, 2016, respectively. Volume 4 was released on October 7, 2017. In 2021, Volume 5 was released on August 25, Volume 6 on September 29, Volume 7 on October 27, and Volume 8 on December 22.
