= Baby Records =

Baby Records or Baby Record may refer to:

- Baby Records (Italy), an Italian record label
- Baby Records, record label of the Virgin Prunes
- Rourke Baby Record, a medical guideline for pediatrics

== See also ==
- Birth certificate
