= Baby John (soundtrack) =

2024 soundtrack album by Thaman S

- Soundtrack album cover

Soundtrack album by Thaman S
- Released: 14 January 2025
- Recorded: 2024
- Studio: Prasad Studios, V Studios, YRF Studios
- Genre: Feature film soundtrack
- Length: 28:06
- Language: Hindi
- Label: Zee Music Company
- Producer: Thaman S

Thaman S chronology
Rasavathi (2024)	Baby John (2025)	Game Changer (2025)

Official audio
- Baby John - Audio Jukebox on YouTube

Singles from Baby John
- 1. "Nain Matakka" Released: 25 November 2024; 2. "Pikley Pom" Released: 6 December 2024; 3. "Bandobast" Released: 14 December 2024; 4. "Hazaar Baar" Released: 19 December 2024; 5. "Beast Mode" Released: 22 December 2024

Baby John is the soundtrack album composed by Thaman S for 2024 Hindi-language action thriller film of the same name, written and directed by Kalees and produced by Atlee, Priya Atlee, Murad Khetani, and Jyoti Deshpande under Jio Studios, Cine1 Studios, and A for Apple Productions, starring Varun Dhawan, Keerthy Suresh, Wamiqa Gabbi, Zara Zyanna, and Jackie Shroff. Irshad Kamil penned the lyrics of the songs. Adviteeya Vojjala penned the Malayalam lyrics of "Pikley Pom" and Sanskrit lyrics of "Hazaar Baar". This marks Thaman's solo Hindi debut as composer. The full music album was released on 14 January 2025 by Zee Music Company.

== Development and production ==
Thaman S composed the soundtrack and the background score. Irshad Kamil penned the lyrics of the songs. Thaman will be making solo Hindi debut through this track. The production began in January 2024 and ended in September 2024. The choreography was handled by Shobi Paulraj and Brinda.

The first single "Nain Matakka" sung by Diljit Dosanjh and Dhee. The song features Varun Dhawan and Keerthy Suresh with Dosanjh and Thaman making a special appearance in the song. The song marked Dhee's maiden debut in Bollywood. Before the song announcement, Dosanjh was reported to be roped in for a party-track song on 5 November 2024 and confirmed on 21 November 2024. The song was recorded at Prasad Studios and V Studios. The filming was done in Film City, Mumbai around April 2024 and finished shooting when the film's shooting was wrapped up. "Nain Matakka" was referred to be the ultimate dance anthem, a foot tapping, peppy number, high energy party-track, and party anthem.

The second single "Pikley Pom" which was sung by Indian composer and singer Vishal Mishra and Indian child singer Riya Seepana who is daughter of Dhanunjay Seepana and marks her debut through this song. The Malayalam lyrics were penned by Adviteeya Vojjala. The Backing Vocals for Malayalam were sung by Adviteeya Vojjala, Sruthi Ranjani, Pranati, Vagdevi Sahithi Chaganti, and Rajini Keerthana. The song was recorded at Prasad Studios and V Studios. The song features Dhawan, Zara Zyanna, and Rajpal Yadav with Wamiqa Gabbi making a glimpse. The song was shot in Kerala. "Pikley Pom" was referred to be the cutest melody/song of the year.

The third single "Bandobast" featured the vocals of Mame Khan. The song features Dhawan. The song was recorded at V Studios and YRF Studios. The song was shot at a Circus in Mumbai. "Bandobast" promised to be a fun, festive song.

The fourth single "Hazaar Baar" sung by Arijit Singh and Shreya Ghoshal. The Sanskrit lyrics were penned by Vojjala and was sung by Vaikom Vijayalakshmi. The song features Dhawan and Keerthy. On 16 September through social media, Ghoshal was confirmed to lend her vocals for a romantic song. The song was recorded at Prasad Studios. On Keerthy's birthday, a motion poster was released showing Keerthy's first look and Ghoshal's vocals were featured. On social media, a photo of Dhawan and Keerthy was leaked where they were shooting the song at a beach in Mumbai. Initially, Mishra was supposed to be the lead singer of the song rendering his second song in the album but Singh replaced the former. This song marks sixteen collaboration of Singh and Ghoshal. "Hazaar Baar" promised to be the love ballad of the year.

The fifth single "Beast Mode" sung by Thaman, Raja Kumari, Vojjala, Ritesh G. Rao. After the teaser was released, American Rapper Raja Kumari was confirmed to rendered to sing the title track. The song was featured in the teaser and trailer. It features Dhawan showing a glimpse of character in the film with Jackie Shroff and Yadav.

== Release ==
The film's audio rights were acquired by Zee Music Company. Baby John's soundtrack featured five singles: "Nain Matakka", "Pikley Pom", "Bandobast", "Hazaar Baar", and "Beast Mode".

The first single "Nain Matakka" was released on 25 November. The second single "Pikley Pom" was released on 6 December. The third single "Bandobast" was released on 14 December. The fourth single "Hazaar Baar" was released on 19 December. The fifth single "Beast Mode" was released on 22 December. The full music album was released by Zee Music Company on 14 January 2025.

== Track listing ==
Track listing
No.	Title	Lyrics	Singer(s)	Length
1.	"Nain Matakka"	Irshad Kamil	Diljit Dosanjh, Dhee	3:42
2.	"Pikley Pom"	Irshad Kamil	Vishal Mishra, Riya Seepana	4:45
3.	"Bandobast"	Irshad Kamil	Thaman S, Mame Khan	4:42
4.	"Hazaar Baar"	Irshad Kamil	Arijit Singh, Shreya Ghoshal, Vaikom Vijayalakshmi	3:33
5.	"Beast Mode"	Rajakumari, Adviteeya Vojjala, Ritesh G. Rao	Rajakumari	4:18
6.	"Godh Bharai"	Irshad Kamil	Saindhavi	2:59
7.	"Chanda Re"	Abhiruchi Chand	Jyoti Nooran	4:29
Total length:				28:06
