= Babes in Toyland =

Babes in Toyland may refer to:

- Babes in Toyland (operetta), a 1903 operetta by Victor Herbert
- Babes in Toyland (1934 film), a musical comedy starring Laurel and Hardy, based on the Victor Herbert operetta
- Babes in Toyland (TV special), a 1954–1955 TV special directed by Max Liebman, starring Dennis Day with Jo Sullivan (1954) and Barbara Cook (1954)
- Babes in Toyland (1961 film), a Disney musical starring Ray Bolger, Annette Funicello and Tommy Sands, again based on the Victor Herbert operetta
  - Babes in Toyland (soundtrack), the soundtrack album from the 1961 film
- Babes in Toyland (1986 film), a television movie starring Drew Barrymore and Keanu Reeves, using only two songs from the Victor Herbert operetta
- Babes in Toyland (1997 film), an animated film featuring the voices of Christopher Plummer, Joey Ashton and Lacey Chabert, using only one musical number from the Victor Herbert operetta
- Babes in Toyland (band), an American punk rock band

== See also ==
- Babeland, an American sex toy boutique formerly called Toys in Babeland
- Toyland (disambiguation)
