= Babies (American TV series) =

2020 American documentary television series

- Genre: Documentary
- Country of origin: United States
- Original language: English
- No. of seasons: 1 (2 parts)
- No. of episodes: 12

Production
- Executive producer: Jane Root
- Running time: 49–52 minutes

Original release
- Network: Netflix
- Release: February 21, 2020

Babies is a 2020 American documentary television series. The premise revolves around 15 families around the world during the first year of the life of their babies.

== Episodes ==
Series overview
Season	Episodes	Originally released
Part 1	6	February 21, 2020
Part 2	6	June 19, 2020

No. overall	No. in season	Title	Original release date
Part 1
1	1	"Love"	February 21, 2020
The biology of bonding unravels to reveal how caregiving, social interaction and stress can physically change both parent and newborn.
2	2	"First Food"	February 21, 2020
Proving babies truly are what they eat, researchers discuss how breast milk, iron and microbes can enrich, nourish and protect offspring.
3	3	"Crawling"	February 21, 2020
From how they grow to how they go, three scientists find out that crawling is much more than just a transitional phase.
4	4	"First Words"	February 21, 2020
Experts examine the rhythm and flow of language and explore how babies break down linguistic beats before they know how to speak.
5	5	"Sleep"	February 21, 2020
Researchers delve into sleep, a dynamic time for babies, with studies on twitching, apps and naps.
6	6	"First Steps"	February 21, 2020
Scientists venture into the ways that walking changes a baby's world and unveil findings on neonatal reflexes, skeletal development and talking.
Part 2
7	1	"What Babies Know"	June 19, 2020
Challenging the notion of a blank slate, three studies explore how babies are born with expectations about everyday life.
8	2	"Movement"	June 19, 2020
From curiosity to understanding: researchers unveil the surprising ways that infants learn how to anticipate and respond to the movements of others.
9	3	"Senses"	June 19, 2020
Several experts make sense of how babies touch, taste and see as they embark on a sensory journey that will shape the rest of their lives.
10	4	"Relationships"	June 19, 2020
A coy smile, a puppet show and a pointed finger lead to discoveries in how babies get along with others using humor, morality and shared experiences.
11	5	"Nature and Nurture"	June 19, 2020
Resolving the debate of nature versus nurture, three scientists show how genetics and environment work together as infants discover who they are.
12	6	"Toddlers"	June 19, 2020
Researchers reveal the social skills that toddlers naturally possess, abilities that ultimately separate humans from all other species.

== Release ==
Part 1 of Babies was released on February 21, 2020, on Netflix. Part 2 was released on June 19, 2020.
