= List of animated series with LGBTQ characters: 2010–2014 =

The years of 2010 to 2014 saw LGBTQ characters premiere in various animated series, part of the decade that changed animation going forward. This included characters prominently featured in Adventure Time, My Little Pony: Friendship is Magic, Young Justice, The Awesomes, Steven Universe, RWBY, and BoJack Horseman. On the other hand, Yuri Seijin Naoko-san, Mayo Chiki!, Wandering Son, and YuruYuri were among the anime series with LGBTQ characters. These stories set the stage for those to come in the later part of the decade, 2015–2019.

This list only includes recurring characters, otherwise known as supporting characters, which appear frequently from time to time during the series' run, often playing major roles in more than one episode, and those in the main cast are listed below. LGBTQ characters which are guest stars or one-off characters are listed on the pages focusing exclusively on gay, lesbian, non-binary, and bisexual animated characters, and on pages listing fictional trans, pansexual, asexual, and intersex characters.

The entries on this page are organized alphanumerically by duration dates and then alphabetically by the first letter of a specific series.

== 2010 ==
Duration	Show title	Character debut date	Characters	Identity	Notes	Country
2010	Chu-Bra!!	January 4, 2010	Haruka Shiraishi	Lesbian	Haruka appears to have romantic feelings for Nayu, leading some to suspect her of being a lesbian, most especially because of her huge disliking to most males who mock/objectify her bust size.	Japan
2010	MM!	October 9, 2010	Yumi Mamiya	Bisexual	She hates Taro and loves Tatsukichi, but does not know that Tatsukichi is a cross-dresser, and in other scenes, it is implied that she has lesbian tendencies when groping and fondling Arashiko and Mio.	Japan
2010	The Betrayal Knows My Name	April 11, 2010	Yuzuki "Yuki" Giou (Sakurai)	Gay	Yuzuki's previous incarnation was a woman named Yuki, who was in love with a man named Luka. In the present, Yuki, now in a male form, is highly protective of Luka, and vice versa, with both highly protective of each other, with implied romantic ties between them.	Japan
2010	The Betrayal Knows My Name	April 11, 2010	Zess (Luka Corosszeira)	Bisexual	Yuzuki's previous incarnation was a woman named Yuki, who was in love with a man named Luka. In the present, Yuki, now in a male form, is highly protective of Luka, and vice versa, with both highly protective of each other, with implied romantic ties between them.	Japan
2010–2012	Kuttsukiboshi	August 16, 2010	Kiiko Kawakami	Lesbian	Kiiko is in love with Aaya, but didn't have the courage to tell her in the beginning of the summer vacation, while Aaya likes to perform experiments with Kiiko's powers, although, actually, she is in love with her. She usually takes the lead when it comes to activities and has an outgoing personality. Aaya's older brother, Kōta Saitō had a terminal disease and manipulated Aaya into having sex with him before going in for his operation where he died, as shown in the second episode.	Japan
2010–2012	Kuttsukiboshi	August 16, 2010	Aaya Saitō	Bisexual	Kiiko is in love with Aaya, but didn't have the courage to tell her in the beginning of the summer vacation, while Aaya likes to perform experiments with Kiiko's powers, although, actually, she is in love with her. She usually takes the lead when it comes to activities and has an outgoing personality. Aaya's older brother, Kōta Saitō had a terminal disease and manipulated Aaya into having sex with him before going in for his operation where he died, as shown in the second episode.	Japan
2010–2012	Yuri Seijin Naoko-san	December 10, 2010	Naoko-san	Lesbian	Naoko-san is an alien who comes from the Planet Yuri and takes the place of Misuzu's sister. She appears to solely have a romantic/sexual attraction to little girls. She also seeks to conquer the world by 'yurifying' it. In the manga, her depiction as a "yurian" is in reality a metaphor for "lesbian".	Japan
2010–2012	Yuri Seijin Naoko-san	December 10, 2010	Hii-chan	Lesbian	She is Misuzu's best friend who wears glasses. In the 2010 OVA, while Naoko-san discusses about erotic magazines, Hii-chan overhears and fantasizes a scenario with herself and Misuzu. In the following OVA, she's revealed to be harboring a deranged crush on Misuzu.	Japan
2010–2013	Scooby Doo! Mystery Incorporated	April 5, 2010	Velma Dinkley	Lesbian	The producer of this series, Tony Cervone, confirmed that Velma is a lesbian while James Gunn, who wrote the screenplays of Scooby-Doo and Scooby-Doo 2: Monsters Unleashed, said she was "explicitly gay". She has feelings for Marcie "Hot Dog Water" Fleach. Velma also appeared in Scooby-Doo, Where Are You!, Shaggy & Scooby-Doo Get a Clue!, and What's New, Scooby-Doo?.	United States
2010–2014	Squid Girl	October 11, 2010	Sanae Nagatsuki	Lesbian	She is Eiko's classmate and neighborhood friend who develops an obsessive crush on Squid Girl, otherwise known as Ika. She keeps a vast collection of Squid Girl photographs and memorabilia, and often stalks her. Although Squid Girl often retaliates violently to her advances, she enjoys it.	Japan
2010–2018	Adventure Time	April 5, 2010	Marceline "Marcy" Abadeer	Bisexual	Marcy is bisexual as she dated a male wizard named Ash, and in the series finale, shared an on-screen kiss with Bonnie, confirming their relationship. The latter had been hinted at and subtle since the episode "What Was Missing", leading fans to ship these characters. Additionally, Marcy's VA, Olivia Olson confirmed that Marcy and Bonnie had dated and an episode of Adventure Time: Distant Lands, "Obsidian", shines a light on Marcy and Bonnie's relationship. While Bonnie seems to have dated a male character named Mr. Cream Puff, her exact sexuality, unlike Marcy's, has not been confirmed. As such, reviewers have argued she is either bisexual, non-binary, queer, lesbian, or a combination of some of the latter, as both live in a world where "sexuality is somewhat fluid". They both appeared in Adventure Time: Distant Lands episode "Obsidian", Adventure Time: Fionna and Cake, Adventure Time: Side Quests and will be the main protagoinists of Adventure Time: Bubblegum & Marceline.	United States
2010–2018	Adventure Time	May 17, 2010	Princess Bonnibel "Bonnie" Bubblegum	Queer		United States
2010–2018	Adventure Time	April 26, 2010	BMO	Ambiguous	BMO is neither male nor female. In the show both the pronoun "he" and the term "m'lady" have been used in reference to BMO. While BMO is an object used for recreation by Finn and Jake, BMO is still considered a close friend and treated as an equal by the two. BMO speaks English with a Korean accent. BMO appeared in Adventure Time: Distant Lands and Adventure Time: Fionna and Cake. BMO will also have a preschool spinoff series Heyo BMO.	United States
2010–2019	My Little Pony: Friendship Is Magic	October 10, 2010	Lyra Heartstrings	Lesbian	The two propose to one another in the season 9 episode "The Big Mac Question", and in the series finale, "The Last Problem", they are shown as married in a newspaper clipping.	United States
2010–2019	My Little Pony: Friendship Is Magic	October 10, 2010	Sweetie Drops	Lesbian	The two propose to one another in the season 9 episode "The Big Mac Question", and in the series finale, "The Last Problem", they are shown as married in a newspaper clipping.	United States
2010–2019	My Little Pony: Friendship Is Magic	June 15, 2019	Aunt Holiday	Lesbian	Aunt Holiday and Auntie Lofty are aunts to the young pegasus Scootaloo and are her guardians while Scootaloo's parents are away. The pair had first been introduced in storybooks based on the series, but were fully introduced in a ninth-season episode, "The Last Crusade". The pair were identified as a lesbian couple by one of the showrunners, Michael Vogel. According to Vogel, he and writers Nicole Dubuc and Josh Haber agreed to establish the two in their first appearance in the book as a lesbian couple, though without explicitly stating as such, so that they could establish this within the shown itself. Vogel stated they felt they could show that what elements make up a family is only determined by love, and not traditional roles.	United States
2010–2019	My Little Pony: Friendship Is Magic	June 15, 2019	Auntie Lofty	Lesbian		United States
2010–2022	Young Justice	November 26, 2010	Kaldur'ahm	Polysexual	Kaldur'ahm is introduced as Aquaman's protege and leader of The Team. In season 1, he has an unrequited crush on Tula, and in Young Justice: Outsiders, he is in a relationship with Wyynde. Greg Weisman has stated Kaldur'ahm currently considers himself to be polysexual, but is not a "ladies' man".	United States
2010–2022	Young Justice	November 26, 2010	Marie Logan	Bisexual or Lesbian	Marie Logan is introduced in the first season as the mother of Garfield Logan / Beast Boy. In a tie-in comic, Queen Bee uses her control of pheromones to enthrall Marie, with her abilities only working on people that are sexually attracted to women. This means that Marie was either a lesbian or bisexual and was able to be affected because of her sexuality.	United States
2010–2022	Young Justice	March 4, 2011	La'gaan	Bisexual or Pansexual	La'gaan first appeared in season 1. He was a member of the Team in season 2 and was in a relationship with M'gann M'orzz / Miss Martian. He returns in Young Justice: Phantoms where he is revealed to be bisexual and shown to be in a polyamorous marriage to a man and a woman with a child.	United States
2010–2022	Young Justice	March 4, 2011	Rodunn	Bisexual or Pansexual	An Atlantean who first appeared in season 1. Rodunn is one of La'gaan's two romantic partners.	United States
2010–2022	Young Justice	May 26, 2012	Eduardo "Ed" Dorado Jr	Gay	Eduardo "Ed" Dorado Jr was part of the Runaways, a group of teenage metahumans. He eventually quit and joined the Outsiders. There are implications that Ed has feelings for Bart Allen. Greg Weisman confirmed that Ed is gay.	United States
2010–2022	Young Justice	June 2, 2012	Bart Allen	Gay	Ed and Bart Allen are in a relationship.	United States
2010–2022	Young Justice	January 4, 2019	Violet Harper	Non-binary	Violet Harper, also known as Halo, is the soul of a sentient technology known as a Mother Box that entered the body of Gabrielle Daou. Though the sex of their body is female, Halo does not identify as male or female as defined in Earth language as shown in the episode "Influence", while intensely kissed Harper Row in the episode "Early Warning". In the episode "Nautical Twilight", it is revealed Halo identifies as non-binary and prefers they/them pronouns. Rocket and the New Gods used feminine pronouns for Halo in the episode "Forbidden Secrets of Civilizations Past!" though this was a writing mistake according to Greg Weisman. They still had unresolved feelings for Geo-Force, but realized that he wouldn't change. Halo then started to reconsider their feelings for Harper. Halo entered into a relationship with Harper in the season four finale "Death and Rebirth".	United States
2010–2022	Young Justice	July 9, 2019	Wyynde	Gay	Wyynde is an Atlantean and in a relationship with Kaldur'ahm, otherwise known as Aquaman. Wynnde and Aquaman share a kiss in the episode "Quiet Conversations". Greg Weisman, a producer of Young Justice, said that Kaldur has been in love with Wyynde and Tula, his childhood friend and crush, while dating Rocket, the last two of which are women.	United States
2010–2022	Young Justice	January 25, 2019	Harper Row	Bisexual	Harper Row is a bisexual friend of Violet Harper and Fred Bugg. In one episode, "Early Warning", she drunkenly kissed Violet while she had a boyfriend named Jack, just like Violet, whose boyfriend is Geo-Force (also known as Brion Markov), until the episode "Nevermore". She is also bisexual in the comics. In Season 4, Harper broke up with her boyfriend and confessed her feelings to Halo. Harper entered into a relationship with Halo in the season four finale "Death and Rebirth".	United States
2010–2022	Young Justice	August 13, 2019	Rosa	Trans woman	Rosa, also known as Fury, is a member of Lex Luthor's Infinity, Inc. She is based on the Erik Storn incarnation of the character. In June 2022, Greg Weisman confirmed that Rosa is transgender when he retweeted from a fan. Rosa is voiced by transgender actress Quei Tann.	United States

== 2011 ==
Duration	Show title	Character debut date	Characters	Identity	Notes	Country
2011	Allen Gregory	October 30, 2011	Richard De Longpre	Gay	Richard and Jeremy are the fathers of the title character. Jeremy is a former social worker who had a loving wife and family, although this changed after Richard became one of his clients. Richard was attracted to Jeremy to the point where he started stalking him and his family until Jeremy finally agreed to be his husband. Jeremy left his wife and children for Richard, who offered him an easy, no-maintenance life as his trophy husband	United States
2011	Allen Gregory	October 30, 2011	Jeremy De Longpre	Bisexual	Richard and Jeremy are the fathers of the title character. Jeremy is a former social worker who had a loving wife and family, although this changed after Richard became one of his clients. Richard was attracted to Jeremy to the point where he started stalking him and his family until Jeremy finally agreed to be his husband. Jeremy left his wife and children for Richard, who offered him an easy, no-maintenance life as his trophy husband	United States
2011	Battle Girls: Time Paradox	April 5, 2011	Akechi Mitsuhide	Lesbian	Nobunaga's humble aide, who is often bemused at her acceptance of Hideyoshi's odd behavior and is secretly infatuated with Nobunaga. To this end, she is prepared to do whatever it takes to "make Nobunaga happy", which is why she is willing to acquire the Crimson Armor set on her feudal lord's behalf. Sub-consequently, she is also jealous, at times, with Hide's interactions with Nobunaga.	Japan
2011	Ben-To	October 23, 2011	Ume Shiraume	Lesbian	She is obsessed with Hana and usually beats Yō up out of jealousy, despite also being prone to flirt with other girls like Ayame as shown in the third, fourth, and ninth episodes.	Japan
2011	Mayo Chiki!	July 7, 2011	Kanade Suzutsuki	Bisexual	She notes that Kinjirō is the first, and only, man who is willing to talk her down and she has fallen in love with him as a result. She is also implied to be a bisexual as she has claimed that Subaru was her first love.	Japan
2011	Mayo Chiki!	July 7, 2011	Kureha Sakamachi	Lesbian	Kureha, Jiro's younger sister, has a crush on Suburu, which makes her jealous of Jiro's relation with Suburu. Usami gets hit on by Kureha in episode 6, "Let the War Begin", embarrassing Jiro, with Usami agreeing with Jiro's explanation that her and Kureha are "pretty good friends. She is "paid" by Nakuru in the episode "Please Massage Them!", when helping her with her new graphic novel by giving her photographs of Subaru, which she goes wild over.	Japan
2011	Mayo Chiki!	August 4, 2011	Masamune Usami	Bisexual	Masamune has a crush on Suburu and blackmails Jiro into a date at the school festival in the episode "Go Out With Me". By the end of the 6th episode, "Let the War Begin", Jiro and Masamune have become good friends. In later episodes, like "I'm Going on A Journey" and "Nyu!" she expresses feelings for Jiro and Suburu.	Japan
2011	Puella Magi Madoka Magica	January 7, 2011	Madoka Kaname	Ambiguous	In the series, Madoka and Homura explore love and magical girls. Kevin Cooley argues that Homura's powers are not merely a "metaphor for love between magical girls", but "literally are the love between magical girls" and that Madoka's actions create a world "where love between women can prosper free from Kyubey's policing". However, when asked if Homura is in love with Madoka, Gen Urobuchi replied, "probably", saying that it is "a really strong friendship turns into a lovelike-relationship without the sexual attraction". Akiyuki Shinbo stated that, in the Rebellion film, Homura's love for Madoka is greater than romance—a feeling of friendship. These comments imply that they are drawn to each other in an aromantic way, with platonic love, and may be asexual.	Japan
2011	Puella Magi Madoka Magica	January 7, 2011	Homura Akemi	Ambiguous		Japan
2011	R-15	August 7, 2011	Ran Musen	Lesbian	Ran, a talented programmer, who loves "girl-on girl erotica" and has a fan club of "younger sisters", is also shown to be only interested in girls and hates Taketo. This changes after Taketo helps rescue Fukune from Beni Botan in the episode "Only Girls". She then befriends Taketo soon after.	Japan
2011	The World's Greatest First Love	March 22, 2011	Shouta Kisa	Gay	Shouta Kisa has a bad habit of falling for good-looking men and falls for Kou, but is scared to pursue a relationship as he feels love doesn't really exist. Kou dated women in the past but later falls in love with Shouta and the two develop a strong romantic relationship.	Japan
2011	The World's Greatest First Love	March 22, 2011	Kou Yukina	Bisexual	Shouta Kisa has a bad habit of falling for good-looking men and falls for Kou, but is scared to pursue a relationship as he feels love doesn't really exist. Kou dated women in the past but later falls in love with Shouta and the two develop a strong romantic relationship.	Japan
2011	The World's Greatest First Love	May 7, 2011	Yoshiyuki Hatori	Bisexual	Yoshiyuki has been friends with Chiaki for a long time and the two eventually start dating, as shown in the OVA, "The Case of Hatori Yoshiyuki". Hatori had a previous girlfriend in the past as shown in the episode "Delay in love is dangerous".	Japan
2011	The World's Greatest First Love	May 7, 2011	Chiaki Yoshino	Gay	Yoshiyuki has been friends with Chiaki for a long time and the two eventually start dating, as shown in the OVA, "The Case of Hatori Yoshiyuki". Hatori had a previous girlfriend in the past as shown in the episode "Delay in love is dangerous".	Japan
2011	The World's Greatest First Love	May 7, 2011	Yuu Yanase	Gay	Yanase is the chief assistant of Yoshino, who falls in love with Hatori.	Japan
2011	The World's Greatest First Love	May 21, 2011	Takafumi Yokozawa	Bisexual	Takafumi claims to have liked women in the past, but fell in love with Masamune Takano who did not reciprocate his feelings. He later enters a relationship with Zen Kirishima, who was once happily married until his wife tragically passed as shown in the episode "Actions Speak Louder Than Words", as shown in the movie connected to the franchise.	Japan
2011	The World's Greatest First Love	May 21, 2011	Zen Kirishima	Bisexual	Takafumi claims to have liked women in the past, but fell in love with Masamune Takano who did not reciprocate his feelings. He later enters a relationship with Zen Kirishima, who was once happily married until his wife tragically passed as shown in the episode "Actions Speak Louder Than Words", as shown in the movie connected to the franchise.	Japan
2011	Tiger & Bunny	May 8, 2011	Nathan Seymour (Fire Emblem)	Genderqueer	Nathan is a highly effeminate homosexual man who identifies as genderqueer though he prefers to be identified as a woman at times. He often spends more time with the female heroes while flirting with the male heroes. In the past, they tried to present themselves femininely but was harshly criticized, and they still hold a strong romantic infatuation towards men.	Japan
2011	Tiger & Bunny	May 8, 2011	Nathan Seymour (Fire Emblem)	Gay	Nathan is a highly effeminate homosexual man who identifies as genderqueer though he prefers to be identified as a woman at times. He often spends more time with the female heroes while flirting with the male heroes. In the past, they tried to present themselves femininely but was harshly criticized, and they still hold a strong romantic infatuation towards men.	Japan
2011	Wandering Son	January 13, 2011	Shuichi Nitori	Lesbian trans woman	Shuichi Nitori, otherwise known by Shu (シュウ, Shū) and Nitorin (にとりん), is a lesbian transgender woman and often dresses to assume the role of the female gender, and is often described as cute, able to appear as a girl while cross-dressing, which is encouraged by their friends Yoshino Takatsuki and Saori Chiba. Later on, they exhibit signs of gender dysphoria and displays an outward attraction to two characters in the series—Yoshino, a transgender man, and their female classmate, Anna Suehiro. The latter date for a short time, until the relationship, is broken off, and later resumed.	Japan
2011	Wandering Son	January 13, 2011	Yoshino Takatsuki	Genderqueer	Yoshino Takatsuki is a student in Shuichi's class, also known as Takatsuki-kun (高槻くん) by their classmates, is often seen as a girl, but wants to be a boy, often refraining from dressing in traditionally feminine clothes. He is attracted toward Shuichi and Saori, while he also experiences signs of gender dysphoria.	Japan
2011	Wandering Son	January 20, 2011	Makoto Ariga	Straight trans woman	Makoto, known as Mako for short, was assigned male at birth like Shuichi, expressing a desire to be a straight trans woman primarily due to her love of men and crossdressing like Shuichi. She even dreams of entering into a relationship with a cool adult man.	Japan
2011	Wandering Son	February 3, 2011	Anna Suehiro	Bisexual	She develops feelings for Shuichi as a boy, and disapproves of his crossdressing at first, but later declares that she does not mind if she is "considered a lesbian" if Shuichi comes out as a transgender woman as shown in episodes such as "Rosy Cheeks ~Growing pains~" and "10 + 11 ~Better half~". She also is well-known and experienced as a teenage model, often being outspoken, while also liking to modify the clothes she buys.	Japan
2011	Wandering Son	February 3, 2011	Hiroyuki Yoshida	Straight trans woman	Hiroyuki, known as "Yuki" for short, is a tall and attractive straight trans woman who lives with her boyfriend Shiina and runs a gay bar. She takes an early interest in Yoshino, whom she remains on good terms with after learning of their assigned sex, even giving Yoshino and Shuichi helpful advice when troubled. Due to her transition, she has not been on good terms with her parents, who run a uniform store as shown in the episode "Cool Girlfriend ~Green eye~".	Japan
2011–2012	Horizon in the Middle of Nowhere	October 15, 2011	Naito Margot	Lesbian	Naito and Malga are lovers which makes the two lesbian witches in open rebellion against the Catholic Church, indicated in episodes like "Commandos in Town".	Japan
2011–2012	Horizon in the Middle of Nowhere	October 15, 2011	Malga Naruze	Lesbian	Naito and Malga are lovers which makes the two lesbian witches in open rebellion against the Catholic Church, indicated in episodes like "Commandos in Town".	Japan
2011–2014	Hunter x Hunter	July 16, 2014	Alluka Zoldyck	Trans woman	Even though different characters refer to Alluka with male pronouns, she is still primarily referred to and exclusively uses feminine terms and pronouns throughout the series.	Japan
2011–2014	Maken-ki!	November 16, 2011	Syria Ootsuka	Gay or Trans woman	She is a Defense Member of Venus, and an idol celebrity from America. In S1 Ep8, while at Tenbi, she flirts openly with Takeru, and makes the other girls jealous. When she fights Inaho, she uses professional wrestler moves. At some point during season 2, when Takeru uses his Overblow ability, Syria loses her Inverse power, and is revealed to be an okama guy. Despite the defeat, Syria still pursues Takeru and gives him a kiss.	Japan
2011–2019	YuruYuri	July 5, 2011	Chinatsu Yoshikawa	Lesbian	Although the work is rather ambiguous about the orientation of main girls, Chinatsu is the one who has a confirmed crush on another girl.	Japan
2011–2019	YuruYuri	July 12, 2011	Chitose Ikeda	Lesbian	Chitose and her twin sister, Chizuru have various yuri fantasies whenever they take their glasses off, with Chitose almost always pairing Kyōko together with Ayano, which often leads to near-fatal nosebleeds while Chizuru pairs Ayano with Chitose and drools instead of having nosebleeds. Whenever Chitose gets drunk (or eats chocolate in the anime), she goes on a kissing rampage.	Japan
2011–2019	YuruYuri	July 12, 2011	Chizuru Ikeda	Lesbian	Chitose and her twin sister, Chizuru have various yuri fantasies whenever they take their glasses off, with Chitose almost always pairing Kyōko together with Ayano, which often leads to near-fatal nosebleeds while Chizuru pairs Ayano with Chitose and drools instead of having nosebleeds. Whenever Chitose gets drunk (or eats chocolate in the anime), she goes on a kissing rampage.	Japan
2011–2019	YuruYuri	July 12, 2011	Ayano Sugiura	Lesbian	Ayano is in love with Kyouko but is often not too honest with her feelings for her, always referring to her by her full name and treating her with acts of hostility, despite not wanting do so on purpose.	Japan
2011–2019	YuruYuri	August 13, 2012	Akane Akaza	Lesbian	Akari's older sister. She is secretly infatuated with Akari, with her room almost completely covered in photos of her, often doing various perverted things with her belongings when she is not around and reading lots of doujins about sisterly incest as shown in the episode "Sisterly Relations and Such".	Japan
2011–2019	YuruYuri	August 13, 2012	Nadeshiko Ohmuro	Lesbian	Sakurako's older sister who is eighteen years old. She is in a romantic relationship with one of her friends, though it has not yet been revealed who.	Japan
2011–2019	YuruYuri	August 13, 2012	Tomoko Yoshikawa	Lesbian	Chinatsu's older sister. She's a friend of Akane and has strong feelings for her.	Japan
2011–present	Bob's Burgers	March 6, 2011	Cha-Cha	Trans woman	Cha-Cha is a transgender sex worker who first appears in the episode, "Sheesh! Cab, Bob?".	United States
2011–present	Bob's Burgers	March 6, 2011	Marbles	Trans woman	Marbles is a trans female sex worker who first appears in the episode "Sheesh! Cab, Bob?" and describes pursuing sex reassignment surgery.	United States
2011–present	Bob's Burgers	March 6, 2011	Marshmallow	Trans woman	Marshmallow is a trans female sex worker. In June 2020, the show's creator committed to having Marshmallow voiced by a Black LGBTQ actor rather than David Herman. Marshmallow has currently been voiced by transgender actress Jari Jones since season 14.	United States
2011–present	Bob's Burgers	January 14, 2018	Nat Kinkle	Lesbian	Nat is a limousine driver who drives Linda, Tina and Louise around in her limousine in "V for Valentine-detta". In "Just the Trip", she invited the Belchers on a road trip to drop off Steve, her pet snake at her ex-girlfriend's animal sanctuary.	United States

== 2012 ==
Duration	Show title	Character debut date	Characters	Identity	Notes	Country
2012	Aesthetica of a Rogue Hero	July 13, 2012	Chikage Izumi	Lesbian	She is a friendly, tomboyish girl with short brown hair and amber eyes. She becomes friends with Miu immediately. She is also a lesbian, and shamelessly admits it, though she develops a slight "liking" for Akatsuki, shown in episodes like "Holy Water Bond".	Japan
2012	Bodacious Space Pirates	January 29, 2012	Jenny Dolittle	Lesbian	The two are not only president and vice president of the Space Yacht Club but are also lesbian lovers, as revealed in the middle of the show. Both Jenny and Lynn reappear in the 2014 film which followed the series, titled Bodacious Space Pirates: Abyss of Hyperspace.	Japan
2012	Bodacious Space Pirates	February 5, 2012	Lynn Lambretta	Lesbian	The two are not only president and vice president of the Space Yacht Club but are also lesbian lovers, as revealed in the middle of the show. Both Jenny and Lynn reappear in the 2014 film which followed the series, titled Bodacious Space Pirates: Abyss of Hyperspace.	Japan
2012	Brave 10	January 22, 2012	Kamanosuke Yuri	Ambiguous	Their exact gender is unknown but on occasion is referenced as male, shown in the episode "Valley of Whirlwinds". Nonetheless, they develop a romantic interest in Saizo.	Japan
2012	Inu x Boku SS	January 19, 2012	Nobara Yukinokōji	Lesbian	She holds a primary sexual interest in young cute girls as shown in the episode "The Real Contract", with some calling her a "predatory lesbian".	Japan
2012	Lupin the Third: The Woman Called Fujiko Mine	April 4, 2012	Lieutenant Oscar	Ambiguous	Oscar is an androgynous male character who has a key role in the anime.	Japan
2012–2013	Ixion Saga DT	November 3, 2012	Mariandale	Trans woman	A transsexual maid who wields pistols akimbo and protects the princess. She admits being jealous of the princess getting married. Occasionally, she will revert to her male voice.	Japan
2012–2014	The High Fructose Adventures of Annoying Orange	May 28, 2012	Marshmallow	Non-binary	Marshmallow is one of Annoying Orange's friends. On June 17, 2022, Marshmallow was confirmed to be non-binary. Marshmallow is voiced by creator Dane Boedigheimer who is transgender and non-binary.	United States
2012–2014	The Legend of Korra	April 14, 2012	Korra	Bisexual	In The Legend of Korra, both Korra and Asami are romantically involved with Mako at different points. The series finale, "The Last Stand", ended with Korra and Asami holding hands and looking into each other's eyes while traveling through a portal right before the ending credits. The creators later confirmed that the intention of the ending scene was to show Asami and Korra becoming a romantic couple. In the graphic novel The Legend of Korra: Turf Wars, which is the sequel to the animated series, Korra and Asami are in a relationship, and kiss one another. In Avatar: Seven Havens, it is revealed Korra and Asami eventually got married, and spent being happily together for the rest of their lives before the cataclysm. Korra is voiced by bisexual actress Janet Varney.	United States
2012–2014	The Legend of Korra	April 28, 2012	Asami Sato	Bisexual		United States
2012–2014	The Legend of Korra	June 23, 2012	Kyoshi	Bisexual	Michael Dante DiMartino, one of the series creators, in an interview with EW, noted that while the show's crew had always believed she was bisexual, her feelings toward women and men were actually only explored in the young adult novel and in the comics branching off of the series.	United States
2012–2014	The Legend of Korra	September 13, 2013	Kya	Lesbian	Kya is Aang's daughter who appears in The Legend of Korra. Her sexuality is not mentioned in the animated series, but in the sequel graphic novel The Legend of Korra: Turf Wars, she is shown to be lesbian and gives advice to Korra and Asami about coming out.	United States
2012–2015	Brickleberry	October 9, 2012	Constance Beatrice "Connie" Cunaman	Lesbian	Connie admits she is a lesbian. It is revealed to the viewers that she dubs her strength "lesbian strength" as shown in the episode "Gay Bomb". She is obsessed with Ethel, and was turned away by her Evangelical parents for being a homosexual.	United States
2012–2016	Gravity Falls	June 29, 2012	Sheriff Blubs	Gay	In the series finale, the two men publicly express their love for each other, confirming their romantic relationship.	United States
2012–2016	Gravity Falls	June 29, 2012	Deputy Durland	Gay	In the series finale, the two men publicly express their love for each other, confirming their romantic relationship.	United States
2012–2018	Bravest Warriors	January 20, 2013	Plum	Bisexual	She seems to have a crush on Chris, kissing him multiple times during the show in the episodes "Gas-Powered Stick", "Hamster Priest" and "Merewif Tag", even as she rejects advances from Danny and Wallow in the episode "Mexican Touchdown". She is also madly in love with her doppelganger as shown in the comics, which is seemingly canon while she kisses Peach in another comic. Furthermore, on numerous occasions, she has identified as bisexual, which was confirmed by Kate Leth, who wrote all three volumes of the Bravest Warriors comic.	
2012–2018	Bravest Warriors	January 20, 2013	Plum	Bisexual		Canada
2012–2018	DreamWorks Dragons	March 23, 2012	Gobber	Gay	The blacksmith of Berk, Stoick's closest friend, and Hiccup's mentor. Later he is seen riding a Hotburple named Grump. He is also gay and appears in the films of the How to Train Your Dragon and DreamWorks Dragons: Rescue Riders.	United States
2012–2020	Doc McStuffins	March 23, 2012	Thea	Lesbian	The title character, Dottie "Doc" McStuffins, routinely interacts with toys, dolls, and stuffed animals that have come to life. In the episode "The Emergency Plan", two dolls form a lesbian married couple and are parents of two doll children. This was the first same-sex couple featured in a Disney Junior preschool series. They are voiced by Wanda Sykes and Portia de Rossi who are both lesbians.	United States
2012–2020	Doc McStuffins	March 23, 2012	Edie	Lesbian	The title character, Dottie "Doc" McStuffins, routinely interacts with toys, dolls, and stuffed animals that have come to life. In the episode "The Emergency Plan", two dolls form a lesbian married couple and are parents of two doll children. This was the first same-sex couple featured in a Disney Junior preschool series. They are voiced by Wanda Sykes and Portia de Rossi who are both lesbians.	United States

== 2013 ==
Duration	Show title	Character debut date	Characters	Identity	Notes	Country
2013	Gargantia on the Verdurous Planet	April 21, 2013	Lukkage	Bisexual	She has two female sex slaves who also serve as her co-pilots for her mecha, as shown in the episode "The Villainous Empress" and other episodes. Later she develops a romantic interest in Pinion, especially with his hair down. In the two OVAs for the show, Far Beyond the Voyage parts 1 and 2, Lukkage is a former pirate involved with salvaging and guarding Gargantia from threats, with her two companions still by her side, helping her run the ship and gather intel.	Japan
2013	Gatchaman Crowds	July 12, 2013	Hajime Ichinose	Ambiguous	Due to the fact that Hajime, one of the Gatchamen, fused with Berg Katze, who is an androgynous alien shapeshifter with no specified gender, this means that Hajime's gender may be ambiguous, although still clearly a teenage girl, as shown in the episode "inbound". In various episodes, Hajime has Katze speak through her even when not in her Gatchaman form, even asking for their thoughts on Rizumu Suzuki, the show's villain in the first season of the series, and for their thoughts on other matters as shown in the episode "2:6:2".	Japan
2013	Gatchaman Crowds	July 12, 2013	Berg Katze	Ambiguous	An androgynous alien shapeshifter with no specified gender, although referred to in official releases as male. They have the power to transform into anyone that they kiss, preferring men over women, disguising themselves to frame people for all types of crimes, shown in episodes like "Genuine". At the end of the series, she goes on a number of dates with Hajime Ichinose, one of the Gatchamen, and in the director's cut she fuses with Haijame during a fight, indicated in the OVA, "Embrace".	Japan
2013	Gatchaman Crowds	July 12, 2013	O.D.	Ambiguous	They are a flamboyant alien with no specific gender, although as a clear stereotype. They are later a guest on The Millione Show and replaced by DD.	Japan
2013	Kin-iro Mosaic	July 13, 2013	Aya Komichi	Lesbian	She is rather bashful towards Yoko, often not being honest with her feelings. She frequently misinterprets situations between herself and Yoko, responding indignantly and blushing, mostly because of not being able to admit her love to Yoko.	Japan
2013	My Teen Romantic Comedy SNAFU	April 19, 2013	Saika Totsuka	Gay	Saika is the president of the tennis club who has an androgynous appearance but prefers others to not mistake his gender. He is one of the few people who truly wants to be closer friends with Hachiman, despite Hachiman's tendency to push others away. Furthermore, at the summer camp Saika is shown to have a crush on Hachiman, sometimes dreaming about him and mumbling Hachiman's name in his sleep. Despite knowing that Saika is a boy, Hachiman oftentimes finds himself unwillingly attracted to him.	Japan
2013	Senran Kagura	January 6, 2013	Katsuragi	Lesbian	Katsuragi is a member of the "good ninjas" who shows a significant degree of sexual attraction towards several other female characters throughout the series. Notably, she is obsessed with breasts, and enjoys frequently groping her teammates.	Japan
2013	Yuyushiki	April 9, 2013	Yukari Hinata	Lesbian	She is a childhood friend of Yui, falling in love with her after Yui gave her candy at a second-grade picnic, with Yui feeling embarrassed of her in the past, but accepting her now, shown in various episodes. Like Yuzuko, she constantly flirts with Yui. She also admits loving Yuzuko in the fifth episode. Due to the "surreal" nature of Yuzuko and Yukari's portrayal, their orientation remains partially ambiguous.	Japan
2013	Yuyushiki	April 9, 2013	Yuzuko Nonohara	Lesbian	She has feelings for Yui, enjoying teasing and flirting with her, while she is also close with Yukari, who also loved Yui, often following Yuzuko's lead. On a few occasions, she admits wanting a date with Yui, and that she would pay 500 yen for two girls to get right to "business". Due to the "surreal" nature of Yuzuko and Yukari's portrayal, their orientation remains partially ambiguous.	Japan
2013	Yuyushiki	April 30, 2013	Kei Okano	Lesbian	She is quite fond of Chiho and is later shown to have a crush on her. This leads to her being often cold towards Yui for allegedly taking Chiho away from Kei's other friend, Fumi is aware of her fondness and interest in Chiho and often teases her about it, often acts as a "possessive classmate".	Japan
2013–2014	Samurai Flamenco	October 31, 2013	Mari Maya	Bisexual	Mari Maya, is a central member of the idol group, "Mineral Miracle Muse", writes and composes lyrics, while having a fetish for men in uniforms, and enjoys stepping on the testicles of "molesters and other evildoers". She also has an inferiority complex towards Moe, another member of the idol group, but the two later reconcile by kissing each other in the episode "The Wandering Hero".	Japan
2013–2014	Samurai Flamenco	October 31, 2013	Moe Morita	Lesbian	Mari Maya, is a central member of the idol group, "Mineral Miracle Muse", writes and composes lyrics, while having a fetish for men in uniforms, and enjoys stepping on the testicles of "molesters and other evildoers". She also has an inferiority complex towards Moe, another member of the idol group, but the two later reconcile by kissing each other in the episode "The Wandering Hero".	Japan
2013–2015	The Awesomes	September 5, 2013	Zip "Frantic" Danger	Gay	Frantic, who is "crazy fast" reject from a circus show, is forcibly outed under media pressure in "The Awesomes' Awesome Show". He later falls for Christopher, a member of villain team The Gay Mafia.	United States
2013–2015	The Awesomes	October 20, 2015	The Gayfather	Gay	The Gayfather is the leader of villain team The Gay Mafia, including members like Christopher and Steven, and makes his debut in "The Gayfather". Christopher falls for Frantic immediately upon meeting him, and sabotages his team's efforts as a result.	United States
2013–2016	Bee and PuppyCat	November 28, 2016	Toast	Bisexual	She is a wrestler who formerly wrestled with Cas and holds a grudge against her. In her debut episode, "Toast", she mentions her unnamed ex-wife. Toast also appears in "Bee and Puppycat Lazy in Space" in which Toast is revealed to be bisexual as she is in a relationship with Deckard and Cas' brother Merlin and is pregnant. She gives birth to twins in the episode "I Won't Leave You Alone".	United States
2013–2018	The Crumpets	December 21, 2013	Grownboy	Bisexual	Grownboy is the eldest child of the Crumpets. He lives with his romantic partner Steve in a trailer. They get married in the season 1 episode "Cheep Shot".	France
2013–2018	The Crumpets	December 21, 2013	Steve	Gay	Grownboy is the eldest child of the Crumpets. He lives with his romantic partner Steve in a trailer. They get married in the season 1 episode "Cheep Shot".	France
2013–2020	Steven Universe	November 4, 2013	Ruby	Lesbian & Non-binary	Two sexless but feminine-presenting members of the Crystal Gems who have a romantic relationship with each other, and stay permanently fused to form Garnet. Also the co-executive producer, Ian Jones-Quartey, has confirmed that, according to human standards and terminology, calling Ruby and Sapphire non-binary, feminine-presenting lesbians would be "a fair assessment". On July 6, 2018, the episode "Reunited" aired, in which Ruby and Sapphire get married, kiss, and fuse into Garnet, after Ruby proposed to Sapphire in a previous episode, "The Question". Sapphire is voiced by a lesbian actress, Erica Luttrell while Lo Mutuc (credited as Charlyne Yi) came out as non-binary after the series ended in 2020. Garnet re-appeared in the 2019 film, Steven Universe: The Movie and in the limited series Steven Universe Future, as did Pearl, Sadie, Stevonnie, Rose Quartz, and Bismuth.	United States
2013–2020	Steven Universe	November 4, 2013	Sapphire	Lesbian & Non-binary		United States
2013–2020	Steven Universe	November 4, 2013	Pearl	Lesbian & Non-binary	In "We Need to Talk", it is very apparent that Pearl, a female-presenting non-binary Gem, is attracted to another Gem named Rose Quartz, her now-deceased leader. Her feelings are later confirmed romantic in nature and reciprocated by Rose. In "Last One Out of Beach City", Pearl is attracted to a female pink-haired human, which resembles Rose. In the episode "Bismuth Casual", Pearl allows Bismuth to flirt with her and has various female humans she is friendly with at the roller rink, where she has been in the past, implying she collects their numbers.	United States
2013–2020	Steven Universe	November 4, 2013	Sadie Miller	Pansexual or Bisexual	Formerly an employee of the Big Donut and lead singer of Sadie Killer & the Suspects, Sadie has a romantic attraction to men and those of other genders, so she can confidently be described as pansexual or bisexual. For much of the show, it was hinted that she had a crush on Lars Barriga, a fellow employee of the Big Donut, who is often a jerk towards her, but occasionally reciprocates her feelings for him. (Note: See the episodes "Tiger Millionaire," "Horror Club," "The New Lars," "The Good Lars," "I Am My Mom," "Stuck Together," and "Lars of the Stars" for examples of the relationship between Sadie and Lars.) In the episode "Island Adventure", they share a kiss and remain friends after Lars returns from space in "Change Your Mind". She later begins a relationship with Shep, a non-binary character. She also is attracted to Stevonnie, an intersex/non-binary character, a fusion of Connie and Steven, as shown in Stevonnie's debut episode.	United States
2013–2020	Steven Universe	November 18, 2013	Harold Smiley	Gay	Storyboard artist Raven Molisee confirmed that Mr. Smiley is gay because of his longtime relationship with another comedian Mr. Frowney. In the book, Steven Universe: Art & Origins, episode concepts for "Future Boy Zoltron" note that Mr. Smiley and Mr. Frowney are in a relationship.	United States
2013–2020	Steven Universe	November 18, 2013	Quentin Frowney	Gay	Storyboard artist Raven Molisee confirmed that Mr. Smiley is gay because of his longtime relationship with another comedian Mr. Frowney. In the book, Steven Universe: Art & Origins, episode concepts for "Future Boy Zoltron" note that Mr. Smiley and Mr. Frowney are in a relationship.	United States
2013–2020	Steven Universe	November 18, 2013	Kiki Pizza	Pansexual	In Issue 2 of the Steven Universe comics, Kiki and Stevonnie hang out, shopping together, with Kiki asking Stevonnie out to the school prom. Later on, hijinks ensue, with Steven and Connie unfusing, with both re-fusing, asking Stevonnie out for real. Comics are considered level 2 canon for the Steven Universe TV series.	United States
2013–2020	Steven Universe	January 15, 2015	Stevonnie	Intersex	Stevonnie is a fusion of both Steven and Connie. Steven and Connie identify as male and female respectively, but the gender of Stevonnie is difficult to describe, with series creator Rebecca Sugar describing it as the "living relationship between Steven and Connie". Stevonnie is commonly referred to with gender neutral pronouns (such as the singular they), while male and female characters seem to be physically attracted to Stevonnie. Stevonnie also appears in a non-speaking role in the episode "Bismuth Casual" of the limited epilogue series Steven Universe Future.	United States
2013–2020	Steven Universe	January 15, 2015	Stevonnie	Non-binary		United States
2013–2020	Steven Universe	January 8, 2015	Peridot	Asexual	Storyboard artist Maya Petersen stated that Peridot is asexual and aromantic on her Twitter, even though she said her word is not "the ultimate authority" on the matter. This asexual identity was never expressed in the show directly, with fans shipping Peridot with various other characters, specifically Lapis Lazuli and Amethyst, some reviewers even seeing Peridot and Lapis in a "close, loving relationship" in the past.	United States
2013–2020	Steven Universe	April 9, 2015	Rose Quartz	Pansexual	Rose was in a complicated romantic relationship with Pearl, and later with Greg Universe, the father of the show's protagonist, Steven Universe, along with various other men in short-term relationships. In the episode "Mr. Greg", Greg and Pearl recognize that they both loved Rose, who loved them both back.	United States
2013–2020	Steven Universe	August 4, 2016	Bismuth	Lesbian	In the Steven Universe Future episode "Bismuth Casual", where Pearl invites Bismuth to the roller rink to "set her up" with some of her friends, Bismuth admits to having a crush on Pearl to Steven, as they form a "deep bond" together. This is hinted to through her flirting toward Pearl in the episode "Bismuth".	United States
2013–2023	Attack on Titan	April 7, 2013	Zoë Hange	Ambiguous	Hange Zoë is a Section Commander of the Scouting Regiment who serves as its veteran leader of 4th Squad and a scientist who studies the Titans. In the original English translation of the original manga, Hange is referred to as a female, and is also portrayed as one in the anime adaptation. However, in a blog post in 2011, Isayama responded to a question regarding Hange's gender, saying, "Perhaps [Hange's gender] is better left unstated". In 2014, Kodansha USA stated they went back through volume 5 and removed gender-specific pronouns they had used for reprint, and references from volume 6 onwards.	Japan
2013–2023	Attack on Titan	April 14, 2013	Historia Reiss	Bisexual	The official website mentions Ymir is in love with Historia (Krista). According to a panel in 2014, it was hinted that Historia may have reciprocated by the confirmation of them being a 'couple', with the English voice actress for Ymir, Elizabeth Maxwell, hoping that how their relationship is portrayed would "have an impact that echoes far into the future".	Japan
2013–2023	Attack on Titan	April 21, 2013	Ymir	Lesbian	The official website mentions Ymir is in love with Historia (Krista). According to a panel in 2014, it was hinted that Historia may have reciprocated by the confirmation of them being a 'couple', with the English voice actress for Ymir, Elizabeth Maxwell, hoping that how their relationship is portrayed would "have an impact that echoes far into the future".	Japan
2013–present	Rick and Morty	December 2, 2013	Jerry Smith	Bisexual or Pansexual	The season five episode "Mort Dinner Rick Andre" confirmed that the father of Morty, Jerry, is queer because he, and Beth, his wife, have a threesome with the King of the Ocean, otherwise known as Mr. Nimbus. Jerry has feelings for Mr. Nimbus, and due to the fact he has a wife, it means he is either pansexual or bisexual, with both he and Beth in a "sex-positive place" in their relationship, according to Jerry's voice actor, Chris Parnell. The fact he is queer was already hinted in the episode "Total Rickall".	United States
2013–present	Rick and Morty	August 16, 2015	Sleepy Gary	Bisexual	In "Total Rickall", Sleepy Gary is one of the dozens of aliens that alter the memories of Rick, Morty, Beth and Summer to pose as friends and family members. Because of the fake memories, Beth believes herself to be married with Sleepy Gary, and Jerry believes he is having a secret affair with him.	United States
2013–present	RWBY	July 18, 2013	Yang Xiao Long	Queer	She is a teammate of Blake and fellow huntress. She works with Blake to kill Adam Taurus, and grows romantically closer to her. She accepts Blake's feelings toward her in the Volume 9 episode "Confessions Within Cumulonimbus Clouds", confesses her own feelings, and both kiss.	United States
2013–present	RWBY	July 25, 2013	Blake Belladonna	Bisexual	In a conversation with the voice actresses for Ruby Rose (Lindsay Jones), Weiss Schnee (Kara Eberle), Yang (Barbara Dunkelman), and Patty Hawkins, for GalaxyCon, the voice actress for Blake, Arryn Zech, confirmed that Blake likes men and women, with the other cast members concurring with her assessment. She had a previous relationship with her abusive boyfriend, Adam Taurus. She gets along well with her teammate, Yang Xiao Long. Fans and reviewers either shipped them as "Bumbleby" after the episode "Burning the Candle", or noted their growing relationship over the show's seasons. At the end of the show's sixth season, Yang works with Blake to kill Adam Taurus, and her romantic feelings were "strongly hinted". She also is close to Sun Wukong in other episodes. In the Volume 9 episode "Confessions Within Cumulonimbus Clouds", Blake and Yang accept their feelings for one another and kiss. Some reviewers also noted romantic subtext between both characters in RWBY: Ice Queendom.	United States
2013–present	RWBY	January 7, 2017	Ilia Amitola	Lesbian	Ilia confessed that she has held onto romantic feelings for her former-current-best friend Blake Belladonna in the episode "Alone Together". Miles Luna, one of the show runners, confirmed her sexuality in a 2018 Reddit AMA. The show's official companion book described her as the show's "first explicitly nonheterosexual character" who has a "tangle of complicated feelings" for Blake.	United States
2013–present	RWBY	December 8, 2018	Saphron Cotta-Arc	Lesbian	Saphron, the sister of Jaune Arc, and her wife, Terra, have a son named Adrian, with all three making their debut in the seventh episode of Volume 6, "The Grimm Reaper". Voice actor Lindsay Jones, who voices Ruby Rose, later defended the inclusion of the couple in the series.	United States
2013–present	RWBY	December 8, 2018	Terra Cotta-Arc	Lesbian	Saphron, the sister of Jaune Arc, and her wife, Terra, have a son named Adrian, with all three making their debut in the seventh episode of Volume 6, "The Grimm Reaper". Voice actor Lindsay Jones, who voices Ruby Rose, later defended the inclusion of the couple in the series.	United States
2013–present	RWBY	November 30, 2019	May Marigold	Trans woman	May is a trans woman, which was confirmed by her voice actress, Kdin Jenzen, who is also transgender. She is a member of a rebellion faction and was inspired by the Robin Hood character Maid Marian. Her transgender identity was later confirmed on screen during the Volume 8 episode "War". May has a power that reflects elements of her personality, with hers being invisibility, which could be a manifestation of her dysphoria and will not to be seen.	United States

== 2014 ==
Duration	Show title	Character debut date	Characters	Identity	Notes	Country
2014	Akame ga Kill!	August 3, 2014	Seryu Ubiquitous	Lesbian	She is implied to love Esdeath, who she felt gave her a reason to live besides her own warped sense of justice, as shown in the episode "Kill the Empty Dream", and she has a tragic end in the series.	Japan
2014	Akame ga Kill!	November 2, 2014	Suzuka	Bisexual	She is bisexual, having shown enjoyment at being beaten by a group of spies and showing sexual interest in Esdeath and Tatsumi, indicated in episodes like "Kill the Fate".	Japan
2014	Chozen	January 13, 2014	Chozen	Gay	Chozen is a white, gay, aspiring rap superstar. He is in a relationship with fratboy-type Hunter.	United States
2014	Chozen	January 13, 2014	Hunter	Gay	Chozen is a white, gay, aspiring rap superstar. He is in a relationship with fratboy-type Hunter.	United States
2014	Gugure! Kokkuri-san	October 12, 2014	Inugami	Ambiguous	Inugami is a dog spirit who adores Kohina as she was the only one to care for them when they were alive. Because they cannot remember which gender they originally were, they frequently switch genders, and it becomes a running gag in the series.	Japan
2014	Inari, Konkon, Koi Iroha	January 15, 2014	Akemi Sumizome	Lesbian	A popular girl who constantly gets confessions from boys, but she later finds herself falling in love with tomboy Keiko Sanjō. Though Keiko rejects her, the two remain friends and Inari "yearns for her", with Akemi later confessing to Inari that she loves her.	Japan
2014	Inugami-san to Nekoyama-san	April 10, 2014	Yachiyo Inugami	Lesbian	Yachiyo and Suzu fall in love at first sight after they get introduced to each other by their mutual friend, Aki Hiiragi. The whole series revolves around their relationship.	Japan
2014	Inugami-san to Nekoyama-san	April 10, 2014	Suzu Nekoyama	Lesbian	Yachiyo and Suzu fall in love at first sight after they get introduced to each other by their mutual friend, Aki Hiiragi. The whole series revolves around their relationship.	Japan
2014	Love Stage!!	July 9, 2014	Izumi Sena	Bisexual	Ryoma is a 20-year-old popular actor and hard-worker, while Izumi is an 18-year-old geeky university student. The two fall in love despite Izumi initially not being comfortable with the idea of being in a relationship with another man and Ryoma struggling to accept his feelings despite having previously only liked women as shown in the episode "The Door to My Dreams" and others.	Japan
2014	Love Stage!!	July 9, 2014	Ryoma Ichijo	Bisexual	Ryoma is a 20-year-old popular actor and hard-worker, while Izumi is an 18-year-old geeky university student. The two fall in love despite Izumi initially not being comfortable with the idea of being in a relationship with another man and Ryoma struggling to accept his feelings despite having previously only liked women as shown in the episode "The Door to My Dreams" and others.	Japan
2014	Riddle Story of Devil	April 3, 2014	Tokaku Azuma	Lesbian	Tokaku protects Haru and initially believes her feelings for her are due to Haru's manipulation ability but grows to realize her feelings are genuine.	Japan
2014	Riddle Story of Devil	April 3, 2014	Haru Ichinose	Lesbian	Tokaku protects Haru and initially believes her feelings for her are due to Haru's manipulation ability but grows to realize her feelings are genuine.	Japan
2014	Sabagebu! -Survival Game Club!	July 6, 2014	Urara Kasugano	Lesbian	Initially doting on Miou, she falls in love with Momoka instead after developing a masochistic taste for her violent punishments.	Japan
2014	Sakura Trick	January 9, 2014	Haruka Takayama	Lesbian	Haruka and Yū are in a romantic relationship.	Japan
2014	Sakura Trick	January 9, 2014	Yū Sonoda	Lesbian	Haruka and Yū are in a romantic relationship.	Japan
2014	Sakura Trick	January 16, 2014	Kotone Noda	Lesbian	Kotone and Shizuku are in a romantic relationship, shown in episodes like "Yet Another Cherry Blossom Color" and live together.	Japan
2014	Sakura Trick	January 16, 2014	Shizuku Minami	Lesbian	Kotone and Shizuku are in a romantic relationship, shown in episodes like "Yet Another Cherry Blossom Color" and live together.	Japan
2014	Sakura Trick	January 23, 2014	Mitsuki Sonoda	Lesbian	Mitsuki is Yū's older sister. She is suspicious of the relationship between Haruka and Yū, and disapproves of it. However, she develops a crush on Haruka.	Japan
2014	Soul Eater Not!	April 22, 2014	Jacqueline O'Lantern Dupré	Lesbian	Kim befriends Jacqueline, one of her bully victims who has a secret crush on her, and they become partners. They break up in the show's seventh episode, "Nice Day For a Death Bazaar!", but may still have some feelings for each other after that point. Kim also has feelings toward Ox Ford at the same academy.	Japan
2014	Soul Eater Not!	April 15, 2014	Kim Diehl	Bisexual	Kim befriends Jacqueline, one of her bully victims who has a secret crush on her, and they become partners. They break up in the show's seventh episode, "Nice Day For a Death Bazaar!", but may still have some feelings for each other after that point. Kim also has feelings toward Ox Ford at the same academy.	Japan
2014	The Kawai Complex Guide to Manors and Hostel Behavior	April 3, 2014	Sayaka "Ayaka" Watanabe	Bisexual	Ayaka is a college student who loves to lead men on but reveals later on that she dates both men and women and loves reading BL in the episode "Thought So". She also is shown to have a sexual attraction to her fellow dormmate Mayumi, whom she often fondles despite the latter's resentment.	Japan
2014–2015	Cross Ange	November 1, 2014	Hilda Schlievogt	Lesbian	Hilda was lovers with Zola, who often fondles other women "or having sex with them", and later begins to engage in sexual relations with Chris and Rosalie, while she is attracted to Angelise "Ange". Rosalie deeply loves Chris.	Japan
2014–2015	Cross Ange	November 1, 2014	Zola Axberg	Lesbian	Hilda was lovers with Zola, who often fondles other women "or having sex with them", and later begins to engage in sexual relations with Chris and Rosalie, while she is attracted to Angelise "Ange". Rosalie deeply loves Chris.	Japan
2014–2015	Cross Ange	November 1, 2014	Chris	Lesbian	Hilda was lovers with Zola, who often fondles other women "or having sex with them", and later begins to engage in sexual relations with Chris and Rosalie, while she is attracted to Angelise "Ange". Rosalie deeply loves Chris.	Japan
2014–2015	Cross Ange	November 1, 2014	Rosalie	Lesbian	Hilda was lovers with Zola, who often fondles other women "or having sex with them", and later begins to engage in sexual relations with Chris and Rosalie, while she is attracted to Angelise "Ange". Rosalie deeply loves Chris.	Japan
2014–2015	Knights of Sidonia	April 10, 2014	Izana Shinatose	Third gender	Izana belongs to a new, nonbinary third gender that originated during the hundreds of years of human emigration into space, as first shown in the episode "Commencement". Izana later turns into a girl after falling in love with Nagate Tanasake.	Japan
2014–2016	Clarence	December 4, 2014	EJ Randell	Lesbian	EJ and Sue, who were introduced in "Jeff Wins", are Jeff's mothers. They are voiced by lesbian comedians Lea DeLaria and Tig Notaro.	United States
2014–2016	Clarence	December 4, 2014	Sue Randell	Lesbian	EJ and Sue, who were introduced in "Jeff Wins", are Jeff's mothers. They are voiced by lesbian comedians Lea DeLaria and Tig Notaro.	United States
2014–2016	Sailor Moon Crystal	April 4, 2016	Sailor Neptune (Michiru Kaioh)	Lesbian	Originally appearing in the Sailor Moon series, Michiru and Haruka reappear in this series, with their relationship not portrayed as "cousins" as the original English version of Sailor Moon asserted, but rather as a genuine romantic relationship.	Japan
2014–2016	Sailor Moon Crystal	April 4, 2016	Sailor Uranus (Haruka Tenoh)	Lesbian	Originally appearing in the Sailor Moon series, Michiru and Haruka reappear in this series, with their relationship not portrayed as "cousins" as the original English version of Sailor Moon asserted, but rather as a genuine romantic relationship.	Japan
2014–2016	Sailor Moon Crystal	April 4, 2016	Sailor Uranus (Haruka Tenoh)	Non-binary	In the series, Michiru refers to Haruka as "both male and female, but also neither", making Haruka be the first character in the franchise to be referred to that way. She is also said to have an independent attitude and not care much for teamwork. She also reappears in the film, Sailor Moon Eternal, as does Neptune.	Japan
2014–2020	BoJack Horseman	August 22, 2014	Todd Chavez	Asexual	In the season 3 finale, "That Went Well", Todd confides in his friend Emily that he doesn't think he is either straight or gay, and in fact "might be nothing". He explores the identity further in season 4 and accepts his asexuality, while meeting others who share his orientation. Todd was the only asexual character GLAAD found on streaming platforms in 2018.	United States
2014–2020	BoJack Horseman	September 8, 2017	Hollyhock's fathers	Gay	Hollyhock, a female teenage horse and Bojack's sister, has eight adoptive fathers (Dashawn Manheim, Steve Mannheim, Jose Guerrero, Cupe Robinson III, Otto Zilberschlag, Arturo "Ice Man" Fonzerelli, Gregory Hsung, and Quackers McQuack) in a polyamorous gay relationship.	United States
2014–2020	BoJack Horseman	September 14, 2018	Mary-Beth	Lesbian	Mary-Beth and Dr Indria are a married lesbian couple, as shown in the episode "INT. SUB". Mary-Beth is a professional businesswoman while Dr Indria is a therapist. They both first appear in the fifth season. Mary-Beth is voiced by lesbian comedian Wanda Sykes.	United States
2014–2020	BoJack Horseman	September 14, 2018	Dr. Indria	Lesbian	Mary-Beth and Dr Indria are a married lesbian couple, as shown in the episode "INT. SUB". Mary-Beth is a professional businesswoman while Dr Indria is a therapist. They both first appear in the fifth season. Mary-Beth is voiced by lesbian comedian Wanda Sykes.	United States
2014–2020	Mike Tyson Mysteries	October 27, 2014	Marquess of Queensberry	Gay or Bisexual	One of the main characters of the show and member of the Mike Tyson Mystery team who was based on the real-life 9th Marquess of Queensberry John Douglas. In the show, he is initially portrayed as a flamboyant gay ghost. Despite this, it is revealed that Marquess originally had a relationship with a woman, which resulted in the birth of his son, Alfred. This shows that Marquess was likely either bisexual or had lost interest in women over the years. Marquess of Queensberry is voiced by queer actor Jim Rash.	United States
2014–present	Hey Duggee	June 24, 2015	Mr. John Crab	Gay	Mr. John Crab and his quiet husband Nigel Crab first appeared in the series 1 episode "The Sandcastle Badge". In the series 3 episode "The Telling Time Badge", they celebrate their wedding anniversary.	United Kingdom
2014–present	Hey Duggee	June 24, 2015	Nigel Crab	Gay	Mr. John Crab and his quiet husband Nigel Crab first appeared in the series 1 episode "The Sandcastle Badge". In the series 3 episode "The Telling Time Badge", they celebrate their wedding anniversary.	United Kingdom

== See also ==
- List of yuri anime and manga
- List of LGBT-related films by year
- List of animated films with LGBT characters
- LGBTQ themes in Western animation
- LGBTQ themes in anime and manga
