= List of animated films with LGBTQ characters =

Following is a list of animated feature films featuring lesbian, gay, bisexual, transgender, queer and otherwise LGBTQ characters. For each animated film, the year of release, title, characters, identities, and country of origin are given. Any applicable franchise associated with the film is also noted. For each animated film, notes are given to indicate the nature of the featured LGBTQ characters.

There are also separate lists of LGBTQ-related films, films with LGBTQ themes organized by year and animated series with LGBTQ characters. (Note: There are also pages listing characters by their LGBTQ identity, specifically for asexual characters, aromantic characters bisexual characters, gay characters, intersex characters, lesbian characters, List of fictional non-binary characters, lesbian characters, polyamorous characters, and trans characters.)

== Film franchises ==
Franchise	Year	Title	Characters	Identity	Notes	Country
Angry Birds	2016	The Angry Birds Movie	Chuck	Bisexual	Chuck was confirmed to be bisexual in the movie continuity.	Finland-United States
Angry Birds	2016	The Angry Birds Movie	Stella	Lesbian	Stella is a lesbian in the movie continuity. Stella is voiced by lesbian comedian and actress Kate McKinnon.	Finland-United States
Angry Birds	2016	The Angry Birds Movie	Willow	Aromantic	Willow was confirmed to be aromantic.	Finland-United States
Angry Birds	2019	The Angry Birds Movie 2	Silver	Genderfluid	Silver was confirmed to be genderfluid.	Finland-United States
Angry Birds	2019	The Angry Birds Movie 2	Zeta	Genderqueer	Zeta was confirmed to be genderqueer.	Finland-United States
Angry Birds	2026	The Angry Birds Movie 2	Zeta	Genderqueer	Zeta was confirmed to be genderqueer.	Finland-United States
DC Animated Movie Universe	2016	Batman: Bad Blood	Katherine "Kate" Kane (Batwoman)	Lesbian	The lesbian superheroine Batwoman has a major role in this film. This is the first time she is openly shown as a lesbian woman in animated media. She is seen flirting with the lesbian detective Renee Montoya. Kate's father, Colonel Jacob Kane, is supportive of her sexual orientation.	United States
DC Animated Movie Universe	2016	Batman: Bad Blood	Renee Montoya	Lesbian	The lesbian superheroine Batwoman has a major role in this film. This is the first time she is openly shown as a lesbian woman in animated media. She is seen flirting with the lesbian detective Renee Montoya. Kate's father, Colonel Jacob Kane, is supportive of her sexual orientation.	United States
DC Animated Movie Universe	2018	Suicide Squad: Hell to Pay	Scandal Savage	Lesbian	During the animated film, Scandal and Knockout, prominent characters in the film, are displayed as lovers. Knockout first appears alongside Scandal breaking through Professor Pyg's lair and taking him hostage to their apartment. She is later seen in the hospital in critical condition after being shot, but with a concerned Scandal by her side. At one point in the film, Savage and Knockout share a kiss, while Knockout is shown fully nude at one point.	United States
DC Animated Movie Universe	2018	Suicide Squad: Hell to Pay	Knockout	Bisexual	During the animated film, Scandal and Knockout, prominent characters in the film, are displayed as lovers. Knockout first appears alongside Scandal breaking through Professor Pyg's lair and taking him hostage to their apartment. She is later seen in the hospital in critical condition after being shot, but with a concerned Scandal by her side. At one point in the film, Savage and Knockout share a kiss, while Knockout is shown fully nude at one point.	United States
DC Animated Movie Universe	2019	Wonder Woman: Bloodlines	Etta Candy	Lesbian	Etta Candy appears in the animated film as an openly lesbian African-American, voiced by Adrienne C. Moore.	United States
DC Animated Movie Universe	2020	Justice League Dark: Apokolips War	John Constantine	Bisexual	They are ex-boyfriends, as noted by Constantine's voice actor, Matt Ryan, in an interview.	United States
DC Animated Movie Universe	2020	Justice League Dark: Apokolips War	King Shark	Bisexual	They are ex-boyfriends, as noted by Constantine's voice actor, Matt Ryan, in an interview.	United States
Futurama	2008	Futurama: The Beast with a Billion Backs	Colleen O'Hallahan	Polyamorous	Colleen has five boyfriends: Fry, Chu, Ndulu, Schlomo and Bolt Rolands. After Yivo the planet-sized alien marries and breaks up with all people of the universe at once, she remains in a relationship only with Yivo.	United States
Futurama	2008	Futurama: The Beast with a Billion Backs	Yivo	Non-binary	Yivo is a planet-sized alien with no determinable gender, dating, then marrying all people of the universe at once. Later, they break up. Afterwards, Yivo remains in a relationship with Colleen. Some have said that Yivo may have been "the first non-binary character defined as such in animated history."	United States
How to Train Your Dragon	2014	How to Train Your Dragon 2	Gobber the Belch	Gay	The character's voice actor Craig Ferguson ad-libbed a line in the second film in which he mentions that he never got married for an undisclosed reason. Ferguson and director Dean DeBlois have confirmed that this was in reference to the character's homosexuality. His sexuality was also hinted at again in the third film, where he seems to fall for Eret.	United States
How to Train Your Dragon	2019	How to Train Your Dragon: The Hidden World	Gobber the Belch	Gay	The character's voice actor Craig Ferguson ad-libbed a line in the second film in which he mentions that he never got married for an undisclosed reason. Ferguson and director Dean DeBlois have confirmed that this was in reference to the character's homosexuality. His sexuality was also hinted at again in the third film, where he seems to fall for Eret.	United States
My Little Pony: Equestria Girls	2013	My Little Pony: Equestria Girls	Curly Winds	Gay	In this film, Curly saves Wiz from falling off a ladder in the movie's song, "Time to Come Together." Ishi Rudell, Michael Vogel, and Jayson Thiessen said that the two become a romantic couple after this moment. Other media of the franchise shows them sitting together, including in the film Rainbow Rocks, the song "Coinky-Dink World" in the 2017 Equestria Girls music videos, the episode "Queen of Clubs" of Equestria Girls: Better Together, Rollercoaster of Friendship and Sunset's Backstage Pass. In the audio commentary of the Rainbow Rocks home media, Michael Vogel refers to "Curly Winds" and "Wiz Kid" as a "couple" during their shot singing together in "Welcome to the Show".	United States/Canada
My Little Pony: Equestria Girls	2013	My Little Pony: Equestria Girls	Wiz Kid	Gay		United States/Canada
Neon Genesis Evangelion	1997	The End of Evangelion	Maya Ibuki	Lesbian	Over the course of the original Neon Genesis Evangelion anime series, it is implied that Maya gradually develops feelings beyond professional respect for Ritsuko which turns into a crush. She also sees Ritsuko before reverting back into LCL during Human Instrumentality in the 1997 film The End of Evangelion. Maya Ibuki has also appeared in the Rebuild of Evangelion film series.	Japan
Neon Genesis Evangelion	2007	Evangelion: 1.0 You Are (Not) Alone	Maya Ibuki	Lesbian	Over the course of the original Neon Genesis Evangelion anime series, it is implied that Maya gradually develops feelings beyond professional respect for Ritsuko which turns into a crush. She also sees Ritsuko before reverting back into LCL during Human Instrumentality in the 1997 film The End of Evangelion. Maya Ibuki has also appeared in the Rebuild of Evangelion film series.	Japan
Neon Genesis Evangelion	2009	Evangelion: 2.0 You Can (Not) Advance	Maya Ibuki	Lesbian	Over the course of the original Neon Genesis Evangelion anime series, it is implied that Maya gradually develops feelings beyond professional respect for Ritsuko which turns into a crush. She also sees Ritsuko before reverting back into LCL during Human Instrumentality in the 1997 film The End of Evangelion. Maya Ibuki has also appeared in the Rebuild of Evangelion film series.	Japan
Neon Genesis Evangelion	2012	Evangelion: 3.0 You Can (Not) Redo	Maya Ibuki	Lesbian	Over the course of the original Neon Genesis Evangelion anime series, it is implied that Maya gradually develops feelings beyond professional respect for Ritsuko which turns into a crush. She also sees Ritsuko before reverting back into LCL during Human Instrumentality in the 1997 film The End of Evangelion. Maya Ibuki has also appeared in the Rebuild of Evangelion film series.	Japan
Neon Genesis Evangelion	2021	Evangelion: 3.0+1.0 Thrice Upon a Time	Maya Ibuki	Lesbian	Over the course of the original Neon Genesis Evangelion anime series, it is implied that Maya gradually develops feelings beyond professional respect for Ritsuko which turns into a crush. She also sees Ritsuko before reverting back into LCL during Human Instrumentality in the 1997 film The End of Evangelion. Maya Ibuki has also appeared in the Rebuild of Evangelion film series.	Japan
Sailor Moon	1993	Sailor Moon R: The Movie	Usagi Tsukino (Sailor Moon)	Bisexual	Usagi develops attraction to both her fellow Guardians and men like Mamoru Chiba (Tuxedo Mask), that she comes to love and hate, including the likes of Seiya Kou and Haruka Tenoh, the former whom becomes one of her love interests and the latter that she seems to have a crush on regardless of Haruka's gender.	Japan
Sailor Moon	1994	Sailor Moon S: The Movie	Usagi Tsukino (Sailor Moon)	Bisexual	Usagi develops attraction to both her fellow Guardians and men like Mamoru Chiba (Tuxedo Mask), that she comes to love and hate, including the likes of Seiya Kou and Haruka Tenoh, the former whom becomes one of her love interests and the latter that she seems to have a crush on regardless of Haruka's gender.	Japan
Sailor Moon	1995	Sailor Moon Super S: The Movie	Usagi Tsukino (Sailor Moon)	Bisexual	Usagi develops attraction to both her fellow Guardians and men like Mamoru Chiba (Tuxedo Mask), that she comes to love and hate, including the likes of Seiya Kou and Haruka Tenoh, the former whom becomes one of her love interests and the latter that she seems to have a crush on regardless of Haruka's gender.	Japan
Sailor Moon	2021	Sailor Moon Eternal	Usagi Tsukino (Sailor Moon)	Bisexual	Usagi develops attraction to both her fellow Guardians and men like Mamoru Chiba (Tuxedo Mask), that she comes to love and hate, including the likes of Seiya Kou and Haruka Tenoh, the former whom becomes one of her love interests and the latter that she seems to have a crush on regardless of Haruka's gender.	Japan
Sailor Moon	2023	Sailor Moon Cosmos	Usagi Tsukino (Sailor Moon)	Bisexual	Usagi develops attraction to both her fellow Guardians and men like Mamoru Chiba (Tuxedo Mask), that she comes to love and hate, including the likes of Seiya Kou and Haruka Tenoh, the former whom becomes one of her love interests and the latter that she seems to have a crush on regardless of Haruka's gender.	Japan
Sailor Moon	1993	Sailor Moon R: The Movie	Fiore	Gay	Fiore is an alien who landed on Earth and met Mamoru Chiba (Tuxedo Mask) when they were both children. Years later, as adults, Fiore comes back to Earth and tries to reconnect with Mamoru. It is strongly implied that Fiore's feelings for Mamoru are romantic.	Japan
Sailor Moon	1994	Sailor Moon S: The Movie	Haruka Tenoh (Sailor Uranus)	Lesbian	Haruka and Michiru are in a romantic relationship, as shown in Sailor Moon S: The Movie and Sailor Moon Super S. They also reappear in the 2021 two-part film, Sailor Moon Eternal, a continuation of the Sailor Moon Crystal series. Due to their relationship, Haruka regularly cross-dresses as a boy.	Japan
Sailor Moon	1995	Sailor Moon Super S: The Movie	Michiru Kaioh (Sailor Neptune)	Lesbian	Haruka and Michiru are in a romantic relationship, as shown in Sailor Moon S: The Movie and Sailor Moon Super S. They also reappear in the 2021 two-part film, Sailor Moon Eternal, a continuation of the Sailor Moon Crystal series. Due to their relationship, Haruka regularly cross-dresses as a boy.	Japan
Sailor Moon	2021	Sailor Moon Eternal	Fish Eye	Gay	Fish Eye is an effeminate circus performer who cross-dresses as a woman due to his romantic affections towards other men in the original Sailor Moon anime series. In the two-part film, he tries to lure Ami Mizuno (Sailor Mercury) into a nightmarish trap, and is voiced by Shouta Aoi.	Japan
Sailor Moon	2023	Sailor Moon Cosmos	Seiya Kou (Sailor Star Fighter)	Genderqueer	In the original Sailor Moon anime series, Seiya is female in sailor senshi form and male in civilian form. In both the original Sailor Moon anime series and the two-part film, Seiya is in love with Usagi.	Japan
Sailor Moon	2023	Sailor Moon Cosmos	Seiya Kou (Sailor Star Fighter)	Lesbian	In the original Sailor Moon anime series, Seiya is female in sailor senshi form and male in civilian form. In both the original Sailor Moon anime series and the two-part film, Seiya is in love with Usagi.	Japan
The SpongeBob Movie	2004	The SpongeBob SquarePants Movie	SpongeBob SquarePants	Asexual	In 2002, Stephen Hillenburg clarified in an interview that SpongeBob is neither gay nor straight but is asexual. He went on to say that Sea Sponges reproduce asexually by "budding", much like real-life sea sponges, likewise SpongeBob wouldn't necessarily need romance. This was once again discussed in 2005, a few months after the first movie was released, due to controversy as to whether SpongeBob and Patrick were homosexuals. Years later, it was revealed that Hillenburg instructed the showrunners that SpongeBob should never have a romantic relationship, since he is asexual and too innocent for it, with series writer Vincent Waller saying it didn't fit "organically" for Spongebob and Sandy to be in a romantic relationship.	United States
The SpongeBob Movie	2015	The SpongeBob Movie: Sponge Out of Water	SpongeBob SquarePants	Asexual		United States
The SpongeBob Movie	2020/2021	The SpongeBob Movie: Sponge on the Run	SpongeBob SquarePants	Asexual		United States
The SpongeBob Movie	2024	Saving Bikini Bottom: The Sandy Cheeks Movie	SpongeBob SquarePants	Asexual		United States
The SpongeBob Movie	2025	Plankton: The Movie	SpongeBob SquarePants	Asexual		United States
The SpongeBob Movie	2025	The SpongeBob Movie: Search for SquarePants	SpongeBob SquarePants	Asexual		United States
Zootopia	2016	Zootopia	Bucky Oryx-Antlerson and Pronk Oryx-Antlerson	Gay	Bucky and Pronk are an anthropomorphic kudu and oryx, respectively, who are loud and argumentative neighbors to main protagonist Judy Hopps. Given their differing species and sharing a hyphenated surname, viewers and fans speculated the pair were a married same-sex couple. This was later confirmed by co-director Jared Bush. They also appeared in Zootopia+ and Zootopia 2.	United States
Zootopia	2025	Zootopia 2	Bucky Oryx-Antlerson and Pronk Oryx-Antlerson	Gay	Bucky and Pronk are an anthropomorphic kudu and oryx, respectively, who are loud and argumentative neighbors to main protagonist Judy Hopps. Given their differing species and sharing a hyphenated surname, viewers and fans speculated the pair were a married same-sex couple. This was later confirmed by co-director Jared Bush. They also appeared in Zootopia+ and Zootopia 2.	United States

== One-off films ==
Year	Title	Characters	Identity	Notes	Country
1970s–80s
1970	Cleopatra	Apollodoria	Lesbian	Apollodoria is attracted to Cleopatra and has feelings for her.	Japan
1970	Cleopatra	Octavian	Gay	Octavian is attracted to Ionius and spares his life.	Japan
1974	The Nine Lives of Fritz the Cat	Adolf Hitler	Gay	The film depicts Adolf Hitler as a gay man.	United States
1974	The Nine Lives of Fritz the Cat	Lucifer	Gay	Lucifer, is portrayed as a flamboyant gay man who is looking for an earring that features a picture of Errol Flynn.	United States
1986	Project A-ko	B-ko Daitokuji	Bisexual	Although seemingly calm and poised in public, deferring to her teachers' authorities, B-ko is haughty and goes to great lengths to get what she wants. Her desire to steal C-ko's affection away from A-ko Magami develops into an obsession.	Japan
1990s
1994	Rocky & Hudson	Rocky	Gay	Protagonists Rocky and Hudson are openly gay cowboys. They are named after Rock Hudson.	Brazil
1994	Rocky & Hudson	Hudson	Gay	Protagonists Rocky and Hudson are openly gay cowboys. They are named after Rock Hudson.	Brazil
1996	Fake	Dee Laytner	Bisexual	Dee Laytner and Ryo Maclean are cops and partners who work in New York. Dee has deep feelings for Ryo and makes advances towards Ryo, who claims to be straight. Despite this, he has been shown to reciprocate his feelings and is jealous when JJ hits on Dee.	Japan
1996	Fake	Randy "Ryo" Maclean	Bisexual	Dee Laytner and Ryo Maclean are cops and partners who work in New York. Dee has deep feelings for Ryo and makes advances towards Ryo, who claims to be straight. Despite this, he has been shown to reciprocate his feelings and is jealous when JJ hits on Dee.	Japan
1999	South Park: Bigger, Longer & Uncut	Big Gay Al	Gay	In the series, Big Gay Al is a stereotypical homosexual man known for his flamboyant and cheery demeanor. In the movie, he sings: "Everything is super when you're gay!"	United States
1999	South Park: Bigger, Longer & Uncut	Saddam Hussein	Gay	Within the South Park series and film, Saddam Hussein and Satan are shown having a gay relationship in Hell. Hussein is depicted as wanting a more sexual relationship while Satan is shown as wanting an emotionally fulfilling partner.	United States
1999	South Park: Bigger, Longer & Uncut	Satan	Gay	Within the South Park series and film, Saddam Hussein and Satan are shown having a gay relationship in Hell. Hussein is depicted as wanting a more sexual relationship while Satan is shown as wanting an emotionally fulfilling partner.	United States
1999	Adolescence of Utena	Juri Arisugawa	Lesbian	Juri is explicitly in love with her female classmate, Shiori, in both the TV series and movie. She is described as "homosexual" by the creators in the DVD booklet. The commentary in the booklet indicated that Shiori also had feelings for her, but was too troubled and insecure to act on them in a healthy way.	Japan
1999	Adolescence of Utena	Utena Tenjou	Bisexual	When Utena arrives at Ohtori Academy as a transfer student, she hits on Wakaba. Later, Utena and Anthy flirt and kiss, more overt than in the Revolutionary Girl Utena anime and the associated manga. A kiss was included due to a decision from the film's director, Kunihiko Ikuhara. Like in the anime, Utena and Anthy, who are in love with each other, are both bisexual. In the anime, Anthy is engaged to an abusive man, Kyouichi Saionji, at the beginning of the series, and Akio has been sexually assaulting Anthy, while Utena is in love with Akio Ohtori as shown in episodes like "The Barefoot Girl." The film has become popular among fans of yuri (lesbian manga and anime), and is often categorized as LGBT cinema with some critics saying the film seeks "a rejection of dominant discourses of gender and sexuality" with the joining of the masculine Utena and the feminine Anthy being "an acknowledgement of the need for an integrate psyche, regardless of gender or sexual orientation."	Japan
1999	Adolescence of Utena	Anthy Himemiya	Bisexual		Japan
2000s
2000	Is It Fall Yet?	Alison	Bisexual	Alison tries to seduce her best friend Jane Lane, but Jane turns her down by making it clear she is heterosexual. The next day, Alison apologizes to Jane. The latter nearly accepts the advances until she realizes that Alison has slept with their male art camp teacher.	United States
2003	Tokyo Godfathers	Hana	Trans woman	Hana, a protagonist in the film, is a homeless trans woman who is flamboyant, dresses in the "most feminine clothes she can find," and searches for the mother of an abandoned baby.	Japan
2007	Persepolis	Various	Gay	Marjane lives for some time in a communal apartment with eight gay men in Vienna, Austria.	France
2007	Persepolis	Fernando	Gay	Marjane's boyfriend Fernando (named Enrique in the comic) reveals to her that he is gay. He thanks her because she helped him to discover his own sexuality. He states that if a relationship with her does not work out, it would not work with any other girl.	Iran
2009	Coraline	April Spink	Lesbian	April, a retired burlesque dancer who may know about magic and fairies, and Miriam, another retired burlesque actress, are lovers. On multiple occasions, Neil Gaiman, who wrote the 2002 novel the movie is based on, stated that they are an elderly couple and are together, relating to the many lesbians he put in his other works like Sandman, Death: The Time of Your Life, Neverwhere, American Gods, and Miracleman. He also confirmed that this was reflected in the movie, noting a review on the movie in 2009, stating that they had been called "thespians" in a Coraline musical in 2007, and stated that he did not call them a couple in the text because he wanted readers to have the same experience he had "with the couple that Spink and Forcible were based on."	United States
2009	Coraline	Miriam Forcible	Lesbian		United States
2009	Mary and Max	Damien Popodopoulos	Bisexual	Damien, a funny man who stutters, leaves his wife Mary, who was previously his neighbor, to be with his male pen friend in New Zealand. The two enter into a relationship. Director and writer Adam Elliot is gay.	Australia
2009	My Dog Tulip	J. R. Ackerley	Gay	The film is an adaptation of J. R. Ackerley's 1956 memoir of the same name. Ackerley was a gay man who was open about his sexuality. The film makes a few allusions to his sexuality.	United States
2010s
2010	The Drawn Together Movie: The Movie!	Captain Leslie Hero	Pansexual	Captain Hero, lecherous parody of Superman and other superheroes, is a "brawny classic cartoon superhero" who is shown to be sexually aroused, due to his erectile dysfunction, by an array of paraphilias like necrophilia and will have sex with anything and anyone. He and Foxxy Love form a brief BDSM relationship in one episode of the Drawn Together series which the movie is based on, "Requiem for a Reality Show", and as his gay alter ego Tim Tommerson, has an affair with Xandir in another episode, "Xandir and Tim, Sitting in a Tree".	United States
2010	The Drawn Together Movie: The Movie!	Foxxy Love	Bisexual	Foxxy, a "sexy mystery-solver" and a parody of Valerie Brown from Josie and the Pussycats, has relations with both men and women but preferably with the former. She makes out with Princess Clara in the show's first episode, and has a brief BDSM relationship with Captain Hero in another episode, "Requiem for a Reality Show".	United States
2010	The Drawn Together Movie: The Movie!	Xandir P. Whifflebottom	Gay	Xandir is a homosexual and effeminate video game platformer. He is thought to be straight when on a "never-ending quest to save his girlfriend" but is revealed to be gay, as first shown in the episode "Gay Bash" when the Wood Beast, a creature which bites off the arms of homosexual people, bites off his arm. He is also labeled as a "gay video game adventurer" in the first episode. Xandir is a parody of video game heroes such as Link from The Legend of Zelda series and Cloud Strife from Final Fantasy VII, and in another episode, "Xandir and Tim, Sitting in a Tree", he has an affair with Captain Hero's gay alter ego, Tim Tommerson.	United States
2012	Strange Frame	Parker	Lesbian	In the distant future, two women fall in love, but when Parker is taken away and enslaved by greedy businessmen, the Naia must save her, in this film which has been praised for its "hybrid of cut out and CGI animation" and has been described as possibly "the trippiest lesbian film ever made."	United States
2012	Strange Frame	Naia	Lesbian	In the distant future, two women fall in love, but when Parker is taken away and enslaved by greedy businessmen, the Naia must save her, in this film which has been praised for its "hybrid of cut out and CGI animation" and has been described as possibly "the trippiest lesbian film ever made."	United States
2012	ParaNorman	Mitch Downe	Gay	Courtney has a crush on Mitch and invites him to watch a horror movie. She, however, discovers that he is gay and already in a relationship when he says, "You know, you're gonna love my boyfriend. He's like a total chick flick nut!" Co-director Chris Butler said that the character's sexual orientation was explicitly connected with the film's message: "If we're saying to anyone that watches this movie don't judge other people, then we've got to have the strength of our convictions."	United States
2012	Foodfight!	Vlad Chocool	Gay	During Dex Dogtective's investigation of Sunshine's disappearance and the arrival of Brand X, he meets with Vlad Chocool, an Ike similar to Count Chocula. He is heavily attracted to Dex's sidekick Daredevil Dan due to him being made of chocolate, which makes Dan uncomfortable. The character was criticized for being a gay stereotype.	United States
2014	Bodacious Space Pirates: Abyss of Hyperspace	Jenny Dolittle	Lesbian	Jenny and Lynn are president and vice president of the Space Yacht Club but are also lesbian lovers. They also appear in the middle of the series this film is branched off, titled Bodacious Space Pirates.	Japan
2014	Bodacious Space Pirates: Abyss of Hyperspace	Lynn Lambretta	Lesbian	Jenny and Lynn are president and vice president of the Space Yacht Club but are also lesbian lovers. They also appear in the middle of the series this film is branched off, titled Bodacious Space Pirates.	Japan
2015	Harmony	Miach Mihie	Lesbian	Miach passionately kisses Tuan during the movie. It is also shown throughout the movie that they are romantically involved with one another.	Japan
2015	Harmony	Tuan Kirie	Lesbian	Miach passionately kisses Tuan during the movie. It is also shown throughout the movie that they are romantically involved with one another.	Japan
2016	Doukyusei: Classmates	Hikaru Kusakabe	Gay	The two main characters slowly fall in love with each other after Hikaru helps Rihito with choir practice. Hikaru is musically inclined and hopes to get a job in the music industry.	Japan
2016	Doukyusei: Classmates	Rihito Saijou	Gay	The two main characters slowly fall in love with each other after Hikaru helps Rihito with choir practice. Hikaru is musically inclined and hopes to get a job in the music industry.	Japan
2016	Batman: The Killing Joke	Reese	Gay	Reese is a character who only appears in the animated adaptation. He is Barbara Gordon's college friend. This character was criticized for being a gay stereotype and having no actual depth. Reese is voiced by gay and non-binary actor JP Karliak.	United States
2016	Sausage Party	Teresa Del Taco	Lesbian	Teresa is a Mexican lesbian taco who has a crush on Brenda, a hot dog bun from an eight-bun package of Glamour Buns who is Frank's love interest.	United States-Canada
2016	Sausage Party	Kareem Abdul Lavash	Gay	Though enemies at first, Kareem and Sammy eventually form a relationship. Kareem and Sammy appeared in Sausage Party: Foodtopia in where their relationship ends in tragedy as Kareem is killed off.	United States-Canada
2016	Sausage Party	Sammy Bagel Jr.	Gay	Though enemies at first, Kareem and Sammy eventually form a relationship. Kareem and Sammy appeared in Sausage Party: Foodtopia in where their relationship ends in tragedy as Kareem is killed off.	United States-Canada
2016	Storks	Various couples	Lesbian	Near the end of the film, the storks deliver babies to straight, lesbian and gay couples, and single parents.	United States
2016	Storks	Various couples	Gay	Near the end of the film, the storks deliver babies to straight, lesbian and gay couples, and single parents.	United States
2018	Kase-san	Yui Yamada	Lesbian	Yui Yamada, a timid girl who enjoys tending her school's gardens, falls in love with the boyish and athletic Tomoka Kase. The two eventually begin dating, and the story follows the pair as they face various challenges in their relationship, as depicted in the five-minute "Your Light ~Kase-san and Morning Glories" film, and the 58-minute "Kase-san and Morning Glories" film.	Japan
2018	Kase-san	Tomoka Kase	Lesbian	Yui Yamada, a timid girl who enjoys tending her school's gardens, falls in love with the boyish and athletic Tomoka Kase. The two eventually begin dating, and the story follows the pair as they face various challenges in their relationship, as depicted in the five-minute "Your Light ~Kase-san and Morning Glories" film, and the 58-minute "Kase-san and Morning Glories" film.	Japan
2018	Marvel Rising: Secret Warriors	America Chavez	Lesbian	Chavez is a Latina, and lesbian, superheroine who has two mothers, Elena and Amalia Chavez, who sacrifice themselves to save her in the film. She is voiced by Cierra Ramirez, who is of Colombian and Mexican descent and voices Chavez throughout the Marvel Rising media franchise.	United States
2019	Promare	Galo Thymos	Gay	Galo and Lio start out at opposing sides: the first as a member of Burning Rescue, a "firefighting" unit that seeks to contain combustions caused by the Burnish, who are a group of humans who developed pyrokinetic abilities; and the second Mad Burnish, a group of radicalized Burnish. In a confrontation, Galo manages to capture Lio, as part of a Burnish plan to be intentionally imprisoned and then help set free others of their kind who are under state custody. As planned, Lio breaks free and ends up capturing Galo. During his imprisonment Galo starts to see the conflict with the Burnish from their perspective. As the two fight together, Lio is almost brought down by Kray, Galo's former boss, but is brought back to life by Galo in what is technically a mouth-to-mouth magic technique but contains all the undertones of a romantic kiss. A romantic bond between the pair is hinted at in other moments, such as when the two men combine their powers and produce an explosion that causes a giant, heart-shaped smoke to rise; and when Galo rebuffs a woman's attempt to kiss him to be with Lio.	Japan
2019	Promare	Lio Fotia	Gay		Japan
2019	Toy Story 4	Unnamed couples	Lesbian	A scene from the film shows a couple of lesbian mothers with a child at a kindergarten orientation. Despite being somewhat brief on screen, this prompted One Million Moms, a conservative group in the United States, to call for a boycott of Toy Story 4.	United States
2019	KonoSuba: God's Blessing on this Wonderful World! Legend of Crimson	Sylvia	Trans woman	Sylvia is a chimera and one of the eight generals of the Demon King who served as the primary antagonist of the Konosuba Movie. As a chimera, Sylvia possessed traits typically unique to both males and females. She had the breasts and figure of a woman, but also had male features which could not be picked up on as easily, such as male genitalia. However, through the movie only female pronouns were used to refer to her and she was only referred to as a woman, her male genitalia was only mentioned in a comedic scene some viewers and reviewers consider transphobic.	Japan
2019	Steven Universe: The Movie (Note: This is not an exhaustive list. As many of the characters may also be found in the Steven Universe series, additional characters may be found in the page: List of animated series with LGBT characters: 2010–2014)	Ruby	Lesbian	Ruby and Sapphire are a married lesbian couple who spend most of their time fused into one being as Garnet, marrying in the episode "Reunited." In the film, after Spinel rides in to Earth on a planet-destroying weapons and attacks Steven Universe and the other three Crystal Gems (Pearl, Garnet, and Amethyst), causing all them to be "rejuvenated" into their original forms. As Pearl and Amethyst are left with a sort of amnesia, Garnet splits into her component pieces: Ruby and Sapphire. While Steven works with his friends to bring back the memories of Pearl and Amethyst, he also recreates the moment which brought Ruby and Sapphire together into Garnet, and is successful in restoring Garnet first to "cotton candy" form, then to her original self. Garnet also sings a song about love, titled "Isn't It Love?".	United States
2019	Steven Universe: The Movie	Sapphire	Lesbian		United States
2019	Steven Universe: The Movie	Pearl	Lesbian	In the original Steven Universe series, it is very apparent that Pearl, a female-presenting non-binary Gem, is attracted to another Gem named Rose Quartz, her now-deceased leader. Her feelings are shown to be romantic and reciprocated by Rose, who is later shown to be Pink Diamond. As a result of Spinel's rejuvenator, Pearl is sent back to factory settings and put in a form of amnesia. In the process, Amethyst and Steven work together to get her memories back, including Amethyst transforming into Rose, who she calls Pearl's "love of her life." While this is not successful, Steven later succeeds by fusing with his father, into Steg, causing Pearl to come back to her original self.	United States
2019	Fragtime	Misuzu Moritani	Lesbian	Misuzu is shown to have romantic feelings (which later develops into a sexual obsession) for Haruka, a popular girl in her class. Haruka is the only other person who is aware of Misuzu's ability, hence why she was able to discover Misuzu's closeted lesbianism.	Japan
2019	Fragtime	Haruka Murakami	Lesbian	Misuzu is shown to have romantic feelings (which later develops into a sexual obsession) for Haruka, a popular girl in her class. Haruka is the only other person who is aware of Misuzu's ability, hence why she was able to discover Misuzu's closeted lesbianism.	Japan
2020s
2020	Twittering Birds Never Fly – The Clouds Gather'	Yashiro	Gay	Yashiro is a masochist and yakuza boss warms up to his new bodyguard, Chikara Doumeki. As his entreaties fail, he discovers why his bodyguard only wants to stay at "arm's length" to himself, rather than get involved in a relationship. An anime film with these characters was released on February 15, 2020, titled Twittering Birds Never Fly – The Clouds Gather while an OAD was released on March 1, 2021, titled Twittering Birds Never Fly – Don't Stay Gold. There are two upcoming films, one of which is titled Twittering Birds Never Fly – The Storm Breaks.	Japan
2020	Onward	Officer Specter	Lesbian	Officer Specter briefly appears in the film and in one scene she discusses her girlfriend's daughter pulling her hair out. She is voiced by Lena Waithe, a lesbian actress.	
2020	Superman: Red Son	Wonder Woman	Bisexual	Wonder Woman's bisexuality is shown in the film.	United States
2020	Given	Haruki Nakayama	Gay	Haruki has a longstanding crush on Akihiko, and resents his relationship with Ugetsu. Akihiko has had relationships with women and men and is experienced in matters of love and romance, as was the case in the anime series which aired in 2019. He lives with his ex-boyfriend Ugetsu, which whom he maintains a strictly physical relationship.	Japan
2020	Given	Akihiko Kaji	Bisexual	Haruki has a longstanding crush on Akihiko, and resents his relationship with Ugetsu. Akihiko has had relationships with women and men and is experienced in matters of love and romance, as was the case in the anime series which aired in 2019. He lives with his ex-boyfriend Ugetsu, which whom he maintains a strictly physical relationship.	Japan
2020	Given	Ugetsu Murata	Gay	Haruki has a longstanding crush on Akihiko, and resents his relationship with Ugetsu. Akihiko has had relationships with women and men and is experienced in matters of love and romance, as was the case in the anime series which aired in 2019. He lives with his ex-boyfriend Ugetsu, which whom he maintains a strictly physical relationship.	Japan
2020	L'étranger de la Plage	Mio	Gay	Mio, a high school boy whose parents died at a young age, meets an up-and-coming novelist and gay man, Shun, who lives near his house on a remote Okinawan island. Although they grow closer, Mio has to leave, and he recognizes his feelings three years later.	Japan
2020	L'étranger de la Plage	Shun	Gay	Mio, a high school boy whose parents died at a young age, meets an up-and-coming novelist and gay man, Shun, who lives near his house on a remote Okinawan island. Although they grow closer, Mio has to leave, and he recognizes his feelings three years later.	Japan
2020	Burn the Witch	Macy Baljure	Lesbian	Macy is in love with Ninny Spancole and is hostile toward anyone she views as being too friendly with her, including Ninny's work partner, and fellow witch, Noel Niihashi.	Japan
2020	Happy-Go-Lucky Days	Yuri	Lesbian	In the film's first segment, "Happy," a woman attended the wedding of a girl she kissed in high school named Yuri, and at the meeting she meets another woman who declares she is "also in love with Yuri".	Japan
2020	Happy-Go-Lucky Days	Male admirer	Gay	In the film's second segment, a male teacher at a high school, Sawa, "receives a love confession from one of his former charges," but does nothing about it, and is later introduced to a man who bears a strong resemblance to the person who made the confession.	Japan
2021	The Mitchells vs. the Machines	Katie Mitchell	Lesbian (Note: While Katie never directly calls herself a lesbian in the film, Rianda and Rowe says she "likes girls," supporting the contention by reviewers that she is lesbian)	The film's writers, Michael Rianda and Jeff Rowe, wrote the character of Katie to be LGBT but without necessarily drawing attention to her sexuality, while Abbi Jacobson, a bisexual actress who voices Katie, affirmed her character is "queer". Katie wears a rainbow pride flag pin on her jacket and talks about it taking a while to figure herself out, and at the end of the film, she has a girlfriend at film school in Los Angeles named Jade. The film was nominated for a GLAAD Award for Outstanding Film - Wide Release. Katie will return in the sequel.	United States
2021	Flee	Amin Nawabi	Gay	The film is an animated documentary that centers on director Jonas Poher Rasmussen's friend Amin, a refugee who is about to marry his husband. The film was nominated for a GLAAD Award for Outstanding Documentary.	United States-United Kingdom-France-Sweden-Norway-Denmark
2022	Catwoman: Hunted	Catwoman	Bisexual	At one point, Catwoman flirts with Batwoman in an attempt to escape. Batwoman is voiced by bisexual actress Stephanie Beatriz.	United States-Japan
2022	Catwoman: Hunted	Batwoman	Lesbian	At one point, Catwoman flirts with Batwoman in an attempt to escape. Batwoman is voiced by bisexual actress Stephanie Beatriz.	United States-Japan
2022	Turning Red	Priya Mangal	Queer	Priya is one of Meilin's friends. She is seen dancing with a goth girl at a party. Priya was confirmed to be queer by Pixar layout artist and cultural trustee Andrea Goh.	United States
2022	Lightyear	Alisha Hawthorne	Lesbian	Alisha Hawthorne was a member of Star Command and one of the grandmothers of Izzy Hawthorne. She was married to another woman Kiko Hawthorne. Their same-sex kiss was originally removed but as since been reinstated due to the backlash towards Bob Chapek's response to Florida Parental Rights in Education Act and the internal uproar within The Walt Disney Company. The film was nominated for a GLAAD Media Award for Outstanding Film - Wide Release.	United States
2022	Lightyear	Kiko Hawthorne	Lesbian	Alisha Hawthorne was a member of Star Command and one of the grandmothers of Izzy Hawthorne. She was married to another woman Kiko Hawthorne. Their same-sex kiss was originally removed but as since been reinstated due to the backlash towards Bob Chapek's response to Florida Parental Rights in Education Act and the internal uproar within The Walt Disney Company. The film was nominated for a GLAAD Media Award for Outstanding Film - Wide Release.	United States
2022	DC League of Super-Pets	Nancy	Lesbian	A dog notes that his owner, Nancy, used to exclusively pay attention to him until she got hitched to her fiancée. During this conversation, the movie shows Nancy speaking to her unnamed fiancée.	United States
2022	Trick or Treat Scooby-Doo!	Velma Dinkley	Lesbian	In the film, Velma has a crush on monster designer Coco Diablo. Coco reciprocates it. Velma had been previously portrayed as a lesbian in Scooby-Doo! Mystery Incorporated. The film was nominated for a GLAAD Media Award for Outstanding Kids & Family Programming.	United States
2022	Trick or Treat Scooby-Doo!	Coco Diablo	Lesbian	In the film, Velma has a crush on monster designer Coco Diablo. Coco reciprocates it. Velma had been previously portrayed as a lesbian in Scooby-Doo! Mystery Incorporated. The film was nominated for a GLAAD Media Award for Outstanding Kids & Family Programming.	United States
2022	Wendell & Wild	Raúl Cocolotl	Trans man	Raúl is a transgender boy in an all-girls Catholic school. He is one of Kat's very few friends. He is the first transgender male character in a major animated film. Raúl is voiced by transgender actor Sam Zelaya. The film was nominated for a GLAAD Media Award for Outstanding Film – Limited Release.	United States
2022	Strange World	Ethan Clade	Gay	Ethan Clade is the son of Searcher and Meridian Clade. He is shown to have a crush on a boy named Diazo. Ethan is the first gay lead character in a Disney animated film. Ethan Clade is voiced by gay comedian Jaboukie Young-White. The film was nominated for a GLAAD Media Award for Outstanding Film - Wide Release.	United States
2022	Strange World	Diazo	Gay	Ethan Clade is the son of Searcher and Meridian Clade. He is shown to have a crush on a boy named Diazo. Ethan is the first gay lead character in a Disney animated film. Ethan Clade is voiced by gay comedian Jaboukie Young-White. The film was nominated for a GLAAD Media Award for Outstanding Film - Wide Release.	United States
2023	Elemental	Lake Ripple	Non-binary	Lake Ripple is Wade and Alan's sibling. Lake uses they/them and she/her pronouns. Lake is Pixar's first non-binary character. Lake is voiced by non-binary actor Kai Ava Hauser.	United States
2023	Elemental	Ghibli	Queer	Ghibli is Lake's girlfriend. The character was named after the Japanese anime studio Studio Ghibli.	United States
2023	The Missing	Eric	Gay	Eric is a mouthless animator in the Philippines, who has found a boy he likes.	Philippines
2023	Nimona	Ballister Blackheart	Gay	Ballister Blackheart is a former knight who was kicked out after losing his arm in a joust. He and another knight Ambrosius Goldenloin have feelings for each other. The film was originally scrapped by Disney due to a same-sex kiss. It was eventually rescued by Annapurna Pictures. Ambrosius Goldenloin is voiced by gay internet celebrity Eugene Lee Yang. The film was nominated for a GLAAD Media Award for Outstanding Kids & Family Programming or Film (Animated).	United States
2023	Nimona	Ambrosius Goldenloin	Gay	Ballister Blackheart is a former knight who was kicked out after losing his arm in a joust. He and another knight Ambrosius Goldenloin have feelings for each other. The film was originally scrapped by Disney due to a same-sex kiss. It was eventually rescued by Annapurna Pictures. Ambrosius Goldenloin is voiced by gay internet celebrity Eugene Lee Yang. The film was nominated for a GLAAD Media Award for Outstanding Kids & Family Programming or Film (Animated).	United States
2023	Ruby Gillman, Teenage Kraken	Margot	Queer	Margot is Ruby Gillman's best friend. Margot is revealed to be queer as she asks out a girl to go to prom with her.	United States
2023	Justice League x RWBY: Super Heroes & Huntsmen--Part One	Yang Xiao Long	Queer	In the Volume 9 episode, "Confessions Within Cumulonimbus Clouds", of RWBY, the animated series that the film is based on, she accepts the feelings of fellow huntress Blake Belladonna and both kiss. Film director Kerry Shawcross said they added it into the film because it was "something that we liked", adding that this is "before Bumblebee is a thing" and noted that Blake and Yang had "a lot" they could relate to and talk about with Wonder Woman, noting that it was "natural to throw in a couple of those moments."	United States
2023	Justice League x RWBY: Super Heroes & Huntsmen--Part One	Blake Belladonna	Bisexual	In the film, there is romantic subtext showing that Yang and Blake have feelings for one another, as confirmed by film director Kerry Shawcross. In the RWBY series, Blake is bisexual, as her voice actress Arryn Zech confirmed, as she had a previous relationship with her abusive boyfriend, Adam Taurus. and in the RWBY episode "Confessions Within Cumulonimbus Clouds", she accepts the feelings of Yang, who she also has feelings for, and kisses her.	United States
2024	Bouchra	Bouchra	Lesbian	Bouchra, a coyote, is a Moroccan filmmaker living in New York City. Although her mother loves her, she did not support Bouchra when she came out to her. Now she is trying to reconcile with her mother.	Italy, Morocco, United States
2024	Bouchra	Nikki	Lesbian	Nikki is a cow and Bouchra's ex-girlfriend.	Italy, Morocco, United States
2024	Bouchra	Lamia	Lesbian	Lamia is a Moroccan bear and Bouchra's love interest.	Italy, Morocco, United States
2024	Memoir of a Snail	Gilbert Pudel	Gay	Gilbert Pudel is Grace's older twin brother. Gilbert was sent to live with a family of religious fundamentalists in Perth. His foster parents mistreat him for being gay.	Australia
2024	Maxxie LaWow: Drag Super-Shero	Simon/Maxxie LaWow	Gay	Simon is a shy barista who transforms into a drag queen superhero.	United States
2025	Senpai wa Otokonoko: Clear After the Rain	Saki Aoi	Queer	This film is a continuation of the series, Senpai Is an Otokonoko, in which Saki is a high school student who is in love with her senior named Makoto. Although her exact sexuality is never stated, she openly admits that her crush's gender makes no difference to her when it is revealed that Makoto is actually a boy and not a girl.	Japan
2025	Senpai wa Otokonoko: Clear After the Rain	Ryuji Taiga	Queer	In the series "Senpai Is an Otokonoko", for which this film is a continuation, Ryuji is a high school boy who has a crush on his male childhood best friend, Makoto. Although he repeatedly explores his feelings and the potential impact of Makoto's femininity on his attraction to him throughout the story, Ryuji eventually admits that he loves Makoto as an other boy despite his androgyny.	Japan
2025	Lesbian Space Princess	Saira	Lesbian	Saira, is an alien space princess who sets off to rescue her girlfriend Kiki from the Straight White Maliens. She also has two moms Queen Leanne and Queen Anne (voiced by transgender comedian Jordan Raskopoulos and lesbian comedian Madeleine Sami). At some point in the film, Saira briefly dates Willow.	Australia
2025	Lesbian Space Princess	Kiki	Lesbian	Saira, is an alien space princess who sets off to rescue her girlfriend Kiki from the Straight White Maliens. She also has two moms Queen Leanne and Queen Anne (voiced by transgender comedian Jordan Raskopoulos and lesbian comedian Madeleine Sami). At some point in the film, Saira briefly dates Willow.	Australia
2025	Lesbian Space Princess	Willow	Non-binary	Willow is a former gay-pop idol. Willow is also non-binary.	Australia
2025	Fixed	Frankie	Intersex	Frankie is an intersex Dobermann. Frankie is voiced by intersex rights activist and trans, non-binary, and queer actor River Gallo.	United States
2025	Fixed	Lucky	Queer	Frankie is an intersex Dobermann. Frankie is voiced by intersex rights activist and trans, non-binary, and queer actor River Gallo.	United States
2026	Zsazsa Zaturnnah vs. the Amazonistas of Planet X	Ada	Gay	The film centers on Ada, a gay salon owner who transforms into a voluptuous superheroine Zsazsa.	Philippines-France
2026	Jim Queen	Jim Queen	Gay	The film centers on Jim Queen, a popular gay influencer in Paris whose life is turned upside down when a mysterious virus, Heterosis, turns gay men straight.	France
2026	Jim Queen	Lucien	Gay	Lucien is a young man struggling to accept himself. He has a crush on Jim Queen.	France
2026	Tangles	Sarah Leavitt	Lesbian	Sarah is a Jewish lesbian dealing with her mother's Alzheimer's disease. The film is an adaptation of Sarah Leavitt's 2010 autobiographical graphic novel Tangles: A Story About Alzheimer's, My Mother and Me. Sarah is voiced by bisexual actress Abbi Jacobson.	United States, Canada

== Short films ==
Years	Title	Character	Identity	Notes	Country
1971	Thank You Mask Man	The Lone Ranger	Gay	In this cartoon, The Lone Ranger and Tonto are depicted as lovers.	United States
1995	Achilles	Achilles	Bisexual	Achilles and Patroclus are depicted as lovers in this short film.	United Kingdom
1995	Achilles	Patroclus	Gay	Achilles and Patroclus are depicted as lovers in this short film.	United Kingdom
1996	Adam	Adam	Trans man	In this tender claymation short film, a little girl is mistaken for a boy and relishes the opportunity.	United States
2003	Apples and Oranges	Anta's Moms	Lesbian	The first segment "Anta's Revenge" features Anta's two mothers. Anta is bullied for having two moms.	Canada
2003	Apples and Oranges	Jeroux	Gay	In the second segment "Defying Gravity", Jeroux is a skateboarder who comes out as gay.	Canada
2004	John and Michael	John	Gay	Two men with Down's syndrome share a loving relationship.	Canada
2004	John and Michael	Michael	Gay	Two men with Down's syndrome share a loving relationship.	Canada
2004	Two Lovely Maids	Mei	Lesbian	A short yuri animation by Naoya Ishikawa, the creator of Kuttsukiboshi. Mei and Idid are two maids who come from outer space to protect Earth as well as a girl Izumi. They are openly a lesbian couple.	Japan
2004	Two Lovely Maids	Idid	Lesbian	A short yuri animation by Naoya Ishikawa, the creator of Kuttsukiboshi. Mei and Idid are two maids who come from outer space to protect Earth as well as a girl Izumi. They are openly a lesbian couple.	Japan
2008	The Butterfly from Ural	Gustaf Mannerheim	Gay	A short film about the former president of Finland and his lover. The short caused an uproar in Finland due to the film's portrayal of Mannerheim.	Finland
2008	The Butterfly from Ural	Butterfly	Gay	A short film about the former president of Finland and his lover. The short caused an uproar in Finland due to the film's portrayal of Mannerheim.	Finland
2010	A Kiss for the Petals: Becoming your Lover	Mai Sawaguchi	Lesbian	This story follows Mai and Reo after they confess their love to one another.	Japan
2010	A Kiss for the Petals: Becoming your Lover	Reo Kawamura	Lesbian	This story follows Mai and Reo after they confess their love to one another.	Japan
2013	Angel's Drop	Botan	Lesbian	Botan and Shinobu are romantically involved. The story follows the couple's adventure in a new school filled with angels.	Japan
2013	Angel's Drop	Shinobu	Lesbian	Botan and Shinobu are romantically involved. The story follows the couple's adventure in a new school filled with angels.	Japan
2015	Prince Henry	Henry	Gay	A gay fairytale romance story aimed at younger audiences. Prince Henry's parents invite all the eligible princes and princesses in the land so that Henry may choose one of them to marry. However, Prince Henry is already in love with his servant Thomas. Class issues rather than sexuality prove discriminating factors.	United Kingdom
2015	Prince Henry	Thomas	Gay	A gay fairytale romance story aimed at younger audiences. Prince Henry's parents invite all the eligible princes and princesses in the land so that Henry may choose one of them to marry. However, Prince Henry is already in love with his servant Thomas. Class issues rather than sexuality prove discriminating factors.	United Kingdom
2016	I Like Girls	Charlotte	Lesbian	An adaptation of Diane Obonsawin's 2014 graphic novel On Loving Women; the short is a collection of four stories that centered on lesbian romance.	Canada
2016	I Like Girls	Mathilde	Lesbian	An adaptation of Diane Obonsawin's 2014 graphic novel On Loving Women; the short is a collection of four stories that centered on lesbian romance.	Canada
2016	I Like Girls	Marie	Lesbian	An adaptation of Diane Obonsawin's 2014 graphic novel On Loving Women; the short is a collection of four stories that centered on lesbian romance.	Canada
2016	I Like Girls	Diane	Lesbian	An adaptation of Diane Obonsawin's 2014 graphic novel On Loving Women; the short is a collection of four stories that centered on lesbian romance.	Canada
2017	In a Heartbeat	Sherwin	Gay	A closeted boy's heart pops out of his chest to chase Jonathan, the boy of his dreams. Sherwin fears being identified as gay.	United States
2017	In a Heartbeat	Jonathan	Gay	A closeted boy's heart pops out of his chest to chase Jonathan, the boy of his dreams. Sherwin fears being identified as gay.	United States
2017	Manivald	Manivald	Gay	He is a fox in his early 30s who is trying to find love.	Canada-Croatia-Estonia
2017	Manivald	Toomas	Bisexual	Toomas is a wolf repairman and the object of Manivald and his mother's affection. However, it is revealed that he is married to a woman named Vivi and they have two kids with a third one on the way. This is expanded upon in the 2019 follow-up film Toomas Beneath the Valley of the Wild Wolves in which he becomes a gigolo after getting fired from his job but he hides it from his family.	Canada-Croatia-Estonia
2017	Soggy Flakes	Dr. Bird Berry	Trans woman	She was the mascot of Berry Delicious before she got a PhD and transitioned.	Canada
2017	Soggy Flakes	Captain Kale	Gay	The mascot of Kale Flakes. He was in a relationship with Dr. Bird Berry before Bird Berry transitioned.	Canada
2019	Shannon Amen	Shannon	Lesbian	The film is a tribute to Shannon Jamieson, a friend and creative collaborator of the filmmaker who committed suicide after being unable to accept her sexuality.	Canada
2020	Out	Greg	Gay	The short Pixar film revolves around Greg attempting to hide a framed photo of him and his boyfriend Manuel from his parents, out of fear for their disapproval. The seventh short film in the SparkShorts series, it is both Disney's and Pixar's first short to feature a gay main character and storyline, including an on-screen same-sex kiss. The film was directed and written by Steven Clay Hunter, an openly gay animator.	United States
2020	Out	Manuel	Gay	The short Pixar film revolves around Greg attempting to hide a framed photo of him and his boyfriend Manuel from his parents, out of fear for their disapproval. The seventh short film in the SparkShorts series, it is both Disney's and Pixar's first short to feature a gay main character and storyline, including an on-screen same-sex kiss. The film was directed and written by Steven Clay Hunter, an openly gay animator.	United States
2020	Cwch Deilen (Note: Also known as "Leaf Boat.")	Heledd	Lesbian	Heledd and Celyn are two people who try to navigate the "scary, murky waters" of their relationship, learning to trust each other and overcome their fears. This film was originally presented at the 2020 Anima Pride event, part of the Animasyros film festival in Greece.	United Kingdom
2020	Cwch Deilen	Celyn	Lesbian	Heledd and Celyn are two people who try to navigate the "scary, murky waters" of their relationship, learning to trust each other and overcome their fears. This film was originally presented at the 2020 Anima Pride event, part of the Animasyros film festival in Greece.	United Kingdom
2021	Brianna	Brianna	Bisexual	In this animated film, Brianna is committed to make sure every Black, and bisexual, woman has enough confidence to feel they are "good enough."	United States
2021	Cal	Cal	Trans man	In this animated film, Cal comes out as a trans man to his family, throwing a ceremony, and party, for his new identity and name.	United States
2021	Cheyenne	Cheyenne	Genderfluid	Cheyenne, in this film, expresses her gender identity through cosplaying and creating her own LGBTQ characters through shipping them with other characters.	United States
2021	Juliana	Juliana's mom	Queer	In this film, Juliana has a queer mom and works to tell the LGBTQ community she is "an ally who understands what it is like to feel 'different.'"	United States
2021	Ken	Ken	Non-binary	In this animated film, holding hands with their girlfriend in a public place is an intimate form of love for Ken.	United States
2021	Logan	Logan	Bisexual	Logan struggles to figure out her sexual and gender identity, creating her own way of defining what it means to be a woman and to be bisexual.	United States
2021	Sarah	Sarah	Bisexual	In this animated film, Sarah is pressured by her friends to "find out" whether she is straight or gay after she gets a crush on Keira Knightley.	United States
2021	Vivi	Vivi	Lesbian	In this animated film, she explores her new identity, finding support at school to "help her live her best, out, queer life."	United States
2021	Will	Will	Gay	After the homophobia at his high school seems never-ending, Will's mom comes up with an idea to change that.	United States
2021	Zion	Zion	Lesbian	This animated film focuses on the gender and sexual identity of Zion.	United States
2023	Aikane	Advisor	Gay	This animated film is about a same-sex relationship between two Native Hawaiian men. Two of the co-directors Dean Hamer and Daniel Sousa are a same-sex couple.	United States
2023	Aikane	Warrior	Gay	This animated film is about a same-sex relationship between two Native Hawaiian men. Two of the co-directors Dean Hamer and Daniel Sousa are a same-sex couple.	United States
2023	My Parent Neal	Neal	Trans man	An animated documentary short that is about director Hannah Saidner's parent Neal who transitioned at the age of 62.	United States
2023	Pete	Pete	Lesbian	Pete, is a gender non-conforming girl who is part of a baseball team. The animated short is based on the childhood of director Bret Parker's wife Pete Barma. Barma also voices as herself.	United States
2023	Pacemaker	Cody Jackson	Trans man	Cody, is a transgender boy who has a crush on a girl. His grandfather is still trying to get used to his gender identity. Cody is voiced by non-binary and gay actor and singer Alex Newell.	United States
2024	Dragfox	Sam	Non-binary	Sam is a non-binary child struggling with their identity.	United Kingdom
2024	Inkwo for When the Starving Return	Dove	Genderfluid	Dove is a shapeshifting orphan who can change gender at will.	Canada
2024	Luz Diabla	Martin	Gay	Martin, is a flamboyant gay man who makes out with multiple men.	Canada-Argentina
2025	Two Black Boys in Paradise	Eden	Gay	Eden and Dula are a black same-sex teenage couple who go on a journey of self-acceptance. The short is based on a poem by Dean Atta who is gay.	United Kingdom
2025	Two Black Boys in Paradise	Dula	Gay	Eden and Dula are a black same-sex teenage couple who go on a journey of self-acceptance. The short is based on a poem by Dean Atta who is gay.	United Kingdom
2025	18 Months	Pete Mercurio	Gay	The short film is based on the true story of a male same-sex white couple who adopted an African-American infant in the early 2000s.	United States
2025	18 Months	Danny Stewart	Gay	The short film is based on the true story of a male same-sex white couple who adopted an African-American infant in the early 2000s.	United States

== See also ==
- List of animated series with LGBT characters
- List of graphic art works with LGBT characters
- List of yaoi anime and manga
- List of yuri works
- LGBTQ themes in anime and manga
- LGBTQ themes in Western animation
- Lists of television programs with LGBT characters
