= Kuttsukiboshi =

2010 original video animation

- Logo of Kuttsukiboshi

くっつきぼし
- Genre: Yuri, fantasy, romance
- Original video animation
- Directed by: Naoya Ishikawa
- Studio: Primastea
- Released: August 16, 2010 – May 11, 2012
- Episodes: 2

Kuttsukiboshi (くっつきぼし; lit. Stars Intertwined) is a two-part original video animation, written, directed and entirely animated by freelance animator Naoya Ishikawa. It is produced by Primastea (Isshoni Training, Isshoni Sleeping), with music composed by Shunsuke Morita and soundtrack produced by Dax Production. The first OVA, while officially released on August 16, 2010, was sold by Primastea at their Comiket78 booth; the second episode was originally planned for summer 2011, but its release was pushed back to May 11, 2012. The ending theme for the first part is "First Love Acceleration Space" (初恋加速空間, Hatsukoi Kasoku Kūkan) by Asami Imai whilst the ending theme for the second part is "My 71%" (私の71%, Watashi no Nanajūichi Pāsento) by Ikumi.

== Plot ==
Part 1
Kiiko Kawakami is a high school girl who secretly has telekinetic powers. The only person who knows of this is her friend, Aaya Saitō, who she has a crush on. One day after Aaya helps train her to use her powers, Kiiko leans in to kiss a sleeping Aaya, but she is surprised to find her taking the initiative and kissing her back. The two decide to have a risky rendezvous inside the empty school, and spend various summer memories together having sex in different places where no one knew about their love for each other. One day though, when Kiiko leaves her cellphone at Aaya's house after sleeping over, she returns to find Aaya having sex with her brother, Kōta, who is a famous artist.
Part 2
Aaya kidnaps Kiiko and keeps her in the gym storage and rapes her after learning what she did. After being let go, Kiiko is still unwilling to forgive Aaya. Some time later, after Aaya learns of her brother's death, she brings Kiiko to her house, asking her to make love with her one more time before she leaves Japan. That night, Kiiko gets a glimpse of Aaya's memories in which she learns that Kōta had a terminal disease and manipulated Aaya into having sex with him before his operation, where he died. As Kiiko realizes the truth and finds Aaya is gone, her powers bring her straight to her, now knowing she can teleport and look into the past and future, and where she expresses her desire to have Aaya by her side forever. Reconciling their feelings, the two warp away together off the plane and end up on a distant planet where they express their wish to spend their lives together.

== Characters ==
Kiiko Kawakami (川上紀衣子, Kawakami Kiiko)
Voiced by: Asami Imai
A brown haired girl and the classmate and friend of Aaya Saitō. After an accident, she exhibited supernatural powers such as psychokinesis. She is in love with Aaya, but did not have the courage to tell her in the beginning.
Aaya Saitō (斉藤亜綾, Saitō Āya)
Voiced by: Miku Isshiki
A blonde haired girl and the classmate and friend of Kiiko. She likes to perform experiments with Kiiko's powers, but in reality she is in love with her. She usually takes the lead when it comes to activities and has an outgoing personality. She lives with her brother.
Kōta Saitō (斉藤 康太, Saitō Kōta)
Voiced by: Naoki Koshida
Aaya's older brother, a famous artist who has generally seen Aaya as more than a sister. He had a terminal disease and manipulated Aaya into having sex with him before going in for his operation where he died.
