= Baby (surname) =

Baby is a surname. Notable people with the surname include:

- Benoît Baby (born 1983), French rugby union footballer
- François Baby (politician) (1768–1852), political figure in Upper Canada
- François Baby (businessman) (1733–1820), Canadian businessman
- François Baby (legislative councillor) (1794–1864), seigneur, businessman, and legislative councillor
- Jacques Baby (1731–1789), Canadian fur trader
- James Baby (1763–1863), Canadian politician and judge, and son of Jacques Baby
- Jean Baptiste Baby (1770–1852), Canadian politician and businessman, and son of Jacques Baby
- K. J. Baby (born 1954), Indian writer and film director
- Louis François Georges Baby (1832–1906), Canadian politician and judge
- M. A. Baby (born 1954), Indian politician
- Sachin Baby (born 1988), Indian cricketer

== See also ==
- Baby (nickname) & given name
- Baby (disambiguation)
