= Babe (nickname) =

Babe is a nickname of:

- Babe Adams (1882–1968), American Major League Baseball pitcher
- Babe Barna (1917–1972), American Major League Baseball left fielder
- Woolf Barnato (1895–1948), British financier and racing driver
- Babe Borton (1888–1954), American Major League Baseball first baseman
- Baekuni (born 1961), known as “Babe”, an Indonesian serial killer who mutilated
- John H. Brown Jr. (1891–1963), American football player and United States Navy vice admiral
- Don Chandler (1934–2011), American National Football League punter and placekicker
- Babe Clark (1889–1974), American football player
- Babe Dahlgren (1912–1996), American Major League Baseball infielder who replaced Lou Gehrig
- Babe Didrikson Zaharias (1911–1956), American multi-sport female athlete
- Babe Dye (1898–1962), Canadian professional ice hockey forward
- Babe Egan (1897–1966), American jazz musician
- Bert Ellison (1895–1955), Major League Baseball player
- Babe Frump (1901–1979), American offensive guard in the National Football League
- Ira Hanford (1918–2009), American jockey
- Babe Herman (1903–1987), American Major League Baseball right fielder
- Edward Heffron (1923-2013), World War 2 paratrooper
- Jacquelyn Kelley (1926–1988), member of the All-American Girls Professional Baseball League
- Babe Laufenberg (born 1959), American retired National Football League quarterback
- Babe London (1901–1980), American actress and comedian
- Howard Lydecker (1911–1969), half of the Lydecker brothers, a movie special effects team
- Babe Martin (1920–2013), American Major League Baseball outfielder
- Babe McCarthy (1923–1975), American professional and collegiate basketball coach
- Babe Paley (1915–1978), American socialite and style icon
- Babe Parilli (1930–2017), American quarterback in the National, American, and Canadian Football Leagues
- Babe Parnell (1901–1982), American football player
- Babe Pinelli (1895–1984), American Major League Baseball third baseman and umpire
- Babe Pratt (1916–1988), Canadian ice hockey defenseman
- Babe Russin (1911–1984), American jazz saxophonist
- Babe Ruth (1895–1948), American Major League baseball player
- Babe Scheuer (1913–1997), American football player
- Babe Siebert (1904–1939), Canadian National Hockey League player
- Emmett "Babe" Wallace (1909–2006), American singer, composer and actor
- Babe Ziegenhorn (1918–1970), American basketball player

== See also ==
- Baby (nickname)
