= List of historic places in Essex County, Ontario =

This is a list of historic places in Essex County, Ontario, containing heritage sites listed on the Canadian Register of Historic Places (CRHP), all of which are designated as historic places either locally, provincially, territorially, nationally, or by more than one level of government.

== List of historic places ==
| Name | Address | Coordinates | Government recognition (CRHP №) | Wikidata ID | Image |
|---|---|---|---|---|---|
| Amherstburg First Baptist Church National Historic Site of Canada | 232 George Street; Amherstburg ON | 42°06′10″N 83°06′20″W | Federal (19445) | | |
| Amherstburg Navy Yard National Historic Site of Canada | Dalhousie Street; Amherstburg ON | 42°06′13″N 83°06′51″W | Federal (13965) | | More images |
| Belle Vue National Historic Site of Canada | 525 Dalhousie Street; Amherstburg ON | 42°05′31″N 83°06′45″W | Federal (1164) | | More images |
| Bois Blanc Island Lighthouse and Blockhouse National Historic Site of Canada | Amherstburg ON | 42°05′13″N 83°07′11″W | Federal (16144, (20662) | | More images |
| Brick Barrack | 100 Laird Avenue South; Amherstburg ON | 42°06′25″N 83°06′47″W | Federal (4364) | | |
| Christ Church Amherstburg (Anglican) | 317 Ramsay Street; Amherstburg ON | 42°06′00″N 83°06′39″W | Ontario (10177) | | |
| Commissariat Office / Callum House (Amherstburg Navy Yard) | Dalhousie Street, Navy Yard Park; Amherstburg ON | 42°06′12″N 83°06′49″W | Federal (4367) | | |
| Fort Malden National Historic Site of Canada | 100 Laird Avenue South; Amherstburg ON | 42°06′26″N 83°06′48″W | Federal (7615) | | |
| Hough House | 100 Laird Avenue South; Amherstburg ON | 42°06′26″N 83°06′48″W | Federal (4370) | | More images |
| Lighthouse | Bois Blanc Island; Amherstburg ON | 42°05′13″N 83°07′11″W | Federal (4479) | | |
| Nazrey African Methodist Episcopal Church National Historic Site of Canada | 271 King Street; Amherstburg ON | 42°06′04″N 83°06′21″W | Federal (6054) | | More images |
| Visitor Orientation Centre | 100 Laird Avenue South; Amherstburg ON | 42°06′25″N 83°06′47″W | Federal (4480) | | |
| Canadian National Railways Station | Maple Street; Comber ON | 42°14′11″N 82°33′03″W | Federal (4615) | | More images |
| Canadian National Railway Station | Marlborough Street West and M C R Drive; Leamington ON | 42°03′02″N 82°36′26″W | Federal (7885) | | More images |
| Delaurier House | Point Pelee; Leamington ON | 41°56′49″N 82°30′50″W | Federal (4764) | | Upload Photo |
| Southeast Shoal Dwelling | Point Pelee; Leamington ON | 41°57′24″N 82°25′21″W | Federal (4751) | | Upload Photo |
| 534 Kildare Road | 534 Kildare Road; Windsor ON | 42°19′24″N 83°00′48″W | Windsor municipality (8477) | | More images |
| 536 Kildare Road | 536 Kildare Road; Windsor ON | 42°19′24″N 83°00′47″W | Windsor municipality (8478) | | More images |
| 546-548 Devonshire Road | 546-548 Devonshire Road; Windsor ON | 42°19′25″N 83°00′43″W | Windsor municipality (5616) | | More images |
| 650 Devonshire Road | 650 Devonshire Road; Windsor ON | 42°19′22″N 83°00′41″W | Windsor municipality (8326) | | More images |
| 656 Devonshire Road | 656 Devonshire Road; Windsor ON | 42°19′21″N 83°00′41″W | Windsor municipality (8327) | | |
| 704 Monmouth Road | 704 Monmouth Road; Windsor ON | 42°19′22″N 83°00′32″W | Windsor municipality (8328) | | More images |
| 716 Monmouth Road | 716 Monmouth Road; Windsor ON | 42°19′22″N 83°00′31″W | Windsor municipality (8376) | | |
| 721 Walker Road | 721 Walker Road; Windsor ON | 42°19′23″N 83°00′30″W | Windsor municipality (8377) | | More images |
| 731 Walker Road | 731 Walker Road; Windsor ON | 42°19′22″N 83°00′29″W | Windsor municipality (15159) | | More images |
| 739 Walker Road | 739 Walker Road; Windsor ON | 42°19′22″N 83°00′29″W | Windsor municipality (8378) | | More images |
| 744 Monmouth Road | 744 Monmouth Road; Windsor ON | 42°19′21″N 83°00′31″W | Windsor municipality (8379) | | More images |
| 749 Walker Road | 749 Walker Road; Windsor ON | 42°19′22″N 83°00′29″W | Windsor municipality (16328) | | More images |
| 753 Walker Road | 753 Walker Road; Windsor ON | 42°19′22″N 83°00′29″W | Windsor municipality (15160) | | More images |
| 756 Monmouth Road | 756 Monmouth Road; Windsor ON | 42°19′21″N 83°00′31″W | Windsor municipality (15216) | | |
| 763 Walker Road | 763 Walker Road; Windsor ON | 42°19′21″N 83°00′29″W | Windsor municipality (15214) | | More images |
| Abner F. Nash House | 694 Victoria Avenue; Windsor ON | 42°18′45″N 83°02′16″W | Windsor municipality (8382) | | More images |
| Addyman-Ould House | 904 Lawrence Road; Windsor ON | 42°19′27″N 82°58′39″W | Windsor municipality (8829) | | Upload Photo |
| Arthur and Marie Langlois House | 351 Mill Street; Windsor ON | 42°18′05″N 83°04′29″W | Windsor municipality (8546) | | More images |
| Assumption Church | 350 Huron Church Road; Windsor ON | 42°18′26″N 83°04′11″W | Windsor municipality (7682) | | More images |
| Assumption Church (Roman Catholic) | 350 Huron Church Road; Windsor ON | 42°18′27″N 83°04′11″W | Ontario (9942) | | More images |
| Assumption Park | 1902 Riverside Drive; Windsor ON | 42°18′37″N 83°04′16″W | Windsor municipality (8547) | | |
| Baby-Lajeunesse House | 3402 Sandwich Street; Windsor ON | 42°17′51″N 83°04′43″W | Windsor municipality (8548) | | More images |
| Bank of Montreal Building | 1799 Wyandotte Street East; Windsor ON | 42°19′19″N 83°00′51″W | Windsor municipality (7605) | | More images |
| Bedford United Church | 3340 Sandwich Street; Windsor ON | 42°17′56″N 83°04′41″W | Windsor municipality (10783) | | More images |
| Charles R. Cole House | 595 Cataraqui Street; Windsor ON | 42°18′54″N 83°01′39″W | Windsor municipality (7578) | | More images |
| The Cobbles-Victor Williamson House | 849 Kildare Road; Windsor ON | 42°19′12″N 83°00′42″W | Windsor municipality (8555) | | More images |
| Crown Inn | 378-396 Devonshire Road; Windsor ON | 42°19′29″N 83°00′47″W | Windsor municipality (7608) | | More images |
| DeGurse-McEwen House | 537 Kildare Road; Windsor ON | 42°19′22″N 83°00′49″W | Windsor municipality (8359) | | More images |
| Devonshire Road Bank Building | 606-610 Devonshire Road; Windsor ON | 42°19′23″N 83°00′42″W | Windsor municipality (5617) | | More images |
| Dr. Charles W. Hoare House | 2088 Willistead Crescent; Windsor ON | 42°19′04″N 83°00′29″W | Windsor municipality (15211) | | More images |
| Dr. Freeman Brockenshire House | 1142 Kildare Road; Windsor ON | 42°18′54″N 83°00′29″W | Windsor municipality (14624) | | More images |
| Dr. Henry Crassweller House | 2014 Willstead Crescent; Windsor ON | 42°19′09″N 83°00′32″W | Windsor municipality (8662) | | More images |
| Dr. Neil MacDonald House | 2228 Victoria Avenue; Windsor ON | 42°17′38″N 83°01′33″W | Windsor municipality (8391) | | |
| Dr. Roy J. Coyle House | 2077 Willistead Crescent; Windsor ON | 42°19′07″N 83°00′28″W | Windsor municipality (8392) | | More images |
| Dominion House Tavern | 3140 Sandwich Street; Windsor ON | 42°18′13″N 83°04′31″W | Windsor municipality (8666) | | More images |
| Duff-Baby House | 221 Mill Street; Windsor ON | 42°18′08″N 83°04′38″W | Ontario (8844), Windsor municipality (8393) | | More images |
| Easton House | 2011 Willistead Crescent; Windsor ON | 42°19′08″N 83°00′33″W | Windsor municipality (15206) | | More images |
| Elmscroft Carriage House | 823 Argyle Road; Windsor ON | 42°19′16″N 83°00′36″W | Windsor municipality (8409) | | More images |
| Ernest G. Henderson House | 803 Victoria Avenue; Windsor ON | 42°18′40″N 83°02′14″W | Windsor municipality (9053) | | More images |
| Esdras Parent House | 827 Esdras Place; Windsor ON | 42°19′42″N 82°58′00″W | Windsor municipality (7589) | | Upload Photo |
| Federal Building | 185 Ouellette Avenue; Windsor ON | 42°19′07″N 83°02′23″W | Federal (11230) | | |
| Former John Richardson Library | 1495 Wyandotte Street West; Windsor ON | 42°18′24″N 83°03′12″W | Windsor municipality (8497) | | Upload Photo |
| Former Sandwich Fire Hall and Stable | 363 Mill Street; Windsor ON | 42°18′05″N 83°04′29″W | Windsor municipality (8498) | | More images |
| Former Walkerville Post Office | 420 Devonshire Road; Windsor ON | 42°19′28″N 83°00′44″W | Windsor municipality (3374) | | More images |
| Former Walkerville Town Hall | 350 Devonshire Road; Windsor ON | 42°19′30″N 83°00′48″W | Windsor municipality (7683) | | More images |
| Former Windsor - Essex County Family YMCA | 511 Pelissier Street; Windsor ON | 42°18′53″N 83°02′19″W | Windsor municipality (2250) | | Upload Photo |
| François Bâby House National Historic Site of Canada | 254 Pitt Street West; Windsor ON | 42°19′07″N 83°02′30″W | Federal (12401), Windsor municipality (9557) | | More images |
| Frank H. Joyce House | 3975 Riverside; Windsor ON | 42°19′35″N 82°59′21″W | Windsor municipality (14444) | | More images |
| Frederick Allworth House | 825 Victoria Avenue; Windsor ON | 42°18′38″N 83°02′15″W | Windsor municipality (8499) | | More images |
| Gauthier House | 3281 Peter Street; Windsor ON | 42°17′59″N 83°04′30″W | Windsor municipality (17221) | | Upload Photo |
| George M. Duck House | 709 Devonshire Road; Windsor ON | 42°19′18″N 83°00′42″W | Windsor municipality (15204) | | More images |
| Harry E. Guppy House | 1089 Victoria Avenue; Windsor ON | 42°18′24″N 83°02′05″W | Windsor municipality (15203) | | More images |
| Hiram Walker and Sons Limited Main Office Building | 2072 Riverside Drive East; Windsor ON | 42°19′33″N 83°00′45″W | Windsor municipality (7684) | | More images |
| Holy Redeemer College | 925 Cousineau Road; Windsor ON | 42°14′32″N 83°00′21″W | Windsor municipality (11643) | | More images |
| Imperial Building | 1900-1942 Wyandotte Street East; Windsor ON | 42°19′23″N 83°00′47″W | Windsor municipality (5609) | | Upload Photo |
| Janisse-Schade House | 5325 Riverside Drive East; Windsor ON | 42°19′50″N 82°58′27″W | Windsor municipality (8519) | | Upload Photo |
| John Campbell School | 1255 Tecumseh; Windsor ON | 42°18′00″N 83°00′23″W | Windsor municipality (14405) | | Upload Photo |
| Kathleen Henderson House | 1148 Victoria Avenue; Windsor ON | 42°18′21″N 83°02′00″W | Windsor municipality (9043) | | Upload Photo |
| LaBelle Terrace | Corner of Chatham and Dougall; Windsor ON | 42°19′02″N 83°02′34″W | Windsor municipality (5619) | | Upload Photo |
| Mackenzie Hall (Former Essex County Court House) | 3277 Sandwich Street; Windsor ON | 42°18′01″N 83°04′35″W | Windsor municipality (8520) | | More images |
| Mason-Girardot House | 3203 Peter Street; Windsor ON | 42°18′05″N 83°04′26″W | Windsor municipality (7708) | | More images |
| Masonic Hall | 986 Ouellette Avenue; Windsor ON | 42°18′33″N 83°02′01″W | Windsor municipality (8521) | | |
| Masson-Deck House | 3069 Alexander Avenue; Windsor ON | 42°18′00″N 83°04′22″W | Windsor municipality (7579) | | Upload Photo |
| McGregor-Cowan House | 3118 Sandwich Street; Windsor ON | 42°18′14″N 83°04′30″W | Windsor municipality (2240) | | More images |
| Medical Arts Building | 1011 Ouellette Avenue; Windsor ON | 42°18′31″N 83°02′02″W | Windsor municipality (7984) | | |
| Mt. Zion Church of God in Christ | 795 McDougall Street; Windsor ON | 42°18′48″N 83°01′53″W | Windsor municipality (8522) | | |
| Patrice Parent House | 4371 Riverside Drive East; Windsor ON | 42°19′38″N 82°59′04″W | Windsor municipality (8523) | | Upload Photo |
| Perry-Breault House | 245 Mill Street; Windsor ON | 42°18′07″N 83°04′36″W | Windsor municipality (8524) | | |
| Porter-Coate House | 794 Devonshire Road; Windsor ON | 42°19′17″N 83°00′38″W | Windsor municipality (5620) | | More images |
| Revell-D'Avignon House | 567 Church Street; Windsor ON | 42°18′47″N 83°02′29″W | Windsor municipality (7986) | | Upload Photo |
| Robert Gordon House | 204 Curry Avenue; Windsor ON | 42°18′50″N 83°03′26″W | Windsor municipality (3337) | | Upload Photo |
| Robinet Winery Building | 3200 Sandwich Street; Windsor ON | 42°18′07″N 83°04′34″W | Windsor municipality (7988) | | More images |
| Robinson-Beaudet House | 908 Dawson Road; Windsor ON | 42°19′29″N 82°58′36″W | Windsor municipality (7769) | | Upload Photo |
| Roseland Golf Course | 455 Kennedy Drive West; Windsor ON | 42°15′01″N 83°00′22″W | Windsor municipality (5603) | | Upload Photo |
| St. John's Anglican Church and Cemetery | 3305 Sandwich Street; Windsor ON | 42°17′57″N 83°04′36″W | Windsor municipality (8529) | | More images |
| St. Peter's Maronite Church | 166 Tecumseh Road West; Windsor ON | 42°17′48″N 83°01′37″W | Windsor municipality (8550) | | |
| St. Rose of Lima Church | 891 St. Rose; Windsor ON | 42°19′47″N 82°57′12″W | Windsor municipality (14581) | | Upload Photo |
| Sandwich First Baptist Church National Historic Site of Canada | 3652 Peter Street; Windsor ON | 42°17′30″N 83°04′48″W | Federal (13374), Windsor municipality (8526) | | More images |
| Sandwich Post Office | 3201 Sandwich Street; Windsor ON | 42°18′06″N 83°04′31″W | Windsor municipality (8527) | | More images |
| Stephen A. Griggs House | 889 Kildare Road; Windsor ON | 42°19′10″N 83°00′40″W | Windsor municipality (8551) | | More images |
| Taylor-Growe House | 742 Victoria Avenue; Windsor ON | 42°18′42″N 83°02′14″W | Windsor municipality (8553) | | More images |
| Treble-Large House | 719 Victoria Avenue; Windsor ON | 42°18′43″N 83°02′18″W | Windsor municipality (9234) | | More images |
| Wallmay Carriage House | 819 Argyle Road; Windsor ON | 42°19′16″N 83°00′36″W | Windsor municipality (9551) | | More images |
| Wigle House | 3164 Sandwich Street; Windsor ON | 42°18′11″N 83°04′32″W | Windsor municipality (8558) | | More images |
| William Donald McGregor House | 916 Victoria Avenue; Windsor ON | 42°18′35″N 83°02′10″W | Windsor municipality (8562) | | More images |
| William T. Wesgate House | 225 Giles Boulevard West; Windsor ON | 42°18′16″N 83°02′00″W | Windsor municipality (3025) | | More images |
| Willistead Manor | 1899 Niagara Street; Windsor ON | 42°19′03″N 83°00′36″W | Windsor municipality (2274) | | More images |
| Windsor Armouries | 353 Freedom Way; Windsor ON | 42°19′02″N 83°02′15″W | Windsor municipality (7707) | | More images |

== See also ==
- List of historic places in Southwestern Ontario
- List of historic places in Ontario
- List of National Historic Sites of Canada in Ontario
