= Windsor International Transit Terminal =

Bus station in Windsor, Ontario, Canada

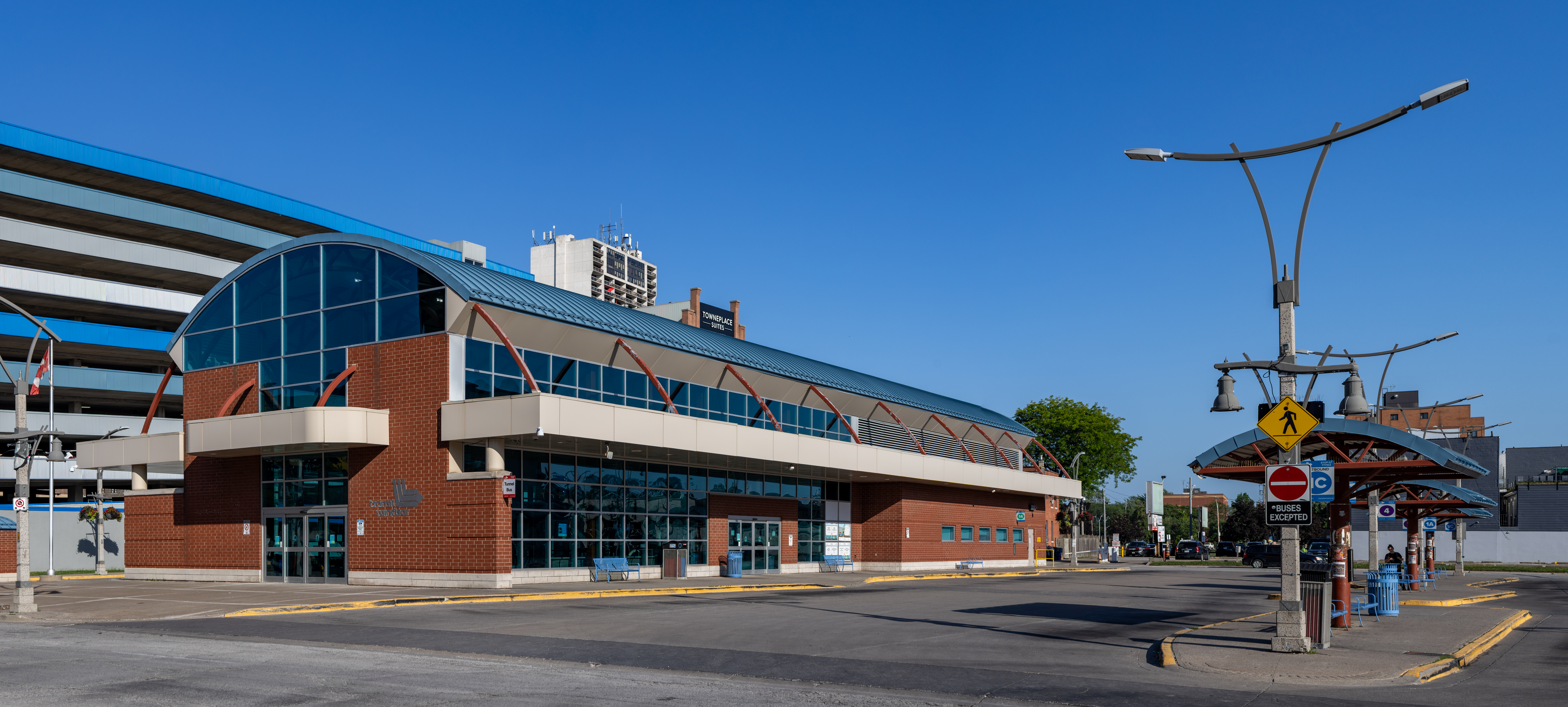

General information
- Location: 300 Chatham Street West; Windsor, Ontario; Canada
- Coordinates: 42°19′03.5″N 83°02′35″W
- Owner: City of Windsor
- Bus stands: 16
- Bus operators: Transit Windsor; FlixBus

Construction
- Cycle facilities: Bicycle posts
- Accessible: Yes

History
- Opened: 2007
Location

Windsor International Transit Terminal (WITT) is a bus terminal for Transit Windsor. It is located on the block between Chatham Street and Pitt Street on the east side of Church Street in downtown Windsor, Ontario, Canada.

Transit Windsor redeveloped its downtown transit terminal through a public-private partnership involving federal, provincial and local governments and Greyhound Canada. The new bus station, built at a cost of $7.4-million, opened in the summer of 2007, replacing a small facility that was more than 65 years old. The project is sited next to several major arts facilities, like the Art Gallery of Windsor, Windsor's Community Museum, and François Baby House, and is about 0.6 kilometres from Caesars Windsor.

== Services ==
=== Transit Windsor ===
- 1A Transway
- 1C Transway (eastbound and westbound)
- 4 Ottawa
- 5 Dominion
- 6 Dougall
- 8 Walkerville
- 14 Parent

=== Intercity ===
- FlixBus: Detroit - Toronto
