= Jacques Babie =

Jacques Babie (c. 1633 – 28 July 1688) was the patriarch of a French Canadian family (later spelled Bâby) that were successful fur traders for generations in Lower and Upper Canada. Their success earned them political roles in Canada even after Great Britain took over control of the territory.

== Biography ==
=== Military ===
Babie moved to Canada from France in 1665 as part of a French regiment to fight the Iroquois nations, which were based in present-day New York and Pennsylvania south of the Great Lakes. After a peace agreement was reached in 1666 by Alexandre de Prouville Marquis de Tracy, Babie obtained his discharge from the army.

=== Trading ===
He settled near Trois-Rivières to farm and compete in the fur trade. By 1668 he was actively engaged in the fur trade, working with First Nations along the upper Saint-Maurice and Ottawa rivers. He was also eligible to participate in the annual fur market in Montreal. He also continued to acquire land.

=== Personal life ===
Babie married and had 11 children. At the time of his death in Champlain, Quebec, he left behind a comfortable inheritance. His youngest son, Raymond Babie, was the father of Jacques Baby, dit Dupéron, and François Baby, both of whom were notable in their generation.
