= Baekuni =

Indonesian serial killer

- Born: 1961 (age 64–65); Indonesia
- Other name: Babe
- Convictions: Murder, rape, dismemberment
- Penalty: Death

Details
- Victims: 14
- Span of crimes: 1993–2010
- Country: Indonesia
- Date apprehended: January 9, 2010

Baekuni (born 1961), also known as Babe, is an Indonesian serial killer who mutilated and molested 14 young boys.

== Life ==
The son of a poor farmer in Magelang, Central Java, Baekuni was mocked as a "fool" because he often did not go to class. Unable to bear the insults, he left school permanently and fled to Jakarta. He lived in Banteng Square, until one day he was forcefully sodomized by a thug. This experience influenced his proclivities toward pedophilia and situational necrophilia.

== Murders ==
In 1993, Baekuni began raping street children between the ages of 4 and 14. He was arrested at his residence at the Gang Haji Dalim Mosque in East Jakarta on January 9, 2010, after a complaint from one of the victims' parents, a 9-year-old victim named Ardiansyah, who disappeared. His mutilated body was found on January 8, 2010, and his head was found a day later.

== Trial ==
Baekuni was sentenced to life imprisonment on October 6, 2010, by an East Jakarta District Court judge. He appealed to the Jakarta High Court, who then sentenced him to death. His lawyers then appealed the High Court's decision. The Supreme Court rejected Baekuni's appeal and maintained that he was guilty of killing 14 boys and mutilating four of them.

== See also ==
- List of serial killers by country
- List of serial killers by number of victims
- Very Idham Henyansyah
- Ahmad Suradji
