= Jean Baptiste Baby =

Upper Canada politician

Jean Baptiste Baby (January 5, 1770 – October 3, 1852) was a businessman, farmer and political figure in Upper Canada.

He was born at Detroit in 1768, the son of Jacques Baby, dit Dupéront and the brother of François and James, who were also prominent figures in Upper Canada. He served as lieutenant-colonel in the local militia during the War of 1812 and took part in the capture of Detroit. He was named justice of the peace in the Western District in 1816 and treasurer in 1837. He represented Essex in the 5th Parliament of Upper Canada.
