= Idham =

Idham is an Indonesian and Malaysian name. Notable people with the name include:

Given name

- Idham Azis (born 1963), Indonesian police general
- Idham Chalid (1921–2010), Indonesian politician and minister

Middle name

- Very Idham Henyansyah (born 1978), Indonesian convicted serial killer, also known as Ryan
- Khairul Idham Pawi (born 1998), Malaysian motorcycle racer

Surname

- Ahmad Idham (born 1974), Malaysian actor, director, and producer
