= Detroit United Railway =

American transport company

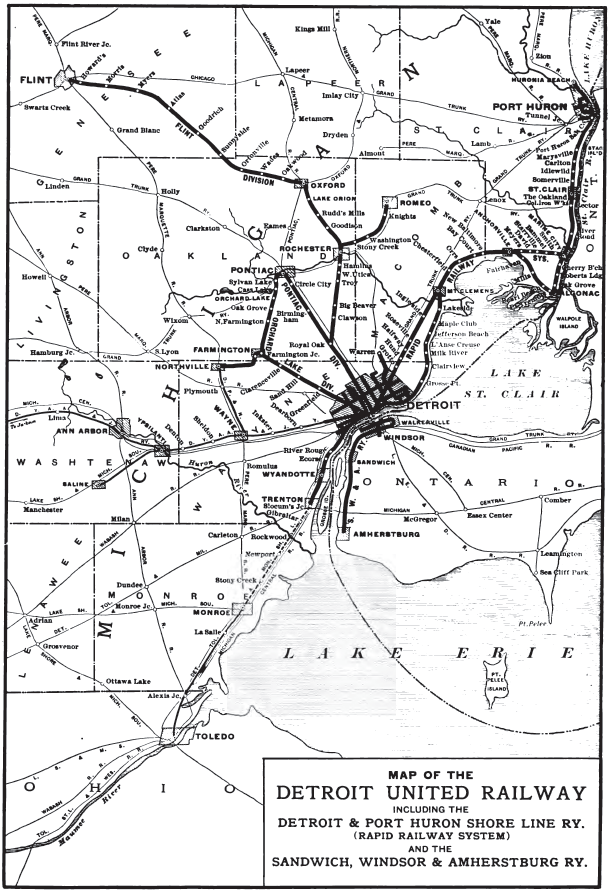
A map of the DUR network from 1904.

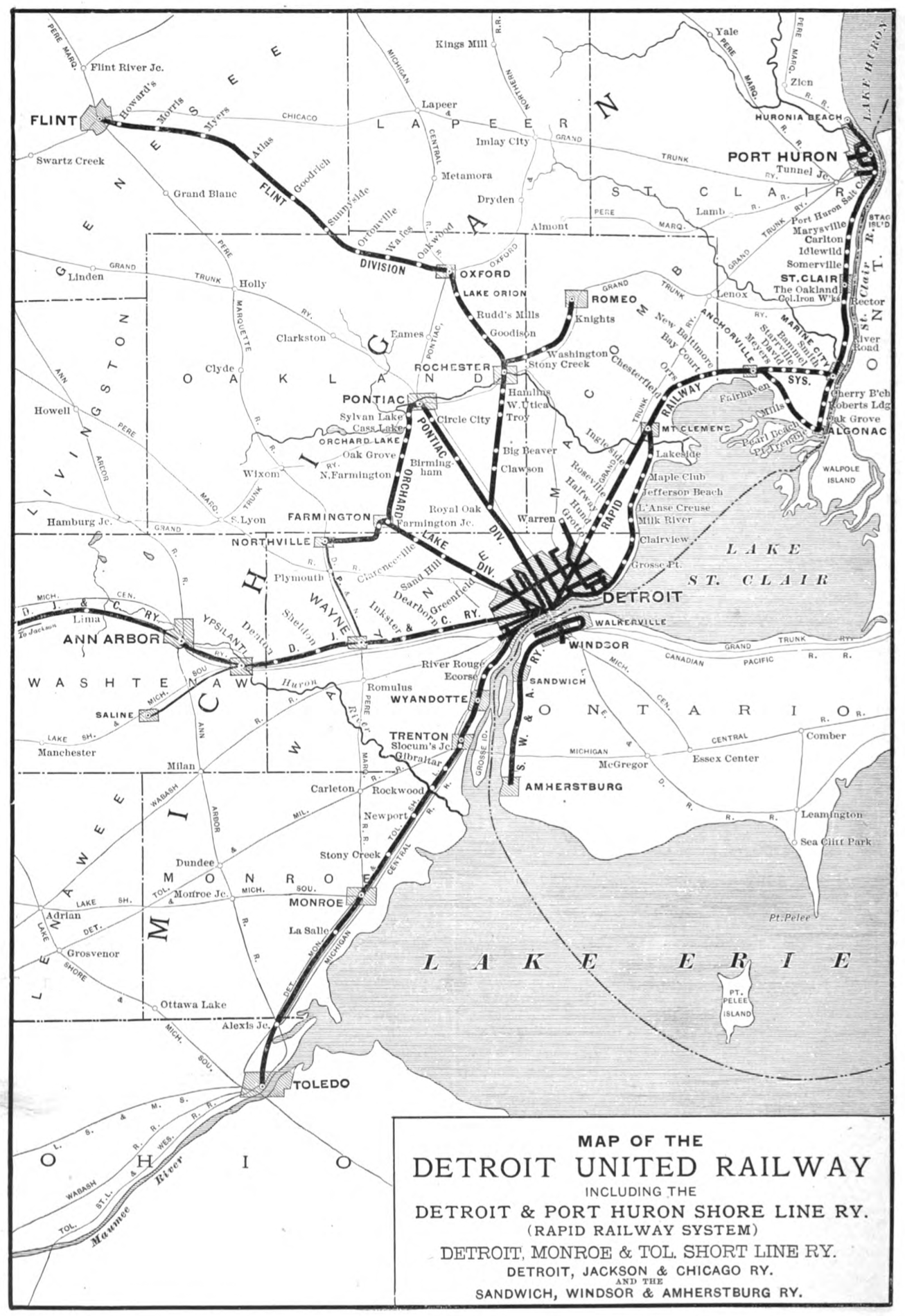
Map of Detroit United Railway c 1907

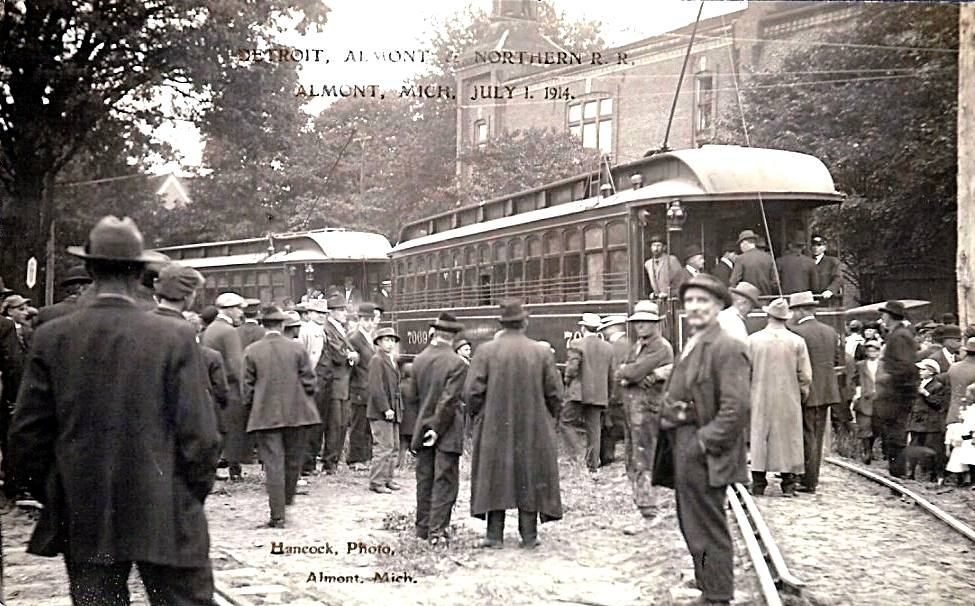
First interurban cars on the Detroit, Almont and Northern Railroad, Almont, Michigan, July 1, 1914.

The Detroit United Railway was a transport company which operated numerous streetcar and interurban lines in southeast Michigan. Although many of the lines were originally built by different companies, they were consolidated under the control of the Everett-Moore syndicate, a Cleveland-based group of investors. The company incorporated on December 31, 1900, and continued to expand into the early 1920s through new construction and the acquisition of smaller concerns. After the DUR acquired the Detroit-Jackson line in 1907, it operated more than 400 miles (640 km) of interurban lines and 187 miles (301 km) of street city street railway lines.

Beginning in 1922, however, the DUR began a process of devolution when it sold the local Detroit, Michigan streetcar system to the city, under the management of the Department of Street Railways (DSR). The company continued to abandon or sell properties throughout the 1920s; on September 26, 1928, the remainder was reorganized as the Eastern Michigan Railways (EMR).

The Eastern Michigan operated an interurban line from Detroit to Toledo where it connected with Ohio interurbans. With the Cincinnati and Lake Erie interurban connection at Toledo, passenger and freight service was provided from Detroit to Dayton and Cincinnati. This line was abandoned in 1932 due to lack of business.

In addition to their Michigan holdings, the Detroit United Railway also owned the Sandwich, Windsor and Amherstburg Railway, an interurban trolley line linking Windsor, Ontario with the towns of Tecumseh, Ontario to its east, and to La Salle, Ontario and Amherstburg, Ontario to its southwest. This was purchased in 1901, and sold in 1920. Remnants of the DUR in the Windsor area to this day include the Ganatchio Trail bike path (along former Claireview Street, the original SW&A alignment), and the older bridge foundations on Front Road over River Canard.

== Publications ==
- Electric railway service / Publicity Dept., Detroit United Lines. Detroit, Mich.: 1913–1920, 5 vols. A weekly periodical, now available through googlebooks.com.
- [Safety bulletin] / Pere Marquette Railway Co. Detroit Mich.: 1918–1920.
- Safety: a magazine for all of us / Detroit United Lines. Detroit, Mich.: 1914?- ? For their street car conductors.
