= François Baby (politician) =

Canadian politician (1768–1852)

- Born: December 16, 1768; Detroit, Indian Reserve, British America
- Died: August 27, 1852 (aged 83); Sandwich, Province of Canada, British North America
- Occupation: Politician

François Baby (December 16, 1768 – August 27, 1852) was a French-Canadian businessman, soldier, and politician in Upper Canada. He was based in Detroit when it was still under the control of Great Britain and before it was ceded to the newly independent United States. After the British evacuated Fort Detroit in 1796, he moved with his family across the Detroit River and established residence in Sandwich (now Windsor, Ontario).

== Biography ==
Baby was born in Detroit in 1768, the son of Jacques Baby and his wife. He was named for his father's brother François Baby, a prominent merchant. Baby was born five years after France ceded this territory to Great Britain after the Seven Years' War. A French Canadian Roman Catholic, Baby belonged to one of the richest and most powerful families in the Western District of Upper Canada at that time. He served in the Detroit Militia in the 1780s and 1790s and, as an ensign, signed the McKee Treaty in 1790. In 1792, he was elected to represent Kent County (now Ontario) in the first Legislative Assembly of Upper Canada.

After the British evacuated Fort Detroit in 1796, Baby eventually moved across the Detroit River to Sandwich in Upper Canada. During the War of 1812, he joined British forces. He was captured by the Americans in 1814. During the war, Baby's newly constructed house at Sandwich (Windsor) was taken over by invading American troops. After he returned, he discovered that his home had been plundered and damaged. He never felt that he was adequately compensated by the US.

In 1820, Baby was elected to the legislative assembly representing Essex. Although connected with the elite, he supported moderate reformers. Baby was an early proponent of bilingualism, requesting that the acts of the legislature be translated into French. He opposed the union of Upper and Lower Canada.

During the 1840s, Baby operated a ferry service across the Detroit River between Windsor and Detroit.

He died in Windsor in 1852 and was buried in the churchyard of Assumption Church (possibly relocated to Assumption Cemetery's current location.

== Legacy ==
- Known Hereditary Slave owner having inherited African and Indigenous Slaves from his father, Jacques Baby.
- Brother of James Baby who openly opposed Lieutenant Governor John Graves Simcoe's effort to precipitately outright abolish slavery in Upper Canada
- The François Baby House is operated as Windsor's Community Museum.

== Timeline ==
- 1768 - December 16. Born in the British town of Detroit, a son of Jacques Du Perron Baby and Suzanne Reaume.
- 1786 - Completed his education at Quebec.
- 1792–1796 - Still a resident of Detroit, represented Kent County, Upper Canada, in the Legislative Assembly following the province's first election. Detroit was British-occupied American territory at the time.
- 1794 - July. Appointed captain of a company of French-Canadian militia.
- 1795 - September 5. Married Frances Abbott of Detroit, in Assumption Church on the Canadian side of the river.
- 1807 - October. Appointed Lieutenant of the County of Essex.
- 1812–1813 - Appointed assistant quartermaster general of militia for the Western District. Served throughout the Detroit River campaign and was recommended by Sir Gordon Drummond for decoration for valuable services.
- 1813 - December 30. Participated in a British attack on Black Rock, Niagara Frontier.
- 1814 - January 31. Captured by Americans at Delaware, Upper Canada.
- 1820–1830 - Member for Essex County in the Upper Canada Legislative Assembly.
- c. 1832 - Subdivided the frontage of his farm. This was the first urban development in what was to become Windsor.
- 1842 - Had ferryboat Alliance built.
- 1849 - Gave land for present-day Ferry Street to the public, replacing an earlier lane that had served as access to a ferry landing.
- 1852 - Died age 84. Buried in Assumption Churchyard.
