= Baby (nickname) =

Baby is the nickname of:

- Baby Arizmendi (1914–1962), Mexican featherweight world boxing champion
- Baby Consuelo (born 1952), Brazilian singer, guitarist and composer
- Baby Dalupan (1923–2016), former Philippine Basketball Association coach and player
- Baby Dodds (1898–1959), American jazz drummer
- Baby John (1917–2008), Indian socialist politician
- Baby Pozzi (born 1963), Italian pornographic film actress
- Baby Ray (1914–1986), American National Football League player
- Baby Tate (guitarist) (1916–1972), American Piedmont blues guitarist
- Baby Tate (rapper) (born 1996), American rapper, singer, songwriter and record producer
- Baby Washington (born 1940), American soul and R&B singer
- Dave "Baby" Cortez (born 1938), American pop and R&B organist and pianist
- Jacob "Baby Jake" Matlala (1962–2013), South African boxer and junior flyweight champion
- Princess Beatrice of the United Kingdom (1857–1944), youngest daughter of Queen Victoria
- Rafael Araújo (basketball) (born 1980), Brazilian professional basketball player

== See also ==
- Baby Halder (born 1973), Indian writer
- Baby Huwae (1939–1989), Indonesian actress and singer
- Baby (surname)
- Baby (disambiguation)
- Babe (nickname)
