= Transit Windsor =

Public transit operator in Windsor, Ontario, Canada

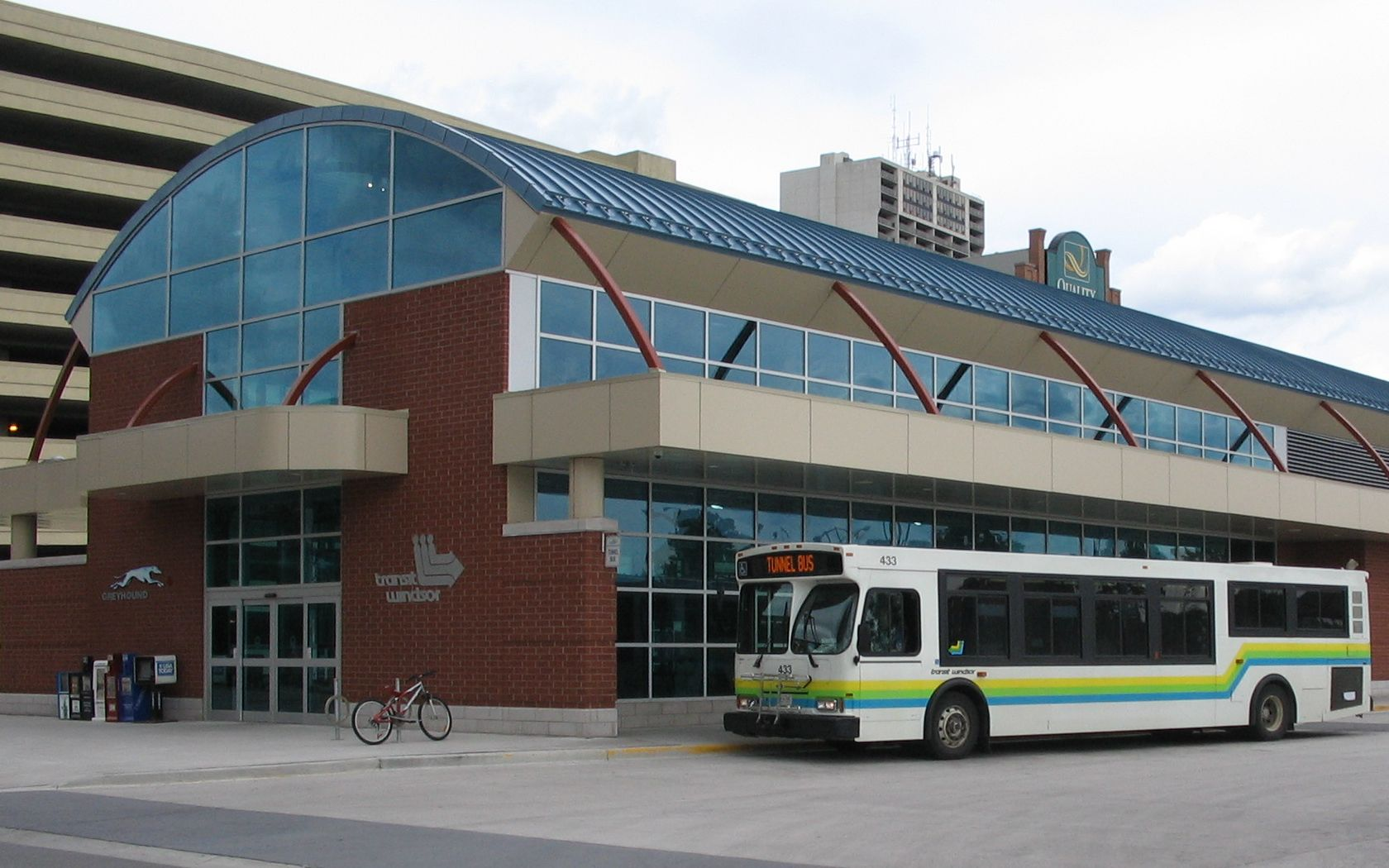
- Windsor International Transit Terminal
- Founded: 1977 (Predecessor SW&A was founded in 1872)
- Headquarters: 3700 North Service Road East; Windsor, Ontario, Canada
- Locale: Windsor, Ontario
- Service area: Windsor, Ontario; Parts of Essex County (LaSalle, Essex, Kingsville, Leamington, Amherstburg)
- Service type: Public transit
- Routes: 18
- Stops: Approximately 1200
- Stations: Windsor International Transit Terminal
- Fleet: 117 buses
- Daily ridership: 22,410 (2018)
- Fuel type: Diesel, Hybrid-Diesel-Electric
- Operator: City of Windsor
- Executive Director: Stephan Habrun (Acting)
- Website: Official website

Transit Windsor provides public transportation in the city of Windsor, Ontario, Canada as well as LaSalle, Essex, Kingsville, Amherstburg and Leamington and serves more than 6 million passengers each year (6.72 million in 2017), covering an area of 310 km^{2} (120 sq mi) and a population of 235,000. The Windsor International Transit Terminal neighbours with the Windsor International Aquatic and Training Centre.

The predecessor of Transit Windsor was the Sandwich, Windsor and Amherstburg Railway (SW&A) which operated streetcars and interurbans until 1939, when it fully converted to bus operation. The company was renamed to Transit Windsor in 1977.

Until 2025, the agency also operated an international route serving Detroit in the United States via the Detroit–Windsor Tunnel.

== History ==
Transit Windsor was started on November 1, 1977 with 90 transit buses, one double-decker bus from England, three highway coaches, and two suburban buses. Before 1977, the company was called the Sandwich, Windsor & Amherstburg Railway Company or the "SW&A".

=== 1872 to 1939 ===
The earliest ancestor of the SW&A (and thus, Transit Windsor) is the Sandwich and Windsor Passenger Railway Company, which was officially incorporated on March 2, 1872 and operated from July 20, 1874 onwards. On March 3, 1880, it was operated under foreclosure by Mr. A. J. Kennedy, who re-incorporated it as the SW&A on June 25, 1887. During this period, the SW&A was using horse-drawn streetcars. In Autumn of 1877 to May 1878, the SW&A experimented with using steam dummy railway propulsion for its streetcar and interurban services, before switching to electric power on a full-time basis, from August 15, 1891, until May 6, 1939.

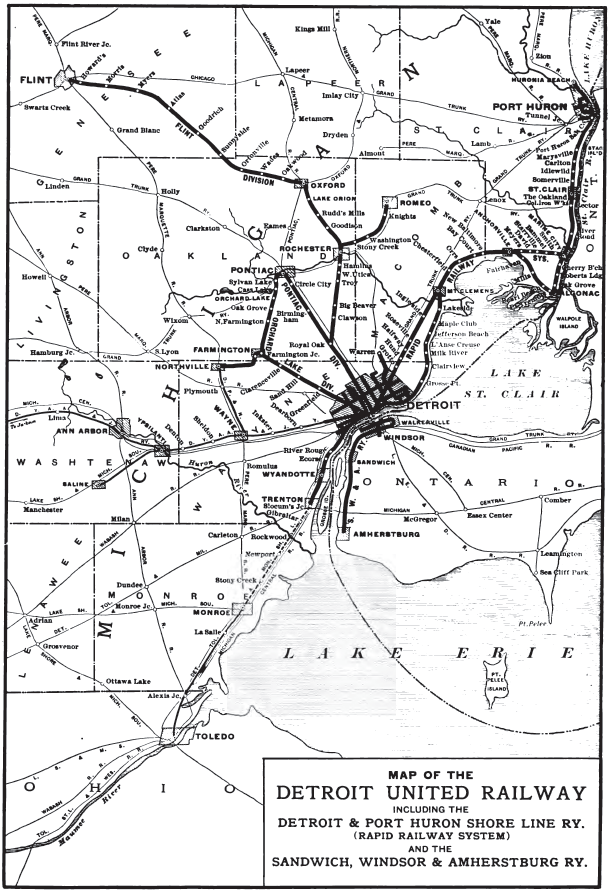
A map showing the Detroit United Railway's network in 1904. Interurban routes link street railroads in Detroit, Port Huron, and Windsor.

From August 31, 1901 to March 31, 1920, the SW&A was under ownership of the Detroit United Railway, when the local municipalities (the cities of Windsor and East Windsor, the towns of La Salle, Riverside, Tecumseh, Amherstburg, Ojibway, Sandwich, and Walkerville, and the townships Sandwich East and Sandwich West) purchased it back from them to retain it as a municipal operation. A result of this sale was the SW&A switching to electric streetcars, though the company began phasing out streetcars (electric and steam) during the 1930s and began using motorbuses. While under municipal ownership, it was operated by the Hydro Electric Power Commission of Ontario from April 1, 1920 until September 22, 1934 under their "Hydro-Electric Railways: Essex District" division.

At its apex, the SW&A rail operations had a grid of streetcar lines within Windsor along east-west streets: University Avenue, Wyandotte Street, College Avenue, Erie Street, Seminole Street, Tecumseh Road, and north-south streets: Ouellette Avenue, Parent Avenue, Lincoln Road. Interurban streetcars ran from Windsor to Tecumseh, Amherstburg, Essex, Kingsville and Leamington.

Electric trolleybuses were introduced on May 4, 1922, but were withdrawn on January 10, 1926, with the arrival of their replacements, the motorbuses. During the Great Depression, the SW&A withdrew its buses from regular service to save on operations costs, becoming purely trolley and interurban in service from 1931 until March 21, 1938, when buses returned and the interurban and trolley lines started being decommissioned.

On that date (March 21, 1938), the trolley lines to Amherstburg were the first to be replaced with buses, with the "Windsor-Walkerville" along Wyandotte Street and "Erie Streetcar" along Ottawa Street being the last to convert to buses, on May 6, 1939. The Windsor-Tecumseh Interurban would be the last rail service of any type, being replaced with buses on May 15, 1938.

==== Windsor Electric Street Railway Company ====
The Windsor Electric Street Railway was the first public electric street railway in Canada, having begun service on June 6, 1886 with official opening ceremonies on June 9. Electricity was replaced with steam dummy operations in April 1888 until the fall of that year, when it was replaced with horse-drawn carriages afterwards. It was reorganized on April 18, 1893 as the City Railway Company of Windsor, and was leased to the SW&A on March 21, 1894. The SW&A would completely absorb it on June 4, 1904 turning the Windsor-Essex Street Railway into its trolley line to Walkerville, Ontario.

==== Sandwich, Windsor and Amherstburg Interurban ====
March 31, 1902 saw the purchase of the South Essex Electric Railway (incorporated on April 7, 1896) by the SW&A, which held a charter to construct an interurban line to Amherstburg. This purchase would allow the SW&A to construct the yet-unbuilt line to Amherstburg from Windsor. The line was completed by the SW&A on July 4, 1903 and operated until May 15, 1938, when it was the first of the lines to be replaced with buses. Bus service to Amherstburg was sold to an independent operator, Sun Parlour Coach Lines in 1958, and would be absorbed into Charterways in 1960.

==== Windsor and Tecumseh Electric Railway Company ====
The Windsor and Tecumseh Electric Railway Company was incorporated in 1904 and acquired the charter and assets of the Ontario Traction Company, Limited's yet-unbuilt interurban line to Tecumseh from Windsor, on May 25, 1905. The line began interurban trolley service from May 1, 1907, and was purchased by the SW&A on March 31, 1920. It, and the "Erie Streetcar" along Ottawa Street in Windsor, were the two last trolleys/interurbans to be discontinued, surviving until May 15, 1938. Bus service would continue to Tecumseh until 1956.

The original interurban trolley line ran along Wyandotte Street, then Clairmont Street (later Clairview Street, today's Clairview Trail) and Ganatchio Trail before turning south along the west side of Lesperance Road in Tecumseh, terminating at a loop next to the CN Rail/VIA Rail tracks.

==== Windsor, Essex and Lake Shore Interurban ====
The Windsor, Essex and Lake Shore Rapid Railway Company was incorporated in 1901 and was controlled by the Dominion Traction and Lighting Company. This Interurban line became active on September 19, 1907 and introduced a regional bus service by 1925 as "Highway Motor Coach Line". It would be acquired by local municipalities (City of Windsor, towns of Kingsville, Leamington and Essex and the townships of Sandwich West, Sandwich East, Sandwich South, Gosfield North and Gosfield South) as the Windsor, Essex and Lake Shore Electric Railway Association on September 8, 1929, coming under common ownership with the SW&A and its interurban lines. Under its new ownership, the line received substantial upgrades to its rails, as well as brand-new rolling stock. Its interurban cars and buses were branded as "The Sunshine County Route". Due to a severe drop in riders, service was suspended in 1932. Attempts to sell the line to a steam railroad were unsuccessful and all infrastructure was dismantled and sold in 1935. Interurban service was along city streets in Leamington and Windsor, and either on its own right of way or parallel to the public highway in the county.

==== Streetcar legacy ====
As of June 2025, short preserved sections of streetcar track from 1939 can be found at the intersection of Sandwich and Mill streets in a crosswalk on Sandwich Street. There are also the paved-over rails along Elm Avenue between Riverside Drive and University Avenue as two long, exceptionally straight grooves or cracks in the pavement. One of the original carhouses used by the Sandwich, Windsor and Amherstburg Railway still stands at 1220 University Avenue (formerly London Street).

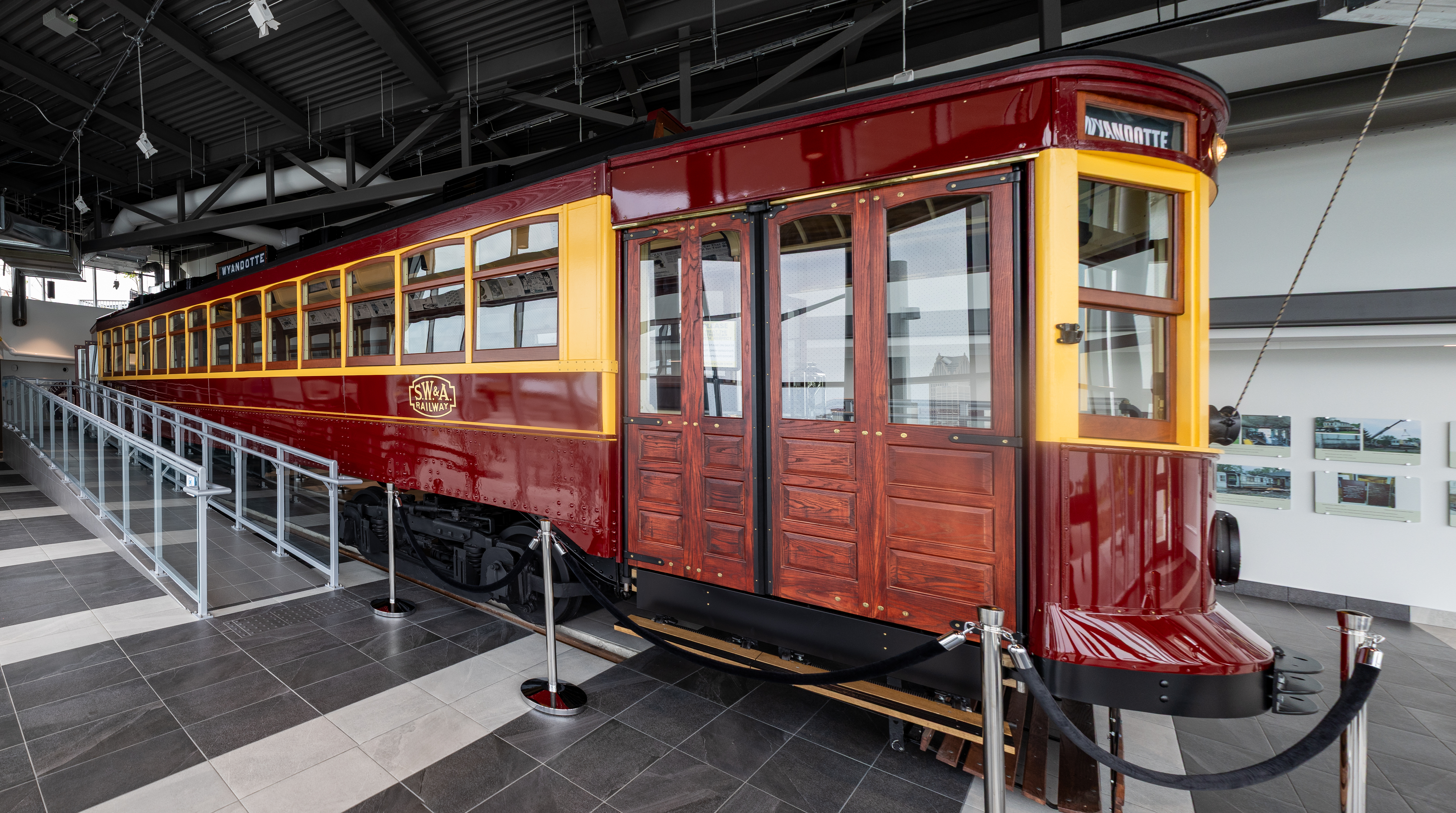
Restored streetcar No. 351

In 2015, a pair of restaurateurs found one of the original Windsor streetcars, No. 351, and had it hauled to the old carhouse on University Avenue for restoration and use as part of the restaurant they were planning to create in the carhouse building. Instead, streetcar No. 351 was donated to the City of Windsor and restored at RM Auto Restoration in Blenheim, Ontario. As of 2025, it is on static display at the Legacy Beacon pavilion on Windsor's riverfront, as part of the Central Riverfront Implementation Plan. The streetcar was built in Cincinnati in 1918 and was one of four cars (numbered 351-354) purchased second-hand from Public Service of New Jersey in 1927. It was used in suburban service on the Sandwich, Windsor and Amherstburg Railway. The streetcar is 50 feet (15 m) long, weighs 24,688 pounds (11,198 kg) and had a smoking section.

=== 1940s to 1960s ===
In the 1940s, SW&A was running Ford and Twin Coach branded buses. During the 1950s, it stopped the River Canard line (1951), the 6 mile Tecumseh route (1956), and the Amherstburg line (1958).

In the 1960s it ran 14 routes:

- 1. Crosstown
- 2. Dougall Avenue
- 3. Erie Street
- 4. Highway No.2
- 5. Lauzon Road
- 6. Malden Road
- 7. Howard Avenue
- 8. Ottawa
- 9. Pillette
- 10. St. Mary's Academy
- 11. Sanatorium
- 12. Sandwich East
- 13. Tecumseh-Drouillard
- 14. Wellington-Campbell

By 1973, these would be renumbered to the following:

- 1 Ouellette
- 2 Bruce
- 3 Riverdale
- 4 Campbell
- 5 Ottawa
- 6 Dominion
- 7 Crosstown
- 8 Dougall
- 9 Erie
- 10 Highway #2
- 11 Forest Glade
- 12 Howard
- 12A Devonshire (Came later than 1973)
- 13 Lincoln
- 14 Lauzon
- 15 Malden
- 16 Wellington

Lincoln-Trent Management Limited operated system for the City of Windsor from July 15, 1970 to November 1973.

=== 1977 to present ===
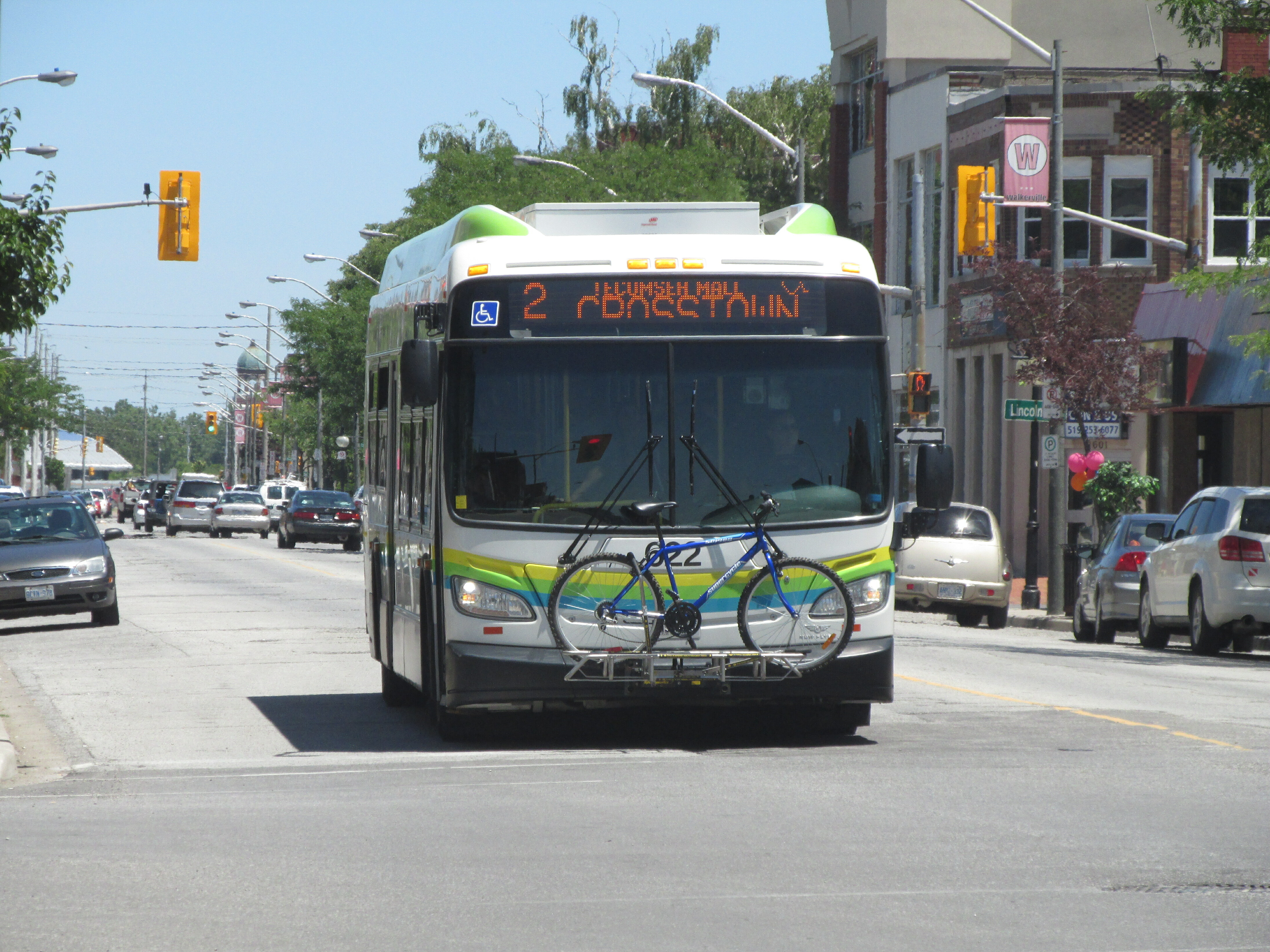
Transit Windsor New Flyer XDE40 hybrid bus in 2014

After changing its name to "Transit Windsor" in 1977, the company began operating GMC New Look buses and GM highway coaches.

In the 1980s, Transit Windsor bought 30 ft (9.14 m) and 40 ft (12.19 m) Orion 01.501 and 01.508 buses and 40 ft (12.19 m) GM New Looks. The company also purchased GM Classics, MCI Classics, and an Orion 05.501 demo.

In 1997 it purchased its first low-floor buses, the Nova Bus LFS. No new high-floor buses have been purchased since.

On Sunday, June 24, 2007, Transit Windsor and Greyhound began using the newly constructed Windsor International Transit Terminal (WITT). The new facility was built to replace the former bus station which was in disrepair. The routes that run through WITT include the Transway 1A, Transway 1C, Central 3 West, Ottawa 4, Dominion 5, Dougall 6, Walkerville 8, Parent 14 and the Tunnel Bus. The terminal is located at 300 Chatham Street West behind the Windsor International Aquatics and Training Centre.

In 2014, Transit Windsor placed 16 used vehicles into service that were second-hand units from London Transit. Those units were numbered 670-685 and were New Flyer D40i Invero model buses.

== Tunnel bus ==
The Detroit–Windsor Tunnel opened in November 1930 and was immediately served by a cross-border bus route operated by the Detroit and Canada Tunnel Company. The service was transferred to Transit Windsor on February 1, 1982. It operated on an hourly headway with a cash fare of $10 in U.S. or Canadian dollars in each direction. All passengers were required to clear customs facilities and re-board the bus. In 2019, the tunnel bus route served over 203,000 passengers after year of declining ridership due to stricter entry restrictions. The route had special service for sporting events in Detroit as well as concerts and civic holidays.

In February 2025, Mayor Drew Dilkens vetoed a plan that would have doubled the tunnel bus fare to save the cross-border service. The tunnel bus ceased operations on August 31, 2025. A change to Canadian labour law, along with the ongoing trade war with the U.S., increased costs to the operator, and so the service was cut.

== Ridership ==
Between 2007 and 2017, ridership steadily grew while Transit Windsor's service area stayed stagnant at around 210,000 to 220,000 people.

	2007	2008	2009	2010	2011	2012	2013	2014	2015	2016	2017	2018	2019	2020	2021	2022	2023
Yearly ridership	6.29m	6.86m	6.16m	6.10m	6.39m	6.41m	6.44m	6.37m	6.35m	6.51m	6.72m	8.18m	8.40m			5.26m	9.49m
