= Dominion House =

Coordinates: 42.30342°N 83.07504°W

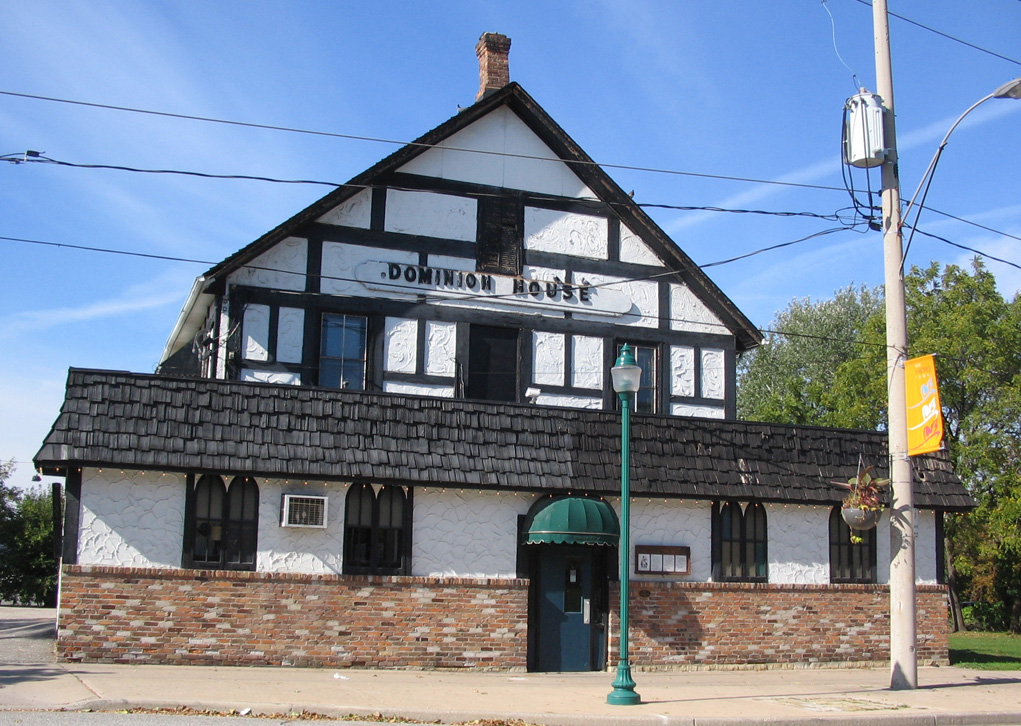
The Dominion House

The Dominion House Tavern, built before 1850, is the oldest remaining continuously run tavern in the Windsor-Detroit Border region and one of the oldest in Ontario.

From its commencement it has served and housed many residents and travelers while the stagecoach ran from Windsor to Amherstburg. It has been a licensed tavern since 1869, and a popular inn since the 1880s; frequented often by judges, juries and county government officials until the 1970s when the Sandwich courthouse closed.

The original "DH" inn (run by Albert Lininger), burnt down in 1879, and was originally located on the south side of Sandwich Street across from today's building which was quickly rebuilt within that year. Many farmers would stop on their trips from LaSalle and River Canard, while transporting their produce by horse and wagon to Detroit's Eastern Market.

The Dominion House has been owned by many people over its many years, including Mr. Daniel Marentette from the late 1880s until his death on July 28, 1902, then sold to Mr. Eugene Breault who was a long-time friend of the Marentette family. Capt. John McCarthy purchased it, and then Lorne White during the first prohibition years. William and Jean Boyer who owned it during the rest of prohibition years, witnessed the construction of the Ambassador Bridge and housed many bridge workers.

Sid Walman, who arrived from Toronto and wanting to get into the restaurant business, made the "DH' popular by serving the University crowd and locals, as well as opening up the basement for poetry readings and allowing professors to hold classes. After 48 years, Sid sold the Dominion House to long-time employee and bartender Amanda Heiser. Much effort has been put into keeping much of the place's historic past intact. The Dominion House is currently owned by Kristian Neill and Chris Mickle.

Today, it still holds to its old fashioned English pub style. Covering its walls are antique knickknacks and traditional pub pictures. In the basement, remnants of rum running tunnels from prohibition years can be found. It is still frequented and enjoyed by University students, professors and locals. The Dominion House is number 8666 in the Canadian Register of Historic Places.

== Bibliography ==
- Sullivan, Hal., "Business of the Century", In Business Magazine, Jan 1992, Windsor, p. 15
- Hewetson, Alan., "The Dominion House", Rose City Magazine, Oct. 22, 1997, p. 9
- Marentette Bill, "Dominion House", Best of Times Memories of Walkerville, Walkerville publishing, Canada, 2004, p. 249-250
- Marentette, Bill., The Best of Times Magazine, issue #13, Windsor, Feb 2001, p. 251-252
- Morgan, Carl., Historic Border Region, Benchmark Publishing, Windsor, 1994, p. 25
- Perrie, Bill., Ontario's Best Pubs, Toronto, WMI Books, p. 173
- Windsor Architectural Conservation Committee, Historic Sandwich town, Designated in 1993 under the Ont. Heritage Act, 1986
- Windsor Architectural Conservation Committee, Historic Sandwich town, Designated in 1993 under the Ont. Heritage Act, 1990
