= Windsor Community Museum =

Coordinates: 42.3185°N 83.0424°W

Museum Windsor
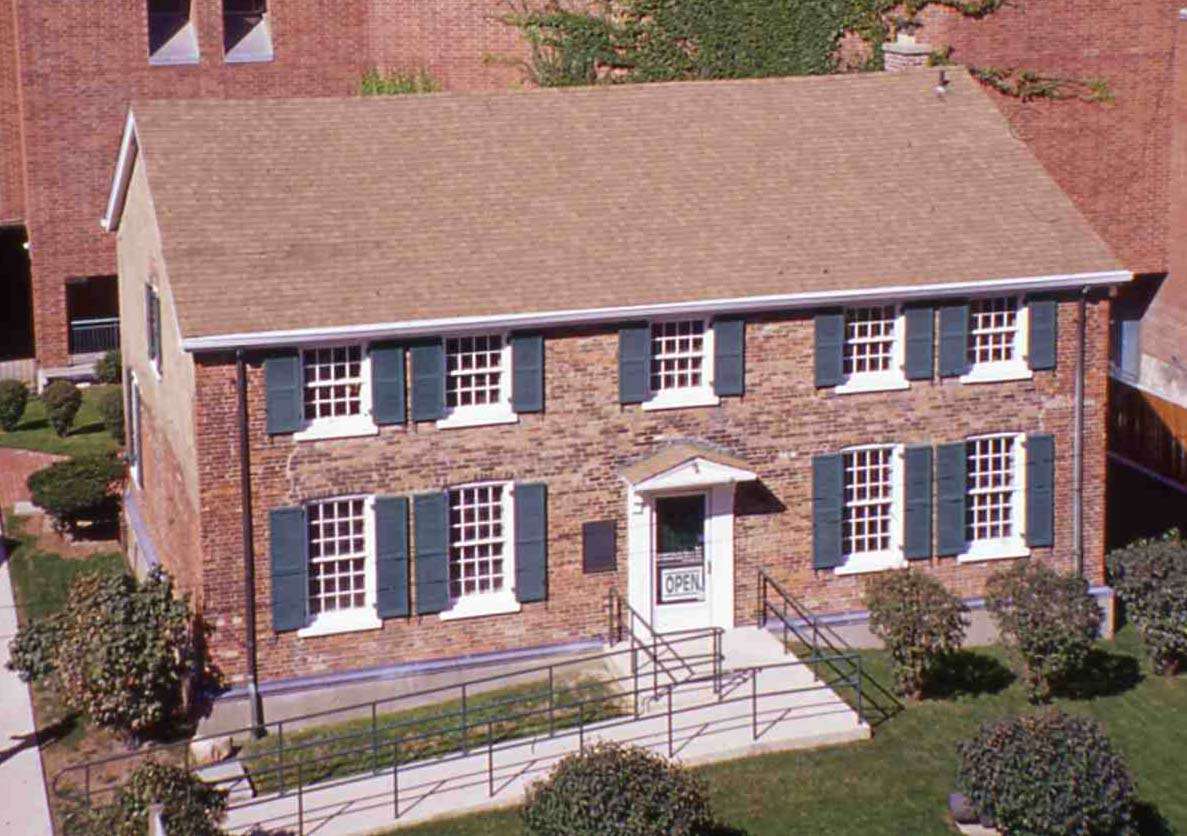
- Established: 1958
- Location: Windsor, Ontario, Canada
- Type: historic museum

Windsor Community Museum is a historical museum located in Windsor, Ontario, Canada which displays artifacts from Windsor. It is located at François Baby House, built in 1812 by François Baby, a prominent French-Canadian (which is now designated as a National Historic Site).

The museum was founded as the Hiram Walker Historical Museum because Hiram Walker and Sons Limited donated a lot of money for the restoration of the Baby House. In 1991 the museum's name was changed to the "François Baby House: Windsor's Community Museum" in an attempt alleviate confusion between the museum and the Hiram Walker Company. Also, the name did not accurately reflect the museum's aim or purpose. In 1996 the museum was given the name Windsor's Community Museum. The name became Museum Windsor in 2016 with the opening of the second location, the Chimczuk Museum (401 Riverside Dr W).

The building now houses over 15,000 artifacts and documents which hold particular importance to the history of Windsor and the greater Essex County, Ontario region. The museum was founded in 1958 by local amateur historian and merchant, George Fortune Macdonald (1877-1959) and is now administered by the City of Windsor. Under the umbrella of Museum Windsor, they also offer occasional tours of the Duff Baby House, and run the historic tours of Streetcar No. 351 at the Legacy Beacon.

== Battle of Windsor ==
In 1966, the Archaeological and Historic Sites Board of Ontario erected a Provincial Military plaque on the grounds of the Hiram Walker Historical Museum: "The Battle of Windsor 1838 - Early on December 4, 1838, a force of about 140 American and Canadian supporters of William Lyon Mackenzie crossed the river from Detroit and landed about one mile east of here. After capturing and burning a nearby militia barracks, they took possession of Windsor. In this vicinity they were met and routed by a force of some 130 militiamen commanded by Colonel John Prince. Four of the invaders taken prisoner were executed summarily by order of Colonel Prince. This action caused violent controversy in Canada and the United States. The remaining captives were tried and sentenced at London, Upper Canada. Six were executed, eighteen transported to a penal colony in Tasmania and sixteen deported."

== Affiliations ==
The museum is affiliated with: Canadian Museums Association, Canadian Heritage Information Network, and Virtual Museum of Canada.
