= Babe Parnell =

American football player (1901–1982)

No. 12, 41, 29, 8
- Position: Tackle / Guard

Personal information
- Born: January 9, 1901; Ashtabula, Ohio, U.S.
- Died: May 29, 1982 (aged 81); Kingsville, Ohio, U.S.
- Listed height: 6 ft 3 in (1.91 m)
- Listed weight: 205 lb (93 kg)

Career information
- High school: Ashtabula (Ohio)
- College: Colgate (1921); Allegheny (1922–1924)

Career history
- New York Giants (1925–1928)

Awards and highlights
- NFL champion (1927)
- Stats at Pro Football Reference

Frederick Anthony "Babe" Parnell (January 9, 1901 – May 29, 1982) was an American professional football player who played four seasons with the New York Giants of the National Football League (NFL). He played college football at Colgate University and Allegheny College.

== Early life and college ==
Frederick Anthony Parnell was born on January 9, 1901, in Ashtabula, Ohio. He attended Ashtabula High School in Ashtabula.

He played college football at Colgate University in 1921 and was a letterman that season. He was then a three-year letterman at Allegheny College from 1922 to 1924.

== Professional career ==
Parnell signed with the New York Giants of the National Football League in 1925. He played in all 12 games, starting 11, for the Giants during the team's inaugural season in 1925. The Giants finished the year with an 8–4 record, good for fourth place in the NFL. Parnell appeared in four games, starting three, the next year in 1926. He then played in two games in 1927. The 1927 Giants were named NFL champions after finishing the season in first place with an 11–1–1 record. Parnell appeared in one game during his final year with the Giants in 1928. He was released in 1928.

== Personal life ==
Parnell died on May 29, 1982, in Kingsville, Ohio.
