= Duff Baby House =

Coordinates: 42.3023°N 83.0769°W

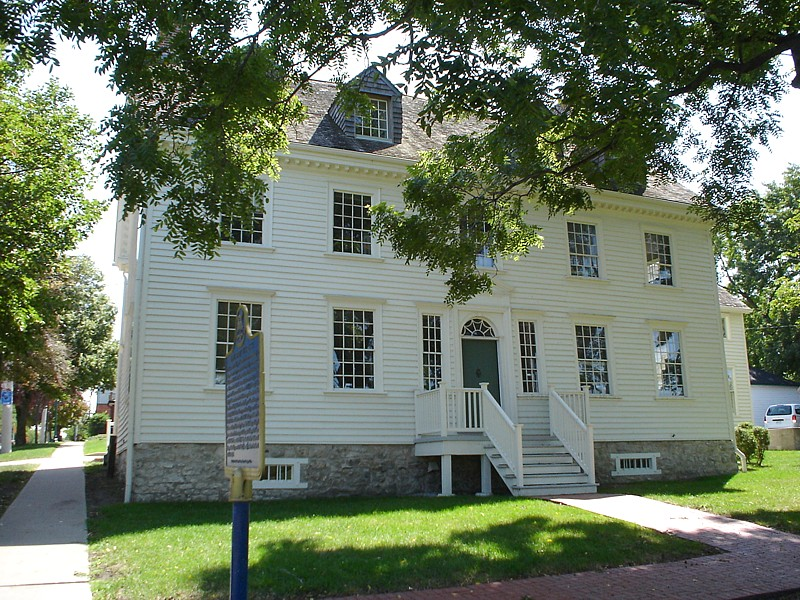
- Established: 1798
- Location: 221 Mill Street; Windsor, Ontario, Canada
- Type: Historic house museum Ontario Heritage Trust
- Website: OHT page

The Duff Baby House is an historic house located in Windsor, Ontario, Canada. Open to public select Saturday throughout the year.

== History ==
The house was built between 1792 and 1798 by Alexander Duff as a fur trade post. In 1807 the building was bought by James Baby and it is alleged to have been used during the War of 1812 as the headquarters of U.S. General Harrison, and by the British Colonel Henry Proctor and General Isaac Brock.

The two-and-a-half-story timber structure was refinished as Baby's residence in 1816. It is located at 221 Mill Street in Old Sandwich Town, which is the oldest part of Windsor, where settlements date back to the mid-18th century. The Duff Baby House is also one of the best-preserved and oldest Georgian-style houses in Ontario. Today the building is owned by the Ontario Heritage Trust and houses government offices.

Windsor's Community Museum operates a local history interpretive centre behind the Duff Baby House.

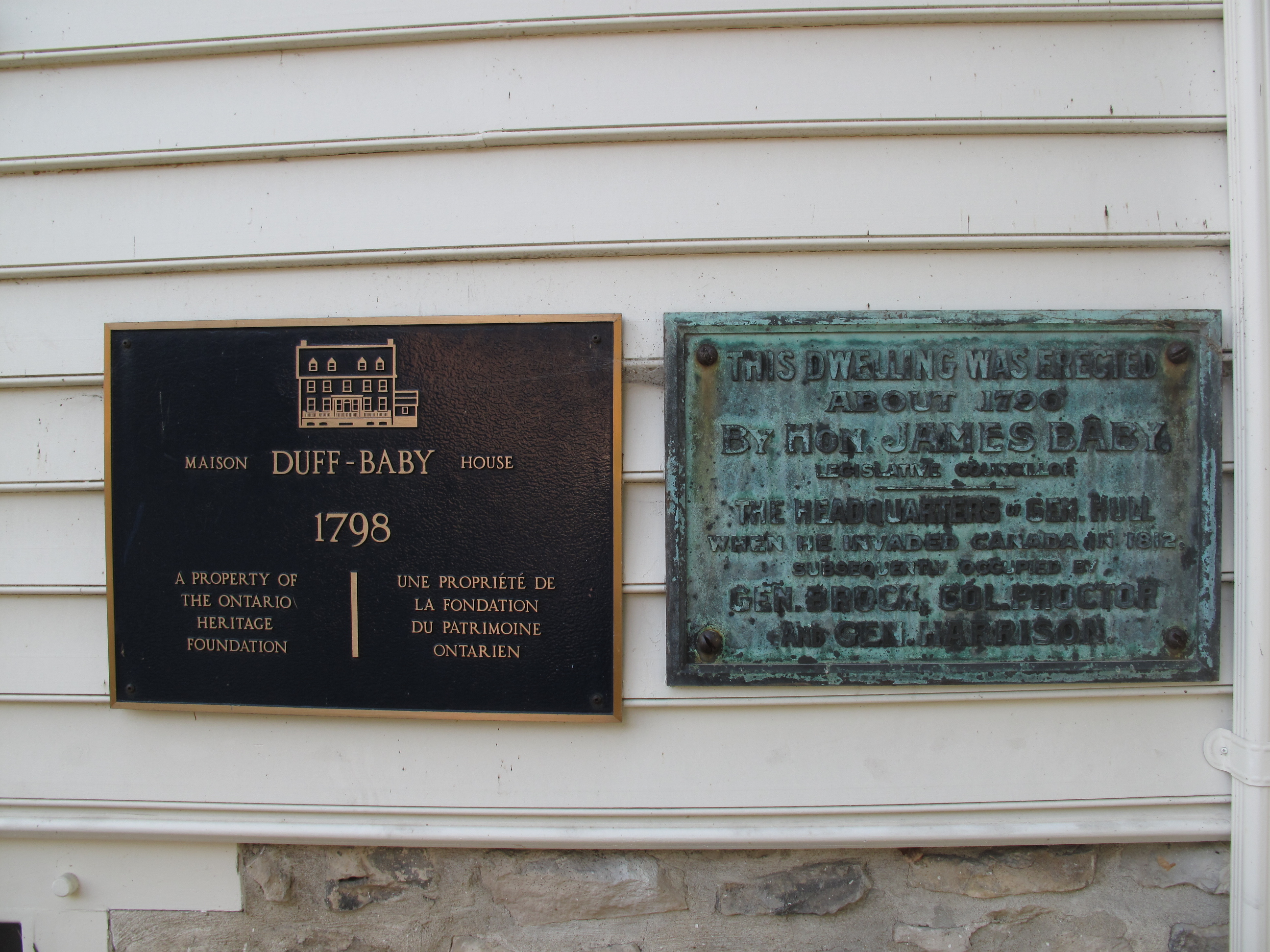
Duff-Baby House historical plaques. The right plaque reads "This dwelling was erected about 1790 by Hon. James Baby, legislative councillor. The headquarters of Gen. Hull when he invaded Canada in 1812, subsequently occupied by Gen. Brock, Col. Proctor and Gen. Harrison."
