= François Baby (legislative councillor) =

Legislator and businessman from Upper Canada

Charles François Xavier Baby (19 June 1794 – 6 August 1864), was the eldest son of François Baby and received his formal education at Séminaire de Québec before entering into business.

Charles had a varied career in business, encountering financial difficulties on at least three occasions, one of which ended in bankruptcy. He had purchased and lost various land holdings and also participated in the timber trade.

By 1851, he appears to have had the worst of his financial difficulties behind him. He was involved in building and maintaining lighthouses for the government. He became an investor in the north shore railway and specifically the towing service and tugs. His various contracts were bought out in 1860 for an amount equal to three major debts.

Baby entered politics in 1861, being elected as a member of the Legislative Council of the Province of Canada, and serving until his death. The years of government contracts and behind the scenes deals had made him a man of great influence in Quebec.

In August 1831, he had married Clothilde Pinsoneault, sister of Pierre-Adolphe Pinsoneault. He was the first Catholic bishop of London, Ontario.
