= Ahmad Suradji =

Indonesian serial killer

- Born: 10 January 1949; Pasar Rongkat, North Sumatra, Indonesia
- Died: 10 July 2008 (aged 59); Deli Serdang, North Sumatra, Indonesia
- Cause of death: Execution by firing squad
- Other names: Dukun AS; Nasib Kelewang; Datuk Maringgi; The Sorcerer; The Black Magic Killer
- Spouse(s): 3 (Tumini, Tuminah and Ngatiyah)
- Conviction: Murder (42 counts)
- Penalty: Death

Details
- Victims: 42
- Span of crimes: 1986–1997
- Country: Indonesia
- Date apprehended: 30 April 1997

Ahmad Suradji (10 January 1949 – 10 July 2008), also known as Dukun AS, Nasib Klewang, and Datuk Maringgi, was an Indonesian serial killer who admitted to murdering 42 girls and women between 1986 and 1997. Suradji's victims, ranging in age between 11 and 30, were strangled after being buried in the ground up to their waists as part of a ritual. He buried his victims in a sugarcane plantation near his home with their heads facing his house, which he believed would give him extra power.

== Background ==
Ahmad Suradji lived in Medan, the capital and largest city of Indonesia's North Sumatra province. He worked as a cattle breeder and as a dukun, a class of shaman reputed to possess supernatural powers. Suradji's clientele were often women seeking his guidance on how to find good fortune or maintain their beauty. According to Suradji, his deceased father visited him in a dream in 1986 and commanded him to drink the saliva of 72 women as part of a black magic ritual.

== Murders ==
On 24 April 1997, 21-year-old Sri Kemala Dewi asked a 15-year-old rickshaw puller named Andreas to take her to "Datuk". She informed him to keep it a secret and never requested to be picked up. Three days later, Dewi's naked and decomposing body was found in a sugarcane field by a man and was later dug up by a group of people who then called the police. Andreas reported to the police and Dewi's family that he had dropped her off at Suradji's house three days earlier, and so police visited Suradji to question him about it. Although he at first denied having anything to do with Dewi's death, police found her handbag, dress and bracelet in his home. He was later arrested on April 30, 1997. During interrogation, Suradji eventually confessed to Dewi's murder but also revealed that he had killed up to 42 girls in the same fashion and an excavation had to be carried out in the sugarcane field where Dewi's body had been found. Throughout the process, 42 bodies were exhumed with some being decomposed to the point where they were unidentifiable.

He told police that he had a dream in 1986 in which his father's ghost directed him to drink the saliva of 72 dead young women so that he could become a mystic healer. Suradji thought that it would take him too long to encounter 72 women who had died of natural causes, so he decided to speed up the process by killing. As a sorcerer, or dukun, a steady stream of women already visited him for various services such as spiritual advice, items that could improve their beauty or wealth, or for Suradji to cast a spell on their spouses to keep them from having an affair. He would then take them into the nearby sugarcane field and bury them up to their waist, claiming it was part of the ritual. He would then proceed to strangle his victims until they were dead and then drink their saliva. Afterwards, he'd strip the clothes from their bodies to accelerate decomposition and bury them completely with their heads pointing toward his house. Suradji stated the following to the police:

My father did not specifically advise me to kill people. So I was thinking, it would take ages if I have to wait to get seventy women. I was trying to get to it as fast as possible, I took my own initiative to kill.

== Trial ==
The trial began on 11 December 1997, with a 363-page charge against him; Suradji maintained his innocence. His three wives—all sisters—were also arrested for assisting in the murders and helping to hide the bodies. One of his wives, Tumini, was tried as his accomplice. They claimed they confessed under torture by the police. He was found guilty on 27 April 1998 by a three-judge panel in the Lubuk Pakam District Court, and was sentenced to death by firing squad. There were cheers from a large crowd in the courtroom as the verdict was read out. More than 100 people had packed into the small courtroom while as many followed the proceedings outside on a television screen. Suradji's wife, Tumini, was also sentenced to death for assisting with the murders, but her sentence was later reduced to life in prison.

== Death ==
He was sentenced to death by firing squad and executed on 10 July 2008, after a death warrant was issued the week prior.

== See also ==
- List of serial killers by country
- List of serial killers by number of victims
