= François Baby House =

Coordinates: 42.3185°N 83.0424°W

François Bâby House
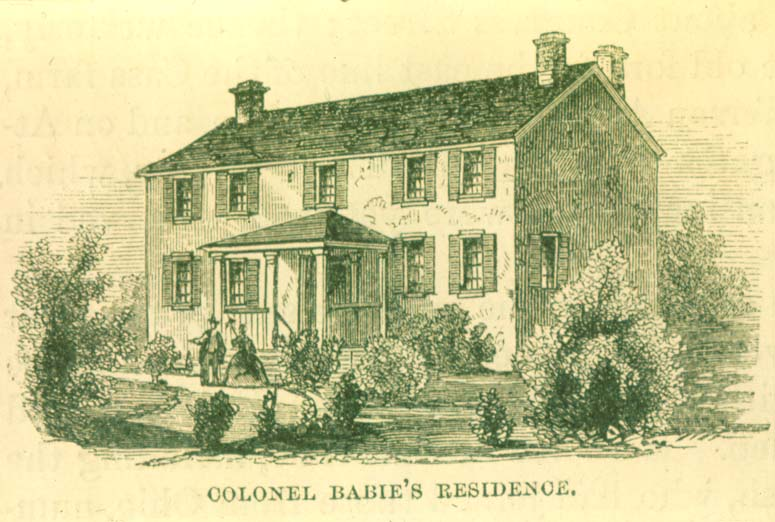
- François Bâby House from the 1869 publication The Pictorial Field-Book of the War of 1812 by B. Lossing
- Interactive map of François Bâby House
- Location: Windsor, Ontario, Canada

Site notes
- Governing body: Windsor's Community Museum
- Website: Windsor's Community Museum

National Historic Site of Canada
- Designated: 1950

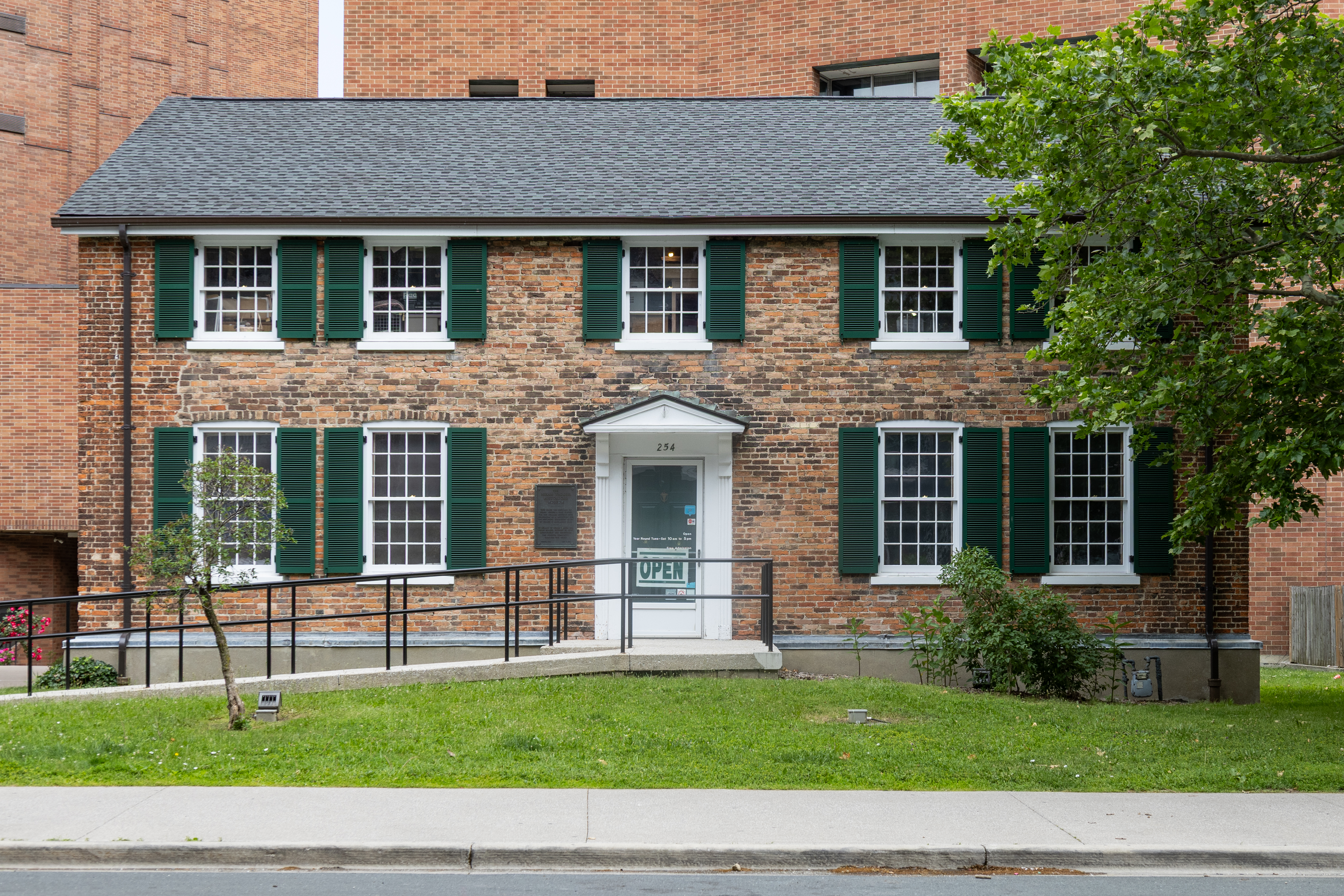
François Baby House

The François Bâby House is a historic residence located in Windsor, Ontario, Canada which was owned by the prominent local politician François Baby. The house is a two-storey, Georgian style, red brick house once known as La Ferme locally, and was a French-Canadian ribbon farm which was a long narrow tract fronting endwise on the Detroit River. The home itself has historical ties to the War of 1812 where it was used as a headquarters by both the American and British forces.

Today, the François Baby House has been designated as a National Historic Site of Canada and serves as the current home of Windsor's Community Museum, a historical museum which displays the city's rich and colourful past.

== Timeline ==
- 1751 - November 24. Land including site of the house granted by Pierre Celoron, Sieur de Bienville, commandant at French Detroit, to Pierre Réaume.
- 1800 - December 19. Suzanne Réaume Baby sold the farm to her son François for ten shillings plus one grain of pepper.
- 1812 - Spring and summer. Construction of the house. Original front faced the Detroit River
- 1812 - July 12. War of 1812 opened with invasion of Upper Canada across the Detroit River. Baby house commandeered, unfinished, by American Brigadier General William Hull
- 1812 - July 13. Defensive works established around the three inland sides. American camp was located in Baby's orchard.
- 1812 - August 7. Hull's position had worsened, and he withdrew his troops to the safety of Fort Lernoult, directly across the river from the house.
- 1812 - August 15. Arrival of main British force on upper Detroit River, led by Major General Isaac Brock. Bombardment of Detroit began. Americans returned fire.
- 1812 - August 16. Bombardment continued, and Detroit surrendered to invading British, Canadians, and Indians.
- 1838 - December 4. Battle of Windsor, fought in the Baby orchard, ended the Patriot War, which had resulted from political disturbances in Upper Canada. Invading "Patriots" were largely American.
- 1850 - October 8. Fire heavily damaged Baby House.
- 1890 - The House had been converted to a double dwelling. Original north porch replaced by a full-width lean-to. Pitt Street side became the front. Bay windows connecting porch, gables added to new front.
- c. 1931 - House abandoned during the Great Depression.
- 1948 - Partial renovation. Additions removed, Pitt Street wall replaced.
- 1958 - Final renovation. François Baby House opened May 7 as the Hiram Walker Historical Museum.
- 1968 - Addition of underground storage and outdoor display facility
