= Very Idham Henyansyah =

Indonesian serial killer

- Born: February 1, 1978 (age 48); Jombang, Indonesia
- Other names: Ryan; Singing serial killer The butcher of Jombang
- Conviction: Murder
- Penalty: Death

Details
- Victims: 11
- Span of crimes: 2006–2008
- Country: Indonesia
- Date apprehended: 15 July 2008

Very Idham Henyansyah, also known as Ryan, is an Indonesian convicted serial killer. Henyansyah confessed to killing 11 people and was sentenced to death by the Indonesian criminal court after being arrested in 2008. He is awaiting execution at Kesambi Penitentiary in Cirebon.

Henyansyah's case achieved notoriety throughout Indonesia due to the gruesome nature of the murders. Known for his uncontrollable temper, Ryan killed a mother and her child by bashing their heads with a metal bar after they had angered him. The body of one victim was found on a roadside in Jakarta, dismembered into seven pieces and skewered with a crowbar. Henyansyah buried his other victims' bodies in the backyard of his home in Jombang Regency, East Java.

After his arrest, Henyansyah became known as the "singing serial killer", as he entertained court officers, fellow inmates, and the media from his jail cell by singing a song from his upcoming album.

In February 2009, Henyansyah released an autobiography titled The Untold Story of Ryan. In the book, Henyansyah detailed he was once a Qur'an recitation teacher and later a male model.

Henyansyah is openly homosexual and has confessed that all but three of his victims were also homosexual men. He admitted to killing a victim who had offered him money and a car to have sex with his boyfriend. In October 2010, Henyansyah announced that he was planning to marry a convicted female drug dealer, Eny Wijaya, whom he had met in 2008 when they were both detained at the Jakarta Police Narcotics Detention Center. Wijaya was later released from Pondok Bambu in around September 2010. One of his stated reasons for marrying Wijaya despite his homosexuality is to grant his mother's wish that he be wed to a woman.

== See also ==
- List of serial killers by country
- List of serial killers by number of victims
