= Jacques Baby =

Colonial Canadian fur trader

Jacques Bâby
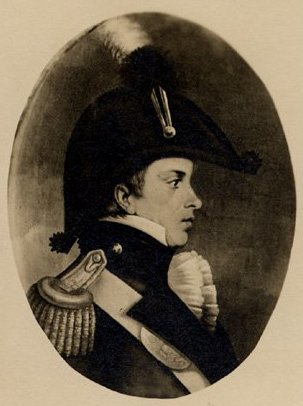
- Born: 1731; Montreal, New France
- Died: 1789 (aged 57–58); Detroit, Upper Canada, British North America
- Spouse(s): Susanne Réaume (Rhéaume), dit La Croix
- Children: François; James (Jacques); Jean Baptiste

Jacques Bâby, dit Dupéron (1731 – August 1789) was a French-Canadian fur trader who later became an employee of the British Indian Department. He worked in the Detroit area, where he acquired large amounts of land on both sides of the Detroit River, in what became the United States and Canada. His four sons were later each active in Canadian politics, serving in appointed and elected offices.

== Early life ==
He was born in Montreal in 1731. He worked as a fur trader and Indian agent at Logstown, near the current location of Ambridge, Pennsylvania.

After the fall of New France to the British in 1760, as part of the Seven Years' War, Bâby initially refused to swear allegiance to King George III. He considered leaving the country.

But after he learned that his brother François was transferring his operations from France to London, Bâby swore the oath of allegiance and resumed trading. He moved to the Fort Shelby (Detroit) area in present-day Michigan.

In 1777, during the American Revolutionary War, Bâby was appointed by the British as a captain and interpreter in the Indian Department. Bâby acquired large amounts of land on both the American and British sides of the Detroit River, as well as to the north along the St. Clair River. In 1787, after the United States gained independence, Bâby was appointed by the Americans as lieutenant-colonel of the Detroit militia. In 1788, he was named to the land board of the Hesse District in western Ontario. He died at Fort Shelby in 1789.

His son James Bâby later became a judge and a member of the Executive Council and Legislative Council of Upper Canada. His sons François, James (Jacques) and Jean Baptiste were elected as members of the Legislative Assembly in Upper Canada (now Ontario). His daughter Suzanne married William Caldwell, a Loyalist soldier of the American Revolutionary War, an Indian agent, and founder of Amherstburg, Ontario.

== Legacy ==
- Bâby Point in St. Clair, Ontario is named for him, consisting of some of his former property along the St. Clair River.
