= James Baby =

Canadian judge (1763–1833)

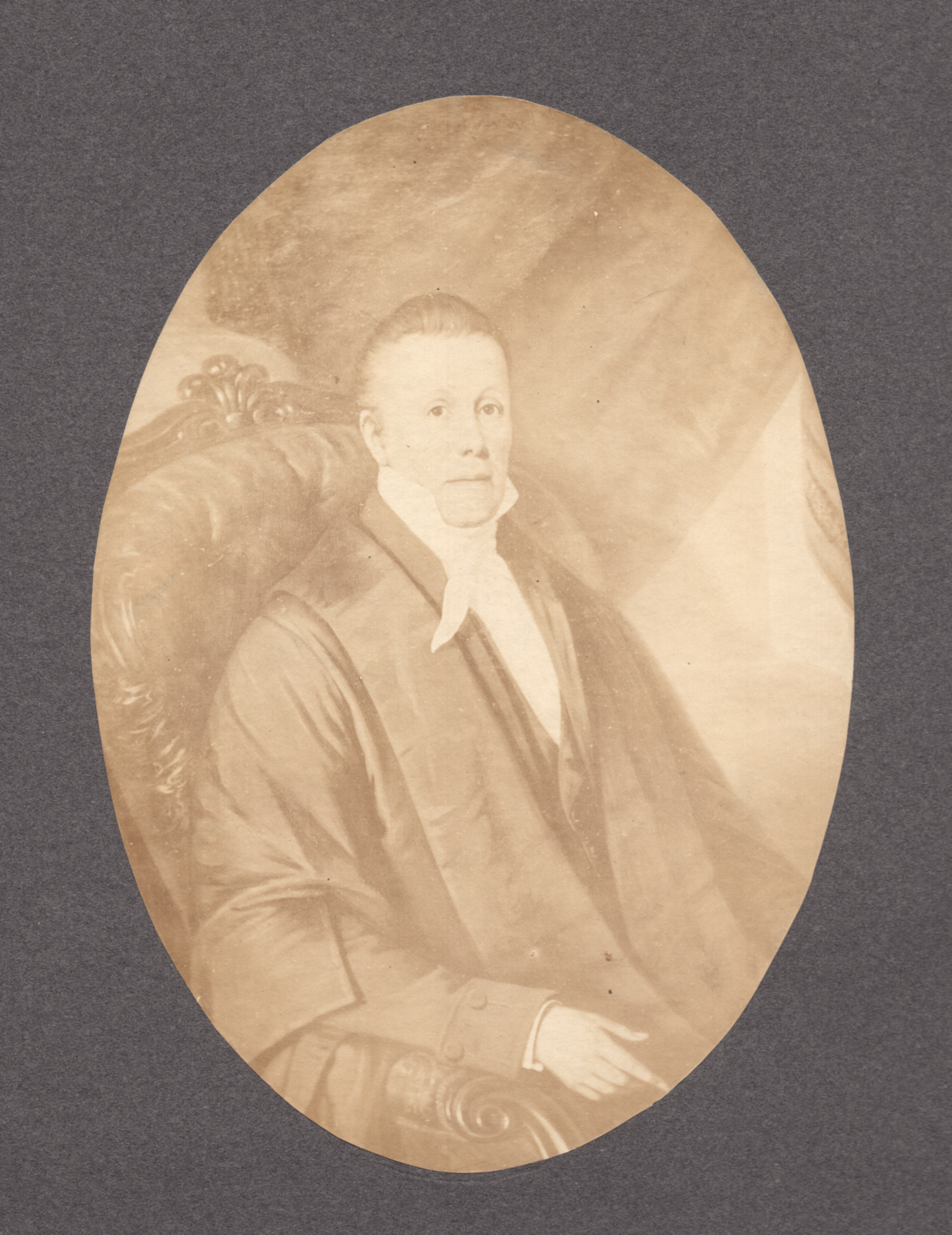

James Duperon Bâby (August 25, 1763 – February 19, 1833) was a judge and political figure in Upper Canada.

== Biography ==
He was born Jacques Bâby, the son of Jacques Bâby dit Duperon, to a prosperous family in Detroit in 1763. His last name is pronounced "Baw-bee" and has been anglicized in different lines (e.g., Baubie, Bauby). He was educated in Quebec, where his uncle, François Bâby, lived. In 1792, he was appointed to the Executive Council and Legislative Council of Upper Canada and became lieutenant for Kent County. In 1793, he was appointed judge in the Western District.

After the Jay Treaty in 1795, the Bâby family left the Detroit area and moved to Sandwich (now Windsor). (Today, his house is owned by the Ontario Heritage Trust and is used for government offices.) Over the years, the family acquired large amounts of land in the western region of Upper Canada. Bâby was put in charge of the 1st Kent militia. During the War of 1812, Sandwich was seized by the Americans, and Bâby was later taken prisoner at the Battle of the Thames. During the American occupation, his property suffered extensive damage.

In 1815, he was appointed Inspector General and moved to York (now Toronto), where he was a politician, judge, wealthy landowner, and part of the ruling clique known as the Family Compact. In 1816, he purchased land on the east bank of the Humber, formerly the site of the Seneca Teiaiagon village, land where a neighbourhood known as Baby Point is located.

In 1823, he represented Upper Canada in resolving a dispute with Lower Canada over the sharing of customs revenues. A Roman Catholic, he helped establish the first Catholic church at York, St. Paul's.

The Baby family had enslaved at least 17 black and indigenous people in the 18th and early 19th century in Canada. James Baby opposed Lieutenant Governor John Graves Simcoe's effort to precipitately abolish slavery outright in Upper Canada. The resulting compromise legislation the Act Against Slavery passed in 1793 prohibited the buying or trading in enslaved people. The Act however allowed existing slave owners to continue enslaving people until slavery's outright abolition in 1834 in the British Empire by the passage of the Slavery Abolition Act.

== Personal ==
He died in York in 1833.
