= François Baby (businessman) =

Canadian politician (1733–1820)

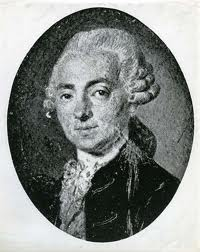

François Baby (4 October 1733 – 6 October 1820) was a fur trader and political figure in what was called New France, early Quebec, and Lower Canada. Born in Montreal, he was part of an ethnic French family that had been fur trading in New France since the late 17th century.

== Biography ==
Baby was born in 1733 in Montreal to a family of fur traders. His father, and grandfather Jacques Babie, had been successful in the business. His eldest brother Jacques and other family members were active in the same business.

After completing formal education at the Jesuit college at Quebec, he joined his brothers Jacques and Antoine in a fur trading business they called Baby Frères. His two brothers conducted the field operations, while François ran the Montreal operation, importing trade goods and exporting furs and dealing with their contacts in France.

Baby was appointed to the Legislative Council for the Province of Quebec in 1778 by Governor Haldimand. He appointed Baby as part of his unconstitutional privy council around that time. (This appointment placed Baby on the Legislative Council of Lower Canada when it was formed in 1792.) Joining the governing class meant that Baby had less time to spend on commercial activities.

In 1786, he had married Marie-Anne Tarieu, the daughter of seigneur Charles-François Tarieu de La Naudière.

He suffered from ill health later in life and became less active in politics. Baby died at Quebec City in 1820.

His son Charles-François-Xavier later served as a member of the Legislative Council of the Province of Canada. His daughter Monique-Ursule married Thomas Ainslie Young, a member of the legislative assembly.
